= List of American grunge bands =

This is a list of American grunge bands. It includes rock bands and solo artists formed in the United States whose primary genre is grunge or either they have or had the elements of it in their music style. Grunge music is a subgenre of alternative rock that emerged during the mid-1980s in the American state of Washington, particularly in the Seattle area. Inspired by hardcore punk, heavy metal, and indie rock, grunge is generally characterized by heavily distorted electric guitars, contrasting song dynamics, and apathetic or angst-filled lyrics. The grunge aesthetic is stripped-down compared to other forms of rock music, and many grunge musicians were noted for their unkempt appearances and rejection of theatrics.

== # ==
Band	Years active	Origin	Studio albums
7 Year Bitch	1990–1997	Seattle, Washington	Sick 'Em (1992); ¡Viva Zapata! (1994); Gato Negro (1996)

== A ==
Band	Years active	Origin	Studio albums
The Afghan Whigs	1986–Present	Cincinnati, Ohio	Big Top Halloween (1988); Up in It (1990); Congregation (1992); Gentlemen (1993); Black Love (1996); 1965 (1998); Do to the Beast (2014); In Spades (2017); How Do You Burn? (2022)
Alice in Chains	1987–2002 / 2005–Present	Seattle, Washington	Facelift (1990); Dirt (1992); Alice in Chains (1995); Black Gives Way to Blue (2009); The Devil Put Dinosaurs Here (2013); Rainier Fog (2018)
Alice Donut	1986–1996 / 2001 – Present	New York City, New York	Donut Comes Alive (1988); Bucketfulls of Sickness and Horror in an Otherwise Meaningless Life (1989); Mule (1990); Revenge fantasies of the impotent (1990); The Untidy Suicides of your Degenerate Children (1992); Pure Acid Park (1995); Three Sisters (2004); Fuzz (2006); Ten Glorious Animals (2009)
Alcohol Funnycar	1991–1996	Seattle, Washington	Burn (1993); Time To Make The Donuts (1993); Weasels (1995)

== B ==
Band	Years active	Origin	Studio albums
Babes in Toyland	1987–2001	Minneapolis, Minnesota	Spanking Machine (1990); Fontanelle (1992); Nemesisters (1995)
Big Chief	1989–1996	Ann Arbor, Michigan	Face (1991); Mack Avenue Skullgame (1993); Platinum Jive (1994)
Blind Melon	1990–1999 / 2006–2008 / 2010–Present	Los Angeles, California	Blind Melon (1992); Soup (1995); For My Friends (2008)
Blood Circus	1986–1989 / 1992 / 2007	Seattle, Washington	
Bullet LaVolta	1987-1992	Boston, Massachusetts	The Gift (1989); Swandive (1992)
Bundle of Hiss	1980–1988	Seattle, Washington	Sessions: 1986-1988 (2000)

== C ==
Band	Years active	Origin	Studio albums
Cat Butt	1987–1990	Seattle, Washington	Journey to the Center Of (1989)
Coffin Break	1987–1994	Seattle, Washington	Psychosis (1989); Rupture (1990); Crawl (1991); Thirteen (1992)

== D ==
Band	Years active	Origin	Studio albums
Daddy Hate Box	1989–1990	Seattle, Washington	Sugar Plow (1990)
Dandelion	1989–1996	Philadelphia, Pennsylvania	I Think I'm Gonna Be Sick (1993); Dyslexicon (1995)
Das Damen	1984–1991	New York, New York	Das Damen (1986); Jupiter Eye (1986); Triskaidekaphobe (1988); Mouse Trap (1989)
Dickless	1989–1998	Seattle, Washington	
Drop Acid	1991–1993	Sacramento, California	Making God Smile (1991); 36th & Teeth E.P. (1992)

== F ==
Band	Years active	Origin	Studio albums
Failure	1990–1997, 2014–present	Los Angeles, California	Comfort (1992); Magnified (1994); Fantastic Planet (1996); The Heart Is A Monster (2015); In The Future Your Body Will Be The Furthest Thing From Your Mind (2018); Wild Type Droid (2021)
Fecal Matter	1985–1986	Aberdeen, Washington	Illiteracy Will Prevail (1986)
Flowerhead	1987–1995	Austin, Texas	...Ka-Bloom! (1992); The People's Fuzz (1995)
The Fluid	1984–1993 / 2008	Denver, Colorado	Punch n Judy (1986); Clear Black Paper (1988); Roadmouth (1989); Purplemetalflakemusic (1993)

== G ==
Band	Years active	Origin	Studio albums
Gas Huffer	1989–2006	Seattle, Washington	Janitors of Tomorrow (1991); Integrity, Technology & Service (1992); One Inch Masters (1994); The Inhuman Ordeal of Special Agent Gas Huffer (1996); Just Beautiful Music (1998); The Rest of Us (2002); Lemonade for Vampires (2005)
The Gits	1986–1993	Yellow Springs, Ohio	Frenching The Bully (1992); Enter: The Conquering Chicken (1994)
Green River	1984–1988 / 2008–2009	Seattle, Washington	Rehab Doll (1988)
Gruntruck	1989–1993 / 1996–2002	Seattle, Washington	Inside Yours (1990); Push (1992); Gruntruck (2017)
Gumball	1990–1994	New York City, New York	Special Kiss (1991); Super Tasty (1993); Revolution on Ice (1994)

== H ==
Band	Years active	Origin	Studio albums
Hammerbox	1990–1994	Seattle, Washington	Hammerbox (1991); Numb (1993)
Hater	1993–1997 / 2005	Seattle, Washington	Hater (1993); The 2nd (2005)
Hazel	1992–1997	Portland, Oregon	Toreador of Love (1993); Are You Going to Eat That (1995)
Hole	1989–2002 / 2010–2012	Los Angeles, California	Pretty on the Inside (1991); Live Through This (1994); Celebrity Skin (1998); Nobody's Daughter (2010)
Hullabaloo	1986–1993 / 2013–present	Cambridge, Massachusetts	Beat Until Stiff (1989); Dead Serious (1990); Lubritorium (1991)

== J ==
Band	Years active	Origin	Studio albums
Jerry Cantrell		Seattle, Washington	Boggy Depot (1998); Degradation Trip (2002); Degradation Trip Volumes 1 & 2 (2002)

== L ==
Band	Years active	Origin	Studio albums
L7	1985–2001, 2014–present	Los Angeles, California	L7 (1988); Smell the Magic (1990); Bricks Are Heavy (1992); Hungry for Stink (1994); The Beauty Process: Triple Platinum (1997); Slap-Happy (1999); Scatter the Rats (2019)
Local H	1990–Present	Zion, Illinois	Ham Fisted (1995); As Good As Dead (1996); Pack Up The Cats (1998); Here Comes The Zoo (2002); Whatever Happened To P.J. Soles? (2004); Twelve Angry Months (2008); Hallelujah! I'm A Bum (2012); Hey, Killer (2015); LIFERS (2020)
Love Battery	1989–2002, 2006, 2011–2012	Seattle, Washington	Dayglo (1992); Far Gone (1993); Straight Freak Ticket (1995); Confusion Au Go Go (1999)

== M ==
Band	Years active	Origin	Studio albums
Mad Season	1994–1999	Seattle, Washington	Above (1995)
Malfunkshun	1980–88, 2006–present	Bainbridge Island, Washington	Return to Olympus (1995)
Mark Arm		Seattle, Washington	
Melvins	1983–present	Montesano, Washington	Gluey Porch Treatments (1987); Ozma (1989); Bullhead (1991); Lysol (1992); Houdini (1993); Prick (1994); Stoner Witch (1994); Stag (1996); Honky (1997); The Maggot (1999); The Bootlicker (1999); The Crybaby (2000); Electroretard (2001); Hostile Ambient Takeover (2002); Pigs of the Roman Empire (w/ Lustmord) (2004); Never Breathe What You Can't See (w/ Jello Biafra) (2004); Sieg Howdy! (w/ Jello Biafra) (2005); (A) Senile Animal (2006); Nude with Boots (2008); The Bride Screamed Murder (2010); Freak Puke (2012); Everybody Loves Sausages (2013); Tres Cabrones (2013); Hold It In (2014); Three Men and a Baby (w/ Mike) (2016); Basses Loaded (2016); A Walk with Love & Death (2017); Pinkus Abortion Technician (2018); Working with God (2021); Five Legged Dog (2021); Bad Mood Rising (2022); Tarantula Heart (2024)
Mother Love Bone	1988–1990	Seattle, Washington	Apple (1990)
Mono Men	1987–1998, 2006, 2013	Bellingham, Washington	Stop Dragging Me Down (1990); Wrecker (1992)
Mudhoney	1988–present	Seattle, Washington	Mudhoney (1989); Every Good Boy Deserves Fudge (1991); Piece of Cake (1992); My Brother the Cow (1995); Tomorrow Hit Today (1998); Since We've Become Translucent (2002); Under a Billion Suns (2006); The Lucky Ones (2008); Vanishing Point (2013); Digital Garbage (2018); Plastic Eternity (2023)
My Sister's Machine	1988–1994	Seattle, Washington	Diva (1992); Wallflower (1993)

== N ==
Band	Years active	Origin	Studio albums
Napalm Beach	1981–present	Portland, Oregon	Rock And Roll Hell (1984); Pugsley (1984); Teen Dream (1985); Liquid Love (1988); Moving To And Fro (1989); Fire Air And Water (1990); Thunder Lizard (1991); Curiosities (1993); In My Tree (1994)
Nirvana	1987–1994	Aberdeen, Washington	Bleach (1989); Nevermind (1991); In Utero (1993)
Nudeswirl	1989–1995	New Brunswick, New Jersey	Nudeswirl (1989); Nudeswirl (1993)
The Nymphs	1985–1992	New Jersey	The Nymphs (1991)

== P ==
Band	Years active	Origin	Studio albums
Paw	1990–2000, 2008	Lawrence, Kansas	Dragline (1993); Death to Traitors (1995); Home Is a Strange Place (2000)
Pearl Jam	1990–present	Seattle, Washington	Ten (1991); Vs. (1993); Vitalogy (1994); No Code (1996); Yield (1998); Binaural (2000); Riot Act (2002); Pearl Jam (2006); Backspacer (2009); Lightning Bolt (2013); Gigaton (2020); Dark Matter (2024)
Pond	1991–1998	Portland, Oregon	Pond (1993); The Practice of Joy Before Death (1995); Rock Collection (1997)
The Presidents of the United States of America	1993–1998 / 2000–2002 / 2003–2016	Seattle, Washington	The Presidents of the United States of America (1995); II (1996); Freaked Out and Small (2000); Love Everybody (2004); These Are the Good Times People (2008); Kudos to You! (2014)

== S ==
Band	Years active	Origin	Studio albums
Screaming Trees	1985–2000	Ellensburg, Washington	Clairvoyance (1986); Even If and Especially When (1987); Invisible Lantern (1988); Buzz Factory (1989); Uncle Anesthesia (1991); Sweet Oblivion (1992); Dust (1996); Last Words: The Final Recordings (2011)
Seaweed	1989–2000, 2007–present	Tacoma, Washington	Weak (1992); Four (1993); Spanaway (1995); Actions and Indications (1998)
Skin Yard	1985–1993	Seattle, Washington	Skin Yard (1986); Hallowed Ground (1988); Fist Sized Chunks (1990); 1000 Smiling Knuckles (1991); Inside the Eye (1993)
Skunk	1986–1991	Maplewood, New Jersey	Last American Virgin (1989); Laid (1991)
The Smashing Pumpkins	1988–2000, 2006–Present	Chicago, Illinois	Gish (1991); Siamese Dream (1993); Mellon Collie & the Infinite Sadness (1995); Adore (1998); Machina/The Machines of God (2000); Machina II/The Friends & Enemies of Modern Music (2000); Zeitgeist (2007); Oceania (2012); Monuments to an Elegy (2014); Shiny and Oh So Bright, Vol. 1 / LP: No Past. No Future. No Sun. (2018); Cyr (2020)
Smile	1992–2003	Orange County, California	Maquee (1994); Girl Crushes Boy (1998)
Solomon Grundy	1989–1990	Ellensburg, Washington	Solomon Grundy (1990)
Soundgarden	1984–1997, 2010–2017, 2019	Seattle, Washington	Ultramega OK (1988); Louder Than Love (1989); Badmotorfinger (1991); Superunknown (1994); Down on the Upside (1996); King Animal (2012)
Splendora	1995–2002	New York City, New York	In the Grass (1995)
Sponge	1992–2000, 2001–present	Detroit, Michigan	Rotting Piñata (1994); Wax Ecstatic (1996); New Pop Sunday (1999); For All the Drugs in the World (2003); The Man (2005); Galore Galore (2007); Stop the Bleeding (2013); The Beer Sessions (2016); Lavatorium (2021); 1994 (2024)
Stone Temple Pilots	1985–2002, 2008–present	San Diego, California	Core (1992); Purple (1994); Tiny Music... Songs from the Vatican Gift Shop (1996); No. 4 (1999); Shangri-La Dee Da (2001); Stone Temple Pilots (2010); Stone Temple Pilots (2018); Perdida (2020)
Sweet Water	1990–present	Seattle, Washington	Sweet Water (1992); Superfriends (1995); Suicide (1999); Clear The Tarmac (2009)

== T ==
Band	Years active	Origin	Studio albums
Tad	1987–1999, 2013	Seattle, Washington	God's Balls (1989); 8-Way Santa (1991); Inhaler (1993); Infrared Riding Hood (1995)
Temple of the Dog	1990–1992	Seattle, Washington	Temple of the Dog (1991)
Treepeople	1988–1994	Boise, Idaho	No Mouth Pipetting (1989); Time Whore (1990); Guilt Regret Embarrassment (1991); Something Vicious For Tomorrow (1992); Just Kidding (1993); Actual Re-Enactment (1994)
Tripping Daisy	1990–1999	Dallas, Texas	Bill (1992); I Am An Elastic Firecracker (1995); Jesus Hits Like The Atom Bomb (1998); Tripping Daisy (2000)
Truly	1990–1998, 2000, 2008–present	Seattle, Washington	Fast Stories... from Kid Coma (1995); Feeling You Up (1997); Twilight Curtains (2000)

== V ==
Band	Years active	Origin	Studio albums
Veruca Salt	1992–2012 / 2013–Present	Chicago, Illinois	American Thighs (1994); Eight Arms To Hold You (1997); Resolver (2000); IV (2006); Ghost Notes (2015)

== W ==
Band	Years active	Origin	Studio albums
Willard	1989–1992	Seattle, Washington	Steel Mill (1992); Underground (2018)
Wool	1990–1996	Washington, D.C. based out of Los Angeles, California	Budspawn (1992); Box Set (1994); Lunar Momento: Lost Rancho Session 1 (2012); Lunar Momento: Lost Rancho Session 2 (2012)

== See also ==
- Grunge
- List of grunge albums
- Alternative rock
- Alternative metal
- Post-grunge
- List of alternative rock artists
- List of alternative metal artists
