= Nick DiDia =

Record producer, engineer and mixer

- Origin: New Jersey, U.S.
- Occupation: Record producer
- Years active: 1980–2025
- Website: nickdidia.com

Nick DiDia is a record producer, engineer, mixer and designer. He has worked with a variety of artists, including Bruce Springsteen, Rage Against the Machine, Pearl Jam, and Powderfinger.

== Selected discography ==
Releases	Band
Bachelor No. 2 or, the Last Remains of the Dodo	Aimee Mann
Magnolia: Music from the Motion Picture	Aimee Mann

- Aldo Nova – Blood on the Bricks
- Alice Cooper – Trash
- Anti-Flag – The Terror State
- Audioslave – Revelations
- Augustana – All the Stars and Boulevards
- Ben Folds Five – The Unauthorized Biography of Reinhold Messner
- Billy Falcon – Pretty Blue World
- Billy Talent – Billy Talent III
- Brad – Interiors
- Brand New Immortals – Tragic Show
- The Bravery – The Sun and the Moon
- Bruce Springsteen – The Rising
- Bruce Springsteen – Live in Barcelona
- Bruce Springsteen – Devils & Dust
- Bruce Springsteen – Magic
- Bruce Springsteen – Working on a Dream
- Bruce Springsteen – High Hopes
- The Cairos – Dream of Reason
- Caroline's Spine – Monsoon
- Caroline's Spine – Attention Please
- Cinderella – Night Songs
- The Crash Motive – Just Cause It Never Happened Don't Mean It Won't
- Curtis Stigers – Curtis Stigers
- Dan Baird – Love Songs for the Hearing Impaired
- Dan Baird – Buffalo Nickel
- Danzig – Danzig III: How the Gods Kill
- Danzig – The Lost Tracks of Danzig
- Devilhead – Pest Control
- El Pus – Hoodlum Rock Vol. 1
- The Gaslight Anthem – Handwritten
- Glenn Danzig – Black Aria
- God Street Wine – $1.99 Romances
- Gorky Park – Gorky Park
- Green Apple Quick Step – Reloaded
- The Honeydogs – Seen a Ghost
- Incubus – A Crow Left of the Murder...
- Incubus – Alive at Red Rocks
- Incubus – Light Grenades
- Jackyl – Jackyl
- Jimmy Barnes – 30:30 Hindsight
- Jonny Polonsky – The Power of Sound
- Karnivool – Asymmetry
- Kasey Chambers – Bittersweet
- Katie Noonan and the Captains – Emperor's Box
- Killswitch Engage – Killswitch Engage
- King's X – Dogman
- Korn – Issues
- The Living End – The Ending Is Just the Beginning Repeating
- Local H – Pack Up the Cats
- Local H – Half-Life E.P.
- Local H – Here Comes the Zoo
- Malfunkshun – Return to Olympus
- Martin Sexton – Wonder Bar
- Mastodon – Crack the Skye
- Mastodon – Live at the Aragon
- Matthew Sweet – 100% Fun
- Matthew Sweet – Blue Sky on Mars
- Michael Penn – Resigned
- Michael Penn – MP4: Days Since a Lost Time Accident
- Michelle Malone – Sugarfoot
- Michelle Malone – Debris
- The Music – Welcome to the North
- Neil Young – Mirror Ball
- The Nightwatchman – One Man Revolution
- Nine Days – The Madding Crowd
- Ocean Alley – Love Balloon
- The Offspring – Conspiracy of One
- The Offspring – Splinter
- Orange 9mm – Driver Not Included
- Papa Roach – Lovehatetragedy
- Patty Smyth – Patty Smyth
- Paul Westerberg – Eventually
- Pearl Jam – Vs.
- Pearl Jam – Vitalogy
- Pearl Jam – No Code
- Pearl Jam – Yield
- Pearl Jam – Backspacer
- Pearl Jam – Lightning Bolt
- Powderfinger – Internationalist
- Powderfinger – Odyssey Number Five
- Powderfinger – Vulture Street
- Powderfinger – Fingerprints: The Best of Powderfinger, 1994–2000
- Powderfinger – Golden Rule
- Rage Against the Machine – Evil Empire
- Rage Against the Machine – "The Ghost of Tom Joad"
- Rage Against the Machine – The Battle of Los Angeles
- Raging Slab – Dynamite Monster Boogie Concert
- Russell Morris – Black and Blue Heart
- Rose Hill Drive – Rose Hill Drive
- Sass Jordan – Rats
- Satchel – The Family
- Shaver – Unshaven: Live at Smith's Olde Bar
- Shawn Smith – Let It All Begin
- sleepmakeswaves – Love of Cartography
- Soulhat – Good to Be Gone
- Stone Temple Pilots – Core
- Stone Temple Pilots – Purple
- Stone Temple Pilots – Tiny Music... Songs from the Vatican Gift Shop
- Stone Temple Pilots – No. 4
- Stone Temple Pilots – Shangri-La Dee Da
- Stone Temple Pilots – Thank You
- Sun-60 – Headjoy
- Third Day – Come Together
- The Thorns – The Thorns
- Train – Drops of Jupiter
- Train – My Private Nation
- Train – For Me, It's You
- Trial Kennedy – New Manic Art
- Velvet Revolver – Libertad
- Von Grey – Von Grey
- Waax – Big Grief
- Walk the Moon – Walk the Moon
- The Wallflowers – Rebel, Sweetheart

== Awards ==
- Grammy Award for Best Rock Album 2002 The Rising (Bruce Springsteen)
- ARIA Award for Album of the Year 1999/2001/2003/2011
- ARIA Award for Best Rock Album 1999/2001/2003/2011
- ARIA Award for Best Hard Rock or Heavy Metal Album 2013
