= All the Kids Are Right =

Single by Local H

from the album Pack Up the Cats
- B-side: "Have Yourself a Merry Little Christmas"
- Released: August 1998
- Recorded: 1998
- Genre: Post-grunge
- Length: 3:48
- Label: Island
- Songwriter(s): Joe Daniels; Scott Lucas
- Producer(s): Roy Thomas Baker

Local H singles chronology
"Fritz's Corner" (1997)	"All the Kids Are Right" (1998)	"All-Right (Oh, Yeah)" (1998)

"All the Kids Are Right" is a song by American alternative rock band Local H. The song was released as the lead single from the group's third studio album Pack Up the Cats.

== Overview ==
Despite being released around the time PolyGram (the parent label of Island Records) was merging with Universal Music Group, the song went on to become the group's second most successful single. "All the Kids Are Right" charted on both the US Mod. and US Main. charts, staying there for 13 weeks and 12 weeks, respectively.

== Track listing ==
All tracks are written by Local H, except where noted

No.	Title	Writer(s)	Length
1.	"All the Kids Are Right"		3:48
2.	"Bound for the Floor"		3:42
3.	"Cha! Said the Kitty"		2:57
4.	"Have Yourself a Merry Little Christmas" (Judy Garland cover)	Ralph Blane, Hugh Martin	4:01

== Charts ==
Chart (1998)	Peak position
US Alternative Airplay (Billboard)	20
US Mainstream Rock (Billboard)	19

== Personnel ==
- Scott Lucas – vocals, guitar, bass
- Joe Daniels – drums
