= Ham Fisted =

Studio album by Local H
- Released: January 24, 1995
- Recorded: Summer 1994
- Studio: Reflection (Charlotte, North Carolina)
- Genre: Rock, grunge
- Length: 47:52
- Label: Island
- Producer: Steven Haigler

Local H chronology
Drum (1991)	Ham Fisted (1995)	As Good as Dead (1996)

Singles from Ham Fisted
- 1. "Cynic" Released: 1994; 2. "Mayonnaise and Malaise" Released: 1994

Professional ratings
Review scores
Source	Rating
AllMusic	2.5/5 stars
Robert Christgau	(3-star Honorable Mention)
The Encyclopedia of Popular Music	3/5 stars
Kerrang!	4/5 stars
MusicHound Rock	2.5/5 stars
The Rolling Stone Album Guide	2/5 stars

Ham Fisted is the debut studio album by American alternative rock band Local H. It was released through Island Records in January 1995. Two songs, "Cynic" and "Mayonnaise and Malaise", were released as airplay singles in 1994, though the album failed to chart. A music video for "Cynic" was directed by Jodi Wille and released in February 1995. In 2025, for its 30th anniversary, the band released a re-recorded version titled reFISTED.

== Critical reception ==
Trouser Press wrote that Ham Fisted "offers an entertaining haymaker of cranked- up, stripped-down '95 noise." Robert Christgau gave the album a three-star "honourable mention", comparing it to two releases by Nirvana by calling the album "brighter than Bleach, less fly than Incesticide". Newsday called it "a spell-binding display of neurotic rock and roll at its finest." The Morning Call listed the album among the best of 1995, labeling it "a metallic punk-grunge KO."

== Track listing ==
All songs written by Scott Lucas and Joe Daniels.

No.	Title	Length
1.	"Feed"	2:38
2.	"Cynic^{[a]}^{[b]}"	5:01
3.	"Mayonnaise and Malaise^{[a]}^{[c]}"	4:46
4.	"User^{[c]}^{[d]}"	2:50
5.	"Manipulator^{[e]}"	4:09
6.	"Bag of Hammers"	2:39
7.	"Scott-Rock"	3:27
8.	"Sports Bar"	5:37
9.	"Chicago Fanphair '93"	4:01
10.	"Strict-9^{[b]}"	6:12
11.	"Skid Marks"	5:04
12.	"Grrrlfriend"	1:28

^{a} appears on ICON: The Island Years compilation (2011)
^{b} demo recording appears on Twenty-Five Years of Skin in the Game compilation (2015)
^{c} re-recorded song from Local H's self-titled demo (1992)
^{d} live recording appears on Live in Europe (2018)
^{e} live recording appears on Alive '05 (2005)

== Personnel ==
Local H

- Scott Lucas – vocals, guitar, bass guitar
- Joe Daniels – drums

Production

- Steven Haigler – producer, engineering, mixing at The Carriage House (Stamford, Connecticut)
- Dave Cozzie – assistant mix engineer
- Tracy Schroeder – additional engineering
- Janet DeMatteis – art coordination
- Jana Leòn – photography
- David Calderley – design
- Joe Bosso – A&R
- Bob Ludwig – mastering at Gateway Mastering Studios, Inc. (Portland, Maine)
