= Hallelujah! I'm a Bum (album) =

Studio album by Local H
- Released: September 18, 2012
- Recorded: 2012
- Genre: Alternative rock
- Length: 60:47
- Label: Slimstyle
- Producer: Sanford Parker

Local H chronology
Local H's Awesome Mix Tape #1 (2010)	Hallelujah! I'm a Bum (2012)	Hey, Killer (2015)

Professional ratings
Aggregate scores
Source	Rating
Metacritic	80/100
Review scores
Source	Rating
AllMusic	4/5 stars
PopMatters	9/10
Revolver	3.5/5 stars
Tiny Mix Tapes	4/5 marks

Hallelujah! I'm a Bum is the seventh studio album by Chicago-based rock band Local H. Interviews with the band have revealed that it is a concept album based on politics in the United States. Although the album was completed in spring of 2012, the band chose to release it in September as to be closer to the 2012 presidential election. The album makes frequent use of the sounds of the Chicago “L” train to transition between songs.

The album's title is inspired by the Al Jolson film of the same name.

The song "Look Who's Walking on Four Legs Again" is performed by Scott Lucas's second band Scott Lucas and the Married Men.

== Track listing ==
No.	Title	Length
1.	"Waves"	1:51
2.	"Cold Manor"	4:05
3.	"Night Flight to Paris"	3:57
4.	"They Saved Reagan's Brain"	4:46
5.	"Blue Line"	4:55
6.	"Another February"	4:30
7.	"Say the Word"	5:20
8.	"Cold and Mannered"	1:39
9.	"Trash Fire Bummers"	1:14
10.	"Feed a Fever"	3:09
11.	"Here Come Ol' Laptop"	3:20
12.	"Look Who's Walking on Four Legs Again"	3:47
13.	"Ruling Kind"	3:41
14.	"Limit Your Change"	2:06
15.	"Paddy Considine"	4:26
16.	"Sad History"	5:09
17.	"Waves Again"	6:12

== Personnel ==
- Scott Lucas – guitar, vocals, bass, synthesizer, organ
- Brian St. Clair – drums
- Dave Lugo, Felix Pinero, and Mike Grogan – additional vocals on tracks 4 and 9
- Jeb Bishop – trombone on track 11
- Bruce Lamont – trombone on track 11, saxophone on track 14
- Dave Rempis – saxophone on track 11
- Jamie Branch – trumpet on track 11
- Sanford Parker – recording and mixing
- Andy Gerber – additional mixing
- Collin Jordan – mastering

== Charts ==
Chart (2012)	Peak position
US Top Current Albums (Billboard)	187
US Heatseekers Albums (Billboard)	8
US Independent Albums (Billboard)	46
