= Live in Europe (Local H album) =

Live album by Local H
- Released: February 6, 2018
- Recorded: January – March 2017
- Genre: Alternative rock
- Label: G&P Records
- Producer: Local H

Local H chronology
| Hey, Killer (2015) | Live in Europe (2018) | Lifers (2020) |

Live In Europe is a live album by Local H, which is composed of recordings made during the band's early 2017 European tour with Helmet. The album was released on February 6, 2018, in order to coincide with their 2018 European tour, and was released through G&P Records, the band's official merchandiser.

== Track listing ==
| No. | Title | Length |
|---|---|---|
| 1. | "Nothing Special" | 4:31 |
| 2. | "Fritz's Corner" | 2:27 |
| 3. | "Heavy Metal Bakesale" | 1:56 |
| 4. | "High-Fiving MF" | 6:20 |
| 5. | "The Misanthrope" | 3:14 |
| 6. | "City of Knives" | 2:59 |
| 7. | "Freshly Fucked" | 2:06 |
| 8. | "Leon and the Game of Skin" | 6:08 |
| 9. | "Bound for the Floor" | 3:45 |
| 10. | "Jesus Christ! Did You See the SIZE of that Sperm Whale?" | 2:37 |
| 11. | "Hands on the Bible" | 5:37 |
| 12. | "That's What They All Say" | 8:20 |
| 13. | "Creature Comforted" | 3:47 |
| 14. | "User" | 2:29 |
| 15. | "The One With Kid" | 5:39 |
| 16. | "Half-Life" | 3:33 |
| 17. | "Back In the Day" | 3:32 |
| 18. | "John the Baptist Blues" | 7:09 |

== Personnel ==
- Scott Lucas - guitar, vocals
- Ryan Harding - drums
- Randy Payne - layout, design
- Eddie Applebaum - management
- Andy Gerber - mixing
- John Oakes - photography
- Dave Lugo - recording
