= Whatever Happened to P.J. Soles? =

Studio album by Local H
- Released: April 6, 2004
- Recorded: February–November 2003
- Genre: Alternative rock
- Length: 59:53
- Label: Studio E
- Producer: Local H, Andy Gerber

Local H chronology
The No Fun EP (2003)	Whatever Happened to P.J. Soles? (2004)	Alive '05 (2005)

Singles from Whatever Happened to P.J. Soles?
- 1. "Everyone Alive" Released: March 14, 2004; 2. "California Songs" Released: June 15, 2004

Professional ratings
Review scores
Source	Rating
AllMusic	4/5 stars
Blender	3/5 stars
Fort Worth Star-Telegram	A
In Music We Trust	B
Melodic	2.5/5 stars
Punknews.org	4/5 stars
Rolling Stone	3/5 stars
The Rolling Stone Album Guide	3.5/5 stars

Whatever Happened to P.J. Soles is the fifth studio album by the alternative rock band Local H. It was released on April 6, 2004, on Studio E Records. It received an Australian release doubled with Alive '05 on July 16, 2007. "California Songs" and "Hey, Rita" have become staples at many of Local H's live performances. The album is Scott Lucas' favourite Local H record.

The album title references P.J. Soles, an American actress, known for her roles in John Carpenter's 1978 horror film Halloween, the 1979 musical comedy Rock N Roll High School, and Ivan Reitman's 1981 comedy Stripes.

== Track listing ==
No.	Title	Length
1.	"Where Are They Now?"	1:23
2.	"Everyone Alive"	3:56
3.	"California Songs"	4:09
4.	"Dick Jones"	5:25
5.	"Money on the Dresser"	2:13
6.	"P.J. Soles"	4:19
7.	"How's the Weather Down There?"	3:46
8.	"Buffalo Trace"	10:14
9.	"Heaven on the Way Down"	2:26
10.	"Hey, Rita"	3:58
11.	"Heavy Metal Bakesale"	2:30
12.	"Mellowed"	4:53
13.	"That's What They All Say"	7:37
14.	"Halcyon Days (Where Were You Then?)"	3:04

== Personnel ==
- Scott Lucas – guitar, percussion, bass, vocals
- Brian St. Clair – drums
- Zak Schneider – mellotron on "Dick Jones"
- Eric Oblander – harp on "Money on the Dresser"
- Annie – photography
- Kii Arens – photography, layout design, set design
- Elizabeth Chesney – cover model
- Matt Leatherman – assistant
- Rodney Mills – mastering
- Geoff Sabin – help
