= Alive '05 =

Live album by Local H
- Released: September 13, 2005
- Recorded: September 17, 2004
- Genre: Alternative rock
- Length: 72:09
- Label: Cleopatra Records/Only Music (Australia)
- Producers: Local H, Andy Gerber

Local H chronology
Whatever Happened to P.J. Soles? (2004)	Alive '05 (2005)	'99-'00 Demos (2006)

Alternate image
- An image from the booklet, although it is sometimes referred to as the cover

Singles from Alive '05
- 1. "Toxic" Released: 2005

Professional ratings
Review scores
Source	Rating
Allmusic	link

Alive '05 is a live album by the alternative rock band Local H. It was released on September 13, 2005 on Cleopatra Records.

It is the first official live album released by the band. The album is compiled from a couple live shows, one of which was on September 17, 2004 in Chicago at The Metro. The last track on the album is a studio recording of a cover of "Toxic", originally performed by Britney Spears. The CD also contains 4 fan made music videos, two for "Cooler Heads" and one each for "No Fun" and "California Songs".

The album is also known by other names. The front cover says Local H Comes Alive!—a take on Frampton Comes Alive!, the spine says "LOCAL H – LIVE" on one side and "LOCAL H – DEAD" on the other, and the inside image says Alive '05, which is what the band calls the album.

On July 16, 2007 it received an Australian release doubled with Whatever Happened to P.J. Soles?

== Track listing ==
All songs by Local H unless otherwise noted.

1. "Everyone Alive" – 4:22
2. "Bound for the Floor – 3:34
3. "Lovey Dovey – 2:36
4. "Heaven on the Way Down – 2:29
5. "Hands on the Bible – 4:21
6. "Manipulator – 4:16
7. "All the Kids Are Right – 3:21
8. "All-Right (Oh, Yeah) – 3:44
9. "Hey, Rita – 5:00
10. "Deep Cut – 2:05
11. "President Forever – 3:34
12. "How's the Weather Down There? – 3:30
13. "Fritz's Corner – 3:35
14. "Creature Comforted – 3:50
15. "No Problem – 6:23
16. "California Songs – 4:02
17. "Hi-Fiving MF – 7:54
18. "Toxic" (Cathy Dennis, Henrik Jonback, Christian Karlsson, Pontus Winnberg) – 5:54

== Personnel ==
- Brian St. Clair – drums
- Scott Lucas – vocals, guitar, bass
- Gabe Rodriguez – tambourine, backing vocals on track 7, 8, & 13
