= Local H's Awesome Mix Tape 1 =

EP by Local H
- Released: October 19, 2010
- Genre: Alternative rock
- Length: 32:02
- Labels: G&P Records

Local H chronology
Twelve Angry Months (2008)	Local H's Awesome Mix Tape 1 (2010)	Hallelujah! I'm a Bum (2012)

Professional ratings
Review scores
Source	Rating
AllMusic	3.5/5 stars

Local H's Awesome Mix Tape #1 is an EP by the alternative rock band Local H. It was released on October 19, 2010, on the band's own G&P Records. The EP features covers that the band has performed live. The EP was released digitally, on CD as well as on a handful of cassette tapes.

== Track listing ==
No.	Title	Writer(s)	Original artist (Year)	Length
1.	"Wolf Like Me"	Tunde Adebimpe, David Sitek, Kyp Malone, Jaleel Bunton, Gerard Smith	TV on the Radio (2006)	5:14
2.	"Joey"	Johnette Napolitano	Concrete Blonde (1990)	4:15
3.	"Puss"	David Yow, Duane Denison, David Wm. Sims, Mac McNeilly	The Jesus Lizard (1992)	3:22
4.	"Spiderbite"	Ben Perrier, Ben Thomas	Winnebago Deal (2006)	2:27
5.	"Blood Stains"	Mike Palm	Agent Orange (1980)	1:50
6.	"Time"	David Gilmour, Nick Mason, Roger Waters, Richard Wright	Pink Floyd (1973)	7:48
7.	"For Lovers"	Peter Wolfe, Julian Taylor, Pete Doherty, Matt White, Maff Scott, Ned Scott	Wolfman ft. Pete Doherty (2004)	4:25
8.	"Last Caress" (hidden track)	Glenn Danzig	Misfits (1980)	2:41

== Personnel ==
- Scott Lucas – guitar, vocals, bass
- Brian St. Clair – drums
