= Big Nothing =

2006 film by Jean-Baptiste Andrea

- UK theatrical release poster
- Directed by: Jean-Baptiste Andrea
- Written by: Jean-Baptiste Andrea; Billy Asher
- Produced by: András Hámor; Gabriella Stollenwerck
- Starring: David Schwimmer; Simon Pegg; Alice Eve; Jon Polito; Natascha McElhone; Mimi Rogers
- Cinematography: Richard Greatrex
- Edited by: Antoine Vareille
- Music by: Alan Anton
- Production companies: Pathé Productions; Ingenious Film Partners; Isle of Man Film
- Distributed by: Pathé Distribution
- Release dates: 18 November 2006 (Cardiff Film Festival); 1 December 2006 (United Kingdom)
- Running time: 86 minutes
- Countries: United Kingdom; Canada
- Language: English
- Budget: £3 million

Big Nothing is a 2006 black comedy crime film directed by Jean-Baptiste Andrea, starring David Schwimmer, Simon Pegg and Alice Eve. It had its world premiere at the Cardiff Film Festival on 18 November 2006, and was released in the United Kingdom on 1 December 2006.

Big Nothing was filmed on the Isle of Man and in Wales at Barry in the Vale of Glamorgan and at Caerwent and other areas of Monmouthshire. Other scenes were at Squamish, British Columbia, Canada.

== Plot ==
In a small Oregon town, a brutal serial killer nicknamed the "Oregon undertaker" has been murdering and mutilating young women. Charlie is an ex-teacher who is fired on his first day as a call center employee. His colleague Gus invites him to join a plot to blackmail a reverend, about whose visits to porn websites he has obtained evidence. Teenage pageant queen Josie McBroom overhears them planning the scam, and insists on joining the scheme.

The trio call the reverend to demand a blackmail payment. Gus goes to the reverend's house, while Charlie goes to a bar where he plans to set up an alibi for Gus. On telling people at the bar that Gus went to a gas station, he finds that the gas station attendant is in the bar, ruining the alibi. He leaves and hurries to the reverend's house. Finding the body of the reverend there, and no sign of Gus, he disposes of the body in a septic tank. It transpires that the reverend shot Gus in the leg, and Gus knocked him out with a vase, meaning that he was still alive when Charlie put him into the septic tank.

The two discover videos of the reverend torturing and killing a young woman. A deputy policeman then calls at the house in search of the reverend, who he says has been found dead with three gunshot wounds. As the deputy leaves, he discovers drag marks leading to the septic tank. Gus knocks him out with a vase. The reverend's wife arrives, and threatens Gus, Charlie and the deputy with a gun. Josie arrives and attacks her with an axe. The deputy attempts to escape, but while trying to climb through a window, falls and hits his head, killing himself.

Charlie, Gus, and Josie flee the scene. After nearly having a car accident with a fat man, they continue to their disposal point, only to find that one of the bodies is missing. They drive back and hit the Reverend's wife, who had jumped out of the car and was trying to get help. As they look over the body, two police officers arrive, one of them being Charlie's wife, and quickly see the body. Charlie's wife tries to call her deputy, but it goes to voicemail. Josie hurriedly makes up a story, but the three are taken to the station where a special agent is waiting.

Agent Hymes, the fat man the three almost got into an accident with, examines the body with Gus and Josie. In the waiting room, Charlie finds his sleeping daughter, who could not be left alone at the house and was brought by his wife, and gives her his coat. Charlie, Gus and Josie drive to a tar pit, where they plan to dispose of the bodies, but they find that the special agent has been following them. The agent then reveals that Josie is the Wyoming Widow; a murderer who befriended men and killed them with whiskey laced with highly concentrated thallium. She is found to be carrying a flask of whiskey; she drinks some to prove that it is not poisoned, but the agent escapes during the distraction. While the others search for him, Gus tries to flee with the money, but is caught by the agent, who complains of his lack of payment for what he does. He shoots and kills Gus, and takes the money. In the meantime, Charlie's wife finds the badge of her deputy in her husband's coat, but drives to a bridge and throws it off.

The agent runs to his car, but is surprised by Josie and Charlie. They make him eat a large sugary lollipop, putting him into a diabetic coma. Josie pulls a gun on Charlie and explains that she really is the Wyoming Widow. She gives him the choice of the bullet or the poisoned whiskey (from her second flask). Charlie tells her not to spend all the money in one place, and drinks the whiskey. Josie discover that the bag is filled with nothing but his daughter's stuffed animals as Charlie collapses and dies. At home, Charlie's daughter is seen drawing with marker on some of the hundred dollar bills next to several large stacks of money.

Josie tries to hitch a ride away from Oregon, and finally gets one from an old man. The old man goes to the back to "double-check on something", while Josie takes out the poisoned whiskey. The old man covers a bloody leg with a tarpaulin, and goes back into the truck to drive away with Josie. The last scene reveals a car plate from Oregon at the rear of the truck.

== Cast ==
- Simon Pegg as Gus
- David Schwimmer as Charlie Wood
- Alice Eve as Josie McBroom
- Natascha McElhone as Penelope Wood
- Mimi Rogers as Mrs. Smalls
- Jon Polito as FBI Agent Hymes
- Sarah Edmondson as Isabella
- Julian Glover as 80-year-old Man
- Amber Sealey as Call center supervisor
- Shauna Shim as Melanie #1
- Laurence Bouvard as Melanie #2
- Colin Stinton as Max
- Mitchell Mullen as Reverend Smalls
- Clair Elsmore as Snuff Movie Victim
- Kenneth Jay as Barman
- William Rosenfeld as Deputy Garman

== Production ==
Big Nothing was filmed over thirty-two days in January 2006. Locations included the Isle of Man and Wales in the areas of Barry, Vale of Glamorgan, Caerwent, and Monmouthshire. It was also shot in Squamish, British Columbia, Canada.

== Release ==
Big Nothing had its world premiere at the Cardiff Film Festival on 18 November 2006. It was released in the United Kingdom and Ireland on 1 December 2006, and had its European market release on 15 March 2007. It was not released theatrically in North America. The film was released on DVD by 20th Century Home Entertainment on 16 April 2007.

== Reception ==
=== Critical response ===
On Rotten Tomatoes, the film has an approval rating of 38% based on reviews from 13 critics.

Empire gave the film three out of five stars, commenting that "the tone shift is a little too extreme for mainstream success, but Schwimmer and Pegg provide a solid, blackly comic centre to an original crime caper." The BBC also gave the film three out of five stars, praising Pegg and Schwimmer's performances, particularly noting that Pegg had "reinvented himself" with his role.

Yahoo! Movies praised the film, calling it "slick, sharp and smartly underplayed – Big Nothing amounts to quite a bit in the end."

=== Box office ===
Big Nothing grossed £83,829 in its first weekend in the UK, after release in 101 cinemas.

== Soundtrack ==
The following songs were featured in the film.

1. "Bound for the Floor" – Performed by Local H (Written by Scott Lucas)
2. "Hands on the Bible" – Performed by Local H (Written by Scott Lucas)
3. "Engel" – Written and performed by Rammstein
4. "Blinking Lights (For You)" – Performed by Eels (Written by Mark Oliver Everett)
5. "But I Did Not" – Written and performed by Howe Gelb
6. "Fin De Siècle" – Performed by Noir Désir, remixed by Andrej (Written by Bertrand Cantat and Noir Désir)
7. "Money (That's What I Want)" – Performed by Barrett Strong (Written by Janie Bradford and Berry Gordy)
8. "Love of the Loveless" – Performed by Eels (Written by Mark Oliver Everett))
9. "Stabat Mater" – Composed by Giovanni Battista Pergolesi
10. "Sacred Darling" – Performed by Gogol Bordello (Written by Eugene Hütz)
11. "The Soldier" – Written and performed by Martin Craft
12. "Sister Sister" – Written and performed by Baxter Dury

== See also ==
- List of films featuring diabetes
