= The No Fun EP =

EP by Local H
- Released: May 27, 2003
- Recorded: 2003
- Genre: Alternative rock
- Length: 28:26
- Label: Thick
- Producer: Local H, Andy Gerber

Local H chronology
Here Comes the Zoo (2002)	The No Fun EP (2003)	Whatever Happened to P.J. Soles? (2004)

Professional ratings
Review scores
Source	Rating
AllMusic	4/5 stars
Robert Christgau	(3-star Honorable Mention)
PopMatters	(favorable)
Punknews.org	4/5 stars
Rolling Stone	3/5 stars

The No Fun EP is an EP by American alternative rock duo Local H. It was released by Thick Records on May 27, 2003. The EP features six songs, three originals and three covers. The covers include the Godfathers' "Birth, School, Work, Death", the Ramones' "I Just Want Something to Do", and "Fuck Yeah, That Wide", which isn't a direct cover, but features lyrics based on Primal Scream's song "Kill All Hippies" from their album XTRMNTR.

"Birth, School, Work, Death" was previously released on a vinyl 7" split single with the Blank Theory. The three originals, "No Fun", "President Forever", and "Cooler Heads", all started out as demos recorded during the sessions for Local H's previous album, Here Comes the Zoo. The demo versions were later featured on '99-'00 Demos, released in 2006.

It is generally, and incorrectly, assumed that "President Forever" was written with George W. Bush in mind, but the song was actually written by Scott Lucas in 1999, prior to Bush ever running for president; following the invasion of Iraq, the lyrics were given a light update and the song was rushed onto the EP. Lucas made note of this in the '99-'00 Demos liner notes, saying of the song: "THAT, ladies and gentlemen, is prescience."

== Track listing ==
All songs by Local H unless otherwise noted

1. "No Fun" – 4:40
2. "President Forever" – 3:23
3. "Birth, School, Work, Death" (The Godfathers) – 4:14
4. "Cooler Heads" – 3:34
5. "I Just Want Something to Do" (Joey Ramone) – 2:48
6. "Fuck Yeah, That Wide" (Primal Scream, Local H) – 9:47
  - The liner notes claim words by Primal Scream and music by "every band who's ever done this shit before."
  - This title is a reference to a Mr. Show sketch called "It's Insane, This Guy's Taint"

== Personnel ==
- Scott Lucas – vocals
- Brian St. Clair – drums
- Kii Arens – photography, package design
- Local H – production
- Andy Gerber – production, engineering, recording
- Andy VanDette – mastering
