= P. J. Soles =

American and German actress (born 1950)

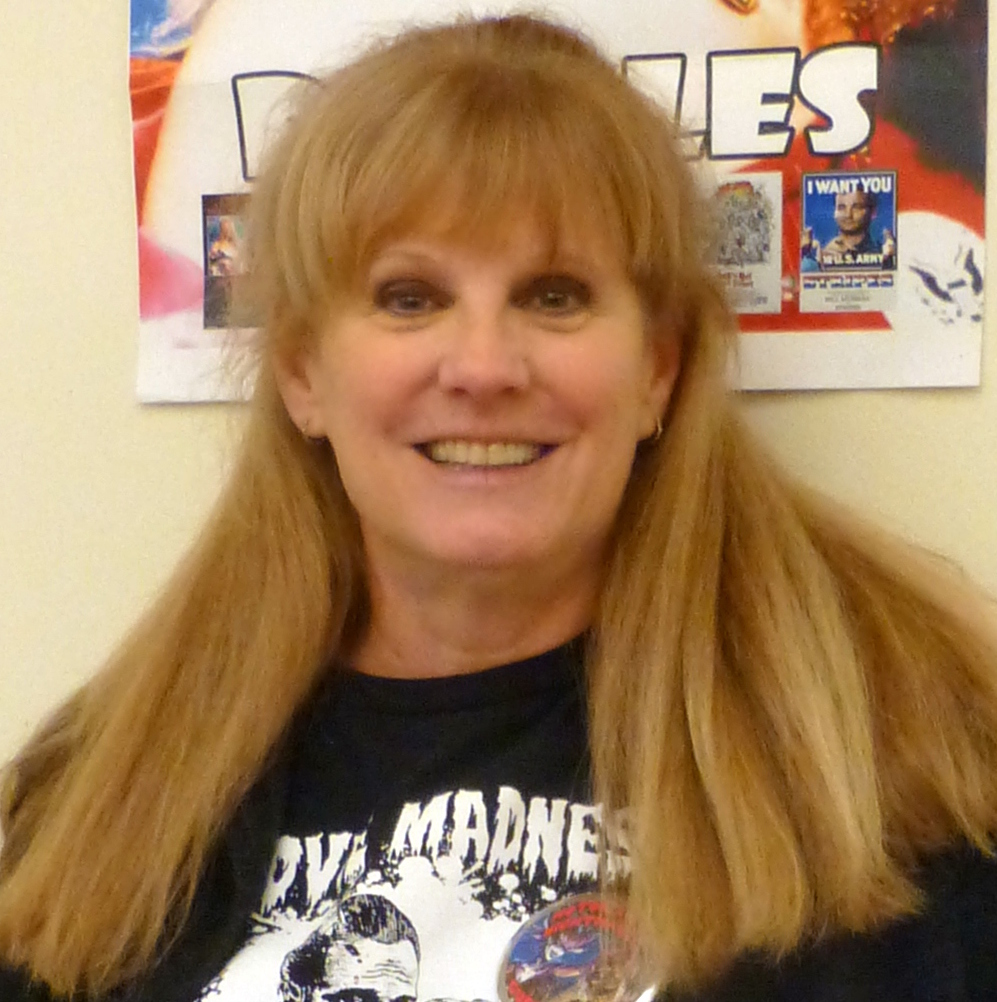
- Soles in 2015
- Born: Pamela Jayne Hardon; July 17, 1950 (age 76); Frankfurt, West Germany
- Occupation: Actress
- Years active: 1973–2019
- Spouses: J. Steven Soles (m. 1973; div. 1975) Dennis Quaid (m. 1978; div. 1983) Skip Holm (m. 1983; div. 1998)
- Children: 2

Pamela Jayne Soles (née Hardon; born July 17, 1950) is a German and American actress. She made her film debut as Norma Watson in Brian De Palma's Carrie (1976) before portraying Lynda van der Klok in John Carpenter's Halloween (1978) and Riff Randell in Allan Arkush's Rock 'n' Roll High School (1979).

She has since appeared in a variety of films, including Breaking Away (1979), Private Benjamin (1980), Stripes (1981), Sweet Dreams (1985), and Jawbreaker (1999), and cult classics such as The Devil's Rejects (2005) and Beg (2011). She has been regarded as a scream queen.

== Early life ==
Soles was born Pamela Jayne Hardon in Frankfurt, Germany, to a German mother, Nancy Hardon (née Seiden), and a Dutch father from Rotterdam, Cornelis Johannes Hardon II. Her maternal grandparents were Jewish emigrants from Lithuania and Austria. At the time of her birth, her father was working for an international insurance company and the family moved all over the world. Soles lived in Casablanca, Morocco, and Maracaibo, Venezuela, where she learned to speak fluent Spanish, and then Brussels, Belgium, where she went to high school at the International School of Brussels.

Soles attended Briarcliff College in White Plains, New York, later transferring to Georgetown University, and had aspirations to become the first woman ambassador to the Soviet Union. This career goal changed when she visited the Actors Studio in New York City, and Soles was inspired to pursue acting.

== Career ==
Soles moved to Manhattan and began acting in commercials and modeling for fashion magazines. In 1974, she was hired by director Perry Henzell to portray a shampoo model in his film No Place Like Home. It would have been her first film appearance, but Henzell was not able to complete the film until 2006. She relocated to Los Angeles in 1975.

She was among the hundreds of actors auditioning for Brian De Palma and George Lucas in their joint casting session for Carrie (1976) and Star Wars (1977). She originally auditioned for the role of Princess Leia in Star Wars, but the role ultimately went to Carrie Fisher. However, she was cast as Norma Watson in De Palma's Carrie. She starred alongside Sissy Spacek, Nancy Allen, John Travolta, Amy Irving, and Piper Laurie. Originally, her character was just a minor role with only one line, but De Palma liked her so much that he expanded her role, as the secondary antagonist to Allen's Chris Hargensen. Soles was injured on the set during filming, when a blast from a fire hose during the prom scene ruptured her eardrum.

The same year, she reunited with Carrie co-star John Travolta in Randal Kleiser's television film The Boy in the Plastic Bubble. Subsequently, she went to Georgia to film Our Winning Season (1978) and met actor Dennis Quaid. They were married in 1978 in Texas on a dude ranch, and both appeared in the film Breaking Away in 1979.

Soles as Lynda van der Klok in Halloween (1978)

She is most remembered for her performance as Lynda van der Klok in the classic horror film Halloween (1978) directed by John Carpenter, the final victim of the character Michael Myers. Carpenter wanted her for his film Halloween after seeing Carrie. He wrote the role of Lynda specifically for her because of the way she said the word "totally".

The following year, Soles was cast as Riff Randell in the musical comedy film Rock 'n' Roll High School (1979) with the Ramones. She has a singing credit for a second version of the title song on the movie's soundtrack. She reprised the role of Riff Randell in the artwork for the album Whatever Happened to P.J. Soles? by Local H.

In 1980, Soles portrayed Private Wanda Winter in the comedy film Private Benjamin. The following year, she portrayed a military police officer who becomes Bill Murray's girlfriend, Stella Hansen, in the comedy film Stripes. In 1981, she filmed a new scene to be inserted into the television version of Halloween.

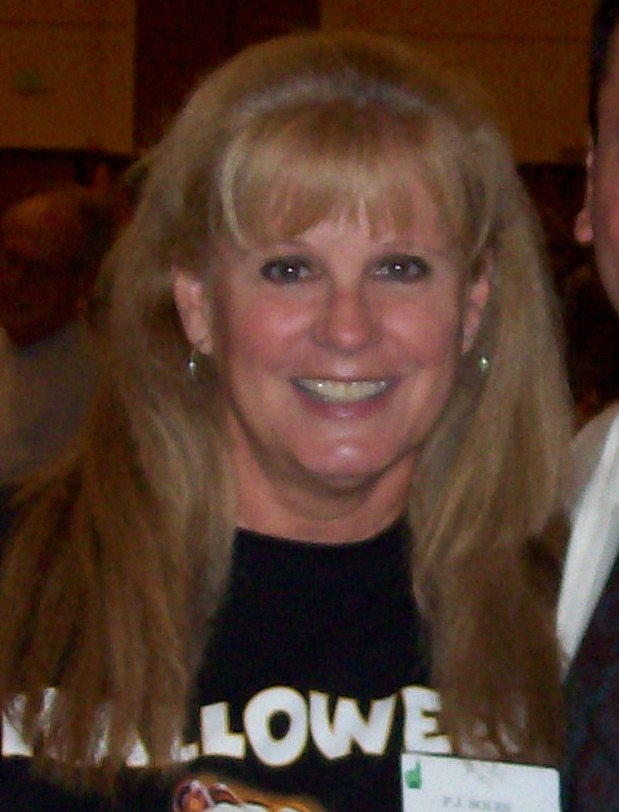
Soles in 2008

In 1985, Soles starred alongside Jessica Lange as Wanda in Karel Reisz's biographical film Sweet Dreams. In 1999, Soles was cast in the black comedy film Jawbreaker. Soles appeared in the Donnas' music video for "Too Bad About Your Girl" (2003) as her character Riff Randell from Rock 'n' Roll High School. In 2005, Soles played the victim, Susan, of a family on a murderous rampage in the Rob Zombie movie The Devil's Rejects. In 2012, she starred alongside Barbara Steele, Heather Langenkamp, Camille Keaton, and Adrienne King in The Butterfly Room.

In 2018, Soles was cast in a speaking cameo role as a teacher in the direct sequel, Halloween, directed by David Gordon Green.

== Personal life ==
She married J. Steven Soles in 1973, when she resided in New York City, but then made the move to Los Angeles to work in television and movies. Soles and she subsequently divorced in 1975, although she decided to retain the name P.J. Soles as her stage name. She was later married to actor Dennis Quaid, whom she met on the set of the film Our Winning Season, from 1978 until their divorce in early 1983. Later that same year, she married Skip Holm, who was a stunt pilot on The Right Stuff (1983). They have a son named Sky (born 1983) and a daughter named Ashley (born 1988). Holm and she divorced in 1998.

== Filmography ==
=== Film ===
Year	Title	Role	Director
1975	Blood Bath	(undetermined role)	Joel M. Reed
1976	Carrie	Norma Watson	Brian De Palma
1978	Our Winning Season	Cindy Hawkins	Joseph Ruben
1978 (Note: Soles also appeared in the extended cut of Halloween, where she appeared in one additional scene, filmed in 1981, for the television premiere of the film broadcast October 1981.)	Halloween	Lynda Van Der Klok	John Carpenter
1979	Old Boyfriends	Sandy	Joan Tewkesbury
1979	Breaking Away	Suzy	Peter Yates
1979	Rock 'n' Roll High School	Riff Randell	Allan Arkush
1980	Private Benjamin	Pvt. Wanda Winter	Howard Zieff
1981	Stripes	Stella Hansen	Ivan Reitman
1981	Soggy Bottom, USA	Sharlene	Theodore J. Flicker
1984	Listen to the City	Sophia	Ron Mann
1984	Innocent Prey	Cathy Wills	Colin Eggleston
1985	Sweet Dreams	Wanda	Karel Reisz
1988	Saigon Commandos	Jean Lassiter	Clark Henderson
1989	B.O.R.N.	Liz	Ross Hagen
1990	Alienator	Tara	Fred Olen Ray
1991	Soldier's Fortune	Debra	Arthur N. Mele
1995	The Power Within	Mrs. Applegate	Art Camacho
1996	Uncle Sam	Madge Cronin	William Lustig
1997	Little Bigfoot	Carolyn	Art Camacho
1999	Jawbreaker	Mrs. Purr	Darren Stein
2000	Blast	Deputy	Martin Schenk
2000	Mirror Mirror 4: Reflections	Annika's Mom	Paulette Victor-Lifton
2001	Kept	Celia	George Santo Pietro
2002	Silence (short)	Jan	Mateen Osayande Kemet
2005	Pee Stains and Other Disasters	Jenny	Jon Carnoy
2005	Murder on the Yellow Brick Road	Hannah Gruber	Ross Hagen
2005	The Devil's Rejects	Susan	Rob Zombie
2005	Death by Engagement	Mrs. Starkington	Philip Creager
2006	The Tooth Fairy	Mrs. MacDonald	Chuck Bowman
2006	Ray of Sunshine	Mother	Norbert Meisel
2006 (Note: Photographed in 1974. Completed in 2006, and released on DVD in 2009.)	No Place Like Home	P.J.	Perry Henzell
2006	Dead Calling	Valerie Redmond	Mike Nichols
2007	Mil Mascaras vs. the Aztec Mummy	(undetermined role)	Jeff Burr; Chip Gubera
2008	Love in the Age of Fishsticks	God (voice)	Yun Shin
2008	Prank	Marianne	Danielle Harris; Heather Langenkamp
2008	Alone in the Dark II	Martha	Michael Roesch; Peter Scheerer
2009 (Note: Filmed in 1983.)	Imps* (segment: "Soda")	Young Lady	Scott Mansfield
2011	Beg	Eva Fox	Kevin MacDonald
2012	Eternal	Lucinda	Derek Rimelspach
2012	The Butterfly Room	Lauren	Jonathan Zarantonello
2013	Chastity Bites	Lea's Mom (voice)	John V. Knowles
2016	Grindsploitation (segment: "Arbor Day")	Dr. Ramone	Jim Towns
2017	November First (short)	Barista	
2018	Halloween	Teacher (voice cameo)	David Gordon Green
2019	No Place like Home: Redux	P.J.	Perry Henzell
2019	Candy Corn	Marcy Taylor	Josh Hasty
2019	Killer Therapy	Dr. Emily Lewis	Barry Jay
2019	Hanukkah	Mrs. Horowitz	Eben McGarr
2019	13 Girls	Medical Examiner	Jim Towns
TBA	Another Ice Cream Man	Karen	Clint Howard; Carmelo Chimera

=== Television ===
Year	Title	Role	Notes
1973	Love Is a Many Splendored Thing	(undetermined role)	Unknown episode(s)
1976	The Blue Knight	Minnesota	"Upward Mobility" (S2E3)
1976	The Boy in the Plastic Bubble	Deborah	TV movie
1977	The Possessed	Marty	TV movie
1977	Alexander: The Other Side of Dawn	(undetermined role, uncredited)	TV movie
1977	Calling Doctor Storm, M. D.	Sarah Baynes	Short TV movie
1978	Zuma Beach	Nancy	TV movie
1982	Romance Theatre	Cassie	"The Awakening of Cassie" (5 parts)
1983	The Other Woman	Mary Louise	TV movie
1983	Sawyer and Finn	Becky Thatcher	TV movie
1983	Simon & Simon	'Crazy Susan' Sackwell	"D.J., D.O.A." (S3E2)
1984	Cheers	Julie	"Rebound: Part 2" (S3E2)
1984	Airwolf	Ellie	"HX-1" (S2E8)
1984	Simon & Simon	Martin Collins	"Our Fair City" (S4E10)
1985	Hardcastle and McCormick	Ellen Styner	"Something's Going on on This Train" (S3E4)
1986	Knight Rider	Ellen Whitby	"Out of the Woods" (S4E14)
1994	Rebel Highway	Evelyn Randall	"Shake, Rattle and Rock!"
1995	Out There	Religious Nut	TV movie

=== Other credits ===
Additional credits

- B.O.R.N. (1989, associate producer)
- Prize Fighter (1993 video game, as 'June')
- Cheap Rodeo: First Night in Heaven (2013 short film, composer)
- Clown Motel (2016 short film, associate producer)

Self appearances

- 'Halloween' Unmasked 2000 (1999, video short documentary)
- Acting 'Carrie' (2001, video short documentary)
- Halloween: A Cut Above the Rest (2003 TV documentary)
- E! True Hollywood Story (2004, episode: "Scream Queens")
- Super Secret Movie Rules (2004, episode: "Slashers")
- Stars & Stripes 1 (2004, video short documentary)
- Stars & Stripes 2 (2004, video short documentary)
- Backstory (2005, episode: "Carrie")
- 30 Days in Hell: The Making of 'The Devil's Rejects' (2005, video documentary)
- Horror's Hallowed Grounds (2006, episode: "Halloween")
- Halloween: The Shape of Horror (2006 short)
- Working with a Master: John Carpenter (2006, video short documentary)
- Halloween: 25 Years of Terror (2006, video documentary)
- The Horrorhound (2007, video documentary)
- Halloween: The Inside Story (2010, TV documentary)
- Staying After Class (2010, video short)
- AM Northwest (2011, episode: "Actress PJ Soles")
- Framelines (2011, Season 1, Episode 5)
- Still Screaming: The Ultimate Scary Movie Retrospective (2011, documentary)
- Underground Entertainment: The Movie (2011, documentary)
- Without Your Head (2011, podcast, episode: "P.J. Soles")
- Up from Down (2013, host)
- Midnight Matinee Psycho (2013, video)
- Psychotic State (2014 film)
- The 50 Best Horror Movies You've Never Seen (2014, documentary)
- Quickies (2015, episode: "P.J. Soles")
- Horror Kung-Fu Theatre (2015–19, 3 episodes)
- Where It Was Made (2015, episode: "Halloween")
- More Acting 'Carrie' (2016, video short documentary)
- Horror Icon: Inside Michael's Mask with Tony Moran (2016, documentary)
- Looking Back on 'Innocent Prey' - A Conversation with P.J. Soles (2017, video short)
- The Bill Murray Experience (2017, documentary)
- Pickle's Horror Show (2019, episode: "The Ghostman & Rivera Special - Seatbelt Safety")
- Time Warp: The Greatest Cult Films of All-Time, Parts 1-3 (2019, miniseries documentary)
- Class of '79: 40 Years of Rock 'N' Roll High School (2019, video documentary)

== In popular culture ==
- American alternative rock band Local H released an album in 2004 entitled Whatever Happened to P.J. Soles? The album also includes a song entitled "P.J. Soles".
- Soles is the subject of the song "Sweet Pamela Jayne" by English rock band The Breakdowns, from their 2014 album Rock 'n' Roller Skates. The song refers to the film Rock 'n' Roll High School in its lyrics.
