= Twelve Angry Months =

Studio album by Local H
- Released: May 13, 2008
- Recorded: 2007
- Genre: Alternative rock
- Length: 52:13
- Label: Shout! Factory

Local H chronology
'99-'00 Demos (2006)	Twelve Angry Months (2008)	Local H's Awesome Mix Tape #1 (2010)

Singles from Twelve Angry Months
- 1. "24 Hour Break-Up Session" Released: May 17, 2008; 2. "Machine Shed Wrestling" Released: April 20, 2009

Professional ratings
Aggregate scores
Source	Rating
Metacritic	72/100
Review scores
Source	Rating
AllMusic	3.5/5 stars
Blender	4/5 stars
Consequence of Sound	C−
Pitchfork	6.3/10
PopMatters	7/10
The Skinny	2/5 stars
Spin	6/10

Twelve Angry Months is a concept album by the alternative rock band Local H. It was released on May 13, 2008, on Shout! Factory. The album is about experiences surrounding a relationship breakup, with each track corresponding to a month in the year after the break-up. The title is an allusion to Twelve Angry Men. The first single is "24 Hour Break-Up Session". The album was scheduled for a UK release on August 18, 2008, however this was delayed for unknown reasons until August 25, 2008. The song 'Blur' is a revised version of a song that appears on the band's EP The '92 Demos.

== Track listing ==
All tracks are written by Scott Lucas and Brian St. Clair.

No.	Title	Length
1.	"The One with 'Kid" (January)	4:46
2.	"Michelle (Again)" (February)	2:46
3.	"BMW Man" (March)	3:15
4.	"White Belt Boys" (April)	4:30
5.	"The Summer of Boats" (May)	3:51
6.	"Taxi-Cabs" (June)	4:28
7.	"24 Hour Break-Up Session" (July)	5:09
8.	"Jesus Christ! Did You See the Size of That Sperm Whale?" (August)	2:32
9.	"Simple Pleas" (September)	4:33
10.	"Machine Shed Wrestling" (October)	4:54
11.	"Blur" (November)	2:38
12.	"Hand to Mouth" (December)	8:49

== Personnel ==
- Scott Lucas – guitar, vocals, bass, synthesizer, organ
- Brian St. Clair – drums

Production

- Andy Gerber
- Brian Leach
- Scott Lucas
- Geoff Sabin
- Blaise Barton
- Mike Willison
- Micah Wilshire (mixing)
- Michael Chalecki (mastering)
