= No Fun =

No Fun may refer to:

- "No Fun" (The Stooges song), a song by The Stooges on their 1969 album The Stooges
- "No Fun" (Joji song), a song by Joji on his 2018 album Ballads 1
- "No Fun" (Incubus song), a song by Incubus on their 2017 album 8
- The No Fun EP by Local H, 2003
