= The Prairie Cartel =

American rock band

- Origin: Chicago, Illinois, United States
- Genres: Electro, electronica, alternative rock
- Members: Scott Lucas; Blake Smith; Mike Willison; Daniel Marsden

The Prairie Cartel is an American rock music band from Chicago, Illinois, United States, whose music and name is featured in a radio station in Grand Theft Auto: Chinatown Wars and a song in Grand Theft Auto IV. The band consists of former members of Fig Dish and Caviar as well as Scott Lucas of Local H. The Prairie Cartel has played shows with other notable electronica acts including Klaxons and Simian Mobile Disco.

== Band members ==
- Scott Lucas
- Blake Smith
- Mike Willison
- Daniel Marsden

== Discography ==
=== "Long Nights, Impossible Odds" 12" (2008) ===
- A Side:
  - 1. "Fuck Yeah, That Wide"
  - 2. "Keep Everybody Warm"
- B Side:
  - 1. "Homicide" (999 cover)
  - 2. "Keep Everybody Warm" (Acid Jacks Rejack)

=== Where Did All My People Go (2009) ===
1. "Keep Everybody Warm"
2. "Suitcase Pimp"
3. "Lost All Track Of Time"
4. "Cracktown"
5. "Beautiful Shadow"
6. "Homicide"
7. "Narcotic Insidious"
8. "10 Feet of Snow"
9. "Jump Like Chemicals"
10. "No Light Escapes Here"
11. "Cobraskin Briefcase"
12. "Burning Down The Other Side"
13. "Magnetic South"
14. "Fuck Yeah That Wide"
15. "The Glow Is Gone"
