= Here Comes the Zoo =

Studio album by Local H
- Released: March 5, 2002
- Recorded: 2001
- Genre: Alternative rock
- Length: 62:04
- Label: Palm Pictures
- Producer: Jack Douglas

Local H chronology
Half-Life E.P. (2001)	Here Comes the Zoo (2002)	The No Fun EP (2003)

Alternative cover
- The later, non-lenticular cover

Singles from Here Comes the Zoo
- 1. "Half-Life" Released: October 17, 2001; 2. "Hands on the Bible" Released: March 12, 2002

20th Anniversary cover

Professional ratings
Review scores
Source	Rating
AllMusic	3/5 stars
Robert Christgau	(2-star Honorable Mention)
Entertainment Weekly	B+
PopMatters	(unfavourable)
Rolling Stone	3.5/5 stars
The Rolling Stone Album Guide	3/5 stars
Spin	7/10

Here Comes the Zoo is the fourth studio album by American rock band Local H, released on March 5, 2002, through Palm Pictures. This was their first album not released on Island Records. Starting with this album, every release so far has been on a different label.

The album was originally released with a lenticular cover, with two images of Scott Lucas and Brian St. Clair. Later printings were not lenticular, and only included the image of Lucas on the cover.

The album was originally to be released in late 2001 but it got delayed to 2002 due to the effects of the 9/11 attacks.

On September 12, 2022, the album was reissued as a 2-CD set for purchase on the band's website. The first disc features the original 10 tracks, while the second is a compilation of rough mixes from Here Comes the Zoo recording sessions. These rough mixes include the original 10 album tracks plus four others: three B-sides ("Static Age", "25 or 6 to 4", "Stick to What You Know") and one track that was later featured on The No Fun EP in 2003 (Cooler Heads).

== Track listing ==
All tracks are written by Local H.

No.	Title	Length
1.	"Hands on the Bible"	3:57
2.	"Half-Life"	3:39
3.	"Son of "Cha!"	3:16
4.	"5th Ave. Crazy"	2:37
5.	"(Baby Wants To) Tame Me"	9:14
6.	"Rock & Roll Professionals"	4:06
7.	"Keep Your Girlfriend"	3:10
8.	"Creature Comforted"	4:10
9.	"Bryn-Mawr Stomp"	2:41
10.	"What Would You Have Me Do?"	25:14
Total length:		1:02:09

=== 20th anniversary bonus disc ===
All tracks are written by Local H, except where noted.

No.	Title	Writer(s)	Length
1.	"Hands on the Bible (Original Jack Douglas Mix)"		3:57
2.	"Keep Your Girlfriend Away from Me (Original Jack Douglas Mix)"		3:09
3.	"Rock & Roll Professionals (Original Jack Douglas Mix)"		4:06
4.	"Son of "Cha!" (Original Jack Douglas Mix)"		3:17
5.	"Static Age (Jack Douglas Rough Mix)"	Glenn Danzig	2:46
6.	"5th Ave. Crazy (Jack Douglas Rough Mix)"		2:38
7.	"(Baby Wants To) Tame Me (Jack Douglas Rough Mix)"		8:30
8.	"Bryn-Mawr Stomp (Jack Douglas Rough Mix)"		2:36
9.	"Cooler Heads (Jack Douglas Rough Mix)"		3:30
10.	"Creature Comforted (Jack Douglas Rough Mix)"		3:59
11.	"Half-Life (Jack Douglas Rough Mix)"		3:40
12.	"25 or 6 to 4 (Jack Douglas Rough Mix)"		3:54
13.	"What Would You Have Me Do? (Jack Douglas Rough Mix)"		14:37
14.	"Stick to What You Know"		2:41
Total length:			1:03:19

== Personnel ==
- Scott Lucas – Guitar, Songwriter, Vocals
- Brian St. Clair – Songwriter, Drums, Vocals
- Simantha Sernaker – Performer on "Hands on the Bible"
- Wes Kidd – Performer on "Half-life" and "(Baby Wants to) Tame Me"
- Maxton Koc – Performer on "5th Ave. Crazy", "Rock & Roll Professionals" and "Keep Your Girlfriend"
- Shanna Kiel – Performer on "5th Ave. Crazy"
- Josh Homme – Performer on "Rock & Roll Professionals" - credited as J.Ho
- Jerry Only – Performer on "Keep Your Girlfriend"
- Gabe Rodriguez – Performer on "Keep Your Girlfriend"
- Michael Alago – A&R
- Nick DiDia – Mixing
- Jack Douglas – Producer
- Andy Gerber – Demo Engineer
- John Hanti – Assistant
- Areos Ledesma – Demo Engineer
- George Marino – Mastering
- Jay Messina – Engineer
- Ryan Williams – Mixing Engineer
- Tony Wright Cover art

== Chart positions ==
Chart (2002)	Peak position
US Heatseekers Albums (Billboard)	29
US Top Independent Albums (Billboard)	13
