= Local H's Awesome Mix Tape 2 =

EP by Local H
- Released: December 16, 2014
- Genre: Alternative rock, hard rock, post-grunge
- Length: 35:21
- Label: G&P Records

Local H chronology
The Team EP (2014)	Local H's Awesome Mix Tape 2 (2014)	Hey, Killer (2015)

Local H's Awesome Mix Tape #2 is an extended play by American alternative rock duo Local H, which was released in December 2014 through their merchandiser, G&P Records. Their version of "Team" was previously released as The Team EP, which was sold exclusively through live shows and from the official G&P Records website.

== Track listing ==
No.	Title	Original artist	Length
1.	"Heroes"	David Bowie	5:05
2.	"Team"	Lorde	3:04
3.	"Some Weird Sin"	Iggy Pop	3:45
4.	"Only the Strong Survive"	REO Speedwagon	4:12
5.	"God City"	Soulside	3:13
6.	"Da Funk"	Daft Punk	4:45
7.	"Evelyn Mason"	Muchacha	3:05
8.	"Isn't It a Pity"	George Harrison	7:43
9.	"Sweet Home Alabama (Short Version)"	Lynyrd Skynyrd	0:29

== Personnel ==
- Scott Lucas - Vocals, guitar
- Ryan Harding - Drums
- Anthony Herrara - Artwork, design
- Andy Gerber - Recording
- Greg Norman - Recording
