= Scott Lucas and the Married Men =

American folk-rock band

Scott Lucas and The Married Men
- Origin: Chicago, Illinois, United States
- Genres: Indie, folk, alternative rock
- Years active: 2009–present
- Labels: G&P, The End
- Members: Scott Lucas; Randy Payne; Tom Szidon; Aaron Duggins; Rebecca Manthe (Rebecca Brooke M.); Jason Batchko; Peter "Pete" Muschong
- Website: scottlucasandthemarriedmen.com

Scott Lucas and the Married Men is the solo project/band of Scott Lucas, the guitarist, bassist, and lead vocalist of the alternative rock band Local H.

== Formation ==
The project started when Lucas started writing and sending songs to an ex-girlfriend in an effort to win her back. Originally the songs were not intended for release, but upon realizing he had an album's worth of material he put together a band to play with. Randy Payne and Tom Szidon were recruited from Lucas' cover band The Cold Space, and Aaron Duggins and Rebecca Manthe came from The Tossers.

== Albums and tour ==
Scott Lucas and The Married Men released their first album on February 16, 2010, titled George Lassos The Moon. The band played shows sporadically around Chicago throughout 2009, and embarked on their first multiple city tour on February 12, 2010. The Absolute Beginners EP was released on October 19, 2010.

On June 5, 2012, the band released their second studio album, entitled Blood Half Moon. The album was recorded at Steve Albini's Electrical Studio in Chicago. The band also toured the country in promotion of the record. A second EP entitled The Cruel Summer EP would follow in 2013.

== Band members ==
Current members

- Scott Lucas – lead vocals, guitar
- Jason Batchko – organ, piano
- Aaron Duggins – accordion
- Rebecca Manthe (Rebecca Brooke M.) – violin
- Peter "Pete" Muschong – guitar, backing vocals
- Randy Payne – drums
- Tom Szidon – bass, backing vocals
