= Pack Up the Cats =

Studio album by Local H
- Released: September 1, 1998
- Recorded: April–May 1998
- Studio: RTB Audio Visual Productions (Lake Havasu City, Arizona)
- Genres: Grunge; alternative rock; post-grunge
- Length: 47:38
- Label: Island
- Producer: Roy Thomas Baker

Local H chronology
| As Good as Dead (1996) | Pack Up the Cats (1998) | The '92 Demos (1999) |

Singles from Pack Up the Cats
- 1. "All the Kids Are Right" Released: August 1998; 2. "All-Right (Oh, Yeah)" Released: 1998

Pack Up the Cats is the third studio album by American alternative rock band Local H, released on September 1, 1998, through Island Records. It was their last album on Island before they split from the label, and the last with original drummer Joe Daniels. Local H described the album as "our little concept record about a shitty mid-level band". The album was released around the time when PolyGram, the parent label of Island, merged with Universal, causing the album to be all but forgotten during the transition.

== Production ==
Pack Up the Cats was recorded in six weeks between April and May 1998 at RTB Audio Visual Productions in Lake Havasu City, Arizona. In May 1998, the band mixed the album at Southern Tracks in Atlanta, Georgia. The album's working title was That Fucking Cat. The album was produced by Roy Thomas Baker, who was chosen in part because Local H was listening to classic rock while writing the songs for Pack Up the Cats. The band was hoping for a huge rock sound that wasn't overly polished.

== Critical reception ==
Professional ratings
Review scores
| Source | Rating |
|---|---|
| AllMusic | 4/5 stars |
| Chicago Sun-Times | 4/4 stars |
| Entertainment Weekly | A− |
| MusicHound Rock | 4/5 stars |
| The Philadelphia Inquirer | 3.5/4 stars |
| Rolling Stone | 3.5/5 stars |
| The Rolling Stone Album Guide | 4/5 stars |
| The Village Voice | A− |
| Wall of Sound | 77/100 |

The Hartford Courant wrote that the band has "lightened their sludgy sound on the surprisingly strong 15-track Pack Up the Cats by emphasizing melodic strength over brute force." The Sydney Morning Herald noted the "air of clipped, hard wariness" and wrote that "Local H's small-sized wall of sound has been marshalled without grandeur." The Morning Call praised the "chunky, jagged, joke's-on-me songs about the psychic dislocation that is part and parcel of the power duo's love affair with rock 'n' roll." In his review for Rolling Stone, Robert Christgau called the album "an impassioned testament of the endangered alt life." Less than two weeks after the review's publication, he stated in his Village Voice Consumer Guide: "At first I was just glad to ascertain they [Local H] weren't a fluke. Now I think they've gone and made themselves the straight rock album of the year."

Pack Up the Cats was ranked No. 20 on Spin's list of the 20 best albums of 1998, No. 17 on Robert Christgau's 1998 Dean's List, and No. 2 on Greg Kot's list of the best albums of 1998.

== Track listing ==
| No. | Title | Length |
|---|---|---|
| 1. | "All-Right (Oh, Yeah)" | 3:09 |
| 2. | "'Cha!' Said the Kitty" | 2:57 |
| 3. | "Lucky" | 0:48 |
| 4. | "Hit the Skids or: How I Learned to Stop Worrying and Love the Rock" | 4:38 |
| 5. | "500,000 Scovilles" | 1:36 |
| 6. | "What Can I Tell You?" | 4:52 |
| 7. | "Fine and Good" | 4:08 |
| 8. | "Lead Pipe Cinch" | 1:04 |
| 9. | "Cool Magnet" | 4:07 |
| 10. | "She Hates My Job" | 4:08 |
| 11. | "Stoney" | 1:41 |
| 12. | "Laminate Man" | 3:17 |
| 13. | "All the Kids Are Right" | 3:48 |
| 14. | "Deep Cut" | 2:26 |
| 15. | "Lucky Time" | 4:59 |
| Total length: | | 47:38 |

=== Bonus disc ===
1. "It's a Long Way to the Top (If You Wanna Rock 'n' Roll)" (AC/DC cover) - 4:52
2. "Answering Machine" - 7:41

== Personnel ==
Personnel per liner notes.

Local H

- Scott Lucas – vocals, guitar, bass
- Joe Daniels – drums, whistling

Guest musicians

- Dean DeLeo – guitar on "Cool Magnet"
- Brendan O'Brien – hurdy-gurdy on "It's a Long Way to the Top"

Production

- Roy Thomas Baker – producer, mixing
- Nick DiDia – engineer, mixing
- Lisa Ellis – assistant
- George Marino – mastering
- Eric Hoffman – assistant
- Ryan Williams – engineer
- Kevin Allison – assistant

== Charts ==
| Chart (1998) | Peak position |
|---|---|
| US Billboard 200 | 140 |
| US Heatseekers Albums (Billboard) | 7 |
