= As Good as Dead (album) =

Studio album by Local H
- Released: April 16, 1996
- Recorded: 1996
- Genres: Grunge; hard rock; punk rock
- Length: 49:14
- Label: Island
- Producers: Local H; Steven Haigler

Local H chronology
Ham Fisted (1995)	As Good as Dead (1996)	Pack Up the Cats (1998)

Singles from As Good as Dead
- 1. "High-Fiving MF" Released: March 25, 1996; 2. "Bound for the Floor" Released: July 15, 1996; 3. "Fritz's Corner" Released: March 1997; 4. "Eddie Vedder" Released: July 1997

As Good as Dead is the second studio album by American rock band Local H. Following lackluster sales of their debut, Ham Fisted, and under pressure from their label Island Records, the band quickly returned to the studio to record their follow-up. Released on April 16, 1996, As Good as Dead is a concept album about dead-end, small-town life based on the band's origins in Zion, Illinois. The album was positively received by critics and became an unexpected success behind its second single, "Bound for the Floor", and it ultimately sold over 320,000 copies. As Good as Dead produced three other singles: "High-Fiving MF", "Eddie Vedder", and "Fritz's Corner". It remains Local H's best-selling album to date.

== Background ==
In 1994, with record labels trying to capitalize on the popularity of grunge and alternative rock bands like Nirvana, Pearl Jam, and Soundgarden, Local H caught the attention of Polydor Records, which was then in the process of merging with Island Records. Island released the band's debut studio album, Ham Fisted, the following year, but it sold below expectations and Island pressured the band's A&R rep, Joe Bosso, to drop them. Instead, Bosso pushed them into quickly recording a follow-up before Island could cancel their contract. Ahead of the release of As Good as Dead, frontman Scott Lucas was informed by Island that the album needed to sell at least 100,000 copies for the band to remain with the label.

== Release ==
As Good as Dead was released on April 16, 1996, following the lead single "High-Fiving MF", which failed to chart. The band, however, found greater success with the album's second single, "Bound for the Floor", which rose to No. 5 on the US Alternative Billboard Chart and No. 10 on the US Hot Mainstream Rock Billboard Chart, and propelled the album into selling over 320,000 copies and a peak of No. 147 on the Billboard 200. The songs "Eddie Vedder" and "Fritz's Corner" additionally made the Top 40 on the Alternative and Mainstream Rock Billboard Charts. Encouraged by the unexpected success of As Good as Dead, Island Records greenlit a third album, Pack Up the Cats.

In 2026 the band released a 30th Anniversary remastered version of the album.

== Critical reception ==
Professional ratings
Review scores
Source	Rating
AllMusic	4/5 stars
Chicago Tribune	3/4 stars
Metal Hammer	4/5 stars
MusicHound Rock	2.5/5 stars
New Noise Magazine	5/5 stars
The Rolling Stone Album Guide	2/5 stars
Sputnikmusic	4.5/5 stars
The Village Voice	A−

Critics greeted As Good as Dead with generally positive reviews. In a four-star review, AllMusic stated that with As Good as Dead Local H stood apart from other rock bands signed in the wake of Nirvana, noting that in exploring the album's "litany of bitterness over a life that's being wasted before your very eyes," frontman Scott Lucas was one of only a few artists who could approach the "emotional resonance" of Kurt Cobain. Similarly, New Noise Magazine stated in a five-star review that it was a mistake to lump Local H in with other bands signed after grunge had become popular, writing, "As Good As Dead matches the sentiment of the era, but comes from a much more sincere place." Robert Christgau of The Village Voice awarded the album an A− rating and complimented the band for their "isometric power—that sense of tremendous force bravely exerted against implacable reality." Sputnikmusic deemed the album a "wonderful slice of apathy and cynicism that's just as punk-oriented as it is grunge-oriented."

== Legacy ==
The song Rock Star by Reece Mastin references "Eddie Vedder." "Eddie Vedder" features the lyrics, "If I was Eddie Vedder, would you like me any better?" while "Rock Star," in turn, features the lyrics, "If I was Eddie Vedder, I'd bet you'd like me better"

== Track listing ==
All tracks are written by Local H.

No.	Title	Length
1.	"Manifest Density Pt. 1"	0:51
2.	"High-Fiving MF"	4:50
3.	"Bound for the Floor"	3:42
4.	"Lovey Dovey"	2:57
5.	"I Saw What You Did and I Know Who You Are"	3:16
6.	"No Problem"	4:14
7.	"Nothing Special"	3:59
8.	"Eddie Vedder"	3:29
9.	"Back in the Day"	3:35
10.	"Freeze-Dried (F)lies"	4:00
11.	"Fritz's Corner"	2:51
12.	"O.K."	6:53
13.	"Manifest Density Pt. 2"	4:37

== Personnel ==
Local H

- Scott Lucas – vocals, guitar, bass
- Joe Daniels – drums

Production

- Steven Haigler – producer, engineer
- Local H – producer
- Andy Katz – engineer

== Charts ==
Chart (1996)	Peak position
US Billboard 200	147
US Heatseekers Albums (Billboard)	6

== Release history ==
Region	Date	Format	Label	Ref.
United States	April 16, 1996	CD; cassette	Island	
United States	April 15, 2016	LP	srcvinyl	
