= Bound for the Floor =

Single by Local H

from the album As Good as Dead
- B-side: "Smothered in Hugs"; "High-Fiving MF"
- Released: July 15, 1996
- Recorded: 1995
- Genre: Alternative rock; grunge
- Length: 3:42
- Label: Island
- Songwriters: Scott Lucas; Joe Daniels
- Producers: Steven Haigler; Scott Lucas; Joe Daniels

Local H singles chronology
"Mayonnaise and Malaise" (1994)	"Bound for the Floor" (1996)	"Eddie Vedder" (1997)

Music video
- "Bound for the Floor" on YouTube

"Bound for the Floor" is a song by American alternative rock duo Local H, released as the first single from their 1996 album, As Good as Dead. It was released to modern rock stations on July 15 and mainstream rock stations on July 22. It is the band's most popular single, reaching No. 5 on the Billboard Modern Rock Tracks chart and No. 10 on the Mainstream Rock Tracks chart.

== Composition ==
The song's angst-driven lyrics deal with a lack of confidence and frustration which is strongly reflected in the overall performance. Like many of Local H's songs, the guitar tuning is a half step down from standard. The song is noteworthy for the usage of the word "copacetic" in the chorus.

A music video was produced for "Bound for the Floor", which features a performance by the band strung with shots of a school building.

The video also features children playing and following the band, perhaps a representation of groupies, where they follow them to a "merry go round", then to a bar, and finally to a private concert. While the video is playing it cuts to the children occasionally writing the lyric to the song as it's sung, or the video cuts to the band playing in an abandoned building.

Clear Channel included the song on its 2001 Clear Channel memorandum due to the song's lyric.

== In popular culture ==
"Bound for the Floor" was featured in the 2006 film Big Nothing, starring Simon Pegg and David Schwimmer, as well as in the Xbox 360 video game Saints Row (also from 2006). The song was also used in the 1998 film No Looking Back, starring Jon Bon Jovi and Edward Burns, and in the 1997 film Blackrock.

The song was featured in "Hillbilly Elegy" (2020).

The song was featured in at least one episode of America's Funniest Home Videos, set to a collection of motorcycle mishap videos.

== Track listing ==
CD single
No.	Title	Length
1.	"Bound for the Floor"	3:42
2.	"Bound for the Floor" (Live at the Roxy, Los Angeles, October 18, 1995)	3:42
3.	"Smothered In Hugs" (Guided By Voices cover)	4:21

Australian CD single
No.	Title	Length
1.	"Bound for the Floor"
2.	"Bound for the Floor" (acoustic)
3.	"High-Fiving MF"

== Charts ==
Chart (1996–1997)	Peak position
Australia (ARIA)	91
US Radio Songs (Billboard)	46
US Alternative Airplay (Billboard)	5
US Mainstream Rock (Billboard)	10
