= Our Winning Season =

- Theatrical release poster
- Directed by: Joseph Ruben
- Written by: Nicholas Niciphor
- Produced by: Samuel Z. Arkoff; Joe Roth
- Starring: Dennis Quaid; Scott Jacoby; Deborah Benson
- Cinematography: Stephen M. Katz
- Edited by: Bill Butler
- Music by: Charles Fox
- Distributed by: American International Pictures
- Release date: May 1978 (U.S.)
- Running time: 92 minutes
- Country: United States
- Language: English
- Box office: $2 million

Our Winning Season is a 1978 American drama film directed by Joseph Ruben from a screenplay by Nicholas Niciphor.

== Plot ==
During the 1960s, David Wakefield is a distance runner for his high school's track and field team who hopes to compete in college.

His sister Cathy's boyfriend, Dean Berger, is a former track star who tries to advise David, telling him to be more patient during races and hold back, rather than exhausting himself by going too fast too soon. David is influenced by others in school, like friend Paul Morelli, and reassesses his life after Dean goes off to the Vietnam War and is killed.

== Cast ==
- Scott Jacoby as David Wakefield
- Deborah Benson as Alice Baker
- Dennis Quaid as Paul Morelli
- Robert Wahler as Burton Fleishauer
- Randy Hermann as Jerry McDuffy
- Joe Penny as Dean Berger
- Jan Smithers as Cathy Wakefield
- P.J. Soles as Cindy Hawkins
- Wendy Rastattar as Susie Wilson
- Damon Douglas as Miller
- Joanna Cassidy as Sheila
- J. Don Ferguson as Coach Michael Murphy
- Jeff Soracco as Eddie Rice
- Ted Henning as Mr. Wetzle
- Joe Dorsey as Officer McNally

== See also ==
- List of films about the sport of athletics
