= Lifers (album) =

Studio album by Local H
- Released: April 10, 2020
- Studios: Electrical Audio, Chicago
- Genres: Alternative rock, grunge
- Length: 55:00
- Label: AntiFragile Music
- Producer: Andy Gerber

Local H chronology
Live in Europe (2018)	Lifers (2020)	Local H's Awesome Quarantine Mix Tape 3 (2021)

Professional ratings
Review scores
Source	Rating
AllMusic	4/5 stars
Slant Magazine	4/5 stars

Lifers (stylized in all caps as LIFERS) is the ninth studio album by American alternative rock duo Local H, released on April 10, 2020, through AntiFragile. The album features the band working with engineer Steve Albini and appearances from Juliana Hatfield and John McCauley of Deer Tick.

The album was released on digital, CD, vinyl, and cassette tape formats. The record marks the second full-length studio recording to feature Ryan Harding on drums.

The album was preceded by a single for "Patrick Bateman", a song named after the American Psycho character. The single, which features a cover of Motörhead's "We Are the Road Crew" as the b-side, was released digitally on July 4, 2019, and as a 7" single on December 12, released by G&P Records.

== Track listing ==
All tracks are written by Local H.

No.	Title	Length
1.	"Patrick Bateman"	2:57
2.	"Hold That Thought"	3:19
3.	"High, Wide and Stupid"	3:41
4.	"Turn the Bow"	4:30
5.	"Winter Western"	3:28
6.	"Beyond the Valley of Snakes"	7:12
7.	"Sunday Best"	4:58
8.	"Demon Dreams"	4:11
9.	"Farrah"	4:15
10.	"Defy and Surrender"	10:12
11.	"Innocents"	6:16

== Personnel ==
Local H

- Scott Lucas - vocals, guitar
- Ryan Harding - drums

Additional personnel

- Juliana Hatfield - vocals (on "Winter Western")
- John McCauley (Deer Tick) - backing vocals (on "High, Wide and Stupid")
- Gabe Rodriguez - backing vocals (on "High, Wide and Stupid")
- Blake Smith - backing vocals (on "High, Wide and Stupid")
- John Haggerty (Naked Raygun, Pegboy) - guitar solo (on "Beyond the Valley of Snakes")
- The Chase Bliss Choir - falsetto gang vocals (on "Sunday Best")

Production

- Andy Gerber - producer, recording; mixing on "Sunday Best"
- Local H - producer
- Steve Albini - recording
- J. Robbins - mixing
- Nick Tveitbakk - additional recording
- Dave Lugo - additional recording
- Dan Coutant - mastering
