= Half-Life E.P. =

Half-Life (E.P.)

EP by Local H
- Released: 2001
- Recorded: 2001
- Genre: Alternative rock, grunge
- Length: 12:53
- Label: Palm Pictures
- Producer: Jack Douglas

Local H chronology
The '92 Demos (1999)	Half-Life (E.P.) (2001)	Here Comes the Zoo (2002)

Half-Life E.P. is an EP released by Local H in 2001. It was released as a teaser for their album Here Comes the Zoo, which included the title track. The other songs include two covers, "Static Age" by The Misfits and "25 or 6 to 4" by Chicago, and a b-side, "Stick to What You Know".

== Track listing ==
Track listing
No.	Title	Length
1.	"Half-Life" (Scott Lucas, Brian St. Clair)	3:39
2.	"Static Age" (Glenn Danzig)	2:42
3.	"25 or 6 to 4" (Robert Lamm)	3:51
4.	"Stick to What You Know" (Scott Lucas, Brian St. Clair)	2:41

== Personnel ==
- Scott Lucas – vocals, guitar, bass
- Brian St. Clair – drums
