= Von Grey =

American indie rock band

VON GREY
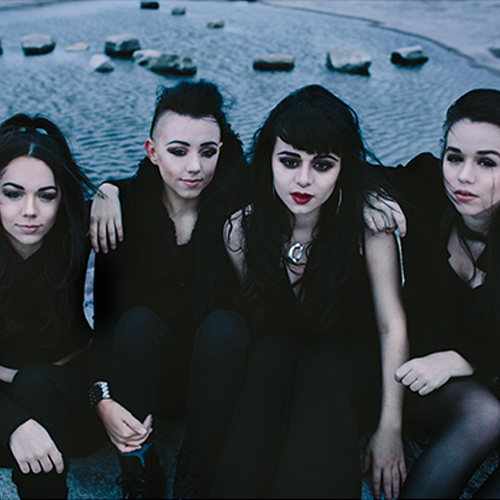
- Von Grey in 2015

Background information
- Origin: Atlanta, Georgia, United States
- Genres: Indie, alternative, rock
- Members: Kathryn von Grey; Annika von Grey; Fiona von Grey
- Past members: Petra von Grey
- Website: vongreymusic.com

Von Grey is an American indie rock band from Atlanta, Georgia, formed in 2011 by sisters Annika, Fiona, and Kathryn von Grey.

== Album history ==
The band were signed to Red Light Management in 2011. As a four piece, the band released a self-titled EP that was recorded with producer Nick DiDia on October 2, 2012. In 2012, toured as support to Lindsey Stirling and Company of Thieves.

Von Grey made their network television debut in February 2013 on The Late Show with David Letterman, followed by an appearance on Rock Center with Brian Williams in March 2013 and Conan on April 2, 2013. The band also performed at the 2013 Bonnaroo.

On January 21, 2014, Von Grey released their second EP, Awakening. The release was supported by nationwide tours with Ron Pope, Parachute, and the Indigo Girls, as well as a performance at Austin City Limits Music Festival.

The band's third studio EP, Panophobia, was released on August 14, 2015, and showcased the band's evolution to a genre NYLON Magazine called "haunting, moody indie rock."

On April 28, 2017, the band released a single, "Poison In The Water", from their forthcoming EP, Trinity, following a brief hiatus. In a May 2017 interview at Paste Studios in New York, Annika von Grey called the break "development which was really healthy for us creatively and emotionally."

Trinity's followup single, 6 AM, premiered on NPR's First Listen on June 29, 2017. Of the track, acclaimed music journalist Bob Boilen wrote, "ethereal and catchy don't often make a perfect pair within pop music, but the combination is exactly what hooked me on VON GREY, an Atlanta trio formed by the siblings Kathryn, Annika and Fiona von Grey." The self-directed video for the song premiered on One's To Watch late August 2017.

The Trinity EP was released commercially on December 8, 2017.

On May 7, 2018, VON GREY premiered a new single, "Plans" in Billboard Magazine and announced In Bloom: Acoustic, a new, self-produced six-song EP set for release on July 20, 2018.
