= El Pus =

US rap rock group

- Origin: Atlanta, Georgia, U.S.
- Genres: Rap rock, hip hop
- Label: Virgin/EMI Records
- Members: Cufrock; Cosmo; Tchaka "Kiko" Diallo; Johnny Rock; Cosmo; Woodchuck; YoungPete Alexander
- Past members: Anthony David; Enrique
- Website: www.myspace.com/elpus

El Pus (pronounced El Poose) was an American rap rock group from Atlanta.

The members formed the group in the early 1990s and released their first album Strange Cowboys in 1998 under Vagabond Productions. Rapper Speech of Arrested Development worked in the studio with the group, and Virgin Records signed El Pus and released the group's major label debut, Hoodlum Rock—Vol. 1 in 2005. Christian Hoard of Rolling Stone panned the album. David Jeffries of allmusic.com praised the album, considering it a combination of hard rock and crunk rap.

== Discography ==
- 1998: Strange Cowboys
- 2004: What Is El Pus? - EP
- 2005: Hoodlum Rock Vol. 1
- 2019: Strange Cowboys (2019 Remaster)
