= Nudeswirl =

American alternative and grunge rock band

- Nudeswirl in 1993

Background information
- Origin: New Brunswick, New Jersey, United States
- Genres: Grunge; alternative rock
- Years active: 1988–1995
- Labels: Megaforce Records
- Members: Dizzy Cortright; Shane M. Green; Chris Wargo; Woody Newland
- Past members: Mike Toro

Nudeswirl was an American alternative and grunge rock band from New Brunswick, New Jersey.

== Biography ==
Nudeswirl was formed in 1989 by Shane M. Green, Chris Wargo, and drummer Mike Toro in New Brunswick, New Jersey. The band released an independent full-length LP titled Nudeswirl in 1989. In 1992, they signed to Megaforce Records and released their second self-titled album the following year. They toured with White Zombie, Danzig, Flotsam and Jetsam, Mindfunk and performed on the 1992 Lollapalooza side stage. Music videos for "F Sharp" and "Buffalo" received airplay on Headbangers Ball, 120 Minutes and Beavis and Butt-Head.

The band was known for dark, earthy atmospherics combining guitar feedback, attacks of wah-wah, tribal/teutonic rhythms, rolling basslines and wavering lyrically obscured vocals. Combining musical styles from rock to metal, from alternative to psychedelic, all the while infusing feedback throughout.

Nudeswirl disbanded in 1995 after their only major label release. Considered a cult band almost 20 years later, other bands such as Tool and Radiohead cite Nudeswirl amongst their influences and they have been hailed by Perry Farrell, John Frusciante and the Edge. Nudeswirl's CD has been out of print, which relegates them further into the depths of cult obscurity. Guitarist Dizzy Cortright went on to play with The Mad Daddies. Vocalist/guitarist Shane M. Green went on to play with Slaprocket and Lord Sterling. Bassist Chris Wargo formed his band Love Gas and opened Gas Works recording studio.

The last known performance by the band was a reunion show during the mid-2000s at The Court Tavern in New Brunswick, New Jersey. A video exists of the band playing the Dynamo Open Air Festival in the Netherlands in front of 30,000 people and an MTV Europe interview exists as well.

== Members ==
- Dizzy Cortright (guitar)
- Shane M. Green (vocals/guitars)
- Woody Newland (drums)
- Chris Wargo (bass/background vocals)
- Mike Toro (drums) 1989–91

== Discography ==
Cover for 1989 album

- Nudeswirl (1989)
- Nudeswirl (1993)
