= Steven Haigler =

American record producer

Steven Haigler is an American record producer of alternative, grunge, hardcore, and popular music.

Notable albums Haigler has worked on include Deja Entendu (2003) by Brand New, Sunburn (1998) by Fuel, February Son (1999) by Oleander, As Good as Dead (1996) by Local H, Slip (1993) by Quicksand, and Transnational Speedway League (1993) by Clutch. His engineering credits include several Pixies albums, such as Doolittle (1989), Hunkpapa (1988) by Throwing Muses, and Workbook (1989) by Bob Mould.
