= Nudeswirl (1993 album) =

Studio album by Nudeswirl
- Released: 1993
- Recorded: Trax East Studios (South River, NJ)
- Genre: Alternative metal, grunge, noise rock, psychedelic rock
- Length: 56:27
- Label: Megaforce Records
- Producer: Nudeswirl

Nudeswirl chronology
Nudeswirl (1989 album) (1989)	Nudeswirl (1993)

Nudeswirl is the second full-length album and the first major label release by the American rock band Nudeswirl. It was released in 1993 under Megaforce Records. Two tracks from the album, "F Sharp" and "Buffalo," were issued as singles.

== Reception ==
In 2005, the album was ranked number 427 on Rock Hard magazine's list of "The 500 Greatest Rock & Metal Albums of All Time." Staff writer Alex Henderson of Allmusic awarded the album four out of five stars, stating that "the New Jersey residents put their own spin on Seattle's grunge sound, and the interesting effects and atmospherics they weave into rockers like 'Now Nothing,' 'Buffalo,' and 'Damned' indicate that Nudeswirl was intent on being recognizable and distinctive."

Professional ratings
Review scores
Source	Rating
AllMusic	4/5 stars
Rock Hard	(9.5/10)

== Track listing ==
1. "Gordon's Corner" – 5:52
2. "F Sharp" – 3:36
3. "Sooner or Later" – 5:09
4. "Disappear" – 5:10
5. "Buffalo" – 4:36
6. "Potato Trip" – 3:31
7. "Dog Food" – 4:04
8. "When I'm Dead" – 3:26
9. "Now Nothing" – 5:25
10. "Three" – 5:51
11. "Damned" - 4:37
12. "Ringworm" – 5:10

== Personnel ==
Nudeswirl

- Diz Cortright - guitar
- Shane M. Green - vocals, guitar
- Woody Newland - drums
- Christopher Wargo - bass guitar

Production

- Produced by Nudeswirl
- Engineered by Eric Rachel
- Mixed by Eric Rachel and Nudeswirl
- Mastered by Howie Weinberg
- Digital editing by Alan Douches
- Artwork by Wayne Turback
