= Stripes (film) =

1981 war comedy film by Ivan Reitman

- Theatrical release poster
- Directed by: Ivan Reitman
- Written by: Len Blum; Dan Goldberg; Harold Ramis
- Produced by: Ivan Reitman; Dan Goldberg
- Starring: Bill Murray; Harold Ramis; Warren Oates; P. J. Soles; John Candy
- Cinematography: Bill Butler
- Edited by: Harry Keller; Michael Luciano; Eva Ruggiero
- Music by: Elmer Bernstein
- Production company: Columbia Pictures
- Distributed by: Columbia Pictures
- Release date: June 26, 1981
- Running time: 106 minutes
- Country: United States
- Language: English
- Budget: $9–10 million
- Box office: $85.3 million

Stripes is a 1981 American war comedy film directed by Ivan Reitman and starring Bill Murray, Harold Ramis, Warren Oates, P. J. Soles, Sean Young, and John Candy. Ramis wrote the film with Len Blum and Dan Goldberg, the latter of whom also served as producer alongside Reitman. It tells the story of an immature taxi cab driver and his teacher friend who enlist in the United States Army with comical results. Numerous actors, including John Larroquette, John Diehl, Conrad Dunn, Judge Reinhold, Joe Flaherty, Dave Thomas, Timothy Busfield, and Bill Paxton, appear in the film in some of the earliest roles of their careers. The film's score was composed and conducted by Elmer Bernstein, and performed by the Hollywood Studio Symphony. Released on June 26, 1981, by Columbia Pictures, Stripes received generally positive reviews from critics and audiences, and was a commercial success. The film was re-released in theaters on August 29 to September 2, 2021, by Sony Pictures Releasing through its Columbia label for its 40th anniversary.

== Plot ==
In the course of one day, Louisville, Kentucky cab driver John Winger loses his job, his apartment, his car, and his girlfriend Anita, who has grown tired of his immaturity. Realizing his limited prospects, he persuades best friend Russell Ziskey to join the Army with him.

They are assigned to a basic training platoon under drill sergeant Sergeant Hulka. John irritates Hulka with his slacker attitude, and he and Russell become romantically involved with MPs Louise Cooper and Stella Hansen. After Hulka discovers that John and Russell have briefly gone AWOL, he orders Russell to scrub garbage cans for 24 hours and gives the rest of the platoon two weeks of KP duty. Russell stops John from deserting for good, angrily reminding John that it was his idea that they enlist. Louise and Stella find them fighting and return them to their barracks without reporting them.

Hulka is injured when Captain Stillman, the recruit company's commander, orders a mortar crew to fire without first setting target coordinates. Absent a leader, the platoon sneaks off base to visit a mud wrestling bar. When MPs and local police raid the club, Stella and Louise help John and Russell escape, and the four spend the night together. The rest of the platoon is reprimanded by Stillman who threatens to make them repeat basic training.

When John and Russell return to base, John motivates the disheartened platoon and begins preparing them for their graduation ceremony. After a night of practice, they oversleep and arrive late at the parade ground, where John leads them in an unorthodox but highly coordinated drill display. Impressed they completed their training without a drill sergeant, base commander General Barnicke assigns them to a secret project overseas.

The platoon reunites with a recovered Hulka in Italy, tasked with guarding the EM-50 Urban Assault Vehicle, an armored personnel carrier disguised as a recreational vehicle. John and Russell steal it to visit Stella and Louise, who are stationed in West Germany. When Stillman finds the RV missing, he launches an unauthorized mission to retrieve it, and inadvertently leads the platoon across the border into Czechoslovakia where they're captured. Hulka avoids capture by the Soviet Army and sends out a radio distress call. John, Russell, Stella, and Louise infiltrate the Soviet base in the EM-50 and rescue the platoon with aid from Hulka.

John, Russell, Louise, Stella, and Hulka return to the United States as heroes and are each awarded the Distinguished Service Cross. (Note: The second highest U.S. military decoration, after the Medal of Honor.) Hulka retires from the Army and opens a fast food restaurant; John, Russell, Stella, and Louise are featured on magazine covers; and Stillman is reassigned to a weather station in Nome, Alaska.

== Cast ==
- Bill Murray as John Winger, a former taxi cab driver who enlists in the army
- Harold Ramis as Russell Ziskey, an ESL teacher and friend of Winger who enlists in the army
- Warren Oates as Sergeant Hulka, Winger and Ziskey's drill sergeant
- P. J. Soles as Stella Hansen, a member of the military police who Winger and Ziskey befriend
- John Larroquette as Captain Stillman, the commander of the recruit company to which Winger and Ziskey are assigned
- Sean Young as Louise Cooper, a member of the military police and friend of Stella who Winger and Ziskey befriend
- John Candy as Dewey "Ox" Oxberger, a fellow recruit of Winger and Ziskey who joined to shed some pounds
- John Diehl as Howard J. "Cruiser" Turkstra
- Roberta Leighton as Anita, Winger's ex-girlfriend
- Lance LeGault as Colonel Glass
- Conrad Dunn as Francis 'Psycho' Soyer, a fellow recruit of Winger and Ziskey
- John Voldstad as Stillman's Aide
- Judge Reinhold as Elmo Blum
- Antone Pagan as Hector
- Glenn-Michael Jones as Leon
- Joe Flaherty as Border Guard
- Dave Thomas as M.C.
- Robert J. Wilke as General Barnicke, the superior of Stillman
- Bill Paxton as Unnamed Soldier
- Timothy Busfield as Mortar Soldier

== Production ==
=== Development ===
En route to the premiere of Meatballs, Ivan Reitman conceived an idea for a film: "Cheech and Chong join the army". He pitched Stripes to Paramount Pictures, who immediately greenlit the film. Len Blum and Dan Goldberg wrote the screenplay in Toronto and read it to Reitman, who was in Los Angeles, over the phone, who in turn would give the writers notes. Cheech and Chong's manager thought the script was very funny; however, the comedy duo wanted complete creative control. Reitman then suggested to Goldberg that they change the two main characters to ones suited for Bill Murray and Harold Ramis, figuring that if they could interest Ramis and let him tailor the script for the two of them, he could convince Murray to do it.

=== Casting ===
Ramis had already co-written National Lampoon's Animal House, Meatballs, and Caddyshack, but was relatively unknown as a film actor. His best-known acting work prior to Stripes was as a cast member for the late-night television sketch comedy Second City Television, which he had quit a few years earlier. Columbia Pictures did not like Ramis's audition but Reitman told the studio that he was hiring the comedian anyway. P. J. Soles reported that her husband Dennis Quaid had read for the role of Russell and that Ramis was reluctant to appear in the film, but that Murray told Ramis he did not wish to work with anyone else and would leave the film unless he played the other principal.

Casting director Karen Rea saw Conrad Dunn on the stage and asked him to read for the role of Francis "Psycho" Soyer in New York. Judge Reinhold played Elmo, who was given the best jokes from the Cheech and Chong draft of the screenplay. Sean Young was cast based on her looks, and Reitman felt that her "sweetness" would go well with Ramis. According to Reitman, Kim Basinger agreed to play Stella but her agent demanded way too much money. Three-hundred actresses were also considered for the role. P. J. Soles tested with Murray and they got along well together. John Diehl had never auditioned before and won his first paying job as an actor. Goldberg knew John Candy from Toronto and told Reitman that he should be in the film; he was not required to audition.

Reitman was a fan of the Westerns that Warren Oates had been in and wanted someone who was strong and whom everyone respected to control the film's misfit platoon. Reinhold said that during filming Oates would tell stories about working on films like The Wild Bunch and they would be enthralled. Reitman wanted "a little bit of weight in the center", and added the argument between Hulka and Winger. It was not played for laughs and allowed Murray to do a serious scene, something he had not done before. During filming one of the obstacle courses scenes, Reitman told the actors to grab Oates and drag him into the mud without telling the veteran actor about it to see what would happen and get a genuine reaction. Oates' front tooth got chipped in the process and he yelled at Reitman for what he did.

=== Filming ===
Every scene had some element of improvisation due in large part to Murray and Ramis. Much of the mud wrestling scene was made up on the spot by Reitman. Candy felt uncomfortable during filming, but Reitman talked him through it. The spatula scene in the kitchen of the general's house was filmed at three in the morning, after the cast and crew had been up the entire day. Murray improvised the "Aunt Jemima Treatment" sequence and Soles reacted naturally to whatever he said and did.

Filming began in Kentucky in November 1980 and then moved to California in December. Principal photography ended on Stage 20 at Burbank Studios on January 29, 1981. The production was allowed to shoot the army scenes at Fort Knox, the city scenes in Louisville, and the Czechoslovakia scenes at the closed Chapeze Distillery (owned by Jim Beam) in Clermont, with a budget of $9–10 million and a 42-day shooting schedule. Reitman, Goldberg, and Ramis were involved in a detailed negotiation with the Department of Defense to make the film conducive to military recruitment, in exchange for subsidies in the form of free labor and location and equipment access. As a result, requests by the Department of Defense for script rewrites were granted.

Soles said that the scene where Stella and Winger share their first kiss was supposed to be outdoors but it started raining.

Dunn remembered Candy inviting the men in the platoon to his house while filming was under way, for a homemade spaghetti dinner and to watch the famous Sugar Ray Leonard vs. Roberto Durán II No Más Fight (November 25, 1980). He recalled that he and Candy were the only two cast members who knew the lyrics to the song "Doo Wah Diddy" and taught them to the rest of the company. "I really enjoyed playing Psycho", he said.

In 1993 Murray reflected, "I'm still a little queasy that I actually made a movie where I carry a machine gun. But I felt if you were rescuing your friends it was okay. It wasn't Reds or anything, but it captured what it was like on an Army base: It was cold, you had to wear the same green clothes, you had to do a lot of physical stuff, you got treated pretty badly, and had bad coffee."

The EM-50 Urban Assault Vehicle "was built from a 1973-1978-era GMC Motorhome". It was designed to resemble "a family Winnebago — with a nice color scheme and user-friendly interior — but came with bulletproof shields and flamethrowers."

== Reception ==
=== Box office ===
Stripes was released on June 26, 1981, and grossed $1,892,000 in 1,074 screens on opening day. It placed fifth overall for the weekend with $6,152,166. It eventually grossed $85,297,000 in North America, making it the fifth most popular 1981 film at the US and Canadian box office.

=== Critical response ===
Stripes was well received by most critics. On review aggregator website Rotten Tomatoes, the film has an approval rating of 67% based on 119 reviews, with a rating average of 6.4/10. The website's critical consensus reads: "Stripes turns its well-worn premise into an irreverent showcase for Bill Murray's comic instincts, pairing sharp one-liners and gleeful anarchy with enough charm to overcome its uneven execution." On Metacritic the film has a weighted average score of 68 out of 100 based on 14 critics, indicating "generally favorable reviews".

In his Chicago Sun-Times review, Roger Ebert praised it as "an anarchic slob movie, a celebration of all that is irreverent, reckless, foolhardy, undisciplined, and occasionally scatological. It's a lot of fun." Janet Maslin of The New York Times called it "a lazy but amiable comedy" and praised Murray for achieving "a sardonically exaggerated calm that can be very entertaining".

Gary Arnold, in his review for The Washington Post, wrote, "Stripes squanders at least an hour belaboring situations contradicted from the outset by Murray's personality. The premise and star remain out of whack until the rambling, diffuse screenplay finally struggles beyond basic training." Time wrote, "Stripes will keep potential felons off the streets for two hours. Few people seem to be asking, these days, that movies do more."

== Home media ==
The film was released on DVD on June 7, 2005, a release which includes both the original theatrical cut and an extended cut that runs about 18 minutes longer than the theatrical cut. Extra features include six deleted scenes; audio commentary by Reitman and Goldberg; an hour-long documentary titled "Stars & Stripes" that includes the reminiscences of the screenwriters, Reitman, Diehl, Laroquette, Murray, Reinhold, Soles and Young; and the original trailer.

The extended cut expands on several scenes and includes an excised subplot in which Winger and Ziskey (who takes six hits of Elmo's LSD under the impression that it is Dramamine) go AWOL by stowing away on a special forces paratrooper mission. They become lost in a jungle and are captured by Spanish-speaking guerrillas. They are taken to camp and nearly shot before Winger saves the day by singing the chorus of Tito Rodriguez's "Quando, Quando, Quando", effectively winning over their captors. Winger and Ziskey then leave and rejoin the special forces unit as it is re-boarding the plane. Other deleted scenes include a longer sequence of Winger talking Ziskey into joining the Army with him; Captain Stillman being called out as a liar by Winger when he blames another officer for his neglect in the mortar incident that injured Sgt. Hulka; Hulka giving everyone but John and Russell the weekend off in Italy while assigning them to guard and clean the EM-50, explaining cheerfully that his only reason for doing so is that he doesn't like John; and Russell saying he won't go rescue the platoon because he doesn't want to kill OR die while John warms up to the idea of mounting a rescue via the EM-50. The last two deleted scenes notably have John Winger being told that the platoon members dislike him (indirectly by Hulka, and directly by Russell when he tells John that the platoon hates his guts) which is in contrast to the positive reactions to Winger in the final act of the theatrically released film.

In January 2012, the extended cut of the film was released on Blu-ray.

== Soundtrack ==
The soundtrack for the film was released by Varèse Sarabande on July 19, 2005. The musical score was composed and conducted by Elmer Bernstein, and performed by the Hollywood Studio Symphony. the 40th anniversary edition was released by La-La-Land Records on September 28, 2021. The popular track "The March from Stripes" (or "Stripes March"), composed by Bernstein, is one of the greatest military marches in war film music.

=== 2005 Varèse Sarabande release ===
Original Motion Picture Soundtrack
No.	Title	Length
1.	"Stripes March"	2:20
2.	"Winger"	1:27
3.	"Depression"	0:44
4.	"Push-Ups"	2:13
5.	"Hair Cut"	2:39
6.	"Training"	1:54
7.	"Escape"	1:37
8.	"Cops"	1:26
9.	"Missing"	1:44
10.	"Home"	0:48
11.	"Graduation March"	2:24
12.	"Italy"	1:16
13.	"Gone"	2:28
14.	"Captured"	1:30
15.	"Into the Fire"	2:25
16.	"Rescued"	1:50
17.	"V-J-R"	2:33
18.	"Freeze Frames"	3:32
19.	"End Credits"	1:36
20.	"Stripes Trailer (bonus track)"	2:08
Total length:		39:05

=== 2021 La-La-Land Records 40th anniversary edition release ===
40th Anniversary Motion Picture Score
No.	Title	Length
1.	"Overture (The March from Stripes)"	1:33
2.	"Winger"	1:29
3.	"Depression"	0:43
4.	"Push-Ups"	2:12
5.	"In"	0:28
6.	"The March from Stripes"	2:19
7.	"Haircut"	2:38
8.	"First March"	0:21
9.	"Training"	1:53
10.	"Threat"	0:28
11.	"Escape"	1:40
12.	"Cops"	1:25
13.	"Celebration / Victory"	1:45
14.	"Home / Contact"	2:19
15.	"Graduation March"	2:23
16.	"Italy / Resurrection"	1:18
17.	"EM-50"	0:44
18.	"Gone"	2:27
19.	"Captured"	1:30
20.	"To the Rescue"	1:08
21.	"Into the Fire"	2:55
22.	"Rocket"	0:53
23.	"Rescued"	1:50
24.	"Guard Shack"	0:56
25.	"Moving"	0:30
26.	"V-J-R-"	2:32
27.	"Freeze Frames"	3:48
28.	"End Credits"	2:13
29.	"Stripes Trailer"	2:08
30.	"End Credits (extended version)"	2:49
Total length:		52:12

== Re-release ==
For the 40th anniversary of the film's release, Stripes re-opened in theaters on August 29 to September 2, 2021, with a special introduction from Bill Murray and Ivan Reitman.

== See also ==
- Ghostbusters – A later 1984 comedy film also directed by Reitman, starring Murray and Ramis, and scored by Bernstein
