= Hey, Killer =

Hey Killer

Studio album by Local H
- Released: April 14, 2015
- Studio: Electrical Audio, Chicago and Million Yen, Chicago
- Genre: Alternative rock, grunge
- Length: 46:59
- Label: G&P
- Producer: Andy Gerber

Local H chronology
Local H's Awesome Mix Tape 2 (2014)	Hey Killer (2015)	Live in Europe (2018)

Professional ratings
Review scores
Source	Rating
AllMusic	4/5 stars
Consequence of Sound	C+
Tiny Mix Tapes	4/5 marks

'Hey, Killer' is the eighth studio album by American alternative rock duo Local H, released on April 14, 2015, through G&P Records, the merchandiser for the band. Unlike previous recordings, Hey, Killer is not a conceptual release. The album was released on digital, CD, and vinyl formats. The record marks the first full-length recording to feature Ryan Harding on drums.

Recording for the album was mostly funded by a Pledgemusic campaign started by the band. People who helped donate to the campaign were rewarded with items such as limited edition T-shirts and signed copies of the record. Five percent of the money raised by the campaign was completed was sent to MusiCares, an organization that helps musicians with financial and personal struggles.

== Track listing ==
All tracks are written by Local H.

No.	Title	Length
1.	"The Last Picture Show in Zion"	6:28
2.	"City of Knives"	3:05
3.	"Freshly Fucked"	2:10
4.	"Gig Bag Road"	4:18
5.	"The Misanthrope"	3:23
6.	"One of Us"	4:38
7.	"Leon and the Game of Skin"	6:42
8.	"Mansplainer"	2:57
9.	"Age Group Champion"	4:33
10.	"John the Baptist Blues"	6:03
11.	"I Am a Salt Mine"	2:42

== Personnel ==
Performers

- Scott Lucas - Vocals, guitar
- Ryan Harding - Drums

Production

- Andy Gerber - Production, recording
- Greg Norman - Recording
- Phil Anderson Blythe - Artwork, design
- Stephen Marcussen - Mastering
- Katie Hovland - Photography
- John Oakes - Photography
