= Cardiff Film Festival =

Film festival held in Wales

The Cardiff Film Festival (Gŵyl Ffilm Caerdydd in Welsh) was an annual film festival that took place in Cardiff, Wales. It had previously been called the Cardiff Screen Festival.

== Background ==
Commencing in 1989, it was originally held annually in Aberystwyth as the National film festival for Wales, before being moved to Cardiff due to popularity. The festival offered the chance to meet the directors of many of the films in a more approachable fashion, as the customers and the movie-makers could mingle in a relaxed atmosphere.

The 2005 film festival was held from November 9 to November 19, and was based in Chapter Arts Centre, with extra films being shown in a nearby Cineworld cinema complex. As well as offering films, 2005 saw the festival offer workshops and question and answer sessions with film directors and film producers, as well as talks about how to get into the movie business.

The 2006 festival took place between the 8th and 18 November and would be the last.

The Film Agency for Wales subsequently decided that the festival would be replaced by a new International Film Event for Wales.

== Past winners ==
=== 2006 ===
- Audience Award: Are You Ready for Love?
- International Winner: Shut Up and Shoot Me
- Best Welsh Short: The Outsider
- Best International Short: En Attendant

=== 2005 ===
- Audience Award: Dead Long Enough
- International Winner: The Puffy Chair
- DM Davies Award for short film: Dawn by Shreepali Patel from Cardiff
