= Joe Daniels (drummer) =

American rock drummer

- Born: August 4, 1970 (age 55); Cleveland, Ohio, U.S.
- Genres: Alternative rock; grunge
- Occupations: Drummer; clothing designer
- Instruments: Drums; bass
- Years active: 1987–2007, 2016–present
- Labels: Island

Joseph William Daniels (born August 4, 1970) is an American rock drummer best known as the original drummer for Local H, from 1987 until July 1999.

== Career ==
Daniels and his friends Scott Lucas and Matthew "Matt" Garcia started jamming in 1987, while attending high school in Zion, Illinois. They eventually formed Local H in 1990. When Garcia left the band in 1993, he was not replaced, and the band continued as a duo. To complete the band's sound, Lucas had a high school friend modify his guitar by adding a bass pickup. In 1999, Daniels decided to depart Local H. His last show with the band was at Chicago's The Metro on June 24, 1999.

Daniels then joined the band Stendec in 1999, lasting until they disbanded in 2001. From 2001 to 2004 Daniels was a founding member of The Black Panels. From 2005 to 2007 Daniels worked with the band Bruiser, recording an album with them.

Daniels married in 2006 and had a son the following year. After their son's birth, Daniels and his wife opened a boutique in a Chicago suburb and in 2009, started a children's T-shirt line.

Beginning in April 2016, Daniels toured with Local H to celebrate the 20th anniversary of the album As Good as Dead.

His son is actor Lyon Daniels.

== Discography ==
- Ham Fisted (1995)
- As Good as Dead (1996)
- Pack Up the Cats (1998)
- The '92 Demos (2000)
