= Local H =

American rock band

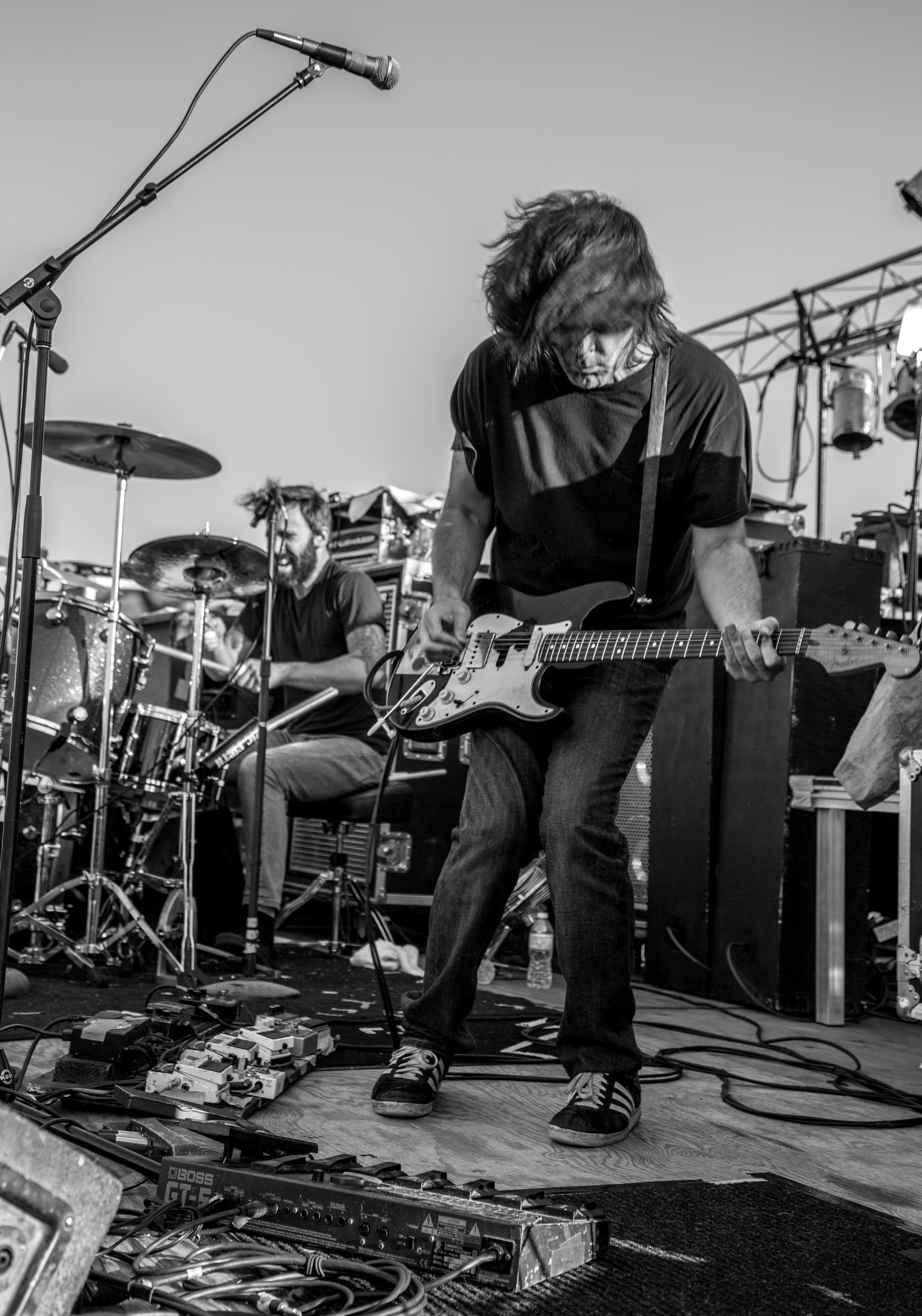
- Local H performing live in 2014

Background information
- Origin: Zion, Illinois, U.S.
- Genres: Alternative rock; grunge; post-grunge; hard rock
- Years active: 1987–present
- Labels: Island; Palm Pictures; Thick; Studio E; Cleopatra; Shout! Factory; Slimstyle; G&P
- Members: Scott Lucas; Ryan Harding
- Past members: Matt Garcia; Tobey Flescher; John Sparkman; Joe Daniels; Brian St. Clair
- Website: LocalH.com

Local H is an American alternative rock band co-founded in 1987 in Zion, Illinois by guitarist and vocalist Scott Lucas, who has remained the band's sole consistent member. Following the departures of the early line-up's bassist and lead guitarist, Lucas and co-founding drummer Joe Daniels continued as an unorthodox two-piece setup.

Local H signed a record contract with Island Records in 1994, where they would go on to release three albums. The band's debut album, Ham Fisted (1995), was not a success and the band was nearly dropped, but the band remained on the label long enough to release their second album, As Good as Dead (1996). The album was a success, selling over 320,000 copies and spawned a radio hit with "Bound for the Floor", which peaked at No. 5 on the US Alternative Billboard Chart and became the band's best known song. Local H's third album, Pack Up the Cats (1998), was a critical success and appeared on several best-of end of year lists, but did not perform as well commercially due to its promotion being negatively affected by a corporate merger involving Island's parent company, PolyGram. The following year, the band left Island, and Daniels was replaced by Brian St. Clair. By March 2002, Local H's first three albums had sold a combined total of 600,000 copies. They have been based in Chicago since 1992.

Local H's first album with St. Clair, Here Comes the Zoo (2002), was released through Palm Pictures. The band recorded three more albums, Whatever Happened to P.J. Soles? (2004), Twelve Angry Months (2008) and Hallelujah! I'm a Bum (2012), and four EPs with St. Clair, prior to his amicable departure in 2013. In November 2013, Ryan Harding was announced as the new drummer, and the band have since released two albums, Hey, Killer in 2015 and Lifers in 2020.

In 2025, Chad Childers of Loudwire included the band in his list of "10 '90s Post-Grunge Bands That Should Have Been Bigger".

== History ==
=== Joe Daniels era (1987–1999) ===
Local H formed as a result of a high school band that Scott Lucas and Matt Garcia were in called Rude Awakening, in 1987. That year, while attending high school in Zion, Scott Lucas and Joe Daniels began jamming together, along with Matt Garcia and John Sparkman. Local H was formed in 1990, performing their first show on April 20, 1990, at the University of Wisconsin in Whitewater. Sparkman left the band on April 4, 1991. Local H released Drum, their first extended play, in 1991. Garcia left on January 26, 1993, and Lucas and Daniels began looking for a replacement bassist. They eventually decided to carry on as a duo with Lucas's friend Tobey Flescher, who modified his guitar to produce lower-pitched sounds in the bass guitar range. Local H played their first show as a duo on September 3, 1993. The name of the band was taken from a combination of two R.E.M. songs, "Oddfellows Local 151” and “Swan Swan H.”

By 1994, record labels were trying to capitalize on the popularity of harder-edged alt-rock bands like Nirvana, Pearl Jam, Soundgarden, and Stone Temple Pilots, and the band caught the attention of Joe Bosso, an A&R rep for Polydor Records, which was then in the process of merging with Island Records. Island released Local H's debut studio album, Ham Fisted, in January 1995, with the singles "Cynic" and "Mayonnaise and Malaise," but the album failed to chart. Behind the scenes, Island pressured Bosso to drop the band; instead, Bosso pushed them into quickly recording a follow-up before Island could cancel their contract. Ahead of the release of As Good as Dead, Lucas was informed by Island that the album needed to sell at least 100,000 copies for the band to remain with the label. As Good as Dead achieved moderate commercial success behind the single "Bound for the Floor", which rose to No. 5 on the US Alternative Billboard Chart and No. 10 on the US Hot Mainstream Rock Billboard Chart. The songs "Eddie Vedder" and "Fritz's Corner" additionally made Top 40 on the Alternative and Mainstream Rock Billboard Charts. The album ultimately sold over 300,000 copies.

Encouraged by the unexpected success of As Good as Dead, Island Records greenlit a third album with Local H's preferred producer, Roy Thomas Baker, along with a larger budget and a promise of no interference. That album, Pack Up the Cats, was a 15-track concept album chronicling the rise and fall of a rock band. Island expected it to be a major success and intended to heavily promote it, with "All the Kids Are Right" as its leadoff single. This plan was derailed, however, when Island Records' parent company, Polygram, was acquired by Universal Music Group. The promotional campaign was canceled and everyone at Island that the band had worked with, including Bosso, were fired or quit. Pack Up The Cats was released September 1, 1998, peaking at number 140 on the Billboard 200 and staying on the chart for only two weeks, despite "All the Kids Are Right" achieving moderate success on MTV. Universal did not release a second single. The album was critically acclaimed and ranked on several best-of year-end lists, and in a retrospective Vulture suggested Pack Up the Cats might have been a landmark album of '90s rock comparable to Nirvana's Nevermind or Radiohead's OK Computer had its release been handled differently.

In July 1999, Daniels left the group.

=== Brian St. Clair era (1999–2013) ===
Intending to continue the band, Lucas hired Triple Fast Action drummer Brian St. Clair, who had previously worked as a drum tech for Cheap Trick. The pair began working on new material for a fourth album, but confidence in the band at Universal was low and the label made them perform showcases for executives, something typically reserved for new bands trying to earn their first contracts. Increasingly disillusioned with being signed to a major label, Lucas submitted new demos to Universal and invited the label to drop the band if they were not onboard, which Universal did.

Local H signed with Palm Pictures to release their fourth album, Here Comes the Zoo, in 2002. The No Fun EP followed in 2003 and their fifth album, Whatever Happened to P.J. Soles?, was released in April 2004 to favorable reviews.

In 2005, the band received a good deal of publicity after recording a cover of the Britney Spears single "Toxic." The track was the only studio recording featured on Alive '05, a 2005 live album that constituted the sixth major release from the band.

In 2008 the band released their sixth studio album, Twelve Angry Months, a concept album in which each of the twelve songs represented a stage in a year-long process of overcoming a failed relationship.

On April 5, 2011, the ICON release of the band's Island recordings became their first "best-of" compilation. In an April 22 interview with The Delaware County Daily Times, Lucas commented, "It's kinda weird but kinda cool because it doesn’t cover our entire career, so I was like, 'Let's call it The Island Years.'"

In a June 28 guest appearance on the movie review podcast/website "CinemaJaw," Lucas claimed that the next album would be out before the upcoming 2012 elections—mainly because so much of the album's content deals with it directly—expecting it to be released by February 2012. In the same interview, Lucas also suggested that a working title for the album was Hallelujah, I'm a Bum, named for a song from the Depression Era. On July 11, 2012, the band announced that their next studio effort, Hallelujah! I'm a Bum, would be released on September 18. A full track listing was also published.

In May 2012, the band launched a tour of small clubs and bars in preparation for release of a new album. In September 2016, Local H announced a North American club tour supporting Helmet.

On August 21, 2013, it was announced that St. Clair would be leaving the band after a brief farewell tour, in order to focus on his tour management company, Tour Time Productions. The departure was described as amicable and a mutual decision between Lucas and St. Clair.

=== Ryan Harding era (2013–present) ===
On November 4, 2013, Ryan Harding was announced as the new drummer. Previously, Harding had played with Sullen (Shanna Kiel from Sullen performed on "5th Ave. Crazy" from Here Comes the Zoo in 2001) and Short & Sweet, who had opened for Local H. Nobody else was auditioned or considered, and Harding's first show with the band was on November 8, 2013. On April 22, 2014 the band released a studio single of their cover of the Lorde song "Team". In early 2015, the duo created a Pledgemusic campaign in order to help fund the production of their new album, titled Hey, Killer. The album was released on April 15, 2015 through G&P Records.

On March 29, 2016, Lucas announced on WKQX that the band would celebrate the 20th anniversary of As Good As Dead by playing shows where they perform the entire AGAD album with original drummer Joe Daniels in addition to other songs with Harding on drums.

In April 2017, Local H was announced as the winner of the 'Hit the Stage' contest, gaining the opportunity to open for Metallica on five dates of the WorldWired Tour.

On January 1, 2018, the band announced a new live album from their 2017 European tour. The album, Live in Europe, was released on February 6, 2018.

On January 6, 2019, the band performed as the halftime entertainment of the Chicago Bears vs. Philadelphia Eagles NFL Wildcard Playoff game.

In January 2020, the band premiered a new single entitled "Turn the Bow", as well as announced an upcoming studio album entitled LIFERS, set to be released in April of the same year. The album was produced by veteran audio engineers Steve Albini and Andy Gerber, features members of Deer Tick and Naked Raygun, and was mixed by J. Robbins. On March 23, 2020, the band released the live video for their single "Hold That Thought." LIFERS was released on April 10, 2020.

On October 22, 2021, the band performed at the Shaky Knees Music Festival.

In 2025, they released a re-recorded version of their debut album Ham Fisted; ReFisted. Following this, drummer Ronnie Dicola filled in for Harding during live performances as well as during The Charmer Tour with Toadies and Sparta in 2026.

== Live shows ==
Local H is known for their frequent and energetic live shows. The members of the band can usually be found at their own merchandise table after shows, signing autographs and selling band T-shirts.

Local H also has a reputation for creative ideas with regards to its live shows. In addition to playing a show in Chicago every New Year's Eve, the band has also participated in several unconventional concerts over the years, such as allowing one fan to select an album name from a hat, and then playing that album in its entirety. On Halloween, Local H plays a set of Nirvana covers while dressed as the band. In 2005, Local H performed an "all request tour" in which a ballot containing a breakdown of most of the bands' songs organized into various categories, resembling a traditional sushi menu, was handed out to the audience upon admittance to the venue. Audiences were allowed to pick seven songs from the "menu" and the setlist for each show was derived from these ballots.

In 2003, the band auctioned off a live show to the winner of an eBay auction. The band subsequently performed this concert at Duke O'Briens, a pub in Crystal Lake, IL.

In July 2007, Local H played an early morning show at U.S. Cellular Field in Chicago at the conclusion of the Nike Rock 'N Run 5K race, where runners ended the race on the field. Tickets to this show were only available by spotting Scott Lucas in public and speaking the phrase "Attention all planets of the Solar Federation, we have assumed control" directly to him. Later that same year, Local H announced a contest in which fans could make videos of themselves covering Local H songs. The winner would then get to be the opening act for Local H's New Year's Eve show later that year. A band from New York called Kung-Fu Grip won the contest with their cover of a song from Local H's No Fun E.P.

During the spring months of 2010, Local H embarked on their "6 Angry Records" Tour. Each show began with Scott holding a hat filled with slips of paper containing the band's album names. After interviewing members of the audience about which album they'd like to hear, one audience member would choose an album from the hat. The band would then play that album on the spot in its entirety, followed by an encore of other Local H favorites and covers.

== Band members ==
Current members

- Scott Lucas – lead vocals, guitar, bass (1987–present)
- Ryan Harding – drums, percussion, backing vocals (2013–present), bass (2016)

Touring members

- Ronnie Dicola – drums, percussion (2025–present)

Former members

- Matt Garcia – bass guitar, vocals (1987–1993)
- Toby (Tobey) Flescher – guitar (1987)
- John Sparkman – lead guitar (1987–1991)
- Joe Daniels – drums, percussion, backing vocals (1987–1999, 2016)
- Brian St. Clair – drums, percussion, backing vocals (1999–2013)

Timeline

== Discography ==
Local H discography
- Studio albums: 9
- EPs: 7
- Live albums: 2
- Music videos: 17

=== Studio albums ===
Title	Details	Peak chart positions			Sales
Title	Details	US	US Heat	US Ind.	Sales
Ham Fisted	Released: January 24, 1995; Label: Island Records; Format: CD, CS, LP	—	—	—	US: 18,885
As Good as Dead	Released: April 16, 1996; Label: Island Records; Format: CD, CS, LP	147	6	—	US: 320,720
Pack Up the Cats	Released: September 1, 1998; Label: Island Records; Format: CD, CS, LP	140	7	—	US: 77,986
Here Comes the Zoo	Released: March 5, 2002; Label: Palm Pictures; Format: CD, CS, LP	—	29	13	US: 19,969
Whatever Happened to P.J. Soles?	Released: April 6, 2004; Label: Studio E; Format: CD	—	—	29	
Twelve Angry Months	Released: May 13, 2008; Label: Shout! Factory; Format: CD	—	18	—	
Hallelujah! I'm A Bum	Released: September 18, 2012; Label: Slimstyle Records; Format: CD, 2LP	—	8	46	
Hey, Killer	Released: April 14, 2015; Label: G&P Records; Format: CD, LP	—	4	22	
LIFERS	Released: April 10, 2020; Label: AntiFragile Music; Format: CD, 2LP, CS	—	—	—	
"—" denotes a recording that did not chart or was not released in that territory.

=== Extended plays ===
Album title	Release details
Drum	Released: 1991; Label: One World Communications; Format: 7"
Half-Life E.P.	Released: 2001; Label: Palm Pictures; Format: CD
The No Fun EP	Released: May 27, 2003; Label: Thick Records; Format: CD
Local H's Awesome Mix Tape #1	Released: October 19, 2010; Label: G&P Records; Format: CD, CS
The Another February EP	Released: February 5, 2013; Label: Slimstyle Records; Format: CD
The Team EP	Released: June 11, 2014; Label: G&P Records; Format: CD
Local H's Awesome Mix Tape #2	Released: December 16, 2014; Label: G&P Records; Format: CD
Local H's Awesome Quarantine Mix Tape #3	Released: October 8, 2021; Label: G&P Records / Brutal Panda Records; Format: CD, LP, CS, 4x7"

=== Live albums ===
Year	Album title	Release details
2005	Alive '05	Released: September 13, 2005; Label: Cleopatra Records; Format: CD
2018	Live in Europe	Released: February 6, 2018; Label: G&P Records; Format: CD, LP

=== Compilation albums ===
Year	Album title	Release details
2005	Retrospective (promotional album)	Released: 2002; Label: Palm Pictures; Format: CD
2011	ICON: The Island Years	Released: April 5, 2011; Label: Island Records; Format: CD

=== Demo releases ===
Year	Album title	Release details
1991	The Scratch Demos	Released: 1991; Label: Self-released; Format: CS
1992	Local H (also released as Is)	Released: 1992; Label: Self-released; Format: CS
1999	The '92 Demos (reissue of Local H demo)	Released: 1999; Label: G&P Records; Format: CD-R
2006	'99-'00 Demos	Released: June 9, 2006; Label: G&P Records; Format: CD
2015	Twenty-Five Years of Skin In the Game (digital download compilation included with the coffee table book of the same name)	Released: December 15, 2015; Label: G&P Records; Format: DL

=== Concert Films ===
Year	Album title	Release details
2010	68 Angry Minutes	Released: February 23, 2010; Label: King of Heart Productions; Format: DVD
2012	There Went the Zoo	Released: March 1, 2012; Label: G&P Records; Format: DVD
2016	Straight Outta Zion	Released: August 16, 2016; Label: G&P Records; Format: Blu-ray

=== Singles ===
Single	Year	Peak chart positions					Album
Single	Year	US Air.	US Main.	US Alt	AUS	CAN Alt.	Album
"Cynic"	1994	—	—	—	—	—	Ham Fisted
"Mayonnaise and Malaise"	1994	—	—	—	—	—	Ham Fisted
"High-Fiving MF"	1996	—	—	—	—	24	As Good as Dead
"Bound for the Floor"	1996	46	10	5	91	15	As Good as Dead
"Eddie Vedder"	1997	—	—	38	—	—	As Good as Dead
"Fritz's Corner"	1997	—	36	—	—	—	As Good as Dead
"All the Kids Are Right"	1998	—	19	20	—	—	Pack Up the Cats
"All-Right (Oh, Yeah)"	1998	—	—	—	—	—	Pack Up the Cats
"Half-Life"	2001	—	40	—	—	—	Here Comes the Zoo
"Hands on the Bible"	2002	—	—	—	—	—	Here Comes the Zoo
"Everyone Alive"	2004	—	—	—	—	—	Whatever Happened to P.J. Soles?
"California Songs"	2004	—	—	—	—	—	Whatever Happened to P.J. Soles?
"Toxic" (Britney Spears cover)	2005	—	—	—	—	—	Alive '05
"24 Hour Break-Up Session"	2008	—	—	—	—	—	Twelve Angry Months
"Machine Shed Wrestling"	2009	—	—	—	—	—	Twelve Angry Months
"Team" (Lorde cover)	2014	—	—	—	—	—	The Team EP
"Patrick Bateman"	2019	—	—	—	—	—	Lifers
"Hold That Thought"	2020	—	—	—	—	—	Lifers
"Beyond the Valley of Snakes"	2020	—	—	—	—		Lifers
"—" denotes a recording that did not chart or was not released in that territory.

=== Split singles ===
Year	Single	Other artist
1994	"Disgruntled Xmas" / "White Christmas"	Sybil Vane
2000	"Birth, School, Work, Death" / "Corporation"	The Blank Theory

=== Music videos ===
Year	Song	Director(s)	Ref.
1995	"Cynic"	Jodi Wille	
1996	"High-Fiving MF"	Jeff Stein	
1996	"Bound for the Floor"	Samuel Bayer	
1997	"Eddie Vedder"	Phil Harder	
1997	"Fritz's Corner"	Phil Harder	
1998	"All the Kids Are Right"	Phil Harder	
2002	"Half-Life"	Phil Harder	
2009	"Machine Shed Wrestling"	Erik Braund & Brandon Hafer	
2012	"Night Flight to Paris"	Scott Lucas	
2012	"Cold Manor"	Scott Lucas	
2013	"Another February"	Jeffrey Clayton Brown	
2018	"Innocents"	Felix Peñeiro	
2019	"Patrick Bateman"	Unknown	
2020	"Hold That Thought"	Unknown	
2020	"Beyond The Valley Of Snakes"	Unknown	
2020	"Sunday Best"	Eoin Stanley	
2021	"Winter Western"	Rachel Lichtman	

=== Compilations and soundtracks ===
- The Great White Hype (1996) – "Feed" (featured in film only)
- Sling Blade Soundtrack (1996) – "Smothered in Hugs" (Guided by Voices)
- Kevin & Bean Present Christmastime In The LBC (1996) – "Disgruntled Christmas"
- Royal Flush: Live On-Air (1997) – "Bound for the Floor" (acoustic)
- Gravesend Soundtrack (1997) – "Have Yourself a Merry Little Christmas" and "Tag-Along"
- 93 One: Unplugged & Burnt Out (1998) – "Bound for the Floor" (acoustic)
- Q101: Local 101 Volume One (1998) – "Talking Smack"
- Q101: Live 101 Volume One (1999) – "All the Kids Are Right" (live)
- Where Is My Mind: A Tribute to the Pixies (1999) – "Tame" (Pixies)
- Thick Records' Oil Compilation (2002) – "Mellowed" (early version)
- Big Nothing (2006) – "Hands on the Bible" and "Bound for the Floor" (both featured in film only)

== See also ==
- List of alternative music artists
