= Brian St. Clair =

American drummer (born 1968)

Brian St. Clair (born May 24, 1968) is an American drummer, best known as a member of the rock duo Local H, from July 1999 until October 2013.

Born in Wooster, Ohio and raised in Fullerton, California, Brian's family moved to the town of Glen Ellyn, Illinois in 1980.

He has played drums for a few Chicago area bands (in order): Eye's On Troy, Political Justice?, Denied Remarks (as a second drummer), God's Acre, My Life With The Thrill Kill Kult, Rights Of The Accused (also known as: ROTA, the entire band sang back up vocals on a 1000 Homo Djs record), and Triple Fast Action. Brian moved to NYC in 1998 after Triple Fast Action broke up.

After Political Justice? broke up St. Clair played with a few bands before landing the role of drummer in one of Chicago's most famous punk bands Rights Of The Accused. In 1988 ROTA were taken on tour with Ministry (band) and became close friends with Al Jourgensen who took them into the studio to sing back up vocals on the 1000 Homo DJs record and put the band in his video for the song Stigmata from the album The Land of Rape and Honey where St. Clair played drums, Herb played bass, Wes played guitar, and Mike jumped around and yelled. However it is very hard to see anyone other than Mike due to all of the fog produced by the fog machine on the set. Also while in ROTA Brian was cast by Cynthia Plaster Caster, one of the Plaster Casters Of Chicago.

Kidd and St. Clair formed Triple Fast Action who released several singles on indie labels and a full CD on Capitol Records and one on Deep Elm records before Brian left the band to pursue other interests. In 1999 St. Clair joined Local H with Scott Lucas.

Just prior to Local H he was the drum tech for Bun E. Carlos of Cheap Trick, and was credited on Cheap Trick's Silver DVD. Brian has been the tour manager for Liz Phair, Brazilian Girls, Micki Free, Triple Fast Action, and Local H. He has also been dubbed one of the "hardest working drummers" in rock history.

St. Clair's hobbies include birdwatching, in which he has seen 550 of the some 810 species in The USA. He was featured in a famous birdwatching book called "Red-Tails in Love" (Random House, 1998) by Marie Winn. In 1998 Brian St. Clair auditioned for the world famous "Blue Man Group" and was told to start taking acting classes so he could join in the future, he took three months of classes at T. Schriber acting school then got too busy with Cheap Trick to continue.

Aside from Local H, St. Clair works for three other bands: Cheap Trick, Brazilian Girls, and Micki Free, where he works behind the scenes in Tour Management and production.

In December 2011 St. Clair signed a drum endorsement deal with Taye Drums.

On August 21, 2013 he announced that he would be departing from Local H after a farewell tour to focus on his tour management company.

2013 - Present: St. Clair has been Cheap Trick's Production Manager. Since 2021 St. Clair added drum tech to his job title with Cheap Trick.

In May 2014 he was diagnosed with prostate cancer. As of April 2015, St. Clair is on indefinite hormonal therapy.
