= Scott Lucas (musician) =

American musician (born 1970)

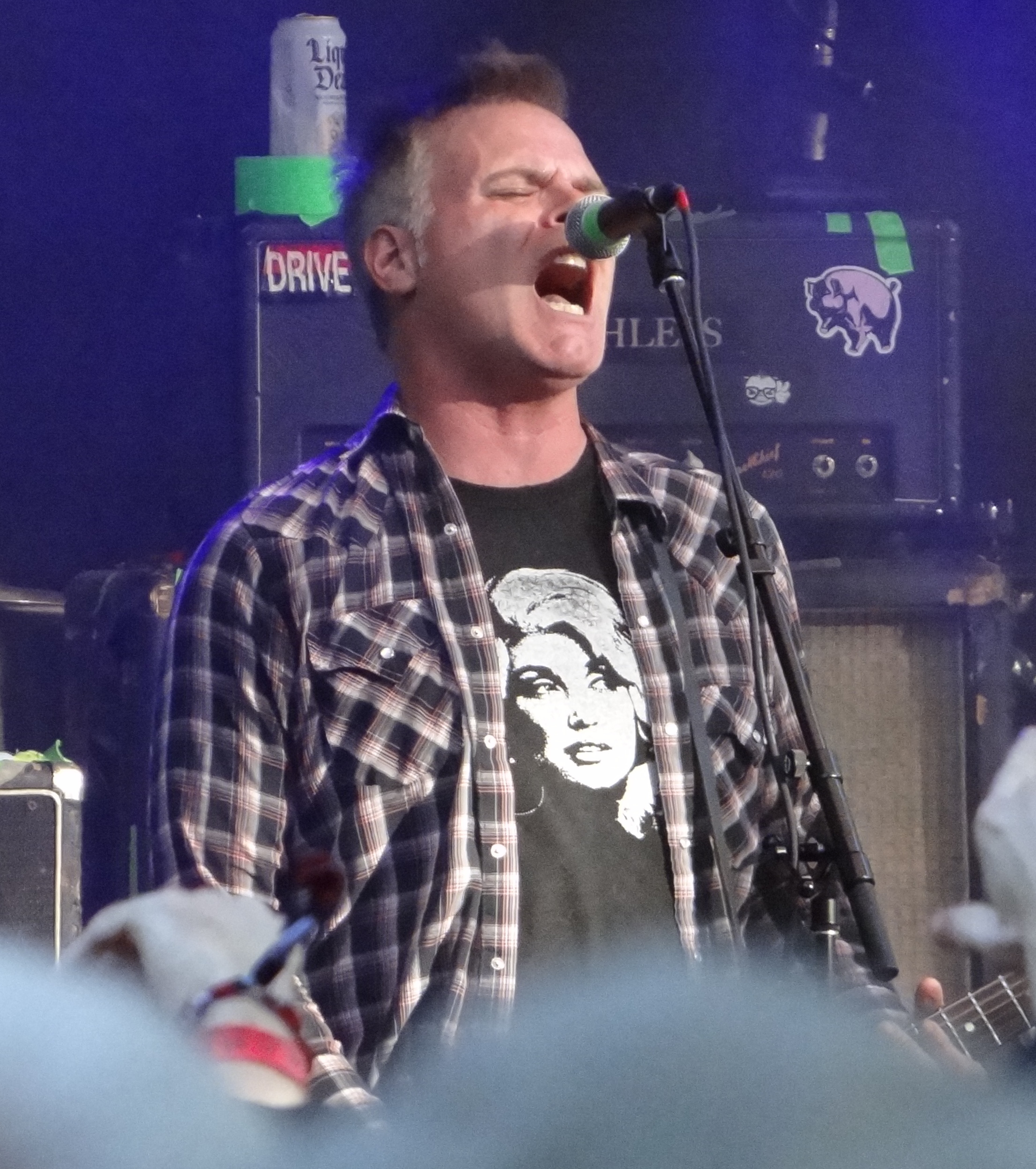
- Lucas in 2021

Background information
- Born: David Scott Lucas; May 10, 1970 (age 55); Chicago, Illinois, United States
- Genres: Alternative rock; grunge; indie rock; punk rock
- Occupations: Musician; singer; songwriter
- Instruments: Guitar; vocals; bass; percussion; keyboards
- Years active: 1987–present
- Labels: Island; Palm Pictures; Thick; Studio E; Cleopatra; Shout! Factory; Slimstyle
- Website: www.localh.com

David Scott Lucas (born May 10, 1970) is an American musician, who is best known for being the guitarist, bassist, and lead vocalist for Local H, as well as the lead vocalist and guitarist of Scott Lucas and the Married Men.

Lucas co-founded Local H in Zion, Illinois, in 1987 with high school friends, bassist Matthew "Matt" Garcia and drummer Joe Daniels, along with lead guitarist John Sparkman. Sparkman left the band in 1991, and Garcia left in 1993, and Lucas added bass pickups to his guitar to compensate; Daniels left the band in July 1999 and was replaced by Brian St. Clair, leaving Lucas as the only remaining original band member. Local H has released several albums, including a covers record in 2010. Lucas is also a member of the electronic band The Prairie Cartel and has released three albums through his solo project, Scott Lucas and the Married Men, which he founded in 2010. He was also in a cover band called The Cold Space, featuring Randy Payne and Tom Szidon from Scott Lucas and the Married Men. He has also performed as a touring bassist for The Tossers, featuring members from Scott Lucas and the Married Men.

In February 2013, Lucas was attacked and robbed after playing a show in Russia. During the attack, Lucas lost his voice and sustained damage to his vocal cords. Lucas quickly regained his voice, but Local H was forced to cancel a string of concerts as a precaution as his vocal cords healed; Lucas has since returned to touring with Local H and Scott Lucas and the Married Men.
