= Aurora Gory Alice =

Studio album by Letters to Cleo
- Released: 1993
- Recorded: 1992–1993
- Genre: Alternative rock
- Length: 38:03
- Label: CherryDisc, Giant
- Producer: Mike Denneen

Letters to Cleo chronology
Aurora Gory Alice (1993)	Wholesale Meats and Fish (1995)

Singles from Aurora Gory Alice
- 1. "Here & Now" Released: 1994

Professional ratings
Review scores
Source	Rating
AllMusic	4/5 stars
Robert Christgau	(dud)
The Encyclopedia of Popular Music	4/5 stars

Aurora Gory Alice is the first studio album by Letters to Cleo. It was released in 1993 on CherryDisc Records and re-released in 1994 on Giant Records. The first single from the album was "I See," which got little exposure (although it was later used as the music that plays during the closing credits of Daria episode "Through a Lens Darkly"). However, the second single, "Here & Now", received much exposure when it was featured on the Melrose Place soundtrack a year later. "Here & Now" peaked at number 56 on the Billboard Hot 100 and number 10 on the Modern Rock Tracks chart.

The re-released version of the album contains different versions of "Rim Shak" and "Here & Now" than the original release. The difference between the two versions was that the second version had Scott Riebling playing bass and Stacy Jones playing drums, while the first release featured Brian Karp, who originally played bass and wrote music for the band. A demo version of "I See" is available on the 1998 compilation release, Sister, with Abe Laboriel, Jr. on drums.

== Critical reception ==
Trouser Press wrote that "the record’s airy sonics, Kay Hanley’s soaring vocals and the band’s smart pop-rock songwriting make for a solid, if not especially challenging, effort."

== Track listing ==
All songs by Letters to Cleo

1. "Big Star" — 4:05
2. "I See" — 3:49
3. "Rim Shak" — 5:21
4. "Wasted" — 4:24
5. "Get on With It" — 4:17
6. "Here & Now" — 3:42
7. "From Under the Dust" — 3:26
8. "Mellie's Comin' Over" — 2:12
9. "Come Around" — 4:11
10. "Step Back" — 2:33

== Chart positions ==
=== Album ===
- 1995 Aurora Gory Alice — Billboard 200 No. 123
- 1995 Aurora Gory Alice — Heatseekers No. 3

=== Singles ===
- 1995 Here & Now — Billboard Hot 100 No. 56
- 1995 Here & Now — Modern Rock Tracks No. 10

== Credits ==
- Chris Gorman — Photography
- Letters to Cleo — Photography
- Mike Denneen — Producer, Mixing
- Henk Kooistra — Mastering
- Michael Eisenstein — Guitar, Keyboards, Backing Vocals
- Kay Hanley — Guitar, Lead Vocals
- Stacy Jones — Drums
- Greg McKenna — Guitar, Backing Vocals
- Scott Riebling — Bass, Backing Vocals
- Antonio Oliart Ros — Mastering
- John Egan — Graphic Design
- Jeff Kellem — Photography
- Rose LeBeau — Photography, cover photo
- Pam Berry — Photography
- Eric Antoniou — Photography
- Brian Karp — Bass
- Abe Laboriel, Jr — Drums on the original Cherry Disc release version of "Here & Now" and "Rim Shak"

== See also ==
- 1993 in music
