= Fight the Frequency =

Studio album by American Hi-Fi
- Released: August 17, 2010
- Recorded: 2007–2008
- Genres: Alternative rock, power pop
- Length: 43:57
- Label: RED Distribution/Hi-Fi Killers
- Producer: American Hi-Fi

American Hi-Fi chronology
Live in Milwaukee (2005)	Fight the Frequency (2010)	Blood & Lemonade (2014)

Professional ratings
Review scores
Source	Rating
Sputnikmusic	3.5/5 stars
Ultimate Guitar	7/10

Fight the Frequency is the fourth studio album by American rock band American Hi-Fi, released on August 17, 2010. Work on the album began in May 2007, when the band first entered the studio to record a follow-up to Hearts on Parade. But due to label issues and band members Stacy Jones and Jamie Arentzen touring as part of Miley Cyrus' backing band, the record's planned release for May 2009 was delayed until 2010. This is the first album to feature original drummer Brian Nolan since their 2003 album The Art of Losing. The album has been produced by the band themselves through their self-made label "Hi-Fi Killers".

== Track listing ==
All tracks are written by Stacy Jones, except 1, 3, 4, 11, and 13 (Jones, Kevin Hunter), and 5 (Jones, Hunter, William Lefler, William Nutter, Gregory Strong).

No.	Title	Length
1.	"Fight the Frequency"	3:57
2.	"This Is a Low"	3:57
3.	"Where Love Is a Lie"	3:51
4.	"Acetate"	3:32
5.	"Lost"	4:03
6.	"Keep It Like a Secret"	3:09
7.	"Frat Clump"	2:13
8.	"Lookout for Hope"	3:18
9.	"A Taste for Crime"	3:09
10.	"Stargazer"	3:42
11.	"Bullet"	3:55
12.	"Tiny Spark"	5:11
Total length:		43:57

iTunes edition bonus track
No.	Title	Length
13.	"Recover the Stars"	4:18
Total length:		48:15

== Personnel ==
American Hi-Fi

- Stacy Jones – lead vocals, rhythm guitar, drums
- Jamie Arentzen – lead guitar, backing vocals
- Drew Parsons – bass, backing vocals
- Brian Nolan – drums, backing vocals

Additional personnel

- Greg Collins – engineer, keyboard, mixing
- Stevie Blacke – strings
- Jessica Catron – cello
- Paul Hager – mixing
- Bill Lefler – engineer
- Dave McNair – mastering
- Miles Wilson – engineer

== Singles ==
"Lost" was the first and only single from the album. The video features the famous British model Keeley Hazell. Stacy Jones said that they did not do the video for the story line, just had fun with it.
