= Go! (Letters to Cleo album) =

Studio album by Letters to Cleo
- Released: October 21, 1997
- Genres: Alternative rock, power pop
- Length: 35:11
- Label: Revolution
- Producer: Peter Collins

Letters to Cleo chronology
Wholesale Meats and Fish (1995)	Go! (1997)	Sister (1998)

Professional ratings
Review scores
Source	Rating
AllMusic	3/5 stars
Entertainment Weekly	C

Go! is the third studio album by the alternative rock band Letters to Cleo. It was released in 1997 on Revolution Records. It was their first album without their original drummer, Stacy Jones, who was replaced by Tom Polce.

The album peaked at No. 45 on Billboard's Top Heatseekers chart.

== Production ==
The album was produced by Peter Collins. It was recorded at Long View Farm, in North Brookfield, Massachusetts. Greg Hawkes played keyboards on "Anchor".

== Critical reception ==
Trouser Press called the album "effective and likable," writing that "Hanley explores the titular theme of dispatching an ex, singing her disillusioned and bitter lyrics ... with conviction and power against loud rock-pop that reaches its apogee in the nearly Breeders-like surge of 'Anchor'." The Orange County Register considered it "nothing special, each song an imitation of standard alternative music this decade without adding anything new to the mix."

== Track listing ==
All songs by Kay Hanley and Letters to Cleo.

1. "I Got Time" – 2:44
2. "Because of You" – 3:02
3. "Anchor" – 3:24
4. "Find You Dead" – 2:52
5. "Veda Very Shining" – 3:30
6. "Co-Pilot" – 3:40
7. "Go!" – 2:15
8. "Sparklegirl" – 3:18
9. "Alouette & Me" – 3:38
10. "I'm a Fool" – 3:16
11. "Disappear" – 3:32

== Personnel ==
- Greg Hawkes - synthesizer, keyboards
- Barry Green - trombone
- Jim Horn - baritone saxophone
- Sam Levine - tenor saxophone
- Steve Patrick - trumpet
- Michael Eisenstein - guitar, keyboards, vocals
- Kay Hanley - vocals, guitar
- Greg McKenna - guitar, vocals
- Scott Riebling - bass, vocals
- Tom Polce - drums, percussion, vocals
- Ellen "Mumma" Hanley - vocals
- Jed Parish - keyboards

== Production ==
- Producer: Peter Collins
- Engineer: Paul David Hager
- Assistant engineer: Jesse Henderson, Craig Nepp, Tom Richards, Ted Paduck
- Mixing: Tom Lord-Alge
- Mastering: Bob Ludwig
- Recording: Paul David Hager
- Loop programming: Anthony J. Resta

== Charts ==
Chart (1997)	Peak position
US Heatseekers Albums (Billboard)	45
Alternative Radio Airplay (CMJ)	39
CMJ Top 200	43
