= American Hi-Fi (album) =

Studio album by American Hi-Fi
- Released: February 27, 2001
- Recorded: 2000
- Studios: Plantation Mixing and Recording
- Genres: Pop-punk; power pop
- Length: 48:48
- Label: Island
- Producer: Bob Rock

American Hi-Fi chronology
American Hi-Fi (2001)	The Art of Losing (2003)

Singles from American Hi-Fi
- 1. "Flavor of the Weak" Released: January 9, 2001; 2. "Another Perfect Day" Released: June 25, 2001

American Hi-Fi is the debut studio album by American rock band American Hi-Fi. It was released on February 27, 2001, by Island Records. Stacy Jones formed American Hi-Fi in 1998; later that year he went to Maui, Hawaii to record drums for Nina Gordon's debut solo album. The rest of American Hi-Fi joined Jones and recorded their debut album with producer Bob Rock at Planation Mixing and Recording. Described as a pop punk and power pop album, American Hi-Fi was compared to Blink-182, Foo Fighters, and Weezer.

"Flavor of the Weak" was released as the lead single in January 2001. Following the release of the album, American Hi-Fi toured with the likes of Eve 6, and Our Lady Peace. "Another Perfect Day" was released as a single later in the year. Music videos were released for both of the songs.

American Hi-Fi received generally favorable reviews from music critics, many of whom praised the band's guitarwork. The album peaked at number 81 on the US Billboard 200, and number 83 in the UK. The album went on to sell over 750,000 copies that year. "Flavor of the Weak" charted on several Billboard radio charts, while "Another Perfect Day" appeared on one.

== Background and production ==
During the 1990s, musician Stacy Jones was a member of acts such as Letters to Cleo, Aimee Mann, and Veruca Salt, all of whom he played drums for. In 2000, Jones taught himself how to play guitar in around a week, and formed BMX Girl in Killington, Vermont. The name was changed to American Hi-Fi at the suggestion of the Rolling Stones member Keith Richards. Jones recruited his friends: Drew Parsons on bass, who had previously played with Tracy Bonham; Jamie Arentzen on guitar, previously of Sky Heroes; and Brian Nolan on drums, former member of Figdish. Jones went to Maui, Hawaii to play drums for former Veruca Salt vocalist Nina Gordon's debut solo album with Bob Rock.

In an attempt to keep the momentum of American Hi-Fi ongoing, the rest of the band was invited to join Jones in Maui. They set up in a garage close to the studio, and began practicing. The band wrote several songs here, and booked a club show in order to improve their performance. Rock took a break from recording Gordon to see the band play. After their show, Rock offered to work on their debut. Recording sessions were held at Planation Mixing and Recording in Maui with Rock producing. Recording was handled by Brian Joseph Dobbs, with second engineer Eric Helmkamp. Mike Gillies did some digital editing. Arentzen said Rock was "one of the reasons it's so huge-sounding. There was never enough stuff on there. [He'd say] 'OK, let's double that, let's put more, more, more,'" In a 2003 interview, Jones said if they played a piece of music that "sounded kind of angular, [Rock] would steer us away from it". Rock mixed all of the recordings, except for "I'm a Fool", which was done by Randy Staub.

== Composition ==
Musically, the sound of American Hi-Fi has been described as pop punk, and power pop, drawing comparisons to Blink-182, Foo Fighters, and Weezer. All of the songs on the album were written by Jones, influenced by the disbandment of Veruca Salt. Stacy's work as a drummer in Veruca Salt was displayed in the rhythm-focused songs on American Hi-Fi.

The opening track "Surround" is an alternative rock song, which was reminiscent of In Color (1977)-era Cheap Trick. "Flavor of the Weak" is about a girl that was mistreated by her partner; it features a guitar solo that recalled the work of Cheap Trick. "A Bigger Mood", as well as "Scar", is driven by Nolan's drum parts and Arentzen's guitarwork, channeling the sound of Sugar. "I'm a Fool" includes Fountains of Wayne-esque vocal harmonies, and is followed by the Nirvana-indebted "Hi-Fi Killer". "Blue Day" includes a homage to the Rolling Stones' track "Sympathy for the Devil" (1968).

== Release ==
On November 26, 2000, American Hi-Fi was announced for release early next year. The following month, American Hi-Fi toured the US east coast with SR-71. "Flavor of the Weak" was released to radio on January 9, 2001. On February 12, the band performed on The Late Late Show with Craig Kilborn. American Hi-Fi was released through Island Records on February 27 of that year. The UK version included the demo "Black Satellite", and the music video for "Flavor of the Weak". For the following two months, American Hi-Fi supported Eve 6 on their headlining US tour.

Following this, the band went on a six-week US tour with Our Lady Peace, and played some shows in Canada. While in Canada, they appeared and performed on MuchMusic and Open Mike with Mike Bullard. In late May, the band performed at the HFStival. In June and July, the band again supported Eve 6, this time as part of the Civic Tour. "Flavor of the Weak" was released as a single in Europe on August 24, 2001; the European version included "Blue Day", a demo of "Vertigo", and an acoustic version of "Flavor of the Weak", while the Australian version featured the "Vertigo" demo, alongside "Scar", and the music video for "Flavor of the Weak". The song's music video is a homage to the film Heavy Metal Parking Lot (1986); the idea for it originated from a party while on tour.

In September and October, the band embarked on the Launch Vibreaker Tour in the US. They played a one-off show in the UK in November with the 45s. "Another Perfect Day" was released to modern rock radio stations on June 25, 2001. The CD version included "Still Sideways", "Wall of Sound", and the demo "Black Satellite" as extra tracks. The song's music video featured Patton Oswalt dressed as a hot dog mascot. The live album Rock n' Roll Noodle Shop: Live from Tokyo, recorded in Japan, was released in May 2002. In 2016, the band released an acoustic version of the album, dubbed American Hi-Fi Acoustic.

== Reception ==
Professional ratings
Review scores
Source	Rating
AllMusic	4/5 stars
Chart Attack	Favorable
Drowned in Sound	2/10
Kerrang!	3/5 stars
Melodic	3.5/5 stars
Ox-Fanzine	Favorable
Rock Hard	7.5/10
Rolling Stone	3/5 stars
The Rolling Stone Album Guide	2/5 stars

American Hi-Fi was met with mainly positive reviews from music critics. AllMusic reviewer Mario Mesquita Borges said American Hi-Fi brought "fresh new strains to the genre on their eponymous debut," sustaining a "high quality standard throughout the whole record." Ox-Fanzine's Elmar Salmutter called the album "a really nice affair", providing "enough guitar broadsides not to drift into the insignificant mainstream". Buffo Schnadelbach of Rock Hard said that in spite of the band's tendencies "poppy vibes and sentimental melodies," their debut "sounds guitar-heavy and powerful enough to fall under the heading of rock." Melodic reviewer Johan Wippsson called the record "modern rock at its best," with "great melodies and ... great production" from Rock.

The staff at Chart Attack wrote that the album "blasts out 13 tracks of shimmering rock 'n' roll bliss that's miles high with distorted hooks". Though they considered it a "bit bubble-gummy at times," it had "such infectious pop sensibilities that it's hard to resist having another listen." Rolling Stone writer Barry Walters wrote that despite the band's "absurd lack of originality ... American Hi-Fi outshine most recent radio-friendly pop-punk, with instantly welcoming songwriting and ferocious instrumental skills". Nathan T. Birk from Ink19 said "Flavour of the Weak" was "dead-on indicative of the band’s self-titled debut," despite it being its "weakest track". He said that while the band seemed unsure of which act they were trying to emulate, they "nonetheless deliver[ed] some soothingly smooth pop-rockers". Terry Bezer of Drowned in Sound held a negative assessment and opened his review by claiming this album is "the sort of shit that makes you feel like pulling a gun on yourself and squeezing the trigger with maximum force."

American Hi-Fi peaked at number 81 on the US Billboard 200, and number 83 in the UK. Throughout 2001, the album would go on to sell over 750,000 copies. "Flavor of the Weak" charted at number 5 on Alternative Airplay, number 15 on Mainstream Top 40, number 35 on Adult Top 40, number 37 on Radio Songs, number 41 on Hot 100, It also reached number 31 in the UK. "Another Perfect Day" reached at number 33 on Alternative Airplay. NME listed the album on a list of nostalgic pop punk records. Cleveland.com ranked "Flavor of the Weak" at number 85 on their list of the top 100 pop-punk songs.

== Track listing ==
All songs written by Stacy Jones.

No.	Title	Length
1.	"Surround"	3:11
2.	"Flavor of the Weak"	3:08
3.	"A Bigger Mood"	3:38
4.	"Safer on the Outside"	4:01
5.	"I'm a Fool"	4:00
6.	"Hi-Fi Killer"	3:05
7.	"Blue Day"	3:33
8.	"My Only Enemy"	3:28
9.	"Don't Wait for the Sun"	3:50
10.	"Another Perfect Day"	3:38
11.	"Scar"	4:03
12.	"What About Today"	3:34
13.	"Wall of Sound"	5:18
Total length:		48:48

UK bonus tracks
No.	Title	Length
14.	"Black Satellite" (demo)	3:10
15.	"Flavor of the Weak" (music video; enhanced content)

== Personnel ==
Personnel per booklet.

American Hi-Fi

- Stacy Jones – vocals, rhythm guitar
- Jamie Arentzen – lead guitar
- Drew Parsons – bass
- Brian Nolan – drums

Production

- Bob Rock – producer, mixing
- Brian Joseph Dobbs – recording
- Eric Helmkamp – second engineer
- Mick Gillies – digital editor
- Randy Staub – mixing (track 5)
- Rick Patrick – creative direction
- Zoren Gold – booklet photography, interior layout
- C. Taylor Crothers – back cover, additional photography
- American Hi-Fi – collage photos

== Charts ==
Chart performance for American Hi-Fi
Chart (2001)	Peak position
UK Albums (Official Charts)	83
US Billboard 200	81
US Heatseekers Albums (Billboard)	1
