= Wholesale Meats and Fish =

Studio album by Letters to Cleo
- Released: August 1, 1995
- Genre: Alternative rock
- Length: 44:41
- Label: Giant
- Producer: Mike Denneen

Letters to Cleo chronology
Aurora Gory Alice (1993)	Wholesale Meats and Fish (1995)	Go! (1997)

Singles from Wholesale Meats and Fish
- 1. "Awake" Released: 1994

Wholesale Meats and Fish is the second album by the alternative rock band Letters to Cleo, released in 1995. The first single was "Awake".

== Critical reception ==
Professional ratings
Review scores
Source	Rating
AllMusic	2.5/5 stars
Entertainment Weekly	B−

Trouser Press wrote that "'Little Rosa', the album's highlight, is '60s-influenced jangle-pop genius."

Entertainment Weekly opined that "too often singer Kay Hanley sounds like a petulant Juliana Hatfield on their soapy, overdramatic love songs."

The New York Times compared the album to its predecessor, calling it "the same alt-rock in a different package". It said that, while Hanley's "bright, clear delivery often lifts Letters to Cleo above college-band status, her happiness can become wearing".

== Track listing ==
All songs by Kay Hanley and Letters to Cleo.

1. "Demon Rock" – 3:24
2. "Fast Way" – 3:59
3. "Jennifer" – 5:10
4. "Awake" – 3:55
5. "Laudanum" – 4:00
6. "Acid Jed" – 3:02
7. "Pizza Cutter" – 4:02
8. "St. Peter" – 4:13
9. "Little Rosa" – 3:07
10. "Do What You Want, Yeah" – 2:51
11. "He's Got an Answer" – 3:49
12. "I Could Sleep (The Wuss Song)" – 3:09

== Chart positions ==
=== Album ===
- 1995 Wholesale Meats and Fish The Billboard 200 No. 188
- 1995 Wholesale Meats and Fish Heatseekers No. 11

=== Singles ===
- 1995 Awake The Billboard Hot 100 No. 88
- 1995 Awake Modern Rock Tracks No. 17
