= Hearts on Parade =

Album by American Hi-Fi

Studio album by American Hi-Fi
- Released: April 12, 2005
- Recorded: 2004
- Studio: Black in Back
- Genre: Alternative rock; power pop; pop-punk
- Length: 38:22
- Label: Maverick
- Producer: Butch Walker, American Hi-Fi

American Hi-Fi chronology
The Art of Losing (2003)	Hearts on Parade (2005)	Live in Milwaukee (2005)

Singles from Hearts on Parade
- 1. "The Geeks Get the Girls" Released: December 2004; 2. "Hell Yeah!" Released: 2005

Alternate Cover
- Japan cover

Hearts on Parade is the third studio album by American rock band American Hi-Fi. It was released on April 12, 2005, through Maverick Records. The album peaked at #129 on the US Billboard 200. Hearts on Parade received a nomination for "Album of the Year" at the Boston Music Awards in 2005.

This was the band's only album to feature Jason Sutter on drums before the 2007 return of original drummer Brian Nolan.

== Production ==
Sessions for Hearts on Parade were held at Black in Back Studios, with Butch Walker and the band co-producing the album. Paul David Hager handled recording; he mixed almost every track at Skip Saylor Recording, with assistant engineer Ian Blanch. "Hell Yeah!" and "Separation Anxiety" were mixed at Conway Recording Studios with assistant engineer Kevin Szymanski. George Marino mastered the album at Sterling Sound in New York City.

== Release ==
Hearts on Parade was released on April 12, 2005. Then went on a US tour, dubbed the Coast to Coast Roast, in June and July 2005 with Reel Big Fish, Punchline and Zolof the Rock & Roll Destroyer. American Hi-Fi dropped off the tour on the around the end of June, as Reel Big Fish frontman Aaron Barrett explains: "they weren't being received very well by the ska kids, and because they were pretty burnt out from being on tour for a year and a half non-stop".

== Reception ==
Professional ratings
Review scores
Source	Rating
AllMusic	2.5/5 stars
Chart Attack	Favorable
IGN	2.8/10
Melodic	3.5/5 stars
Rolling Stone	2/5 stars

The album earned a positive review from critic Ken Capobianco of The Boston Globe. He called it a "fizzy adventure", and he also stated that "almost every track is a Top 40 hit waiting to happen".

== Track listing ==
All lyrics by Stacy Jones, all music by American Hi-Fi.

No.	Title	Length
1.	"Maybe Won't Do"	3:26
2.	"Hell Yeah!"	3:06
3.	"The Geeks Get the Girls"	2:50
4.	"We Can't Be Friends"	3:22
5.	"Something Real"	3:50
6.	"Highs and Lows"	3:17
7.	"The Everlasting Fall"	3:29
8.	"Separation Anxiety"	3:35
9.	"Baby Come Home"	2:51
10.	"Where Did We Go Wrong"	3:06
11.	"Hearts on Parade"	5:24
Total length:		38:22

== Personnel ==
Personnel per booklet.

American Hi-Fi

- Stacy Jones – guitar, lead vocals
- Jamie Arentzen – guitar
- Drew Parsons – bass guitar
- Jason Sutter – drums

Production

- Butch Walker – producer
- American Hi-Fi – producer
- Paul David Hager – recording, mixing
- Ian Blanch – assistant engineer
- Kevin Szymanski – assistant engineer
- George Marino – mastering
- Lyle Owerko – creative direction
- Miki Araki – art direction, design
- Pete White – logo design
- The Flem – cover design
- Mark Owerko – photography
- Jade Loop – cover photo
