= Another Perfect Day (song) =

Single by American Hi-Fi

from the album American Hi-Fi
- Released: 2001
- Genre: Power pop
- Length: 3:40
- Label: Island
- Songwriter: Stacy Jones
- Producer: Bob Rock

American Hi-Fi singles chronology
| "Flavor of the Weak" (2001) | "Another Perfect Day" (2001) | "The Art of Losing" (2003) |

"Another Perfect Day" is the second single from American Hi-Fi's self-titled debut album. The music video for the song features comedian Patton Oswalt. The song was used in NBC's coverage of the 2002 Winter Olympics in Salt Lake City. It peaked at No. 33 on the Billboard Modern Rock Tracks chart.

== Content ==
The song speaks of holding on to a relationship despite all the disappointments it brings. The speaker, who understands that the relationship is falling apart but doesn't want to end it just yet, tries to brush off the negative emotions he/she is experiencing. However, he/she is still incapable of "letting it slide".

== Music video ==
The music video of the song features comedian Patton Oswalt as Carl where he wears a corn dog costume. It was directed by the Malloys. The video starts where the band is seen performing in a warehouse and then Carl is seen waking up after a bad day, goes to get the newspaper but the paperboy throws the newspaper at his face and when he looks at it, the headlining news says that "Corn Dog Hut Fires Carl". With a sad face full of regrets he remembers the days when everyone respects him in the hut. He did commercials for them and was treated as VIP. He got the girls and he seemed to be rich.

But he goes way over headed with things and starts getting drunk at the pool, annoys other people and swim's in the pool in the costume and the security throws him out. He ends up near the garbage where a street dog wakes him up as the dog starts licking his face. He seems more frustrated and goes crazy.

In the ending he sees his postures being replaced and the winery hut guy (in a pizza costume) with his girlfriend sees Carl around their place and they make a laugh at his life and drive away. The video ends but it shows in lines that Carl recently got married and gave birth to a Jumbo Dog. His career had never fully recovered but he was slated to star in an episode of VIP that fall.

== Track listing ==
1. "Another Perfect Day"
2. "Another Perfect Day" (Chris Lord – Alge Mix)
