= The Sheila Divine =

American band

- Origin: Boston, Massachusetts, U.S.
- Genres: Post-punk, indie rock, shoegaze
- Years active: 1997–2003, 2007–2008, 2010–present
- Labels: CherryDisc Records, Roadrunner Records, Arena Rock Recordings, Trash Casual Records
- Members: Aaron Perrino; Steven Lord; Will Claflin; Paul Buckley; Andy Rooney
- Past members: Colin Decker; Shawn Sears; Jim Gilbert; Charles Morton; Ryan Dolan; Brian Charles
- Website: Official Website, Bandcamp

The Sheila Divine is an American, Boston-based rock group. Critics compare their sound to the band's own heroes, mainly the early 1980s post-punk. The band is most often noted for its loud/soft musical dynamic and Aaron Perrino's soaring vocals, screaming in key one moment and howling a falsetto the next. The band has a large die hard fan base in what is often called "the BBBs": Boston, Buffalo, and Belgium.

The band most often explains that they take the name from the Australian term "sheila," which denotes an effeminate man or wimp – thus making them in a literal sense, the sacred wimps. However, there is also, in fact, a real live woman named Sheila Devine, who Aaron, Jim, and Shawn were friends with at Oneonta State University.

== Overview ==
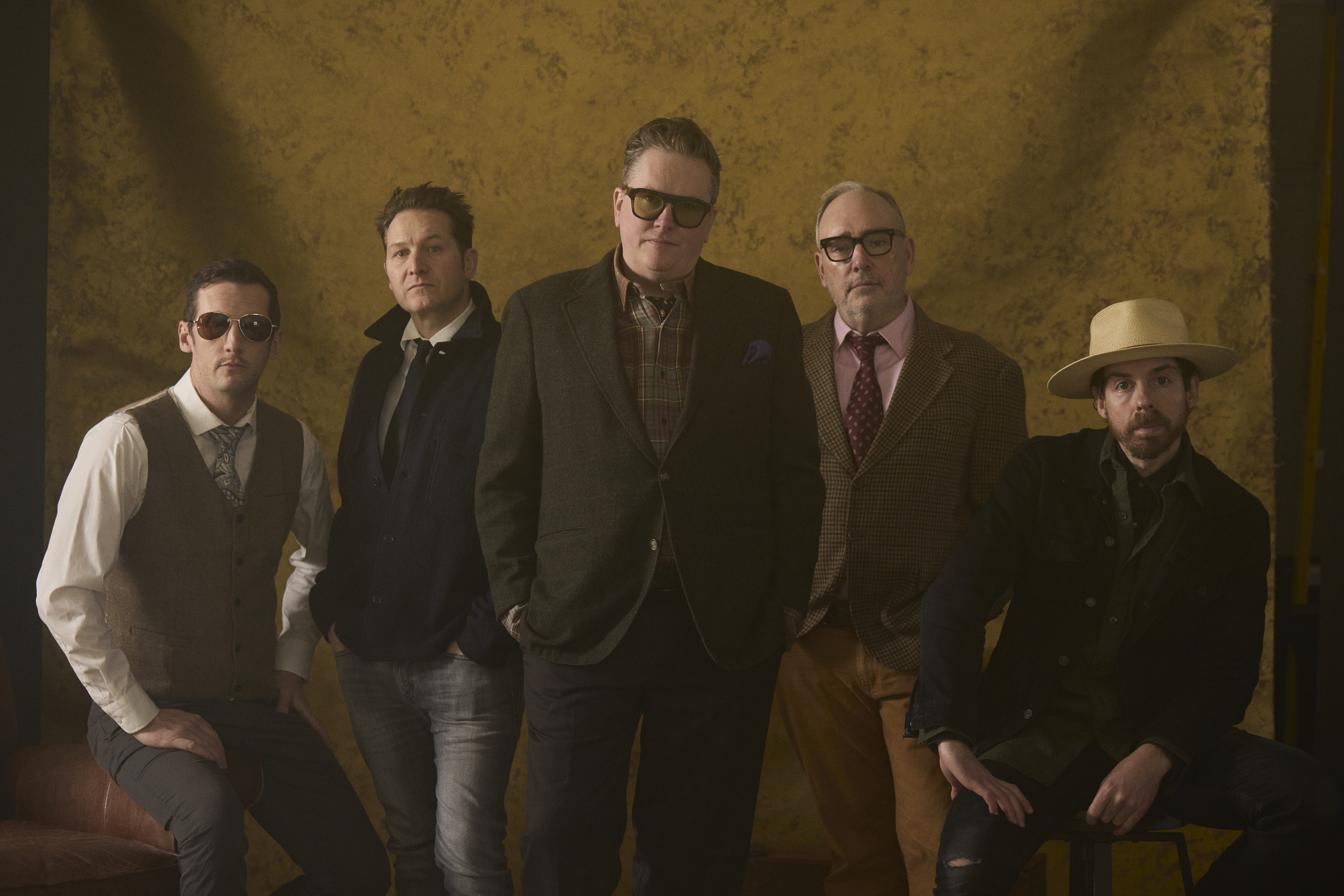
The Sheila Divine 2026

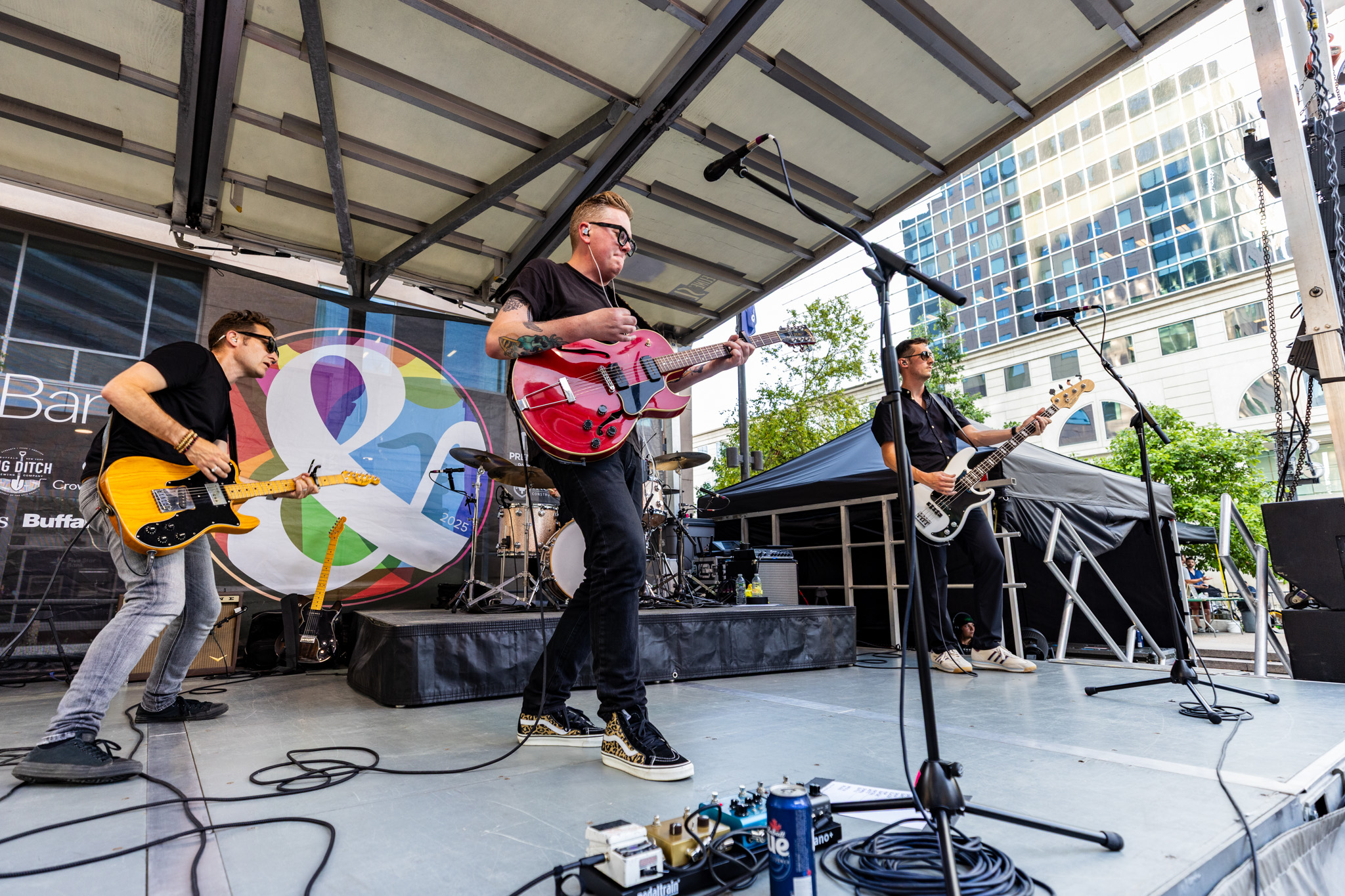
The Sheila Divine perform at Fountain Plaza in Buffalo on July 15, 2025

The Sheila Divine formed in 1997 and played their first show on July 4 at The Middle East in Cambridge, Massachusetts. The lineup consisted of singer, songwriter, guitarist Aaron Perrino, bassist Jim Gilbert, and drummer Shawn Sears. All three had met in college at State University of New York at Oneonta, but each had ended up in Boston independently. They were signed to local indie label CherryDisc Records and released their self-titled five-track EP in 1998. They gained a loyal local following and went on to win the 1999 WBCN Rock & Roll Rumble. CherryDisc Records were bought out by Roadrunner Records, who released The Sheila Divine's first full-length album New Parade in 1999. It received critical praise from local press and spawned the college radio hit Hum. The album featured re-recorded versions of songs that appeared on their first EP, as well as several brand new songs (the Japanese import edition featured two additional songs unavailable on the domestic release, "Secret Rendezvous" and "Weightless," the latter of which had also been released as the b-side to the then-titled "Criminal," the band's only released vinyl 7-inch). By the end of 1999 New Parade received very positive comments in the major press in Belgium, e.g. Knack (magazine). The single Like a criminal reached the radio chart De Afrekening and was included on the compilation album De Afrekening 21.

In late 2000, the band was hard at work on their second album when they added Colin Decker as a second guitarist to broaden their sound. The band released their second album, Where Have My Countrymen Gone, in March 2001 on Co-Op Pop Records. Later that year, in August, Shawn Sears left the band to spend more time with his recently born child. Following a handful of shows with fill-ins Pete Caldes (The Gravel Pit/The Gentlemen) and Paul Buckley (Orbit), drummer Ryan Dolan replaced Sears a month later; Dolan had previously been in the band Lincolnville with guitarist Colin Decker. The Sheila Divine continued to tour constantly and created a large fan base that included both people who would see them across the country and others who would record live shows to share. The band was always generous to bootleggers and allowed video and/or audio taping at all shows.

The band released the six-track EP Secret Society in September 2002 (Arena Rock Recording Co.). They embarked on a non-stop world tour of China, Europe, and then across the United States and back. This rigorous schedule would prove to be the band's undoing. While at a show in Milwaukee, a confrontation with Jim resulted in Aaron throwing his guitar down and announcing that the band was breaking up. Upon returning home, the band stated they would not break up on their website but would instead take time off. Aaron Perrino went on to start recording songs in the studio by himself, which would end up on the War Chords EP, the debut release of his new solo project, Dear Leader. The Sheila Divine officially announced their demise on their website in April 2003 and played two farewell shows in October at The Paradise in Boston, Massachusetts. The sold-out shows were attended by fans who had traveled from as far away as Belgium. The 2nd show was subsequently released as a DVD in 2007 entitled Funeral.

== 2010 Reunion ==
In October 2010, The Sheila Divine regrouped and recorded a new album titled The Things That Once Were. The studio recordings were broadcast to the world via UStream, allowing an interactive experience between the band, studio crew, and fans.

The 2019 album Beginning of The End is Where We'll Start Again again received a rather positive press in Belgium, resulting in a tour through Belgium and the Netherlands.

== No Hope/No Harm, Aaron & the Lord ==
Perrino started two side projects before and after the making of the Beginning of The End is Where We'll Start Again. The first was the emo band No Hope/No Harm in 2017 with Luke O"Neil on vocals, Charles Morton on bass, and Adam Hand on drums and released the singles "Hook and Ladder", Erase Me and the Swimming in the Charles EP in 2018.

When COVID hit in 2020, Perrino retreated to Vermont and started writing an albums worth of songs while sending files to producer Steven Lord (The Dirty Bangs) for what would become his COVID side project, Aaron and the Lord. With his eyes on vocal collaborators, Perrino paired-up Tanya Donelly (of Belly and Throwing Muses) on the tracks "This Love Ain't Dead" and "Heaven or Hyannis." and released 10-song self titled Aaron and the Lord album on Lunch Records in October of 2021.

== The Sheila Divine 4.0 ==
On June 12, 2024, Aaron Perrino posted on Facebook to Friends and Lifelong Supporters,

"I’ve been writing songs since I was 16 years old, and it's always been a defining part of who I am as a person. Whether through The Sheila Divine, Dear Leader, No Hope/No Harm, or Aaron & the Lord, I've never stopped pushing forward, Now, I’m at a pivotal moment in my life, reflecting on my future and what I truly want. Moving forward, The Sheila Divine is the only moniker I will use for all of my music."

== "I Am The Darkness. We Are The Light" ==
On October 31, 2024, as The Sheila Divine, Aaron Perrino released a 9-song album that was written while living in Woodstock, Vermont in 2023. The album titled I Am The Darkness. We Are The Light was recorded and produced by Steven Lord (from Perrino's side project Aaron and the Lord) and featured the singles and videos for the songs, "I Know There is Happiness" and "Satan Got My Soul."

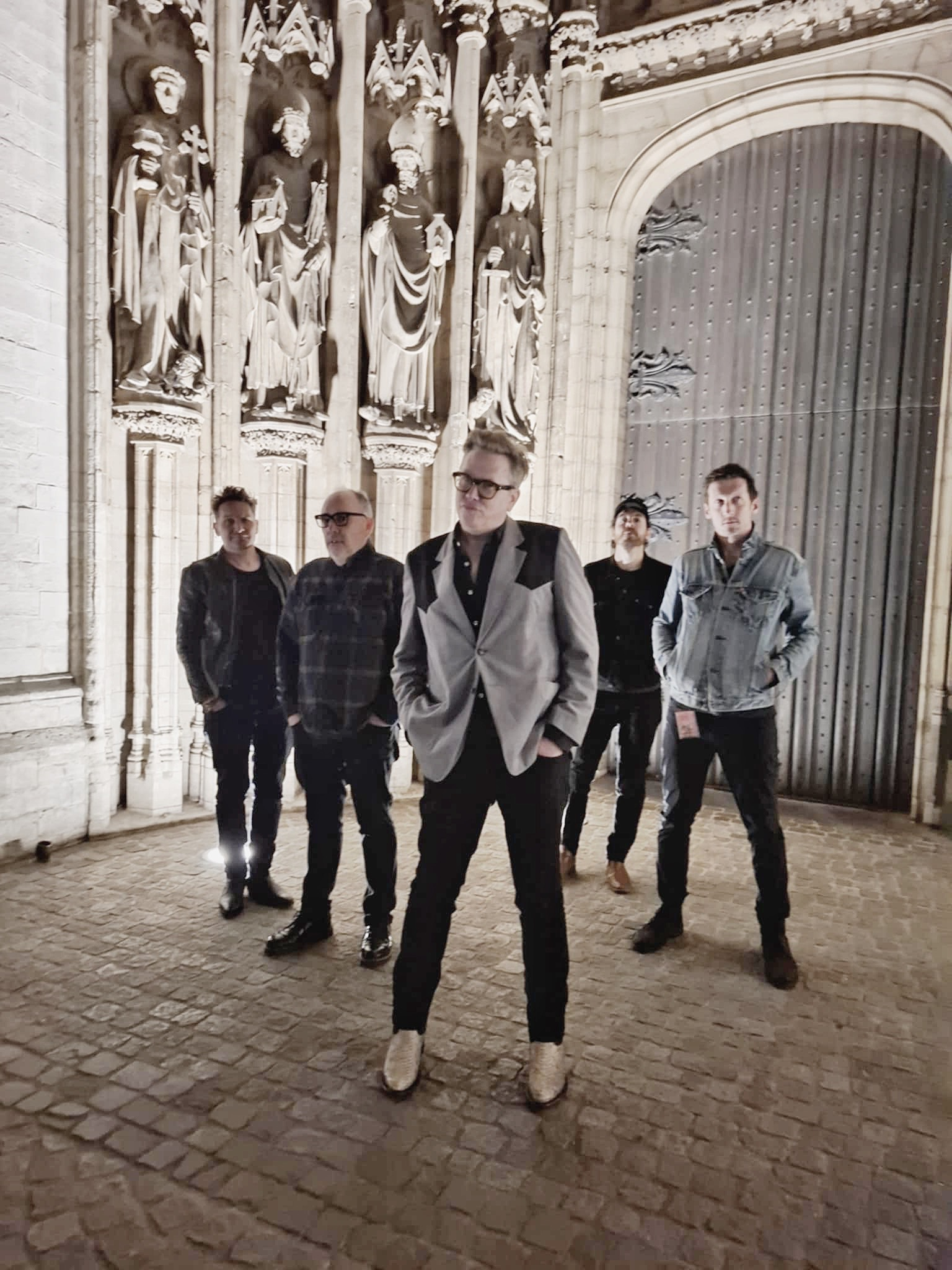
The Sheila Divine in front of the Cathedral of Our Lady (Onze-Lieve-Vrouwekathedraal) in Antwerp, Belgium, May 2025.

== "New Parade" 25th Anniversary Shows ==
The band's official website went live on November 1, 2024 with a list of new shows in Brooklyn, Buffalo, Boston and a spring 2025 6-date tour of Belgium. The tour promoted both the 25th anniversary of the band's debut album "New Parade" along with I Am The Darkness. We Are The Light.

These shows debuted a new line-up consisting of Will Claflin (Dear Leader), Paul Buckley (Orbit, Dear Leader), Steven Lord (The Dirty Bangs, Aaron and the Lord) and former Dropkick Murphys and The Mighty Mighty Bosstones production manager Andy Rooney.

Prior to the Belgium shows, on April 9, 2025, The Sheila Divine released the single "Kim Deal or No Deal" mixed by Paul Kolderie.

== "The Middle Ages" ==
On Feb 25, 2026, The Sheila Divine, released the song and video for "I Climbed Inside a Whale" the first song off the 10-song album The Middle Ages which was released on May 22, 2026 on Trash Casual records. The album was recorded by David Minehan (The Neighborhoods, Buffalo Tom) and Steven Lord, mixed by Wally Gagel (Sebadoh, Cold War Kids, Folk Implosion) and Paul Kolderie (Uncle Tupelo, Hole, Radiohead) and mastered by Pete Weis (Scruffy the Cat, Juliana Hatfield, Belly). The band announced tour dates to support The Middle Ages that include appearances at SXSW '26, Buffalo, Boston, Brussels and Brooklyn.

== Discography ==
=== Albums ===
- New Parade (1999 · Roadrunner Records)
- Where Have My Countrymen Gone (2001 · Co-Op Pop)
- The Things That Once Were (2012 · Independent)
- The Morbs (2015 · Independent)
- Beginning of the End is Where We'll Start Again (2019 · Independent)
- I Am The Darkness. We Are The Light (2024 · Independent)
- The Middle Ages (May 22, 2026 - Trash Casual)

=== EPs ===
- The Sheila Divine EP (1998 · CherryDisc Records)
- Secret Society EP (2002 · Arena Rock Recording Co.)
- Fossils From The Fire (2015 · Independent)

=== Singles ===
- "Like A Criminal" 7" vinyl (1998 · CherryDisc Records)
- "Hum" radio promo CD (1999 · Roadrunner Records)
- "Hum" / "I'm A Believer" cassette promo (1999 · Roadrunner Records)
- "Ostrich" radio promo CD (2001 · Independent)
- "Shakespeare Underground" (2015 · Independent)
- "Watch Out For Us" (2015 · Independent)
- "Time To Set It Off" (2018 · Independent)
- "Melancholy, MA" (2018 · Independent)
- "Age Is Just a Number" (2019 · Independent)
- "I Know There is Happiness" (2024 · Independent)
- "Satan Got My Soul" (2024 · Independent)
- "Kim Deal or No Deal" (2025 · Independent)
- "I Climbed Inside a Whale" (2026 · Trash Casual)

=== Video ===
- Funeral live DVD (2007 · Independent)

=== Compilations ===
- Viva Noel – A Q Division Christmas : "O Holy Night" (1999 · Q Division Records)
- Then Covered Now : "Metal Health (Bang Your Head)" (1999 · Hearbox Records)
- In Our Lifetime: Vol. 3 : "New Landscape" (2002 · Fenway Recordings)
