= Flavor of the Weak =

2000 single by American Hi-Fi

Single by American Hi-Fi

from the album American Hi-Fi
- B-side: "Scar"; "Vertigo" (demo)
- Released: December 22, 2000
- Genre: Pop-punk
- Length: 3:10
- Label: Island
- Songwriter: Stacy Jones
- Producer: Bob Rock

American Hi-Fi singles chronology
"Flavor of the Weak" (2000)	"Another Perfect Day" (2001)

Music video
- "Flavor of the Weak" on YouTube

"Flavor of the Weak" is a song by American rock band American Hi-Fi. The song was released as the first single from their self-titled debut album on December 22, 2000. It is the band's highest-charting single, reaching number 41 on the US Billboard Hot 100 and peaking within the top 50 in Italy, New Zealand, and the United Kingdom.

== Background ==
American Hi-Fi was formed by musician Stacy Jones in 2000, former drummer for cult favorites Letters to Cleo and Veruca Salt. He recruited several close friends in Boston initially to play cover songs. That same year, Jones was invited to participate in recording the Nina Gordon solo album Tonight and the Rest of My Life in Maui, and brought the group along to rehearse. Bob Rock, veteran rock producer, was involved with Gordon's album and lent his services to the band as well after hearing Jones' demos.

The song's title "Flavor of the Weak" is a play on the term "flavor of the week." Jones wrote the song for a female friend whom he felt was being treated poorly by her boyfriend. "My angle wasn't 'she should be with me.' It was, 'Man, these guys are idiots,'" he said. He wrote and sang the song from her perspective, and Rock felt the song had immediate potential. He suggested he sing from his perspective instead, and also contributed the idea for its opening guitar riff. Its genesis was swift: the quartet recorded and completed the song in one evening. Jones took influence for the tune from power pop groups like Teenage Fanclub and Fountains of Wayne, but also older artists like Cheap Trick. In 2016, the band re-recorded the song, along with its 2001 debut album American Hi-Fi, in acoustic form on American Hi-Fi Acoustic.

== Reception ==
The song initially saw success on alternative and modern rock radio, with programmers grouping the new band in with acts like Sum 41 or Good Charlotte. The band's fanbase and perception shifted drastically upon the song's crossover to the top 40 format; alternative stations began to disregard the band as a pop act. "Flavor of the Weak" was among the first of many crossover pop-punk hit singles in the early aughts. The song's huge success was unusual for the band, who had just formed: "We had never even played a real show, and all of a sudden we had a song on the radio," said Jones. Jones also observed the swift backlash from the alternative scene was strange: "The [pop] radio stations would speed the song up and do their own edits. It was really weird. I think it exposed us to a wider audience that we didn't have but it also took away our connection to the rock world." Due to the song's brief popularity, it is considered to have solidified American Hi-Fi's standing as a one-hit wonder.

"Flavor of the Weak" was well-received by music critics. Robbie Daw at Billboard called the tune "a perfect mix of gritty guitars and infectious hooks." Anna Gaca at Spin ranked the song among the best pop-punk choruses of the 21st century. Mike Rampton at Kerrang! dubbed it "one of the all-time top entries [of its kind]."

== Music video ==
The music video for the song, directed by Chris Applebaum, is a parody of the heavy metal documentary Heavy Metal Parking Lot. It takes place in 1986 and begins with a teenage boy, played by drummer Jason Sutter, and his friends cussing about how the heavy metal genre and its artists should be praised while punk rock belongs on Mars. The band American Hi-Fi is jokingly referenced among other metal musicians. The video then begins, flash-forwarding between a story about a girl who acts subservient to her boyfriend, not knowing about his cheating escapades, and the band performing. The video was a staple on MTV and MuchMusic USA video broadcasting playlists.

== Track listings ==
Australian CD single

1. "Flavor of the Weak"
2. "Scar"
3. "Vertigo" (demo)
4. "Flavor of the Weak" (video)

European CD single

1. "Flavor of the Weak"
2. "Flavor of the Weak" (acoustic version)

UK CD single

1. "Flavor of the Weak" (album version) – 3:08
2. "Flavor of the Weak" (mainstream radio) – 2:52
3. "Vertigo" (demo) – 2:11

Japanese CD single

1. "Flavor of the Weak" (album version)
2. "Vertigo" (demo)
3. "Flavor of the Weak" (acoustic version)

== Personnel ==
- Stacy Jones – lead vocals, rhythm guitar, writer
- Jamie Arentzen – lead guitar, backing vocals
- Drew Parsons – bass guitar, backing vocals
- Brian Nolan – drums, percussion, backing vocals
- Bob Rock – producer

== Charts ==
=== Weekly charts ===
Chart (2001)	Peak position
Australia (ARIA)	64
Canada Rock (BDS)	23
Italy (FIMI)	48
Netherlands (Single Top 100)	93
New Zealand (Recorded Music NZ)	46
Scottish Singles Sales (Official Charts)	22
UK Singles (Official Charts)	31
US Billboard Hot 100	41
US Alternative Airplay (Billboard)	5
US Adult Pop Airplay (Billboard)	35
US Pop Airplay (Billboard)	15

=== Year-end charts ===
Chart (2001)	Position
US Adult Top 40 (Billboard)	100
US Mainstream Top 40 (Billboard)	50
US Modern Rock Tracks (Billboard)	23

== Release history ==
Region	Date	Format(s)	Label(s)	Ref.
United States	December 22, 2000	Alternative; college; triple A radio	Island	
United States	February 7, 2001	Top 40 radio	Island	
Australia	May 14, 2001	CD	Island	
Japan	July 18, 2001	CD	Island	
United Kingdom	August 27, 2001	CD; cassette	Mercury	
