= The Art of Losing (song) =

Single by American Hi-Fi

from the album The Art of Losing
- Released: April 14, 2003
- Genre: Pop-punk; emo
- Length: 3:25
- Label: Island
- Songwriter(s): Stacy Jones
- Producer(s): Nick Launay

American Hi-Fi singles chronology
"Another Perfect Day" (2001)	"The Art of Losing" (2003)	"The Breakup Song" (2003)

"The Art of Losing" is the first single from American Hi-Fi's second album The Art of Losing. It has been featured in Freaky Friday, American Wedding, and one episode of Malcolm in the MiddleS4 E13, ‘Stereo Store’. It was also used in trailers for The Perfect Score, Fever Pitch, Hot Rod, Mr. Woodcock, and Speed Racer.

== Track listings ==
US single

1. "The Art of Losing"
2. "Flavor of the Weak" (Live)
3. "When the Breeders Were Big"
4. "The Art of Losing" (Video)

Japan single

1. "The Art of Losing"
2. "Deceiver"
3. "Flavor of the Weak" (Live)

== Content ==
"The song is about being the underdog, but learning to do things your way...People say, ‘Hey, you could do it this way or that way to be more successful.’ But the song is about telling them, ‘I’ll do it my way."

== Music video ==
The video (directed by Chris Applebaum) features American Hi-Fi visiting the house of a fan in Hays, Kansas, where the band is seen performing the song in the living room, with the house surrounded by hundreds of partying locals. The video was deliberately less slick than the normal polished rock production, filmed with normal fans in a normal town in the 'middle of nowhere'. "It was great because we don't think of ourselves as these f---in' rock star dudes. I don't like there to be a line drawn between the band and the fans" said Jones.

== Chart positions ==
Charts	Peak position
Australia (ARIA Hitseekers)	15
UK Singles (OCC)	75
US Billboard Modern Rock Tracks	33
