= The Art of Losing (American Hi-Fi album) =

Studio album by American Hi-Fi
- Released: February 25, 2003
- Recorded: Late 2002
- Studio: Sunset Sound Studio 2, Hollywood, California; Media Vortex, Burbank, California; Sage and Sound, Hollywood, California
- Genre: Pop-punk; power pop; rock
- Length: 36:29
- Label: Island
- Producer: Nick Launay

American Hi-Fi chronology
American Hi-Fi (2001)	The Art of Losing (2003)	Hearts on Parade (2005)

Singles from The Art of Losing
- 1. "The Art of Losing" Released: January 7, 2003; 2. "The Breakup Song" Released: 2003

The Art of Losing is the second studio album by American rock band American Hi-Fi. It was released on February 25, 2003, through Island Records. While touring in support of their eponymous debut studio album (2001), the band wrote new songs on their tour bus. They initially recorded for the album at Sunset Sound Studio 2 in Hollywood, California, with producer Nick Launay, before moving to Media Vortex in Burbank, California, and Sage and Sound, in Hollywood of the state. It has been described as pop-punk, power pop, and rock, while received comparisons to the works of Blink-182 and Sum 41.

The Art of Losing received generally positive reviews from music critics, who commented on the upbeat energy and lack of unoriginal music, while reaching number 80 on the US Billboard 200. Its title track was released to radio as the lead single in January 2003, and peaked at number 33 on the US Alternative Airplay chart. The album was promoted with a club tour, an appearance on Late Show with David Letterman, and music videos for tracks "The Art of Losing", "The Breakup Song" and "Beautiful Disaster".

== Background and production ==
American Hi-Fi released their self-titled debut album in February 2001, and promoted the album with around 300 shows; its lead single "Flavor of the Weak" reached number 41 on the Billboard Hot 100. While on tour, they wrote material on the back of their tour bus. In March 2002, it was reported that the band would start recording shortly with producer Nick Launay, aiming to complete it by April. During the 2002 Warped Tour, American Hi-Fi debuted several new songs, as Jones had written 40 new tracks. Recording sessions were held in late 2002 with Launay; they wanted to retain their live energy while making it. In contrast to Bob Rock, who produced their debut, Launay would encourage material in the vein of the Clash and Pixies.

Basic tracks were recorded with assistance from Kevin Dean and Chris Reynolds at Sunset Sound Studio 2 in Hollywood, California. Overdubs were made with assistance from Dave Alhert and Adam Fuller at Media Vortex in Burbank, California, and it was also provided by Errin Familia at Sage and Sound in Hollywood. Launay mixed the recordings before the album was mastered by Bob Ludwig and Adam Ayan at Gateway Mastering in Portland, Maine. It cost around $200,000 to make; when American Hi-Fi's record label Island Records wanted them to record three more tracks, the cost rose to $300,000.

== Music and lyrics ==
The music of The Art of Losing has been described as pop-punk, power pop, and rock, while it was compared to the works of Blink-182 and Sum 41. The opening title track evokes the sound of the Clash. Jones said the song is about being an underdog and moving on regardless of being told what to do by others. "The Breakup Song" is reminiscent of American Hi-Fi's song "Flavor of the Weak", "First Date" (2001) by Blink-182, and the music of the Police. The lyrics, which included a reference to "Crimson and Clover" (1968) by Tommy James and the Shondells, discuss relationship issues with the narrator placing more focus on retrieving his record collection rather than his ex-girlfriend.

The acoustic song "Save Me", along with "This Is the Sound", recalls the works of Goo Goo Dolls. "Nothing Left to Lose" uses hip hop phrases such as "Holla back y'all" and "All the bitches in the back", and allusions to the Undertones, Jackson Browne, Dennis Rodman and Jackie Chan, as well as cribbing the work of Good Charlotte. It is followed by rock numbers "Teenage Alien Nation" and "Rise". "The Gold Rush", alongside "Happy", recalls the music of Buzzcocks. "Built for Speed" is reminiscent of the music Nirvana; Jones said he took the verse music from "He's a Whore" (1977) by Cheap Trick for it. It is followed by the closing track "Happy", which features guitar licks sampled from "Taxman" (1966) by the Beatles.

== Release and promotion ==
In December 2002, the band filmed the music video for "The Art of Losing" in Hays, Kansas, with their friend Chris Applebaum directing. The video was shot over a period of three days and cost a million dollars to make. It shows American Hi-Fi performing in a fan's house; this was inspired by some fans previously approaching the band after a gig and giving their addresses.

"The Art of Losing" was released to US radio stations as the album's lead single on January 7, 2003. The track marked the start of an initiative from The Island Def Jam Music Group, which made radio singles available as digital downloads to coincide with their radio add-dates. Larry Mattera, the label's vice-president of new media, said it would aid them to gauge audience reactions as soon as people purchased the downloads. The single's German CD version includes "Deceiver", "When the Breeders Were Big", and a live version of "Flavor of the Weak" as extra tracks; the UK CD omits "Deceiver", and includes the other two tracks in addition to the music video for "The Art of Losing".

To build up hype, American Hi-Fi planned to go on European tour with Sum 41. On February 25, 2003, The Art of Losing was released through Island Records. It was initially planned to be titled Beautiful Disaster before being changed to the final title. The cover artwork is a photograph entitled "Self Control" that was taken by Alexandra Klever. The European version of the album includes live versions of "A Bigger Mood" and "Hi-Fi Killer"—both from American Hi-Fi—as bonus tracks, while the Japanese edition includes "When the Breeders Were Big". The former was promoted with a club tour throughout February 2003, with support from Count the Stars and Allister, and an appearance on the Late Show with David Letterman the following month. In April and May of that year, American Hi-Fi were scheduled to support Millencolin on their east coast tour, but the tour was canceled due to the lead act's family issues. Music videos for "The Breakup Song" and "Beautiful Disaster" were later released on YouTube in October 2009.

== Reception ==
Professional ratings
Aggregate scores
Source	Rating
Metacritic	69/100
Review scores
Source	Rating
AllMusic	2.5 /5 stars
Blender	3/5 stars
Cleveland Scene	C
E! Online	B-
Entertainment Weekly	C
IGN	7/10
Melodic	2 /5 stars
Rock Hard	6.5/10
Rolling Stone	2 /5 stars
The Rolling Stone Album Guide	2/5 stars
Spin	7/10

The Art of Losing was met with generally favorable reviews from music critics. At Metacritic, the album received an average score of 69, based on 8 reviews.

The staff of E! Online opened their review by calling the band consistent, adding the listener enters "familiar territory" with a "a batch of arena-ready, metal-friendly [...] that often sounds like Sum 41 doing its best Bay City Rollers impression". IGN writer Jesse Lord said lyricism is "not [American Hi-Fi's] strong point", that the "words resonate with an overwhelming sense of deja vu ... full of cliché and pop culture references". Beside this, Lord said it is a "rather pleasant album to listen to" with "complex musical themes" that separate the band from their peers. Christian Hoard of Spin said "only a snob could hate these 11 songs, which wear their bright, adrenalized grooves, lucid melodies, and arena-ready choruses ... proudly and without a shred of irony". Yahoo! Launch's Ken Micallef said the band made their own brand of "nostalgic power pop that will leave your your vocal cords a mess and your shirt full of someone's else's sweat".

The staff of Rock Hard said The Art of Losing "evoke[s] little emotions", writing: "They are too professional and good to be annoying [...] too calculated and unoriginal to sincerely like". Entertainment Weekly's Craig Seymour wrote American Hi-Fi "return[ed] with a peppy, though derivative, kick of suburban brat rock". Seymour said a few tracks give a "quick sugar-high effect—once they fade, they’re about as fresh as overchewed bubblegum". Cleveland Scene writer Mikael Wood said the album is "full of agreeable sass", though the inclusion of Jones conveys a "total lack of originality". AllMusic reviewer Johnny Loftus said the record is filled mainly with a "jumble of F-words, cheeky pop culture references, name-drops ... and more buzzing 21st century new alternative rock helped out considerably by production chicanery". Kirk Miller of Rolling Stone noted despite the band being two years from the release of "Flavor of the Weak", they were seemingly "still searching for [an] identity". Melodic writer Kaj Roth called it an "OK album" and noted American Hi-Fi as having lost "their own personal style", sounding "just like 36 other bands".

The Art of Losing peaked at number 80 on the US Billboard 200, number 117 in the UK and number 135 in France. "The Art of Losing" reached number 33 on the US Alternative Airplay chart. The album appeared on one of BuzzFeed's "best-of pop punk albums" lists.

== Track listing ==
All songs written by Stacy Jones. All recordings produced by Nick Launay.

The Art of Losing track listing
No.	Title	Length
1.	"The Art of Losing"	3:23
2.	"The Breakup Song"	2:55
3.	"Beautiful Disaster"	2:27
4.	"Save Me"	3:55
5.	"Nothing Left to Lose"	2:57
6.	"Teenage Alien Nation"	3:01
7.	"Rise"	3:11
8.	"This Is the Sound"	4:11
9.	"The Gold Rush"	3:28
10.	"Built for Speed"	2:48
11.	"Happy"	4:04
Total length:		36:29

== Personnel ==
Personnel per booklet.

American Hi-Fi

- Stacy Jones – lead vocals, rhythm guitar
- Jamie Arentzen – lead guitar, backing vocals
- Drew Parsons – bass, backing vocals
- Brian Nolan – drums, backing vocals

Additional musicians

- Lars Fox – virtual sound movement (track 2)

Production

- Nick Launay – producer, recording, mixing
- Kevin Dean – assistant
- Chris Reynolds – assistant
- David Alhert – assistant
- Adam Fuller – assistant
- Errin Familia – assistant
- Bob Ludwig – mastering
- Adam Ayan – mastering
- Louis Marino – art direction, design, children photo
- Colin Lane – photography
- Alexandra Klever – cover photo
- Volker Moehrke – box photo

== Charts ==
Chart performance for The Art of Losing
Chart (2003)	Peak position
French Albums (SNEP)	135
UK Albums (OCC)	117
US Billboard 200	80
