= Sister (Letters to Cleo album) =

Compilation album by Letters to Cleo
- Released: November 3, 1998
- Genre: Alternative rock
- Length: 39:36
- Label: Wicked Disc
- Producer: Rick Griffin, David Porter

Letters to Cleo chronology
Go! (1997)	Sister (1998)	When Did We Do That? (2008)

Professional ratings
Review scores
Source	Rating
Allmusic	3/5 stars

Sister is a compilation album by the band Letters to Cleo. It was released on November 3, 1998. The album's last track is a cover of Fleetwood Mac's "Dreams". The material on the album pre-dates all their other work; tracks 1–7 are originally from their demo tape, tracks 8–10 are rarities previously performed live, and track 11 was on a compilation honoring music of the '70s.

== Track listing ==
All tracks written by Kay Hanley/Greg McKenna except as noted.

1. "I See" – 3:17
2. "Sister" – 3:53
3. "Never Tell" – 3:13
4. "He's Stayin" – 3:03
5. "Clear Blue Water" – 3:55
6. "Pete Beat" – 4:41
7. "Boy" – 2:56
8. "Green Eggs" – 3:48
9. "You Dirty Rat" (Charlie Chesterman) – 3:32
10. "Secret Agent" (Lee Hazlewood) – 2:52
11. "Dreams" (Stevie Nicks) – 4:26

== Personnel ==
- Kay Hanley — vocals, guitar
- Stacy Jones — drums, vocals
- Greg McKenna — lead guitar, vocals
- Scott Riebling — bass, vocals
- Brian Karp — bass
- Mike Eisenstein — rhythm guitar, keyboards, vocals
- Tad Bouvè — guitar
- Pete Whitehead — drums
- Rick Griffin — bass
- Ted Garland — drums (tracks 1–3)

== Production ==
- Producers: Rick Griffin, David Porter
- Engineers: Tim O'Heir, Tom Waltz
- Mixing: Mike Denneen, Tim O'Heir
- Mastering: Henk Kooistra
- Recording technician: Tom Waltz
- Art direction: Alphabet Arm
