= Blood & Lemonade =

Studio album by American Hi-Fi
- Released: September 9, 2014
- Recorded: 2013
- Genre: Pop punk
- Length: 34:20
- Label: Rude
- Producers: American Hi-Fi; John Fields

American Hi-Fi chronology
Fight the Frequency (2010)	Blood & Lemonade (2014)	American Hi-Fi Acoustic (2016)

Singles from Blood & Lemonade
- 1. "Allison" Released: May 8, 2014; 2. "Golden State" Released: December 2, 2014

Professional ratings
Review scores
Source	Rating
AllMusic	3/5 stars
Melodic	3.5/5 stars
Rock Sound	5/10 stars

Blood & Lemonade is the fifth studio album by American rock band American Hi-Fi. It was released on September 9, 2014, through Rude Records. It was released four years after their previous album, Fight the Frequency. The first single released was "Allison", issued in the summer of 2014. The second single is "Golden State".

== Track listing ==
All tracks are written by Stacy Jones, except 1, 3, 5, 8, and 9 (Jones, Kevin Hunter).

No.	Title	Length
1.	"Armageddon Days"	3:41
2.	"Golden State"	3:01
3.	"Coma"	2:50
4.	"Wake Up"	3:18
5.	"Allison"	3:38
6.	"Amnesia"	3:44
7.	"Killing Time"	3:18
8.	"Carry the Sorrow"	2:49
9.	"Portland"	3:39
10.	"No Ordinary Life"	4:22
Total length:		34:20

== Personnel ==
American Hi-Fi

- Stacy Jones – lead vocals, guitar
- Jamie Arentzen – guitar, backing vocals
- Drew Parsons – bass, backing vocals
- Brian Nolan – drums, backing vocals

Production

- John Fields – Engineer
- Craig Frank – Additional Engineer
- Paul David Hager – Mixing
- Howie Weinsberg – Mastering
