= Libido Speedway =

Studio album by Orbit
- Released: February 25, 1997
- Genre: Alternative rock
- Length: 45:34
- Label: A&M Records
- Producer: Ben Grosse, Orbit

Orbit chronology
La Mano (1995)	Libido Speedway (1997)	XLR8R (2001)

Singles from Album
- 1. "Medicine" Released: 1997; 2. "Bicycle Song" Released: 1997

Libido Speedway is an album by Orbit, released in 1997 on A&M Records. It won a Boston Music Award, for the best debut album of 1997.

The album's first single was "Medicine", which was a modern rock radio hit; the band had considered rewriting it after determining that it sounded too much like Pixies. Orbit supported the album by playing the second stage on select 1997 Lollapalooza dates.

== Production ==
The album was produced by Ben Grosse and the band. Many of the songs were written by coming up with the bass line first.

== Critical reception ==
Professional ratings
Review scores
Source	Rating
AllMusic	3/5 stars
Chicago Tribune	2/4 stars
Daily Breeze	3.5/4 stars
San Antonio Express-News	3/4 stars

The Chicago Reader called "Medicine" a "memorable car-radio rocker." The Chicago Tribune thought that "echo tracks and excessive vocal layering clutter an otherwise peppy, involving record."

The Daily Breeze determined that "Orbit has the rare ability to juxtapose a ferocious instrumental attack with buzzing melodies and make it work." The Omaha World-Herald deemed the album "crunchy, stripped-down rock that has a melodic aftertaste."

AllMusic called the album "an entertaining collection of punk-pop and post-grunge power-pop, driven by fizzy melodies and fuzzy guitar riffs."

== Track listing ==
All songs written by Jeff Lowe Robbins, except where stated.

1. "Yeah" – 2:35
2. "Bicycle Song" – 5:33
3. "Wake Up" – 3:50
4. "Amp" – 2:43
5. "Medicine" – 3:56
6. "Rockets" – 4:17 (Buckley / Robbins)
7. "Motorama" – 3:01
8. "Nocturnal Autodrive" – 4:21
9. "Why You Won't" – 3:46 (Brookner / Buckley / Robbins)
10. "Carnival" – 3:25
11. "Chapel Hill" – 1:41 (Brookner / Buckley / Robbins)
12. "Paper Bag" – 4:44 (Buckley / Robbins)
13. "Gazer" – 1:42
14. "Untitled (Hidden Track)" – 3:04

== Credits ==
- Jeff Lowe Robbins – vocals, guitars
- Paul Buckley – drums, vocals
- Produced by Ben Grosse (except "Motorama", produced by Orbit)
- Engineered by Grosse and Gagel (except "Motorama", engineered by Gagel)
- Mixed by Grosse (except "Motorama", mixed by Gagel)
- Mastered by Bob Ludwig
