= Tiny Days =

Studio album by Scruffy the Cat
- Released: 1987
- Recorded: January 1987
- Genre: Roots rock, rock 'n' roll, pop
- Label: Relativity
- Producer: Chris Butler

Scruffy the Cat chronology
High Octane Revival (1986)	Tiny Days (1987)	Boom Boom Boom Bingo (1987)

Tiny Days is the debut album by the American band Scruffy the Cat, released in 1987. The band supported it with a North American tour. "Mybabyshe'sallright", for which a video was shot, was released as a single. Tiny Days was a success on the college radio chart, where it was a top five hit. It sold more than 30,000 copies in its first six months of release.

== Production ==
Recorded in Hoboken, New Jersey, in January 1987, the album was produced by Chris Butler. Scruffy the Cat enjoyed working with him, as they wanted a producer who would help with song structure and show them how to use the studio. All five bandmembers contributed to the songwriting and vocals; they wanted the lyrics to be positive and humorous. Scruffy the Cat's banjo player, Stona Fitch, left the band after the recording sessions. Lead singer Charlie Chesterman considered the style of most of the songs to be "goofy, fun, fast pop". The band used an accordion on "Hello Angel". "Shadow Boy" employs a Bo Diddley beat.

== Critical reception ==
Professional ratings
Review scores
Source	Rating
AllMusic	3/5 stars
Omaha World-Herald	4/5 stars
The Philadelphia Inquirer	4/4 stars

The Washington Post said that the album "demonstrates verve and fervor that few of its rootsy peers can match". The Philadelphia Inquirer opined that "these prickly, rough-hewn rock songs are moody wonders, full of vivid, plainspoken language." Spin panned the "trendy arrangements, the production that mooshes everything into sound-alike sludge, and the lyrics". The Baltimore Sun called the album "sold, no-frills, rock 'n' roll" and praised the "sly twists the lyrics play on pop conventions". The Morning Call concluded that "the song ideas, especially the ones about love, are a mite stale".

AllMusic labeled the band "a New England, clam chowdery version of Jason & the Scorchers or Steve Earle."

== Track listing ==
No.	Title	Length
1.	"Mybabyshe'sallright"
2.	"Shadow Boy"
3.	"Upside Down"
4.	"Time Never Forgets"
5.	"Thomas Doubter"
6.	"Never, Never"
7.	"Hello Angel"
8.	"Momma Killed Hate"
9.	"When Your Ship Comes In"
10.	"My Fate Was Sealed with a Kiss"
11.	"Tiny Days"
