= American Hi-Fi =

American rock band

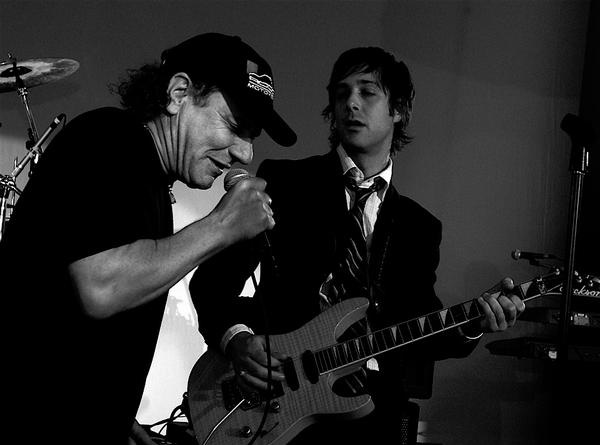
- Lead guitarist Jamie Arentzen (with Brian Johnson from AC/DC)

Background information
- Origin: Boston, Massachusetts, United States
- Genres: Pop-punk; alternative rock; power pop
- Years active: 1998–present
- Labels: Rude; Hi-Fi Killers; RED Distribution; Original Sound; Island; Maverick
- Spinoff of: Letters to Cleo
- Members: Stacy Jones; Jamie Arentzen; Drew Parsons; Brian Nolan
- Past members: Jason Sutter
- Website: americanhi-fi.com

American Hi-Fi is an American rock band formed in Boston, Massachusetts in 1998. The band consists of lead vocalist and rhythm guitarist Stacy Jones, lead guitarist Jamie Arentzen, bassist and backing vocalist Drew Parsons, and drummer Brian Nolan. Prior to the group's formation, Jones was well known for being a drummer in the successful alternative rock bands Veruca Salt and Letters to Cleo. American Hi-Fi has a close relationship with Miley Cyrus, whose band shares two members with American Hi-Fi. The group has a mixed musical style that includes influences from pop-punk, alternative rock, and power pop. Their sound has been categorized as scene music by Alternative Press, which described their sound as "upbeat and hopeful".

The group released its eponymous debut album in 2001, featuring the hit single "Flavor of the Weak”. The band was awarded as the "Rising Star" from the Boston Music Awards in 2001. The Art of Losing followed in 2003 with the singles "The Art of Losing" and "The Breakup Song". After this, the group was dropped from their label, Island Records, and moved to Los Angeles to remake their production and sound. Working with veteran music producer Butch Walker, they released Hearts on Parade in 2005. The band then toured to a widespread fan-base in Japan and in the United States. They then released their first studio album in five years, Fight the Frequency in August 2010. The band released their fifth album Blood & Lemonade on September 9, 2014 worldwide via the independent label Rude Records. Most recently, the band released the Anywhere Else but Here EP on August 7, 2020.

Their song "The Art of Losing" was also featured on the 2003 Freaky Friday soundtrack.

== History ==
=== 1998–2003: Formation, American Hi-Fi and The Art of Losing ===
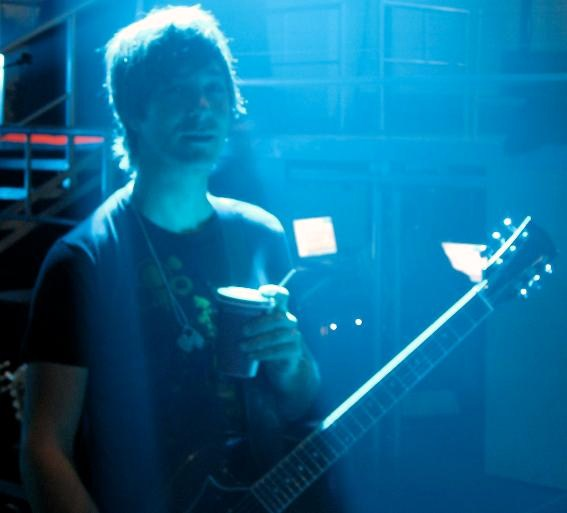
Guitarist Jamie Arentzen, pictured in December 2007

American Hi-Fi initially formed under the name BMX Girl, and Jones changed to a name personally suggested to him by Keith Richards of The Rolling Stones.

American Hi-Fi's released self-titled debut album through Island Records on February 27, 2001 which was produced by Bob Rock. It was an AllMusic 'Album Pick'. Critic Mario Mesquita Borges praised it and stated that "[t]he future of rock & roll is surely guaranteed with acts such as American Hi-Fi." The album reached No. 81 on the Billboard 200 list and No. 1 on the Heatseekers list. The band also achieved a commercial breakthrough through their debut single, "Flavor of the Weak", which ran up the Hot Modern Rock Tracks, the Billboard Hot 100, and other charts followed by Another Perfect Day which peaked 33 in Modern Rock Charts.

In February 2003, the band released their second studio album, The Art of Losing. The album peaked at number eighty on the Billboard 200. The album featured the successful singles "The Art of Losing" and "The Breakup Song." The album was produced by producer Nick Launay, who worked with such artists as Talking Heads, Public Image Ltd. and Silverchair. The Art of Losing failed to reach the success of the band's debut album, leading the band to be dropped by Island Records.

=== 2004–06: Hearts on Parade ===
In early 2004 and without a backing label, the band headed to Los Angeles, to begin work on a new album with producer Butch Walker. The album, Hearts on Parade, was released in Japan on July 14, 2004. Around this time, Nolan had quit the band to focus on being a father, and was replaced by Jason Sutter.

In November 2004, American Hi-Fi were signed by Maverick Records. Maverick helped promote the lead single from Hearts on Parade, "The Geeks Get the Girls", releasing it as a single for radio airplay and following with a music video in February 2005. After repeated delays, Hearts on Parade was released in the United States on April 12, 2005, almost a year after the initial release in Japan. Neither single released with the album broke into the Billboard Modern Rock charts. Maverick dropped the band in the fall of 2005 citing poor record sales.

In the winter of 2005, Playtone Records began seeking submissions for the Superman Returns soundtrack. The band submitted a demo, "The Rescue", which had been recorded for Hearts on Parade but was cut from the album. "The Rescue" was selected for the soundtrack and ran in promotions for the film. "The Rescue" also received frequent radio airplay into the spring of 2006, but did not result in a new record contract for the band.

=== 2007–11: Fight the Frequency ===
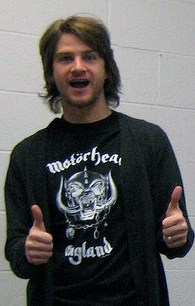
Lead singer Stacy Jones, pictured in December 2007

In December 2006, Parsons and Jones met for plans for a follow-up album, the plans were put on hold due to Jones' busy schedule and Arentzen's plans to join Butch Walker's touring band in Spring 2007.

In April 2007, American Hi-Fi announced that the band would record their fourth record in May 2007. Soon after, former drummer Brian Nolan re-joined the band.

On January 8, 2008, American Hi-Fi released two new tracks on their Myspace page, both unfinished mixes off their upcoming fourth album. "Keep It Like a Secret" was the first track released followed by "A Taste for Crime". Frontman Stacy Jones described the new album as sounding "...a little like Elliott Smith partying with the Foo Fighters at a kegger with My Bloody Valentine and Superdrag". The band also released eight demos, a few of which were recorded live in the studio sans overdubs on their MySpace page including "Fight the Frequency", "Frat Chump", "Acetate", "Bullet", "This Is a Low", "Recover the Stars", "Lost" and "Where Love Is a Lie".

On December 4, 2008, Drew Parsons was interviewed about the band and its upcoming fourth record. Parsons talked about the struggles with their past two labels; Island Records and Maverick Records. He also pointed out that they had signed with Original Sound records and would be releasing a new record in April/May 2009. "The record is complete," says Parsons, "but now it comes down to selecting the songs that will make it on the record". However, later in the year, the band had decided not to go through with plans on Original Sound.

The record was released on August 17, 2010.

According to Stacy Jones in a recent interview, the band created their own record label "Hi-Fi Killers/The Ascot Club" (through Megaforce/RED/Sony) as a means of the band owning their music and to have more input and control for the overall direction and promotion of the band's releases.

In July 2010 the band released a new music video for the new single "Lost" as well as an EP on iTunes containing four songs, "Lost", "This Is a Low", "Where Love Is a Lie" and "A Taste for Crime". As well as a new fully developed website. The album Fight the Frequency was released on August 17, 2010, but had very little touring to support the effort.

=== 2012–15: Blood & Lemonade ===
According to a post on Twitter and Facebook on the band's page, the group announced that they would be recording a new album as a follow-up to Fight the Frequency. The band had signed with Goomba Music for the release. The album is said to be produced by the band and John Fields and recorded at Stacy Jones' studio, The Deathstar.

The recording started around February, vocals done on march and the band stated recording was done. It was now for the mixing given to Paul David Hager. Plans were slowed down as Stacy Jones joined Matchbox Twenty for tour as the drummer. On August 1, the band tweeted that their new album will be coming out soon and posted a new track in their website "Killing Time", followed by a second new track "Wake Up" in September. American Hi-Fi did a one off sold-out show in London on May 7, 2014 and announced their new album will be titled Blood & Lemonade and released on September 9, 2014 via independent label Rude Records with a new single released on iTunes "Allison". On July 15, the band released the second single "Golden State" as an instant grat alongside the album pre-order. On August 19, American Hi-Fi released a music video for their single "Golden State".

The band joined Summerland Tour 2015 with Everclear, Fuel, and Toadies.

=== 2016: American Hi-Fi Acoustic ===
In February 2016, the band announced they were re-recording an acoustic version of their self-titled debut album to be released on Rude Records on April 29, 2016. Stacy Jones said they were initially not interested in the idea, but thought it would be an interesting challenge and recorded it live at Sunset Sounds with minimal overdubs. To go along with the announcement, the band released the music video for "Flavor of the Weak" Acoustic on YouTube.

=== 2020: Anywhere Else but Here EP ===
The band released an EP of cover songs on August 7, 2020 titled Anywhere Else but Here. On October 10th, 2024, the band released their first new song in a decade: "I'm Still In Love With Rock and Roll".

== Band members ==
Current members

- Stacy Jones – lead vocals, rhythm guitar, occasional drums (1998–present)
- Jamie Arentzen – lead guitar, backing vocals (1998–present)
- Drew Parsons – bass, backing vocals (1998–present)
- Brian Nolan – drums, backing vocals (1998–2004, 2007–present)

Former members

- Jason Sutter – drums (2004–2007)

Touring members

- Unknown bassist – bass, backing vocals (2024)
- Lawrence Katz - bass, backing vocals (2026 UK tour)
- Unknown drummer – drums (2024)
- Neal Daniels – drums (2025)

Timeline

== Discography ==
=== Studio albums ===
Title	Album details	Peak chart positions				
Title	Album details	US	FRA	SCO	UK	UK Rock
American Hi-Fi	Released: February 27, 2001; Label: Island	81	—	69	83	12
The Art of Losing	Released: February 25, 2003; Label: Island	80	135	—	117	14
Hearts on Parade	Released: April 12, 2005; Label: Maverick	129	—	—	—	—
Fight the Frequency	Released: August 17, 2010; Label: RED Distribution	—	—	—	—	—
Blood & Lemonade	Released: September 9, 2014; Label: Rude	—	—	—	—	—
American Hi-Fi Acoustic	Released: April 29, 2016; Label: Rude	—	—	—	—	—
"—" denotes a recording that did not chart or was not released in that territory.

=== Live albums ===
Title	Album details
Rock N' Roll Noodle Shop: Live From Tokyo	Released: April 11, 2002; Label: Universal
Live in Milwaukee	Released: April 4, 2005; Label: Maverick

=== Singles ===
Title	Year	Peak chart positions										Album
Title	Year	US	US Alt.	US Pop	AUS	CAN	ITA	NLD	NZ	SCO	UK	Album
"Flavor of the Weak"	2001	41	5	15	64	39	48	93	46	22	31	American Hi-Fi
"Another Perfect Day"	2001	—	33	—	—	—	—	—	—	—	—	American Hi-Fi
"The Art of Losing"	2003	—	33	—	—	—	—	—	—	81	75	The Art of Losing
"The Breakup Song"	2003	—	—	—	—	—	—	—	—	—	—	The Art of Losing
"The Geeks Get the Girls"	2004	—	—	—	—	—	—	—	—	—	—	Hearts on Parade
"Hell Yeah!"	2005	—	—	—	—	—	—	—	—	—	—	Hearts on Parade
"The Rescue"	2006	—	—	—	—	—	—	—	—	—	—	Sound of Superman
"Lost"	2010	—	—	—	—	—	—	—	—	—	—	Fight the Frequency
"Allison"	2014	—	—	—	—	—	—	—	—	—	—	Blood & Lemonade
"—" denotes a release that did not chart.

=== Music videos ===
Title	Date of release	Album	Video Director
"Flavor of the Weak"	2001	American Hi-Fi	Chris Applebaum
"Another Perfect Day"	2001	American Hi-Fi	The Malloys
"The Art of Losing"	2003	The Art of Losing	Chris Applebaum
"The Breakup Song"	2003	The Art of Losing	Brad Stewart
"Beautiful Disaster"	2003	The Art of Losing	
"The Geeks Get The Girls"	2005	Hearts on Parade	Chris Applebaum
"Lost"	2010	Fight the Frequency	Chris Applebaum
"Golden State"	2014	Blood & Lemonade	Ryan Valdez
"Flavor of the Weak Acoustic"	2016	American Hi-Fi Acoustic	
