= Orbit (American band) =

American Alternative Rock band

- Origin: Boston, Massachusetts, U.S.
- Genres: Alternative rock, Indie rock
- Years active: 1994–2001, 2007–2015, 2020–Present
- Labels: A&M, Lunch
- Members: Jeff Robbins; Paul Buckley
- Past members: Fred Archambault; Mark Brookner; Wally Gagel; Linda Bean
- Website: http://www.orbitband.com/

Orbit is an American, Boston, Massachusetts-based rock band. Formed in 1994, the band went on hiatus in late 2001. Their initial releases were on drummer Buckley's own Lunch Records label before the band moved to major label A&M Records in the summer of 1995. The three members of the original trio (Robbins, Buckley, Brookner) signed the deal with A&M.

== Career ==
In 1997, Orbit released their debut album Libido Speedway, which produced the modern rock hit, "Medicine", a spot on the Lollapalooza tour and a Boston Music Award for debut album of the year.

The band completed recording their second major label album, Guide To Better Living in 1998, but it was never released by A&M due to the Polygram-Seagrams merger. The band then moved back to Lunch Records for the remainder of their releases. They also had the song, "XLR8R", included on the soundtrack of the PlayStation 2 game, FreQuency, and the song "Colored Water" in the 1996 Winona Ryder and Lukas Haas film, Boys.

On December 31, 2001, Orbit played their final show before going on hiatus at the Burlington Memorial Auditorium, as part of First Night Celebrations in Burlington, Vermont.

Orbit played two reunion shows on December 28 and 29, 2007, at the Paradise Rock Club in Boston, with Boston indie rock group The Sheila Divine.

In January 2011, A&M released Guide to Better Living re-titled as The Lost Album, which sparked the band to play a series of shows in Boston, Chicago and at SXSW. On June 30, 2012, Orbit performed at the Paradise Rock Club in Boston, as part of a tribute to the closing of Boston Alternative rock radio station WFNX (101.7FM).

On July 23, 2015, Orbit performed as part of the final week of shows before the closing the Cambridge, Massachusetts rock club, TT the Bear's Place.

On October 9, 2020, Orbit released the album Vapor Trails - a collection of unreleased recordings on Lunch Records.

On August 24, 2023, the band announced its first live show in over eight years on its official Facebook page with reunion show at the Brighton Music Hall with The Sheila Divine on November 22, 2023.

== Members ==
- Jeff Lowe Robbins, lead singer and guitarist
- Paul Buckley, drummer
- Mark Brookner, bassist (1994–1995)
- Linda Bean, bassist (1999–2001)
- Fred Archambault, guitarist (2000-2001)

Original band members Jeff Robbins and Paul Buckley were the only constant band members during Orbit's active years. Fred Archambault and Linda Bean joined before the release of Tonedeaf. Since the band went on hiatus, Robbins and Bean formed the band WELL and Paul Buckley drums for Dear Leader, and runs independent record label, Lunch Records.

== Discography ==
=== Studio albums ===
- Libido Speedway (1997, A&M Records)
- Guide to Better Living (1999, A&M Records) not released until 2011, under the title The Lost Album (2011, A&M Records)
- XLR8R (2001, Lunch Records)
- Vapor Trails (2020, Lunch Records)

=== EPs ===
- La Mano (1995, Lunch Records)
- Medicine (1997, A&M Records)
- I Wanna Make You (1998, Lunch Records)
- Tonedeaf (2000, Lunch Records)

=== Singles ===
- "Motorama" (1994)
- "Purge" (1995)
- "Come Inside" (1996)
- "Medicine" (1997) #29 Mainstream Rock Tracks, #32 Modern Rock Tracks (Billboard)
- "Bicycle Song" (1997)
- "Fade Away" (2000)
- "See The Light" (2020)
- "More I Bother" (2020)
- "One In Your Eyes" (Coming July 30, 2021)

=== Videos ===
- "Come Inside" (1995) Directed by Spencer Tunick
- "Medicine" (1997) Directed by Gavin Bowdin
- "I Wanna Make You" (1999) Directed by Mike Gioscia and Kurt St. Thomas
