= Generation O! =

- Genre: Animated; Children's show; Musical
- Created by: David Hale; Tim Newman; James Proimos; Suzanne Collins
- Directed by: Mike Milo
- Voices of: Chantal Strand; Kay Hanley; Scott McNeil; Tabitha St. Germain; Kathleen Barr; Cathy Weseluck; Matt Hill; Doug Parker; Andrew Francis
- Theme music composer: Kay Hanley; Michael Eisenstein
- Opening theme: "Generation O!" performed by Letters to Cleo
- Composers: Kay Hanley (songs); Michael Eisenstein (songs); Michael Carey (score)
- Country of origin: United States
- Original language: English
- No. of seasons: 1
- No. of episodes: 13

Production
- Executive producers: Wolfgang Heidrich; Ken Olshansky; Carole Wietzman
- Producer: Jodey Kaminski-Cashman
- Running time: 30 minutes
- Production companies: Sunbow Entertainment; RTV Family Entertainment; Cuckoo's Nest Studio; Sony Wonder

Original release
- Network: Kids' WB
- Release: August 26, 2000 – March 23, 2001

Generation O! is an American animated musical children's television series made by Sony Wonder and Sunbow Entertainment, with co-production associated by Cuckoo's Nest Studio in Taiwan and Ravensburger in Germany. The show was originally titled Molly O!, and was released under that title in some regions. It was created by David Hale, Tim Newman and James Proimos with Suzanne Collins, based on an original idea by Hale and Newman. Executive producers were Wolfgang Heidrich, Ken Olshansky and Carole Weitzman. The creative producer and director was Mike Milo and the producer was Jodey Kaminsky-Cashman. The story editor was Collins, who later wrote The Hunger Games book series. John Hardman was the production executive at Kids' WB.

The show's visual design was based on Proimos' style. Every episode had at least one song and music video, which would be related to the episode's plot. Most of the songs used in the series were written and performed by Hale and Michael Eisenstein of Letters to Cleo.

This show aired from 2000 to 2001 on YTV and Kids' WB. Kids' WB aired it as part of their "Fraturdays" block. 13 episodes were produced. In Latin America, the show premiered on Nickelodeon on 2001, but was removed in early 2003. In the UK, the series was screened on the Disney Channel, but unlisted in the schedules and aired in a late night slot and Toon Disney. In Australia it aired on Nickelodeon. In Ireland, it was screened on the Irish language network TG4 with the series dubbed into Irish. In Singapore, the series was broadcast on Kids Central.

== Plot ==
Generation O! focuses on the character of Molly O, an 8-year-old rock star and the lead singer of the band "Generation O!" along with bassist Nub (an older British musician), guitarist Eddie (Molly's cousin), drummer Yo-Yo (a kangaroo), and manager Colonel Bob. Molly also spends time with her best friend Chadd, and tries to avoid her pesky brother Buzz.

== Music ==
Each episode of Generation O! featured an original song performed by alternative rock band Letters to Cleo, for a total of 13 songs. There was also an extra song used specifically for promotion of the show. While these songs were written by the show's writers, Letters to Cleo did write the show's opening theme. In total, 15 songs were performed by the group.

== Crew ==
- Jodey Cashman – Line Producer
- Anthony Mathews – Production Manager
- Mike Milo – Creative Producer and Director
- Tom McLaughlin – Sheet timing
- Trevor Wall – Storyboard supervisor
- Tim Harding – props
- Phip Dimetriadis – backgrounds
- Becca Ramos – Additional backgrounds
- Mike Inman – background color
- Mike Guerena – character color
- Brent Gordon and Mike Milo – character design and models
- Glen Darcey – F/X & other drawings

Post-production was provided by Vitello Post in Hollywood

== Cast ==
Voice actors for Generation O!:

- Chantal Strand as Molly O
  - Kay Hanley as Molly O (singing voice)
- Tabitha St. Germain as Eddie
- Scott McNeil as Nub
- Jay Brazeau as Col. Bob
- Kathleen Barr as Mrs. O
- Doug Parker as Mr. O
- Matt Hill as Buzz
- Cathy Weseluck as Chadd
- Andrew Francis as Kemp
- Brian Dobson as Additional voices
- Cathy Weseluck as Additional voices
- Chiara Zanni as Additional voices
- Nicole Oliver as Additional voices
- Saffron Henderson as Additional voices

== Episodes ==
No.	Title	Written by	Original release date
1	"Damp Sheets"	Suzanne Collins	August 26, 2000
Molly wets her bed, and a crooked senator uses it as blackmail fodder.
2	"Our House"	Alan Goodman	September 2, 2000
To prepare for their next concert, Generation O stays in an old house, which proves to be problematic when they get on each others' nerves.
3	"You Copied"	Alan Goodman	September 9, 2000
Molly is accused of plagiarizing a song from another band, the Dancing Schuberts. Now, Molly has to appear in court, but even she starts to think she copied.
4	"Deviated Tonsils"	Suzanne Collins	September 16, 2000
Molly's tonsils need to be removed, but she insists on keeping her tonsils.
5	"Pierced Ears"	Suzanne Collins	September 22, 2000
Molly wants her ears pierced, but she struggles to prove that she's mature enough to handle to responsibility. Nub, Mr. O, and Yo-Yo try to recreate a delicious pizza.
6	"Girls Rule, Boys Drool"	Peter Mattei	September 29, 2000
Molly gets angry at her brother, so she and Eddie create the song "Girls Rule, Boys Drool." Seeking revenge, Buzz leaks it behind her back, damaging Molly and Chadd's friendship.
7	"Boys May Be Boys"	Peter Bakalian	October 13, 2000
Molly pretends to be a boy so that she can enter a monster truck rally. However, she causes one of the monster trucks to crash into a building, and she blames it on Buzz, causing her to feel guilty.
8	"Look Alike"	Suzanne Collins	November 3, 2000
Buzz orchestrates a Molly O! look-alike contest.
9	"Bedtime Blues"	Robin Riordan	November 10, 2000
Molly tries to sneak out of the house to see her favorite comedian.
10	"Going Solo"	Suzanne Collins	December 1, 2000
Winning an award pressures Nub into leaving Molly O!'s band.
11	"Lone Fry"	Michael Dawson	February 2, 2001
Ironically, Molly is the outcast in her school's winter pageant.
12	"Whatever Happened to Molly O!?"	Ken Segall	February 23, 2001
After a day at Buckingham Palace, everyone thinks the real Molly O has been replaced by a man named Melvin.
13	"Buzz's Room"	Peter Bakalian	March 23, 2001
After writing a song about Buzz's room, Molly realizes the best person to direct the music video is Buzz.

== Home media release ==
A few episodes were released on VHS in 2001 by Sony Wonder. The series has never been released on DVD.
