= Cherry Marmalade =

Studio album by Kay Hanley
- Released: August 13, 2002
- Genre: Alternative rock
- Length: 53:47
- Label: Zoë
- Producer: Mike Denneen

Cherry Marmalade is the first solo album by Kay Hanley, released in 2002 (see 2002 in music).

== Critical reception ==
Linda Laban of the Boston Herald considered "Cherry Marmalade" one of the top ten CDs released in 2002. Laban described it as "sexy, clever, catchy pop".

John Wirt of The Advocate said, "Hanley's versatile voice runs from reedy and tough to airy and vulnerable. Her singing's fully exploited through multi-tracking. Hanley's music and lyrics, either written by her alone or with Eisenstein, are as fetching and varied as anything Letters to Cleo did."" Wirt described "Cherry Marmalade" as "one of the more pleasing pop-rock CDs of 2002.

Craig S. Simon of the Worcester Telegram and Gazette described "Cherry Marmalade" a "joyous collection of the kind of smart and spunky pop tunes that seem to be few and far between these days."

Chuck Campbell of the Knoxville News Sentinel said the album "often sounds like it's lacking a focal point" and "that Hanley struggles for a sense of purpose as she works her way through the enervating muddiness".

Elysa Gardner of USA Today called Cherry Marmalade, "insubstantial and bland".

After "Cherry Marmalade" did not make a large commercial impact, Hanley said, "I have to remind people all the time (especially my mom) that my goal is not to reach a mass audience but to consistently put out my own version of good pop music to as many, or few, people who want to hear it. Letters to Cleo never made massively popular records, and I probably never will either, but I'll always make music, so if you want to hear it, I'll keep making it."

== Track listing ==
1. "Fall" (Hanley) – 4:57
2. "This Dreadful Life" (Eisenstein, Hanley) – 4:32
3. "Satellite" (Hanley) – 4:19
4. "Chady Saves the Day" (Eisenstein, Hanley) – 4:06
5. "Sheltering Sky" (Eisenstein, Hanley) – 4:34
6. "Princely Ghetto" (Eisenstein, Hanley) – 4:27
7. "Made in the Shade" (Eisenstein, Hanley) – 4:48
8. "Faded Dress" (Hanley) – 5:11
9. "Happy to Be Here" (Hanley) – 2:38
10. "Galapagos" (Hanley) – 6:25
11. "Mean Streak" (Eisenstein, Hanley) – 2:50
12. "Trans-Neptunian Object #1" (Hanley) – 5:00

== Personnel ==
- Kay Hanley – vocals, guitar
- Peter Adams – keyboards
- Paul Buckley – drums
- Michael Eisenstein – guitar
- Tim Obetz – pedal steel
- Carl Plaster – drums
- Steve Scully – percussion, brushes
- Jennifer Trynin – guitar
- Ed Valauskas – bass

== Production ==
- Producer: Mike Denneen
- Engineer: Mike Denneen
- Assistant engineer: Fred Archambault
- Mastering: Greg Calbi
- Mixing: Tom Polce, Scott Riebling
