= CherryDisc Records =

US record label

CherryDisc Records was a Boston-based independent record label in the mid- to late-1990s. It gained notoriety by moving acts such as Letters to Cleo, Big Catholic Guilt, Smackmelon, Tracy Bonham, The Sheila Divine, Quintaine Americana, and Semisonic on to major labels.

Cherrydisc was founded in 1991 by entrepreneur John Horton and Fritz Johnson. Fritz left early on and John Horton was soon joined by friend and audiophile Graham Wilson. The local Boston music zine The Pit Report was originally affiliated with the label but soon split off to become its own entity. Between 1993 and 1996 the label grew to include 5–6 full-time employees, two contract graphic designers, and several rotating interns. They were the recipient of the 1993 Best of Boston award for the compilation album Crush and achieved nationwide indie-label recognition due to the quality of some of their signed artists as well as for their broad and successful product distribution through Sony's independent arm, R.E.D. The label functioned with varying degrees of success and peaked financially with the success of Letters to Cleo in 1995. The label then went through a growth stage and managed the growth with cash injections from major labels (for both moving acts on to major labels but also releasing and promoting initial albums of less-established major label acts) and international licensing deals.

In 1992, CherryDisc released the cult favorite Meat The Stools, under their CherryStem Division, a division specifically created to handle The Stools music to help distance the label from the band.

In late 1997, Cherrydisc relocated to a loft in Boston's Leather District and became notorious locally for their large in-house event parties for record-releases. Late artists signed to the label include Trona and The Sheila Divine.

In 1997 Cherrydisc signed an international distribution and artist development deal with Roadrunner Records of New York. Cherrydisc was tasked with developing an Alternative Artist roster. Under the terms of the deal, Cherrydisc was to be financed handsomely and would be supported by Roadrunner's Publicity and Marketing departments. Soon after the contract was signed, a shake-up in Roadrunner's leadership left Cherrydisc without financial support. Roadrunner paid Cherrydisc only 25% of the contracted advances, leaving the label cash poor and unable to promote its new releases, or hire the necessary staff to operate the label. Horton lost his battle with Roadrunner's incoming president, which left the label in financial ruin. Cherrydisc closed in 1998.

In 2003 Horton launched children's music label Light Of The Moon Entertainment with the help of former CherryDisc employee Arun Seth. The label released Kizooks - Super Huge Very big Hits through a deal with New York-based Koch Records. The CD was distributed to all major US retail outlets including WalMart and Kmart. In 2007, songs from Kizooks continue to be in the top 20 downloads on iTunes children's music chart.

== See also ==
- List of record labels
