= Jeff Robbins =

American musician and web developer

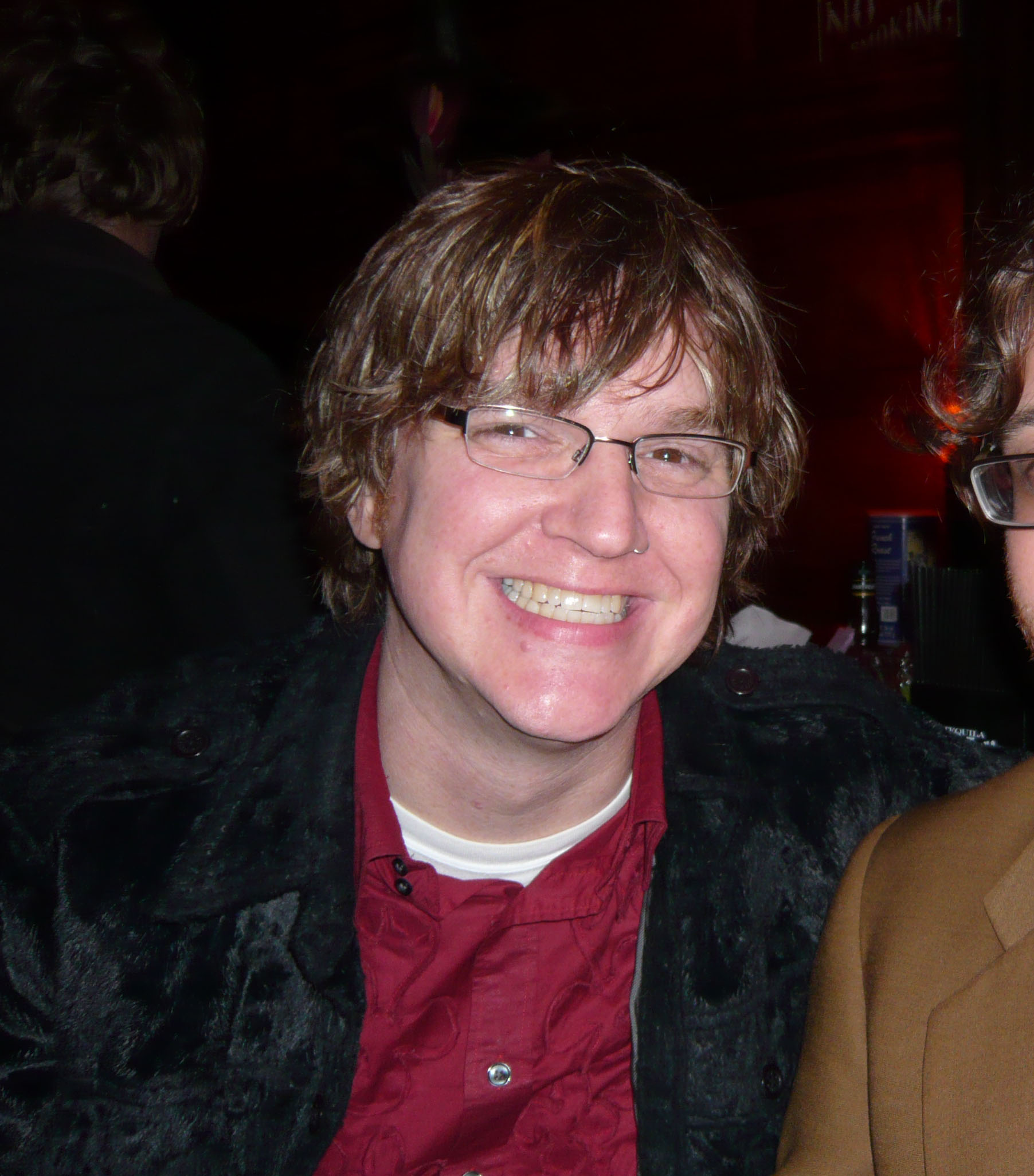
- Jeff Robbins, August 2008, at House of Shields, San Francisco

Background information
- Member of: Orbit

Jeff Lowe Robbins is an American musician and co-founder of the web development company Lullabot.

== Biography ==
Robbins was an employee of O'Reilly & Associates in the early 1990s and participated in the development of Global Network Navigator, the first commercial web publication, before founding the web design company Liquid Media in 1994.

Also in 1994, Robbins and drummer Paul Buckley founded Orbit, a Boston-based power trio that released four CDs. Robbins left the technology industry when the band was signed to A&M Records to focus on touring and recording. Robbins' song "Medicine" appeared on the Billboard Modern Rock chart in 1997 and Orbit appeared on that year's Lollapalooza tour. After A&M Records was absorbed by Universal Music Group, Orbit was dropped and Robbins returned to web development.

In 2001, Robbins married Jennifer Niederst Robbins whom he had met at O'Reilly. The two began building websites together launching several high-profile projects including Ringo Starr's website. Around this time Robbins also began a soundtrack music company called SomeMusic, creating music for several television and radio commercials.

In 2004, Robbins began working with Drupal and became an active participant in the project's developer community. In January 2006, he and developer Matt Westgate co-founded Lullabot, a Drupal-focused consultancy. From 2006 to 2012, Robbins hosted The Lullabot Podcast, the first Drupal-focused podcast which introduced many new developers to the platform. Robbins has also spoken at tech conferences including South By Southwest and the Web 2.0 Summit and he has keynoted at many Drupal events including BADCamp, Design For Drupal, Do It With Drupal, and New England Drupal Camp.

In Robbins' current role as CEO for Lullabot, he has grown the company to over 60 employees. Some of Lullabot's most prominent projects include Grammy.com, MarthaStewart.com, WWE.com, the Sony Music artist platform, as well as major projects for Verizon, Turner Broadcasting, the Pac-12, and Intel. Lullabot also runs Drupalize.Me, a video training website with beginner to advanced Drupal training.

Over the years, Robbins has contributed theme music for several podcasts including FLOSS Weekly on the TWiT.tv network, The Linux Journal Insider, The Lullabot Podcast, The Drupalize.Me Podcast, Insert Content Here, and The Creative Process.
