= Letters to Cleo =

American alternative rock band

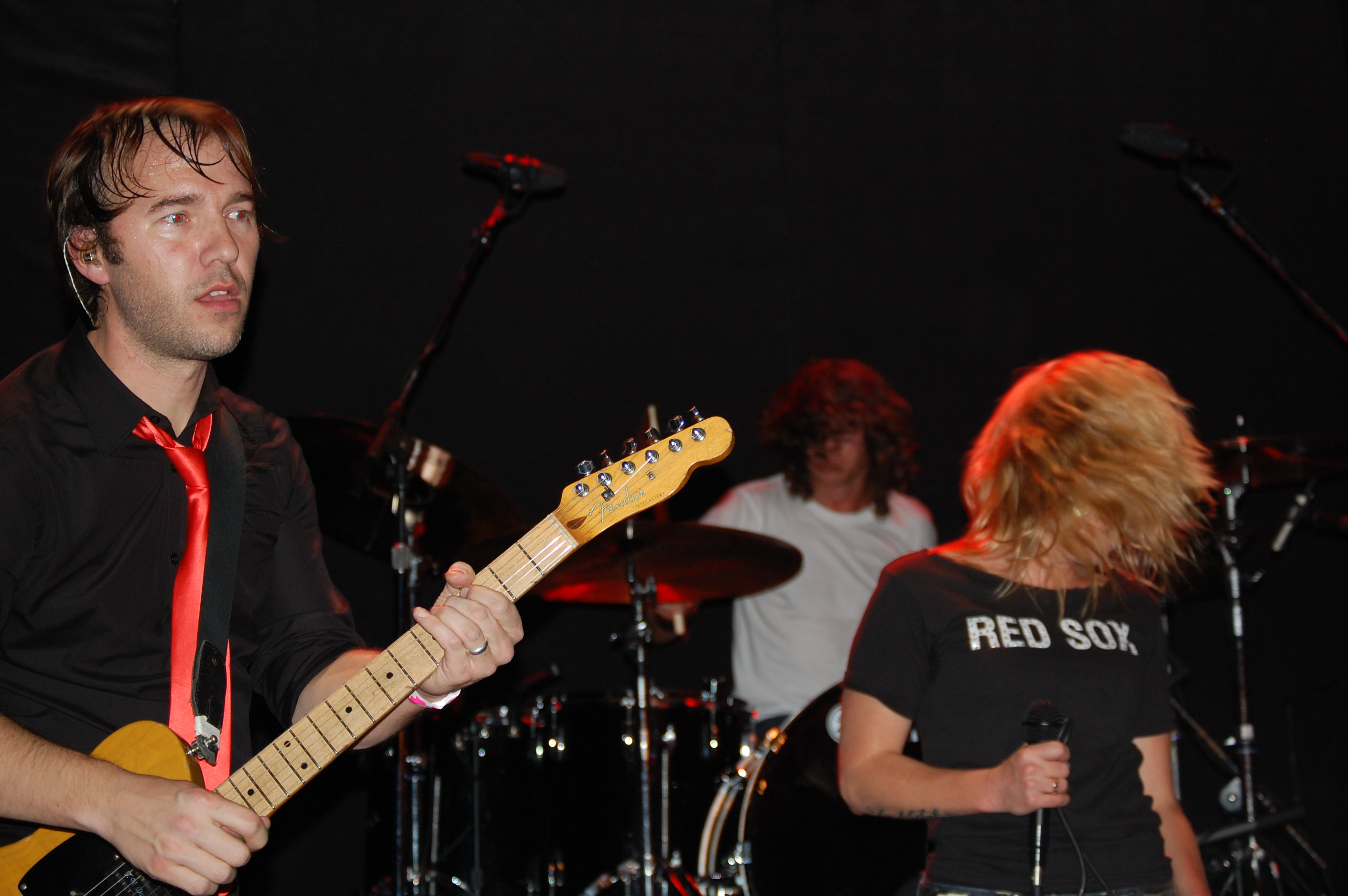
- Letters to Cleo performing in 2008

Background information
- Origin: Boston, Massachusetts, U.S.
- Genres: Alternative rock; power pop
- Years active: 1990–2000, 2008–2009, 2014, 2016–present
- Labels: CherryDisc; Giant; Wicked Disc
- Members: Kay Hanley; Greg McKenna; Michael Eisenstein; Stacy Jones; Joe Klompus
- Past members: Tad Bouve; Jon Olson; Ted Garland; Rick Griffen; Peter Whitehead; Brian Karp; Scott Riebling; Abe Laboriel Jr. Tom Polce; Jason Sutter
- Website: letterstocleo.net

Letters to Cleo is an American alternative rock band originating from Boston, Massachusetts, best known for the 1994 single, "Here & Now", from their full-length debut album, Aurora Gory Alice which topped the Billboard Modern Rock Tracks chart and peaked at 56 on the Billboard Hot 100. The band's members are Kay Hanley, Greg McKenna, Michael Eisenstein, Stacy Jones, Scott Riebling, and later, Tom Polce and Joe Klompus.

The group disbanded in 2000 but reunited for a small tour in 2008. In 2016, the band reunited, and on October 14, 2016, released an EP, titled Back to Nebraska.

In 2025, Jeff Mezydlo of Yardbarker included the band in his list of "20 underrated bands from the 1990s who are worth rediscovering".

== Band history ==
Guitarist Greg McKenna and singer Kay Hanley formed the band Letters to Cleo in 1990. The band was initially called Rebecca Lulu, with Tad Bouve on guitar and Ted Garland on drums with several musicians filling in on bass. In its early phase, the band enlisted various guest players, including a brief period with Abe Laboriel, Jr. as drummer in 1993. The band released a 45 single of "Here & Now" with Rimshak featuring Abe Laboriel on drums with Brian Karp on bass. The band's definitive lineup of Hanley, McKenna, Michael Eisenstein on guitar, Stacy Jones on drums, and Scott Riebling on bass, was established in 1994. The band changed its name to Letters to Cleo in 1990. The name "Letters to Cleo" is a reference to Hanley's childhood pen pal. They spent their summers together in Canada, and they wrote each other letters to keep in touch over a ten-year period. At some point Cleo moved without giving Hanley her new mailing address, and Hanley's letters to Cleo were returned to sender. Hanley rediscovered a box of these letters during the band-naming process, and the band adopted the name. Hanley called it "the least crappy of all the names" they came up with at the time.

Letters to Cleo played gigs in several Boston-area clubs, including T.T. the Bear's Place and The Rathskellar. The band could not seem to find success and was close to breaking up when it recorded their first full-length album, Aurora Gory Alice; Hanley had already started another band on the side at the time. The album was released on CherryDisc Records, a Boston-based independent record label, in 1993. The album received extensive airplay around New England. In 1994, the Billboard published a review of the album and the next day the band played a much-hyped show at South by Southwest in Austin, which made several recording labels very interested in signing the band. Letters to Cleo decided to sign a record deal with Giant Records, a Warner Brothers subsidiary, in 1994, and it re-released Aurora Gory Alice worldwide in 1995.

Soon after signing the deal, their new record label was asked to compile a soundtrack for "Melrose Place", and the record label decided to put "Here & Now" on it. "Here & Now" was an instant hit, and the song reached number 10 on the Billboard Modern Rock Singles chart.

On August 1, 1995, Letters to Cleo released a follow-up album, Wholesale Meats and Fish. Its release was followed by extensive tours with Our Lady Peace, Sponge, Ned's Atomic Dustbin, and others. The single "Awake" achieved moderate rotation on alternative radio. The band also recorded a cover of The Cars song "Dangerous Type" for the major motion picture The Craft.

In 1997, Stacy Jones left the band to join Veruca Salt and was replaced by Tom Polce. That same year, the band released their third album Go!. After a short tour, Polce left the band and was replaced by drummer Jason Sutter. In late 1997, Letters to Cleo parted ways with their record label Giant/Revolution.

1998 saw the release of some early demos and B-sides in the form of the Sister album released originally by Wicked Disc.

Letters to Cleo appeared in the 1999 film 10 Things I Hate About You as a favorite band of the character portrayed by Julia Stiles. They contributed four songs to the soundtrack for the film, which included a Cheap Trick cover ("I Want You to Want Me"), and a Nick Lowe & Ian Gomm cover ("Cruel to Be Kind"). Also included were two original tracks, "Come On", and the beginning of "Co-Pilot" (which can be heard at the end of the scene of their performance at a local club). Whereas the covers appeared on the film's soundtrack, "Come On" was released as an MP3 download on the band's website. "Co-Pilot" was also not on the film's soundtrack, but it appeared on Letters To Cleo's album Go!. In the closing credits, they were mistakenly credited as Letter to Cleo.

During that same year, the band opened for Cheap Trick at The Paradise Club in Boston. The band then recorded 15 new original songs for the Kids' WB cartoon Generation O! which aired from 2000 to 2001.

The band played its final show on May 4, 2000, a benefit for their friend and longtime local supporter, Mikey D. They announced their disbandment the following month. In 2008 they went on a reunion tour and again in 2016.

Kay Hanley provided the singing voice for Rachael Leigh Cook's character in the 2001 film Josie and the Pussycats. Letters to Cleo's 1999 recording of "I Want You to Want Me" was also used in the film, although it was not included on the soundtrack album.

== Reunion ==
In December 2007, an impromptu reunion occurred when four of the original band members appeared at a benefit for longtime supporter Jeanne Connolly, at TT the Bear's Place in Cambridge, Massachusetts. The members reunited officially for a series of shows a year later in Los Angeles, Boston and New York City. More dates followed in 2009 with shows in New Orleans, Dallas, Houston, and Austin. Bassist Scott Reibling did not participate in these shows but gave his blessing. Longtime friend of the band Joe Klompus replaced Reibling.

As of July 2009, the band members returned to their own projects.

In the Parks and Recreation Season 4 episode entitled "The Comeback Kid", the character Ben Wyatt is seen wearing a Letters to Cleo shirt (show star Amy Poehler attended Boston College during the band's early years). This resulted in Letters to Cleo being a trending topic on Twitter. The band reunited to play a fictional concert on the sixth-season finale of Parks and Recreation.

In February 2016, Letters to Cleo was back together and recording new music. The band's Facebook and Twitter feeds have been active with status updates, pictures and videos of ongoing recording.

Letters to Cleo appeared as the musical guest at Geek Bowl XII, the twelfth annual event of its kind put on by Geeks Who Drink Pub Quizzes. The event took place in the band's hometown of Boston on Saturday, February 17, 2018.

The band released their holiday EP Ok Christmas November 2019.

As of 2022, LTC has been playing reunion shows periodically in the Northeast and California. The lineup includes both Stacy Jones and Tom Polce alternating playing drums show to show along with Kay Hanley, Michael Eisenstein, Greg McKenna, and Joe Klompus.

In 2023, band members Kay Hanley and Tom Polce wrote ten original songs for "Subspace Rhapsody," the musical-themed ninth episode of the second season of Star Trek: Strange New Worlds.

== Solo careers ==
Most of the band members also have solo careers. Most notable is Kay Hanley's career, which produced the albums Cherry Marmalade in 2002, The Babydoll EP in 2004, and Weaponize in 2008. She provided singing vocals for Rachael Leigh Cook in the 2001 film Josie and the Pussycats. In 2003, Hanley collaborated with musician Jun Senoue for the song "Follow Me" in the video game Sonic Heroes. Hanley has also been involved with Disney on several children's projects, including the Disney Channel's My Friends Tigger & Pooh, as well as writing all original songs for Disney Junior's hit series, Doc McStuffins.

Michael Eisenstein has been doing session work and touring work for many artists including Our Lady Peace and Lisa Loeb. He is a producer and engineer.

Hanley and Eisenstein married in the late '90s and have two children, Zoe Mabel and Henry Aaron (named for legendary baseball Hall Of Famer). They split up in 2010.

Drummer Stacy Jones went on to form American Hi-Fi with fellow Boston musicians Drew Parsons, Jamie Arentzen and Brian Nolan. In addition to being the musical director and drummer for Miley Cyrus, Jones is also the musical director for Life of Dillon. Previous gigs also include playing drums for Matchbox Twenty, Madonna, Dia Frampton, Veruca Salt, Avril Lavigne, Ariana Grande, Joan Jett, Against Me!, The Jonas Brothers, The Flaming Lips, Lily Allen, Billy Ray Cyrus, Sheryl Crow, Cobra Starship, Aimee Mann, The Cab, Hey Monday, Butch Walker, and more.

Scott Riebling went into the production side of music. He has produced work for The Von Bondies, Cobra Starship and Fall Out Boy. Riebling resides in Massachusetts. His brother Eric Riebling plays bass in Pittsburgh band The Affordable Floors. He co-owns a pizza chain (Stoked Pizza) located in the Boston area.

Co-founding member Greg McKenna is playing live with his new band, City Rivals. McKenna resides in Dorchester, Massachusetts.

Tom Polce played with several prominent Boston-based bands and is a producer and engineer. He lives in California.

== Band members ==
Current members

- Kay Hanley – lead vocals, rhythm guitar (1990–2000, 2008–2009, 2014, 2016–present)
- Greg McKenna – lead guitar, backing vocals (1990–2000, 2008–2009, 2014, 2016–present)
- Michael Eisenstein – rhythm guitar, keyboards, backing vocals (1992–2000, 2008–2009, 2014, 2016–present)
- Stacy Jones – drums, percussion (1993–1997, 2008–2009, 2014, 2016–present)
- Joe Klompus – bass, backing vocals (2008–2009, 2014, 2016–present)

Former members

- Tad Bouve – rhythm guitar (1990)
- Jon Olson – bass (1990)
- Ted Garland – drums (1990)
- Rick Griffen – bass (1990–1991)
- Peter Whitehead – drums (1990–1992)
- Brian Karp – bass (1991–1993)
- Abe Laboriel Jr. – drums (1992–1993)
- Scott Riebling – bass, backing vocals (1993–2000)
- Tom Polce – drums (1997)
- Jason Sutter – drums (1997–2000)

== Discography ==
=== Studio albums ===
Year	Title	Billboard 200	Heatseekers
1993	Aurora Gory Alice	123	3
1995	Wholesale Meats and Fish	188	11
1997	Go!	-	45
2016	Back to Nebraska (EP)	-	22
2019	OK Christmas (EP)	-	-
2023	Bad Man (EP)	-	-

=== Other albums ===
Year	Title	Billboard 200	Heatseekers
1998	Sister	-	-
2008	When Did We Do That?	-	-
2009	From Boston Massachusetts	-	-

=== Cassettes ===
Year	Title
1990	Letters to Cleo

=== Singles ===
Year	Song	Chart positions					Album
Year	Song	US Alt	Billboard Hot 100	Hot 100 Airplay	Hot 100 Singles Sales	Top 40 Mainstream	Album
1994	"Here & Now"	10	56	72	69	40	Aurora Gory Alice
1995	"Awake"	17	88	-	-	-	Wholesale Meats and Fish
1996	"Dangerous Type"	-	-	-	-	-	The Craft OST
1997	"Anchor"	-	-	-	-	-	Go!
1999	"I Want You to Want Me"/"Cruel to Be Kind"	-	-	-	-	-	10 Things I Hate About You OST

== In popular culture ==
On the television show Parks and Recreation, Ben Wyatt (Adam Scott) wears a Letters to Cleo shirt on multiple occasions while he is between jobs. Letters to Cleo also makes an appearance on the show, playing during the Pawnee/Eagleton Unity Concert in the last episode of Season 6. Hanley said that the show's head writer, Mike Schur, is from Boston and let the band know it would be funny for the character to wear the shirt on the show.

== See also ==
- List of alternative music artists
