= Jason Sutter =

American musician and drummer (born 1969)

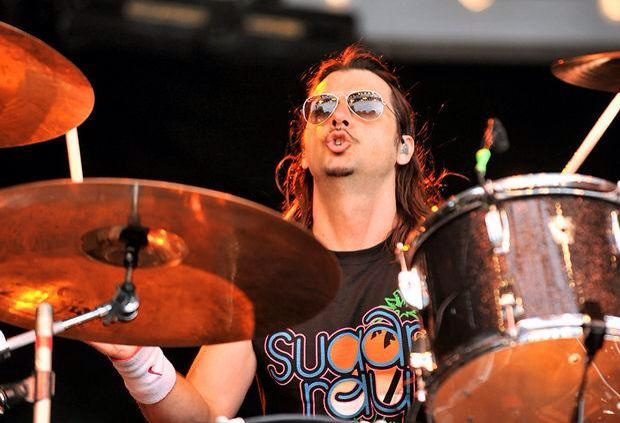
- Jason Sutter performing live with Smash Mouth, California, U.S., August 2014.

Background information
- Born: July 15, 1969 (age 57); Potsdam, New York, U.S.
- Genres: Rock; alternative rock
- Occupation: Drummer
- Formerly of: Smash Mouth
- Website: jasonsutter.com

Jason Sutter (born July 15, 1969) is an American musician and drummer based in Los Angeles, California. He is the former drummer of Smash Mouth, and toured with Cher from 2017 to 2020.

As a drummer, having studied and performed across multiple genres, Sutter is most recognized within the rock genre for his associations with bands such as Marilyn Manson, New York Dolls, Chris Cornell (Soundgarden, Audioslave), and Foreigner among others.

== Early life ==
Originally from Potsdam, New York, Sutter's interest in playing drums began early as a young child, and was supported by his parents. He took initial lessons with Jim Petercsak, a musician and instructor who also taught other drummers including Dave Weckl and Vinnie Colaiuta.

Sutter performed professionally for the first time at age ten, and by age thirteen had formed a band with three friends known as Paragon. Performing frequently at local clubs, venues, and events throughout his early teens and high school, Sutter played up to three gigs per week while also furthering his interest in music scholastically.

After high school graduation, Sutter attended the University of North Texas, receiving a bachelor's degree in music education. Following this, he attended the University of Miami to broaden his scope of learning which included marimba, orchestral, drum corps, and other disciplines, and he earned a master's degree in orchestral percussion in 1995. During graduate school in Miami, Sutter taught, performed, and recorded with top ensembles including the university's highly regarded concert jazz band and other professional shows, which soon led to his first tour with recording artist Juliana Hatfield.

== Career ==
Over the next several years Sutter would gain more recognition, recording and playing with a range of artists, bands, and musical acts including Letters to Cleo, Jack Drag, Ben Lee, The Rembrandts, Vertical Horizon, Jason Faulkner, Babyface, Pink, The Campfire Girls, Chantal Kreviazuk, Joe Walsh, Butch Walker, Our Lady Peace, Dean and Robert DeLeo of Stone Temple Pilots, Nina Gordon of Veruca Salt, and American Hi-Fi in addition to (the aforementioned) Marilyn Manson, Smash Mouth, New York Dolls, Chris Cornell, The Joe Perry Project and Foreigner.

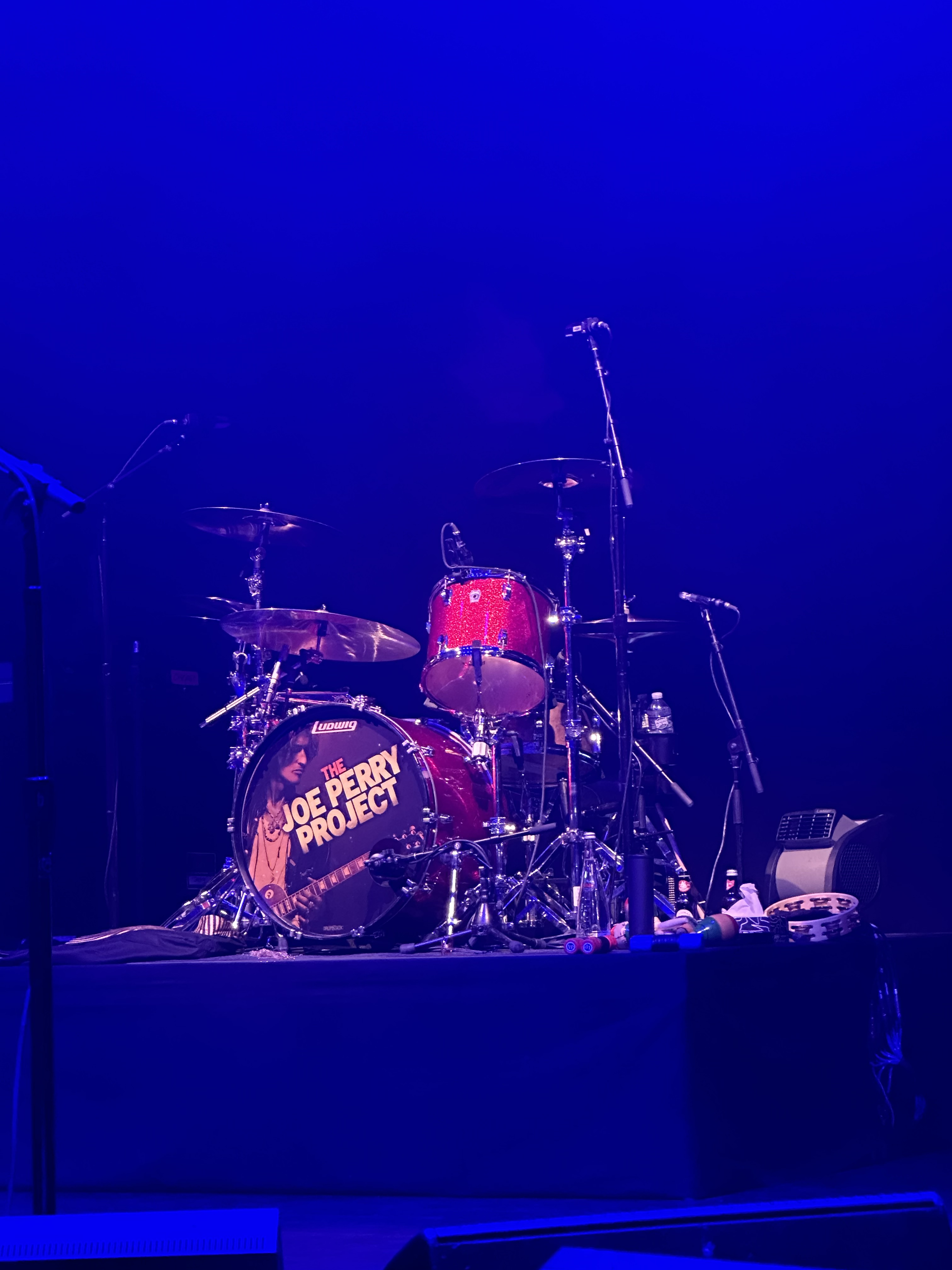
Jason Sutter's drum set used with the Joe Perry Project in 2025.

From 2006 to 2009, Sutter toured and recorded with Chris Cornell. In 2010, Sutter recorded and toured with the bands Vertical Horizon and Foreigner, and then joined the New York Dolls for two international tours which would continue the following two years. In 2012, soon after returning from the New York Dolls' worldwide tour, Sutter joined Marilyn Manson touring globally again the subsequent two years.

In addition to recording and touring, Sutter's performances include television appearances on programs such as The Tonight Show with Jay Leno, Late Night with Conan O'Brien, The Carson Daly Show, and The Late Show with David Letterman.

It was announced in 2014 that Sutter, having previously toured and recorded with Smash Mouth circa 2005 to 2006, had returned to the band as drummer for their 20th anniversary worldwide tour, titled Under The Sun.

In 2016, Sutter began touring Japan with Tak Matsumoto, and followed in 2017 by a series of drum clinics across Europe. The same year he embarked on an extensive summer festival tour with Twisted Sister's Dee Snider.

From 2017 to 2020, Sutter been performed with Cher at her Las Vegas residency and across the world on her sold-out arena tours.

In August and September of 2025, Sutter filled in on drums with the Joe Perry Project.

Sutter also conducts drum clinics and lectures at various conventions, industry events, and universities throughout the United States. In 2014, together with Regal Tip, Sutter produced a signature line of drum sticks and brushes which include "Chop Sticks" and "The Sutter", respectively. Additionally, Sutter has endorsed brands such as Ludwig Drums, Paiste cymbals, and Remo drumheads.
