= Scruffy The Cat =

American roots rock band

- Origin: Boston, Massachusetts, U.S.
- Genres: Roots rock, pop, cowpunk
- Years active: 1983–1990, 2011
- Label: Relativity Records
- Past members: Charlie Chesterman; Stephen Fredette; MacPaul Stanfield; Randall Lee Gibson IV; Stona Fitch; Burns Stanfield
- Website: scruffythecat.com

Scruffy The Cat was a roots rock/pop/cowpunk band from Boston, active from 1983 to 1990. They also played a few reunion shows in 2011, prior to the death of lead singer and guitarist Charlie Chesterman in 2013.

At times credited as a forefather of the alt-country movement, the band's line-up consisted of Charlie Chesterman (guitar, harmonica, vocals); Stephen Fredette (lead guitar, vocals); MacPaul Stanfield (bass); Randall Lee Gibson IV (drums); Stona Fitch (electric banjo, mandolin, accordion, keyboards 1984-87); and Burns Stanfield (keyboards 1987-90). Their music was once described as "a combination of early Elvis Costello and the Attractions with a touch of Jason & the Scorchers’ tough country punk and the American jangle of the Byrds."

== Early years and output ==
Lead singer Charlie Chesterman and bassist MacPaul Stanfield played together in The Law, one of Iowa’s first punk bands, in the late 1970s, along with future Young Fresh Fellows drummer Tad Hutchinson. Chesterman and Stanfield moved from Iowa to Boston to become part of that city`s more active music scene. In 1983, they met guitarist Stephen Fredette, drummer Randall Lee Gibson IV and banjo player Stona Fitch and began prowling local clubs.

The band was signed to Relativity Records in 1986 and released its first two EPs, High Octane Revival (1986) and Boom Boom Boom Bingo (1987). High Octane Revival was voted the #4 EP of 1986 in the Village Voice's "Pazz & Jop" Critics list. In 1987, Scruffy The Cat released its debut album, Tiny Days, with the singles "Never Never/Time Never Forgets" and "Mybabyshesallright". Tiny Days was in the top 5 of college national radio charts and ranked #4 in the Village Voice year end critics poll of 1987. Videos for the two singles received rotation on MTV's 120 Minutes, and the album Tiny Days was one of the top 10 college albums in Rolling Stone upon its release. In 1988, the band released its second album, Moons Of Jupiter, which was followed by the single "Love Song #9" in 1989. Moons Of Jupiter was recorded in Memphis with famed producer Jim Dickinson at the legendary Ardent Studios. Chris Heim of the Chicago Tribune wrote that Moons of Jupiter is a "more relaxed and polished effort that wraps the group's typically catchy pop hooks in the fuzzy warmth of sweet Memphis soul." Moons of Jupiter spent eight weeks on the Billboard 200 album list, peaking at number 177. The first single from the LP, also titled Moons of Jupiter, peaked at number 23 on the Billboard Modern Rock Tracks chart.

== Touring life, breakup & reunions ==
Following a couple of initial shows in 1983, Scruffy The Cat toured almost non-stop between 1984 and 1990, playing mostly in and around the Boston area in 1984 and 1985, but then extending their reach regionally and then nationally. They had several national tours and shared the bill with such acts as The Replacements, Yo La Tengo, and Los Lobos. The band played its final shows in 1990 before disbanding. In 2011, Scruffy The Cat played three reunion shows in the Boston area, with the initial show being arranged as a benefit concert for the cancer-stricken Chesterman. Chesterman died in November 2013.

== Time Never Forgets: The revival of Scruffy The Cat ==
On August 19, 2014, Sony Music released all of Scruffy The Cat's officially released material, remastered as a 38-track package titled Time Never Forgets: The Anthology (86-88), available by download only from iTunes, Amazon.com and Google. On September 16, 2014, Omnivore Recordings released a 23-track collection of previously unreleased and rare recordings titled The Good Goodbye: Unreleased Recordings 1984-1990.

On Saturday, July 25, 2015, Scruffy the Cat played the last ever set at T.T. the Bear's Place in Cambridge, MA.

== Discography ==
- High Octane Revival (1986)
- Tiny Days (1987)
- Boom Boom Boom Bingo (1987)
- Moons of Jupiter (1988)

=== Compilations ===
- Time Never Forgets: The Anthology (86-88) (Sony 2014)
- The Good Goodbye: Unreleased Recordings 1984-1990 (Omnivore 2014)
