= Kay Hanley =

American singer and songwriter

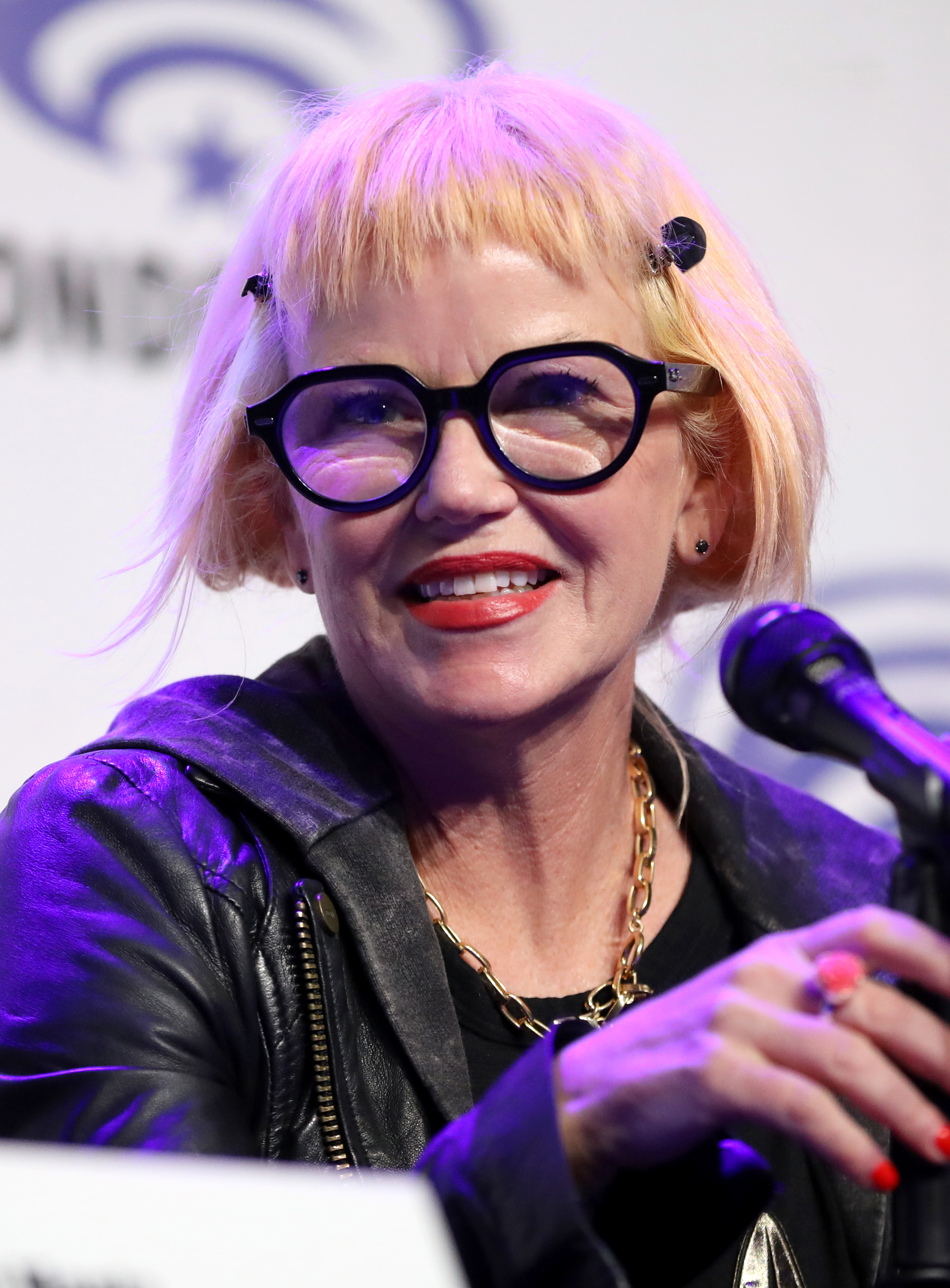
- Hanley at the 2024 WonderCon

Background information
- Born: Kathleen Hanley; September 11, 1968 (age 58); Boston, Massachusetts, U.S.
- Genres: Rock; folk; pop; acoustic; alternative
- Instruments: Vocals; guitar
- Years active: 1990–present
- Labels: Zoë; De Guerre
- Member of: Letters to Cleo

Kathleen Hanley (born September 11, 1968) is an American singer and songwriter. She is best known as the vocalist for the alternative rock band Letters to Cleo.

== Life and career ==
Kathleen Hanley grew up in the Dorchester neighborhood of Boston. Among her neighbors was Donnie Wahlberg. Hanley grew up in what she called a "very strict Irish-Catholic family"; because her parents limited her TV viewing, Hanley listened to the radio instead, usually WBZ when it was a music station in the 1970s.

She attended school at St. Gregory's and Latin Academy. She has been lead singer/songwriter for rock band Letters to Cleo since 1990. The band name was inspired by Hanley's childhood penpal.

In 1996, she co-starred alongside Gary Cherone in Boston Rock Opera's performance of Jesus Christ Superstar as Mary Magdalene.

In 1999, Hanley appeared as herself in the film 10 Things I Hate About You, singing a cover version of Nick Lowe's "Cruel to Be Kind" to Heath Ledger and Julia Stiles at their characters' high school prom, in addition to performing original song "Come On" with Letters to Cleo during an earlier scene at a club. Towards the end of the 90s she began performing with her then-husband and fellow Letters To Cleo member Michael Eisenstein outside of the band. Around the same time, she gave birth to their daughter, Zoe Mabel.

== Songwriting ==
In 1999, Hanley began a shift in her music career. She wrote and performed songs for the Kids' WB cartoon series Generation O! along with the rest of Letters to Cleo and provided the singing voice for Rachael Leigh Cook's character Josie in the movie Josie and the Pussycats. In 2002, she released her first solo album, Cherry Marmalade. That same year saw the release of Face to Face vs. Dropkick Murphys, a split EP by Dropkick Murphys and Face to Face that featured Hanley on the original version of the Dropkick Murphys' song "The Dirty Glass". The song would be re-recorded a year later for the band's album Blackout with their merchandise seller Stephanie Dougherty replacing Hanley on vocals.

In 2003, Hanley was approached by Jun Senoue from Sega to co-write and perform on an original song for the video game Sonic Heroes. The result was the song "Follow Me."

In 2004, Hanley released a follow-up to Cherry Marmalade, The Babydoll EP. That same year, she and her then-husband Michael Eisenstein had their second child, Henry Aaron, the name given in honor of baseball player Hank Aaron and their love for baseball.

In August 2005, Hanley recorded a cover of Iggy Pop's "Lust for Life" for the soundtrack of the Reese Witherspoon film Just Like Heaven. In September 2005, she appeared on The Tonight Show with Jay Leno as part of a pre-taped man-on-the-street segment, singing a song about falling in love at Starbucks.

Hanley is popular with fans of the New England Patriots thanks to the team at one point going 8–0 after she sang the pre-game National Anthem at Gillette Stadium. The streak came to an end when the Patriots lost on January 10, 2010, to the Baltimore Ravens. Hanley is also very involved with the Boston-based charity "Hot Stove, Cool Music," both as performer and spokesperson for the semi-annual event, which has raised over 6 million dollars for The Foundation To Be Named Later

She sang the theme song for My Friends Tigger & Pooh, a half-hour Disney Channel TV show that premiered on Playhouse Disney on May 12, 2007, and "We Are Care Bears" from Care Bears: Oopsy Does It! and its tv series' theme song Care Bears: Adventures in Care-a-Lot.

Hanley and longtime writing partner Michelle Lewis currently compose all-original songs for animated television shows such as the hit Disney series Doc McStuffins., Cartoon Network/WB's DC Super Hero Girls, and Harvey Girls Forever and Ada Twist, Scientist on Netflix. Hanley won a 2022 Emmy Award for songwriting on We The People.

She and writing partners Michelle Lewis, Dan Petty, and Charlton Pettus created Kindergarten: The Musical, which debuted in 2024 on Disney Junior. Hanley serves as executive producer.

She is co-executive director of Songwriters of North America, an LA-based non-profit which advocates for fair pay and other rights for songwriters. Due to her work with SONA in getting the Music Modernization Act passed into law in October 2018, Hanley was elected Vice Chair of the Mechanical Licensing Collective's Unclaimed Royalties Oversight Committee in August 2019.

On Thanksgiving Day 2007, Hanley sang a song called "Caring Changes The World" in the Macy's Thanksgiving Day Parade on the Care Bears float.

In 2007–08, Hanley toured as a back-up singer with Miley Cyrus for Hannah Montana concerts and events.

Hanley's latest album, Weaponize, was released May 27, 2008.

Hanley co-wrote "Don't Wanna Be Famous" on the band The Dollyrots' eponymous album.

In 2014, Kay Hanley appeared in the Parks and Recreation season 6 finale, performing her song "Here & Now" at the Pawnee-Eagleton Unity Concert. The character of Ben Wyatt, played by Adam Scott, is seen offstage in his Letters to Cleo t-shirt, blissfully watching the band as Hanley winks at him. Hanley is seen later in the episode entering Tom Haverford's new restaurant, Tom's Bistro.

In 2020, at the height of the COVID-19 pandemic, she appeared as lead vocalist in a "distanced" music video, a cover of Donnie Iris's "Ah! Leah!" Later that year, she appeared on Saving for a Custom Van, a tribute album for Adam Schlesinger, with whom she had worked on Josie and the Pussycats, following his death from COVID-19. She performed the Fountains of Wayne song "Radiation Vibe" in his memory.

Hanley married audio engineer Clayton Janes in 2021 in Bentonville, Arkansas.

In 2023, Hanley and her Letters to Cleo bandmate Tom Polce wrote the songs for “Subspace Rhapsody,” an episode of Star Trek: Strange New Worlds performed in the style of a broadway musical.

== Discography ==
=== Pet Projects ===
The title of this section indicates projects that both Hanley and Eisenstein have taken an active interest in developing, in terms of playing multiple roles, including production as well as composition and/or instrumentation.

Year	Artist	Title	Label	Role
2003	The Gentlemen	Blondes Prefer the Gentlemen	Sodapop Records	Vocals
2007	Murder Capitol of the World	St. Jude's Revenge	Dot Rat	Vocals
2008	Cruiserweight	Big Bold Letters	Doghouse/Siren Songs	Composer, Background Vocals

=== Solo ===
Year	Title	Label
2002	Cherry Marmalade	Zoë Records
2003	The Paradise - Boston, MA 5/30/03 (live)	Instant Live
2004	The Babydoll EP	Instant Live
2004	The Paradise - Boston, MA 8/26/04 (live)	Instant Live
2006	Kay Hanley / Scamper split single CD	De Guerre/Scamper
2008	Weaponize	De Guerre

=== Soundtracks ===
Year	Title	Label
1996	The Craft	Sony
1999	10 Things I Hate About You	Hollywood Records
2001	Music from the Motion Picture Josie and the Pussycats	Sony
2003	Sonic Heroes	Pioneer/Geneon
2005	Just Like Heaven	Sony

=== Special appearances ===
Year	Artist	Title	Label	Role
1995	Mary Karlzen	Yelling at Mary	Atlantic Records	Background vocals
2002	Dropkick Murphys	Face to Face vs. Dropkick Murphys	Vagrant Records	Co-lead vocals on "The Dirty Glass"
2002	James Taylor	October Road	Sony	Choir, chorus
2006	Agnes Chan	Forget Yourself	Bungalo Records	Background vocals
2006	Peter Gammons	Never Slow Down, Never Grow Old	Rounder	Vocals
2008	Lisa Loeb	Camp Lisa	Furious Rose Productions	Vocal harmony
2009	Will Dailey	Torrent, Vols. 1 & 2	BS	Background vocals
2010	Lindsey Ray	Goodbye from California	LRay	Composer
2010	The Posies	Blood/Candy	Rykodisc	Vocals
2011	Bowling for Soup	Fishin' for Woos	MRI	Vocals, sounds
2011	Will Dailey	Will Dailey & the Rivals	Universal Republic Records	Composer

== Filmography ==
Year	Title	Role	Type
1999	10 Things I Hate About You	Herself	Cameo
2000	Generation O!	Molly O's singing voice	Voice
2001	Josie and the Pussycats	Josie McCoy	Singing voice
2007–2008	My Friends Tigger & Pooh	opening song performer (Season 1)	Performer
2008	Hannah Montana & Miley Cyrus: Best of Both Worlds Concert	Herself	Background vocals
2014	Parks and Recreation	Herself	Cameo
