= Stacy Jones =

American rock musician

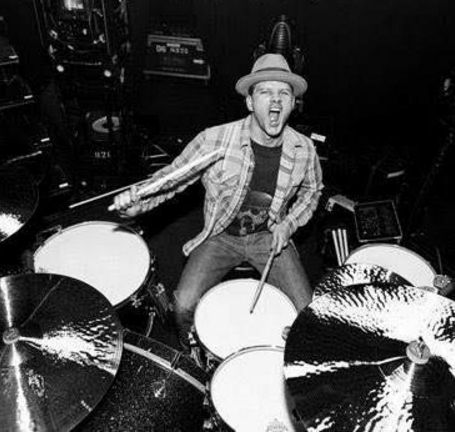

Background information
- Born: Stacy Glen Jones; December 19, 1970 (age 55); Tulsa, Oklahoma, U.S.
- Origin: Boston, Massachusetts, U.S.
- Genres: Power pop, pop punk, alternative rock, punk rock
- Occupations: Musician, songwriter, producer, engineer
- Instruments: Vocals, guitar, drums
- Label: Universal Publishing

Stacy Glen Jones (born December 19, 1970) is an American musician, songwriter, and producer. He is currently the musical director and drummer for Miley Cyrus and Life of Dillon, and is also known for being the lead vocalist, rhythm guitarist, and primary songwriter of American Hi-Fi, and as the drummer for Letters to Cleo.

== Background ==
Jones was born in Tulsa, Oklahoma but grew up in London. Jones initially came into the spotlight as the drummer for the alternative rock band Letters to Cleo. He went on to work with Veruca Salt and form the band American Hi-Fi, whose self-titled release produced by Bob Rock in 2001, included the Billboard Top 50 hit "Flavor of the Weak." After American Hi-Fi Jones worked as a producer and songwriter, and was a staff producer at Epic Records. His production credits include work with Miley Cyrus, American Hi-Fi, Hey Violet, Matt Nathanson, Laura Marano, The Downtown Fiction, Ingrid Michaelson, Low vs Diamond, Meg & Dia and Plain White T's. He is also half of the production duo Deathstar Productions with writer/producer Bill Lefler, and was a VP of A&R at Epic Records.

== Career ==
=== Musical director ===
During the height of MTV's reality show Laguna Beach, Jones was tasked with producing and A&Ring Open Air Stereo. Jones worked with the band to help bring their live show to a television audience for the first time on MTV's Total Request Live. He was then approached to be the music director for Miley Cyrus, with whom he has been working with since 2006.

In addition to Miley Cyrus, Jones is the musical director for Noah Cyrus, 5 Seconds of Summer, Broods, Troye Sivan, Jordan Fisher, Life of Dillon, Shawn Hook, and The Chainsmokers.

=== Drummer ===
Jones continues to write, release records and tour with Letters to Cleo. He was the touring drummer for Matchbox Twenty from 2012 - 2023. He has also worked as a studio and touring musician for Madonna, Everclear, Dia Frampton, Veruca Salt, Letters to Cleo, Avril Lavigne, Ariana Grande, Joan Jett, Against Me!, The Jonas Brothers, The Flaming Lips, Lily Allen, Billy Ray Cyrus, Sheryl Crow, Cobra Starship, Aimee Mann, The Cab, Hey Monday, Butch Walker, The Dollyrots and more.

=== Production / musician credits ===
Artist	Album	Credit	Year
Letters to Cleo	Back To Nebraska EP	Writer, drummer, producer	2016
American Hi-Fi	American Hi-Fi (Acoustic)	Writer, producer	2016
American Hi-Fi	Blood & Lemonade	Writer, producer	2014
Miley Cyrus	MTV Unplugged	Producer	2014
The Dollyrots	Barefoot and Pregnant	Drummer	2014
Elliot Caroll	Elliot Caroll – EP	Drummer	2011
Ocean Is Theory	TBD	Producer	2010
Hey Monday	Beneath It All	Drummer	2010
The Downtown Fiction	TBD	Producer	2010
The Downtown Fiction	Best I Never Had – EP	Producer	2009
Ingrid Michaelson	Be OK	Co-producer	2008
Low vs Diamond	Low vs Diamond	Producer	2008
The Modern Society	The Beat Goes On	Producer	2007
Endereverafter	From the Ashes of Sin	Producer	2007
Towers of London	Blood, Sweat and Towers	Producer, engineer	2006
Meg & Dia	Something Real	Producer, engineer	2006
Ronnie Day	The Album	Producer, engineer	2006
Candice Accola	It's Always the Innocent Ones	Writer, producer	2006
The Starys	Le Futur Noir	Producer, engineer	2006
Plain White T's	It's So Easy	Producer, engineer	2006
American Hi-Fi	Hearts on Parade	Writer, co-producer	2005
Letters to Cleo	Sister	Writer, drummer	1998
Letters to Cleo	Wholesale Meats and Fish	Writer, drummer	1995
Letters to Cleo	Aurora Gory Alice	Writer, drummer	1993

=== TV appearances ===
The Voice, American Idol, Saturday Night Live, Dancing With the Stars, The Late Show with David Letterman, Jimmy Kimmel Live, The Tonight Show with Jay Leno, Late Night with Conan O'Brien, Good Morning America, Teen Choice Awards, Miley Cyrus: Bangerz Tour (NBC), CMT Music Awards, American Music Awards, Kids Choice Awards, The Today Show, Disney Channel Games, Dick Clark's New Year's Rockin' Eve, MTV Live.
