= List of people from Trenton, New Jersey =

People who were born in, residents of, or otherwise closely associated with Trenton, New Jersey, United States, include:

== Academics ==
- Charles Conrad Abbott (1843–1919), archaeologist and naturalist
- Ndidiamaka Amutah-Onukagha (born 1981), physician who is the Julia A. Okoro Professor of Black Maternal Health at the Tufts University School of Medicine
- Flournoy Coles (c. 1915–1982), official of the United States Department of State who was the first Black faculty member to gain tenure at Vanderbilt University
- Timothy Abbott Conrad (1803–1877), geologist and malacologist
- Mary Joyce Doyle (1923–2016), nun and librarian who founded the library consortium that revolutionized the borrowing of books in Bergen County, New Jersey, through the creation of the Bergen County Cooperative Library System
- Robert B. Duffield (1917–2000), radiochemist who headed the Argonne National Laboratory
- N. Gregory Mankiw (born 1958), macroeconomist
- George T. Reynolds (1917–2005), physicist, known for his accomplishments in particle physics, biophysics and environmental science
- W. Kip Viscusi (born 1949), economist who studies the economics of risk and uncertainty, risk and environmental regulation, law and economics and behavioral economics
- Joshua M. Zeitz (born 1974), historian

== Film and television people ==
- Jean Acker (1893–1978), film actress who was the estranged wife of silent film star Rudolph Valentino
- Betty Bronson (1907–1971), actress
- Zach Cherry (born 1987), actor and comedian, who has appeared on the Apple TV+ series Severance
- Ben DeJesus, documentary filmmaker, television director and producer
- Roxanne Hart (born 1952), actress who appeared in the film Highlander and on television in Chicago Hope
- Alejandro Hernandez, actor who has appeared in New Amsterdam and The Horror of Dolores Roach
- Richard Kind (born 1956), actor and voice actor, known for his roles in the sitcoms Mad About You and Spin City
- Ernie Kovacs (1919–1962), television comedian and film actor
- Judith Light (born 1949), actress
- Amy Locane (born 1971), actress
- Amy Robinson (born 1948). film producer and former actress
- Sommore Rambough (born 1967), comedian
- Ty Treadway (born 1967), host of Merv Griffin's Crosswords
- Danielle Spencer (1965–2025), actress, known for her role as Dee in What's Happening!!
- Sammy Williams (1948–2018), actor, known for his role as Paul in the musical A Chorus Line, for which he won the 1976 Tony Award for Best Featured Actor in a Musical
- Zach Woods (born 1983), actor and comedian

== Artists ==
- Edward Marshall Boehm (1913–1969), sculptor and his wife Helen Boehm (1920–2010), who promoted his works
- Ruth Donnelly (1896–1982), stage and film actress
- Peter Hujar (1934–1987), photographer, known for his black-and-white portraits
- Mel Leipzig (1935–2025), visual artist and arts educator, known for his realist portraits in acrylic paint

== Authors, writers, journalists and poets ==
- Edward Bloor (born 1950), novelist
- Edward Y. Breese (1912–1979), popular fiction writer
- John Brooks (1920–1993), writer and longtime contributor to The New Yorker magazine
- Russell Gordon Carter (1892–1957), writer
- Janis Hirsch (born c. 1950), comedy writer, known for producing and writing for television series
- Pam Houston (born 1962), author of short stories, novels and essays, known for her first book, Cowboys Are My Weakness
- Mary Dagworthy James (1810–1883), hymn writer
- William Mastrosimone (born 1947), playwright
- Mark Osborne (born 1970) film director, writer, producer and animator, whose work includes Kung Fu Panda
- Stacey Patton, journalist, writer, speaker, commentator and college professor
- Ion Hanford Perdicaris (1840–1925) playwright and author wrote about art and Moroccan culture
- Bob Ryan (born 1946), sportswriter, regular contributor on the ESPN show Around the Horn
- Ntozake Shange (1948–2018), playwright and poet, known for the Obie Award-winning play For Colored Girls Who Have Considered Suicide / When the Rainbow Is Enuf
- Geraldine Sharpe (1929–1968), photographer, known for her photographs of landscapes and of Ghana
- Nancy Wood (1936–2013), author, poet and photographer

== Colonial figures ==
- James Francis Armstrong (1750–1816), chaplain in the American Revolutionary War and a Presbyterian minister for 30 years in Trenton
- Samuel John Atlee (1739–1786), soldier and statesman who was a delegate to the Continental Congress for Pennsylvania
- John Cadwalader (1742–1786), commander of Pennsylvania troops during the American Revolutionary War
- Lambert Cadwalader (1742–1823), merchant who fought in the Revolutionary War, then represented New Jersey in the Continental Congress and the United States House of Representatives
- Thomas Cadwalader (1707–1779), physician and namesake of Cadwalader Park
- Philemon Dickinson (1739–1809), lawyer and politician who served as a brigadier general of the New Jersey militia, as a Continental Congressman from Delaware and a United States Senator from New Jersey
- Mary Hays (1744–1832), woman who fought during the Revolutionary War at the Battle of Monmouth, and is generally believed to have been the inspiration of the story of Molly Pitcher

== Government, education and politics ==
- Samuel Alito (born 1950), Associate Justice of the U.S. Supreme Court
- Henry W. Antheil Jr. (1912–1940), American diplomat killed in the shootdown of the Kaleva airplane by Soviet aircraft in the wake of the Soviet occupation of the Baltic States
- John T. Bird (1829–1911), represented New Jersey's 3rd congressional district (1869–1873)
- James Bishop (1816–1895), represented New Jersey's 3rd congressional district in the U.S. House of Representatives (1855–1857)
- Peggy Blackford (born 1942), American Ambassador to Guinea-Bissau from 1995 until relations were suspended in June 1998
- Joseph L. Bocchini Jr. (born 1944), politician who served in the New Jersey General Assembly from the 14th Legislative District from 1982 to 1988
- J. Hart Brewer (1844–1900), represented New Jersey's 2nd congressional district (1881–1885)
- Frank O. Briggs (1851–1913), politician who was the mayor of Trenton from 1899 to 1902, and United States Senator from New Jersey from 1907 to 1913
- Michele Brown, CEO of the New Jersey Economic Development Authority
- James Buchanan (1839–1900), represented New Jersey's 2nd congressional district from 1885 to 1893
- Newton A.K. Bugbee (1876–1965), businessman and politician who served as New Jersey State Comptroller and chairman of the New Jersey Republican State Committee, and was the Republican candidate for Governor of New Jersey in 1919
- Robert J. Burkhardt (1916–1999), politician who served as Secretary of State of New Jersey and chairman of the New Jersey Democratic State Committee
- Aneesh Chopra (born 1972), served as the first Chief Technology Officer of the United States
- Herb Conaway (born 1963), U.S. representative for New Jersey
- James L. Conger (1805–1876), politician who represented Michigan's 3rd congressional district
- Martin Connor (born 1945), former member of the New York State Senate
- Willard S. Curtin (1905–1996), U.S. representative for Pennsylvania
- William Lewis Dayton Jr. (1839–1897), United States Ambassador to the Netherlands
- Wayne DeAngelo (born 1965), politician who has served in the New Jersey General Assembly since 2008, where he represents the 14th Legislative District
- David Dinkins (1927–2020), first black mayor of New York City
- George Washington Doane (1799–1859), churchman, educator (founder of Doane Academy) and bishop in the Episcopal Church for the Diocese of New Jersey
- Frederick W. Donnelly (1866–1935), politician who served as Mayor of Trenton from 1911 until 1932
- Richard Grant Augustus Donnelly (1841–1905), politician who served as Mayor of Trenton from 1884 to 1886
- Thomas A. Ferguson (born 1950), Director of the Bureau of Engraving and Printing from 1998 to 2005
- Richard Funkhouser (1917–2008), geologist and diplomat who served as United States Ambassador to Gabon
- Harry Heher (1889–1972), Justice on the New Jersey Supreme Court
- Charles R. Howell (1904–1973), represented New Jersey's 4th congressional district in the U.S. House of Representatives (1949–1955)
- Elijah C. Hutchinson (1855–1932), represented New Jersey's 4th congressional district (1915–1923)
- Marie Hilson Katzenbach (1882–1970), educator who was the first woman to serve as president of the New Jersey State Board of Education
- Nicholas Katzenbach (1922–2012), U.S. Attorney General during the Johnson Administration
- Dick LaRossa (born 1946), politician and former television presenter who served two terms in the New Jersey Senate, where he represented the 15th Legislative District
- A. Leo Levin (1919–2015), law professor at the University of Pennsylvania Law School
- Sol Linowitz (1913–2005), diplomat, lawyer, and businessman
- Moira K. Lyons, politician who served as a member of the Connecticut House of Representatives from 1981 to 2004
- Francis J. McManimon (1926–2020), politician who served in the New Jersey General Assembly from 1972 to 1982 and in the New Jersey Senate from 1982 to 1992
- Joseph P. Merlino (1922–1998), politician who served as President of the New Jersey Senate from 1978 to 1981
- Hervey Studdiford Moore Sr., a member of the New Jersey General Assembly from 1913 to 1914, and in 1919.
- A. Dayton Oliphant (1887–1963), associate justice of the New Jersey Supreme Court from 1945 to 1946, and again from 1948 to 1957
- Anne M. Patterson (born 1959), associate justice of the New Jersey Supreme Court
- Gregory Anthony Perdicaris (1810–1883), first U.S. Consul to Greece
- D. Lane Powers (1896–1968), represented New Jersey's 4th congressional district in the U.S. House of Representatives (1933–1945)
- Verlina Reynolds-Jackson, politician who represents the 15th Legislative District in the New Jersey General Assembly
- Daniel Bailey Ryall (1798–1864), U.S. Representative from New Jersey (1839–1841)
- Antonin Scalia (1936–2016), Associate Justice of the U.S. Supreme Court
- Sido L. Ridolfi (1913–2004), politician who served in the New Jersey Senate from 1954 to 1972
- Charles Skelton (1806–1879), represented New Jersey's 2nd congressional district (1851–1855)
- Robin L. Titus (born 1954), physician and politician who serves as a Republican member of the Nevada Assembly
- Wesley Updike (1900–1974), educator and soldier, who was the father of author John Updike
- Bennet Van Syckel (1830–1921), associate justice of the New Jersey Supreme Court from 1869 to 1904
- Albert C. Wagner (1911–1987), director of the New Jersey Department of Corrections from 1966 to 1973
- Allan B. Walsh (1874–1953), represented the 4th congressional district (1913–1915)
- Karl Weidel (1923–1997), who served in the New Jersey General Assembly from 1970 to 1986
- Ira W. Wood (1856–1931), represented New Jersey's 4th congressional district (1904–1913)

== Military ==
- Stephen Hart Barlow (1895–1962), served as Quartermaster General of New Jersey from 1934 to 1942
- Clifford Bluemel (1885–1973), United States Army brigadier general who commanded the 31st Division during the Battle of Bataan before being captured by Japanese forces and held as a prisoner of war
- Thomas McCall Cadwalader (1795–1873), United States Army Major general
- Frank William Crilley (1883–1947), United States Navy diver and a recipient of the Medal of Honor
- Samuel Gibbs French (1818–1910), Major General in the Confederate States Army
- William J. Johnston (1918–1990), Medal of Honor recipient for gallantry during World War II
- Needham Roberts (1901–1949), soldier in the Harlem Hellfighters and recipient of the Purple Heart and the Croix de Guerre for his valor during World War I
- Norman Schwarzkopf Jr. (1934–2012), Commander-in-Chief of the U.S. Central Command in the Gulf War
- Peter D. Vroom (1842–1926), Inspector General of the U.S. Army

== Music ==
- George Antheil (1900–1959), pianist, composer, writer and inventor
- Hodgy Beats (born 1990 as Gerard Damien Long), member of the Los Angeles hip-hop collective Odd Future
- Carman (1956–2021), contemporary Christian music singer
- Shawn Corey Carter (born 1969, a.k.a. Jay-Z), rap mogul, CEO
- Charles Chapman (1950–2011), jazz guitarist
- Richie Cole (1948–2020), jazz alto saxophonist
- Johnny Coles (1926–1997), jazz trumpeter
- Richard Crooks (1900–1972), tenor at the New York Metropolitan Opera
- Sarah Dash (1944–2021), singer, formerly of glam rock group, Labelle
- Nona Hendryx (born 1944), singer formerly of glam rock group Labelle
- Wise Intelligent, and other members of the hip hop group Poor Righteous Teachers
- Maury Muehleisen (1949–1973), guitarist and songwriting partner for Jim Croce
- Dean Ween (born 1970), Lead Guitarist, and one half of the band Ween
- Marion Zarzeczna, concert pianist

== Sports ==
- Terrance Bailey (born 1965), former basketball player who led NCAA Division I in scoring playing for Wagner College in 1985–1986
- Bo Belinsky (1936–2001), professional baseball player
- Elvin Bethea (born 1946), Pro Football Hall of Fame defensive end who played his entire NFL career with the Houston Oilers
- Mike Bloom (1915–1993), professional basketball player for the Baltimore Bullets, Boston Celtics, Minneapolis Lakers and Chicago Stags
- Steve Braun (born 1948), professional baseball player
- Tal Brody (born 1943), Euroleague basketball shooting guard who was drafted 12th in the 1965 NBA draft
- Antron Brown (born 1976), drag racer who became the sport's first African-American champion when he won the 2012 Top Fuel National Hot Rod Association championship
- Kahzir Brown (born 2003), defensive back for the Ottawa Redblacks of the Canadian Football League
- Ji'Ayir Brown (born 2000), American football safety for the San Francisco 49ers
- Wally Campbell (1926–1954), stock car, midget, and sprint car racer who was the 1951 NASCAR Modified champion
- George Case (1915–1989), outfielder who played for the Washington Senators
- Terrance Cauthen (born 1976), lightweight boxer who won a bronze medal at the 1996 Summer Olympics
- Al Clark (born 1948), former professional baseball umpire who worked in 3,392 major league games in his 26-year career
- Donald Cogsville (born 1965), former soccer player who earned six caps with the U.S. national team and is CEO of a real estate investment firm
- Gwynneth Coogan (born 1965), former Olympic athlete, educator and mathematician
- Albert Cooper (1904–1993), U.S. Olympic soccer goalkeeper in 1928 who later served in the New Jersey General Assembly
- Hollis Copeland (born 1955), former professional basketball player who played for the New York Knicks
- Narciso Crook (born 1995), professional baseball outfielder for the Chicago Cubs
- Harry Deane (1846–1925), early professional baseball player
- J. J. Dillon (born 1945), former professional wrestler
- Dan Donigan (born 1967), former professional soccer player
- Al Downing (born 1941), professional baseball player
- John Easton (1933–2001), baseball player who played briefly for the Philadelphia Phillies
- Nick Frascella (1914–2000), basketball player who played in the National Basketball League for the Akron Goodyear Wingfoots
- Dave Gallagher (born 1960), professional baseball player
- Samuel Goss (born 1947), boxerwho competed in the men's bantamweight event at the 1968 Summer Olympics
- Greg Grant (born 1966), NBA basketball player
- Mel Groomes (1927–1997), football player and baseball coach who played for the Detroit Lions
- Thomas Hardiman (born 1947), former handball player who competed in the 1972 Summer Olympics in Munich
- Jacke Healey (born 1988), college baseball coach and former shortstop who is co-head coach of the Oakland Golden Grizzlies baseball team
- Roy Hinson (born 1961), professional basketball player
- Dahntay Jones (born 1980), professional basketball player
- Patrick Kerney (born 1976), defensive end who played in the NFL for the Atlanta Falcons and Seattle Seahawks
- Tad Kornegay (born 1982) defensive back for the Saskatchewan Roughriders and BC Lions of the Canadian Football League
- Brandel Littlejohn, professional wrestler who competes for Ring of Honor, where he performs under the ring name "Cheeseburger"
- Lawrence Low (1920–1996), sailor who received a gold medal in the star class with the boat Kathleen at the 1956 Summer Olympics in Melbourne
- Kareem McKenzie (born 1979), offensive tackle for the New York Giants of the National Football League
- Bob Milacki (born 1964), former MLB pitcher who played mostly with the Baltimore Orioles
- Karin Miller (born 1977), former professional tennis player
- Athing Mu (born 2002), gold medalist in the 800 meters at the 2020 Summer Olympics in Tokyo
- George Nemchik (1915–1988), soccer playerwho competed with the U.S. national team and was a member of the 1936 U.S. Olympic Soccer team
- Keith Newell (born 1988), football offensive lineman for the Philadelphia Soul of the Arena Football League
- Gail Peters (born 1929), former competition swimmer who represented the United States at the 1952 Summer Olympics in Helsinki in the 200-meter breaststroke
- Susan Pitt (1948–2024), competition swimmer and world record-holder in the 200-meter butterfly
- Myles Powell (born 1997), basketball player for the Seton Hall Pirates men's basketball team
- Duane Robinson (born 1968), retired professional soccer forward who played in the American Professional Soccer League and the United States Interregional Soccer League
- Dennis Rodman (born 1961), professional basketball player
- Bobby Sanguinetti (born 1988), professional ice hockey defenseman who plays for HC Lugano in the National League
- Carlijn Schoutens (born 1994), Dutch-American speed skater who qualified for the U.S. team at the 2018 Winter Olympics in the women's 3,000-meter event
- Thomas Sorber, college basketball player for the Georgetown Hoyas
- Gary Stills (born 1974), professional American football player
- La'Keisha Sutton (born 1990), professional basketball player for the Harlem Globetrotters
- Alphonso Taylor (born 1969), defensive tackle who played in the NFL for the Denver Broncos
- Curtis Thompson (born 1996), track and field athlete who specializes in the javelin
- Vince Thompson (born 1957), former professional football running back who played in the NFL for the Detroit Lions
- Mike Tiernan (1867–1918), Major League Baseball player
- Dantouma Toure (born 2004), soccer player who plays as a winger for New York Red Bulls II in the USL Championship via the New York Red Bulls Academy
- Troy Vincent (born 1971), former professional football player, president of the NFL Players Association
- Charlie Weis (born 1956), head coach of the Notre Dame Fighting Irish football team from 2005 to 2009
- Nick Werkman (born c. 1941), basketball player for the Seton Hall Pirates, who led the NCAA in scoring in 1962–1963 and was in the top three nationally on his two other collegiate seasons
- Ed Whited (born 1964), former Major League Baseball third baseman who played for the Atlanta Braves during the 1989 season

== Others ==
- Orfeo Angelucci (1912–1993), contactee who claimed to be in ongoing contact with extraterrestrial beings
- Anthony Balaam (born 1965), serial killer known as The Trenton Strangler
- Geoffrey Berman (born 1959), lawyer currently serving as the Interim United States Attorney for the Southern District of New York
- Jude Burkhauser (1947–1998), artist, museum curator and researcher
- Emily Roebling Cadwalader (1879–1941), Philadelphia socialite and yacht owner
- John Lambert Cadwalader (1836–1914), lawyer who was a name partner of Cadwalader, Wickersham & Taft
- Jon Caldara, libertarian activist who serves as the president of the Independence Institute
- Bernard Cywinski (1940–2011), architect who designed the Liberty Bell Center at Independence National Historical Park
- Mathias J. DeVito (1930–2019), businessperson and lawyer who served as the president and chief executive officer of The Rouse Company
- Matthew Edward Duke (1915–1960), pilot who turned to making a living off flying anti-Castro Cubans to exile in the United States for $1,000 a job
- Brian Duperreault (born 1947), CEO of AIG
- Harrington Emerson (1853–1931), efficiency engineer and business theorist
- Al Herpin (1862–1947), known as the "Man Who Never Slept"
- Edward Kmiec (1936–2020), retired Roman Catholic Bishop of Buffalo
- Jonathan LeVine (born 1968), owner of Jonathan LeVine Gallery
- Thomas Maddock (1818–1899), inventor and potter who started the American indoor toilet industry
- J. Lee Nicholson (1863–1924), accountant, consultant and lecturer, considered to be the father of cost accounting in the United States
- Zebulon Pike (1779–1813), explorer and namesake of Pikes Peak
- Joe J. Plumeri (born 1944), chairman and CEO of Willis Group and owner of the Trenton Thunder
- Bruce Ritter (1927–1999), Catholic priest and one-time Franciscan friar who founded the charity Covenant House in 1972 for homeless teenagers and led it until he was forced to resign in 1990
- Frank D. Schroth (1884–1974), owner of the Brooklyn Eagle, had earlier worked as a reporter at The Times
- Thomas N. Schroth (1921–2009), editor of Congressional Quarterly and founder of The National Journal
- Victor W. Sidel (1931–2018), physician who was one of the co-founders of Physicians for Social Responsibility in 1961
- Pat Spirito (1939–1983), soldier and hitman for the Philadelphia Crime Family
- Robert Stempel (1933–2011), chairman and CEO of General Motors
- Adele Woodhouse Erb Sullivan (1907–1998), 26th President General of the Daughters of the American Revolution
- Margaret E. Thompson (1911–1992), numismatist specializing in Greek coins
- Irvin Ungar (born 1948), former pulpit rabbi and antiquarian bookseller, considered the foremost expert on the artist Arthur Szyk
- Albert W. Van Duzer (1917–1999), bishop of the Episcopal Diocese of New Jersey, serving from 1973 to 1982
