= Joyride (Oleander album) =

Studio album by Oleander
- Released: March 4, 2003
- Recorded: 2002
- Studio: Mousehouse & Mousepad (Pasadena, California)
- Genre: Post-grunge; alternative metal
- Length: 41:58
- Label: Sanctuary
- Producer: Rich Mouser

Oleander chronology
Runaway Train EP (2002)	Joyride (2003)	Something Beautiful (2013)

Singles from Joyride
- 1. "Hands Off the Wheel" Released: January 28, 2003

Joyride is the fourth studio album by American rock band Oleander. It was released on March 4, 2003, through Sanctuary Records. The album marks a return to the band's focus on aggressive hard rock that was less apparent on their previous, more experimental effort, Unwind (2001).

== Overview ==
Joyride was originally planned for a November 2002 release, but since it was not yet completed, Oleander released the Runaway Train EP at concerts to hold fans over. The EP revolved around its title track, which a month prior was featured in the Showtime film Bang Bang You're Dead. A music video was also shot and incorporated footage from the film.

In an interview with Billboard, frontman Thomas Flowers elaborated on the creative direction on Joyride in the aftermath of Unwind:

"We really wanted to stretch our tastes and try to present an album that was a little more diversified as far as instrumentation. . . It didn't necessarily pan out for us, so we kind of stripped that down to doing what we're good at: We're a rock band, and we decided that [Joyride] was going to be more linear, more focused, more in-your-face than either of the other two albums."

Other than "Runaway Train," which was written a few years prior, all songs were written after Oleander's departure from Universal. Lyrical themes of Joyride revolve often around danger and risk. "Fountain and Vine" also sympathizes for the homeless while "30-60-90" expresses disdain for drug addiction. "Runaway Train" also reflects on Flowers' previous marriage while "Better Luck Next Time" regards his guilt over spending time wastefully. The album was heavily toted as reinforcing Oleander's aggressive side, comparable to later Soundgarden and Sponge; however, it does include two ballads in "Rainy Day" and the aforementioned "Runaway Train"

The photo seen on the album's cover came from established photographer Neil Zlozower who had pictures of his wrecked Mustang for his insurance company. Flowers chose the photo himself, and it likely inspired the album's title which had not prior been established. This artistic theme is carried throughout the album liner notes as well.

Joyride marks the last album before Oleander's unofficial hiatus. In November 2003, drummer Scott Devours left the band to work with Ima Robot. Flowers subsequently began collaborating with The Black Summer Crush.

== Touring and promotion ==
The Runaway Train EP was released in November 2002 and features a demo, an unreleased song, and the "Runaway Train" music video. It was competitively priced.

In March 2003, Oleander traveled to Italy and headlined a special welcome home concert for the 173 Airborne Brigade. In promotion of Joyride, the group also performed on the Rock and Awe Tour. Frontman Thomas Flowers joked in an interview that "On the occasion when nobody shows up, it's the 'Rock and No Draw Tour.' Previous to that it was the 'Turn That Frown Upside Down Tour'." The group also toured with Nickelback in early 2003. On street date, Oleander played a half-hour acoustic concert at Tower Records in Citrus Heights; local radio station KRXQ broadcast the event from the store.

The promotional campaign focused on a retail presence in cities in which "Hands Off the Wheel" was received positively, such as Dallas, Cincinnati, and Minneapolis. A listening party was held exclusively on Budweiser.com from February 28 through March 3 and allowed fans to stream the entire album. Amazon.com also offered a pre-release value-add, where purchasing fans could stream the Runaway Train EP.

Joyride's single, "Hands Off the Wheel," received considerable radio play upon the album's release. The majority of songs also aired on the Power Rock satellite radio station in 2003.

== Reception ==
Professional ratings
Review scores
Source	Rating
Melodic.net	3.5/5 stars
NY Rock	(favorable)
PopMatters	(favorable)
Rolling Stone	3/5 stars

While not as commercially successful or widely recognized as their major label debut, Joyride generally received critical praise. The album sold just under 400,000 copies. Rolling Stone's Karen Bliss described the introductory "Hands Off the Wheel" as "one of those perfect singles, aggressive, penetrating but catchy." Daniel Mitchell of PopMatters declared "While simplicity and copycatting may sound like negative things, often they are not; such is the case with Joyride." He also noted "Off and On" as the album's catchiest track and added that "Oleander is a band at the top of their game."

Bill Ribas of NY Rock showed disgruntlement in the album's similarity to other popular rock groups and its overtly polished sound. However, he commended all four band members and described Joyride as "varied and engaging, and more than enough to get the blood flowing on a cold day." Ribas added, "It's a solid disc that will probably grow on me as time goes by, and might do the same to you."

== Track listing ==
All tracks are written by Thomas Flowers, Doug Eldridge and Ric Ivanisevich.

No.	Title	Length
1.	"Hands Off the Wheel"	3:52
2.	"Don't Break My Fall"	3:15
3.	"Fountain & Vine"	4:12
4.	"30 60 90"	3:56
5.	"Rainy Day"	3:55
6.	"Off & On"	3:40
7.	"Better Luck Next Time"	3:51
8.	"Joyride"	3:21
9.	"King of Good Intentions"	3:58
10.	"Leave It All Behind"	3:31
11.	"Runaway Train"	4:27
Total length:		41:58

== Charts ==
Song	Chart	Peak position	Year
"Hands Off the Wheel"	Billboard Mainstream Rock Tracks	25	2003

== Personnel ==
- Thomas Flowers – vocals, rhythm guitar
- Doug Eldridge – bass guitar
- Ric Ivanisevich – lead guitar
- Scott Devours – drums
- Kaylene Peoples – string arrangements
