= Matthew Duke =

Matthew Duke may refer to:

- Matt Duke (born 1977), English football goalkeeper
- Matt Duke (musician) (born 1985), American musician and singer-songwriter
- Matthew Edward Duke (died 1960), American pilot and smuggler who was gunned down in Cuba
