= The Bird of Peace =

Statue gifted by Richard Nixon to the PRC

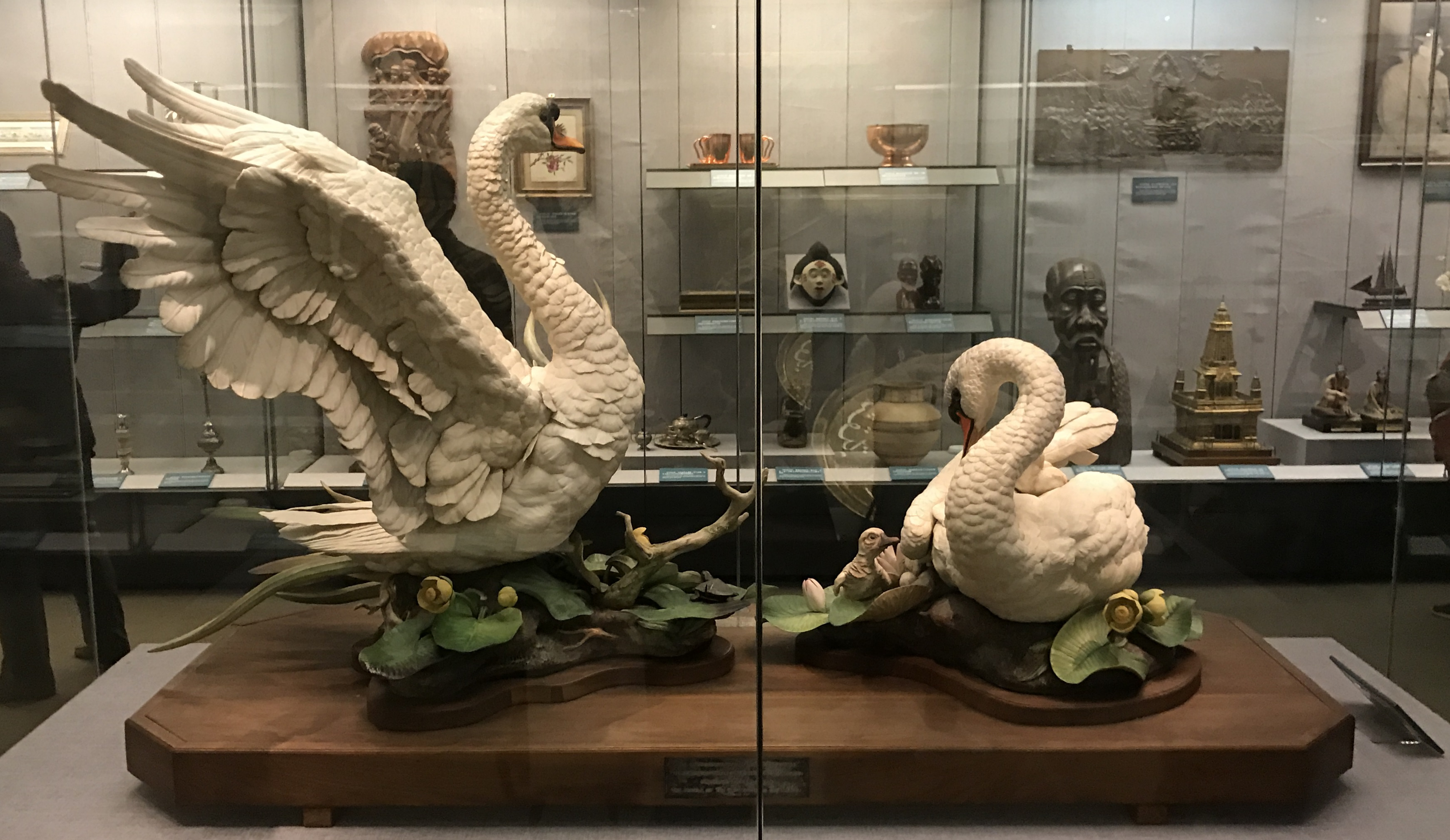
- Artist: Helen Boehm; Maurice Eyeington; E. M. Boehm Studios
- Year: 1971
- Medium: Porcelain statue
- Subject: Mute swans
- Location: National Museum of China

The Bird of Peace (also known as Bird of Peace, Mute Swans) is a porcelain statue of mute swans gifted by Richard Nixon to the People's Republic of China during his 1972 diplomatic visit to the country. The production of the statue was led by Helen Boehm and E. M. Boehm Studios, with design of the statue by head sculptor Maurice Eyeington.

The following dedication is at the base of the statue, inscribed in silver with presidential seal:

To His Excellency Chairman Mao Tse‐tung and the People of the People's Republic of China From President Richard Nixon and the People of the United States of America.

== History ==
=== Nixon and China ===
The swans were originally commissioned by Nixon in 1969 to join his oval office collection of works by Edward Marshall Boehm. Helen Boehm, Edward's widow and operator of his business posthumously, was the organizer of this collection for Nixon. One day, after presenting a selection of 18 porcelain birds for Nixon's choosing (intended as gifts to heads of state for his upcoming NATO tour), he expressed fatigue toward doves and hawks. Helen suggested finding a new bird to be an updated symbol of peace, one with less political baggage than, say, the dove, to which Nixon said, "That's a fine idea."

Helen subsequently wrote to ornithologists around the world, seeking suggestions for what that new peace bird ought to be. Among the responses, and her own research, both gathered over several months, the mute swan was most mentioned, frequently having been cited for its tranquility, even over the traditional dove. Helen, decades later, would express that the mute swan captures "serenity and purity, [and is] a bird that has been associated with peace throughout history and in mythology. [...] The mute swan's range is worldwide; it came to the shores of America during the nineteenth century. Perhaps its most important characteristic is that it speaks with a soft voice."

Boehm and a team of 14 porcelain artists and craftsmen, including head sculptor Maurice Eyeington, then worked for two years to produce the sculpture, using 10 tons of plaster to create the master molds. The sculpture featured a male and female mute swan, three infant swans, and a natural setting of rocks and grass. Formed from roughly 60,000 sculpted lines, it weighed roughly 250 lbs, and stood over 42 inches high on a 3-foot base. The softness and detail in the feathers of the swans make it "hard to believe [they] are made of porcelain".

Upon Boehm notifying the White House of the completion of the statue in 1971, she was asked to make one additional change: because Nixon had decided to present the swans to Mao Zedong as a gift during the U.S President's upcoming visit to China, that a plaque and presidential seal should be added to the statue. This request was fulfilled.

During Nixon's visit the following year, he presented the swans to Premier Zhou Enlai in a gift-giving ceremony, and introduced the sculpture's artist (presumably Helen Boehm).

=== Original copies ===
A total of two other copies were made before the molds were destroyed in 1974.

The first copy, made for the White House Historical Society, was finished in 1975. This copy was later loaned to a six-week exhibit in Russia, which opened May 16, 1987, and was organized by Helen Boehm, Raisa Gorbacheva, Vassili Zakharon (Soviet Minister of Culture), and sponsored by Armand Hammer (longtime friend of Helen). During transit back to the U.S. and upon inspection, the statue was found permanently damaged, with one of the necks severed and the feathers broken into hundreds of pieces. Helen described the situation as "The Peace Birds are in pieces. They're completely busted. I've been crying for two days." The statue was one of 48 damaged in transit. The statue had been packed by Boehm employees, shipped via Lufthansa and Finnair airlines, and arrived at JFK Airport. It was insured for an unknown amount. "One cannot place a value on them. They are priceless because they are not replaceable," Helen remarked.

The second copy was auctioned in 1976 for a wildlife benefit, selling for $150,000. The donor subsequently gifted the statue to the Vatican. At the time, this was the highest price paid for a porcelain sculpture.

== Present day ==
Today, the original statue of swans resides at the State Gifts exhibit in the National Museum of China, viewable behind a glass box to museum visitors. The only other extant copy remains in the Vatican City.
