= Massee Lane Gardens =

Botanical gardens in Fort Valley, Georgia, USA

Coordinates: 32°29′20″N 83°54′36″W

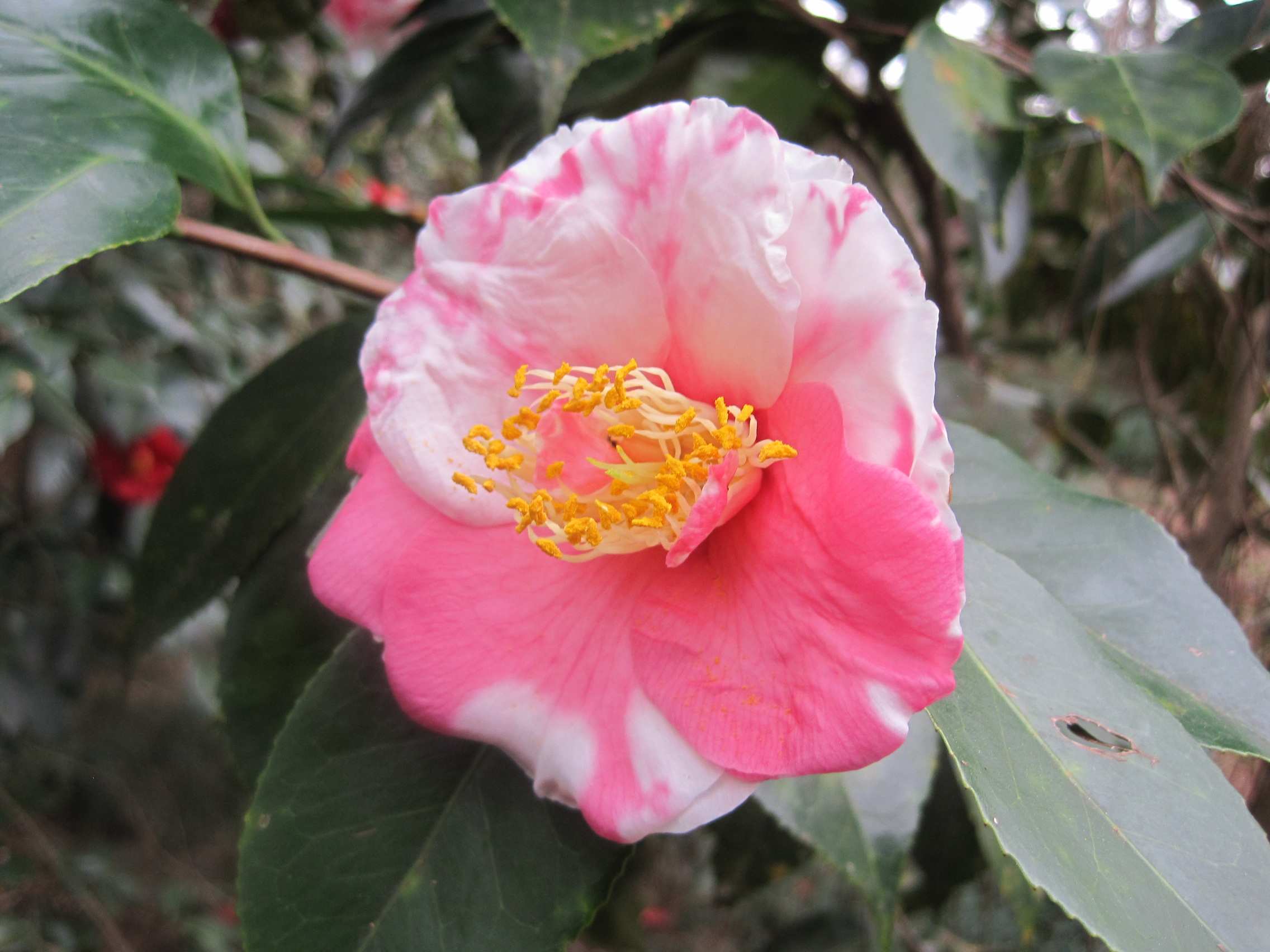
- Camellia in bloom in the gardens.
- Interactive map of Massee Lane Gardens

Massee Lane Gardens (9 acres) are botanical gardens focusing on camellias, located at the American Camellia Society headquarters, 100 Massee Lane, Fort Valley, Georgia. They are open to the public for an admission fee.

The gardens were originally created by David C. Strother in the 1930s within the 160-acre (0.65 km^{2}) property around his farm house. In 1966, he donated his property to the American Camellia Society. Its headquarters building was completed in 1968 and named in his honor. The T. J. Smith Memorial Greenhouse was constructed in 1969, and now houses some 200 camellia plants.

Today the gardens contain more than 1,000 varieties of camellia, as well as the Abendroth Japanese Garden with tea house and koi fish, the Environmental Garden featuring plants native to the southeastern United States, the Scheibert Rose Garden with more than 150 roses, and plantings of azaleas, chrysanthemums, daffodils, daphnes, daylilies, and more.

The Annabelle Lundy Fetterman Educational Museum in the visitor center features a large collection of Boehm porcelain. The visitor center also includes a slide show about the gardens, a gift shop, auditorium and reception room.

== Gallery ==
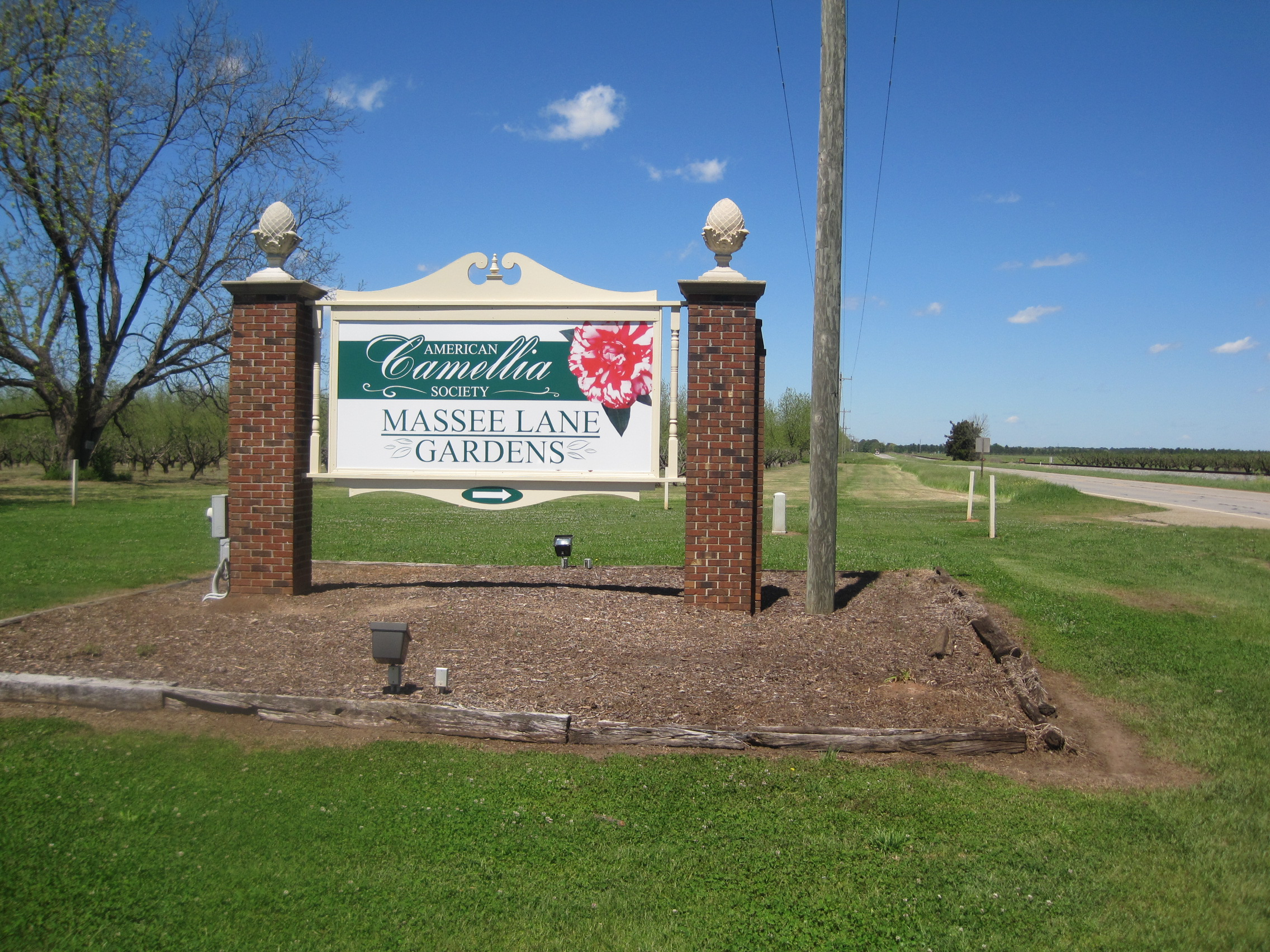
Roadsign along Georgia state Highway 49

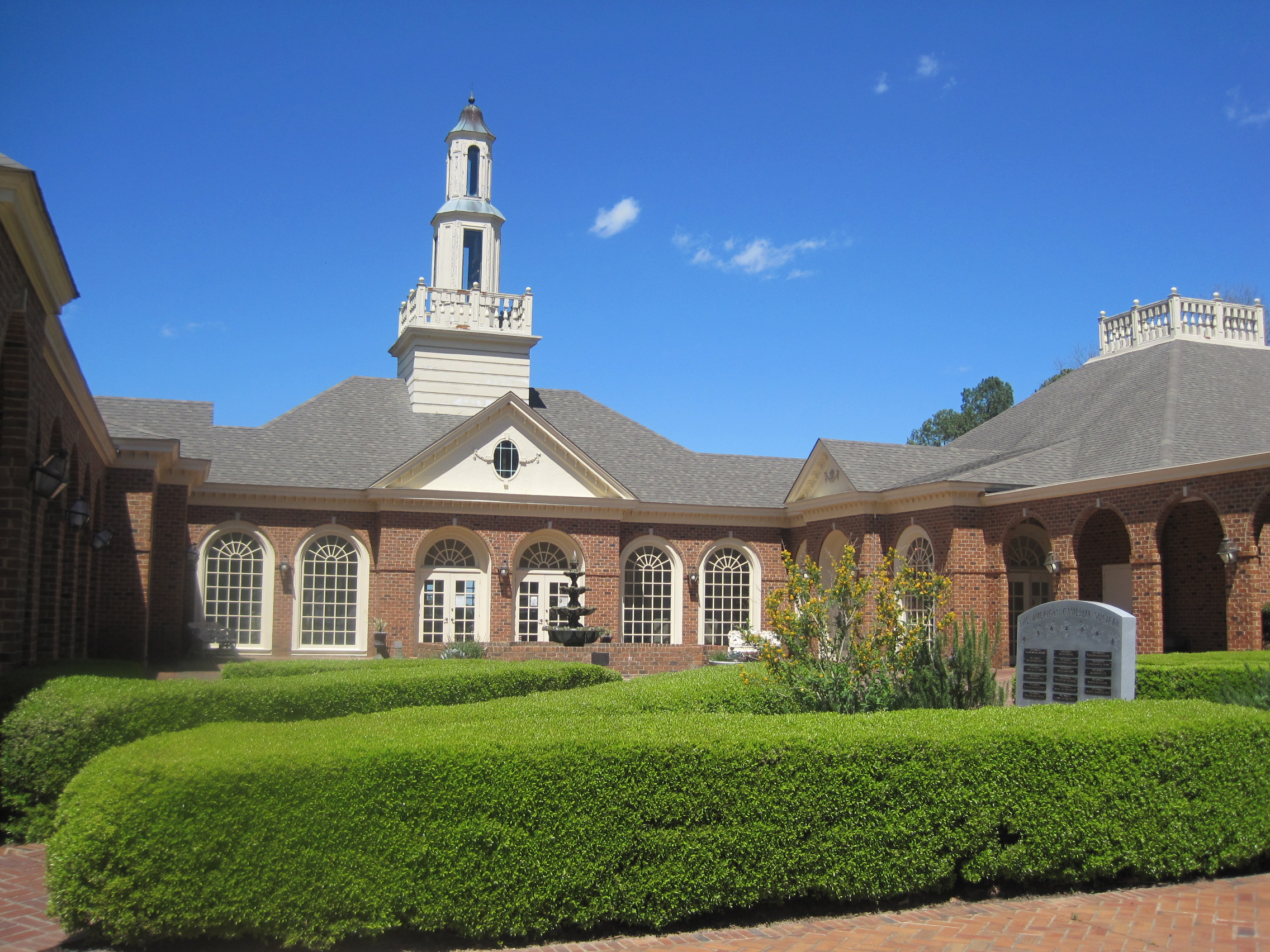
Massee Lane visitor center with gift shop

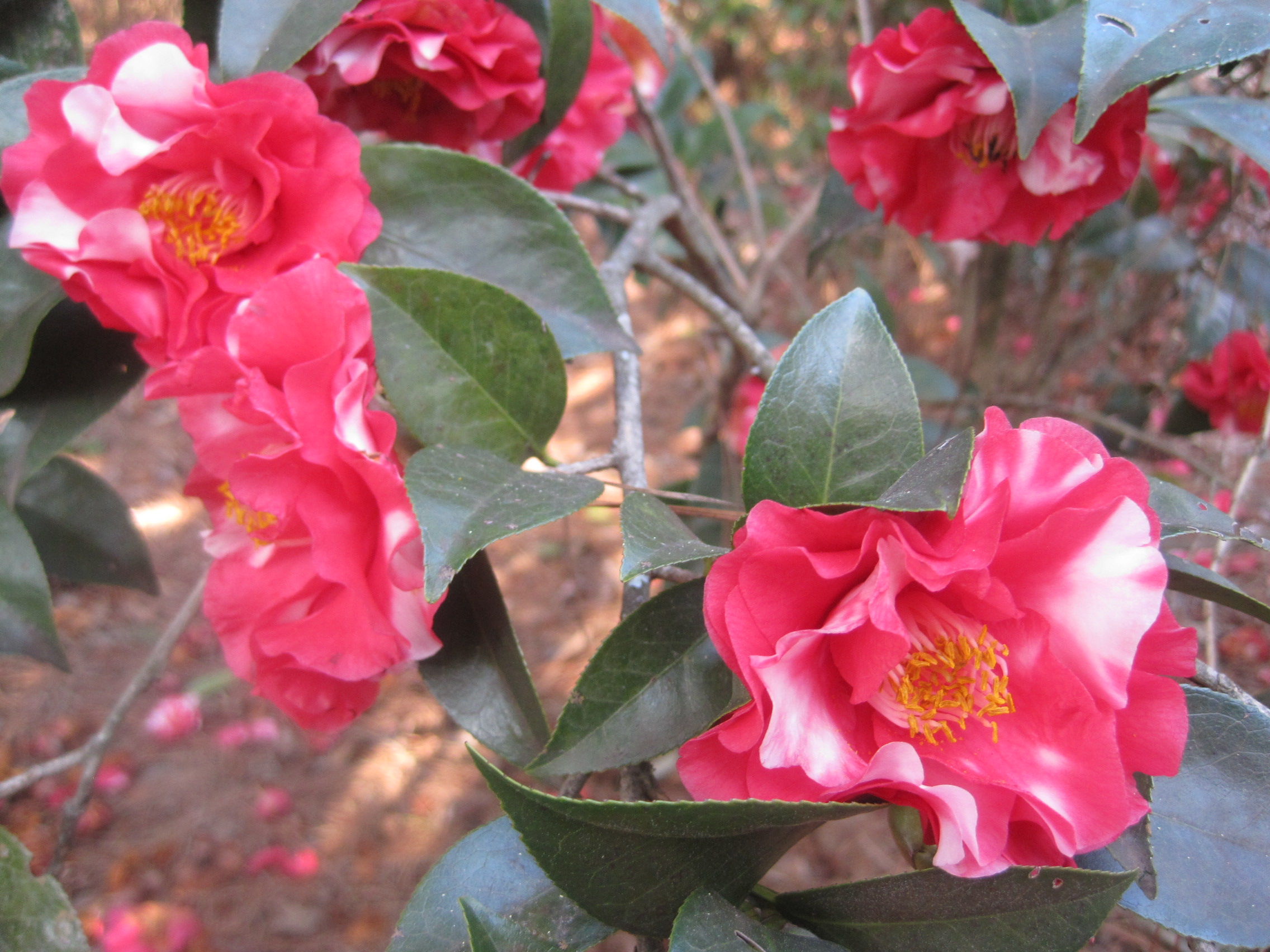
Camellia japonica 'Monjusu'

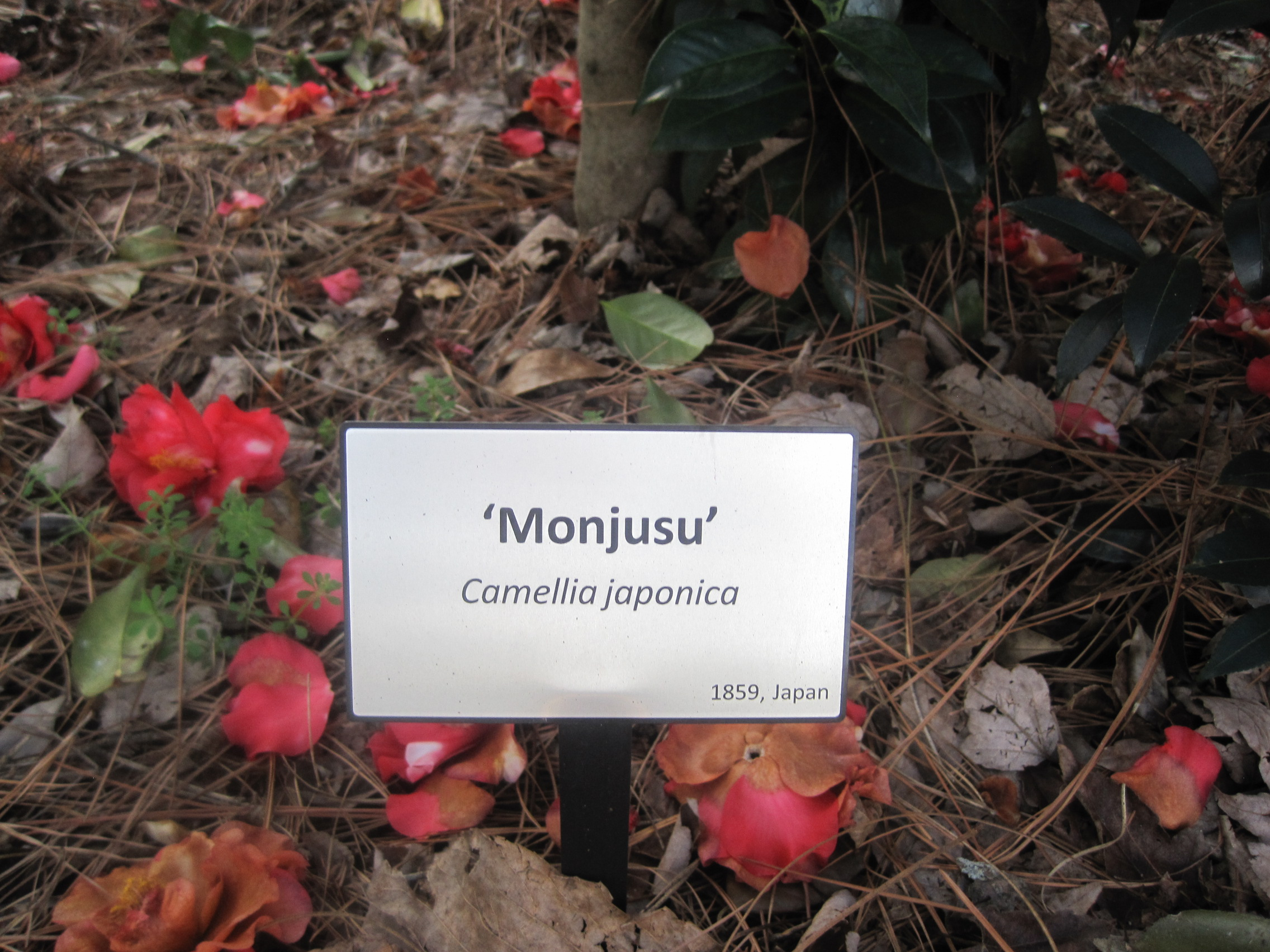
Identification signs below the camellias show when and where the cultivar originated

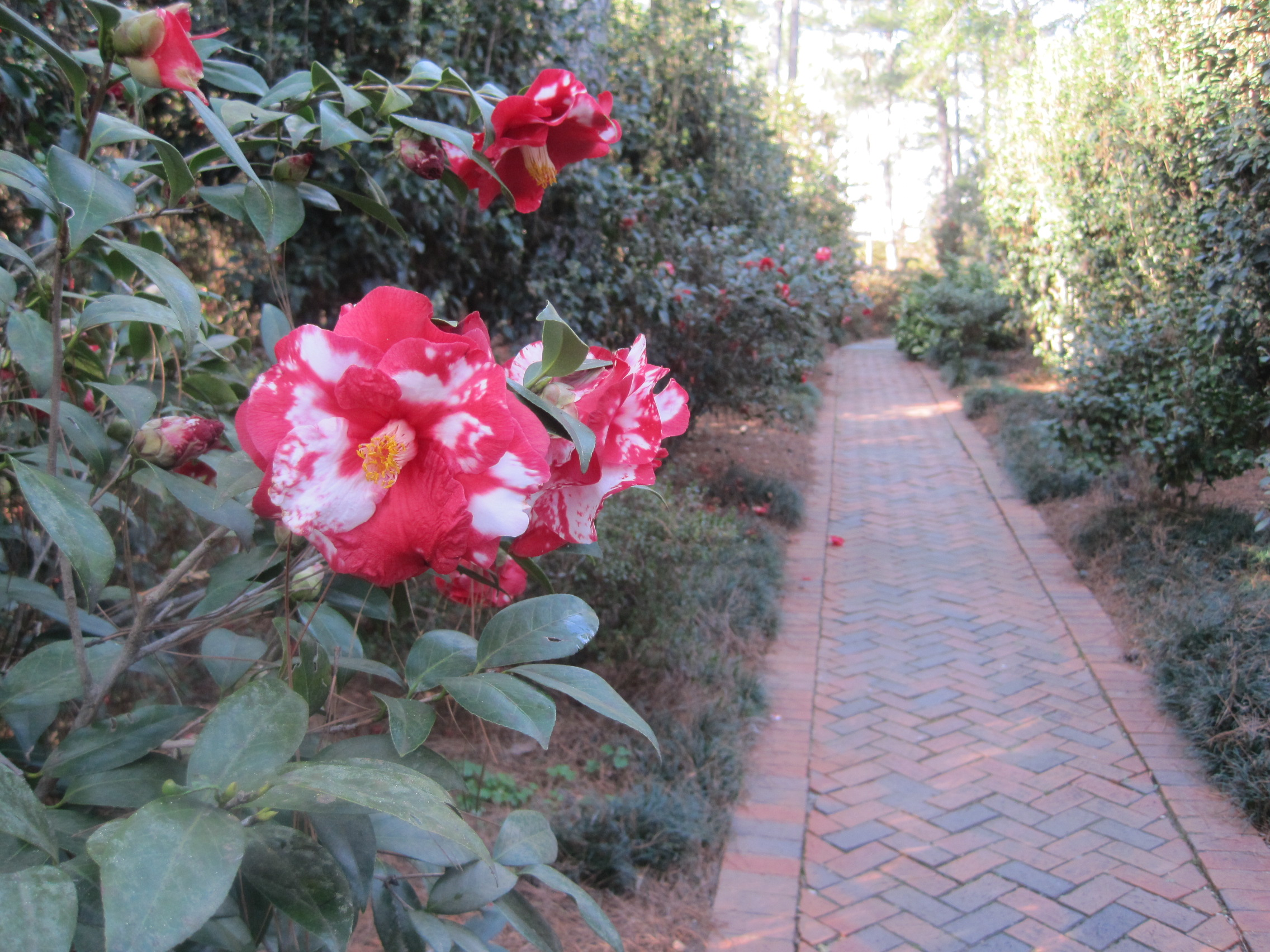
Brick pathway for viewing camellias

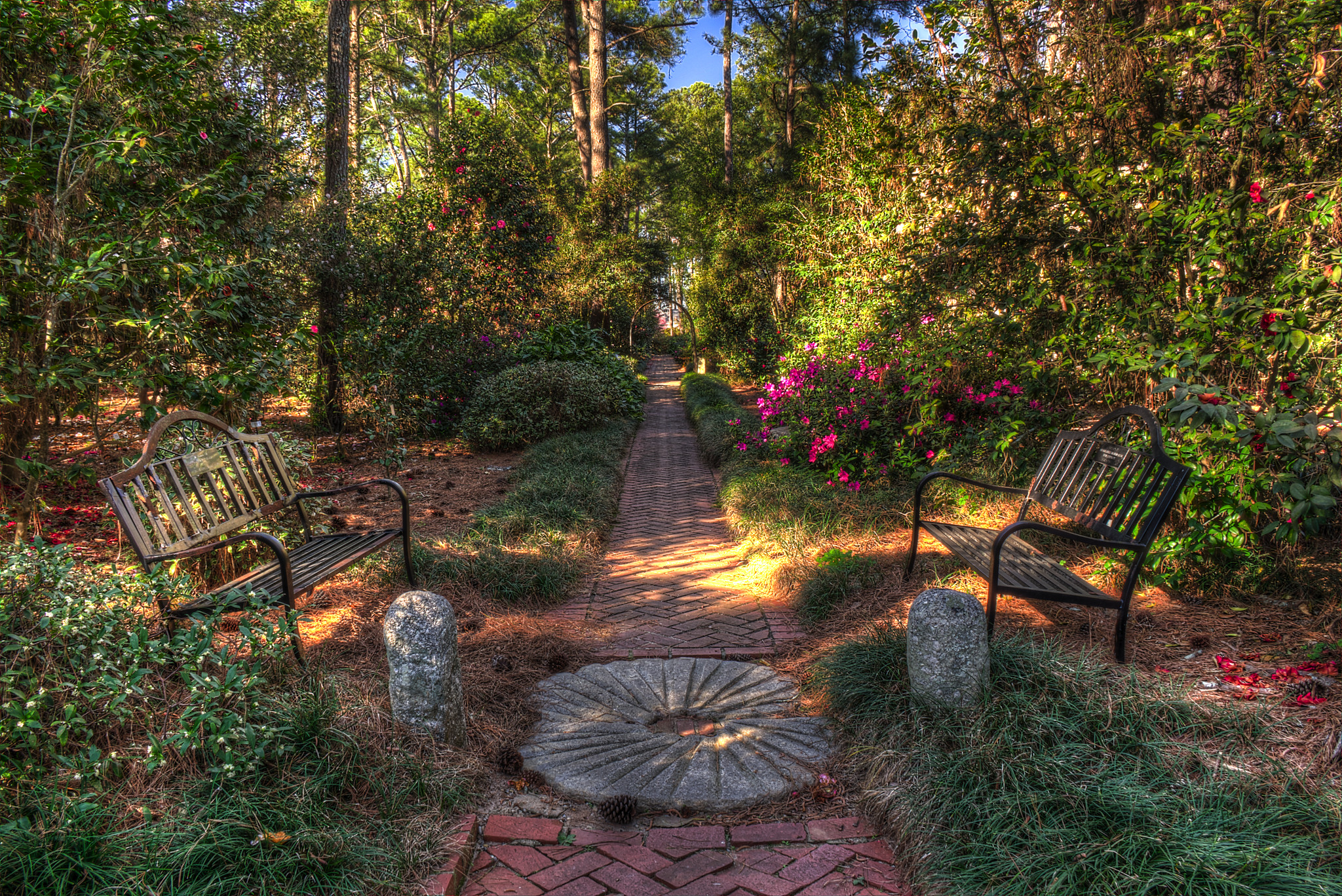
detail of pathway

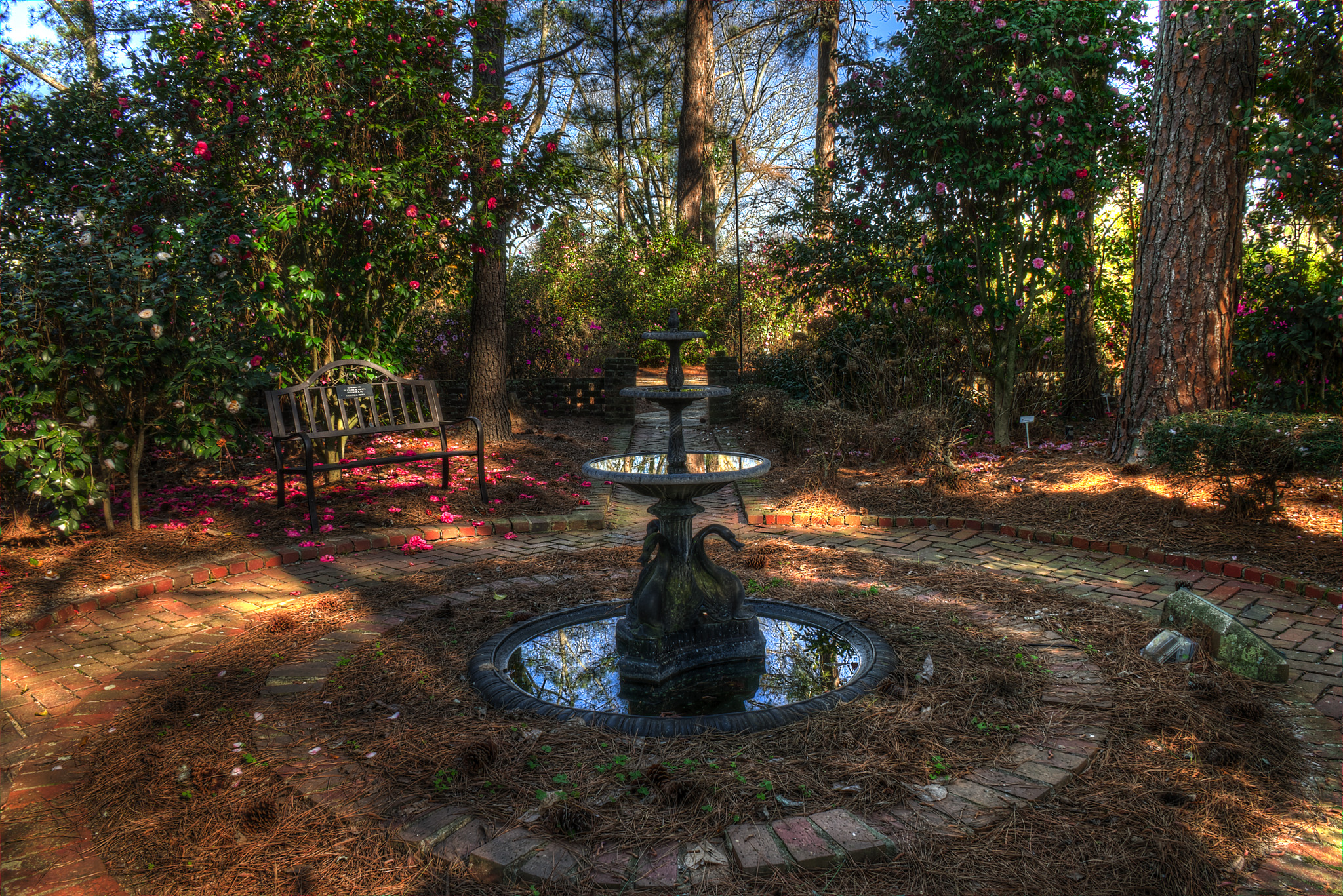
detail of fountain

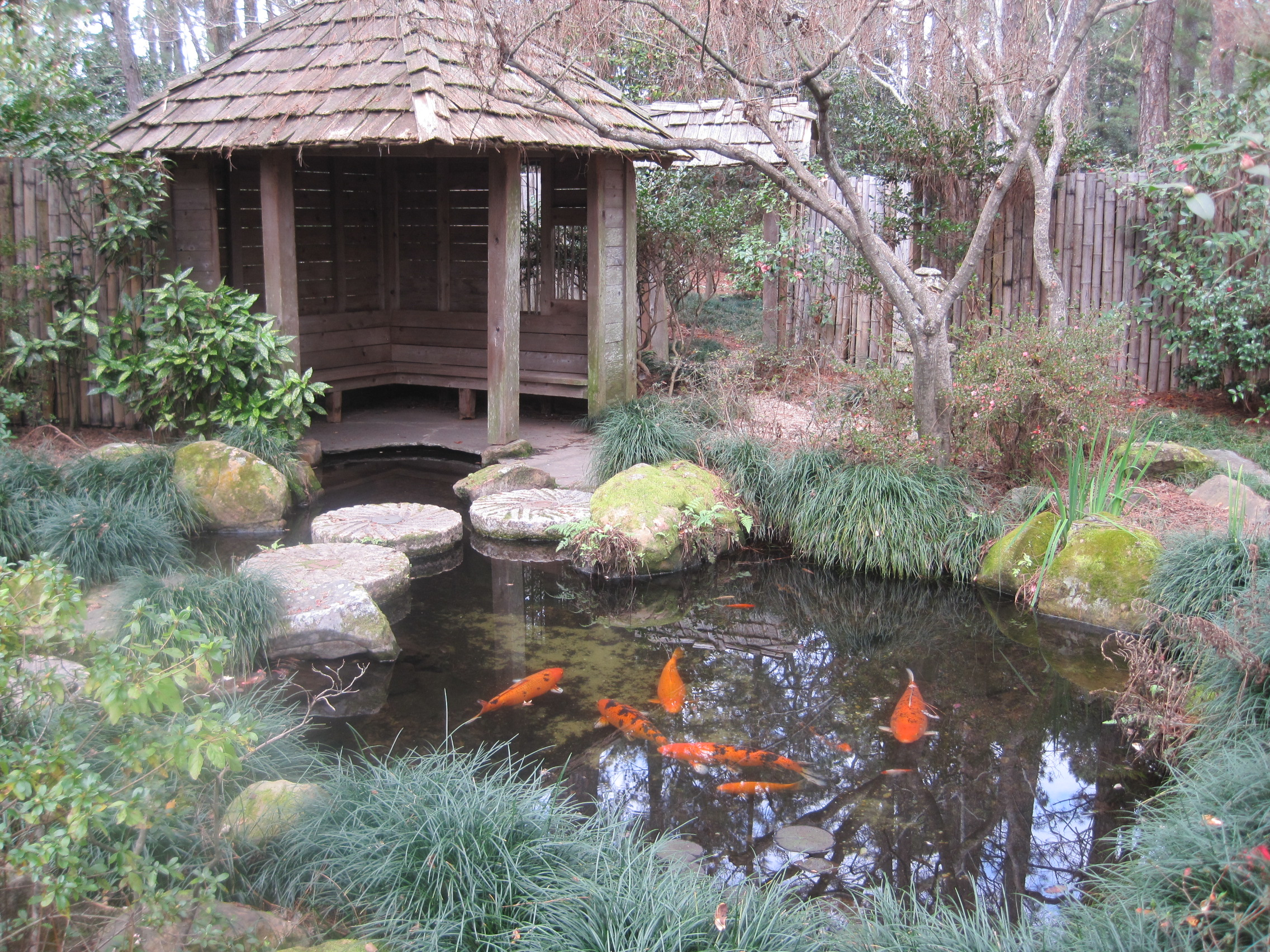
Abendroth Japanese Garden

== See also ==
- List of botanical gardens in the United States
