= Unwind (Oleander album) =

Studio album by Oleander
- Released: March 6, 2001
- Recorded: 2000
- Genre: Post-grunge
- Length: 43:07
- Label: Universal
- Producer: Rich Mouser

Oleander chronology
February Son (1999)	Unwind (2001)	Runaway Train EP (2002)

Singles from Unwind
- 1. "Are You There?" Released: 2001; 2. "Champion" Released: 2001; 3. "Halo" Released: 2001

Unwind is the third studio album by American rock band Oleander. It was released on March 6, 2001, through Universal Records. The band's second release on Universal, the album sold approximately 250,000 copies. The album is noted for displaying both a wider range and softer music than its predecessor. It features three singles, "Are You There?," "Champion," "Halo," as well as "Jimmy Shaker Day," a re-recording of a song from their 1997 debut Shrinking the Blob.

== Musical style ==
Prior to its release, vocalist Thomas Flowers described Unwind as being harder than its predecessor yet more diverse with "some extra instrumentation that doesn't make it too hardcore." Oleander also reunited with producer Richard Mouser, who the band's independent debut, Shrinking the Blob, released in 1997. Bassist Doug Eldridge described how the band wanted Mouser for their major label debut, but he wasn't available. He added, "[Mouser]'s always been kind of a founding member of this band in a way because, when we were no ones, he took us to another level."

== Promotion and touring ==
Oleander premiered their Macromedia Flash website in promotion of Unwind, which boasted a more interactive structure and track samples from the upcoming album. On the eve of its March 6 release, the band participated in an online chat on GetMusic.com.

The lead single, "Are You There?," made its radio debut in early 2001 and became the most added track in active rock, album rock, and alternative. Regarding the band's choice for a lead single, Doug Eldridge noted "[The song] is a little heavier, and we wanted to go back to rock radio and kind of re-establish ourselves back there, where our roots are, and where 'Why I'm Here' did so well." Marc Webb directed a music video for the song that depicts what Thomas Flowers described as "a skater chick who sneaks out of the house and makes her way to an Oleander show."

"Champion" became a hit single and a symbol of the sacrifice of firefighters during the September 11, 2001 attacks in New York City. Profit made from the single also went to those effected by the event. However, in a May 2003 interview, Flowers stated:

"Our intentions definitely were good to submit something to the relief fund. The only sad thing about it is, unfortunately, later on, I saw them for like, 25 cents a copy -- I see them on eBay for like a penny. I'm like, 'Man how much is really going to [the fund],' you know? It just didn't fly, and it was endemic of that whole album actually."

The song "Halo" was included in the soundtrack of the film American Pie 2. Another song recorded during the Unwind sessions, "Bruised," was also featured in the aforementioned film but not included on the soundtrack. The song's rights are held by Universal and it has consequently never been officially released. However, guitarist Ric Ivanisevich, the song's writer, has sent it to people and encouraged that fans who possess "Bruised" share it online. The title of the song "Jimmy Shaker Day" is from a line in the 1996 Ron Howard thriller film Ransom starting Mel Gibson and Rene Russo; the line is spoken by actor Gary Sinise's character James "Jimmy" Shaker in one of the last climactic scenes of the film.

Oleander performed with 3 Doors Down and Fuel to promote Unwind in early 2001. This included a benefit concert for the Upper Chattahoochee Riverkeeper Fund in Atlanta. From September through November 2001, the group joined Tantric and Beautiful Creatures on the first Rolling Rock Town Fair.

== Reception ==
Professional ratings
Review scores
Source	Rating
AllMusic	3/5 stars
CANOE	(unfavorable)
Melodic	3.5/5 stars
PopMatters	(favorable)

Despite generally favorable critical reaction, the follow-up to Oleander's popular debut, Unwind couldn't match the success of February Son; although, sales managed close at 400,000 copies. Andrew Ellis of PopMatters offered the album praise, stating "Unwind is an extremely solid and enjoyable album that serves as an antidote to some of the more polished and considered modern rock being released these days. It is also a much more mature and well-written effort than February Son, displaying a pleasing balance between full-on rock tendencies and more subtle but no less powerful moments."

Jon Stoeckley of AllMusic cited the band's talent with melody but added that only through multiple listens do the songs of Unwind take distinction, which may cause a premature jumping point with frustrated fans. "After a few turns, it becomes apparent that Flowers and his bandmates do have a definite craft and they aren't being sheer poseurs, but the obstacle still lies in the fact that they have yet to develop a signature sound, or at the very least something that is associated only with Oleander itself." Stoeckley followed up in proposing that if Oleander would be able to shape their own sound, fans could "expect much greater things from them in the future."

Unwind received one overwhelmingly negative review from CANOE. Critic Darryl Sterdan claimed "There's no good reason in the world to like Oleander's third album. . . This Sacramento outfit shamelessly bandwagon-jumps practically every guitar-rock trend of the past decade on this disc."

Perhaps to due poor reception of longtime fans, the band itself has since shown distaste for Unwind. Noting the disappointing sales of the album, Thomas Flowers recalled, "the phone calls stopped coming in, the promo people stopped putting posters up -- priorities obviously shifted." He has also detailed the arguably mishandled approach with Unwind:

"Once we came away with the success of February Son, we kind of fell into the trap that a lot of bands do that have success with their first one, who think 'Well, we're just going to do it again -- let's go platinum this time.' We attempted to broaden the scope of what we were putting out there. Instead of just putting out rock songs, we had other types of music that we were exploring and we tried to put out a broader plain of music. That made it a little bit more difficult for people to get their head around it -- especially if they were into the rock and roll aspect of this band."

Guitarist Ric Ivanisevich also stated in a 2003 interview, "People could get the wrong impression of our music when they hear Unwind. They might think we are a lot wimpier live than we actually are." He added, "The songs on Unwind are too far from each other, lyrically and musically. The album just doesn't make sense, but that's okay because we were a little mixed up when we were writing it."

== Track listing ==
All tracks are written by Thomas Flowers, Doug Eldridge and Ric Ivanisevich.

No.	Title	Length
1.	"Come to Stay"	3:49
2.	"Yours If You Like"	3:26
3.	"Are You There?"	4:20
4.	"Halo"	4:41
5.	"Benign"	4:11
6.	"Unwind"	2:50
7.	"Goodbye"	4:04
8.	"Jimmy Shaker Day"	3:31
9.	"Back Home Years Ago"	4:14
10.	"Tightrope"	5:12
11.	"She's Up, She's Down"	4:03
12.	"Champion"	2:57
Total length:		43:07

== Personnel ==
- Thomas Flowers – vocals, rhythm guitar
- Doug Eldridge – bass guitar
- Ric Ivanisevich – lead guitar
- Scott Devours – drums
- Kaylene Peoples – string arrangements

== Charts ==
=== Album ===
Chart	Peak position	Year
Billboard 200	94	2001

=== Singles ===
Song	Chart	Peak position	Year
"Are You There?"	Billboard Mainstream Rock Tracks	6	2001
"Are You There?"	Billboard Modern Rock Tracks	19	2001
"Champion"	Billboard Hot 100 Singles Sales	116	2001
