= Bang Bang You're Dead (film) =

2002 American thriller TV film

- Film poster
- Genre: Thriller drama
- Based on: Bang Bang You're Dead by William Mastrosimone
- Written by: William Mastrosimone
- Directed by: Guy Ferland
- Starring: Tom Cavanagh; Ben Foster; Randy Harrison; Janel Moloney
- Music by: Reinhold Heil; Johnny Klimek
- Country of origin: United States
- Original language: English

Production
- Executive producers: William Mastrosimone; Norman Stephens
- Producers: Paul Hellerman; Deboragh Gabler
- Cinematography: Robert Aschmann
- Editor: Jill Savitt
- Running time: 93 minutes
- Production companies: Viacom Productions; Jersey Guys Productions; Legacy Filmworks

Original release
- Network: Showtime
- Release: October 13, 2002

Bang Bang You're Dead is a 2002 American thriller drama television film directed by Guy Ferland and written by William Mastrosimone. It stars Tom Cavanagh, Ben Foster, Randy Harrison, and Janel Moloney. Based on Mastrosimone's 1999 play, the film is not a direct adaptation; it follows a troubled high school student played by Foster who participates in his school's production of the play while attempting to avoid going down the same path as the play's lead character.

The film premiered at the Seattle International Film Festival on June 7, 2002, and aired on Showtime on October 13, 2002.

== Plot ==
16-year-old Trevor Adams attends an American high school where he is one of the outcasts harassed and humiliated by the school's jocks. He made a false threat to bomb the school a few months ago, narrowly escaping expulsion. Since then, Trevor has been trying to fit back in to normal high school life. He joined a theater group and has been chosen to star in a school play about school shootings called Bang Bang You're Dead as the main character, Josh. After parents and the community hear of the play and its lead actor, they call for it to be canceled.

But Trevor's theater activity, alone, is not sufficient to let off the steam of his boiling resentment. Using his video camera, he has been documenting bullying at school, creating a "diary of violence".

Trevor and his friends Sean, Mark and Kurt, make plans to storm the school with guns and kill as many of the hated athletes as possible. Trevor meets Jenny, also 16, who stays by him and stands up for him. Through her, Trevor begins to doubt whether the act he plans is right.

In the end, he is the only one to realize that bloodshed only fuels more violence and hatred, and evacuates the school with his art teacher, Mr. Duncan. At the last minute, Trevor prevents bloodshed by overwhelming Kurt, Sean and Mark.

The film ends with the play premiering successfully, despite the initial protests of the students' parents.

== Cast ==
- Tom Cavanagh as Mr. Val Duncan
- Ben Foster as Trevor Adams
- Randy Harrison as Sean
- Janel Moloney as Ellie Milford
- Jane McGregor as Jenny Dahlquist
- David Paetkau as Brad Larkin
- Garry Chalk as Chief Bud McGee
- Eric Johnson as Mark Kentworth
- Kristian Ayre as Kurt
- Brent Glenen as Zach
- Gillian Barber as Principal Meyer
- Andrew Sabiston as Mr. Olson
- Eric Keenleyside as Bob Adams
- Glynis Davies as Karen Adams
- Fred Henderson as Dan Dahlquist
- P. Lynn Johnson as Tanya Dahlquist
- Richard de Klerk as Jessie
- Steven Grayhm as Michael
- Mark Holden as Officer Willow

== Promotion ==
The song "Runaway Train" by post-grunge band Oleander was featured in the film. A music video for the song was then shot and incorporated footage from the film. On November 19, 2002 the band released their Runaway Train EP. The film was released on DVD on January 27, 2004 without any special features.

== Awards ==
Year	Award	Title	Recipient	Result
2002	Nantucket Film Festival; Audience Award	Best Feature	Guy Ferland; William Mastrosimone	Won
2003	Peabody Award	Area of Excellence	Showtime Networks Inc., in association with Viacom Productions Inc., and A Jersey Guys Production	Won
2003	Directors Guild of America Award	Outstanding Directorial Achievement in Children's Programs	Guy Ferland	Won
2003	Daytime Emmy Award	Outstanding Children's Special	William Mastrosimone; Norman Stephens; Paul Hellerman; Deboragh Gabler	Won
2003	Daytime Emmy Award	Outstanding Directing in a Children's Special	Guy Ferland	Won
2003	Daytime Emmy Award	Outstanding Performer in a Children's Special	Ben Foster	Won
2003	Daytime Emmy Award	Outstanding Writing in a Children's Special	William Mastrosimone	Won
2003	Daytime Emmy Award	Outstanding Performer in a Children's Special	Tom Cavanagh	Nominated
