= Trenton F.C. =

Trenton F.C. was an early twentieth century amateur U.S. soccer team based in Trenton, New Jersey.

== History ==
The club had a brief period of national exposure in the second half of the 1920s. In 1926, it qualified for the 1926 National Challenge Cup, but lost in the first round. Trenton qualified for the next three cups, exiting in the second round in 1927, first round in 1928 and the second round in 1929. In 1927-1928, a newspaper article mentions that the team played in the National League. However, the name “National League” was commonly used for minor, local amateur leagues at the time. Its only known player was Albert Cooper who was a member of the U.S. soccer team at the 1928 Summer Olympics.
