= Hervey Studdiford Moore Sr. =

American politician

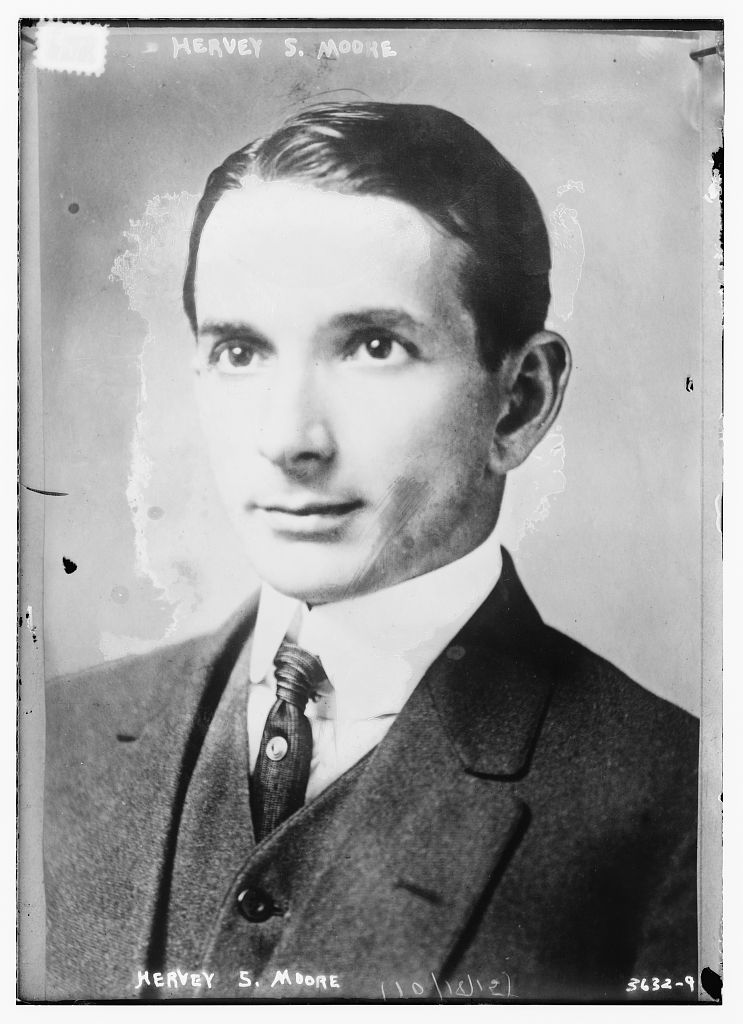
Hervey Studdiford Moore Sr. circa 1912

Hervey Studdiford Moore Sr. (October 14, 1884 – December 11, 1947) was a member of the New Jersey General Assembly representing Mercer County, New Jersey in 1913 through 1914 and again in 1919.

== Biography ==
He was born in Trenton, New Jersey on October 14, 1884, to Mary R. Bradley and William Randolph Moore. He attended Trenton Central High School, the University of Pennsylvania and Georgetown University.

He married Lillian Mary Field and they had Hervey Studdiford Moore Jr. (1916-1995).

He died on December 11, 1947, in Trenton, New Jersey. He was buried in First Presbyterian Church of Ewing Cemetery in Ewing, New Jersey.
