= Oleander (band) =

American rock band

- Origin: Sacramento, California, U.S.
- Genres: Post-grunge; alternative rock
- Years active: 1995–2004; 2008–present
- Labels: Fine; Universal; Sanctuary; Carved
- Members: Thomas Flowers; Doug Eldridge; Ric Ivanisevich; Steve Brown; Rich Mouser
- Past members: Chuck Combs; Fred Nelson Jr. Jonathan Mover; Scott Devours
- Website: www.oleander.net

Oleander is an American rock band formed in Sacramento, California, in 1995. Its name is derived from the poisonous flowering shrub oleander, which line the highways of Northern California. In their nine years of activity, the band released four studio albums under various record labels. Their most successful effort, 1999's February Son, includes the hit single "Why I'm Here." Oleander went on official hiatus after the release and promotion of their third album, Joyride, in 2004. The band took some time off, but reunited in 2008, and began work on their album Something Beautiful, which was released on April 16, 2013.

In 2025, Chad Childers of Loudwire included the band in his list of "10 '90s Post-Grunge Bands That Should Have Been Bigger".

== Career ==
=== 1995–2004 ===
In 1989, singer and guitarist Thomas Flowers met bassist Doug Eldridge; both of whom were employees of a Sacramento eatery. They played with several local bands together before meeting guitarist Ric Ivanisevich who joined them in a rehearsal. Chuck Combs, the original drummer left, leaving the position to Fred Nelson Jr, a co-worker of Flowers' and Eldridge's. The quartet formed Oleander in 1995 and soon released an eponymous EP on the indie label Fine Records. This would be followed by a full-length album, Shrinking the Blob, in 1997.

The band then gave their CD to a friend who worked at 98-Rock KRXQ who began playing two of their songs on air. The track "Down When I'm Loaded" gradually became a regional hit, and after opening for Sugar Ray, Oleander was approached by a representative of Republic Records. Soon after, they signed with Universal and began re-recording their 1997 studio album.

During this time, session drummer Jonathan Mover was recruited in the studio to record a new album and play live for the first leg of that tour. Nelson later joined the tour but subsequently left the band and was replaced with Scott Devours. In 1999, Oleander released their major label debut titled February Son. The album featured the hit singles "Why I'm Here" and "I Walk Alone." The former was even featured in the popular TV series Dawson's Creek. In promotion of the album, Oleander also participated in Woodstock '99 and their music was featured in American Pie and Scary Movie. The American Forces Radio Network in Asia and Europe also quickly jumped on February Son, which led to a following overseas.

Oleander recorded a cover of "Hello, I Love You" for Stoned Immaculate: The Music of The Doors, a tribute album released in November 2000.

The band released their second official album, Unwind, in 2001. Their major label sophomore effort included the hit song "Are You There?". "Champion" became a theme about the sacrifice of firefighters during the September 11, 2001 attacks in New York City. The profits made off its single would be donated to aid the victims. During this time, the song "Bruised" was featured exclusively in American Pie 2. "Jimmy Shaker Day" was featured in the 2002 blockbuster Spider-Man. Unwind found considerable success but could not match the popularity of the band's previous album. It also gained both criticism and praise for its more varied musical style.

In 2002, Oleander parted ways with Universal and moved to Sanctuary. Their song "Runaway Train" was featured in the Showtime film Bang Bang You're Dead in November that year. A music video was then shot and incorporated footage from the movie, which led to the Runaway Train EP. By March 2003, Oleander released their third major label album, Joyride. Considered a return to the straight forward, hard rock approach, the album featured the marginally popular single "Hands Off the Wheel." Oleander traveled to Vicenza, Italy in March and headlined a special welcome home concert for the 173rd Airborne Brigade.

In November, 2003, drummer Devours issued a statement announcing he was leaving Oleander to join the band Ima Robot. The decision was amicable and, in 2004, the band went into an unofficial hiatus. During that time, vocalist Thomas Flowers co-founded the band Black Summer Crush with Rival Sons guitarist Scott Holiday and drummer, J. Harley Gilmore. Flowers later told Alternative Addiction, "We toured relentlessly, we had done anything that was ever asked of us and more by the record labels, and the payoff was diminishing. So we made a conscious decision to get back to normal life."

=== 2008–present ===
On May 21, 2008, an official Oleander Myspace was created. On August 6 of that year, it was reported that Black Summer Crush had parted ways with vocalist Thomas Flowers, immediately stirring rumor that Flowers might reunite with his former Oleander bandmates. The official Myspace page also revealed a band lineup including drummer Steve Brown (who had previously played with the band Jet Red), and links to OleanderForums.net, a small, fan-run site claiming that the group was indeed reunited and working on a new album.

In April 2009 Facebook and Twitter accounts were created for Oleander, and new information was brought forth regarding the band's alleged reuniting; on AlternativeAddiction.com, Thomas Flowers revealed that by late 2008, he began writing new songs for Oleander and finally got the group together for rehearsal. "I just picked up a guitar and started thinking about the guys, and the places we’ve been and the people we’ve met, and the music that we left behind. There was just so much left that I wanted to say and that I wanted to write." Regarding the new material's style, he also elaborated that it will "retain all the elements of Oleander's musical past" but also reflect the band "where [they] are today, both lyrically, melodically, and sonically." Flowers also expressed his desire to finish the record, which was funded entirely by the band, before touring despite various offers.

Oleander took to the stage on August 21, 2010 at The Boardwalk in Orangevale California. Soon after, Flowers announced hopes to release the band's new album by spring 2011 under a major label and with a supporting US tour to follow. Oleander also leaked its first single, "Daylight," to radio stations during this time.

In March 2011, Richard Mouser, who also produced Shrinking the Blob and Unwind, started mixing the new record.

The new single called "Fight" was to be released November, 2011. An instrumental version was used in official videos for THQ's WWE '12 video game and served as the official theme song of the game. On November 18, 2011 Oleander performed in front of Madison Square Garden live as a part of the WWE's pre Survivor Series party which promoted the subsequent release of WWE 12.

In 2012 Oleander signed with Carved Records to release their album 'Something Beautiful' which contained promo singles "Daylight" and "Fight!" and their newest single "Something Beautiful". Pre-sale for the album began on March 26, and the album was released on April 16, 2013, with a release party that took place at Ace of Spades in Sacramento, California.

On July 3rd, 2026, Oleander released a single titled "Fourth of July" on Spotify, Youtube, and Instagram.

== Members ==
Current

- Thomas Flowers – lead vocals (1995–2004, 2008–present), rhythm guitar (1995–2004)
- Doug Eldridge – bass guitar (1995–2004, 2008–present)
- Ric Ivanisevich – lead guitar (1995–2003, 2008–present)
- Steve Brown – drums, percussion (2003–2004, 2008–present)
- Rich Mouser – rhythm guitar (2008–present)

Former

- Chuck Combs – drums, percussion (1995)
- Fred Nelson, Jr. – drums, percussion (1995–1998, 1999)
- Jonathan Mover – drums, percussion (1998–1999)
- Scott Devours – drums, percussion (1999–2003)

== Discography ==
=== Studio albums ===
Year	Album details	Peak chart positions		Certifications (sales thresholds)
Year	Album details	US	US Heat.	Certifications (sales thresholds)
1997	Shrinking the Blob: Released: July 29, 1997; Label: Fine; Format: CD	—	—	
1999	February Son: Released: February 23, 1999; Label: Universal Republic; Format: CD	115	1	US: Gold
2001	Unwind: Released: March 6, 2001; Label: Universal Republic; Format: CD	94	—	400,000+
2003	Joyride: Released: March 4, 2003; Label: Sanctuary; Format: CD	—	—	Just Under 400,000
2013	Something Beautiful: Released: April 16, 2013; Label: Carved; Format: CD	—	—	
"—" denotes a release that did not chart.

=== Extended plays ===
Year	EP details
1996	Oleander: Released: 1996; Label: Fine; Format: CD
2002	Runaway Train EP: Released: November 19, 2002; Label: Sanctuary; Format: CD

=== Singles ===
Year	Song	Peak chart positions					Album
Year	Song	US	US Active Rock	US Alt.	US Heritage Rock	US Main.	Album
1999	"Why I'm Here"^{[A]}	107	2	13	7	3	February Son
1999	"I Walk Alone"	—	25	37	22	24	February Son
2000	"Boys Don't Cry"	—	—	—	—	—	February Son
2001	"Are You There?"	—	6	19	15	6	Unwind
2001	"Champion"^{[B]}	116	—	—	—	—	Unwind
2001	"Halo"	—	—	—	—	—	Unwind
2003	"Hands Off the Wheel"	—	25	—	29	25	Joyride
2010	"Daylight"	—	—	—	—	—	Something Beautiful
2011	"Fight!" (featuring Urijah Faber)	—	—	—	—	—	Something Beautiful
2013	"Something Beautiful"	—	—	—	—	—	Something Beautiful
2026	"Fourth of July"						
"—" denotes a release that did not chart.

== Notes ==
- A. "Why I'm Here" did not enter the Billboard Hot 100, but peaked at number 7 on the Bubbling Under Hot 100 Singles chart, which acts as a 25-song extension to the Hot 100.
- B. "Champion" did not enter the Billboard Hot 100, but peaked at number 16 on the Hot 100 Singles Sales chart.
