= Jack Kraynick =

American football player (1914–1943)

- Kraynick, c. 1943

North Carolina Tar Heels
- Position: Back

Personal information
- Born: September 2, 1914; Trenton, New Jersey, U.S.
- Died: c. October 31, 1943 (aged 29)
- Listed height: 6 ft 2 in (1.88 m)
- Listed weight: 180 lb (82 kg)

Career information
- High school: Trenton Central (NJ); Staunton Military (VA)
- College: North Carolina (1935–1938)

Other information
- Military career
- Allegiance: United States Army Air Forces
- Service years: 1941–1943
- Rank: Lieutenant
- Conflicts: World War II
- Awards: Air Medal; Oak leaf cluster

Jasper "Jack" Kraynick (September 2, 1914 – c. October 31, 1943) was an American football back who played for the North Carolina Tar Heels. He later was selected in the 1939 NFL draft, but did not play professionally.

== Early life and education ==
Kraynick was born on September 2, 1914, in Trenton, New Jersey. He attended Trenton Central High School and Staunton Military Academy in Virginia, graduating in 1935. Afterwards he joined the University of North Carolina, and spent his first year on the freshman football team. He was on their varsity roster in 1936, but did not appear in any games.

== Professional career ==
He earned his first varsity playing time in 1937, earning a letter and playing fullback. Following his senior season of 1938, Kraynick was selected in the 12th round (104th overall) of the 1939 NFL draft by the Philadelphia Eagles, but opted not to play professionally. Instead, he taught at Belmont High School and served as athletics director. He resigned in 1941 to join the United States Army Air Forces in World War II.

== Military career ==
He entered on February 15, 1941, and was commissioned a second lieutenant upon graduation from flying school at Maxwell Field. He was promoted to the rank of first lieutenant on February 1, 1942, and was given the Air Medal and an oak leaf cluster in September 1943. He went missing on October 30, 1943, after his plane flying over the Caribbean Sea did not return. He was not found and presumed to have died.

== See also ==
- List of people who disappeared mysteriously at sea
