= Runaway Train (Oleander EP) =

Runaway Train EP

EP by Oleander
- Released: November 19, 2002
- Genre: Post-grunge
- Label: Sanctuary Records

Oleander chronology
Unwind (2001)	Runaway Train EP (2002)	Joyride (2003)

Professional ratings
Review scores
Source	Rating
Allmusic	link

The Runaway Train EP is the second EP from American post-grunge band Oleander. It was released on November 19, 2002 and marks the band's move from Universal Records to Sanctuary.

== Overview ==
The EP's title track was originally featured in the Showtime film Bang Bang You're Dead, which premiered October 13, 2002. A music video was then shot and incorporated footage from the film. The cover photo of the Runaway Train EP depicts a screen shot from the video which was included on the record.

Originally, the band's next studio album, Joyride, was expected for a November 2002 release but took longer than planned. Thus, extra material was compiled for the Runaway Train EP which was sold at Oleander concerts that same month and was intended for a store release as well. The tracks "Runaway Train" and "Rainy Day" would later appear on Joyride in 2003.

Serving as a promotional tool for Oleander's upcoming studio album, Runaway Train was competitively priced at $13.98. Amazon.com also offered a pre-release value-add, where those who ordered Joyride ahead of street date could stream the Runaway Train EP.

== Track listing ==
1. "Runaway Train"
2. "Rainy Day" (acoustic)
3. "Parade"
4. "Runaway Train" (demo)

== Personnel ==
- Thomas Flowers - vocals, rhythm guitar
- Doug Eldridge - bass guitar
- Ric Ivanisevich - lead guitar
- Scott Devours - drums
- Kaylene Peoples - string section arrangements
