= Bang Bang You're Dead (play) =

One-act play written by William Mastrosimone

Bang Bang Dead
- Original language: English
- Written by: William Mastrosimone
- Subject: School violence

Premiere
- Date: April 7, 1999

Bang Bang You're Dead is a 1999 one-act play written by William Mastrosimone. Inspired by the Thurston High School shooting, the play follows a high school shooter who is tormented in his jail cell by apparitions of the five classmates he killed. A film adaptation, also written by Mastrosimone was released in 2002; it depicts a high school production of the play where one of the actors struggles to avoid becoming a shooter like the play's lead character.

== Purpose ==
Mastrosimone stresses the importance of young people seeing the play performed by their peers, and therefore he does not allow the play to be on film or video. Mastrosimone hopes to reach out to potential killers in the thousands of audiences that the play continues to gather.

== Influence ==
Bang, Bang, You're Dead! was written in the wake of three school shootings: Thurston High School (Springfield, Oregon) on May 21, 1998, Heath High School (Paducah, Kentucky) on December 4, 1997, and Westside Middle School (Jonesboro, Arkansas) on March 23, 1998. The names of the cities in which these shootings took place are echoed multiple times within the script.

The tragedy most significant to the play was the shooting at Thurston High School. The play, based strongly on the events that surrounded this particular school shooting, premiered at Thurston. It was performed by Thurston students, some of whom had been wounded in the shooting by Kip Kinkel.

Mastrosimone wrote the first draft while troubled by a recent event at his son's school, in which an anonymous classmate of his son wrote a message on a chalkboard, threatening to kill his classmates and his teacher.

== New York International Fringe Festival ==
"Bang Bang You're Dead" was performed at Fringe NYC 2013 by students from the Actors Playground School of Theatre, and members of their theater company, Playground Theatre Project, from August 9 through 25th. Directed by Ralph Colombino and Dan Cooley, and assisted by Rich Palmros and Stage Manager Gianna Marino, the show was greeted with much praise, led by the performances of Ed Squires and Taylor Rogers, in the lead role of Josh, Ryan Shapiro, Summer Russo, James Garlock, Gracemarie Loretta, and Caroline Palsi.

== Premiere performance ==
Bang, Bang, You're Dead, was first performed in April 1999 at the very spot that inspired it: Thurston High School in Springfield, Oregon.

== Reception ==
The première of Bang, Bang, You're Dead was met with some criticism and controversy as well as praise and even endorsement. Some locals, including Dennis Murphy, the fire chief of Springfield at the time, were hostile towards the production at first. Many thought that Mastrosimone was using the recent tragedies to "cash in." The play was immediately endorsed by the Ribbon of Promise, a group dedicated to nonviolence in schools, formed in Springfield after the shooting.

== Characters ==
- Josh—Josh is the play's main character. The play takes place in his jail cell after he has murdered his parents and five of his classmates. Beneath his arrogant facade, he is deeply insecure and frightened.
- Emily—Josh's best childhood friend and next door neighbor, who he had an unrequited crush on, seeing as she was in a relationship with Michael. She is independent and passionate, and refuses to deal with Josh when he does not follow through on plans or promises, triggering much of Josh's anger.
- Katie— Katie was Josh's girlfriend but she broke up with him because he went hunting instead of taking her to a movie. Katie was Michael's girlfriend when she was killed.
- Michael—Michael is Katie's boyfriend. He is a strong, sensible presence and does not back down in the face of a challenge. When Josh pushes him out of his anger over Michael tearing his picture of his first buck, he begins to fight back.
- Matt—Matt is an older classmate of Josh's but had never met Josh prior to the shooting. He is a smart, academically driven boy.
- Jessie—Jessie was friends with Emily and therefore, knew Josh. She is a "girly girl" who spends a lot of her afterlife thinking about how she will never be able to raise a family of her own.
- The Shadow—Josh's inner "high", his other half, his inner darkness. Possibly symbolic of the masculine pressure placed on Josh to "fit in" in the way his grandfather and others expect him to.
- Actor 1—Actor 1 plays Josh's father, about 30–40 years of age, happily married. He loves his son but does not understand his pain. The actor also plays Josh's grandfather, and the public defender in the court scene flashback.
- Actor 2—Actor 2 plays the judge in the court scene and the prisoner who threatens Josh.
- Actor 3—Actor 3 plays Josh's mother and the witness in the court scene.
- Actor 4—Actor 4 plays the prosecutor and the psychotherapist Josh is forced to see.
- Actor 5—Actor 5 plays the school principal, and old headmaster of Josh's school, slouches slightly and squints frequently, intimidating. the jury forewoman, and the police officer.

All five actors act as a chorus, coloring Josh's would-be monologues. They also are the rumors in school and the voices in the dark that haunt Josh.

== Notes ==
- The 2002 Showtime telemovie Bang Bang You're Dead features students rehearsing and performing the play.
