= Harold F. Brigham =

American librarian (1897–1971)

- Born: Harold Frederick Brigham; May 25, 1897; Newark, New Jersey, US
- Died: March 15, 1971 (aged 73); Indianapolis, Indiana, US
- Burial place: Crown Hill Cemetery
- Education: Princeton University
- Occupation: Librarian
- Employer: Indiana State Library

Harold Frederick Brigham (May 25, 1897 – March 15, 1971) was an American librarian. He served as director of the Indiana State Library and of the Louisville Free Public Library and as interim secretary of the American Library Association in 1948.

== Life and career ==
Brigham was born in Newark, New Jersey, in 1897. Raised in the Trenton Junction section of Ewing Township, New Jersey, Brigham graduated in 1916 from Trenton Central High School, where he lettered in both baseball and track. He enlisted in the United States Naval Reserve after his freshman year at Princeton University and spent most of World War I in Officers' Training School at the Pelham Bay Naval Training Station in New York City. After the war, he spent several months as a librarian at Camp Merritt, New Jersey, before returning to Princeton as a junior in 1919, where he continued his participation on the varsity rowing team.

He graduated with a Bachelor of Arts degree from Princeton University in 1921 and received his librarian's certificate from the library school at the New York Public Library in 1922. He went on to work at libraries in Trenton and New Brunswick, New Jersey, and in Nashville, Tennessee. From 1931 to 1942 he served as the director of Louisville Free Public Library in Louisville, Kentucky, where he also chaired the city's health and welfare council.

In 1942, Brigham became director of the Indiana State Library. He served as executive secretary of the Indiana Commission on Public Records and of the Indiana Library Certification Board. He also served as director and officer of the Indiana Library Association.

Brigham held various offices with the American Library Association throughout his career, including terms as interim secretary (July–August 1948), treasurer (1947–1949), member of the Executive Board (1938–1942), and member of the Committee on Salaries, Insurance and Annuities (1924–1929). As secretary, his role was equivalent to executive director. He variously served as president of the Public Library Association from 1951 to 1952 and briefly as president of the New Jersey Library Association in 1925.

Brigham retired in 1962 and died at St. Vincent Indianapolis Hospital on March 15, 1971, at the age of 73. He was buried at Crown Hill Cemetery. He was married to Rose Shuler Brigham from 1921 until his death. They had two sons and one daughter.
