= Shrinking the Blob =

Studio album by Oleander
- Released: July 29, 1997
- Genre: Grunge
- Length: 57:05
- Label: Fine
- Producer: Richard Mouser

Oleander chronology
Oleander (EP) (1996)	Shrinking the Blob (1997)	February Son (1999)

Professional ratings
Review scores
Source	Rating
AllMusic	3/5 stars

Shrinking the Blob is the debut studio album by American rock band Oleander. It was released independently on July 29, 1997, through Fine Records. Several tracks would be re-recorded and released on the band's next album and major label debut, February Son (1999), including the hit single "Why I'm Here." The song "Jimmy Shaker Day" was also included on the 2001 follow-up Unwind.

== Overview ==
After releasing an eponymous EP 1996, Oleander developed a full-length album, Shrinking the Blob, the following year. This included songs from their EP release as well as some future hit singles.

Oleander gave the album to a friend who worked at 98-Rock KRXQ and had it passed on to program director Curtiss Johnson. Their efforts gained radio exposure for two songs from Shrinking the Blob, "Down When I'm Loaded" and "Stupid." The former gradually became a regional hit, and after opening for Sugar Ray, Oleander was approached by a representative of Republic Records. This paved way for a deal with Universal and the re-recording of their 1997 studio album.

== Track listing ==
All tracks are written by Thomas Flowers, Doug Eldridge, Ric Ivanisevich and Fred Nelson Jr.

No.	Title	Length
1.	"Where Were You Then?"	3:56
2.	"Stupid"	3:59
3.	"Down When I'm Loaded"	4:32
4.	"Why I'm Here"	3:57
5.	"You'll Find Out"	2:42
6.	"Jimmy Shaker Day"	3:21
7.	"Candy Store"	4:25
8.	"Silver Lined"	2:49
9.	"Half an Ass"	2:59
10.	"Shrinking the Blob"	4:25
Total length:		37:05

== Personnel ==
- Thomas Flowers – vocals, guitar
- Doug Eldridge – bass guitar
- Ric Ivanisevich – guitar
- Fred Nelson Jr. – drums
