= Why I'm Here =

1999 single by Oleander

Single by Oleander

from the album February Son
- Released: January 25, 1999
- Genre: Post-grunge
- Length: 3:58
- Label: Universal; Republic
- Songwriters: Thomas Flowers; Oleander
- Producer: Steven Haigler

Oleander singles chronology
| "Why I'm Here" (1999) | "I Walk Alone" (1999) |

"Why I'm Here" is a song by American hard rock band Oleander. It was released as the lead single from their major label debut album February Son in January 1999. The track was previously included on Oleander's eponymous EP in 1996 and their independent LP, Shrinking the Blob, in 1997. Despite comparisons to Nirvana's "Heart-Shaped Box", or perhaps because of them, "Why I'm Here" would become Oleander's highest-charting song in the United States. The promotional CD single of "Why I'm Here" includes both the album version and a "no strings attached" version that omits the violin.

== Composition ==
The melancholy power ballad features various hallmarks of post-grunge. A simple, clean guitar pattern strikingly similar to "Heart-Shaped Box" by Nirvana begins the song; the first three notes, as well as the dynamic contour, of both songs are indeed identical and largely responsible for its criticism. An additional guitar melody and drums enter shortly after with lonesome singing. The pre-chorus introduces a bittersweet violin and eventually enters an aggressive, heavy chorus. Lyrically, "Why I'm Here" describes people's vague resentment toward the narrator as well his/her indifference toward a significant other, singing "I can't love you anymore/I'm scared of the sound of it."

== Reception ==
AllMusic's Heather Phares named "Why I'm Here" one of three AMG Album Picks in her review of Oleander's album February Son. She regarded it as among the band's "finest post-grunge-isms." However, Noel Murray of The A.V. Club viewed the song more negatively, regarding Oleander as "[arriving] too late for grunge and too early for emo." He elaborated that "the band gamely struggles to justify its existence to major-label masters who can hear something marketable, but can't figure out who'd want to buy it."

== Track listing ==
CD single
| No. | Title | Length |
|---|---|---|
| 1. | "Why I'm Here" (LP version) | 3:57 |
| 2. | "Why I'm Here" (acoustic) | 4:11 |
| 3. | "Silver Lined" | 2:47 |
| 4. | "Candy Store" | 4:23 |

== Charts ==
=== Weekly charts ===
| Chart (1999) | Peak position |
|---|---|
| Canada Rock/Alternative (RPM) | 8 |
| US Bubbling Under Hot 100 (Billboard) | 7 |
| US Alternative Airplay (Billboard) | 13 |
| US Mainstream Rock (Billboard) | 3 |

=== Year-end charts ===
| Chart (1999) | Position |
|---|---|
| Canada Rock/Alternative (RPM) | 43 |
| US Mainstream Rock Tracks (Billboard) | 10 |
| US Modern Rock Tracks (Billboard) | 40 |
