= Ndidiamaka Amutah-Onukagha =

American physician and academic

- Born: Trenton, New Jersey
- Education: Rutgers University; University of Maryland, College Park; George Washington University
- Scientific career
- Workplaces: Tufts University School of Medicine; Morgan State University; Montclair State University
- Thesis: Neighborhood level disadvantage, race/ethnicity and infant mortality in Washington DC (2010)

Ndidiamaka Nneoma Amutah-Onukagha is an American researcher who is the Julia A. Okoro Professor of Black Maternal Health at the Tufts University School of Medicine. Her research considers women's health disparities in Black women. Amutah-Onukagha is the inaugural Tufts University Assistant Dean of Diversity, Equity, and Inclusion for Public Health. She was named the American Public Health Association Maternal and Child Health Section's Young Professional of the Year in 2019.

== Early life and education ==
Amutah-Onukagha was born and raised in Trenton, New Jersey and attended Trenton Central High School. Her parents are from Nigeria. At age fifteen, Amutah-Onukagha lost her friend to complications after childbirth, which motivated Amutah-Onukagha to pursue a college degree. She was an undergraduate student at Rutgers University, where she majored in African studies and public health. She joined George Washington University as a graduate student and earned a master's degree in public health. After earning her doctorate, Amutah-Onukagha joined the University of Maryland, College Park. She was named a W. K. Kellogg Foundation research fellow at Morgan State University in 2012 before joining Montclair State University to teach public health.

== Research and career ==
Amutah-Onukagha investigates women's health and maternal mortality. In 2017 Amutah-Onukagha joined Tufts University. Her research is supported by the National Institutes of Health and Robert Wood Johnson Foundation. At Tufts University, Amutah-Onukagha founded the Maternal Outcomes for Translational Health Equity Research (MOTHER) Lab, a research lab that looks to eliminate maternal health disparities. HIV/AIDS is the leading cause of mortality in Black women aged between 18 and 34 in Boston, and Amutah-Onukagha looks to understand and disrupt these pathways.

During the COVID-19 pandemic, Amutah-Onukagha was appointed to the Massachusetts COVID-19 Maternal Equity Coalition. The coalition, which looked to improve maternal health for people of color during the pandemic, sought to address racial inequality in perinatal outcomes.

== Awards and honors ==
- 2019 American Public Health Association Maternal and Child Health Section's Young Professional of the Year Award
- 2020 National Minority Quality Forum Top 40 under 40 Minority Leaders in Healthcare
- 2022 John C. MacQueen Lecture Award

== Selected publications ==
- Kafuli Agbemenu; Samantha Auerbach; Nadine Shaanta Murshid; James Shelton; Ndidiamaka Amutah-Onukagha (2019). "Reproductive Health Outcomes in African Refugee Women: A Comparative Study". Journal of Women's Health. 28 (6): 785–793. doi:10.1089/jwh.2018.7314. PMC 6909669. PMID 30767694. Wikidata Q91611498.
- Ndidiamaka Amutah-Onukagha; Monica Rodriguez; Ijeoma Opara; et al. (2017). "Progresses and challenges of utilizing traditional birth attendants in maternal and child health in Nigeria". International journal of MCH and AIDS. 6 (2): 130–138. doi:10.21106/ijma.204. PMC 5777388. PMID 29367889. Wikidata Q47546217.
- Ndidiamaka Amutah-Onukagha; Meena Mahadevan; Ijeoma Opara; Monica Rodriguez; Megan Trusdell; Jessica Kelly (2018). "Project THANKS: Examining HIV/AIDS-Related Barriers and Facilitators to Care in African American Women: A Community Perspective". AIDS Patient Care and STDs. 32 (4): 119–128. doi:10.1089/apc.2017.0215. PMC 5972771. PMID 29630851. Wikidata Q52598670.
