= William Mastrosimone =

American playwright and screenwriter (born 1947)

- Born: August 19, 1947 (age 79); Trenton, New Jersey, U.S.
- Education: Mason Gross School of the Arts (a part of Rutgers University)
- Occupations: Playwright, screenwriter
- Writing career
- Notable work: Extremities (1982 play)

William Mastrosimone (born August 19, 1947) is an American playwright and screenwriter.

== Early life and education ==
Mastrosimone is from Trenton, New Jersey. He attended high school at The Pennington School in Pennington, New Jersey, and received a graduate degree in playwriting from the Mason Gross School of the Arts, a part of Rutgers University in New Brunswick, New Jersey.

== Career ==
Mastrosimone's first play was the comedy The Woolgatherer, which premiered at the Rutgers Theatre Company in New Jersey in 1979. His other plays include Extremities (drama, 1982), Shivaree, and Cat's Paw. He also wrote Bang Bang You're Dead (one-act drama, 1999), which was once able to be downloaded from the Internet and performed by students for free. Other plays include The Afghan Women and Nanawatai, upon which the war film The Beast (also known as The Beast of War, 1988) is based. Two recent plays are Sleepwalk, a story again focusing on the traumas of modern teenage life; and Dirty Business, a play about a party girl caught between the Mafia and the newly elected president of the United States.

His screenwriting credits include, With Honors (comedy-drama film, 1994), Into the West (Western television miniseries, 2005) and the film adaptation of his play Extremities (drama film, 1986).

=== Awards and nominations ===
He won two Daytime Emmy Awards for Bang, Bang You're Dead and was nominated for a Primetime Emmy Award for Into the West and The Burning Season (biographical drama television movie, 1984).

== See also ==
- List of people from Trenton, New Jersey
- List of playwrights from the United States
- List of Rutgers University people
- List of screenwriters
