= A. Leo Levin =

American legal academic (1919-2015)

- Born: January 9, 1919; New York City, U.S.
- Died: November 24, 2015 (aged 96)
- Education: Yeshiva University (BA); University of Pennsylvania (JD)
- Occupation: Law professor
- Title: Leon Meltzer Professor of Law
- Spouse: Doris (nee Feder)
- Children: 2
- Parent(s): Issaachar and Minerva Hilda (Shapiro) Levin

A. Leo Levin (January 9, 1919 – November 24, 2015) was an American legal scholar who was the Leon Meltzer Professor of Law at the University of Pennsylvania Law School.

== Early life and education ==
Levin was born in New York City to Issaachar and Minerva Hilda (Shapiro) Levin, and grew up in Trenton, New Jersey, where he attended Trenton Central High School. His father was an Orthodox rabbi and Mizrachi leader. He was Jewish. He and his wife Doris (née Feder) had two sons, Allan and Jay.

Levin earned a B.A. from Yeshiva College in 1939, where he was the editor-in-chief of The Commentator and president of the Yeshiva College Student Council. He subsequently received his J.D. from the University of Pennsylvania Law School in 1942, where he was an editor of the University of Pennsylvania Law Review.

== Career ==
During World War II he was a first lieutenant in the United States Air Force from 1942 to 1946 in Europe. He taught at the University of Iowa College of Law as an assistant professor from 1947 to 1949. Decades later, in the 1990s, he returned there to teach.

He was the Leon Meltzer Professor of Law at the University of Pennsylvania Law School; he first joined the faculty in 1949, and became a full professor in 1953.

Levin was the Director of the Federal Judicial Center from 1977 to 1987. He served as president of the Jewish Publication Society, the Jewish Exponent, Lower Merion Synagogue in Bala Cynwyd, Pennsylvania, and the Order of the Coif. He was also vice provost of the University of Pennsylvania, and a vice president of the Union of Orthodox Jewish Congregations of America. He was a founding director of the National Institute for Trial Advocacy, a member of the Standing Committee on Practice and Procedure, Judicial Conference of the United States (1977–78), a member of the National Institute of Corrections, a Fellow of the American Academy of Arts and Sciences, an honorary trustee of Bar-Ilan University, a member of the board of directors of the American Judicature Society, and served on the planning committee of the Claims Commission, which made recommendations regarding allocation of reparation monies to be paid to Holocaust survivors.

Among Levin's writings are A. Leo Levin, Philip Shuchman, & Charles M. Yablon, Civil Procedure: Cases and Materials, 2d ed. (Foundation Press 2000), Russell R. Wheeler & A. Leo Levin, Judicial Discipline and Removal in the United States (Federal Judicial Center 1979), A. Leo Levin, Russell R. Wheeling & R. Pound, The Pound Conference: Perspectives on Justice in the Future (West 1979), A. Leo Levin, Problems and Materials on Trial Advocacy (Foundation Press 1968), and A. Leo Levin & M. Kramer, New Provisions in the Ketubah: A Legal Opinion (Yeshiva University 1955).

Levin died at 96 years of age. The annual A. Leo Levin Award for Excellence in an Introductory Course was established in 2002 at the University of Pennsylvania Law School in his honor.
