= Helen Boehm =

- Born: December 26, 1920
- Died: November 15, 2010 (aged 89)
- Occupation: businesswoman
- Known for: "Princess of Porcelain"

Helen Boehm (December 26, 1920 – November 15, 2010) was an American businesswoman who played a pivotal role in promoting the ceramic sculptures created by her husband, Edward Marshall Boehm, earning her the nickname the "Princess of Porcelain". A luncheon invitation from First Lady Mamie Eisenhower helped make Boehm's designs a standard gift from U.S. Presidents to foreign dignitaries. She was born as Elena Francesca Stephanie Franzolin in 1920 to immigrants from Genoa, Italy, and was raised in Bensonhurst, Brooklyn. She began working as a teenager following the death of her father, later studying to become an optician. After she qualified for grinding and fitting prescription glasses, she landed a job with Manhattan's leading optical firm, E.B. Myerowitz.

She married Edward Marshall Boehm, a veterinary assistant who raised livestock and created sculptures of animals in his spare time, in 1944. Helen Boehm borrowed money from one of her customers and used the funds to help her husband devote his time to his art at what was originally called E.M. Boehm Studios, located in the basement of their home in Trenton, New Jersey, founded in 1950. Their breakthrough came in 1951, when the Curator of the American Wing of the Metropolitan Museum of Art in New York purchased two statues for the museum's collection. Helen took on the promotional and marketing side of the business, selling pieces to the Metropolitan Museum of Art and offering a porcelain bull to Mamie Eisenhower after wrangling an invitation to the White House.

After the sudden death of her husband, aged 55, in 1969, Helen took over operation of the company and maintained the "Edward Marshall Boehm" logo. There is a lack of copyright differentiation between the works produced during Edward Marshall Boehm's lifetime, 1951–1969 and the works done after his death by the Boehm firm. In 1969 Helen directed the creation of The Bird of Peace, later gifted to China during Nixon's historic 1972 visit to the country. The firms' artisans created a porcelain copy of the wedding bouquet of Diana, Princess of Wales and crafted a white rose in her memory following her death. Sculptures the firm produced after the death of Edward Boehm are owned by individuals including Queen Elizabeth II, Mikhail Gorbachev and Pope John Paul II at times reportedly range in value from hundreds to tens of thousands of dollars. She sold the concern in 2003.

Her autobiography With a Little Luck: An American Odyssey was published in 1985. A resident of Trump Plaza in West Palm Beach, Florida, Helen Boehm died on November 15, 2010, at her home from complications of cancer and Parkinson's disease. She was 89 years old. She had no immediate survivors, though she and her husband had raised her nieces at an earlier time.
