= Trenton Central High School =

High school in Mercer County, New Jersey, US

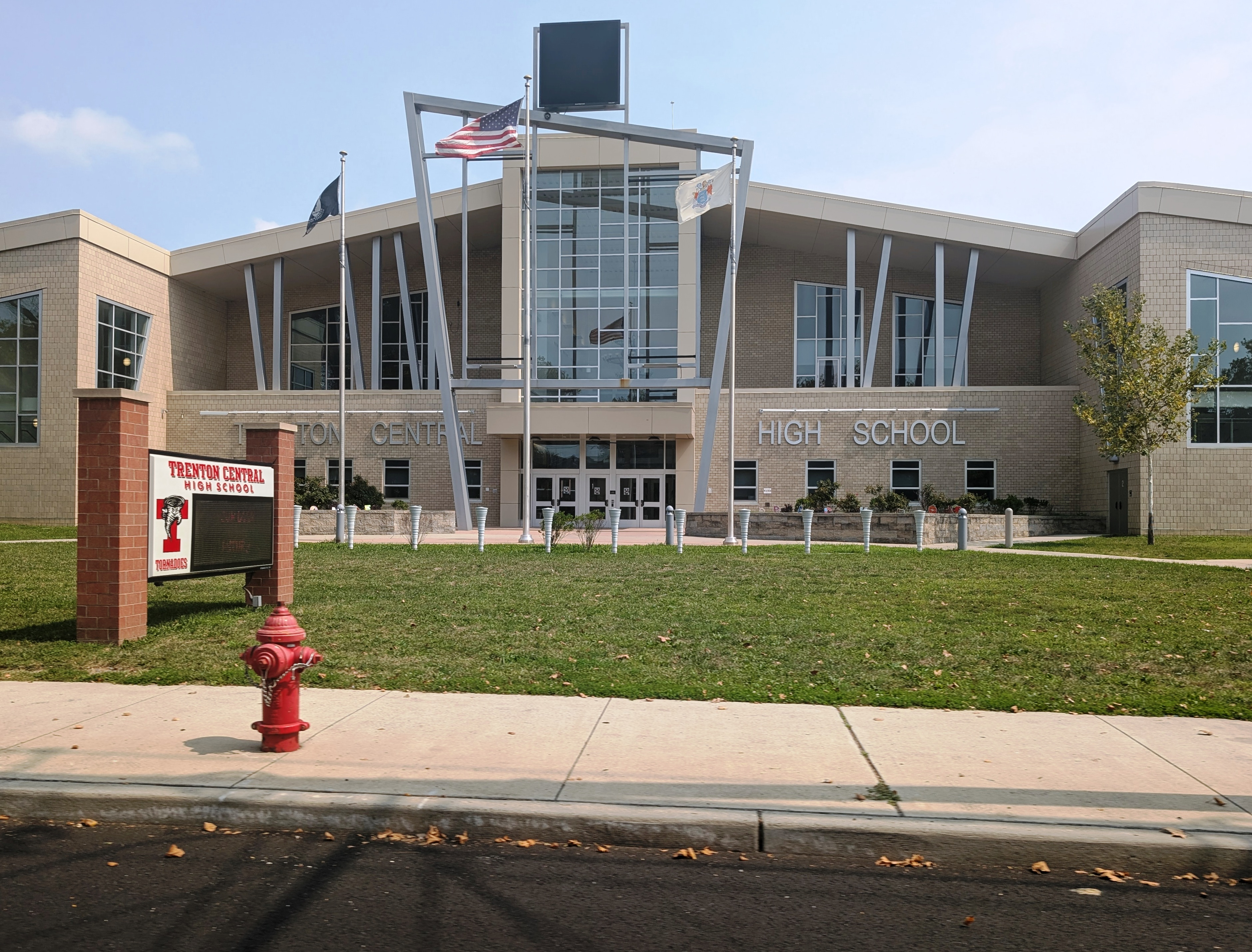
- Main entrance to school on Chambers Street

Location
- 400 Chambers Street; Trenton, Mercer County, New Jersey 08609; United States; 40.218986°N 74.744269°W

Information
- Type: Public high school
- School district: Trenton Public Schools
- NCES School ID: 341629003200
- Principal: Mary Courtney
- Faculty: 157.4 FTEs
- Grades: 10-12
- Enrollment: 2,097 (as of 2024–25)
- Student to teacher ratio: 13.3:1
- Colors: Red and black
- Athletics conference: Colonial Valley Conference (general); West Jersey Football League (football)
- Team name: Tornadoes
- Website: trentoncentralhs.ss20.sharpschool.com

Trenton Central High School is a three-year comprehensive public high school that serves students in tenth through twelfth grades from Trenton, in Mercer County, in the U.S. state of New Jersey, operating as part of the Trenton Public Schools.

As of the 2024–25 school year, the school had an enrollment of 2,097 students and 157.4 classroom teachers (on an FTE basis), for a student–teacher ratio of 13.3:1. There were 1,424 students (67.9% of enrollment) eligible for free lunch and 63 (3.0% of students) eligible for reduced-cost lunch.

== History ==
In the late 1920s the Trenton Board of Education acquired one of the last undeveloped tracts in the city: the 36-acre (150,000 m^{2}) Chambers Farm, then used as a nursery. The new high school would be the city's third, replacing the then existing high school at Chestnut and Hamilton Avenues built in 1900, which in turn replaced the first high school on Mercer Street built in 1874.

Trenton Central High School (TCHS) opened on January 4, 1932, and was dedicated on January 18 at ceremonies attended by 5,000 people. Hailed as "an ornament to the city" and "one of the show places of Trenton," TCHS was one of the largest and most expensive high schools built in the country. The Chambers Street façade stretches for almost 1,000 feet (300 m), nearly as long as the Empire State Building is tall. The cost of the building, including land and furniture, totaled $3.3 million (equivalent to $77.9 million in 2025). Most firms involved in the construction were based in Trenton, including John A. Roebling's Sons who provided "Jersey" wire lath to fireproof the ceilings and walls. After over 80 years, the 1932 building was demolished, and replaced by a new school building opening in September 2019.

Trenton Central High School was the focus of a 2005 research study aimed at preventing obesity in students, in which student evaluations of the results played a major role in interpretation of the outcomes.

== Awards, recognition and rankings ==
The school was the 333rd-ranked public high school in New Jersey out of 339 schools statewide in New Jersey Monthly magazine's September 2014 cover story on the state's "Top Public High Schools", using a new ranking methodology.

Schooldigger.com ranked the school 372nd out of 381 public high schools statewide in its 2011 rankings (a decrease of 14 positions from the 2010 ranking) which were based on the combined percentage of students classified as proficient or above proficient on the mathematics (22.9%) and language arts literacy (60.2%) components of the High School Proficiency Assessment (HSPA).

== Academics ==
Trenton Central High School is divided into Small Learning Communities (SLCs) that span across three separate sites throughout the city of Trenton. The Chambers Campus, located on Chambers Street, houses five communities: Science, Technology, Engineering, and Mathematics (STEM), Visual and Performing Arts (VPA), Restaurant and Business (R&B), School of Communications, and Health Professions. The North Campus is located on N. Clinton Avenue and is home to the Medical Arts community. The West Campus sits on West State Street in the building that was formerly the home of the Arthur J. Holland Middle School. Three communities reside there: Law and Justice, Renaissance, and Business and Finance.

== Athletics ==
The Trenton Central High School Tornadoes compete in the Colonial Valley Conference, which is comprised of public and private high schools in Mercer, Middlesex and Monmouth counties, operating under the supervision of the New Jersey State Interscholastic Athletic Association (NJSIAA). With 2,424 students in grades 10-12, the school was classified by the NJSIAA for the 2019–20 school year as Group IV for most athletic competition purposes, which included schools with an enrollment of 1,060 to 5,049 students in that grade range. The football team competes in the Capitol Division of the 94-team West Jersey Football League superconference and was classified by the NJSIAA as Group V South for football for 2024–2026, which included schools with 1,333 to 2,324 students.

The boys' basketball team has won seven Group IV state titles: in 1927 vs. Passaic High School, in 1928 vs. New Brunswick High School, in both 1932 and 1933 vs. South Side High School (since renamed as Malcolm X Shabazz High School), in 1934 vs. Union Hill High School, in 1935 vs. New Brunswick High School and in 1961 vs. Camden High School. The 1927 team won the state championship in Class A (since recategorized as Group IV) after defeating a Passaic High School team that had won five of the previous seven state finals and came into the tournament with a 23-game winning streak. A crowd of 4,000 spectators at Rutgers University saw the team win the 1933 Group IV title with a 31-17 defeat of South Side in the playoff finals. The 1935 team won the program's fourth consecutive Group IV state title by defeating Morristown High School in the semifinals and knocking off New Brunswick by a score of 20-14 in the championship game. A crowd of more than 3,000 watched at Rutgers University as the 1961 team, led by Tal Brody, won the Group IV state championship and finished with a 24–0 record for the season after a 66-55 win against two-time defending champion Camden in the tournament finals. Brody was selected to the first team Newark Star-Ledger All-State Team. Brody, though later drafted # 12 in the NBA draft, passed up an NBA career to play in Israel. The team won the Central Jersey Group IV sectional championship in 2003 with a 54–40 win over Old Bridge High School.

The boys' cross country team won the all groups state championship in 1941, 1942 and 1945.

The boys' soccer team was awarded the Group IV state championship in 1946 and 1949, and won the Group IV state championship in 1961 (vs. Bloomfield High School), 1963 (vs. Teaneck High School) and 1964 (vs. East Side High School).

The baseball team won the Central Jersey Group IV state sectional championship in 1962, 1964 and 1965, and won the South Jersey Group IV title in 1966.

The boys' track team won the Group IV indoor relay state championship in 1977–1979, 1981 (as co-champion with Plainfield High School), 1984, 1986 (as co-champion with Edgewood Regional High School), 2007, 2008 (as co-champion with Hillsborough High School) and 2012; the program's seven state titles are tied for fourth-most in the state. The girls' team won the Group IV title in 2000–2002.

The boys' track team won the winter track Meet of Champions in 1977 and 1978.

The girls' basketball team won the Group IV state championships in 2002 vs. Morristown High School, in 2007 vs. Eastside High School and in 2008 vs. John F. Kennedy High School. The team won the 2007 Central Jersey Group IV state sectional title with a 51–24 win against Howell High School. The team moved on to win the 2007 Group IV state championship, defeating Eastside High School 52-44 for the title.

== Extracurricular activities ==
The Tornadoes 381 FIRST robotics team, from the Applied Engineering & Science Academy, is sponsored by Bristol Myers Squibb, Sarnoff Corporation and Princeton University. The Team 381 Tornadoes were the 2004 Philadelphia Regional Winner in the FIRST Robotics Competition. In 2008, the Tornados became the Trenton Regional Winners.

The school includes a military program called United States Army JROTC (Reserve Officers Training Corps).

== Administration ==
The school's principal is Mary Courtney. Her core administration team includes five vice principals.

== Notable faculty ==
- Joey Fink (born 1951), former professional soccer player, now teaching health and phys ed.

== Notable alumni ==
- Ndidiamaka Amutah-Onukagha (born 1981, class of 1999), physician who is the Julia A. Okoro Professor of Black Maternal Health at the Tufts University School of Medicine
- George Antheil (1900–1959), composer (dropped out in senior year, 1918)
- Henry W. Antheil Jr. (1912–1940), American diplomat killed in the shootdown of the Kaleva airplane by Soviet aircraft at the outset of the Soviet occupation of the Baltic States
- Bo Belinsky (1936–2001), MLB pitcher, threw no-hitter for Los Angeles Angels
- Elvin Bethea (born 1946), Pro Football Hall of Fame defensive end who played his entire NFL career with the Houston Oilers
- Mike Bloom (1915–1993), professional basketball player for the Baltimore Bullets, Boston Celtics, Minneapolis Lakers and Chicago Stags
- Joseph L. Bocchini Jr. (born 1944, class of 1962), politician who served in the New Jersey General Assembly from the 14th Legislative District from 1982 to 1988
- Harold F. Brigham (1897–1971, class of 1916), librarian
- Tal Brody (born 1943), basketball player, University of Illinois, selected twelfth in the 1965 NBA draft, Euroleague basketball shooting guard for Maccabi Tel Aviv
- Ji'Ayir Brown (born 2000), American football safety for the San Francisco 49ers of the National Football League
- Kahzir Brown (born 2003), defensive back for the Ottawa Redblacks of the Canadian Football League
- George Case (1915–1989), major league baseball player
- Albert Cooper (1904–1993, class of 1921), U.S. Olympic soccer goalkeeper in 1928 who later served in the New Jersey General Assembly
- Narciso Crook (born 1995, class of 2012), professional baseball outfielder for the Chicago Cubs
- Richard Crooks (1900–1972), tenor, singer for the New York Metropolitan Opera
- Mathias J. DeVito (1930–2019), businessperson and lawyer who served as the president and chief executive officer of The Rouse Company
- David N. Dinkins (1927-2020), former Mayor of New York City
- Al Downing (born 1941), major league baseball player who was the 1964 American League strikeout leader
- John Easton (1933–2001), baseball player who played briefly for the Philadelphia Phillies
- Nick Frascella (1914–2000), professional basketball player who played in the National Basketball League for the Akron Goodyear Wingfoots
- Greg Grant (born 1966), retired NBA basketball player
- Mel Groomes (1927–1997), football player and baseball coach who played for the Detroit Lions
- Harry Heher (1889–1972, class of 1907), Justice on the New Jersey Supreme Court
- Jay-Z (born 1969), billionaire business mogul, rapper, record executive, songwriter, media mogul and sports agent
- Mike Kearns (1929–2009), NBA player for the Philadelphia Warriors
- Ernie Kovacs (1919–1962), groundbreaking American comedian, film actor and television personality
- Jack Kraynick (1914–1943), football back who played for the North Carolina Tar Heels
- Frederick Kroesen (1923–2020), United States Army four-star general
- A. Leo Levin (1919–2015), legal scholar who was the Leon Meltzer Professor of Law at the University of Pennsylvania Law School
- Sol Linowitz (1913–2005), diplomat, lawyer and businessman
- Joseph P. Merlino (1922–1998), politician who served as President of the New Jersey Senate from 1978 to 1981
- Athing Mu-Nikolayev (born 2002, class of 2020), gold medalist in the 800 meters at the 2020 Summer Olympics in Tokyo
- Charles Muscatine (1920–2010), academic and expert in medieval literature
- George Nemchik (1915–1988, class of 1932), soccer playerwho competed with the U.S. national team and was a member of the 1936 U.S. Olympic Soccer team
- Keith Newell (born 1988), football offensive lineman for the Philadelphia Soul of the Arena Football League
- Gail Peters (born 1929, class of 1947), former competition swimmer who represented the United States at the 1952 Summer Olympics in Helsinki in the 200-meter breaststroke
- Verlina Reynolds-Jackson (born 1971), politician who represents the 15th Legislative District in the New Jersey General Assembly
- Sido L. Ridolfi (1913–2004), politician who served in the New Jersey Senate from 1954 to 1972
- Amy Robinson (born 1948, class of 1966), film producer and former actress
- Almondo Sewell (born 1987), football player who has played for the Edmonton Eskimos of the Canadian Football League
- Ntozake Shange (1948–2018, class of 1966), playwright and poet best known for her Obie Award-winning play, For Colored Girls Who Have Considered Suicide / When the Rainbow Is Enuf
- Victor W. Sidel (1931–2018, class of 1949), physician who was one of the co-founders of Physicians for Social Responsibility in 1961
- Alton Sutnick (born 1928), medical researcher and educator
- Alphonso Taylor (born 1969), defensive tackle who played in the NFL for the Denver Broncos
- Dantouma Toure (born 2004), soccer player who plays as a winger for New York Red Bulls II in the USL Championship via the New York Red Bulls Academy
- Wendy Vereen (born 1966), former track and field sprinter who specialized in the 100 and 200-meter dashes
