= Nick Frascella =

American basketball player (1914–2000)

Personal information
- Born: July 6, 1914 Trenton, New Jersey, U.S.
- Died: April 9, 2000 (aged 85) Tallmadge, Ohio, U.S.
- Listed height: 6 ft 2 in (1.88 m)
- Listed weight: 185 lb (84 kg)

Career information
- High school: Trenton Central (Trenton, New Jersey)
- College: Wooster (1935–1938)
- Position: Forward

Career history
- 1938–1941, 1946–1947: Akron Goodyear Wingfoots

Nicholas Anthony Frascella (July 6, 1914 – April 9, 2000) was an American professional basketball player. He played in the National Basketball League for the Akron Goodyear Wingfoots and averaged 2.1 points per game.
