= Albert Cooper (soccer) =

American soccer player

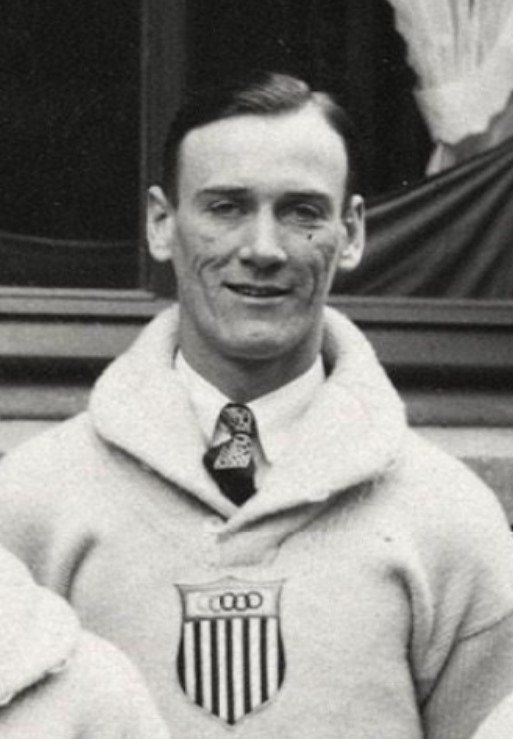
- Albert Cooper in 1928

Personal information
- Full name: Albert Cooper Jr.
- Date of birth: February 23, 1904
- Place of birth: Trenton, New Jersey
- Date of death: December 24, 1993 (aged 89)
- Position: Goalkeeper

Senior career*
Years	Team	Apps	(Gls)
- Trenton F.C.
- Trenton Highlanders

International career
1928	United States	2	(0)
Basketball career
Career history
Trenton Tigers
Trenton Bengals
- * Club domestic league appearances and goals

Albert Cooper Jr. (February 23, 1904 – December 1993) was an American soccer player who played as a goalkeeper and later served in the New Jersey General Assembly. Cooper earned two cap with the U.S. national team in 1928. The first came at the 1928 Summer Olympics when the U.S. lost to Argentina 11–2. Following this loss, the U.S. tied Poland, 3-3, on June 10, 1928. At the time of the Olympics, he played for Trenton F.C.

Born and raised in Trenton, New Jersey, Cooper attended Trenton Central High School, from which he graduated in 1921. After his Olympic play, he competed for the Trenton Highlanders of the American Soccer League and played minor league baseball. He also played basketball, including for the Trenton Tigers and the Trenton Bengals of the American Basketball League. An attorney, he was elected to serve as Sheriff of Mercer County, New Jersey and represented Trenton as a Democrat in the New Jersey General Assembly.
