= February Son =

Studio album by Oleander
- Released: February 23, 1999
- Recorded: 1998
- Studio: Studio D (San Francisco, California)
- Genre: Post-grunge
- Length: 44:57
- Label: Universal
- Producer: Steven Haigler

Oleander chronology
Shrinking the Blob (1997)	February Son (1999)	Unwind (2001)

Singles from February Son
- 1. "Why I'm Here" Released: January 25, 1999; 2. "I Walk Alone" Released: July 25, 1999

February Son is the second studio album and major label debut by American rock band Oleander. It was released on February 23, 1999, through Universal Records. Produced by Steven Haigler, the album contains several tracks that were re-recorded from their independent release Shrinking the Blob (1997), including the single "Why I'm Here." February Son was certified gold in sales by the RIAA on May 5, 2000.

== History ==
Prior to Oleander signing a major label deal with Universal Records, drummer Fred Nelson, Jr. departed from the band. For the February Son sessions, Jonathan Mover was added onto drums. Towards the end of the recording sessions, Nelson returned to the band and replaced Mover.

February Son includes Oleander's breakout lead single, "Why I'm Here," and "I Walk Alone." The latter had a music video while the lead single was featured on the popular TV series Dawson's Creek, as well as in the films American Pie and Scary Movie 2. A cover of The Cure's "Boys Don't Cry" would serve as a UK single supported by a video in the summer of 2000. Directed by Cousin Mike, the video stars Bloodhound Gang leader Jimmy Pop who played a nerdy man living in an apartment. Oleander surrounds him as they loudly perform the song, forcing him to weep. Frontman Thomas Flowers explained that the song "really typifies and exemplifies everything that I'm already trying to say on the album."

In promotion of February Son, the group opened for headliners Creed and Our Lady Peace. They also performed at Woodstock '99. In December 1999, Oleander and Kid Rock performed a charity concert for the Atlanta Community Food Bank. The band also played a New Year's Eve concert with Fastball at the Sacramento Convention Center.

== Reception ==
Professional ratings
Review scores
Source	Rating
AllMusic	3/5 stars
Kerrang!	4/5 stars

February Son received some criticism for allegedly imitating the influential grunge flagship Nirvana, particularly on "Why I'm Here" which begins with a similar note pattern as "Heart-Shaped Box." However, despite the accusation, other songs were cited as having unique and enjoyable melodies, and the album managed to sell over a half-million copies.

Adrianne Stone of Rolling Stone wrote, "Razor sharp guitars on 'Lost Cause,' violin enhancing the warm tones of first single 'Why I'm Here,' and a surprise false ending on 'Never Again' are typical augmentations on a riff-laden album that hints of Nirvana's pained alterna-pop."

== Track listing ==
All lyrics are written by Thomas Flowers; all music is composed by Oleander, except where noted.

No.	Title	Writer(s)	Length
1.	"You'll Find Out"		3:12
2.	"Stupid"		3:51
3.	"Down When I'm Loaded"		4:24
4.	"Why I'm Here"		3:58
5.	"I Walk Alone"		4:09
6.	"Lost Cause"		4:28
7.	"Where Were You Then?"	Flowers; Ivanisevich	4:05
8.	"Shrinking the Blob"		4:25
9.	"How Could I?"		5:13
10.	"Boys Don't Cry" (The Cure cover)	Robert Smith; Lol Tolhurst; Michael Dempsey	3:14
11.	"Never Again"		3:58
Total length:			44:57

== Personnel ==
Oleander

- Thomas Flowers – lead vocals, rhythm guitar
- Doug Eldridge – bass guitar
- Ric Ivanisevich – lead guitar
- Fred Nelson, Jr. – drums

Production

- Steven Haigler – producer, engineering, mixing
- Ted Jensen – mastering
- Mike Crenshaw – assistant engineering
- P.R. Brown – art direction

Additional personnel

- Jonathan Mover – drums
- Rich Mouser – guitar
- Kristina Kopriva – backing vocals
- Steven "Tambourine Man" Haigler – percussion

== Charts ==
Chart (1999)	Peak position
US Billboard 200	115
US Billboard Top Heatseekers	1

=== Singles ===
Song	Chart	Peak position	Year
"Why I'm Here"	Mainstream Rock Tracks	3	1999
"Why I'm Here"	Modern Rock Tracks	13	1999
"I Walk Alone"	Mainstream Rock Tracks	24	1999
"I Walk Alone"	Modern Rock Tracks	37	1999

=== Certifications ===
Country	Certification	Sales
United States	Gold	500,000+
