= Matthew Edward Duke =

American pilot

Matthew Edward Duke (4 February 1915 – 12 May 1960) was an American pilot, once married to tobacco heiress Melody Thomson. Duke, who was described by relatives as an "anti-communist crusader", eventually turned to making a living by off flying anti-Castro Cubans to U.S. exile for $1,000 a job. In May 1960, he was ambushed by police after touching down on Highway 15 west of Havana, and was killed after they opened fire as he attempted to return to the sky.
