= Broadcaster (album) =

Studio album by Triple Fast Action
- Released: 1996
- Genre: Alternative rock
- Label: Capitol
- Producer: Don Fleming

Triple Fast Action chronology
Broadcaster (1996)	Cattlemen Don't (1997)

Broadcaster is the first album by the American band Triple Fast Action, released in 1996. "Revved Up" was the album's first single. The band supported the album with a North American tour. Broadcaster was a commercial failure.

== Production ==
The album was produced by Don Fleming in New York, with Brad Wood working on two tracks at Idful Music Corporation in Chicago. The band finished recording the album in March 1995, although it was not released until April 1996.

== Critical reception ==
Professional ratings
Review scores
Source	Rating
AllMusic	3/5 stars
Chicago Tribune	3/4 stars
The Encyclopedia of Popular Music	3/5 stars

The Chicago Tribune wrote that "tempos rise and fall like a roller coaster, texture counts as much as hooks, and the studio is used like a mood-enhancing drug." Trouser Press thought that, "on the dreamy 'Don’t Tell', the concussive 'American City World' and the closing ten-minute 'Superstar' (by turns wan and wild), [Wes] Kidd shows that he can do propulsive, smartened-up modern rock as well as anyone else these days." The Washington Post noted that the band's "gift for melody overwhelms its more self-conscious tendencies ... The album is occasionally annoying, but its dumb gimmicks are roughly balanced by smart songs."

The Richmond Times-Dispatch praised the "breakneck rhythms, guitar pyrotechnics and angst-filled vocals," writing that "each song points to a lot of consideration in arrangements, execution and mix." The Daily Herald called the album "chock-full of energetic, pop-laced modern rock nuggets distinguished by Kidd's appealingly raspy vocals and his and [Ronnie] Schneider's aggressive guitar work." The Chicago Sun-Times opined that the band's "brand of power pop has an undeterred grace fueled by Wes Kidd's vibrant vocals and the group's solid musicianship."

AllMusic wrote that "the band's full-throttle, post-Nirvana rock would have played better in 1993 than in 1996, when this type of thing was already going out of style."

== Track listing ==
No.	Title	Length
1.	"Aerosmith"	3:08
2.	"Anna (Get Your Gun)"	3:23
3.	"Revved Up"	4:11
4.	"Bird Again"	2:27
5.	"超級巨星"	1:38
6.	"Don't Tell"	5:36
7.	"American City World"	3:38
8.	"Cheery"	3:39
9.	"Rest My Head"	4:59
10.	"Never Ever Care"	3:21
11.	"Sally Tree"	2:59
12.	"Paris"	4:56
13.	"Superstar"	9:59

== Personnel ==
- Wes Kidd – vocals, guitar
- Ronnie Schneider – guitar
- Brian St. Clair – drums
- Kevin Tihista – bass
