= Kevin Tihista =

American singer-songwriter

- Born: March 1968 (age 57)
- Genres: Chamber pop, indie rock, acoustic rock, lo-fi, indie pop
- Occupations: Bassist singer-songwriter
- Years active: 1996–present
- Labels: Easy Tiger, Rough Trade Records, Division One, Parasol Records, Broken Horse Records

Kevin Tihista is a singer-songwriter and musician. He is a former bassist for the Chicago group Triple Fast Action and contributed songs to the Veruca Salt album Resolver. Tihista's solo music is a mixture of pop and rock combining orchestration, electronica, vamping, and multi-tracking. Much of his solo work has been released under the eponym, "Kevin Tihista's Red Terror," a musical collaboration between Tihista and brothers Tom and Ellis Clark of the band "Epicycle."

== Early life ==
Kevin Tihista was born in Walnut Creek, CA in the San Francisco Bay area. He began playing guitar in the seventh grade. As a teenager in the 80's, Tihista was a self-described loner and fan of heavy metal bands like Kiss and Mötley Crüe until his junior year in high school when his brother gave him a tape of Meat Is Murder by the Smiths. Tihista promptly tore down the heavy metal posters adorning his room and began listening to similar alternative rock and punk/gothic rock bands like The Cure and Siouxsie and the Banshees. His parents’ divorce and frequent moves during his high school years led an increasingly alienated Tihista to drop out of high school.

== Career ==
Tihista worked a series of odd jobs until, at 21, he moved to Chicago and eventually joined Wes Kidd as bassist for the band Triple Fast Action. According to Kidd, Tihista came up with the name "Triple Fast Action," inspired by a Gold Bond medicated powder commercial. Triple Fast Action enjoyed moderate success during the mid-1990s releasing two albums: Broadcaster (1996) and Cattleman Don't (1997). After Triple Fast Action disbanded in 1998, Tihista was recruited by Veruca Salt’s Louise Post in the wake of Nina Gordon’s departure from the group. Veruca Salt's fifth album, Resolver, was released in 2000. Tihista wrote or co-wrote three songs for the album with Post including "Imperfectly," "Officially Dead," and "Hellraiser" but was reportedly unhappy with the results and left the band before the album's release.

His experience with Veruca Salt was, however, a catalyst for Tihista's theretofore untapped songwriting talent. Collaborations with Tom and Ellis Clark of the band Epicycle followed in the form of a new band, "Kevin Tihista's Red Terror," with Ellis Clark producing. The group's name, "Red Terror," was apparently inspired by a famous racing horse of the same name, an allusion underscored by the album art of the group's 2001 EP and first full-length release, "Don't Breathe A Word," in 2001. Despite its untimely release by "Division One," an imprint of Atlantic Records, only a week after the September 11, 2001 attacks, the album was hailed by UNCUT magazine as one of the top 20 albums of 2001. After Division One folded in October 2001, Tihista signed with Parasol Records and the group's second album, "Judo," was released in 2002. Parasol released the group's third album, "Wake Up Captain," in 2004. Tihista also recorded with Epicycle during this period performing harmony vocals on the songs "Crash" and "Big Day" for Epicycle's 2002 album, "Swirl.”

In 2005, Tihista released a collection of demos and studio tracks without the "Red Terror" appellation entitled "Home Demons" with the UK label, Broken Horse. The Broken Horse issue contained 20 tracks (or 21 including the hidden acoustic version of "Can I Count On You?"). The U.S. version on Parasol contained just 14 tracks (including the exclusive "Do You Know What We Should Do Now?").

Tihista's work with Tom and Ellis Clark has primarily been in the studio arranging and producing his songs: the three rarely perform live as a band. Instead, on occasion, Tihista has engaged other musicians to perform on the road with him including Randy Diderrich of "Sunday Runners" and brothers Steve and Gary Vermilion of "Pheasant." This incarnation of the band can be heard in one of its rare studio appearances on the song "Jim Henson's Blues/You're Not Bad" from the album "Home Demons." Tihista's solo success has been undercut by harrowing bouts of stage fright. Although he often performed live in front of audiences as the bassist for Triple Fast Action, Tihista appears uncomfortable performing the role of a "front man" and, consequently, his stage fright has sometimes limited his ability to tour in support of his albums.

In many music reviews Tihista's music is frequently compared to the work of singer-songwriter Elliott Smith. When interviewed, however, Tihista often seems to resist the comparison and claims he is largely unfamiliar with Smith's work. Influences Tihista has acknowledged in interviews include Tears for Fears, the Smiths, Cat Stevens, Bread and America, among others. He has consistently named Tears for Fears' "The Hurting" as his favorite album.

On May 26, 2007, Tihista's MySpace blog announced that he was finishing work on his forthcoming album, "Modern Standard" with long-time collaborators Tom and Ellis Clark.

On July 29, 2009, a message from Kevin Tihista through his UK label Broken Horse appeared on the Drowned in Sound message boards. Kevin reported that he hasn't released anything in a while due to a lack of an American record label, however Broken Horse recently purchased him home recording gear. He has over 100 new songs plus hundreds of stock piled songs with the plan to preview some on YouTube soon. He plans to release a lot of material in 2010.

On August 24, 2009, Tihista's MySpace blog announced that he was finishing work on a new album with the running title, "On This Dark Street." The recording is apparently the fulfillment of the song collection previously intended for release as "Modern Standard," an album title which Tihista now refers to as "cursed." Tihista describes the new album as home recorded and stripped down in comparison with his previous releases. The album was released on Broken Horse.

On December 3, 2009, Broken Horse listed on its blog the titles of over 30 new Kevin Tihista songs that had been recorded.

In 2012, Tihista released an album "On This Dark Street", produced with Ellis Clark.

"Modern Standard" was released on July 29, 2013, by Broken Horse records and is also available with a limited edition 4 track EP on a CD-R with hand-stamped artwork.

== Discography ==
Kevin Tihista's Red Terror – Kevin Tihista's Red Terror (EP) (August 2001) Rough Trade Records
Don't Breathe A Word – Kevin Tihista's Red Terror (September 2001) Division One/Atlantic
Judo – Kevin Tihista's Red Terror (2002) Parasol
Wake Up Captain – Kevin Tihista's Red Terror (2004) Parasol
Home Demons, Vol. 1 – Kevin Tihista (2005) Parasol/Broken Horse
On This Dark Street – Kevin Tihista (2012) Broken Horse
Modern Standard – Kevin Tihista (2013) Broken Horse
