= Ghost Notes =

Studio album by Veruca Salt
- Released: July 10, 2015
- Genre: Alternative rock
- Length: 54:48
- Label: El Camino
- Producer: Brad Wood

Veruca Salt chronology
MMXIV (2014)	Ghost Notes (2015)

Singles from Ghost Notes
- 1. "Laughing in the Sugar Bowl" Released: May 19, 2015

Ghost Notes is the fifth full-length studio album by American rock band Veruca Salt, released on July 10, 2015, through El Camino Media. It is the first to feature the band's original lineup since their second album, Eight Arms to Hold You (1997).

== Background ==
Following the band's 1997 release Eight Arms to Hold You, drummer Jim Shapiro quit. Shortly after, in 1998, Nina Gordon and bassist Steve Lack also left, leaving Louise Post to release two new Veruca Salt albums with other musicians, Resolver in 2000, and IV in 2006. Gordon told The Los Angeles Times that after seeing the reception from Mazzy Star's 2012 reunion she got the desire to make music with Post again. The two met up for the first time in 14 years and began writing music that would become Ghost Notes.

== Production and release ==
For Ghost Notes, the four original band members collaborated more on songwriting than they had before. The lyrics focused on their shared experiences, with Gordon saying, "I think a lot of the content in the new songs is about our feelings surrounding the breakup, regrets about the breakup, the thrill of getting back together. It's really not so much about our individual lives the way it used to be."

Ghost Notes was released on July 10, 2015. It was produced by Brad Wood, who also produced Veruca Salt's debut American Thighs. Two of the songs had previously been released. "The Museum of Broken Relationships" was on the band's 2014 Record Store Day release MMXIV, and "Black and Blonde" is a new recording (with a new chorus and revised lyrics) of a song originally recorded by Gordon for her first solo album, Tonight and the Rest of My Life (2000).

The double-LP vinyl edition released by El Camino in January 2016 features a revised track listing with three additional selections.

== Critical reception ==
Professional ratings
Aggregate scores
Source	Rating
Metacritic	78/100
Review scores
Source	Rating
AllMusic	4/5 stars
The A.V. Club	B+
Consequence of Sound	B
Now Magazine	4/5 stars
Paste	9.1/10
Spin	7/10
Under the Radar	7/10
Pitchfork	7.0/10

Ghost Notes received mostly positive reviews from music critics. At Metacritic, which assigns a normalized rating out of 100 to reviews from mainstream critics, the album has an average score of 78 out of 100, which indicates "generally favorable reviews", based on 12 reviews.

Writing for Consequence of Sound and rating the album a "B", Nina Corcoran said, "Veruca Salt are still writing catchy, raging songs, but the naivety of their intent and its two-decade-old edits are miles away here." Matt Williams of Now Magazine rated the album four stars out of five and stated, "Gordon and Post haven't missed a beat. In fact, they might be better than ever." The A.V. Club's Alex McCown called Ghost Notes "a potent and affecting record, with a deep well of emotional resonance Veruca Salt never really had before."

=== Accolades ===
Publication	Rank	List
AllMusic	N/A	Best Rock Albums of 2015

== Track listing ==
All tracks are written by Veruca Salt.

Ghost Notes
No.	Title	Length
1.	"The Gospel According to Saint Me"	3:49
2.	"Black and Blonde"	4:07
3.	"Eyes on You"	3:17
4.	"Prince of Wales"	5:35
5.	"The Sound of Leaving"	3:32
6.	"Love You Less"	3:09
7.	"Laughing in the Sugar Bowl"	2:16
8.	"Empty Bottle"	5:53
9.	"Come Clean, Dark Thing"	3:22
10.	"I'm Telling You Now"	3:29
11.	"Triage"	3:36
12.	"Lost to Me"	4:10
13.	"The Museum of Broken Relationships"	2:35
14.	"Alternica"	5:58
Total length:		54:48

2016 double LP edition
No.	Title	Length
1.	"Prelude to Zeus"	1:28
2.	"The Gospel According to Saint Me"	3:49
3.	"Black and Blonde"	4:07
4.	"Eyes on You"	3:17
5.	"Prince of Wales"	5:35
6.	"The Sound of Leaving"	3:32
7.	"Love You Less"	3:09
8.	"Laughing in the Sugar Bowl"	2:16
9.	"Empty Bottle"	5:53
10.	"Come Clean, Dark Thing"	3:22
11.	"I'm Telling You Now"	3:29
12.	"Triage"	3:36
13.	"Lost to Me"	4:10
14.	"Into the Sun"	0:34
15.	"The Museum of Broken Relationships"	2:35
16.	"Alternica"	5:58
17.	"Coda"	1:56
Total length:		58:46

== Personnel ==
Credits adapted from AllMusic.

=== Veruca Salt ===
- Louise Post – guitar, vocals
- Nina Gordon – guitar, vocals
- Steve Lack – bass guitar
- Jim Shapiro – drums, vocals (backing)

=== Additional musicians ===
- Kay Hanley – vocals
- Michelle Lewis – vocals
- Christian Lane – vocals (backing)
- Joel Mark – handclapping
- Sophie Mark – handclapping
- Chick Wolverton – percussion

=== Production ===
- Emily Lazar – mastering
- Ken Sluiter – engineer
- Brad Wood – engineer, mixing, orchestra, production

== Charts ==
Chart (2015)	Peak position
US Billboard 200	159
US Top Alternative Albums (Billboard)	11
US Top Rock Albums (Billboard)	15

== Release history ==
Region	Date	Format(s)	Label
United States	July 10, 2015	CD; digital download	El Camino
Australia	July 10, 2015	CD; digital download; vinyl	Warner Bros Records
Region	Date	Format(s)	Label
United States	January 2016	vinyl	El Camino
