= Born Entertainer =

2000 single by Veruca Salt

Single by Veruca Salt

from the album Resolver
- Released: 2000
- Recorded: 2000
- Genre: Alternative
- Songwriter(s): Louise Post

Veruca Salt singles chronology
"Straight" (1997)	"Born Entertainer" (2000)	"Only You Know" (2000)

"Born Entertainer" is the first single from Veruca Salt's 2000 album, Resolver. The song is presumed to be about the departure of Nina Gordon (hinted in the line "She didn't get it so fuck her"). It was released in early 2003 in Australia to promote the Australian release of Resolver. Although it failed to reach the US charts, its video reached #50 in MTV rotation during April 2000.

== Track listing ==
1. "Born Entertainer" - 2:40
2. "Yeah Man" - 3:31
3. "Imperfectly" - 4:18
4. "Born Entertainer" (CD-ROM Video) - 2:44
