= Nicole Fiorentino =

American bass guitarist

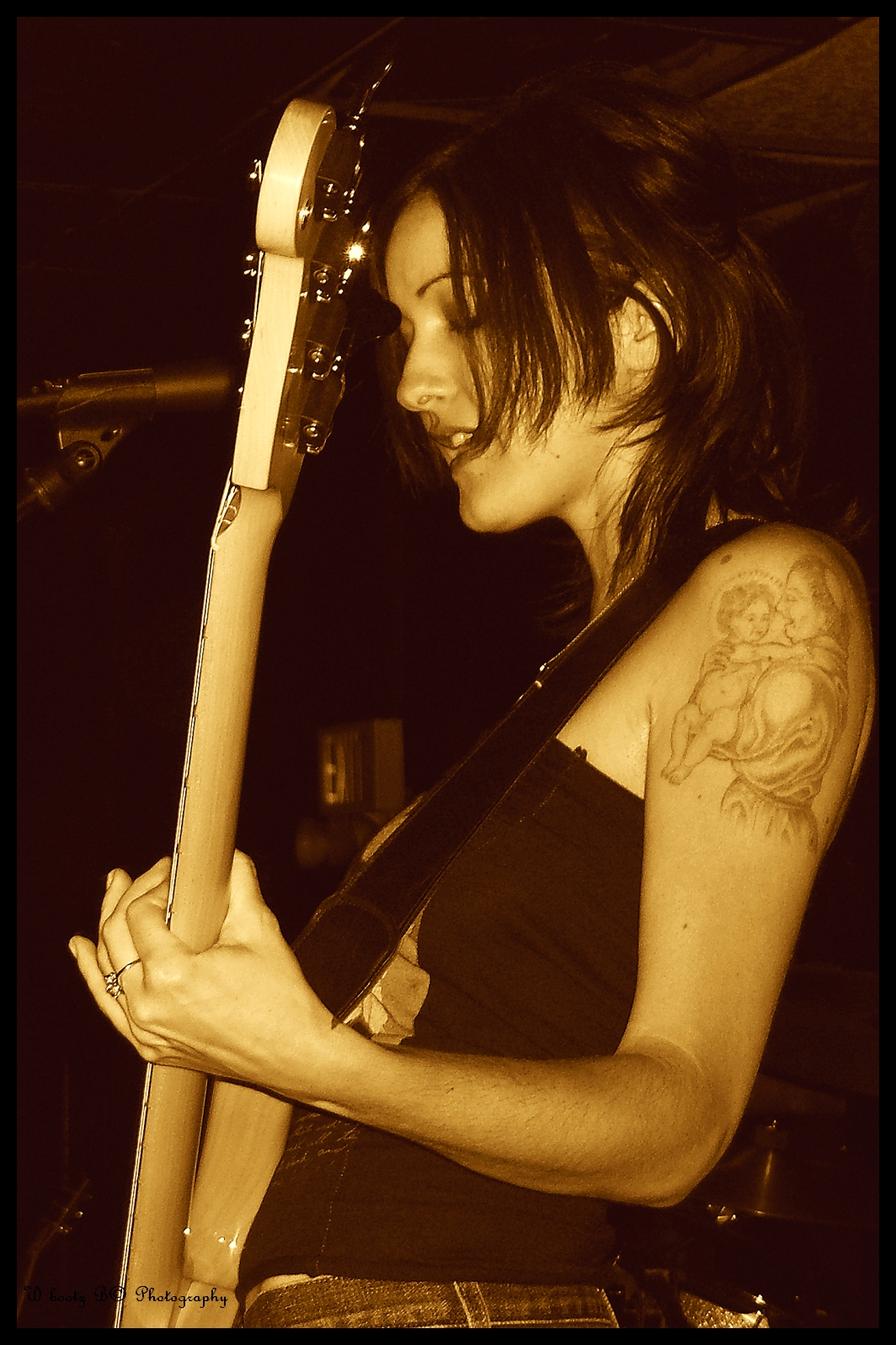
- Fiorentino performing in 2006

Background information
- Born: Nicole Margaret Fiorentino; April 7, 1979 (age 47); Ludlow, Massachusetts, US
- Genres: Alternative rock
- Occupation: Musician
- Instruments: Bass, vocals, keyboards
- Years active: 2006–present

Nicole Margaret Fiorentino (born April 7, 1979) is an American bass guitarist. She is best known for her work with alternative rock bands Veruca Salt and the Smashing Pumpkins. In both bands, she played as a touring member before contributing to albums. She replaced Eva Gardner of Veruca Salt before recording 2006's IV. For the band's final album Ghost Notes in 2015, Fiorentino was replaced by returning founding member Steve Lack, but reappeared on Louise Post's debut solo album Sleepwalker and corresponding tour in 2023. With the Smashing Pumpkins, Fiorentino replaced Ginger Pooley (and her temporary replacement Mark Tulin), she became an official member in 2010. She performs on the band's EP Teargarden by Kaleidyscope (2011) and subsequent album Oceania (2012). Fiorentino departed the band in 2014.

== Biography ==
Fiorentino was born in Ludlow, Massachusetts. Prior to joining the Smashing Pumpkins, she was a member of Radio Vago, Chicago alternative act Veruca Salt, Spinnerette, Twilight Sleep, and Light FM, the last of which opened for Billy Corgan's one-off band Backwards Clock Society in November 2009.

Within a February 17, 2011, post on Smashing Pumpkins' Facebook page, Fiorentino claimed she was one of the girls on the cover of the Pumpkins' 1993 album Siamese Dream. Although it was received by many fans to have been in jest, several news sources and a portion of the fan community believed this to be a genuine claim. Rolling Stone suggested that Corgan had "decided to pull a Twitter prank". Former SmashingPumpkins.com webmaster, Paul Friemel, later claimed that both cover models had been located in 2007 and that neither was Fiorentino.

In 2010, Fiorentino began working with Meghan Toohey under the group name The Cold and Lovely. In 2012 their debut album was released after it was funded through Kickstarter. The album produced one single and video for the song "Not With Me" released on April 24. The following year, on September 24, 2013, The Cold and Lovely released their sophomore record entitled "Ellis Bell EP".

In October 2013, Australian art rock band The Red Paintings announced Fiorentino would be performing with them as part of their new 'Wasps' stage show premiere live on AXS TV, October 7.

Fiorentino spent most of 2014 working with The Cold and Lovely. The group played a SXSW tour, supporting the re-release of their Ellis Bell EP. They recorded a follow-up EP with new songs. They went on a summer tour of the U.S. East Coast. In May 2014, Fiorentino provided backing vocals to London band The Microdance's debut album New Waves of Hope. In the fall of 2014, Fiorentino joined the band Night Terrors of 1927 on their fall tour. In September 2014, Corgan stated in an interview with Alternative Nation that both Fiorentino and bandmate Mike Byrne were no longer members of the Smashing Pumpkins, citing different levels of commitment to the Smashing Pumpkins. However, Fiorentino and Corgan remain on amicable terms.

The Cold and Lovely announced an indefinite hiatus in 2016. That same year she opened a pet-sitting business in Los Angeles to take a break from the music industry grind.

In 2018 she formed a gothic rock band, Bizou, with musicians she played with in previous projects. Speaking of her approach to new music, she said "for the first time in a long time I'm really just doing this for fun". Bizou released their self-titled EP in March 2019, followed by another EP Stilllifeburning (2020) and their debut album Tragic Lover (2021).

Nicole joined Louise Post's touring band in 2023. She appeared in the music video for the song "Guilty".

On February 16, 2025, Fiorentino was announced as the new touring bassist of Garbage for the rest of the year. Garbage members Shirley Manson and Butch Vig both reached out personally to inquire if Fiorentino was interested in the job, with Vig also having previously met her when she was performing with The Smashing Pumpkins.

== Personal life ==
In 2012, Fiorentino married Meghan Toohey, her bandmate in The Cold and Lovely. They have since divorced. Fiorentino, who identifies as queer, did not publicly disclose her sexuality until 2015, saying "The whole time I was in the Smashing Pumpkins, I was very vocal about my feelings on gay rights, but I never discussed it in terms of my own experiences. I just wasn't ready at that point for my own reasons."

== Discography ==
With Veruca Salt

- IV (2006)

With Light FM

- Let There Be Light FM (2009)
- Buzz Kill City (2011)

With The Smashing Pumpkins

- Teargarden by Kaleidyscope stand-alone songs (2011)
- Oceania (2012)
- Oceania: Live in NYC (2013)

With Cold and Lovely

- The Cold and Lovely (2012)
- Ellis Bell EP (2013)
- What Have I Become (2015)

With The Microdance

- New Waves of Hope (2015)

With Bizou

- Bizou EP (2019)
- Stilllifeburning EP (2020)
- Tragic Lover (2021)

With Louise Post

- Sleepwalker (2023)
