= MMXIV (Veruca Salt) =

EP by Veruca Salt
- Released: 19 April 2014
- Genre: Alternative rock
- Length: 9:14
- Label: Minty Fresh
- Producer: Brad Wood

Veruca Salt chronology
| IV (2006) | MMXIV (2014) | Ghost Notes (2015) |

MMXIV is a 2014 EP by Veruca Salt. This is their first release with the original lineup since Eight Arms to Hold You in 1997. It was released on vinyl for Record Store Day 2014. "The Museum of Broken Relationships" was later included on the band's album Ghost Notes (2015).

== Track listing ==
=== V Side ===
1. "The Museum of Broken Relationships"
2. "It's Holy"

=== S Side ===
1. "Seether"

== Personnel ==
- Louise Post – Guitar/Vocals
- Nina Gordon – Guitar/Vocals
- Steve Lack – Bass
- Jim Shapiro – Drums
