= Victrola (disambiguation) =

Victrola may refer to:

== Machines ==
- Victrola, The Victor Talking Machine Company trademark for a brand of spring driven internal horn phonograph

== Titled expressive works ==
- "Victrola", a 1982 short story by Wright Morris
- "Victrola" (song), a song by Veruca Salt from their 1994 album American Thighs

== Other ==
- Victrola, record label RCA Victrola
