= Victrola (song) =

Single by Veruca Salt

from the album American Thighs
- B-side: "My Sharona"; "Sundown" (live)
- Released: June 19, 1995
- Genre: Grunge • pop-punk • rock
- Length: 2:19
- Label: Minty Fresh
- Songwriter: Louise Post
- Producer: John Leonard

Veruca Salt singles chronology
"Number One Blind" (1995)	"Victrola" (1995)	"Volcano Girls" (1997)

"Victrola" is a single by the band Veruca Salt. It was released in 1995 on Minty Fresh Records. It includes a cover of The Knack's "My Sharona".

The cover artwork does not actually depict a Victrola (a brand name of early phonograph with the horn inside a wooden cabinet), but rather an early 20th-century outside horn gramophone or phonograph.

The single was the third release from the album American Thighs but unlike the first two, failed to reach the Top 75 Singles Chart in the UK, peaking at number 88.

== Track listing ==
=== 7" single ===
1. "Victrola" – 2:19
2. "My Sharona" – 4:42

=== CD single ===
1. "Victrola" – 2:19
2. "My Sharona" – 4:42
3. "Sundown" [live] – 3:23

== Charts ==
Chart performance for "Victrola"
Chart (1995–1996)	Peak position
Australia (ARIA)	127
UK Singles (Official Charts)	88

== Personnel ==
- Veruca Salt - artwork
- Brad Wood - engineer, mixing
- John Leonard - producer
- Doug McBride - engineer, mixing
- Nina Gordon - guitar, vocals
- Louise Post - guitar, vocals
- Jim Shapiro - drums
