= Officially Dead =

EP by Veruca Salt
- Released: July 2003 (Mispress - Track 3 mislabeled); September 2003 (Repress - Correct label for Track 3)
- Recorded: March 1999 – January 2002
- Genre: Alternative rock
- Length: 16:00
- Label: Embryo Records

Veruca Salt chronology
Resolver (2000)	Officially Dead (2003)	Lords of Sounds and Lesser Things [EP] (2005)

Officially Dead is an EP by the American alternative rock band Veruca Salt, released in 2003 on Embryo.

The single was released in Australia and peaked at #13 on the Triple J top 100.

The first pressing of the EP contained many errors. For instance, track #3 is mislabeled; it's actually a demo version of the previously unreleased song "Blissful Queen", rather than the listed "Smoke & Mirrors" demo; for the second pressing, the error was corrected & the 3rd track was the correct "Smoke & Mirrors" demo. Louise Post's friend Summer was not credited for the tattoo on the cover until the second pressing. Also, for the second pressing, a lighter artwork color scheme was used.

== Track listing ==
1. "Officially Dead" (Tihista/Post) – 2:49
2. "Straightjacket" (demo) (Post) – 3:52
3. "Blissful Queen" (demo) (Post) – 3:44 [First pressing mislabel as "Smoke & Mirrors" (demo)]/"Smoke & Mirrors" (demo) (Post/Fitzpatrick/Crosley) – 3:55 [Correctly labeled on second pressing]
4. "The Light Behind Your Eyes" (Post) – 2:03
5. "The Same Person" (Remix) (Post) – 3:51

== Personnel ==
- Chad Adams – engineer
- Natalija Brunovs – artwork
- Brian Liesegang – engineer
- Darian Rundall – engineer
