= Only You Know =

Only You Know may refer to:

- "Only You Know", a song by Dion from the 1975 album Born to Be with You
- "Only You Know", a song by Veruca Salt from the 2000 album Resolver
- "Only You Know", a song by Beach House from the 2022 album Once Twice Melody
