= Resolver =

Resolver may refer to:

- Resolver (Cuba), a do-it-yourself ethos in Cuba
- Resolver (electrical), a type of rotary electrical transformer used for measuring degrees of rotation
- Resolver (Veruca Salt album), a 2000 album by the band Veruca Salt
- Resolver (Shinhwa album), an album by the South Korean boy band Shinhwa
- Resolver (DNS), a set of software utilities used to resolve domain names of Internet resources
- Resolver, a specialized microarray data storage and analysis software package developed by Rosetta Biosoftware
- Resolver One, a Python-based spreadsheet
- Resolver (programming)
