= Triple Fast Action =

Alternative rock band

- Origin: Chicago, Illinois, United States
- Genres: Emo, power pop, alternative rock
- Years active: 1995–1998
- Labels: Capitol Records; Deep Elm
- Past members: Wes Kidd; Brian St. Clair; Kevin Tihista; Ronnie Schneider; Scott Lucas

Triple Fast Action (sometimes stylized as tripl3fastaction) was an indie rock/alternative rock band started by Wes Kidd and Brian St. Clair, both previous members of Chicago band Rights of the Accused, in 1995. Kidd went on to manage such bands as Cheap Trick, The Damnwells and bandmate Kevin Tihista while working for New York–based Silent Partner Management. St. Clair joined the band Local H after stints as tour manager for Chicago's Liz Phair and served as drum tech for Bun E. Carlos of Cheap Trick. Triple Fast Action member Kevin Tihista released several of his own solo albums after the band's breakup.

Triple Fast Action was one of many Chicago area acts signed to Capitol Records during the multi-year label frenzy that also snatched up the Smashing Pumpkins, Smoking Popes, Fig Dish, Loud Lucy, Veruca Salt, Red Red Meat, Certain Distant Suns, Liz Phair, The Lupins, Hum, Seam, Menthol, Urge Overkill, Stabbing Westward and Cupcakes among others. The band supported such notable acts as Everclear, Lenny Kravitz, The Wallflowers and Veruca Salt over the course of its existence. The band's first release, Broadcaster, was referred to as "Cheap Trick meets Nirvana" and featured power-pop two-toned guitar crunch and a stunning power backbeat. The album sold poorly despite extensive touring in the U.S. due to limited label support.

The group left Capitol and signed with the then-NY-based indie label of John Szuch's (now based in Charlotte, NC) Deep Elm Records (Nada Surf, Brandtson, Pave the Rocket and Camber) to release the critically acclaimed Cattlemen Don't. The first single, "Heroes" received some college radio airplay and won several nights of local WKQX FM's battle of the songs. A farewell concert was performed at Chicago's Metro on May 24, 1998.

Notable fans of the band include Dave Grohl of Nirvana/Foo Fighters, who lists a show of Rights of the Accused as his first concert. Grohl and fellow Foo Fighters listened repeatedly to the band's Broadcaster during their recording of The Colour and the Shape. Wes Kidd made several demos available to fans and friends via home-burned CD.

== Line up ==
- Wes Kidd - vocals and guitar
- Brian St. Clair - drums
- Ronnie Schneider - guitar
- Kevin Tihista - bass
- Scott Lucas - additional guitar (played as part-time relief for Ronnie Schneider)

== Discography ==
- Broadcaster (Capitol Records, 1996)
- Cattlemen Don't (Deep Elm Records, 1997)
