= Blow It Out Your Ass It's Veruca Salt =

EP by Veruca Salt
- Released: April 16, 1996
- Recorded: 1996
- Genre: Grunge; punk rock
- Length: 19:08
- Label: DGC/Minty Fresh
- Producer: Steve Albini

Veruca Salt chronology
American Thighs (1994)	Blow It Out Your Ass It's Veruca Salt (1996)	Eight Arms to Hold You (1997)

Professional ratings
Review scores
Source	Rating
AllMusic	2.5/5 stars
Christgau's Consumer Guide	(3-star Honorable Mention)
The Encyclopedia of Popular Music	3/5 stars
Entertainment Weekly	B
MusicHound Rock	3/5 stars

Blow It Out Your Ass It's Veruca Salt is an EP by Veruca Salt released on April 16, 1996. It followed the band's hit album American Thighs (1994). The EP contains four songs, two written by Nina Gordon and two by Louise Post.

The album art shows the band dressed in toilet paper. In the liner notes, bassist Steve Lack is credited under his actual name, Stephen J. Lackiewicz.

== Track listing ==
1. "Shimmer Like a Girl" (Nina Gordon) – 4:03
2. "I'm Taking Europe with Me" (Louise Post) – 3:45
3. "New York Mining Disaster 1996" (Gordon) – 4:56
4. "Disinherit" (Post) – 6:25

== Personnel ==
- Louise Post – guitar, vocals
- Nina Gordon – guitar, vocals
- Steve Lack – bass guitar
- Jim Shapiro – drums, vocals
- Steve Albini – producer
- John Golden – mastering
- Paul Elledge – photographer

== Usage in popular culture ==
"Shimmer Like a Girl" is often used as the main theme song for Shimmer Women Athletes, a Chicago-based all-female wrestling promotion.

"I'm Taking Europe with Me" was featured in the closing credits for Matthew Bright's motion picture Freeway II: Confessions of a Trickbaby.

== Charts ==
Chart (1996)	Peak position
Australia (ARIA)	194
