= Gary Kordan =

American TV production designer

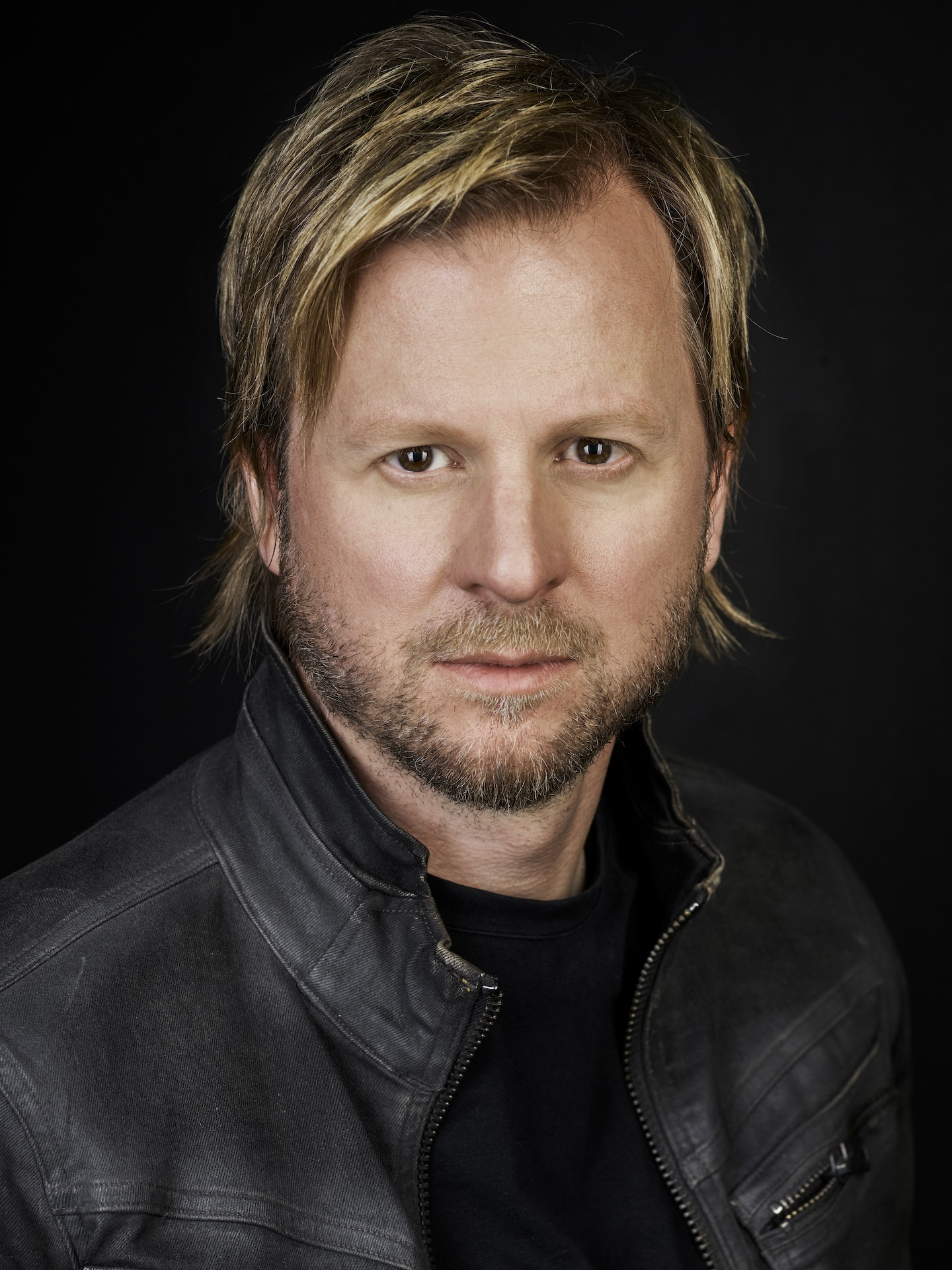
Gary Kordan Production Designer

Gary Kordan is an American production designer and television producer. He was nominated for an Emmy Award for his work on the fifth and final season of Key & Peele.

== Career ==
In 2016, Kordan won an Art Directors Guild Award, a Peabody Award and was nominated for a Primetime Emmy for his work on the hit series Key & Peele starring Keegan Michael-Key and Jordan Peele. Additionally, he was the first Production Designer on the West Coast to design an Amazon series, Betas, and the second designer overall for Amazon Studios.

In addition to the entire 54-episode run of the Emmy and Peabody Award winning Key & Peele, some of Kordan's production design credits include: The Prank Panel starring Johnny Knoxville, Eric André and Gabourey Sidibe (ABC), Kenan starring Kenan Thompson and Don Johnson (NBC), Miracle Workers starring Daniel Radcliffe and Steve Buscemi (Max), Downward Dog (ABC), Ghosted starring Adam Scott and Craig Robinson (FOX), Jordan Peele's Weird City (YouTube), Crank Yankers (Comedy Central), Time Traveling Bong starring Broad City's Ilana Glazer (Comedy Central), The Meltdown with Jonah & Kumail (Comedy Central), @midnight (Comedy Central), Workaholics starring Blake Anderson, Adam Devine and Anders Holm, Reggie Watts: Spatial (Netflix), Fred Armisen's Netflix special "For Drummers Only", The New Negroes with Baron Vaughn & Open Mike Eagle (Comedy Central), Melissa McCarthy's Nobodies, the feature film What Now? starring Kevin Hart (Universal), Just Add Magic, Betas (Amazon Prime), Patton Oswalt: Tragedy Plus Comedy Equals Time (Epix), Teachers (TV Land), Those Who Can't (TruTV), Just Add Magic: Mystery City (Amazon Prime), For The Cultura (Quibi), 2022 Emmy Nomination for Outstanding Art Direction, The Barbarian and the Troll (Nickelodeon) and 2026 Art Directors Guild Award Nomination and Webby Award win for Atsuko Okatuska: Father (Hulu).

He also co-created and executive produced E!'s Number 1 Single with Lisa Loeb (E! Entertainment), directed two music videos for the alternative rock band Veruca Salt and wrote jokes for Joan Rivers, one of his many professional and personal collaborations with the comedy legend. Gary spent the fall and winter of 2002 in Paris as a writer for the massive reality hit Fox's dating show Joe Millionaire (FOX), its finale beating the Super Bowl ratings with 42.6 million viewers. In 2017 he followed Ike Turner with a camera, documenting the final months of his life which resulted in hours of footage, some of which was used in the critically acclaimed HBO Documentary 'Tina'.

In front of the camera, Kordan produced and hosted two public access shows on Manhattan Neighborhood Network, both resulting in a cult following, co-hosted Treasures In Your Home, a nightly live eBay style talk show that very often surpassed Late Night with David Letterman in many markets, and in 2000 was the red carpet arrivals host for the first 'X-Men' film on Ellis Island.

Kordan's life in art and comedy began at a very early age, drawing portraits and caricatures of everyone he knew and working as a doorman at the legendary Catch A Rising Star comedy club. He went on to study Fine Arts and Illustration at School of Visual Arts in New York City, and during his junior year landed full-time job working for Joan Rivers on her daytime talk show, CBS's The Joan Rivers Show. It was there, and because of Joan's encouragement, Gary began his career in the art department.

Gary is a member of the Art Directors Guild Local 800, a Daytime Emmy Judge, a member of the Television Academy Peer Group Executive Committee, Moderator of the first ever Television Academy Peer Circle Program, appeared on numerous Comic-Con and WonderCon panels and resides in Los Angeles with his photographer wife, Justine Ungaro. Together they owned 'Muse, Studio City', a creative home to photo, film and music video shoots, commercials, retail pop-ups, fundraisers and too many parties to count. Notable events included intimate concerts by Lisa Loeb, Letters To Cleo, Steve Kilby (The Church), Amanda Kramer (The Psychedelic Furs), Lou Barlow (Dinosaur Jr, Sebadoh), Tommy Stinson (The Replacements), Campfire Cassettes, Kay Hanley (Letters To Cleo), 'Rex Manning Day' featuring bands and actors from the film 'Empire Records', Olivia Sanabia (Just Add Magic), Alex Wassabi, David Poe, Joey Santiago (Pixies) and Danny Zucker & Timothy Simons (Veep) reading 'Trump Tweets'.

Fundraisers at 'Muse, Studio City' raised money for the Hurricane Harvey Relief, the Puerto Rico Hurricane, Music Cares, Cookies For Kids Cancer and Valley Community Fundraisers among many others. Classes offered included Calligraphy, Hair Braiding, Loom Weaving, The Art of Paper Flowers, and Watercolor Lettering.

In 2022, Justine and Gary moved 'Muse, Studio City' from its Ventura Blvd. location and launched three photo and film studios with stylish standing sets, including a storefront/ event space in Los Angeles all under the new name 'StuSpaceLA'.

== Awards ==
In 2015, Kordan was nominated for an Art Directors Guild Award for his work on Key & Peele. In 2016, he was nominated once again for Key & Peele and won. In 2016 Kordan was nominated for an Emmy Award for his work on the final season of Key & Peele in addition to winning a Peabody Award. Gary was nominated for a 2022 Emmy Award for The Barbarian and the Troll for Outstanding Art Direction and most was most recently nominated for an Art Directors Guild Award and won a Webby Award for the Hulu stand-up special Atsuko Okatsuka: Father.

== Filmography ==
Year	Title	Notes
2025	Atsuko Okatsuka: Father	Production designer
2023	Miracle Workers	Production designer
2023	The Prank Panel	Production designer
2022	Atsuko Okatsuka: The Intruder	Production designer
2021	The Barbarian and The Troll	Production designer
2021	Kenan	Production designer
2020	Let's Go, Atsuko!	Production designer
2020	Just Add Magic: Mystery City	Production designer
2019-2021	Crank Yankers	Production designer, Co-Producer
2019	Comedy Central Roast: Alec Baldwin	Segment Production designer
2019	The New Negroes	Production designer
2019	Weird City	Production designer
2017	Ghosted	Production designer
2017	Truth & Iliza	Production designer
2017	Downward Dog	Production designer
2017	Nobodies	Production designer
2016	Untitled Weeks/Mackay Project	Production designer
2016	Reggie Watts: Spatial	Production designer
2016	Kevin Hart: What Now?	Production designer
2016	Time Traveling Bong	Production designer
2016	Those Who Can't	Production designer
2016-20117	Teachers	Production designer
2016	Idiot Sitter	Production designer
2015-2016	Just Add Magic	Production designer
2012-2015	Key & Peele	Production designer
2014-2016	The Meltdown with Jonah and Kumail	Production designer
2013-2015	@midnight	Production designer
2015	Salem Rogers	Production designer
2014	Gettin' Some Strange with Kurt Braunohler	Production designer
2013-2014	Quick Draw	Production designer
2013-2014	Betas	Production designer
2014	Patton Oswalt: Tragedy Plus Comedy Equals Time	Production designer
2009-2014	Shark Tank	Art director
2013	Adam DeVine's House Party	Production designer
2011-2013	Workaholics	Production designer
2012	Megawinner	Production designer
2012	Workaholics: The Other Cubicle	Production designer
2011	Shredd	Production designer
2011	Sports Show with Norm Macdonald	Art director
2011	JailBait	Production designer
2011	The Boys and Girls Guide to Getting Down	Production designer
2010	Alabama	Production designer
2010	Back Nine	Production designer
2010	Savage Love	Production designer
2010	Thintervention with Jackie Warner	Production designer
2010	Instant Recall	Production designer
2010	Curb: The Discussion	Production designer
2010	Untitled Burr and Hart Project	Production designer
2009	The League	Production designer
2009	Dogg After Dark	Production designer
2009	Top Chef Masters	Art director
2008	Chocolate News	Production Designer
2008	Man Stroke Woman	Production Designer
2008	Cheech & Chong: Roasted	Art director
2008	Root of All Evil	Art director
2008	The McCaingels	Production Designer
2008	Scream Queens	Production designer
2008	Dan's Detour to Life	Production designer
2008	Guinness World Records Live: Top 100	Production designer
2005-2008	Mind of Mencia	Art director / Production Designer
2007	Temptation	Art director
2007	Talkshow with Spike Feresten	Art director
2006	Number 1 Single	Producer / Co-Creator
2006	VIP Passport	Production Designer
2003	Shock Video 2004: Too Hot for the Box	Production designer
2003	Joe Millionaire	Host writer
2003	House of Clues	Props department
1999	Door Knock Dinners	Production Designer
1997	The Rosie O'Donnell Show	Tattoo artist
1995	Can We Shop?	Set decorator
1989-1993	The Joan Rivers Show	Production assistant
