= Number One Blind =

Single by Veruca Salt

from the album American Thighs
- B-side: "Bodies", "Aurora"
- Released: January 23, 1995
- Genre: Alternative rock, grunge
- Length: 3:45
- Label: Minty Fresh
- Songwriter(s): Nina Gordon, Jim Shapiro
- Producer(s): Brad Wood, Doug McBride

Veruca Salt singles chronology
"Seether" / "All Hail Me" (1994)	"Number One Blind" (1995)	"Victrola" (1995)

"Number One Blind" is a song by Veruca Salt. It was released previously on the album American Thighs.

== Background ==
It was written by Nina Gordon and Jim Shapiro. The song references the window blind manufacturer Levolor in the chorus. The music video for the song was directed by Steve Hanft, but the band was unhappy with the result and pulled it from MTV circulation.

== Track listing ==
1. "Number One Blind" (Gordon/Shapiro) – 3:45
2. "Bodies" (Cover of Bodies by the Sex Pistols) (Cook/Jones/Vicious/Rotten) – 4:10
3. "Aurora" (Gordon) – 4:06

== Personnel ==
- Nina Gordon – guitar, vocals
- Steve Lack – bass
- Louise Post – guitar, vocals
- Jim Shapiro – drums, background vocals
- Brad Wood – engineer
- Doug McBride – engineer

== Charts ==
Chart performance for "Number One Blind"
Chart (1995)	Peak position
Australia (ARIA)	106
UK Singles (OCC)	68
