= Volcano Girls =

Single by Veruca Salt

from the album Eight Arms to Hold You
- Released: 1997
- Recorded: 1997
- Genre: Alternative rock
- Length: 3:18
- Label: Geffen
- Songwriter: Nina Gordon
- Producer: Bob Rock

Veruca Salt singles chronology
"Victrola" (1995)	"Volcano Girls" (1997)	"Shutterbug" (1997)

Music video
- "Volcano Girls"

"Volcano Girls" is a single by the American alternative rock band Veruca Salt, released in 1997 on their album Eight Arms to Hold You.

== Background ==
It was written by Nina Gordon who also sang lead vocals, with Louise Post performing backup vocals. "Volcano Girls" features a partial interpolation of the lyrics to The Beatles' "Glass Onion", and also includes a reference and reprise to Veruca Salt's earlier single "Seether".

== Music video ==
The highly energetic music video for "Volcano Girls" was shot over two days at Essenay in Chicago, Illinois, in 1997. This video consists of the band in the central arena attached to bungee cords, on which Post (right side and airborne), Nina Gordon (left side and performing), and other band members bounce erratically. The video also shows Post and Gordon performing the song while a camera circles around them. Surrounding this arena stand a group of fans, watching them perform several takes of the song.

== Charts ==
Chart performance for "Volcano Girls"
Chart (1997)	Peak position
Australia (ARIA)	47
Canada Alternative 30 (RPM)	4
Iceland (Íslenski Listinn Topp 40)	35
Sweden (Sverigetopplistan)	32
UK Singles (Official Charts)	56
US Billboard Modern Rock Tracks	8
US Billboard Mainstream Rock Tracks	9
Canada Top Singles (RPM)	25

== In media ==
"Volcano Girls" was used at the beginning of the 1999 dark comedy movie Jawbreaker. The song was also featured as a playable track in the 2008 video game Guitar Hero On Tour: Decades.

The song was featured prominently in "A Force to Be Reckoned With", a 2026 episode of the Disney Plus animated series X-Men '97, as the soundtrack for an action sequence with the superhero Jubilee.
