= Bleeding Heart Graffiti =

Studio album by Nina Gordon
- Released: August 8, 2006
- Recorded: 2005
- Genre: Rock
- Length: 47:35
- Label: Warner Bros.
- Producer: Bob Rock

Nina Gordon chronology
Tonight and the Rest of My Life (2000)	Bleeding Heart Graffiti (2006)

Professional ratings
Review scores
Source	Rating
AllMusic	2/5 stars
IGN	5.1/10
Jam!	2/5 stars
Music Box	3/5 stars
Melodic.net	3.5/5 stars
PopMatters	5/10
RocknWorld	3.5/5 stars
Silent Uproar	4/5 stars
Slant Magazine	4/5 stars
Sun Media	1.5/5 stars

Bleeding Heart Graffiti is the second studio album by American singer-songwriter Nina Gordon and marks her third album produced by Bob Rock. It peaked at number 30 on the Billboard Top Heatseekers Albums chart. Nine of the songs on the album are re-recorded tracks from Gordon's self-shelved album Even the Sunbeams. "The Time Comes" was featured in the Bones episode "The Priest in the Churchyard".

== Track listing ==
1. "Bleeding Heart Graffiti" (Gordon) – 0:42
2. "Christmas Lights" (Gordon) – 5:13
3. "Kiss Me 'Til It Bleeds" (Gordon, Russo, Jaye) – 4:09
4. "Suffragette" (Gordon, S. Melvoin, W. Melvoin) – 3:37
5. "This Was the Year" (Gordon) – 0:32
6. "Don't Let Me Down" (Gordon) – 4:14
7. "Pure" (Gordon) – 4:29
8. "Watercolors" (Gordon) – 3:25
9. "Superstar" (Gordon) – 3:15
10. "Turn on Your Radio" (Gordon) – 4:05
11. "When You Don't Want Me Anymore" (Gordon) – 4:03
12. "Bones and a Name" (Gordon) – 4:55
13. "The Time Comes" (Gordon) – 4:19
14. "The Crickets Sound Like Sleigh Bells" (Gordon) – 0:37
15. "Tonight and the Rest of My Life [Acoustic Version](iTunes Bonus)" (Gordon) – 4:40

== Personnel ==
- Peter Bradley Adams – piano
- Jamie Edwards – guitar, piano
- Wendy Melvoin – bass, guitar
- Joel Shearer – guitar
- Tom Morello – guitar
- Paul Bushnell – bass
- Josh Freese – drums
- Abe Laboriel Jr. – drums
- Sean Nelson – drums
- Joey Waronker – drums
- Bob Rock – guitar, producer
- Jeff Russo – bass, guitar, engineer
- Chris Reynolds – assistant engineer
- Eric Helmkamp – engineer
- Jens – mixing
- Rachel Salmon – illustrations
- Melanie Nissen – photography
- Stephen Walker – art direction, cover layout

== Singles ==
Year	Single
2006	Kiss Me 'Til It Bleeds

== Non-album tracks ==
The only known b-side from this recording session is The Blue Hour, which has yet to get an official release, but was leaked to the Internet. Nina also put the demos for A Different Song, Down and Dirty and Someday Is Too Far Away on her official site, which are from this album's recording sessions.
