= Tonight and the Rest of My Life =

Studio album by Nina Gordon
- Released: June 27, 2000
- Recorded: 1998
- Genre: Rock
- Length: 50:39
- Label: Warner Bros.
- Producer: Bob Rock

Nina Gordon chronology
Tonight and the Rest of My Life (2000)	Bleeding Heart Graffiti (2006)

Singles from Tonight and the Rest of My Life
- 1. "Tonight and the Rest of My Life" Released: June 5, 2000; 2. "Now I Can Die" Released: January 23, 2001; 3. "2003" Released: August 15, 2001

Professional ratings
Review scores
Source	Rating
AllMusic	4/5 stars
Entertainment Weekly	C−
PopMatters	(mixed)
Rolling Stone	3/5 stars
The Rolling Stone Album Guide	2.5/5 stars
The Village Voice	(dud)

Tonight and the Rest of My Life is the debut studio album by Veruca Salt co-founder Nina Gordon, released on June 27, 2000. The album was recorded with Bob Rock at his Maui recording studio.

== Singles ==
In 2000, "Tonight and the Rest of My Life" peaked at number 7 on Billboard's Adult Top 40 chart. It also peaked at number 9 on the Billboard Adult Top 40 Recurrent chart. The single charted on the Billboard Bubbling Under Hot 100 Singles chart in September 2000 for four weeks and was played on pop radio heavily in the late summer and early fall of 2000. MTV and VH1 put the video for "Tonight and the Rest of My Life" into constant rotation around the same time. In Australia, "Tonight and the Rest of My Life" peaked at number 123 on the ARIA Singles Chart.

In 2001, "Now I Can Die" peaked at number 29 on Billboard's Adult Top 40 chart and remained on the chart for 10 weeks. VH1 also played the music video.

== Non-album tracks ==
These tracks were recorded for the album but were not included in the final release.

- "Alone with You"
- "Black and Blonde (Original Edit)"
- "Like It Happens Everyday"
- "Unsafe at Any Speed"

These tracks can be heard on Gordon's official website, and "Alone with You" appears on the compilation album Abrazos 2005.

Tonight and the Rest of My Life was recorded while Gordon was signed to Outpost Records, a label owned by Geffen Records, following her departure from Veruca Salt in 1998. In 1999, Outpost Records folded and Gordon was left without a label; shortly after, she signed with Warner Bros. Records.

The original Tonight and the Rest of My Life track list on Outpost Records was:

1. "Tonight and the Rest of My Life" (Gordon) – 5:14
2. "Now I Can Die" (Gordon) – 3:07
3. "2003" (Gordon) – 4:05
4. "Badway" (Gordon) – 3:08
5. "Horses in the City" (Gordon) – 4:08
6. "Hold On to Me" (Gordon) – 4:05
7. "New Year's Eve" (Gordon) – 3:28
8. "Fade to Black" (Gordon) – 4:07
9. "Number One Camera" (Gordon) – 2:58
10. "Got Me Down" (Gordon) – 4:05
11. "Black and Blonde" (Gordon) – 4:23
12. "Too Slow To Ride" (Gordon) – 3:49
13. "Hate Your Way" (Gordon) – 4:46

"Black and Blonde" was removed from the album because Gordon felt it was a mean song about someone she didn't want to be mean to anymore. "The End of the World," a last-minute recording Gordon did while recording with then boyfriend Stacy Jones' band American Hi-Fi, replaced it. A new recording of this song with revised lyrics was included on Ghost Notes, the 2015 album by the reunited Gordon/Post/Lack/Shapiro lineup of Veruca Salt.

The singles for Tonight and the Rest of My Life also changed numerous times. When Outpost Records was in the initial stages of promoting the album, the label stated that the first single would be "Horses in the City". After Gordon moved to Warner Bros. Records, promo singles were circulated for the song "Now I Can Die" in March 2000, before the album's June 27 release date. One month later, she stated that the first single would be "Tonight and the Rest of My Life", which was released on June 5, 2000. "Hold On to Me" and "Now I Can Die" were the lead contenders for the second single, though "2003" and "Got Me Down" were also considered.

The album peaked at number 123 on the Billboard 200 chart, remaining on the chart for 10 weeks. The album also peaked at number one on Billboard's Heatseekers Albums chart, remaining for 26 weeks and into 2001. The album was highly successful regionally, staying on the Billboard Northeast Heatseekers chart for 16 weeks. The lead single "Tonight and the Rest of My Life" received heavy airplay on Adult Top 40 and Top 40 radio stations throughout the Northeast. The album also charted on several other Billboard regional charts, remaining on the Pacific Heatseekers chart for 8 weeks, the West North Central Heatseekers chart for 13 weeks, the Mountain Heatseekers chart for 14 weeks, and the Middle Atlantic Heatseekers chart for 9 weeks. In the United States, the album sold 350,000 copies.

== Track listing ==
All tracks are written by Nina Gordon, except where noted.

No.	Title	Length
1.	"Now I Can Die"	3:07
2.	"2003"	4:05
3.	"Tonight and the Rest of My Life"	5:14
4.	"Badway"	3:08
5.	"Horses in the City"	4:08
6.	"Hold On to Me"	4:05
7.	"New Year's Eve"	3:28
8.	"Fade to Black"	4:07
9.	"Number One Camera"	2:58
10.	"Got Me Down"	4:05
11.	"Too Slow To Ride"	3:49
12.	"Hate Your Way"	4:46
13.	"The End of the World"" (writers: Sylvia Dee, Arthur Kent)	3:39
14.	"Black and Blonde" (iTunes and Japanese bonus track)	4:23
Total length:		50:39

== Personnel ==
- Nina Gordon – electric guitar, acoustic guitar, vocals
- Bob Rock – electric guitar, acoustic guitar, bass guitar
- Jim Shapiro – electric guitar, acoustic guitar, mellotron
- Jon Brion – electric guitar, acoustic guitar, pedal steel, bass guitars, organ, chamberlin
- John Webster – acoustic guitar, Wurlitzer electric piano, chamberlin, mellotron, organ
- Scott Riebling – bass guitar
- Stacy Jones – electric guitar, acoustic guitar, drums, percussion

== Charts ==
Chart (2000)	Peak position
US Billboard 200	123
US Heatseekers Albums (Billboard)	1
