= Fig Dish =

American alternative rock band

- Origin: Chicago, Illinois
- Genres: Alternative rock
- Years active: 1991–1998, 2024–present
- Labels: A&M, Forge Again Records
- Members: Blake Smith; Rick Ness; Mike Willison; Andy Hamilton
- Past members: Bill Swartz; Brian Nolan; Gustavo Lovato

Fig Dish is a 1990s rock band based in Chicago. The band signed to PolyGram Records in 1995 and released two full-length albums before becoming inactive in 1998. In 2024, they released their third full-length album, Feels Like the Very First Two Times, culled from demos recorded in the late '90s.

== Description ==
Fig Dish's sound was influenced by '80s college rock and indie bands such as Dinosaur Jr. and The Replacements, and has drawn comparisons to Cheap Trick. They were part of a mid-90s Chicago rock scene that included The Smashing Pumpkins, Veruca Salt, and Local H. They were closely associated and often shared bills with those and other Chicago acts such as Triple Fast Action, Smoking Popes, and Hushdrops. The band's name was said to have been chosen for its resemblance, when pronounced, to the vulgar German phrase fick dich.

That's What Love Songs Often Do, Fig Dish's 1995 major-label debut album which had been out of print for years, was re-released in April 2013. Chicago Magazine wrote that the band was a "folkloric Chicago outfit," and quoted Blake Smith's summary of the band's career: "We were too busy being the underdog Midwestern raging partying guys, and it killed us.... We just weren’t very good at playing the game, and we drank a lot back in those days." The band reportedly "blew their first big chance at a signing when they opted to play an entire set of Neil Diamond covers at an A&R showcase at the now-defunct Avalon nightclub."

Live shows by Fig Dish in Chicago became popular with a small devoted fan base due to the inclusion of goofy banter and audience interaction, and an apparent embrace of a drunken rock club party atmosphere. Fig Dish participated in the first and many subsequent Halloween shows at Chicago's Double Door. Some live shows included an encore of classic rock numbers that showcased guest vocalist Wes Kidd of Triple Fast Action, who performed apparently intoxicated and dressed in a pink bunny suit.

In September 1998, the band broke with their recording label, A&M Records. According to Rolling Stone, the band considered its lack of widespread recognition to be the fault of the label's "zero effort" to provide exposure outside of Chicago, concluding, "The final straw was an estimated $80,000 soft-porn music video the quartet made for the single 'When Shirts Get Tight,' which featured a handful of elite porn stars. The band reportedly picked up the tab for both clean and dirty versions of the video, but neither of them received any airplay on MTV." In contrast to the comedic video, the song's lyrics showcased the depth of the band's musical knowledge with lines quoted from Game Theory's song "Friend of the Family," from Real Nighttime (1985).

== Musical careers after Fig Dish ==
Several members of Fig Dish have gone on to form or work with other bands:

- Blake Smith and Mike Willison formed Caviar in 1999. They later joined forces with Local H frontman Scott Lucas in the electronica project The Prairie Cartel. As of 2015, Smith was the lead singer for Chicago-based noise-pop band Forgotten Species, which released its debut EP, Hades Fades, in January 2015.
- Rick Ness went on to play with The Cells and The Webb Brothers. He also started his own project, Ness, with Veruca Salt's Jim Shapiro.
- Bill Swartz was also a member of Ness, along with John San Juan from The Hushdrops, and Jonny Polonsky.
- Brian Nolan joined drummer Stacy Jones in 1998 to form BMX Girl, which later became American Hi-Fi.

== Members ==
- Blake Smith - Guitars and vocals
- Rick Ness - Guitars and vocals
- Mike Willison - Bass and vocals
- Andy Hamilton - Drums (That's What Love Songs Often Do, 1995)
- Bill Swartz - Drums (When Shove Goes Back To Push, 1997)
- Brian Nolan - Drums
- Gustavo Lovato - Bass and vocals (pre-Polygram)

== Discography ==
- Unleash the Cracken (Touchy-Feely Records, 1991)
- "Rollover, Please" b/w "Miss California" (7" single, 1993)
- "Nimble" b/w "Bury Me" (7" single, 1993)
- That's What Love Songs Often Do (1995)
- When Shove Goes Back To Push (1997)
- Feels Like The Very First Two Times (2024, recorded 1998)
