= That's What Love Songs Often Do =

Studio album by Fig Dish
- Released: 1995
- Genre: Rock
- Label: Atlas
- Producer: Lou Giordano

Fig Dish chronology
Unleash the Cracken (1991)	That's What Love Songs Often Do (1995)	When Shove Goes Back to Push (1997)

That's What Love Songs Often Do is an album by the American band Fig Dish, released in 1995. "Seeds" and "Bury Me" were released as singles. That's What Love Songs Often Do was a commercial disappointment. The band supported it with a North American tour.

== Production ==
The band recorded the album in three weeks, immediately after being signed by Polydor Records. It was produced by Lou Giordano.

== Critical reception ==
Professional ratings
Review scores
Source	Rating
Albuquerque Journal	3/4 stars
AllMusic	3/5 stars
Chicago Tribune	2.5/4 stars
Daily Herald	3/4 stars
The Encyclopedia of Popular Music	3/5 stars
Houston Press	3/5 stars
MusicHound Rock: The Essential Album Guide	2.5/5 stars

The Morning Call called the album "an exemplary collection of modern-day Chicago rock," writing that "the strong guitar melodies of Blake Smith and Rick Ness complement their equally intricate vocal melodies, and the tongue-in-cheek approach taken to hint at the horrid keeps the recording fun, never tedious." Trouser Press wrote: "Able to conjure up a potent haze of slacker sloth and then obliterate it with a fierce rock assault (see 'It’s Your Ceiling' for a concise demonstration), Fig Dish keeps attitude out of the effort, concentrating on simply effective tunes."

CMJ New Music Monthly deemed it "a respectably tight-fisted punch of buzzing guitar caterwaul." The Chicago Tribune called it "a minor revelation," and praised the "sturdy melodies, concisely and smartly arranged." The Washington Post judged That's What Love Songs Often Do to be "lively pop-grunge with more than a touch of Nirvana's swirling feedback and woozy despair."

AllMusic wrote that the album delivers "solid alternative pop with a big guitar sound." In a retrospective feature, the Riverfront Times called "Bury Me" "a sub-three-minute nerd-rock waltz with interesting arrangements (i.e., a bridge that slows down dramatically, before speeding up again in a drumming fury) and the plaintive (and effective) call, 'Wanna be with you!'"

== Track listing ==
No.	Title	Length
1.	"Bury Me"
2.	"Weak and Mean"
3.	"Seeds"
4.	"Chew Toy"
5.	"Nimble"
6.	"Wrong Nothing"
7.	"Quiet Storm King"
8.	"Going Gone"
9.	"Lemonader"
10.	"Rollover, Please"
11.	"It's Your Ceiling"
12.	"Resistance Is Futile"
13.	"First History"
