= Lords of Sounds and Lesser Things =

EP by Veruca Salt
- Released: November 30, 2004
- Genre: Alternative rock
- Length: 20:01
- Label: Velveteen
- Producer: Rae Dileo

Veruca Salt chronology
Officially Dead [EP] (2003)	Lords of Sounds and Lesser Things (2004)	IV (2006)

Lords of Sounds and Lesser Things is a 2005 EP released independently by the American alternative rock band Veruca Salt and self-distributed through their Velveteen Records label.

The EP features five new songs and a recording of Richard Patrick of Filter repeatedly yelling "I got my pants on!" Two of the songs (Save You and The Sun) were re-recorded for the band's fourth full-length record, IV. The EP was released in order to introduce fans to songs they intended on playing during their 2005 tour. It was initially released only via the band on tour or their website however it can now be found on most major online distributors.

== Track listing ==
1. "Save You" (Louise Post, Stephen Fitzpatrick) – 4:27
2. "Blood on My Hands" (Post, Fitzpatrick) – 3:30
3. "The Sun" (Post, Fitzpatrick) – 4:04
4. "I Got My Pants On" – 0:24
  - Samples: Richard Patrick of Filter
5. "Firefly" (Post) – 3:28
6. "For Days" (Post) – 4:08

== Personnel ==
- Louise Post – vocals, guitar
- Stephen Fitzpatrick – guitar
- Solomon Snyder – bass guitar
- Michael Miley – drums
