= Seether (song) =

1994 single by Veruca Salt

- US vinyl single standard artwork

Single by Veruca Salt

from the album American Thighs
- B-side: "All Hail Me"
- Released: March 1994
- Genre: Alternative rock; grunge; bubblegum
- Length: 3:16
- Label: Minty Fresh
- Songwriter: Nina Gordon
- Producer: Brad Wood

Veruca Salt singles chronology
"Seether" (1994)	"Number One Blind" (1995)

Alternative cover art
- Additional UK artwork used for the 7-inch and CD singles

Music video
- "Seether" on YouTube

"Seether" is a song by American alternative rock band Veruca Salt, released as the lead single from their first studio album, American Thighs, in March 1994. Along with 1997's "Volcano Girls", "Seether" became the band's highest-charting hit on the US Billboard Modern Rock Tracks chart, peaking at number eight. The title inspired the name for South African rock band Seether.

== Background ==
The song was written by Veruca Salt singer-guitarist Nina Gordon. "Seether" was more pop-sounding compared to the rest of the band's material. In a 1994 interview with MuchMusic, an interviewer suggested that "Seether" could either be about female "animalistic instincts" or bouts of rage. Gordon agreed that her songs' meanings often changed during and after the writing process. "You write a song, think it's about one thing for five minutes....and discover that it's about many different things and working on many different levels." In Veruca Salt's 1997 hit single "Volcano Girls," the seether was identified as "Louise," which presumably refers to Veruca Salt singer-guitarist Louise Post.

== Release ==
Veruca Salt recorded the song in early 1994, with production by Brad Wood. They then released "Seether"/"All Hail Me" as their debut single on the independent label Minty Fresh. "Seether" quickly became popular on college and alternative radio stations. Its success led the band to record and release their debut album American Thighs, which included "Seether", later that year. Shortly thereafter, the band signed with the major label Geffen Records, which re-released the album. "Seether" peaked at number eight on the US Billboard Modern Rock Tracks chart, became a hit on MTV, and launched the band into fame.

== Reception and legacy ==
In 1994, the song was ranked number three in British Radio One DJ John Peel's Festive Fifty. In a 2014 retrospective, music magazine Paste listed "Seether" at number 10 on their list of the 50 greatest grunge songs of all time. Pitchfork called it, "bubblegrunge at its finest, all guitar fuzz and pop stickiness and crackling angst animating a personification of anger that just can't be leashed. 'I try to cram her back in my mouth,' co-frontwoman Nina Gordon sings in the verse, but she didn't really try that hard."

== Music video ==
The video features band members Nina Gordon, Louise Post, Jim Shapiro, and Steve Lack playing the song in front of the iconic shimmering red Randolph Street Gallery building when it was located at 756 North Milwaukee Avenue in Chicago. The indoor shots of the band with cats roaming about were taken at Tree House Humane Society at their former location, 1212 West Carmen Street, Chicago.

== Charts ==
Weekly chart performance for "Seether"
Chart (1994)	Peak position
Australia (ARIA)	34
UK Singles (OCC)	61
US Modern Rock Tracks (Billboard)	8

== Seether version ==
South African rock band Seether named themselves after this song, and in 2012, recorded a cover of the song for their greatest hits album Seether: 2002–2013. It was released as a single on September 3, 2013.
