= IV (Veruca Salt album) =

Studio album by Veruca Salt
- Released: September 12, 2006
- Genre: Alternative rock, indie rock
- Length: 55:17
- Label: Sympathy for the Record Industry
- Producer: Rae DeLio, Louise Post

Veruca Salt chronology
Lords of Sounds and Lesser Things [EP] (2005)	IV (2006)	MMXIV [EP] (2014)

Professional ratings
Review scores
Source	Rating
AllMusic	4/5 stars
IGN	6.6/10
The Phoenix	3/4 stars
Spin	(favourable)

IV is the fourth full-length studio album by alternative rock band Veruca Salt. It was released on September 12, 2006, in the United States and on September 25, 2006, in Australia. This is the last album to feature Stephen Fitzpatrick on guitars and the only album to feature Kellii Scott on drums and Nicole Fiorentino on bass.

== Track listing ==
No.	Title	Writer(s)	Length
1.	"So Weird"	Fitzpatrick, Post	3:35
2.	"Centipede"	Fitzpatrick, Post	3:00
3.	"Innocent"	Fitzpatrick, Post	2:52
4.	"Circular Trend"	Post	2:42
5.	"Perfect Love"	Post	3:42
6.	"Closer"	Fitzpatrick, Post, Stack	3:27
7.	"Sick as Your Secrets"	Fitzpatrick, Post	5:36
8.	"Wake Up Dead"	Post	3:34
9.	"Damage Done"	Post	4:09
10.	"Blissful Queen"	Post	3:44
11.	"The Sun"	Fitzpatrick, Post	3:57
12.	"Comes and Goes"	Post	2:29
13.	"Save You"	Fitzpatrick, Post	4:24
14.	"Salt Flat Epic"	Fitzpatrick, Post	7:57
Total length:			55:17

Japanese bonus tracks
No.	Title	Writer(s)	Length
1.	"Blood on My Hands"	Fitzpatrick, Post	3:30
2.	"For Days"	Post	4:08

- "Blood on My Hands" and "For Days", as well as alternate recordings of "The Sun" and "Save You", were originally released on the 2005 EP, Lords of Sounds and Lesser Things.

== Personnel ==
Veruca Salt

- Louise Post – vocals, guitars, percussion, production
- Stephen Fitzpatrick – guitars, mellotron
- Kellii Scott – drums, percussion
- Nicole Fiorentino – bass guitar

Additional musicians

- Matt Walker – percussion, drums
- Solomon Snyder – bass guitar
- Paul Wiancko – cello
- Jonny Polonsky – piano
- Rae DeLio – production, engineering, mixing
- David Cheppa – mastering
- Tony Shanks – design and art direction
- Tate Wittenberg – photography
- Claire Coleman – make-up
