= Nina Gordon =

American singer and guitarist

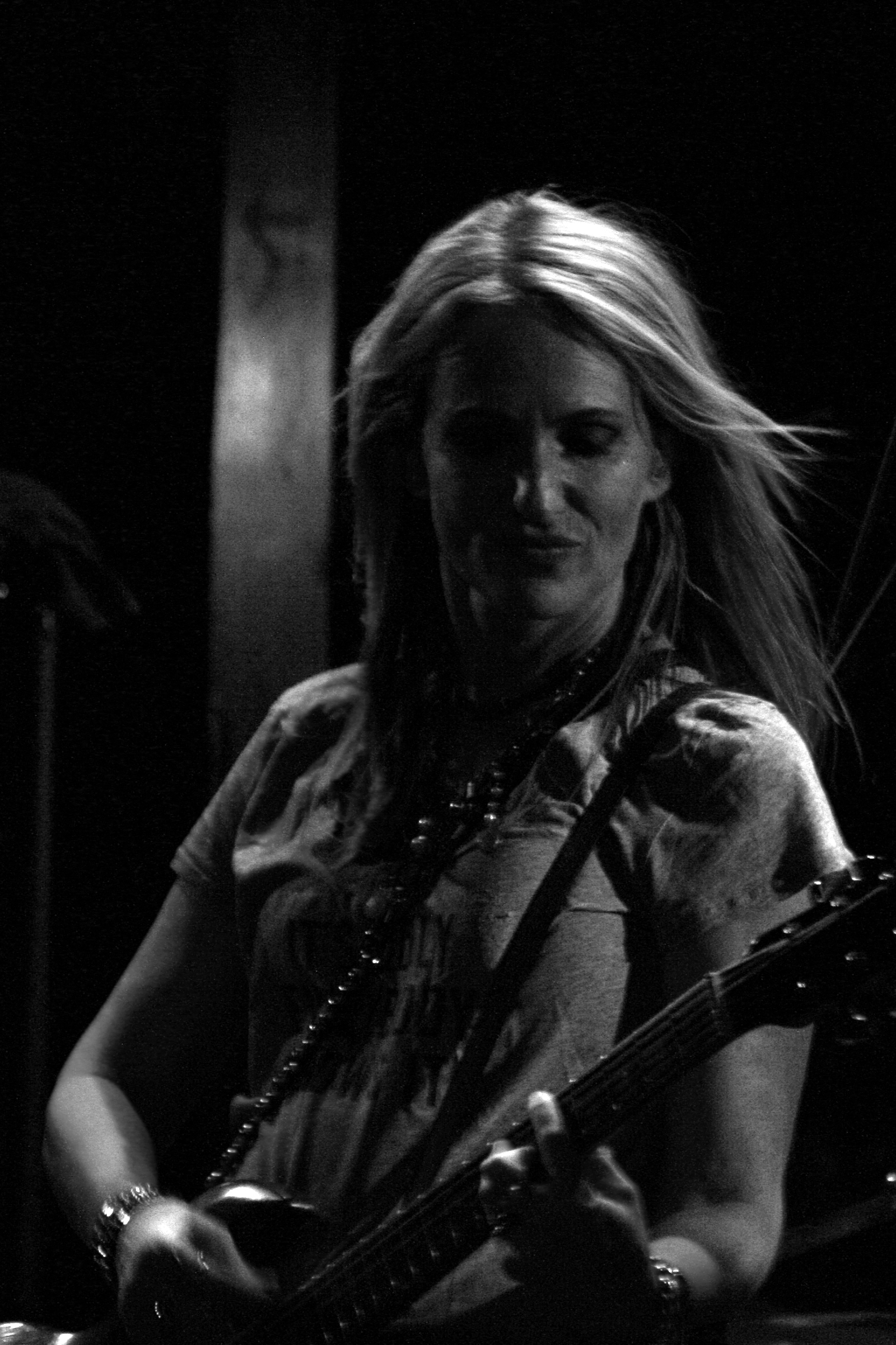
- Gordon in 2014

Background information
- Born: Nina Rachel Gordon Shapiro; November 14, 1967 (age 58); Washington, D.C., U.S.
- Origin: Chicago, Illinois, U.S.
- Genres: Alternative rock; power pop; grunge
- Occupations: Musician; singer; songwriter
- Instruments: Vocals; guitar
- Years active: 1992–present
- Label: Warner Bros.
- Member of: Veruca Salt

Nina Rachel Gordon Shapiro (born November 14, 1967), known as Nina Gordon, is an American singer, songwriter, and guitarist. She co-founded the alternative rock band Veruca Salt and played on their first two studio albums, American Thighs (1994) and Eight Arms to Hold You (1997). During that time, Gordon wrote the band's hit singles "Seether" and "Volcano Girls". After leaving Veruca Salt, she released two solo albums, Tonight and the Rest of My Life (2000) and Bleeding Heart Graffiti (2006). She then rejoined Veruca Salt for their album Ghost Notes (2015).

== Early life ==
Nina Rachel Gordon Shapiro was born November 14, 1967, in Washington, D.C. to Robert B. Shapiro and Berta Gordon. Her father was a law student at the time of her birth. She was raised along with her brother, Jim Shapiro, in several different locations, moving between Washington, D.C., and Madison, Wisconsin, before settling in Chicago when Gordon was a teenager. Gordon has commented that her parents had a turbulent relationship and eventually divorced in her childhood. Gordon attended high school at the Latin School of Chicago. While attending college, Gordon intended to major in music, but ultimately graduated with a Bachelor of Arts degree in art history from Tufts University. She is Jewish.

== Career ==
=== 1992–1996: Veruca Salt formation and American Thighs ===
Veruca Salt was formed in Chicago in 1992 by Gordon and Louise Post. Introduced by Gordon's good friend, actress Lili Taylor, Gordon and Post quickly became friends and began playing music together. In 1993, they enlisted bassist Steve Lack and Gordon's brother Jim Shapiro, a guitarist who joined as the band's drummer as a favor to his sister. Gordon and Post both sang and played guitar on Veruca Salt's material during the 1990s. The two were also the band's primary songwriters, each writing their songs separately.

Veruca Salt released a self-funded demo tape and shopped it to labels while playing a handful of small club shows. The buzz around the band grew, and after only a few live gigs, the band was signed to Minty Fresh Records and began recording with producer Brad Wood, who had recently worked on Liz Phair's critically acclaimed Exile in Guyville.

The band released an orange 7" single for the song "Seether," which Gordon wrote. The song was a distorted alt-rocker about an angry and misunderstood woman. Compared to the rest of Veruca Salt's material, "Seether" sounded very pop. They sent "Seether" to radio, as it was the most radio-friendly song they had written, and the reaction was positive. It quickly became a hit on college and alternative stations. The album was not complete, and the band rushed to finish it before "Seether" lost its radio momentum. The song ended up peaking at #8 on the Modern Rock charts and became a hit on MTV.

Veruca Salt's debut studio album American Thighs was released through Minty Fresh on September 27, 1994, and re-released on November 8, 1994, by the major label Geffen Records after the label signed the band following an intense bidding war. The album peaked at No. 69 on the Billboard Top 200 and was eventually certified gold. The second single, "Number One Blind," written by Gordon and Shapiro, peaked at No. 20 on the Modern Rock charts, but did not do as well as "Seether". Gordon and Post were unhappy with the song's video, and it was pulled after airing fewer than five times on MTV's 120 Minutes.

To support the album, Veruca Salt toured, opening for acts such as Hole, Live and PJ Harvey. They also headlined a club tour, after which they entered the studio with Bob Rock to record their second album. The band was inspired to work with Rock after hearing Metallica's "Enter Sandman" over the house PA system before a Veruca Salt concert at an outdoor music festival. The band released an EP in 1996 titled Blow It Out Your Ass It's Veruca Salt to tide fans over until their next album. It was produced by Steve Albini and contains the Gordon-penned "Shimmer Like a Girl" and "New York Mining Disaster 1996".

During this time, Gordon also collaborated with other musicians on side projects. With Scott Miller, she co-wrote the song "The Softest Tip of Her Baby Tongue," which appeared on The Loud Family's 1996 album Interbabe Concern. She worked with James Iha on the Smashing Pumpkins song "...Said Sadly" (the b-side to their 1995 single "Bullet with Butterfly Wings"), and also recorded duets with Fig Dish and Triple Fast Action.

=== 1997–1998: Eight Arms to Hold You and departure from Veruca Salt ===
Veruca Salt's second album Eight Arms to Hold You, which was released February 11, 1997, on Geffen Records, proved to be a difficult and dividing album. Some fans of American Thighs were disappointed by the polished, hard-rock and distinctively Bob Rock production, in comparison to the laid back, indie buzz-bin vibe of American Thighs. The new album garnered mixed reviews from music critics, as well. Band members later admitted that the recording process for this album was more tense than the previous one, and the creative differences between Gordon and Post increased.

However, Eight Arms to Hold You sold well due to the success of the first single, "Volcano Girls," written by Gordon. It was a catchy, power-pop tantrum that matched the success of "Seether," peaking at No. 8 on the Modern Rock charts. The album peaked higher (Billboard Top 200 at 55) than American Thighs, but sales dropped off when the second single "Shutterbug" failed to chart, despite a high-budget video and Saturday Night Live performance. Three more singles were sent to radio ("The Morning Sad," "Straight," and "Benjamin") but none of them did well enough to warrant a video. The Gordon-penned "Benjamin" was released internationally as the third and last commercial single from the album despite having no video and no promotion.

After recording the album, Shapiro left the band and was replaced on drums by Stacy Jones. Veruca Salt toured extensively for Eight Arms to Hold You, opening for Bush as well as doing a lengthy international headlining club tour.

Gordon and Post then started work on Veruca Salt's third album. However, the tension between the two soon came to a head, and after an argument with Post, Gordon left the band in early 1998. Jones left the band at the same time, and Gordon and Jones dated for the next few years. In 1998, Gordon sang on James Iha's solo album Let It Come Down on the song "Beauty."

=== 1999–2001: Start of solo career and Tonight and the Rest of My Life ===
Professional ratings
Review scores
| Source | Rating |
|---|---|
| AllMusic | 4/5 stars |

Soon after leaving Veruca Salt, Gordon demoed solo material in Boston with friends Kay Hanley and Michael Eisenstein from the band Letters to Cleo. Shortly after, she began recording with Eight Arms producer Bob Rock. The album, titled Tonight and the Rest of My Life, was finished in early 1999 and was set to be released by the Outpost Records label, owned by Geffen Records, in August 1999. However, the merger of Geffen Records with Interscope Records forced Outpost Records to fold, leaving Gordon without a label.

A few months later, Gordon was signed by Warner Bros. Records. Tonight was finally released on June 27, 2000. The first single, also titled "Tonight and the Rest of My Life," did well on radio and was later included in commercials for hit films such as Chocolat and The Notebook in addition to an appearance on an episode of Charmed. The second single "Now I Can Die" did not perform as well, but the third single, a radio-only single titled "2003," performed better despite having little promotion and no video. Gordon toured with David Gray as an opening act, and did a headlining tour with Paloalto.

Tonight and the Rest of My Life peaked at a disappointing 123 on the Billboard Top 200. However, it floated around the mid-100s for months, and sold close to 300,000 copies in the U.S. and 50,000 in Japan.

=== 2002–2011: Bleeding Heart Graffiti and career hiatus ===
In the early 2000s, Gordon and Post reconciled via email, but the two did not work together professionally for years afterward. Post recruited new musicians for Veruca Salt, and the band released studio albums in 2000 and 2006 without Gordon.

After Gordon finished promoting Tonight and the Rest of My Life in late 2001, she took a break and began writing material for her second solo album. However, she did not get into the studio again until late 2003, and Gordon said it was because she wanted to write a lot of great material. To tide fans over, Gordon released b-side material from Tonight on her website and a demo for a song called "The Time Comes," which was featured in the independent film Stealing Innocence. Around that time, she moved to California.

Gordon began recording her second album with Ethan Johns in late 2003, and via her website stated she was excited with the direction the album was going, even though it was very mellow and sad. Gordon finished recording with Johns in early 2004 and stated that she had named it Even the Sunbeams. A few months later, Gordon admitted she was unhappy with the album and she was not going to release it. The only song that surfaced from this recording session was "Lighter on the Moon," which was available on Gordon's MySpace page. In April 2006, Gordon said in the Chicago Reader, "It's a really sad and really slow record. I guess that's how I was feeling at the time, but when I sorta snapped out of that, I thought, 'I don't know that I want this to be the album I put out next.' It's really a lovely record, but it didn't have the spirit of the records I've made in the past." Some songs were re-recorded and included on her next album. The remaining songs were eventually made available free on her website as an EP titled Songs from Even the Sunbeams.

During this time, Gordon was performing at Largo in Los Angeles, for "Bring the Rock" nights, covering songs by N.W.A, Skid Row, Backstreet Boys, Phil Collins, and others. Her cover of N.W.A's "Straight Outta Compton" gained her popularity on Internet music blogs. She also wrote a song with Fefe Dobson titled "Get You Off" for Dobson's album Sunday Love (on which Gordon also sang back-up), as well as a song for Courtney Jaye's album Traveling Light titled "This Is the Day," which she wrote with her boyfriend Jeff Russo.

Still seeing promise in the material from Even the Sunbeams, Gordon booked producer and long-time friend Bob Rock to record an album in 2005. In a few months, Gordon re-did most of the songs and recorded new songs, as well. The album, now titled Bleeding Heart Graffiti, was released August 8, 2006. The first song to see the light of day from the project was the b-side "The Blue Hour," a half-French, half-English rock song that could be heard on Gordon's website.

The lead single from Bleeding Heart Graffiti, "Kiss Me 'Til It Bleeds" was released in mid-July. There was a physical promotional single for "Kiss Me 'Til It Bleeds" and it contained the Bleeding Heart Graffiti album track "Don't Let Me Down," as well as Gordon's previous hit single, "Tonight and the Rest of My Life". Almost all radio stations received digital copies of the single rather than physical CD singles, however. After Bleeding Heart Graffiti, Gordon did not release any new music during the rest of the decade.

In the late 2000s, Gordon had two children with her boyfriend, musician Jeff Russo. Gordon and Russo later married.

=== 2012–present: Rejoining Veruca Salt and Ghost Notes ===
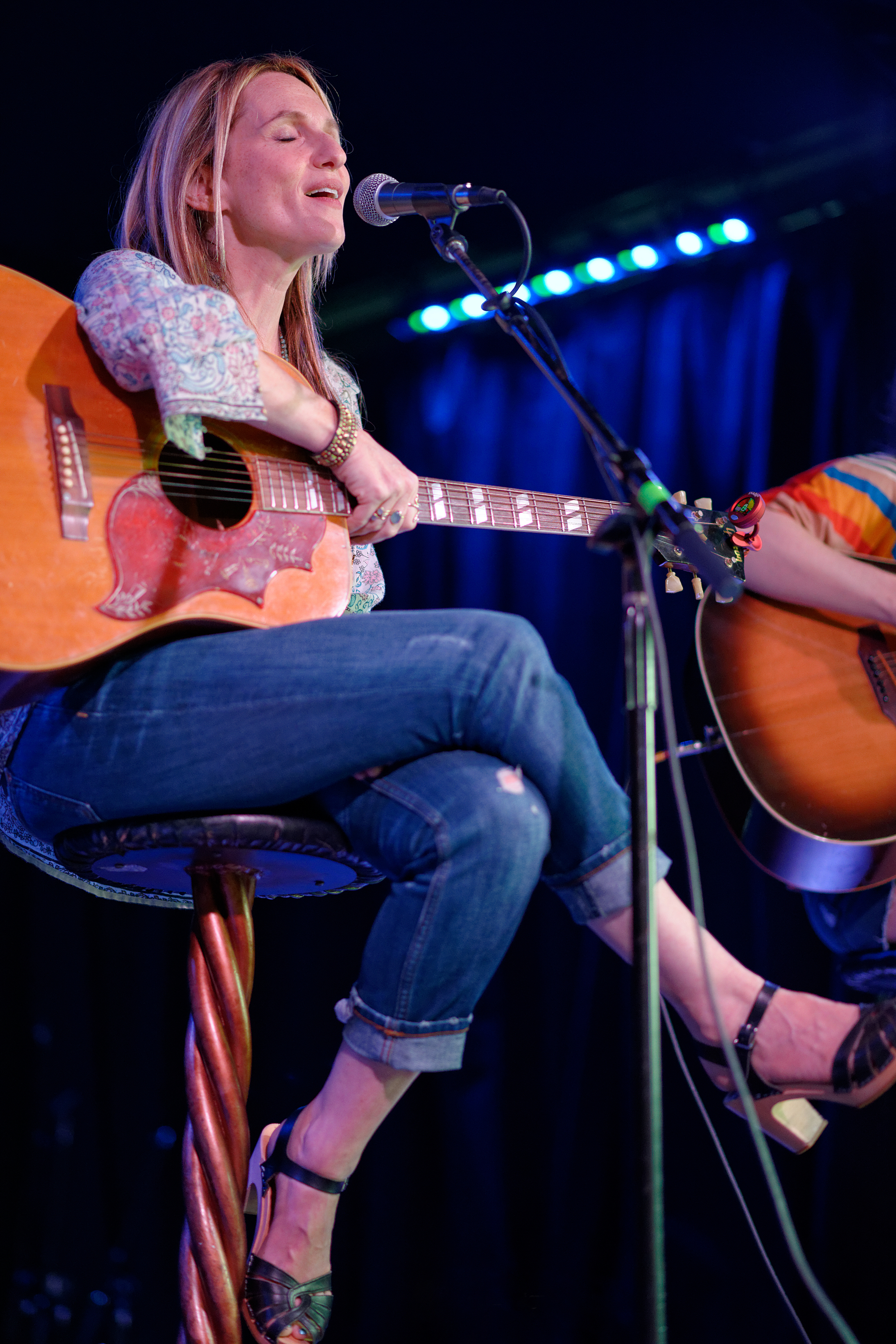
Gordon performing in 2015

In 2012, with Veruca Salt on hiatus, the original members – Gordon, Post, Lack, and Shapiro – met with each other for the first time since the 1990s. In 2013, the band announced that their original lineup had officially gotten back together. The band announced tour dates in April 2014 and released a 10" single on Record Store Day. That year, they played several concerts in the United States and Australia.

The fifth Veruca Salt album, Ghost Notes, contained songs about the original members' breakup and eventual reunion. It was released on July 10, 2015, to favorable reviews.

== Personal life ==
Gordon and husband Jeff Russo have two children.

== Discography ==
=== Veruca Salt ===
| Year | Album |
|---|---|
| 1994 | American Thighs |
| 1996 | Blow It Out Your Ass It's Veruca Salt |
| 1997 | Eight Arms to Hold You |
| 2014 | MMXIV |
| 2015 | Ghost Notes |

| Year | Single |
|---|---|
| 1994 | "Seether" |
| 1995 | "Number One Blind" |
| 1997 | "Volcano Girls" |
| 1997 | "Benjamin" |
| 1997 | "The Morning Sad" (promo only) |
| 2015 | "Laughing in the Sugar Bowl" |

=== Solo ===
| Year | Album |
|---|---|
| 2000 | Tonight and the Rest of My Life |
| 2006 | Bleeding Heart Graffiti |

| Year | Single |
|---|---|
| 2000 | "Tonight and the Rest of My Life" |
| 2001 | "Now I Can Die" |
| 2001 | "2003" (promo only) |
| 2006 | "Kiss Me 'Til It Bleeds" |

=== With other artists ===
| Year | Tracks |
|---|---|
| 1995 | "... Said Sadly" (with The Smashing Pumpkins) |
| 1998 | "Beauty" (with James Iha) |
