= Eight Arms to Hold You =

Studio album by Veruca Salt
- Released: February 11, 1997
- Recorded: June 1996
- Studios: Wicked Wahine, Maui, Hawaii
- Genres: Hard rock; heavy metal
- Length: 51:10
- Labels: Outpost; Geffen
- Producer: Bob Rock

Veruca Salt chronology
Blow It Out Your Ass It's Veruca Salt (1996)	Eight Arms to Hold You (1997)	Resolver (2000)

Professional ratings
Review scores
Source	Rating
AllMusic	3/5 stars
Christgau's Consumer Guide	(1-star Honorable Mention)
The Encyclopedia of Popular Music	4/5 stars
Entertainment Weekly	B+
MusicHound Rock	3.5/5 stars
NME	7/10
Rolling Stone	1.5/5 stars
The Rolling Stone Album Guide	3.5/5 stars
Spin	7/10
Wall of Sound	36/100

Eight Arms to Hold You is the second studio album by alternative rock band Veruca Salt. It was released on February 11, 1997, through Outpost/Geffen Records.

== Release ==
The album was produced by Bob Rock. The title is a reference to the working title for the Beatles' film eventually titled Help!

The album was recorded at Wicked Wahine, in Haʻikū, Hawaii. Bob Rock commented: "We ended up throwing my equipment into a house here. And they had such a great time and loved it so much that I just converted a part of my house." Additional recording took place at Chicago Recording Company in Chicago and The Warehouse Studio in Vancouver.

Eight Arms to Hold You peaked at number 55 on the Billboard 200. The single "Volcano Girls", written by Nina Gordon, was a rock radio hit. Veruca Salt performed "Shutterbug", written by Louise Post, on Saturday Night Live. Besides those two, there were three other singles released from the album: "Benjamin", "The Morning Sad", and "Straight".

This was the last album to feature all of the original band members—Gordon, Post, Steve Lack, and Jim Shapiro—until the 2015 album Ghost Notes.

== Track listing ==
All music is composed by Veruca Salt.

No.	Title	Writer(s)	Length
1.	"Straight"	Louise Post	2:32
2.	"Volcano Girls"	Nina Gordon	3:18
3.	"Don't Make Me Prove It"	Post	2:29
4.	"Awesome"	Gordon	3:32
5.	"One Last Time"	Post	4:45
6.	"With David Bowie"	Gordon	2:25
7.	"Benjamin"	Gordon	4:05
8.	"Shutterbug"	Post	4:16
9.	"The Morning Sad"	Gordon	3:08
10.	"Sound of the Bell"	Post	3:59
11.	"Loneliness Is Worse"	Gordon	5:00
12.	"Stoneface"	Gordon	2:44
13.	"Venus Man Trap"	Post	3:29
14.	"Earthcrosser"	Gordon	5:28
Total length:			51:10

== Personnel ==
Veruca Salt

- Nina Gordon – guitar, vocals
- Louise Post – guitar, vocals
- Jim Shapiro – guitar, drums, backing vocals
- Steve Lack – bass guitar, guitar

Additional personnel

- Jim McGillveray – percussion
- Zach Ingraham – whiteboard
- Bob Rock – producer
- Randy Staub – engineer, mixing
- Brian Dobbs – engineer
- Mike Cusick – assistant engineer
- Jim Labinski – assistant engineer
- Jeff Lane – assistant engineer, mixing assistant
- Darren Grahn – assistant engineer
- George Marino – mastering
- Mike Gilles – digital editing, assistant engineer, digital programming

== Charts ==
=== Album ===
Chart performance for Eight Arms to Hold You
Chart (1997)	Peak position
Australian Albums (ARIA)	69
New Zealand Albums (RMNZ)	34
Swedish Albums (Sverigetopplistan)	40
UK Albums (Official Charts)	95
US Billboard 200	55
Canada Top Albums/CDs (RPM)	40

=== Singles ===
- 1997 – "Volcano Girls" – US Modern Rock Tracks - No. 8
- 1997 – "Volcano Girls" – US Mainstream Rock Tracks - No. 9
- 1997 – "Volcano Girls" – UK Singles Chart - No. 56
- 1997 – "Volcano Girls" – Australian ARIA singles chart - No. 47
- 1997 – "Volcano Girls" – Swedish singles chart - No. 32
- 1997 – "Shutterbug" – US Mainstream Rock Tracks - No. 39
- 1997 – "Shutterbug" – Australian ARIA singles chart - No. 114
- 1997 – "Benjamin" – UK Singles Chart - No. 75
- 1997 – "Straight" – US Mainstream Rock Tracks - No. 38
