= American Thighs =

Studio album by Veruca Salt
- Released: September 27, 1994
- Studios: Idful, Chicago, Illinois
- Genres: Alternative rock; grunge; hard rock
- Length: 52:24
- Label: Minty Fresh
- Producer: Brad Wood

Veruca Salt chronology
American Thighs (1994)	Blow It Out Your Ass It's Veruca Salt (1996)

Singles from American Thighs
- 1. "Seether" / "All Hail Me" Released: October 11, 1994; 2. "Number One Blind" Released: June 23, 1995; 3. "Victrola" Released: July 25, 1995

American Thighs is the debut studio album by American alternative rock band Veruca Salt, released on September 27, 1994. The album features the single "Seether".

== Background and release ==
Singer-guitarists Nina Gordon and Louise Post started working together in 1992. They eventually formed Veruca Salt with bassist Steve Lack and drummer Jim Shapiro, and the four had been a full band less than a year when they signed with the independent label Minty Fresh. In 1994, they released the single "Seether"/"All Hail Me". "Seether" became a hit on college and alternative radio stations, and the band recorded the album American Thighs with producer Brad Wood. The album was released through Minty Fresh on September 27, 1994, the title is a reference to a line from the AC/DC song "You Shook Me All Night Long".

Veruca Salt then signed with the major label Geffen Records, which re-released the album. "Seether" became a hit on MTV. Two more singles, "Number One Blind" and "Victrola", were released from the album, but neither matched the success of "Seether". American Thighs was eventually certified gold.

== Critical reception ==
Professional ratings
Review scores
Source	Rating
AllMusic	4/5 stars
The Encyclopedia of Popular Music	2/5 stars
MusicHound Rock	4/5 stars
NME	7/10
Rolling Stone	3/5 stars
The Rolling Stone Album Guide	4/5 stars
The Village Voice	A−

American Thighs received generally positive reviews from critics. Nick Kelly of Hot Press said, "Given that this is their first record, you can't help asking yourself how a band so young can sing songs so good." Eric Gladstone of CMJ New Music Monthly wrote that "the album works an infectious formula: thick harmonies layered over attack-formation guitars and drums, with lyrics shifting from childlike innocence to guiltless brutality." Spin ranked it number 8 on its list of the 20 best albums of 1994.

Stephen Thomas Erlewine of AllMusic called American Thighs "a pure pop album masquerading as the next big thing." In 2014, Rolling Stone ranked it number 21 on its list of the 40 best alternative rock albums of 1994.

== Track listing ==
No.	Title	Writer(s)	Length
1.	"Get Back"	Nina Gordon	3:12
2.	"All Hail Me"	Louise Post	3:05
3.	"Seether"	Gordon	3:16
4.	"Spiderman '79"	Post	5:16
5.	"Forsythia"	Gordon	4:45
6.	"Wolf"	Post	4:19
7.	"Celebrate You"	Post	4:20
8.	"Fly"	Post	3:38
9.	"Number One Blind"	Gordon; Jim Shapiro	3:43
10.	"Victrola"	Post	2:19
11.	"Twinstar"	Gordon	3:16
12.	"25"	Gordon	7:56
13.	"Sleeping Where I Want" (CD release only)	Gordon	3:19
Total length:			52:24

== Personnel ==
Credits adapted from liner notes.

Veruca Salt

- Nina Gordon – guitar, vocals
- Louise Post – guitar, vocals
- Steve Lack – bass guitar
- Jim Shapiro – drums, background vocals

Additional musicians

- Christian Lane – additional vocals (on "Victrola")

Production

- Brad Wood – production, recording, mixing
- Casey Rice – additional engineering
- John McEntire – additional engineering
- Roger Seibel – mastering

== Charts ==
Chart (1994–95)	Peak position
Australian Albums (ARIA)	26
Canada Top Albums/CDs (RPM)	44
Scottish Albums (Official Charts)	83
UK Albums (Official Charts)	47
UK Rock & Metal Albums (Official Charts)	2
US Billboard 200	69
US Heatseekers Albums (Billboard)	1
