= Loud Lucy =

American alternative rock band

Loud Lucy was an American alternative rock band, part of the Chicago indie-rock scene of the early-to-mid-1990s.

Described by the Chicago-Tribune as "scrappy, unpretentious pop rock, "Loud Lucy's single, Ticking, reached number 38 on Billboard's Mainstream Rock Songs chart.

The band dissolved a few years after their debut album Breathe. The lead singer, Christian Lane, has had success as an actor and musician in TV and film.
