= Wes Kidd =

American musician and record producer

Wes Kidd was a founding member of Political Justice?, Rights of the Accused and Triple Fast Action, the latter signing to Capitol Records and Deep Elm Records. He grew up in Glen Ellyn, Illinois, and attended Glenbard West High School. After Triple Fast Action disbanded in 1998, he went on to produce several albums including Jimmy Eat World and The Damnwells as well as tour with Local H as lead guitarist. He became a manager and worked with Cheap Trick, Suffrajett, Brazilian Girls (Grammy Nominated), Los Amigos Invisibles (Latin Grammy Winner), Balkan Beatbox, Evan Dando, Jim Breuer, Joey Ramone's Estate, the Damnwells, Old 97s, Rhett Miller, JD McPherson, Local H, The Yawpers, The Cactus Blossoms, All Them Witches and many others at Red Light Management.
