= Louise Post =

American singer and guitarist

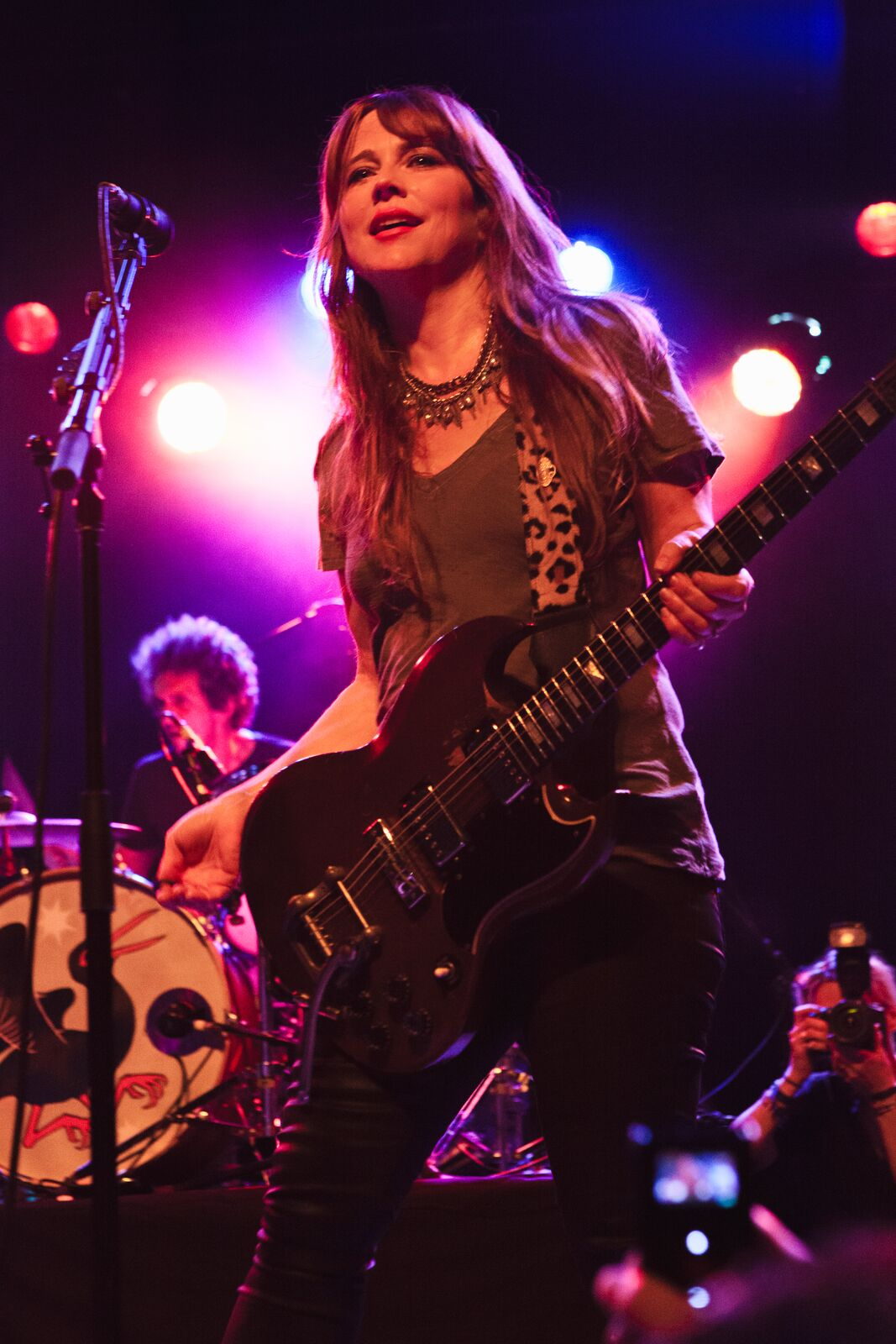
- Louise Post performing with Veruca Salt at the El Rey Theatre, Los Angeles, in 2017

Background information
- Born: Louise Lightner Post; December 7, 1966 (age 59); St. Louis, Missouri, U.S.
- Origin: Chicago, Illinois, U.S.
- Genre: Alternative rock
- Occupations: Singer, musician
- Instruments: Vocals, guitar
- Member of: Veruca Salt

Louise Lightner Post (born December 7, 1966) is an American musician. She is best known for being a vocalist and guitarist of the alternative rock band Veruca Salt, which she co-founded with Nina Gordon in 1992.

== Career ==
Shortly after they met, Post and Nina Gordon co-founded the alternative rock band Veruca Salt in Chicago in 1992 along with bassist Steve Lack and drummer Jim Shapiro, Gordon's brother. Post and Gordon were the band's vocalists, guitarists, and songwriters. Veruca Salt released a self-funded demo tape and shipped it to labels while playing a handful of small club shows. After a few live concerts, the band was signed to Minty Fresh Records and began recording with producer Brad Wood, at the time known for having produced Liz Phair's critically acclaimed album Exile in Guyville (1993).

The band released a 7-inch single for the song "Seether". Their first full-length album, American Thighs, was released on September 27, 1994, and re-released on November 8, 1994, by Geffen Records. The album peaked on the Billboard chart at number 69, and was eventually certified Gold. Other singles on the album included "All Hail Me" and "Number One Blind". To support the album, the band toured as the opening act for bands such as Hole, Live, and PJ Harvey. In 1996, Veruca Salt released an EP, Blow It Out Your Ass It's Veruca Salt, produced by Steve Albini.

The group entered the studio with producer Bob Rock in 1996. Their second album, Eight Arms to Hold You, was released on February 11, 1997, and included the hit "Volcano Girls", which was the opening theme for dark comedy film Jawbreaker. Another single, "Shutterbug", was performed by the band on Saturday Night Live.

In 1998, Gordon left the band, and Post recruited new members. They then released another album, Resolver (2000). The band's new line-up toured in summer 2001 and promoted the album in the United Kingdom. Resolver was released in Australia in 2003 and promoted with both a tour and the release of a tour EP, Officially Dead, in 2003.

In 2005, the band toured Australia and released another EP, Lords of Sounds and Lesser Things, followed by a full-length album, IV (2006). In 2007, the group covered Neil Young's song "Burned" for a breast cancer benefit album and then went dormant. In 2012, the band's hiatus was announced on their official website.

In 2013, Veruca Salt announced the reunion of its original line-up on their Facebook page; on September 29, 2013, it was announced that they were working on new material, set to be released in 2014. On April 19, 2014, for Record Store Day, the band released a 10-inch vinyl disc, MMXIV, containing two new songs, "It's Holy" and "The Museum of Broken Relationships". In 2014, the band played several dates in the United States and Australia. The first post-reunion Veruca Salt album, Ghost Notes, was released on July 10, 2015, to favorable reviews.

== Personal life ==
Post and bandmate Nina Gordon were very close friends for much of Veruca Salt's early years. By the late 1990s, the personal disagreements between the two increased, resulting in Gordon's departure from the band. Veruca Salt's 2000 album, Resolver, the first one released without Gordon, contains lyrics that have been interpreted as "hostile" toward her, but the two never publicly explained their falling out. In 2003, Post said the two had reconciled and were friends, but "not at the same intensity". In October 2006, Post complimented Gordon's solo career. In 2013, it was announced that Gordon had returned to Veruca Salt, with Post calling her "my best friend".

In the late 1990s, Post was in a relationship with Foo Fighters leader and former Nirvana drummer Dave Grohl. Grohl has said that the Foo Fighters song "Everlong" (on which Post sang backing vocals, recorded over a telephone line from Chicago to Los Angeles) is about Post.

Post began dating The Brontosaur's frontman, Tony Parks, in 2001. The couple married on March 30, 2008, in Las Vegas and have one child, born in 2010.

In October 2017, Post was one of 38 women who publicly accused film director James Toback of sexual harassment. That number later grew to nearly 400.

== Discography ==
=== With Veruca Salt ===
- American Thighs (1994)
- Blow It Out Your Ass It's Veruca Salt EP (1996)
- Eight Arms to Hold You (1997)
- Resolver (2000)
- Officially Dead EP (2003)
- Lords of Sounds and Lesser Things EP (2005)
- IV (2006)
- The track "Burned" on Cinnamon Girl: Women Artists Cover Neil Young for Charity (2008)
- MMXIV EP (2014)
- Ghost Notes (2015)

=== Studio albums ===
- Sleepwalker (2023)

=== EPs ===
- But I Love You Without Mascara (Demos '97-'98) (2022)

=== Singles ===
- "You Get High" (2024)

=== Appearances ===
- Loud Lucy – "Stop Draggin' My Heart Around" from You Got Lucky – A Tribute to Tom Petty (1994)
- Loud Lucy – Breathe on the song "Over Me"
- Touch (OST) the songs "Touch" and "Saints In Love" with Dave Grohl (1997)
- The Avengers (1998) (OST) "Solve My Problems" with Ashtar Command
- Frogpond – Safe Ride Home (1999)
- Firetrucs – Hovercraft LP (2002) "Breathe" and "Telephone"
- The Still Life (2006 film) (OST) Piano version of "Spiderman '79" (2006)
- Cinnamon Girl – Women Artists Cover Neil Young for Charity - "Sugar Mountain" (2008)
- Ashtar Command – American Sunshine, Vol. 1 (2011)
- Skating Polly – New Trick (2017) – EP Collaboration between Skating Polly, Louise Post and Nina Gordon
