= Veruca Salt =

American alternative rock band

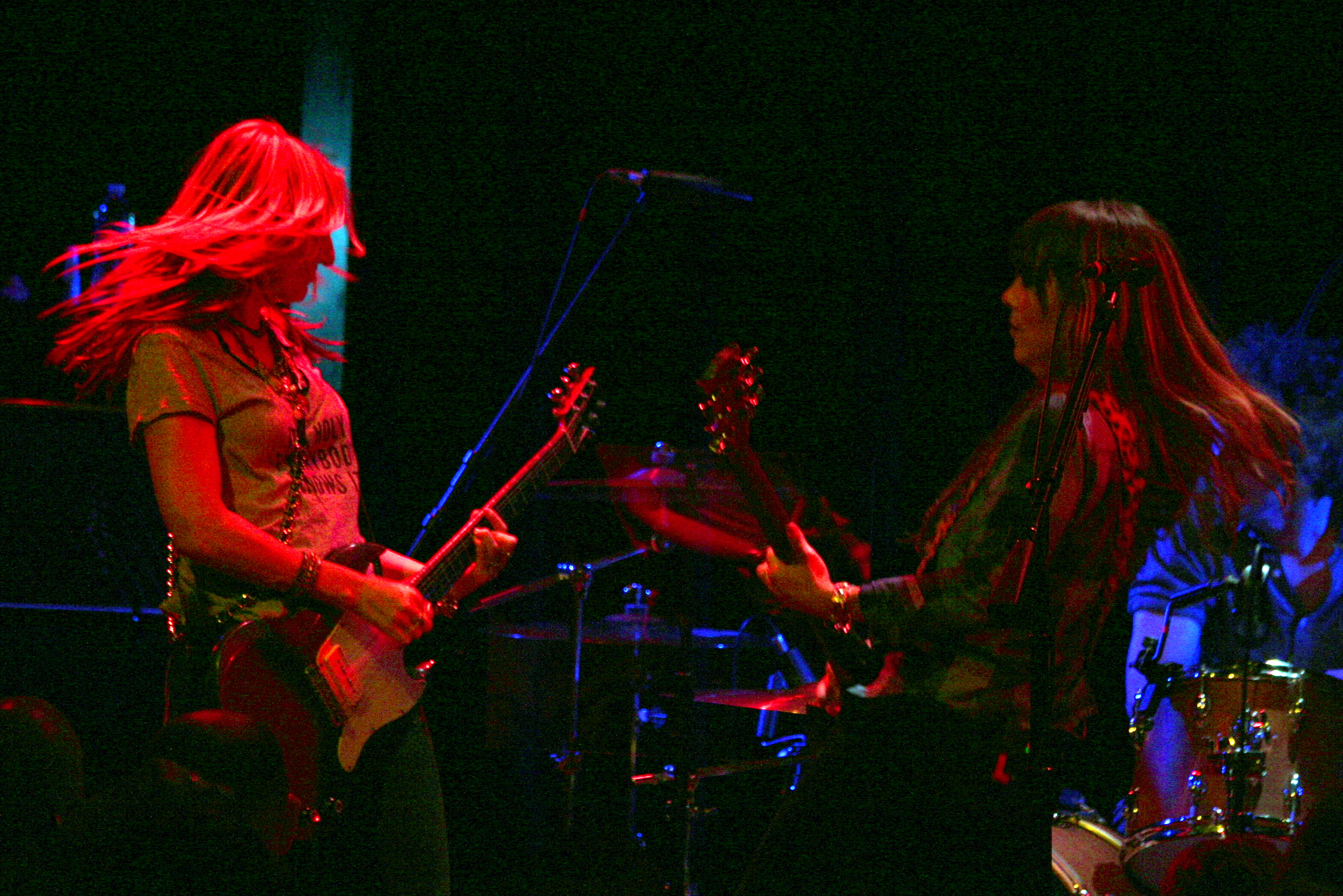
- Veruca Salt at Lincoln Hall, Chicago, in 2014

Background information
- Origin: Chicago, Illinois, U.S.
- Genres: Alternative rock; grunge; indie rock; power pop
- Years active: 1992–2012; 2013–present
- Labels: Minty Fresh; DGC; Outpost; Geffen; Beyond; MGM; Embryo; Sympathy for the Record Industry; El Camino; Sub Pop
- Members: Louise Post; Nina Gordon; Steve Lack; Jim Shapiro
- Past members: Stacy Jones; Stephen Fitzpatrick; Jimmy Madla; Suzanne Sokol; Gina Crosley; Kellii Scott; Nicole Fiorentino

Veruca Salt is an American alternative rock band founded in Chicago in 1992 by vocalist-guitarists Nina Gordon and Louise Post, drummer Jim Shapiro, and bassist Steve Lack. They are best known for their first single, "Seether", which was released on the 1994 album American Thighs. That success was followed up with 1997's Eight Arms to Hold You. By 1998, Post was the only original member still in the band and continued on with other musicians. Veruca Salt released the album Resolver in 2000 and the album IV in 2006. After a hiatus in 2012, the band reformed with its original lineup. Their fifth studio album, Ghost Notes, was released in 2015.

== History ==
=== 1992–1998: Formation and mainstream success ===
Named after Veruca Salt, the spoiled rotten rich girl from the 1964 children's book Charlie and the Chocolate Factory by Roald Dahl, Veruca Salt was formed in Chicago in 1992 by Louise Post (guitar and vocals) and Nina Gordon (guitar and vocals). Post and Gordon were introduced through mutual friend Lili Taylor, and began playing music together. They wrote songs for a year and a half before placing an ad in the Chicago Sun-Times for an all-female rhythm section. Instead the band was joined by Gordon's brother Jim Shapiro on drums and Steve Lack on bass. Songwriting was shared between Gordon and Post, though the two seldom collaborated. Rather, each would typically submit a complete song to the group and sing the lead vocals on that song, while the other would record backing vocals.

The band had performed a handful of shows when Jim Powers of Minty Fresh Records asked them to sign. The band's first release was the single "Seether"/"All Hail Me" on Minty Fresh Records, in 1994. The single was a success and Veruca Salt accompanied Hole on a tour, before releasing their first full-length album, American Thighs. The album which included "Seether" and "All Hail Me", eventually reached Gold status. In a 2014 retrospective, music magazine Paste listed "Seether" as number 10 and "All Hail Me" as number 39 on their list of the 50 greatest grunge songs of all time.

After signing to Geffen Records, the band quickly gained in popularity as "Seether" became an MTV hit. A second single, "Number One Blind" was released along with a music video directed by Steve Hanft. The band was unsure about the video and pulled it from MTV in a panic. As a result, Geffen ceased any further marketing for American Thighs.

A stop-gap EP which was recorded by Steve Albini, Blow It Out Your Ass It's Veruca Salt, was released in 1996. In 1996, Veruca Salt appeared as Pavement's replacement band in their video "Painted Soldiers".

Veruca Salt's second album, Eight Arms to Hold You, was produced by Bob Rock and released in 1997. Lead single "Volcano Girls" gained exposure as the opening theme to the teen comedy film Jawbreaker.

Veruca Salt performed another single, "Shutterbug", on Saturday Night Live; instead of the featured musical group performing two songs as had been a tradition, the musical performances were split between Sting and Veruca Salt. This change was announced at the last minute between the dress rehearsal and the live show, at the behest of Sting to producer Lorne Michaels.

Shapiro left the band soon after the release of Eight Arms, due to unease with having to learn how to play drums – an instrument he had only started playing when asked to join the band – while under public scrutiny. Shapiro was replaced by Stacy Jones (of Letters to Cleo and American Hi-Fi). Jones toured with the band on the Eight Arms tour and appeared in the music videos for "Volcano Girls" and "Shutterbug". In 1997, Veruca Salt opened for the band Bush in a North American tour.

=== 1998–2012: Gordon's departure and reformation ===
Gordon and Post started working together on Veruca Salt's third album. However, after an argument between the two, Gordon left the band to pursue a solo career in 1998. (Gordon's first album, Tonight and the Rest of My Life, was released in 2000 and featured drumming by Stacy Jones, who had also left Veruca Salt and was in a relationship with Gordon). The dispute between Gordon and Post has been described as "one of the greatest rock soap operas since Fleetwood Mac or Hüsker Dü."

Lack also left the band in 1998, leaving Post as the only remaining band member. Post contributed the song "Somebody" to the Depeche Mode tribute album For the Masses before recruiting a new lineup. Guitarist Stephen Fitzpatrick joined and went on to become one of Post's principal songwriting partners during the next decade. Jimmy Madla and Suzanne Sokol joined on drums and bass guitar, respectively. Most of the band's record label support had been fired during the Universal/PolyGram merger, so Post left Geffen Records, formed her own Velveteen Records label, and signed a distribution deal with Beyond Music. The reformed band released the album Resolver, which spawned both a single and video for "Born Entertainer" in May 2000.

Sokol left the band at the end of 2000 and was replaced by Post's friend Gina Crosley. The band continued to tour through the summer of 2001 in the UK. Post and Crosley also attempted to form a supergroup with Courtney Love of Hole and others but the project soon imploded. This allowed the pair to focus on new material for Veruca Salt which eventually yielded the Officially Dead EP that was primarily distributed during the band's 2003 tour of Australia. That tour was precipitated by the title track (which had been released on the Resolver LP three years prior) charting on the Triple J Top 100, peaking at number 13.

By 2005, Madla left to enter the restaurant business and Crosley was also dismissed. They were replaced in the studio by Solomon Snyder and Michael Miley, respectively. Veruca Salt began 2005 by touring Australia, undertaking both headline festival appearances and club shows. This session resulted in the Lords of Sounds and Lesser Things (LOSALT). The band went on tour with Post, Fitzpatrick, drummer Kellii Scott, and bassist Nicole Fiorentino. LOSALT was released independently by the band and included six new songs. The EP's title is an extract from Zora Neale Hurston's Their Eyes Were Watching God. This lineup then recorded a full-length album, IV, and released it in September 2006 (like Resolver before it, this album was released a month apart from a Nina Gordon solo album). The band then went on what would prove to be the last tour of Louise Post's solo incarnation of the band. A single, "So Weird", was released to radio at the end of October 2006, but despite being critically well-received, neither the song nor the album did well commercially.

In 2007, the band recorded a cover of Neil Young's song "Burned" for a 2007 breast cancer benefit album and then went almost entirely dormant. Post took time to have a child while Fiorentino went on to play bass with the Smashing Pumpkins and The Cold and Lovely. Kellii Scott returned to his original band, Failure. On March 14, 2012, the band announced on their official website that they were on an indefinite hiatus.

=== 2013–present: Original line-up reunion ===
On March 15, 2013, Veruca Salt announced the reunion of its original line-up (Nina Gordon, Louise Post, Jim Shapiro, and Steve Lack) with a message on the band's official Facebook page which read, "for now let's just say this: hatchets buried, axes exhumed." The band also mentioned that they might be open to adding material from their time apart into their sets at some point.

On September 29, 2013, the band announced via social media that they were working on new material. Their first release since reforming came in the form of a release for Record Store Day 2014. The band released a 10-inch vinyl EP, MMXIV, which contained two new songs, "It's Holy" and "The Museum of Broken Relationships", on one side and a 20th-anniversary re-release of "Seether" on the other. The band then toured both the United States and a nine-date sold-out tour of Australia.

On the May 21, 2014 episode of Conan, all four original members performed on stage together for the first time since 1996. The reunion marked the first time Shapiro played drums since leaving the band in 1997. It had also been years since Lack played bass, with his time out of the band spent on overcoming drug and alcohol abuse and pursuing surfing.

On May 19, 2015, the band announced the release of their fifth album, Ghost Notes. The album, released on July 10, 2015, was the first to feature the band's original lineup since 1997's Eight Arms to Hold You. Post and Gordon appeared on Ken Reid's TV Guidance Counselor Podcast on August 7, 2015, and revealed that Veruca Salt were approached to host a Fox comedy variety show in the 1990s.

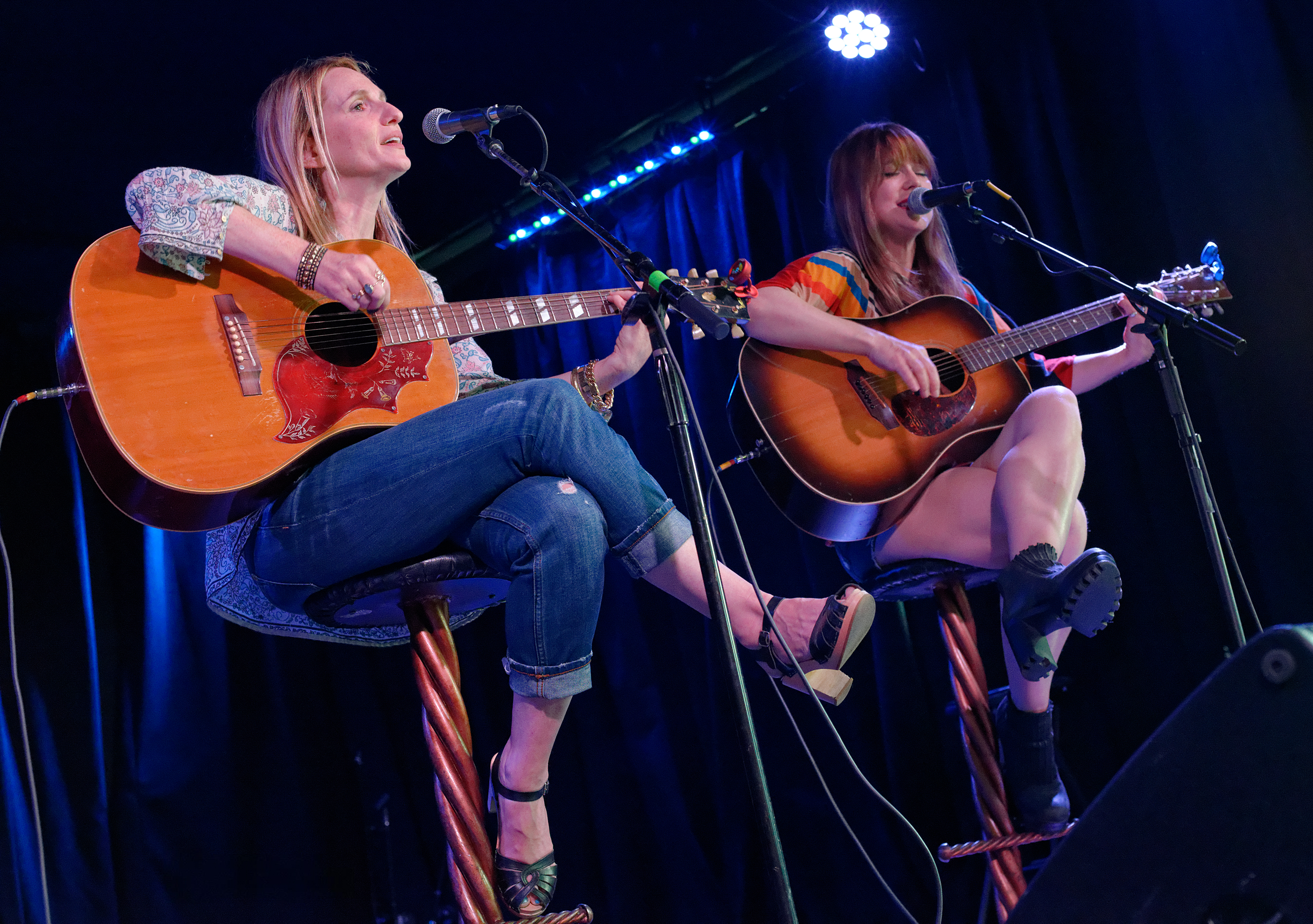
Nina Gordon & Louise Post in 2015.

In March 2017, the band reunited with Nicole Fiorentino for a one-off performance at a Planned Parenthood charity event; Patty Schemel, formerly of Hole, filled in on drums. The band returned to Australia in February 2018 for a series of headline shows, as well as being part of the mini-festival A Day on the Green alongside The Fauves, Tumbleweed, The Lemonheads, Spiderbait and The Living End. Veruca Salt teamed up with Rock the Vote for the 2018 American election, releasing a track titled "Low Grade Fever" from the Ghost Notes recording sessions.

In June 2022, Louise Post released But I Love You Without Mascara (Demos ’97–’98) which featured several unreleased demos from the transitional period between Eight Arms to Hold You and Resolver. She also released a solo album in June 2023 called Sleepwalker.

== Band members ==
Current members

- Louise Post – lead vocals, guitar (1992–2012, 2013–present), bass (1998–1999, 2001–2006, 2008–2012)
- Nina Gordon – lead vocals, guitar (1992–1998, 2013–present)
- Steve Lack – bass (1992–1998, 2013–present)
- Jim Shapiro – drums, backing vocals (1992–1997, 2013–present)

Former members

- Stacy Jones – drums (1997–1998)
- Stephen Fitzpatrick – guitar (1999–2012), bass (2002–2006, 2008–2012)
- Jimmy Madla – drums (1999–2005)
- Suzanne Sokol – bass, backing vocals (1999–2000)
- Gina Crosley – bass, backing vocals (2000–2001)
- Kellii Scott – drums (2005–2012)
- Nicole Fiorentino – bass, backing vocals (2006–2008; one-off in 2017)

Former touring musicians

- Bill Brabec – bass (1997–1998)
- Eva Gardner – bass (2005)
- Toby Lang – drums (2005)

== Discography ==
=== Studio albums ===
List of studio albums, with selected details, chart positions and certifications
Title	Album details	Peak chart positions								Certifications (sales threshold)
Title	Album details	US	US Alt	US Heat	US Indie	US Rock	AUS	UK	CAN	Certifications (sales threshold)
American Thighs	Released: September 27, 1994; Label: Minty Fresh; Formats: CD, LP, CS, DL	69	—	1	-	—	26	47	44	RIAA: Gold; MC: Gold
Eight Arms to Hold You	Released: February 11, 1997; Label: Outpost, Geffen; Formats: CD, LP, CS, DL	55	—	—	—	—	69	95	40	MC: Gold
Resolver	Released: May 16, 2000 (US), December 6, 2002 (Australia); Label: Beyond (US), MGM/Embryo (Australia); Formats: CD, LP, CS, DL	171	—	—	—	—	—	—	—	
IV	Released: September 12, 2006; Label: Sympathy for the Record Industry; Formats: CD, LP, DL	—	—	—	—	—	—	—	—	
Ghost Notes	Released: July 10, 2015; Label: El Camino (US), Warner Bros. (Australia); Formats: CD, LP, CS, DL	159	15	—	7	15	—	—	—	
"—" denotes a recording that did not chart or was not released in that territory.

=== Extended plays ===
EP Title	Year	Label	Peak chart positions
EP Title	Year	Label	AUS
Blow It Out Your Ass It's Veruca Salt	1996	DGC/Minty Fresh	194
Volcano Girls EP	1996	Geffen Records	—
Officially Dead	2003	Embryo Records	—
Lords of Sounds and Lesser Things	2005	Velveteen	—
MMXIV	2014	Minty Fresh	—

=== Singles ===
List of singles, with selected chart positions, showing year released and album name
Title	Year	Peak chart positions					Album
Title	Year	US Active Rock	US Main	US Mod	AUS	UK	Album
"Seether" / "All Hail Me"	1994	—	—	8	34	61	American Thighs
"Number One Blind"	1995	—	—	20	106	68	American Thighs
"Victrola"	1995	—	—	—	127	88	American Thighs
"Volcano Girls"	1997	8	9	8	47	56	Eight Arms to Hold You
"Shutterbug"	1997	26	39	—	114	—	Eight Arms to Hold You
"Benjamin"	1997	—	—	—	—	75	Eight Arms to Hold You
"Straight"	1997	28	38	—	—	—	Eight Arms to Hold You
"Born Entertainer"	2000	—	—	—	—	192	Resolver
"So Weird"	2006	—	—	—	—	—	IV
"The Museum of Broken Relationships" / "It's Holy"	2014	—	—	—	—	—	MMXIV
"Laughing in the Sugar Bowl"	2015	—	—	—	—	—	Ghost Notes
"—" denotes a recording that did not chart or was not released in that territory.

==== Promo singles ====
Year	Song	Album
1997	"The Morning Sad"	Eight Arms to Hold You
2000	"Only You Know"	Resolver
2003	"Officially Dead"	Resolver
2003	"Yeah Man"	Resolver

=== Music videos ===
Year	Song	Director
1994	"Seether"	Jeff Economy & Tim Rutili
1994	"All Hail Me"	Tamra Davis
1995	"Number One Blind"	Steve Hanft
1997	"Volcano Girls"	Paul Andresen & Nancy Bardawil
1997	"Shutterbug"	Nancy Bardawil
2000	"Born Entertainer"	Christopher Morrison
2014	"The Museum of Broken Relationships"	Gary Kordan
2014	"It's Holy"	Gary Kordan
2015	"Laughing in the Sugar Bowl"	Tim Rutili

== See also ==
- List of alternative rock artists
