= Resolver (Veruca Salt album) =

Studio album by Veruca Salt
- Released: May 16, 2000
- Recorded: 1999–2000
- Genre: Alternative rock, grunge
- Length: 47:56
- Label: Beyond
- Producer: Brian Liesegang

Veruca Salt chronology
Eight Arms to Hold You (1997)	Resolver (2000)	Officially Dead (2003)

Resolver is the third studio album by the American alternative rock band Veruca Salt. It was released on May 16, 2000, on Beyond Records, followed by an Australian release on December 6, 2002. The album was the first for the band after the departure of all the founding members except Louise Post, who became the band's sole frontwoman.

Like their previous album, Eight Arms to Hold You, the title is inspired by the Beatles; in this case, a play on the title of their 1966 album Revolver.

== Production ==
The album was produced by Brian Liesegang.

== Critical reception ==
Professional ratings
Review scores
Source	Rating
AllMusic	2.5/5 stars
Alternative Press	3/5 stars
The Encyclopedia of Popular Music	3/5 stars
Entertainment Weekly	C+
Kerrang!	4/5 stars
Q	3/5 stars
Rolling Stone	2/5 stars
The Rolling Stone Album Guide	3.5/5 stars
The Village Voice	A−
Wall of Sound	33/100

The Chicago Tribune wrote that Resolver is the album "in which Post and Veruca Salt blow past the years of snide hipster innuendo that somehow they just weren't good enough, a pop concoction cashing in on a trend (female-fronted alternative-rock bands) with a formulaic, bubblegum version of a once-revolutionary sound (the soft-loud dynamics, whispered verses and raging choruses of the Pixies, Nirvana and the Breeders)." The Washington Post thought that "what distinguishes Resolver is not a new style but a newfound consistency. Track for track, this is the band's catchiest album."

== Track listing ==
All songs written by Louise Post, except where noted.

U.S. release
No.	Title	Writer(s)	Length
1.	"The Same Person"		1:03
2.	"Born Entertainer"		2:40
3.	"Best You Can Get"	Post, Brian Liesegang	2:45
4.	"Wet Suit"		4:23
5.	"Yeah Man"		3:31
6.	"Imperfectly"	Post, Kevin Tihista	4:18
7.	"Officially Dead"	Post, Kevin Tihista	2:49
8.	"Only You Know"	Post, Brian Liesegang	4:09
9.	"Disconnected"		4:48
10.	"All Dressed Up"		5:54
11.	"Used to Know Her"		4:36
12.	"Pretty Boys"		3:07
13.	"Hellraiser"	Post, Kevin Tihista	3:53

European release (Artful Records)
No.	Title	Length
1.	"The Same Person"	1:03
2.	"Yeah Man"	3:29
3.	"Officially Dead"	2:49
4.	"Only You Know"	4:07
5.	"Disconnected"	4:46
6.	"Best You Can Get"	2:45
7.	"Used to Know Her"	4:34
8.	"All Dressed Up"	5:53
9.	"Born Entertainer"	2:40
10.	"Wet Suit"	4:23
11.	"Pretty Boys"	3:07
12.	"Imperfectly"	4:14
13.	"Hellraiser"	3:53

== Personnel ==
- Louise Post - bass guitar, guitar, keyboards, vocals, production, artwork, layout design
- Kevin Tihista - bass guitar, guitar, vocals
- Stephen Fitzpatrick - guitar
- Matt Walker - percussion, drums
- Eric Remschneider - cello
- Scott Pazera - additional guitars
- Brian Liesegang - programming, production, editing
- Travis King - engineering, production assistant, sound design, cover art, cover image
- Joe Barresi - mixing
- Howie Weinberg - mastering
- Randy Nicklaus - A&R
- Scott Steiner - programming, editing
- Chad Adams - engineering, editing
- Joe Wohlmuth - assistant
- Joshua Shapera - assistant

== Chart positions ==
=== Album ===
- 2000 Resolver Billboard 200 No. 171
