= List of songs recorded by the Smashing Pumpkins =

Songs recorded by the Smashing Pumpkins

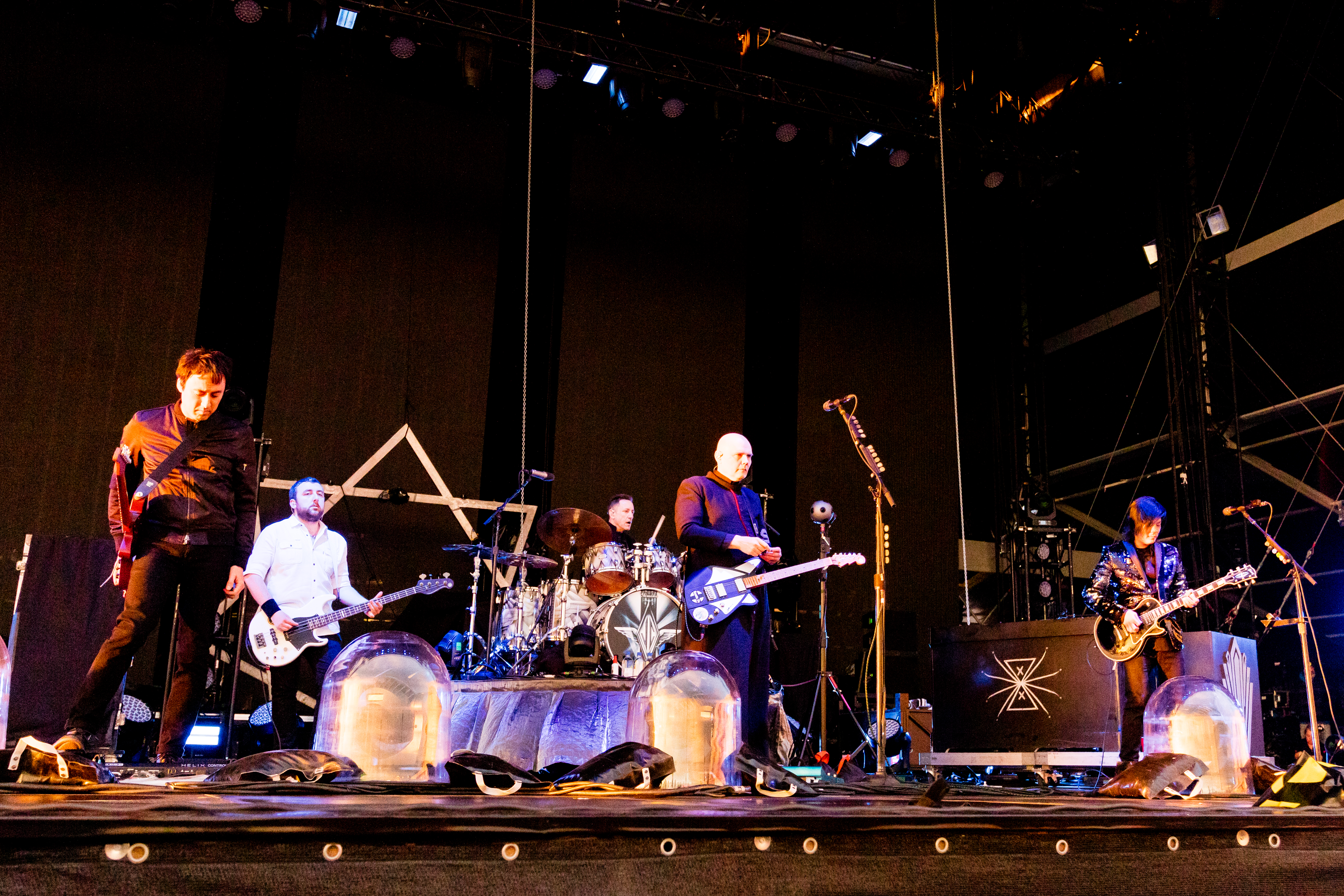
The Smashing Pumpkins performing in 2019

The Smashing Pumpkins are an American alternative rock band formed in 1988. The band has recorded many songs since their formation, with frontman Billy Corgan being the principle songwriter for most of their songs. The Smashing Pumpkins have also gone through many line-up changes, with Corgan being the most consistent member of the group. Below is a list of songs they have recorded as a band.

== Songs ==
Key
†	Indicates single release
#	Indicates cover version

Name of song, writer(s), original release, and year of release
Song	Writer(s)	Original release	Year	Ref(s)
"17"	Billy Corgan	Adore	1998	
"1979" †	Billy Corgan	Mellon Collie and the Infinite Sadness	1995	
"7 Shades of Black"	Billy Corgan	Zeitgeist	2007	
"999"	Billy Corgan	Aghori Mhori Mei	2024	
"Adrennalynne"	Billy Corgan	Cyr	2020	
"Aeroplane Flies High (Turn Left, Looks Right)"	Billy Corgan	The Aeroplane Flies High (B-side to "Thirty-Three")	1996	
"Again, Again, Again (The Crux)"	Billy Corgan	American Gothic (EP)	2008	
"Age of Innocence"	Billy Corgan	Machina/The Machines of God	2000	
"Alienation"	Billy Corgan	Shiny and Oh So Bright, Vol. 1 / LP: No Past. No Future. No Sun.	2018	
"Anaise!"	Billy Corgan	Monuments to an Elegy	2014	
"Annie-Dog"	Billy Corgan	Adore	1998	
"Anno Satana" †	Billy Corgan	Cyr	2020	
"Anti-Hero"	Billy Corgan	Monuments to an Elegy	2014	
"Appels + Oranjes"	Billy Corgan	Adore	1998	
"Astral Planes"	Billy Corgan	Teargarden by Kaleidyscope; Vol. 1: Songs for a Sailor	2010	
"Atom Bomb"	Billy Corgan	Machina II/The Friends & Enemies of Modern Music	2000	
"Atum"	Billy Corgan	Atum: A Rock Opera in Three Acts (Act One)	2022	
"Autumn"	Billy Corgan	Machina: Aranea Alba Editio	2025	
"Ava Adore" †	Billy Corgan	Adore	1998	
"Avalanche"	Billy Corgan	Atum: A Rock Opera in Three Acts (Act Two)	2023	
"Beautiful"	Billy Corgan	Mellon Collie and the Infinite Sadness	1995	
"Beguiled" †	Billy Corgan	Atum: A Rock Opera in Three Acts (Act Two)	2023	
"Behold! The Night Mare"	Billy Corgan	Adore	1998	
"Being Beige" †	Billy Corgan	Monuments to an Elegy	2014	
"Believe"	James Iha	The Aeroplane Flies High (B-side to "1979")	1996	
"The Bells"	James Iha	The Aeroplane Flies High (B-side to "Thirty-Three")	1996	
"Beyond the Vale"	Billy Corgan	Atum: A Rock Opera in Three Acts (Act One)	2022	
"Birch Grove"	Billy Corgan	Cyr	2020	
"Black Forest, Black Hills"	Billy Corgan	Cyr	2020	
"Black Stars"	Billy Corgan	The Hunger Games: Sunrise on the Reaping (soundtrack)	2026	
"Blank Page"	Billy Corgan	Adore	1998	
"Blank"	Billy Corgan	The Aeroplane Flies High (B-side to "Tonight, Tonight")	1996	
"Bleeding the Orchid"	Billy Corgan	Zeitgeist	2007	
"Blew Away"	James Iha	Pisces Iscariot	1994	
"Blue" (Note: Later released on Pisces Iscariot)	Billy Corgan	Lull (EP)	1991	
"Blue Skies Bring Tears"	Billy Corgan	Machina/The Machines of God	2000	
"Blue Skies Wrought Tears"	Billy Corgan	Machina: Aranea Alba Editio	2025	
"Bodies"	Billy Corgan	Mellon Collie and the Infinite Sadness	1995	
"The Boy"	James Iha	The Aeroplane Flies High (B-side to "1979")	1996	
"Bring the Light"	Billy Corgan	Zeitgeist	2007	
"Bullet with Butterfly Wings" †	Billy Corgan	Mellon Collie and the Infinite Sadness	1995	
"Bury Me"	Billy Corgan	Gish	1991	
"Butterfly Suite"	Billy Corgan	Atum: A Rock Opera in Three Acts (Act One)	2022	
"By Starlight"	Billy Corgan	Mellon Collie and the Infinite Sadness	1995	
"Bye June"	Billy Corgan	Lull (EP)	1991	
"Canary Trainer"	Billy Corgan	Atum: A Rock Opera in Three Acts (Act Three)	2023	
"Cash Car Star"	Billy Corgan	Machina II/The Friends & Enemies of Modern Music	2000	
"The Celestials" †	Billy Corgan	Oceania	2012	
"Cenotaph"	Billy Corgan	Atum: A Rock Opera in Three Acts (Act Three)	2023	
"Cherry"	Billy Corgan	The Aeroplane Flies High (B-side to "1979")	1996	
"Cherub Rock" †	Billy Corgan	Siamese Dream	1993	
"The Chimera"	Billy Corgan	Oceania	2012	
"Chrome Jets"	Billy Corgan	Non-album single	2025	
"Clones (We're All)" # (Alice Cooper cover)	David Carron	The Aeroplane Flies High (B-side to "Bullet with Butterfly Wings")	1996	
"The Colour of Love" †	Billy Corgan	Cyr	2020	
"(Come On) Let's Go!"	Billy Corgan	Zeitgeist	2007	
"Confessions of a Dopamine Addict" †	Billy Corgan	Cyr	2020	
"Cottonwood Symphony"	Billy Corgan	Teargarden by Kaleidyscope; Vol. 2: The Solstice Bare	2010	
"Crestfallen"	Billy Corgan	Adore	1998	
"Crush"	Billy Corgan	Gish	1991	
"The Crying Tree of Mercury"	Billy Corgan	Machina/The Machines of God	2000	
"The Culling"	Billy Corgan	Atum: A Rock Opera in Three Acts (Act Two)	2023	
"Cupid de Locke"	Billy Corgan	Mellon Collie and the Infinite Sadness	1995	
"Cyr" †	Billy Corgan	Cyr	2020	
"Daphne Descends"	Billy Corgan	Adore	1998	
"Daughter" †	Billy Corgan	Non-album promotional single	1992	
"Daydream"	Billy Corgan	Gish	1991	
"Death From Above"	Billy Corgan	Zeitgeist	2007	
"Destination Unknown" # (Missing Persons cover)	Dale Bozzio; Terry Bozzio; Warren Cuccurullo	The Aeroplane Flies High (B-side to "Bullet with Butterfly Wings")	1996	
"Disarm" †	Billy Corgan	Siamese Dream	1993	
"Don't Wanna Be Your Lover"	Billy Corgan	Machina: Aranea Alba Editio	2025	
"Doomsday Clock"	Billy Corgan	Zeitgeist	2007	
"Dorian"	Billy Corgan	Monuments to an Elegy	2014	
"Drain"	Billy Corgan	Machina: Aranea Alba Editio	2025	
"Dreaming" # (Blondie cover)	Debbie Harry; Chris Stein	The Aeroplane Flies High (B-side to "Bullet with Butterfly Wings")	1996	
"Dross"	Billy Corgan	Machina II/The Friends & Enemies of Modern Music	2000	
"Drown"	Billy Corgan	Singles: Original Motion Picture Soundtrack	1992	
"Drum + Fife" †	Billy Corgan	Monuments to an Elegy	2014	
"Dulcet in E"	Billy Corgan	Cyr	2020	
"Edin"	Billy Corgan	Aghori Mhori Mei	2024	
"Embracer"	Billy Corgan	Atum: A Rock Opera in Three Acts (Act One)	2022	
"Empires" †	Billy Corgan	Atum: A Rock Opera in Three Acts (Act Two)	2023	
"The End Is the Beginning Is the End" †	Billy Corgan	Music from and Inspired by the "Batman & Robin" Motion Picture	1997	
"End of the Joke"	Billy Corgan	Machina: Aranea Alba Editio	2025	
"The Everlasting Gaze"	Billy Corgan	Machina/The Machines of God	2000	
"Every Morning"	Billy Corgan	Atum: A Rock Opera in Three Acts (Act Two)	2023	
"Eye"	Billy Corgan	Lost Highway (soundtrack)	1997	
"Farewell and Goodnight"	James Iha	Mellon Collie and the Infinite Sadness	1995	
"The Fellowship"	Billy Corgan	Teargarden by Kaleidyscope; Vol. 2: The Solstice Bare	2010	
"Fireflies"	Billy Corgan	Atum: A Rock Opera in Three Acts (Act Three)	2023	
"For God and Country"	Billy Corgan	Zeitgeist	2007	
"For Martha"	Billy Corgan	Adore	1998	
"Formosa"	Billy Corgan	Aghori Mhori Mei (Madame ZuZu's edition)	2024	
"Frail and Bedazzled"	Billy Corgan	Pisces Iscariot	1994	
"Freak" † (Also known as "Freak U.S.A.")	Billy Corgan	Teargarden by Kaleidyscope; Vol. 2: The Solstice Bare	2010	
"Fuck You (An Ode to No One)"	Billy Corgan	Mellon Collie and the Infinite Sadness	1995	
"Galapogos"	Billy Corgan	Mellon Collie and the Infinite Sadness	1995	
"Geek U.S.A."	Billy Corgan	Siamese Dream	1993	
"Girl Names Sandoz" # (The Animals cover)	Eric Burdon; John Weider	Peel Sessions	1992	
"Glass" (Note: Also known as "Glass' Theme")	Billy Corgan	Machina II/The Friends & Enemies of Modern Music	2000	
"Glass and the Ghost Children"	Billy Corgan	Machina/The Machines of God	2000	
"Glissandra"	Billy Corgan	Oceania	2012	
"G.L.O.W." †	Billy Corgan	Non-album single	2008	
"Go"	James Iha	Machina II/The Friends & Enemies of Modern Music	2000	
"God"	Billy Corgan	The Aeroplane Flies High (B-side to "Zero")	1996	
"God's Promise"	Billy Corgan	Machina: Aranea Alba Editio	2025	
"Goeth the Fall"	Billy Corgan	Aghori Mhori Mei	2024	
"The Gold Mask"	Billy Corgan	Atum: A Rock Opera in Three Acts (Act One)	2022	
"The Good in Goodbye"	Billy Corgan	Atum: A Rock Opera in Three Acts (Act One)	2022	
"Harmageddon"	Billy Corgan	Atum: A Rock Opera in Three Acts (Act Three)	2023	
"Haunted"	Billy Corgan	Cyr	2020	
"Heavy Metal Machine"	Billy Corgan	Machina/The Machines of God	2000	
"Hello Kitty Kat"	Billy Corgan	Pisces Iscariot	1994	
"Here Is No Why"	Billy Corgan	Mellon Collie and the Infinite Sadness	1995	
"Here's to the Atom Bomb"	Billy Corgan	Machina: Aranea Alba Editio	2025	
"Here's to the Atom Bomb, Too"	Billy Corgan	Machina: Aranea Alba Editio	2025	
"The Hidden Sun"	Billy Corgan	Cyr	2020	
"HMM"	Billy Corgan	Machina: Aranea Alba Editio	2025	
"Home"	Billy Corgan	Machina II/The Friends & Enemies of Modern Music	2000	
"Hooligan"	Billy Corgan	Atum: A Rock Opera in Three Acts (Act One)	2022	
"Hooray!"	Billy Corgan	Atum: A Rock Opera in Three Acts (Act One)	2022	
"Hummer"	Billy Corgan	Siamese Dream	1993	
"I Am One" †	Billy Corgan; James Iha	Gish	1991	
"I of the Mourning"	Billy Corgan	Machina/The Machines of God	2000	
"Identify" (Natalie Imbruglia cover)	Billy Corgan; Mike Garson	Machina: Aranea Alba Editio	2025	
"If There Is a God"	Billy Corgan	Machina II/The Friends & Enemies of Modern Music	2000	
"The Imploding Voice"	Billy Corgan	Machina/The Machines of God	2000	
"In Lieu of Failure"	Billy Corgan	Atum: A Rock Opera in Three Acts (Act Three)	2023	
"In My Body"	Billy Corgan	Machina II/The Friends & Enemies of Modern Music	2000	
"In the Arms of Sleep"	Billy Corgan	Mellon Collie and the Infinite Sadness	1995	
"Infinite Sadness"	Billy Corgan	Mellon Collie and the Infinite Sadness (LP edition)	1995	
"Inkless"	Billy Corgan	Oceania	2012	
"Innosense"	Billy Corgan; James Iha	Machina II/The Friends & Enemies of Modern Music	2000	
"Intergalactic"	Billy Corgan	Atum: A Rock Opera in Three Acts (Act Three)	2023	
"Jellybelly"	Billy Corgan	Mellon Collie and the Infinite Sadness	1995	
"Jupiter's Lament"	Billy Corgan	The Aeroplane Flies High (B-side to "Tonight, Tonight")	1996	
"Knights of Malta"	Billy Corgan	Shiny and Oh So Bright, Vol. 1 / LP: No Past. No Future. No Sun.	2018	
"Landslide" # (Fleetwood Mac cover)	Stevie Nicks	Pisces Iscariot	1994	
"The Last Song"	Billy Corgan	The Aeroplane Flies High (B-side to "Thirty-Three")	1996	
"Laugh"	Billy Corgan	Machina: Aranea Alba Editio	2025	
"Le Deux Machina"	Billy Corgan	Machina II/The Friends & Enemies of Modern Music	2000	
"Let Me Give the World to You"	Billy Corgan	Machina II/The Friends & Enemies of Modern Music	2000	
"Lightning Strikes"	Billy Corgan	Teargarden by Kaleidyscope; Vol. 3	2011	
"Lily (My One and Only)"	Billy Corgan	Mellon Collie and the Infinite Sadness	1995	
"Love"	Billy Corgan	Mellon Collie and the Infinite Sadness	1995	
"Lucky 13"	Billy Corgan	Machina II/The Friends & Enemies of Modern Music	2000	
"Luna"	Billy Corgan	Siamese Dream	1993	
"Ma Belle"	Billy Corgan	Zeitgeist	2007	
"Machina, Machina"	Billy Corgan	Machina: Aranea Alba Editio	2025	
"Machina Theme"	Billy Corgan	Machina: Aranea Alba Editio	2025	
"Marchin' On"	Billy Corgan	Shiny and Oh So Bright, Vol. 1 / LP: No Past. No Future. No Sun.	2018	
"Marquis in Spades"	Billy Corgan	The Aeroplane Flies High (B-side to "Zero")	1996	
"Mayonaise"	Billy Corgan; James Iha	Siamese Dream	1993	
"Medellia of the Gray Skies"	Billy Corgan	The Aeroplane Flies High (B-side to "Tonight, Tonight")	1996	
"Meladori Magpie"	Billy Corgan	The Aeroplane Flies High (B-side to "Tonight, Tonight")	1996	
"Mellon Collie and the Infinite Sadness" (instrumental)	Billy Corgan	Mellon Collie and the Infinite Sadness	1995	
"Minerva"	Billy Corgan	Cyr	2020	
"Monuments"	Billy Corgan	Monuments to an Elegy	2014	
"Moss"	Billy Corgan	Atum: A Rock Opera in Three Acts (Act Two)	2023	
"Mouths of Babes"	Billy Corgan	The Aeroplane Flies High (B-side to "Zero")	1996	
"Murnau"	Billy Corgan	Aghori Mhori Mei	2024	
"Muzzle"	Billy Corgan	Mellon Collie and the Infinite Sadness	1995	
"My Blue Heaven" #	Walter Donaldson; George A. Whiting	The Aeroplane Flies High (B-side to "Thirty-Three")	1996	
"My Love Is Winter"	Billy Corgan	Oceania	2012	
"Neophyte"	Billy Corgan	Atum: A Rock Opera in Three Acts (Act Two)	2023	
"Neverlost"	Billy Corgan	Zeitgeist	2007	
"A Night Like This" # (The Cure cover)	Robert Smith	The Aeroplane Flies High (B-side to "Bullet with Butterfly Wings")	1996	
"Night Waves"	Billy Corgan	Atum: A Rock Opera in Three Acts (Act Two)	2023	
"Not Worth Asking"	Billy Corgan	Non-album single B-side to "I Am One"	1990	
"Obscured"	Billy Corgan	Pisces Iscariot	1994	
"Oceania"	Billy Corgan	Oceania	2012	
"Of Wings"	Billy Corgan	Atum: A Rock Opera in Three Acts (Act Three)	2023	
"Once Upon a Time"	Billy Corgan	Adore	1998	
"One and All (We Are)" †	Billy Corgan	Monuments to an Elegy	2014	
"One Diamond, One Heart"	Billy Corgan	Oceania	2012	
"One Moment"	Billy Corgan	Machina: Aranea Alba Editio	2025	
"Our Lady of Sorrows"	Billy Corgan	Aghori Mhori Mei (Madame ZuZu's edition)	2024	
"Owata" †	Billy Corgan	Teargarden by Kaleidyscope; Vol. 3	2011	
"Pacer"	Billy Corgan	Atum: A Rock Opera in Three Acts (Act Three)	2023	
"Pale Horse"	Billy Corgan	Oceania	2012	
"Pale Scales"	Billy Corgan	Machina: Aranea Alba Editio	2025	
"Panopticon" †	Billy Corgan	Oceania	2012	
"Pastichio Medley" (Note: Medley of over 70 songs, or which in order are: "The Demon", "Thunderbolt", "Dearth", "Knuckles", "Star Song", "Firepower", "New Waver". "Space Jam", "Zoom", "So Very Sad About Us", "Phang", "Speed Racer", "The Eternal E", "Hairy Eyeball", "The Groover", "Hell Bent for Hell", "Rachel", "A Dog's Prayer", "Blast", "The Black Rider", "Slurpee", "Flipper", "The Viper", "Bitch", "Fried", "Harmonio", "U.S.A.", "The Tracer", "Envelope Woman", "Plastic Guy", "Glasgow 3am", "The Road Is Long", "Funkified", "Rigamarole", "Depresso", "The Streets Are Hot Tonite", "Dawn at 16", "Spazmatazz", "Fucker", "In the Arms of Sheep", "Speed", "77", "Me Rock You Show", "Feelium", "Is Alex Milton, "Rubberman", "Spacer", "Rock Me", "Weeping Willowly", "Rings", "So So Pretty", "Lucky Lad", "Jackboot", "Millieu", "Disconnected", "Let Your Lazer Love Light Shine Down", "Phreak", "Porkbelly", "Robot Lover", "Jimmy James", "America", "Slinkeepie", "Dummy Tum Tummy", "Fakir", "Jake", "Camaro", "Moonkids", "Make It Fungus", "V-8", and "Die".)	Billy Corgan; James Iha; D'arcy Wretzky; Jimmy Chamberlin	The Aeroplane Flies High (B-side to "Zero")	1996	
"Pennies"	Billy Corgan	The Aeroplane Flies High (B-side to "Zero")	1996	
"Pentagrams"	Billy Corgan	Aghori Mhori Mei	2024	
"Pentecost"	Billy Corgan	Aghori Mhori Mei	2024	
"Perfect" †	Billy Corgan	Adore	1998	
"Pinwheels"	Billy Corgan	Oceania	2012	
"Pissant"	Billy Corgan	Pisces Iscariot	1994	
"Plume"	Billy Corgan; James Iha	Pisces Iscariot	1994	
"Pomp and Circumstances"	Billy Corgan	Zeitgeist	2007	
"Porcelina of the Vast Oceans"	Billy Corgan	Mellon Collie and the Infinite Sadness	1995	
"Pox"	Billy Corgan	American Gothic (EP)	2008	
"Promise"	Billy Corgan	Machina: Aranea Alba Editio	2025	
"Pug"	Billy Corgan	Adore	1998	
"Purple Blood" †	Billy Corgan	Cyr	2020	
"Quasar"	Billy Corgan	Oceania	2012	
"Quiet"	Billy Corgan	Siamese Dream	1993	
"Raindrops + Sunshowers"	Billy Corgan	Machina/The Machines of God	2000	
"Rainy Day Song"	James Iha	Machina: Aranea Alba Editio	2025	
"Ramona" †	Billy Corgan	Cyr	2020	
"Real Love"	Billy Corgan	Machina II/The Friends & Enemies of Modern Music	2000	
"Rhinoceros" †	Billy Corgan	Gish	1991	
"Rock On" # (David Essex cover)	David Essex	Machina: Aranea Alba Editio	2025	
"Rocket" †	Billy Corgan	Siamese Dream	1993	
"The Rose March"	Billy Corgan	American Gothic (EP)	2008	
"Rotten Apples"	Billy Corgan	The Aeroplane Flies High (B-side to "Tonight, Tonight")	1996	
"Run2Me"	Billy Corgan	Monuments to an Elegy	2014	
"The Sacred and Profane"	Billy Corgan	Machina/The Machines of God	2000	
"...Said Sadly"	James Iha	The Aeroplane Flies High (B-side to "Bullet with Butterfly Wings")	1996	
"Saturnine"	Billy Corgan	Machina II/The Friends & Enemies of Modern Music	2000	
"Save Your Tears"	Billy Corgan	Cyr	2020	
"Schaudenfreud"	Billy Corgan	Cyr	2020	
"Seek and You Shall Destroy"	Billy Corgan	Shiny and Oh So Bright, Vol. 1 / LP: No Past. No Future. No Sun.	2018	
"Set the Ray to Jerry"	Billy Corgan	The Aeroplane Flies High (B-side to "1979")	1996	
"Shame"	Billy Corgan	Adore	1998	
"Sicarus"	Billy Corgan	Aghori Mhori Mei	2024	
"Sighommi" †	Billy Corgan	Aghori Mhori Mei	2024	
"Silverfuck"	Billy Corgan	Siamese Dream	1993	
"Silvery Sometimes (Ghosts)" †	Billy Corgan	Shiny and Oh So Bright, Vol. 1 / LP: No Past. No Future. No Sun.	2018	
"Siva" †	Billy Corgan	Gish	1991	
"Sleeping Giant"	Billy Corgan	Machina: Aranea Alba Editio	2025	
"Slow Dawn"	Billy Corgan	Machina II/The Friends & Enemies of Modern Music	2000	
"Slunk"	Billy Corgan	Lull (EP)	1991	
"Smiley"	Billy Corgan	Peel Sessions	1992	
"Snail"	Billy Corgan	Gish	1991	
"Sojourner"	Billy Corgan	Atum: A Rock Opera in Three Acts (Act Three)	2023	
"Solara" †	Billy Corgan	Shiny and Oh So Bright, Vol. 1 / LP: No Past. No Future. No Sun.	2018	
"Soma"	Billy Corgan; James Iha	Siamese Dream	1993	
"A Song for a Son"	Billy Corgan	Teargarden by Kaleidyscope; Vol. 1: Songs for a Sailor	2010	
"Soot + Stars"	Billy Corgan	Machina: Aranea Alba Editio	2025	
"Soothe"	Billy Corgan	Pisces Iscariot	1994	
"Soul Power" # (James Brown cover)	James Brown	Machina II/The Friends & Enemies of Modern Music	2000	
"Space Age"	Billy Corgan	Atum: A Rock Opera in Three Acts (Act Two)	2023	
"Spaceboy"	Billy Corgan	Siamese Dream	1993	
"Spaced"	Billy Corgan	Pisces Iscariot	1994	
"Spangled"	Billy Corgan	Teargarden by Kaleidyscope; Vol. 2: The Solstice Bare	2010	
"Speed Kills"	Billy Corgan	Machina II/The Friends & Enemies of Modern Music	2000	
"Spellbinding" †	Billy Corgan	Atum: A Rock Opera in Three Acts (Act Three)	2023	
"Springtimes"	Billy Corgan	Atum: A Rock Opera in Three Acts (Act Two)	2023	
"Stand Inside Your Love" †	Billy Corgan	Machina/The Machines of God	2000	
"Starla"	Billy Corgan	Pisces Iscariot	1994	
"Starrcraft"	Billy Corgan	Cyr	2020	
"Starz"	Billy Corgan	Zeitgeist	2007	
"Stellar"	Billy Corgan	Zeitgeist	2007	
"Steps in Time"	Billy Corgan	Atum: A Rock Opera in Three Acts (Act One)	2022	
"A Stitch in Time"	Billy Corgan	Teargarden by Kaleidyscope; Vol. 1: Songs for a Sailor	2010	
"Stumbleine"	Billy Corgan	Mellon Collie and the Infinite Sadness	1995	
"Suffer"	Billy Corgan	Gish	1991	
"Summer"	James Iha	Non-album single B-side to "Perfect"	1998	
"Sunkissed"	Billy Corgan	American Gothic (EP)	2008	
"Sweet Sweet"	Billy Corgan	Siamese Dream	1993	
"Take Me Down"	James Iha	Mellon Collie and the Infinite Sadness	1995	
"The Tale of Dusty and Pistol Pete"	Billy Corgan	Adore	1998	
"Tales of a Scorched Earth"	Billy Corgan	Mellon Collie and the Infinite Sadness	1995	
"Tarantula" †	Billy Corgan	Zeitgeist	2007	
"Tear"	Billy Corgan	Adore	1998	
"Telegenix"	Billy Corgan	Cyr	2020	
"That Which Animates the Spirit"	Billy Corgan	Atum: A Rock Opera in Three Acts (Act Three)	2023	
"That is the Way (My Love Is)" †	Billy Corgan	Zeitgeist	2007	
"Thirty-Three" †	Billy Corgan	Mellon Collie and the Infinite Sadness	1995	
"This Time"	Billy Corgan	Machina/The Machines of God	2000	
"Thru the Eyes of Ruby"	Billy Corgan	Mellon Collie and the Infinite Sadness	1995	
"Tiberius"	Billy Corgan	Monuments to an Elegy	2014	
"To Forgive"	Billy Corgan	Mellon Collie and the Infinite Sadness	1995	
"To Sheila"	Billy Corgan	Adore	1998	
"To the Grays"	Billy Corgan	Atum: A Rock Opera in Three Acts (Act Two)	2023	
"Today" †	Billy Corgan	Siamese Dream	1993	
"Tom Tom"	Billy Corgan	Teargarden by Kaleidyscope; Vol. 2: The Solstice Bare	2010	
"Tonite Reprise" (Note: Also released on Mellon Collie and the Infinite Sadness (LP edition))	Billy Corgan	The Aeroplane Flies High (B-side to "Tonight, Tonight")	1996	
"Tonight, Tonight" †	Billy Corgan	Mellon Collie and the Infinite Sadness	1995	
"Transformer"	Billy Corgan	The Aeroplane Flies High (B-side to "Thirty-Three")	1996	
"Travels"	Billy Corgan	Shiny and Oh So Bright, Vol. 1 / LP: No Past. No Future. No Sun.	2018	
"Tribute to Johnny"	Billy Corgan; James Iha	The Aeroplane Flies High (B-side to "Zero")	1996	
"Tristessa" †	Billy Corgan	Gish	1991	
"Try, Try, Try" †	Billy Corgan	Machina/The Machines of God	2000	
"Try (Again)"	Billy Corgan	Machina: Aranea Alba Editio	2025	
"Tyger, Tyger"	Billy Corgan	Cyr	2020	
"Ugly"	Billy Corgan	The Aeroplane Flies High (B-side to "1979")	1996	
"United States"	Billy Corgan	Zeitgeist	2007	
"Untitled" †	Billy Corgan	Rotten Apples	2000	
"Vanity"	Billy Corgan	Machina II/The Friends & Enemies of Modern Music	2000	
"Violet Rays"	Billy Corgan	Oceania	2012	
"War Dreams of Itself"	Billy Corgan	Aghori Mhori Mei	2024	
"We Only Come Out at Night"	Billy Corgan	Mellon Collie and the Infinite Sadness	1995	
"Where Boys Fear to Tread"	Billy Corgan	Mellon Collie and the Infinite Sadness	1995	
"Where Rain Must Fall"	Billy Corgan	Atum: A Rock Opera in Three Acts (Act One)	2022	
"Whir"	Billy Corgan	Pisces Iscariot	1994	
"White Spyder"	Billy Corgan	Machina II/The Friends & Enemies of Modern Music	2000	
"Who Goes There"	Billy Corgan	Aghori Mhori Mei	2024	
"Whyte Spyder"	Billy Corgan	Machina: Aranea Alba Editio	2025	
"Widow Wake My Mind"	Billy Corgan	Teargarden by Kaleidyscope; Vol. 1: Songs for a Sailor	2010	
"Wildflower"	Billy Corgan	Oceania	2012	
"Window Paine"	Billy Corgan	Gish	1991	
"Winterlong"	Billy Corgan	Machina: Aranea Alba Editio	2025	
"With Ado I Do"	Billy Corgan	Atum: A Rock Opera in Three Acts (Act One)	2022	
"With Every Light"	Billy Corgan	Machina/The Machines of God	2000	
"With Sympathy"	Billy Corgan; Jimmy Chamberlin	Shiny and Oh So Bright, Vol. 1 / LP: No Past. No Future. No Sun.	2018	
"Without You"	Billy Corgan	Machina: Aranea Alba Editio	2025	
"Wound"	Billy Corgan	Machina/The Machines of God	2000	
"Wrath"	Billy Corgan	Cyr	2020	
"Wyttch"	Billy Corgan	Cyr	2020	
"X.Y.U."	Billy Corgan	Mellon Collie and the Infinite Sadness	1995	
"Yet Another Promise"	Billy Corgan	Machina: Aranea Alba Editio	2025	
"You're All I've Got Tonight" # (The Cars cover)	Ric Ocasek	The Aeroplane Flies High (B-side to "Bullet with Butterfly Wings")	1996	
"Zeitgeist"	Billy Corgan	Zeitgeist	2007	
"Zero" †	Billy Corgan	Mellon Collie and the Infinite Sadness	1995	
"Zombie" (Yungblud featuring the Smashing Pumpkins)	Dominic Harrison; Matt Schwartz	Non-album single	2026	
