= The Smashing Pumpkins 1991–1998 =

1999 greatest hits album by the Smashing Pumpkins

Greatest hits album by The Smashing Pumpkins
- Released: December 1999
- Recorded: 1991–1998
- Genre: Alternative rock
- Length: 72:29
- Label: EMI/Virgin
- Producer: Butch Vig; Flood; Alan Moulder; Brad Wood; Billy Corgan

The Smashing Pumpkins chronology
The Aeroplane Flies High (1996)	The Smashing Pumpkins 1991–1998 (1999)	Rotten Apples (2001)

The Smashing Pumpkins 1991–1998 is a promotional-only greatest hits compilation album by alternative rock band the Smashing Pumpkins. It features all the commercial singles from the band's first four studio albums, the soundtrack-only tracks "Drown" and "Eye", and a cover of Fleetwood Mac's "Landslide", previously released on the 1994 collection Pisces Iscariot. It also contains an exclusive acoustic version of "Mayonaise".

== Track listing ==
No.	Title	Original release (year)	Length
1.	"Disarm"	Siamese Dream (1993)	3:17
2.	"Bullet with Butterfly Wings"	Mellon Collie and the Infinite Sadness (1995)	4:18
3.	"Ava Adore"	Adore (1998)	4:21
4.	"1979"	Mellon Collie and the Infinite Sadness (1995)	4:25
5.	"Landslide"	Pisces Iscariot (1994)	3:10
6.	"Cherub Rock"	Siamese Dream (1993)	4:58
7.	"I Am One"	Gish (1991)	4:07
8.	"Perfect"	Adore (1998)	3:23
9.	"Today"	Siamese Dream (1993)	3:19
10.	"Tonight, Tonight"	Mellon Collie and the Infinite Sadness (1995)	4:14
11.	"Mayonaise" (acoustic)	Previously unreleased	4:29
12.	"Siva"	Gish (1991)	4:20
13.	"Eye"	Lost Highway Soundtrack (1996)	4:51
14.	"Zero"	Mellon Collie and the Infinite Sadness (1995)	2:41
15.	"Pug"	Adore (1998)	4:47
16.	"Drown"	Singles: Original Motion Picture Soundtrack (1992)	4:30
17.	"Thirty-Three"	Mellon Collie and the Infinite Sadness (1995)	4:10
18.	"Rhinoceros"	Gish (1991)	6:32
