= Maxi single =

Music single release with more than two songs

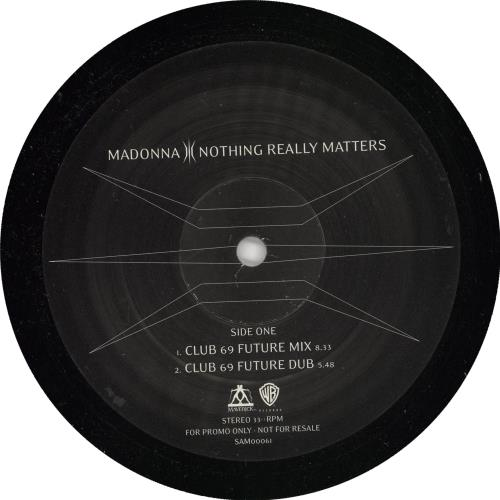
Madonna's UK promotional 12-inch maxi single "Nothing Really Matters", containing four remixes of the song

A maxi single, maxi-single, or maxi CD (sometimes abbreviated to MCD or CDM) is a music single release with more than the usual two tracks of an A-side song and a B-side song. Maxi singles are often mistaken for extended plays (EPs), especially in the digital era such as the categorization on iTunes, Apple Music, or Spotify. An EP usually consists of at least four different "songs" without any specific A-side, while a maxi-single may contain four or more tracks but only in form of remixes to complement one or two songs as the A-side. Billboard considers EPs for albums chart (Billboard 200) and considers maxi-singles for songs chart (Billboard Hot 100).

== First maxi singles ==
Mungo Jerry's first single, "In the Summertime", was the first maxi single in the world. The term came into wide use in the 1970s, where it usually referred to 7-inch vinyl singles featuring one track on the A-side and two on the B-side. The 1975 reissue of David Bowie's "Space Oddity", where the featured song is coupled with "Changes" and "Velvet Goldmine", is a typical example. By the mid-1970s, it was used to refer to 12" vinyl singles with three or four tracks (or an extended or remixed version of the lead single/song) on the A-side, with an additional two or three tracks on the B-side; the B-side was initially used by DJs. Later, in the 1980s, a typical practice was to release a two-song single on 7" vinyl and cassette, and a maxi-single on 12" vinyl.

These first 12" maxi-singles were promotional and mostly sent to discotheques and radio stations. Examples of such promos—released at almost the same time in 1975—are Gary Toms Empire – "Drive My Car", Don Downing – "Dream World", Barrabas – "Mellow Blow", The Trammps – "Hooked for Life", Ace Spectrum – "Keep Holdin' On", South Shore Commission – "Train Called Freedom", The Chequers – "Undecided Love", Ernie Bush – "Breakaway", Ralph Carter – "When You're Young and in Love", Michael Zager & The Moon Band Feat. Peabo Bryson – "Do It with Feeling", Monday After – "Merry-Go-Round", The Ritchie Family – "I Want to Dance" and Frankie Valli – "Swearin' to God".

Salsoul Records made 12" maxi-singles commercially available for the first time in May 1976 with the release of "Ten Percent" by Double Exposure (SALSOUL 12D-2008). An earlier 12" catalog number from this label is "More" by Carol Williams (SALSOUL 12D-2006), but it was released later.

== Cassette maxi singles ==
Occasionally, a cassette single was released in two cassette formats simultaneously: a traditional Cassette single with two tracks and a cassette maxi-single with four or more tracks, generally remixes. This practice was experimented with in the 1980s.

Example: Debbie Gibson – Out of the Blue (cassette maxi-single) released by Atlantic in 1987 in the US. Includes four mixes: 1. Club Mix, 2. Bonus Beats, 3. Drumapella, 4. Dub version. This was packaged in a 12" × 3" cassette maxi single longbox (with a regular cardboard slipcase/cassette inside), although most later maxi singles were just issued in regular style cassette cases.

== CD maxi singles ==
When CDs began to appear as a popular single format in the early 1990s (see CD single), songs were occasionally released in two CD formats simultaneously, 3" and 5", predominantly as a marketing ploy but potentially as a logical extension of the 7" and 12" vinyl record formats to CD, with the 5" CD sometimes marketed as a "maxi-single", most commonly in the US, and European countries (outside of the UK). While the 5" CD version occasionally had additional or longer track mixes, the track listing was often identical.

By the mid 1990s CDs had clearly become the music format of choice. As the 1990s progressed, nearly every single release was available on CD, and vinyl and cassette single releases gradually became less common.

The UK became a thriving market for CD singles, but in 1998 the UK Chart Supervisory Committee reduced the maximal playing time of chart-eligible CD singles from 40 minutes to 20 minutes, though 12" vinyl singles could still play for up to 40 minutes. While Maxi-CDs had been much loved among the dance community, as most if not all of the remixes that had been commissioned by the label could be released commercially, lobbying by artists in other genres who felt obliged to record extra and cover tracks to provide enough material for their single releases was responsible for the rule change. As a result, the U.K.'s singles from around mid-1998 often appeared as three separately-sold CDs with three tracks each, or more commonly, two CDs and an extra format (such as 7", 12" or DVD single). Very often, at least one track was common to all formats. Single releases in the US and elsewhere still included many tracks (primarily remixes) and called themselves maxi-singles to differentiate from the three-track UK versions.

Example: Saint Etienne – "Who Do You Think You Are?" (US CD single) Released by Warner Music in 1993 in the US. Includes eight different tracks, six of which are versions of the title song. Digipak packaging. Labeled "compact disc maxi-single" on the front cover.

Another extensive example is the collection of singles released for the award-winning Mellon Collie and the Infinite Sadness by The Smashing Pumpkins. Each of the five singles ("Bullet with Butterfly Wings", "1979", "Zero", "Tonight, Tonight", "Thirty-Three") had two or more additional songs; most of them had six or seven. All of the maxi singles were released together, with additional tracks on some, as The Aeroplane Flies High box set, for a total of thirty-three tracks across the five singles. Adding that to the total number of other unique tracks on the main CD and vinyl releases of the album itself brings the grand total track count of Mellon Collie to fifty-eight.

As a result of the 1998 UK Chart Supervisory Committee ruling on chart-eligible singles containing no more than 20 minutes of material, many of the U.K.'s dance music singles contained edited / faded mixes. This increased demand for imported European & American CD maxi singles in the UK, especially amongst DJs who required full-length tracks.

== Digital maxi singles ==
A digital maxi single is a series of digital downloads mostly containing remixes. Unlike a normal maxi single, tracks can be bought and sold based on preference. Even if a single had a maxi single and a digital maxi single released with exactly the same content, they were still counted differently on charts. For instance, the maxi single was counted as two points, while the digital maxi single (if all songs were downloaded and if the single were to contain the standard five tracks) was counted as ten points.

== Today ==
With music stores in the US devoting significantly less shelf space to singles, the format's future in the US remains in doubt. In the UK, having watched sales of CDs drop since the previous rule change, and amid allegations that the consumer no longer felt that UK-issued singles were good value for money, the Chart Supervisory Committee once again changed the rules governing the formats of singles released in the UK. From early 2003, a format described as a "Maxi-CD" was reintroduced, alongside a new two-track CD single with a lower retail price. The current rules in the U.K. allow for up to 40 minutes of audio tracks on a Maxi-CD, as long as all tracks are remixes of the title track. In practice, however, many of the U.K.'s Maxi-CDs still contain only three mixes and come nowhere near the maximal allowable playing time. However, releases on dance labels (such as EMI's Positiva) are nearly always Maxi-CDs in the true sense, with more than three mixes. Madonna and Lady Gaga are the rare examples of popular American artists who still released maxi-singles on physical formats into the 2010s.

Another example is Erasure's single "Breathe", released by Mute in 2005 in the US. It includes eight different tracks, six of which are versions of the title song, plus a CD-ROM section with the video of the title song, in a standard jewel case packaging.
