= The Aeroplane Flies High =

Box set by The Smashing Pumpkins
- Released: November 26, 1996
- Genre: Alternative rock
- Length: 138:53
- Label: Virgin
- Producers: Billy Corgan, James Iha, Flood, Alan Moulder, D'arcy Wretzky

The Smashing Pumpkins chronology
Mellon Collie and the Infinite Sadness (1995)	The Aeroplane Flies High (1996)	Adore (1998)

The Aeroplane Flies High is a five-disc box set released by American alternative rock band The Smashing Pumpkins in 1996. It contains expanded versions of the five singles from their album Mellon Collie and the Infinite Sadness and includes a 44-page booklet with pictures and writings by the band's lead singer Billy Corgan, as well as lyrics.

A limited edition release, the box reached number 42 on the Billboard 200. Originally intended to be limited to 200,000 copies, Virgin Records produced more after the original run sold out due to overwhelming and unexpected demand. The album was remastered in 2013 under the supervision of frontman Billy Corgan and reissued on vinyl and as a CD/DVD box set.

== Critical reception ==
Professional ratings
Review scores
Source	Rating
AllMusic	3/5 stars
Consequence	C+
Entertainment Weekly	B+
Pitchfork	7.0/10
Rolling Stone	4/5 stars
Spin	4/10

According to Tom Moon, writing for Rolling Stone, "Aeroplane is the Pumpkins’ Anthology 1, a cutting-room-floor companion piece to Mellon Collie that provides insight into Corgan's extraordinary creative outbursts. He has said that Mellon Collie was a transforming experience for the band, and Aeroplane shows how much the Pumpkins are still willing to take chances. And here's the scary part: There is no filler here. These supposedly second-string tracks are keepers. Aeroplane has its indulgent moments; the very exercise of anthologizing this material is megalomaniacal. But the ballads are as gorgeous as anything Corgan has ever written. The box also has small, ruminative pieces that are jarringly thoughtful and blasts of guitar riffage straight outta the corporate-rock ’70s."

== Deluxe release ==
In 2013, the Smashing Pumpkins issued a 6-disc deluxe version of The Aeroplane Flies High. According to Ian Cohen, writing for Pitchfork, "[t]he Aeroplane Flies High is not a beloved obscurity, nor is it a canonical album celebrating a milestone anniversary. It’s not even an album: it’s a widely available, 16-year old collection of B-sides from a double album. Granted, the Smashing Pumpkins' Mellon Collie and the Infinite Sadness was more judiciously edited than the title would lead you to believe. It was a 28-song double album all the same, and now Aeroplane nearly quadruples in size with 90 additional tracks on top of its original 33, with a bonus DVD to boot."

== Track listing ==
All tracks are written by Billy Corgan, except where noted.

"Bullet with Butterfly Wings"
No.	Title	Writer(s)	Length
1.	"Bullet with Butterfly Wings"		4:16
2.	"...Said Sadly"	James Iha	3:09
3.	"You're All I've Got Tonight"	Ric Ocasek	3:10
4.	"Clones (We're All)"	David Carron	2:43
5.	"A Night Like This"	Robert Smith	3:36
6.	"Destination Unknown"	Dale Bozzio, Terry Bozzio, Warren Cuccurullo	4:14
7.	"Dreaming"	Debbie Harry, Chris Stein	5:11

"1979"
No.	Title	Writer(s)	Length
1.	"1979"		4:28
2.	"Ugly"		2:52
3.	"The Boy"	Iha	3:04
4.	"Cherry"		4:02
5.	"Believe"	Iha	3:15
6.	"Set the Ray to Jerry"		4:10

"Zero"
No.	Title	Writer(s)	Length
1.	"Zero"		2:39
2.	"God"		3:09
3.	"Mouths of Babes"		3:46
4.	"Tribute to Johnny"	Corgan, Iha	2:34
5.	"Marquis in Spades"		3:17
6.	"Pennies"		2:28
7.	"Pastichio Medley" (mislabelled as 25:59 on disc)	Corgan, Iha, D'arcy Wretzky, Jimmy Chamberlin	22:57

The "Pastichio Medley" is a medley of riffs from a variety of sources recorded after Siamese Dream and before the completion of Mellon Collie and the Infinite Sadness. It features "The Demon", "Thunderbolt", "Dearth", "Knuckles", "Star Song", "Firepower", "New Waver", "Space Jam", "Zoom", "So Very Sad About Us", "Phang", "Speed Racer", "The Eternal E", "Hairy Eyeball", "The Groover", "Hell Bent for Hell", "Rachel", "A Dog's Prayer", "Blast", "The Black Rider", "Slurpee", "Flipper", "The Viper", "Bitch", "Fried", "Harmonio", "U.S.A.", "The Tracer", "Envelope Woman", "Plastic Guy", "Glasgow 3am", "The Road Is Long", "Funkified", "Rigamarole", "Depresso", "The Streets Are Hot Tonite", "Dawn at 16", "Spazmatazz", "Fucker", "In the Arms of Sheep", "Speed", "77", "Me Rock You Snow", "Feelium", "Is Alex Milton", "Rubberman", "Spacer", "Rock Me", "Weeping Willowly", "Rings", "So So Pretty", "Lucky Lad", "Jackboot", "Milieu", "Disconnected", "Let Your Lazer Love Light Shine Down", "Phreak", "Porkbelly", "Robot Lover", "Jimmy James", "America", "Slinkeepie", "Dummy Tum Tummy", "Fakir", "Jake", "Camaro", "Moonkids", "Make It Fungus", "V-8", and "Die".

"Rachel" bears a similar sound to, and is apparently an early version of, the Mellon Collie and the Infinite Sadness song "X.Y.U.". As well, "Disconnected" is an as-yet-to-be-completed instrumental version of "The Aeroplane Flies High (Turns Left, Looks Right)".

A full version of "U.S.A." was released on 2011's reissue of Siamese Dream; full versions of "Feelium", "Knuckles", "New Waver", "Zoom", "Phang", "Blast", and "Speed" were released on 2012's reissue of Mellon Collie and the Infinite Sadness; and full versions of "Milieu", "Jackboot", "Rings", "The Groover", and "Star Song" were released on 2013's reissue of The Aeroplane Flies High.

"Tonight, Tonight"
No.	Title	Length
1.	"Tonight, Tonight"	4:15
2.	"Meladori Magpie"	2:41
3.	"Rotten Apples"	3:02
4.	"Jupiter's Lament"	2:30
5.	"Medellia of the Gray Skies"	3:11
6.	"Blank"	2:54
7.	"Tonite Reprise"	2:40

"Tonite Reprise" is a solo acoustic version of "Tonight, Tonight" with slight alterations to the lyrics. It also appeared on the vinyl version of Mellon Collie.

"Thirty-Three"
No.	Title	Writer(s)	Length
1.	"Thirty-Three"		4:10
2.	"The Last Song"		3:55
3.	"The Aeroplane Flies High (Turns Left, Looks Right)"		8:31
4.	"Transformer"		3:25
5.	"The Bells"	Iha	2:17
6.	"My Blue Heaven"	Walter Donaldson, George A. Whiting	3:20

=== 2013 CD/DVD reissue ===
As part of EMI Music's extensive reissue campaign, a special edition of the album was released on 26 July 2013. The 6-CD set consists of the five original EPs, each now with added bonus tracks, as well as an additional CD of live material. In total the discs feature 90 tracks. The package also includes a DVD consisting of a live show in Belfort, France from 4 July 1997. The set was also released on vinyl as a 5-LP box set.

2013 Reissue CD 1: Bullet with Butterfly Wings
No.	Title	Writer(s)	Length
1.	"Bullet with Butterfly Wings"		4:16
2.	"...Said Sadly"	Iha	3:09
3.	"You're All I've Got Tonight"	Ocasek	3:10
4.	"Clones (We're All)"	Carron	2:43
5.	"A Night Like This"	Smith	3:36
6.	"Destination Unknown"	Dale Bozzio, Terry Bozzio, Cuccurullo	4:14
7.	"Dreaming"	Harry, Stein	5:11
8.	"Movers and Shakirs" (Gravity Studios demo)		2:41
9.	"Germans in Leather Pants" (Gravity Studios demo)		2:58
10.	"Millieu" (Gravity Studios demo)		1:37
11.	"Jackboot" (Gravity Studios demo)		5:08
12.	"A/Ab/E/B/F#" (Gravity Studios demo)		2:47
13.	"Rings" (Gravity Studios demo)		4:00
14.	"Ugly" (Gravity Studios demo)		3:06
15.	"Blaster Caster" (Gravity Studios demo)		1:07
16.	"Little Ditty" (Gravity Studios demo)		0:45
17.	"Verily I Say" (Gravity Studios demo)		0:51
18.	"New Waver" (Gravity Studios demo)		2:56
19.	"The Groover" (Gravity Studios demo)	Iha	5:17
20.	"Ravi Revi Roo" (Gravity Studios demo)		3:23
21.	"On the Loose" (Gravity Studios demo)		1:27
22.	"Slurry" (Gravity Studios demo)		4:40

2013 Reissue CD 2: 1979
No.	Title	Writer(s)	Length
1.	"1979"		4:28
2.	"Ugly"		2:52
3.	"The Boy"	Iha	3:04
4.	"Cherry"		4:02
5.	"Believe"	Iha	3:15
6.	"Set the Ray to Jerry"		4:10
7.	"Tonight, Tonight" (Acoustic version/instrumental rough)		4:15
8.	"Jupiter’s Lament" (Billy solo)		2:50
9.	"Zero" (8-track demo)		3:18
10.	"Marquis in Spades" (8-track demo)		2:55
11.	"Have Love Will Travel" (8-track demo)		4:20
12.	"Infinite Sadness" (Siamese Dream outtake)		3:48
13.	"1979" (Acoustic)		4:15
14.	"The Aeroplane Flies High (Turns Left, Looks Right)" (Acoustic snippet)		1:03
15.	"Take Me Down" (Instrumental)	Iha	2:50
16.	"Star Song" (DAT mix/Vocal rough)	Iha	5:42

2013 Reissue CD 3: Zero
No.	Title	Writer(s)	Length
1.	"Zero"		2:39
2.	"God"		3:09
3.	"Mouths of Babes"		3:46
4.	"Tribute to Johnny"	Corgan, Iha	2:34
5.	"Marquis in Spades"		3:17
6.	"Pennies"		2:28
7.	"Pastichio Medley"	Corgan, Iha, Wretzky, Chamberlin	22:57
8.	"By Starlight" (Live; 27 February 1995, Chicago, IL, USA)		4:04
9.	"Set the Ray to Jerry" (Live; 27 February 1995, Chicago, IL, USA)		4:17
10.	"Mouths of Babes" (Live; 27 February 1995, Chicago, IL, USA)		3:25
11.	"Cupid de Locke" (Live; 27 February 1995, Chicago, IL, USA)		2:59
12.	"Galapagos" (Live; 27 February 1995, Chicago, IL, USA)		4:36
13.	"To Forgive" (Live; 27 February 1995, Chicago, IL, USA)		4:00
14.	"Lily (My One and Only)" (Live; 27 February 1995, Chicago, IL, USA)		3:21
15.	"Here Is No Why" (Live; 27 February 1995, Chicago, IL, USA)		3:49

2013 Reissue CD 4: Tonight, Tonight
No.	Title	Writer(s)	Length
1.	"Tonight, Tonight"		4:15
2.	"Meladori Magpie"		2:41
3.	"Rotten Apples"		3:02
4.	"Jupiter's Lament"		2:30
5.	"Medellia of the Gray Skies"		3:11
6.	"Blank"		2:54
7.	"Tonite Reprise"		2:40
8.	"Stumbleine" (Live; 21 February 1995, Chicago, IL, USA)		3:07
9.	"Ugly" (Live; 27 February 1995, Chicago, IL, USA)		2:47
10.	"Meladori Magpie" (Live; 28 February 1995, Chicago, IL, USA)		2:53
11.	"God" (Live; 21 February 1995, Chicago, IL, USA)		3:10
12.	"Love" (Live; 28 February 1995, Chicago, IL, USA)		3:53
13.	"Pissant" (Live; 27 February 1995, Chicago, IL, USA)		3:32
14.	"Hello Kitty Kat" (Live; 27 February 1995, Chicago, IL, USA)		5:02
15.	"Special Winner’s Song (ad lib)" (Live; 28 February 1995, Chicago, IL, USA)	Billy Corgan, James Iha, D'arcy Wretzky, Chamberlin	4:28
16.	"I Just Want to Make Love to You" (Live; 28 February 1995, Chicago, IL, USA)	Willie Dixon	4:33

2013 Reissue CD 5: Thirty-Three
No.	Title	Writer(s)	Length
1.	"Thirty-Three"		4:10
2.	"The Last Song"		3:55
3.	"The Aeroplane Flies High (Turns Left, Looks Right)"		8:31
4.	"Transformer"		3:25
5.	"The Bells"	Iha	2:17
6.	"My Blue Heaven"	Walter Donaldson, George A. Whiting	3:20
7.	"Silverfuck" (Live; 10 July 1996, Landover, MD, USA)		34:48

2013 Reissue CD 6: Live Inside the Dark Globe
No.	Title	Length
1.	"Where Boys Fear To Tread" (Live; 3 July 1996, Cleveland, OH, USA)	4:41
2.	"Zero" (Live; 7 February 1996, San Francisco, CA, USA)	2:42
3.	"Fuck You (An Ode to No One)" (Live; 10 April 1996, Stockholm, Sweden)	4:23
4.	"X.Y.U." (Live; 3 February 1996, Los Angeles, CA, USA)	7:38
5.	"To Forgive" (Live; 6 January 1996, Washington DC, USA)	4:06
6.	"Thirty-Three" (Live; 11 January 1996, New York City, NY, USA)	4:04
7.	"Tonight, Tonight" (Live; 11 January 1996, New York City, NY, USA)	4:27
8.	"Lily (My One And Only)" (Live; 5 January 1996, Washington DC, USA)	3:31
9.	"Porcelina of the Vast Oceans" (Live; 3 July 1996, Cleveland, OH, USA)	12:33
10.	"Jellybelly" (Live; 6 April 1996, Gent, Belgium)	3:51
11.	"Bullet With Butterfly Wings" (Live; 3 February 1996, Los Angeles, CA, USA)	4:16
12.	"By Starlight" (Live; 2 July 1996, Buffalo, NY, USA)	5:11
13.	"Bodies" (Live; 5 July 1996, Philadelphia, PA, USA)	3:58
14.	"Silverfuck" (Live; 9 April 1996, Copenhagen, Denmark)	13:54

2013 Reissue bonus DVD: Live at Malsaucy Lake, Belfort, France; 4 July 1997
No.	Title	Writer(s)	Length
1.	"Glimpses" (Instrumental jam of The Yardbirds' song)	Jimmy Page, Jim McCarty, Keith Relf, Chris Dreja
2.	"Where Boys Fear To Tread"
3.	"Eye"
4.	"Tonight, Tonight"
5.	"Transformer"
6.	"Thru the Eyes of Ruby"
7.	"The End Is the Beginning Is the End"
8.	"By Starlight"
9.	"Bullet With Butterfly Wings"
10.	"Muzzle"
11.	"1979"
12.	"X.Y.U."
13.	"Porcelina of the Vast Oceans"
14.	"The Aeroplane Flies High (Turns Left, Looks Right)"

=== Promotional releases ===
To promote the original release of the box set, a four-track CD single was issued by Virgin Records America with customized cover sleeve and CD art.

US Virgin promo CD
No.	Title	Writer(s)	Length
1.	"The Last Song"		3:55
2.	"The Aeroplane Flies High (Turns Left, Looks Right)"		8:31
3.	"Transformer"		3:25
4.	"Destination Unknown"	Dale Bozzio/Terry Bozzio/Warren Cuccurullo	4:14

== Personnel ==
The Smashing Pumpkins

- Billy Corgan – vocals, guitar, piano, production, liner notes, mixing, illustrations
- James Iha – guitar; vocals on "...Said Sadly", "A Night Like This", "The Boy", "Believe", and "The Bells"; production; engineering; mixing
- D'arcy Wretzky – bass guitar, vocals on "Dreaming" and "The Bells", production, engineering, mixing
- Jimmy Chamberlin – drums (except DVD)

Additional musicians

- Keith Brown – piano
- Bill Corgan Sr. – guitar solo on "The Last Song"
- Dennis Flemion – instruments on "Medellia of the Gray Skies"
- Jimmy Flemion – instruments on "Medellia of the Gray Skies"
- Nina Gordon – vocals on "...Said Sadly"
- Adam Schlesinger – piano on "The Bells"
- Eric Remschneider – cello on "The Bells" and "My Blue Heaven"
- Chris Martin – piano on "My Blue Heaven"
- Jonathan Melvoin – keyboards on CD 6 (Live 1996)
- Matt Walker – drums on DVD

Production

- Andy Chase – engineer
- John Craig – illustrations
- Paul Elledge – photography
- Flood – production, engineering, mixing
- Jeff Lane – mixing
- Tommy Lipnick – engineering
- Jeff Moleski – engineering, mixing
- Tommy Moleski – engineering
- Alan Moulder – production, mixing
- J. Nicholas – mixing, mixing assistant
- Frank Olinsky – art direction, design
- Neil Perry – mixing
- Claudine Pontier – engineering
- Russ Spice – engineering
- Howie Weinberg – mastering
- Martin White – engineering
- Yelena Yemchuk – photography, "Zero" cover art

== Charts ==
Year	Chart	Position
1996	US Billboard 200	42
