= List of awards and nominations received by the Smashing Pumpkins =

This is a list of awards and nominations received by The Smashing Pumpkins.

== American Music Awards ==
The American Music Award is an annual American music awards show, created by Dick Clark in 1973 for ABC when the network's contract to present the Grammy Awards expired.

Year	Nominee / work	Award	Result
1997	The Smashing Pumpkins	Favorite Alternative Artist	Won
1997	The Smashing Pumpkins	Favorite Heavy Metal/Hard Rock Artist	Nominated

== Antville Music Video Awards ==
The Antville Music Video Awards are online awards for the best music video and music video directors of the year. They were first awarded in 2005.

Year	Nominee / work	Award	Result
2007	"Tarantula"	Worst Video	Nominated

== Brit Awards ==
The Brit Awards are the British Phonographic Industry's annual pop music awards.

Year	Nominee / work	Award	Result
1997	The Smashing Pumpkins	International Group	Nominated

== Clio Awards ==
Year	Nominee / work	Award	Result	Ref.
2026	Sparkling Poster	Design - Gig Poster	Nominated	

== D&AD Awards ==
Design and Art Direction (D&AD) is a British educational charity which exists to promote excellence in design and advertising.

Year	Nominee / work	Award	Result
1997	"1979"	Cinematography	Graphite Pencil
1997	"1979"	Direction	Graphite Pencil

== Danish Music Awards ==
The Danish Music Awards (DMA) is a Danish award show. The show has been arranged by IFPI since 1989, and was originally called IFPI-prisen ("IFPI-Award") until 1991, when it changed its name to Dansk Grammy ("Danish Grammy"). The current name was given in 2001, after the American Grammy Awards registered the name Grammy as their trademark. In 2011 IFPI joined with TV2 (Denmark) and KODA to present the awards ceremony.

Year	Nominee / work	Award	Result	Ref.
1999	Adore	Best International Album	Nominated	

== GAFFA-Prisen Awards ==
Delivered since 1991. The GAFFA Awards (Danish: GAFFA Prisen) are a Danish award that rewards popular music, awarded by the GAFFA magazine.

Year	Nominee / work	Award	Result
1995	Mellon Collie and the Infinite Sadness	Best Foreign Album	Nominated
1998	Adore	Best Foreign Album	Nominated
1998	"Ava Adore"	Best Foreign Hit	Nominated
1998	Billy Corgan	Best Foreign Male Act	Nominated
1998	The Smashing Pumpkins	Best Foreign Live Act	Nominated
1998	The Smashing Pumpkins	Best Foreign Band	Nominated
2019	The Smashing Pumpkins	Best Foreign Band	Nominated
2019	Shiny and Oh So Bright, Vol. 1 / LP: No Past. No Future. No Sun.	Best Foreign Album	Nominated
2021	Cyr	Best Foreign Album	Nominated
2021	The Smashing Pumpkins	Best Foreign Band	Nominated

== Grammy Awards ==
The Grammy Award is an honor awarded by The Recording Academy to recognize outstanding achievement in the mainly English-language music industry. The Smashing Pumpkins have received eleven nominations and winning two times in the Best Hard Rock Performance category.

Year	Nominee / work	Award	Result
1994	"Cherub Rock"	Best Hard Rock Performance	Nominated
1994	Siamese Dream	Best Alternative Music Album	Nominated
1997	Mellon Collie and the Infinite Sadness	Album of the Year	Nominated
1997	Mellon Collie and the Infinite Sadness	Best Alternative Music Album	Nominated
1997	"1979"	Record of the Year	Nominated
1997	"1979"	Best Rock Performance by a Duo or Group with Vocal	Nominated
1997	"Mellon Collie and the Infinite Sadness"	Best Pop Instrumental Performance	Nominated
1997	"Bullet with Butterfly Wings"	Best Hard Rock Performance	Won
1997	"Tonight, Tonight"	Best Music Video	Nominated
1998	"The End Is the Beginning Is the End"	Best Hard Rock Performance	Won
1999	Adore	Best Alternative Music Album	Nominated
2001	Machina/The Machines of God	Best Recording Package	Nominated

== Juno Awards ==
The Juno Award are presented annually to Canadians musical artists and bands to acknowledge their artistic and technical achievements in all aspects of music.

Year	Nominee / work	Award	Result
1997	Mellon Collie and the Infinite Sadness	International Album of the Year	Nominated

== Lunas del Auditorio ==
Lunas del Auditorio are sponsored by The National Auditorium in Mexico to honor the best live shows in the country.

Year	Nominee / work	Award	Result
2008	The Smashing Pumpkins	Best Foreign Rock Artist	Nominated

== MTV Europe Music Awards ==
The MTV Europe Music Awards are an event presented by Viacom International Media Networks Europe which awards prizes to musicians and performers.

Year	Nominee / work	Award	Result
1996	The Smashing Pumpkins	Best Group	Nominated
1996	The Smashing Pumpkins	Best Rock	Won
1998	The Smashing Pumpkins	Best Rock	Nominated

== MTV Video Music Awards ==
The MTV Video Music Award is an award presented by the cable channel MTV to honor the best in the music video medium. The Smashing Pumpkins have received fifteen nominations and seven wins.

Year	Nominee / work	Award	Result
1994	"Disarm"	Best Alternative Video	Nominated
1994	"Disarm"	Best Editing	Nominated
1996	"Tonight, Tonight"	Video of the Year	Won
1996	"Tonight, Tonight"	Breakthrough Video	Won
1996	"Tonight, Tonight"	Best Direction	Won
1996	"Tonight, Tonight"	Best Visual Effects	Won
1996	"Tonight, Tonight"	Best Art Direction	Won
1996	"Tonight, Tonight"	Best Editing	Nominated
1996	"Tonight, Tonight"	Best Cinematography	Won
1996	"Tonight, Tonight"	Viewer's Choice	Nominated
1996	"1979"	Best Alternative Video	Won
1997	"The End Is the Beginning Is the End"	Best Direction	Nominated
1997	"The End Is the Beginning Is the End"	Best Visual Effects	Nominated
1997	"The End Is the Beginning Is the End"	Best Editing	Nominated
1997	"The End Is the Beginning Is the End"	Best Cinematography	Nominated
1999	The Smashing Pumpkins Website	Best Artist Website	Nominated

== Music Video Production Awards ==
The MVPA Awards are annually presented by a Los Angeles–based music trade organization to honor the year's best music videos.

Year	Nominee / work	Award	Result
1999	"Ava Adore"	Video of the Year	Nominated
2006	The Smashing Pumpkins	Kratz Award for Creative Excellence	Won
2008	"That's the Way (My Love Is)"	Best Computer Effects	Nominated

== NME Awards ==
The NME Awards were created by the NME magazine and was first held in 1953. The Smashing Pumpkins has received two nominations.

Year	Nominee / work	Award	Result
1999	Adore	Best Album	Nominated
2013	Mellon Collie and the Infinite Sadness	Best Reissue	Nominated
2015	Adore	Best Reissue	Nominated

== Polstar Concert Industry Awards ==
The Pollstar Concert Industry Awards aim to reward the best in the business of shows and concerts.

Year	Nominee / work	Award	Result
1992	Themselves	Best New Rock Artist	Nominated
1994	Tour	Club Tour of the Year	Won
1997	Tour	Major Tour of the Year	Nominated

== UK Festival Awards ==
Year	Nominee / work	Award	Result	Ref.
2007	The Smashing Pumpkins	Best Headline Act	Nominated	

== VH1 Fashion Awards ==
Year	Nominee / work	Award	Result	Ref.
2000	"Stand Inside Your Love"	Visionary Award	Won	

== Žebřík Music Awards ==
Year	Nominee / work	Award	Result	Ref.
1998	Themselves	Best International Group	Nominated	
1998	Billy Corgan	Best International Male	Nominated	
1998	Billy Corgan	Best International Personality	Nominated	
1998	"Ava Adore"	Best International Song	Nominated	
1998	"Ava Adore"	Best International Video	Nominated	
1999	Disintegration of Smashing Pumpkins	International Průser	Nominated	
2007	Themselves	Best International Group	Nominated	

== Hottest 100 of all time ==
In July Triple J Hottest 100 of All Time, 2009 the Smashing Pumpkins had 3 songs in Triple J Hottest 100 of all time, #35 "1979", #51 "Bullet With Butterfly Wings" and #78 "Today", voted by the Australian public.
