= Sending Hearts to All My Dearies: A Tribute to the Smashing Pumpkins =

2026 compilation album by various artists

Sending Hearts To All My Dearies: A Tribute To The Smashing Pumpkins

Compilation album by Various artists
- Released: August 14, 2026
- Label: Sumerian

Sending Hearts to All My Dearies: A Tribute to the Smashing Pumpkins is a tribute album to the American alternative rock band The Smashing Pumpkins. The album was announced by Sumerian Records in June 2026 and features artists from the alternative rock, rock, metal, synthwave, and indie music scenes performing covers of songs from the Smashing Pumpkins' catalogue.

== Background ==
The album was personally endorsed by Smashing Pumpkins frontman Billy Corgan, who also approved its title. The title is taken from a lyric in "Mayonaise", a song from the Smashing Pumpkins' 1993 album Siamese Dream.

The album was digitally released on August 14, 2026, while a deluxe double-vinyl edition is scheduled for October 16, 2026.

The first song released from the album was Tame Impala's cover of "Hummer", which also opens the album. Kevin Parker of Tame Impala said that Siamese Dream had been the soundtrack to his high-school years and that "Hummer" was the song from the album that most potently took him back to that period.

The album has been characterized as a cross-generational reinterpretation of the Smashing Pumpkins' material by artists influenced by the band's songwriting, experimentation, and emotional approach.

== Track listing ==
All tracks are written by Billy Corgan, except "Ava Adore" written by Corgan, Iha, Wretzky, and Chamberlin.

Sending Hearts to All My Dearies: A Tribute to the Smashing Pumpkins track listing
No.	Title	Performer	Length
1.	"Hummer"	Tame Impala	6:02
2.	"Today"	Yonaka	3:30
3.	"Tonight, Tonight"	The Midnight	4:10
4.	"Cherub Rock"	Carpenter Brut	4:56
5.	"1979"	Barns Courtney	5:42
6.	"Eye"	Meg Myers	4:11
7.	"Bullet with Butterfly Wings"	Palaye Royale	4:20
8.	"Jellybelly"	Between the Buried and Me	3:12
9.	"Drown"	Alice Glass	3:01
10.	"Tonight, Tonight"	Starbenders	4:24
11.	"1979"	Nita Strauss	4:19
12.	"Cherub Rock"	Bones UK	3:20
13.	"Thirty Three"	Moon Taxi	3:54
14.	"Bullet with Butterfly Wings"	Des Rocs	3:42
15.	"Ava Adore"	Urban Heat	3:26
Total length:			62:09
