= Eye (song) =

1997 single by The Smashing Pumpkins

Single by The Smashing Pumpkins

from the album Lost Highway Soundtrack
- Released: 1997
- Recorded: 1997
- Genre: Techno; alternative rock
- Length: 4:51
- Label: Nothing/Interscope
- Songwriter: Billy Corgan
- Producer: Billy Corgan

The Smashing Pumpkins singles chronology
| "Thirty-Three" (1996) | "Eye" (1997) | "The End Is the Beginning Is the End" (1997) |

"Eye" is a song by American alternative rock band The Smashing Pumpkins, released in 1997 on the soundtrack to the David Lynch film Lost Highway. Along with the song "The End Is the Beginning Is the End" from Batman & Robin and "Christmastime" from A Very Special Christmas 3, "Eye" represented a period of work on compilations done by the Pumpkins in between the release of the two albums Mellon Collie and the Infinite Sadness and Adore. It also appeared on their greatest hits collection Rotten Apples.

It was the band's first song released after the firing of drummer Jimmy Chamberlin the previous summer.

== Song history ==
In the aftermath of the quadruple-platinum Mellon Collie and the Infinite Sadness, Smashing Pumpkins’ lead singer Billy Corgan’s music publisher suggested he collaborate with basketball superstar and rapper Shaquille O'Neal, who had begun work on You Can't Stop the Reign. Corgan began work on a programmed backing track loosely inspired by Dr. Dre, but the collaboration fell through. Meanwhile, Lynch and Nine Inch Nails' Trent Reznor were assembling the soundtrack to Lynch's new film, Lost Highway. Lynch, who later would call Corgan a "magical musician", rejected Corgan's submission, "Tear", which would eventually be included on Adore. Corgan quickly finished off "Eye" and Lynch loved it, using it in a nightclub scene in the film.

An acoustic version of the song was performed in 1997 at the Bridge School Benefit concert. The performance featured Twiggy Ramirez and Marilyn Manson.

So far, "Eye" has been performed live by the band on their 1997, 2008, 2010, 2013, and 2016 tours, opting for a guitar-driven sound with live drums (by Matt Walker, Jimmy Chamberlin, and Mike Byrne, respectively) in lieu of a drum machine. It has also been played in their 2018 and 2019 tour with Jimmy Chamberlin.

== Reception ==
The song reached number eight on the US Modern Rock Tracks chart in 1997. Corgan later said the surprise success of "Eye" as a single inspired the band to continue with the new electronica-tinged direction as they began work on Adore.

== Charts ==
=== Weekly charts ===
| Chart (1997) | Peak position |
|---|---|
| Iceland (Íslenski Listinn Topp 40) | 6 |
| US Radio Songs (Billboard) | 49 |
| US Alternative Airplay (Billboard) | 8 |

=== Year-end charts ===
| Chart (1997) | Position |
|---|---|
| Iceland (Íslenski Listinn Topp 40) | 66 |
| US Modern Rock Tracks (Billboard) | 47 |

== Covers ==
Meg Myers covered the song for 2026's Sending Hearts To All My Dearies: A Tribute To The Smashing Pumpkins.
