= Muzzle (song) =

1996 promotional single by the Smashing Pumpkins

Single by the Smashing Pumpkins

from the album Mellon Collie and the Infinite Sadness
- Released: August 19, 1996
- Genre: Alternative rock, grunge
- Length: 3:44
- Label: Virgin
- Songwriter: Billy Corgan
- Producers: Alan Moulder, Billy Corgan, Flood

The Smashing Pumpkins singles chronology
"Tonight, Tonight" (1996)	"Muzzle" (1996)	"Thirty Three" (1996)

"Muzzle" is a song by American alternative rock band the Smashing Pumpkins from their third album, Mellon Collie and the Infinite Sadness. It was one of the last songs written by Billy Corgan for Mellon Collie, with the song's lyrics referring to what Corgan thought the public's perception was of him at the time. It was the fifth single from this album.

There was a rumor that a music video was filmed for "Muzzle" with drummer Jimmy Chamberlin, but was never released. Billy Corgan has, however, denied this. The band went on to perform "Muzzle" for their next television appearance on Late Night with Conan O'Brien with replacement drummer, Matt Walker.

During a live performance of "Muzzle" at Taste of Joliet, Corgan noted that the song is "about a Joliet girl."

== Chart performance ==
"Muzzle" reached number 10 on the US Mainstream Rock Tracks chart and number eight on the US Modern Rock Tracks chart. It reached number one on the alternative chart in Canada.

== Charts ==
=== Weekly charts ===
Chart (1996)	Peak position
Canada Top Singles (RPM)	33
Canada Rock/Alternative (RPM)	1
US Radio Songs (Billboard)	57
US Alternative Airplay (Billboard)	8
US Mainstream Rock (Billboard)	10

=== Year-end charts ===
Chart (1996)	Position
Canada Rock/Alternative (RPM)	15
US Mainstream Rock Tracks (Billboard)	86
US Modern Rock Tracks (Billboard)	69

== See also ==
- List of RPM Rock/Alternative number-one singles (Canada)
