= Clones (We're All) =

Song by Alice Cooper

- Single cover

Single by Alice Cooper

from the album Flush the Fashion
- B-side: "Model Citizen"
- Released: April 1980
- Recorded: February-March 1980
- Studio: Cherokee Studios (Los Angeles)
- Genre: New wave; electronic rock
- Length: 2:51
- Label: Warner Bros.
- Songwriter: David Carron
- Producer: Roy Thomas Baker

Alice Cooper singles chronology
"From the Inside" (1979)	"Clones (We're All)" (1980)	"Talk Talk" (1980)

Music video
- "Clones (We're All)" on YouTube

"Clones (We're All)" is song released as a single in 1980 by American rock singer Alice Cooper, taken from his fifth solo studio album, Flush the Fashion (1980).

== Background ==
The song is about forced conformity. Cooper reports that he wanted to do the song because he was looking for a new sound. The song was written by David Carron (1949–85), who had created the group Shenandoah, which went on to play with Arlo Guthrie, and the short-lived Gulliver (1978–79) with John Weider.

== Chart performance ==
The song peaked at No. 40 in the US Billboard charts, Cooper's first top 40 single in two years. Uncharacteristically for Cooper, it also charted on the Disco Top 100 in the US, peaking at No. 69.

Chart (1980)	Peak position
Australia (Kent Music Report)	36
Canada RPM Top Singles	25
Germany	58
US Billboard Hot 100	40
US Billboard Disco Top 100	69

== Appearances on albums ==
- Flush the Fashion (1980)
- A Fistful of Alice (1997)
- The Life and Crimes of Alice Cooper (1999)
- Mascara and Monsters: The Best of Alice Cooper (2001)
- School's Out and Other Hits (2004)

== Cover versions ==
The song has been covered by many artists, including:

- The Smashing Pumpkins, first released on the "Bullet with Butterfly Wings" maxi-CD in 1996
- Epoxies
- Penal Colony
- Mose Giganticus
- Bile
- The Wildbunch
