= Tonight, Tonight (The Smashing Pumpkins song) =

1996 single by the Smashing Pumpkins

- The single cover of "Tonight, Tonight" is credited to Billy Corgan.

Single by the Smashing Pumpkins

from the album Mellon Collie and the Infinite Sadness
- B-side: "Meladori Magpie"; "Rotten Apples"; "Jupiter's Lament"; "Medellia of the Gray Skies"; "Blank"; "Tonite Reprise"
- Released: May 6, 1996
- Genre: Alternative rock; art rock; orchestral pop
- Length: 4:14
- Label: Virgin, Hut
- Songwriter: Billy Corgan
- Producers: Flood; Alan Moulder; Billy Corgan

The Smashing Pumpkins singles chronology
"Zero" (1996)	"Tonight, Tonight" (1996)	"Muzzle" (1996)

"Tonight, Tonight" is a song by American alternative rock band the Smashing Pumpkins, written by the band's frontman, Billy Corgan. It is from their third album, Mellon Collie and the Infinite Sadness (1995), and was released as the album's fourth single on the May 6, 1996. The song was both written and produced by Corgan, who produced the track alongside Flood and Alan Moulder. The song is an alternative rock, art rock, and symphonic rock record.

"Tonight, Tonight" was critically acclaimed and commercially well-received upon its release, reaching number one in Iceland and the top 20 in Ireland, New Zealand, Scotland, and the United Kingdom. It was additionally certified Gold in the United Kingdom and Platinum in New Zealand. The music video accompanying the song was also successful and won several awards.

A shorter acoustic version of the song, "Tonite Reprise", was included as one of six B-sides to the single and on the original triple LP version of Mellon Collie. The single also later appeared in an extended form on the box set The Aeroplane Flies High (1996). Additionally, the song appears on the band's greatest hits release, Rotten Apples (2001), and its music video appeared on the DVD The Smashing Pumpkins – Greatest Hits Video Collection (1991–2000) (2001).

== Background and writing ==
Billy Corgan began writing for the follow-up to Siamese Dream after the tour in support of that album; however, the recording of "Tonight, Tonight" first began while the Pumpkins were still on the Siamese Dream tour when Corgan booked the band into a local Chicago studio to record all of their song ideas on tape.

On The Howard Stern Show, Corgan has said that the song pays homage to Cheap Trick, with its black humoresque lyrics and theme, and that the song is addressed to himself, who escaped from an abusive childhood against all odds, so as to keep him believing in himself.

== Composition and lyrics ==
"Tonight, Tonight" is written in the key of G, performed on instruments tuned down a half-step so the actual pitch is G♭/F #. In the original recording sessions, "Tonight, Tonight" was initially written in the key of C instead of G. However, since Corgan was unable to sing the song in C, he wrote a version during the Mellon Collie recording sessions to suit his range. The strings for the song were arranged by Billy Corgan and Audrey Riley, and recorded with the Chicago Symphony Orchestra. Corgan said that recording with a 30-piece string-section for the song "was probably one of the most exciting recording experiences I have ever had."

Lyrically, "Tonight, Tonight" hangs together with the rest of the Mellon Collie. The lyrics of the song have been compared to Robert Herrick's poem "To the Virgins, to Make Much of Time."

== Reception ==
"Tonight, Tonight"
A 25-second sample from "Tonight, Tonight".

"Tonight, Tonight" was met with critical acclaim. AllMusic reviewer Amy Hanson stated that the song "packs an emotional punch". Jim Alexander of NME regarded the song as "swirling [and] grand". Music Week rated it four out of five, adding, "A powerful vocals-led single with ferocious driving guitars. Their most commercial release to date which should gain a high chart placing." Time's reviewer Christopher John Farley called the song "an expansive rock anthem, complete with soaring guitars and a 30-piece string section." Entertainment Weekly's reviewer David Browne praised the use of strings in the song, saying that it was "whipped into a frenzy by hurricane-like strings". On Mellon Collie's entry in Rolling Stone's The 500 Greatest Albums of All Time, "Tonight, Tonight" was praised as "the Pumpkins at their finest."

While "Tonight, Tonight" never approached the chart success of "1979", it was among the most successful singles from Mellon Collie. Its highest position on any national chart was a number one peak in Iceland. Its highest position in the United States was at number four on Billboard Mainstream Rock Tracks. It also achieved number five on the Modern Rock Tracks and number 36 on the Billboard Hot 100. The song also charted at number 7 on the UK Singles Chart, and peaked at number 21 on the Australian Singles Chart on June 9, 1996. It is the band's highest-charting song in New Zealand and the UK. It placed at 50th in a list of best rock songs of all time broadcast by Kerrang! TV.

== Music video ==
A scene from the "Tonight, Tonight" music video

The music video, directed by Jonathan Dayton and Valerie Faris, starred Tom Kenny and Jill Talley, a married couple who were, at the time, cast members on the sketch comedy program Mr. Show with Bob and David. The original idea for the music video was for a Busby Berkeley-style video, complete with "people diving into champagne glasses". The band was set to begin production on the video when they discovered that the Red Hot Chili Peppers had done a similarly styled video for their song "Aeroplane", which was almost identical to what they had wanted to do. The second idea for the video was that as the band played on a surreal stage, the camera would go into audience members' eyes and the viewer would see that person's vision of the song. The third and final concept, inspired by Georges Méliès's silent film A Trip to the Moon, came from directors Dayton and Faris, whose inspiration for the video came from the album cover for Mellon Collie, which reminded them of early silent films. Hence, the video was filmed much like a turn-of-the-century silent film using theater-style backdrops and primitive special effects, with most of the backdrops and puppetwork created by artist Wayne White.

Dayton and the production crew initially had problems locating costumes for the video because the movie Titanic was being shot at the same time in Los Angeles. Titanic director James Cameron rented nearly every turn-of-the-century prop and costume in the city, leaving the "Tonight, Tonight" production crew little to work with. Dayton and Faris compromised by renting the leftover costumes and hiring designers to remake them into the elaborate period clothing seen in the video, which took three days to shoot.

The video, which debuted in May 1996, begins with a group of people celebrating the launch of a zeppelin to the moon. Kenny's character kisses Talley's character's hand as the two enter the zeppelin, which was being held to the ground by people dressed as sailors using rope. The zeppelin approaches the Moon, which has a face like the Moon's face in A Trip to the Moon. Shots of the band performing in similar, turn-of-the-century attire using older, acoustic instruments are interspersed. The two characters jump off the zeppelin and land onto the Moon's surface, slowing their descent using umbrellas. Suddenly, several hostile humanoid aliens appear, surrounding the couple. Kenny's character gets ready to defend them, but Talley's character intervenes and hits a few creatures with her umbrella, which vaporizes them, but the two are trapped and tied. The two form a plan, and then break free of the ropes and attack the aliens with their umbrellas. The couple escapes on a rocket similar to the one in A Trip to the Moon and land in the sea, where a merman resembling the sea-god Poseidon puts on a performance for them, including an octopus, singing mermaids, and starfish, before sending them back to the surface in a bubble. In the end, the ship "S.S. Méliès", named after the movie director, rescues the couple.

In addition to being heavily aired on MTV, the video received positive reviews and won several awards. Corgan remarked that "I don't think we've ever had people react [like this]...it just seemed to touch a nerve." It won six awards at the 1996 MTV Video Music Awards: Video of the Year, Breakthrough Video, Best Direction in a Video (Directors: Jonathan Dayton and Valerie Faris), Best Special Effects in a Video (Special Effects: Chris Staves), Best Art Direction in a Video (Art Director: K. K. Barrett and Wayne White) and Best Cinematography in a Video (Director of Photography: Declan Quinn). "Tonight, Tonight" was nominated for Best Editing in a Video (Editor: Eric Zumbrunnen) and Viewer's Choice, and was also nominated for Best Music Video, Short Form at the 39th Annual Grammy Awards. It is still considered one of the greatest music videos of all time, ranking number 40 on Stylus Magazine's list of the top 100 music videos of all time.

Though regular 6-string acoustic guitars and electric bass guitar was used in the original studio recording of the song, in the music video, befitting the turn-of-the-century theme, some interesting instruments were used as props: James Iha can be seen using a Gibson harp guitar and D'arcy Wretzky is seen playing an instrument that resembles the 1924 Gibson mandobass.

== Track listings ==
The Tonight, Tonight single was released with two different versions containing different b-sides, one as a standard single and the other as a CD included in the singles box set, The Aeroplane Flies High. All songs written by Billy Corgan.

- US single release
1. "Tonight, Tonight" – 4:15
2. "Meladori Magpie" – 2:41
3. "Rotten Apples" – 3:02
4. "Medellia of the Gray Skies" – 3:11
- The Aeroplane Flies High track listing
1. "Tonight, Tonight" – 4:15
2. "Meladori Magpie" – 2:41
3. "Rotten Apples" – 3:02
4. "Jupiter's Lament" – 2:30
5. "Medellia of the Gray Skies" – 3:11
6. "Blank" – 2:54
7. "Tonite Reprise" – 2:40

== Personnel ==
- Billy Corgan – vocals, guitar, producer, artwork
- James Iha – guitar on "Tonight, Tonight" and "Medellia of the Gray Skies"
- D'arcy Wretzky – bass on "Tonight, Tonight" and "Medellia of the Gray Skies"
- Jimmy Chamberlin – drums on "Tonight, Tonight"
- Dennis and Jimmy Flemion – instrumentation on "Medellia of the Gray Skies"
- Jeff Moleski – engineer
- Flood – producer of "Tonight, Tonight"
- Alan Moulder – producer of "Tonight, Tonight"
- Howie Weinberg – mastering
- Gustav Alsina – set design

== Charts ==
=== Weekly charts ===
Weekly chart performance for "Tonight, Tonight"
Chart (1996)	Peak position
Australia (ARIA)	21
Belgium (Ultratop 50 Flanders)	39
Canada Top Singles (RPM)	32
Canada Rock/Alternative (RPM)	2
Canada Hit Parade (The Record)	6
Canada Contemporary Hit Radio (The Record)	31
Europe (European Hit Radio)	25
Europe (Eurochart Hot 100)	22
European Alternative Rock Radio (Music & Media)	5
Iceland (Íslenski Listinn Topp 40)	1
Ireland (IRMA)	13
Netherlands (Dutch Top 40 Tipparade)	5
Netherlands (Single Top 100)	46
New Zealand (Recorded Music NZ)	2
Scottish Singles Sales (Official Charts)	5
Spain Airplay (Music & Media)	12
Sweden (Sverigetopplistan)	58
UK Singles (Music Monitor/ChartTrack)	5
UK Singles (Official Charts)	7
US Billboard Hot 100	36
US Adult Alternative Airplay (Billboard)	14
US Alternative Airplay (Billboard)	5
US Mainstream Rock (Billboard)	4
US Cash Box Top 100	25

=== Year-end charts ===
Year-end chart performance for "Tonight, Tonight"
Chart (1996)	Position
Canada Rock/Alternative (RPM)	28
Iceland (Íslenski Listinn Topp 40)	8
US Mainstream Rock Tracks (Billboard)	34
US Modern Rock Tracks (Billboard)	21

== Certifications ==
Certifications and sales for "Tonight, Tonight"
Region	Certification	Certified units/sales
New Zealand (RMNZ)	Platinum	30,000^{‡}
United Kingdom (BPI)	Gold	400,000^{‡}
^{‡} Sales+streaming figures based on certification alone.

== Release history ==
Release dates and formats for "Tonight, Tonight"
Region	Date	Format(s)	Label(s)	Ref.
United Kingdom	May 6, 1996	CD1; cassette	Virgin; Hut	
United Kingdom	May 13, 1996	CD2	Virgin; Hut	
United States	June 11, 1996	CD	Virgin	
United States	June 25, 1996	Contemporary hit radio	Virgin	
Japan	July 3, 1996	CD	Virgin	

== Cover versions ==
Band	Album	Year	Note
Passion Pit	Levi's Pioneer Sessions 2010 Revival Recordings	2010	Featured during the season 1, episode 3 of MTV's Teen Wolf (Pack Mentality. The cover plays near the end of the movie 10 Years.
Panic! at The Disco	Live in Denver	2005	Covered during their A Fever You Can't Sweat Out tour.
The Midnight	Sending Hearts To All My Dearies: A Tribute To The Smashing Pumpkins	2026	
Starbenders	Sending Hearts To All My Dearies: A Tribute To The Smashing Pumpkins	2026	
