= George A. Whiting =

- Born: George Edward Bernhamer; August 16, 1884
- Origin: Chicago, Illinois, United States
- Died: December 18, 1943 (aged 59) New York City, United States
- Occupations: Singer, lyricist
- Years active: 1909–1936

George A. Whiting was a vaudeville song and dance man, and also a writer of lyrics for popular songs during the vaudeville era. He toured with singer Sadie Burt, whom he later married and had 3 daughters with. His best-known work is "My Blue Heaven", with music by Walter Donaldson. Whiting was born in Chicago August 16, 1884 and died in New York City on December 18, 1943.
