= Zero (The Smashing Pumpkins song) =

1996 single by the Smashing Pumpkins

Single by the Smashing Pumpkins

from the album Mellon Collie and the Infinite Sadness
- Released: April 23, 1996
- Genre: Grunge
- Length: 2:41; 40:53 (EP)
- Label: Virgin
- Songwriter: Billy Corgan
- Producers: Flood; Alan Moulder; Billy Corgan

The Smashing Pumpkins singles chronology
"1979" (1996)	"Zero" (1996)	"Tonight, Tonight" (1996)

Official music video
- "Zero" on YouTube

"Zero" is a song by American alternative rock band the Smashing Pumpkins. It was released as the third single from their third studio album, Mellon Collie and the Infinite Sadness (1995). Written by Billy Corgan, it was the first song recorded for the album and features six rhythm guitars with two line-in 12-string acoustic guitars. The cover artwork and music video were created by Ukrainian photographer and Corgan's then-girlfriend Yelena Yemchuk.

Released on April 23, 1996, "Zero" reached No. 9 on the US Modern Rock Tracks chart and No. 1 on Canada's Alternative 30. The song was also released as an EP in the US and charted at No. 46 on the Billboard 200 instead of the Hot 100 due to the EP containing more than four songs, which was Billboard's limit for single releases. Similarly, in the United Kingdom, "Zero" reached No. 19 on the Scottish Albums Chart as a budget album. Elsewhere, the song peaked at No. 1 in Spain and No. 3 in New Zealand.

== Critical reception ==
"Zero" is considered one of the band's best songs, ranking in first place on Kerrang!'s list of their greatest songs.

== Music video ==
The music video was directed by Ukrainian photographer and Corgan's then-girlfriend Yelena Yemchuk, who also created the single's cover art. It takes place in a Roman-inspired mansion where the band members, dressed in black with gothic makeup, perform the song for rich guests (next to a portrait of President James K. Polk) who lounge around in masquerade attire while various freak shows happen throughout the mansion. Each time a band member is focused on, it is in the form of an extreme close-up with their face partially out of the frame as they stare expressionless into the camera. The video was described by NME as "very cinematic and creepy at times".

== B-sides ==
"Zero" was released as an EP and includes "Pastichio Medley", a medley of parts of songs from the Mellon Collie and the Infinite Sadness sessions that mostly remain unreleased. The medley runs nearly 23 minutes long and features 73 songs. The medley also features snippets of songs that actually were released; the snippet of the song "Disconnected" is a riff from an early version of "The Aeroplane Flies High (Turns Left, Looks Right)" (originally a B-side from the "Thirty-Three" single) and the riff called "Rachel" ended up being worked into the album track "X.Y.U." Eventually, 2012's reissue of Mellon Collie saw a number of tracks from the "Medley" released in full versions.

The instrumental track "Tribute to Johnny" pays homage to guitarist Johnny Winter.

== Track listing ==
=== EP ===
All tracks are written by Billy Corgan. Additional writers are noted.

Standard CD and cassette EP
No.	Title	Writer(s)	Length
1.	"Zero"		2:39
2.	"God"		3:09
3.	"Mouths of Babes"		3:46
4.	"Tribute to Johnny"	James Iha	2:34
5.	"Marquis in Spades"		3:17
6.	"Pennies"		2:28
7.	"Pastichio Medley" (length incorrectly printed as "25:59")	James Iha, D'arcy Wretzky, Jimmy Chamberlin	22:57

=== Pastichio Medley ===
"Pastichio Medley" is the last of the songs on the single/EP and is a medley of demos from Siamese Dream and Mellon Collie and the Infinite Sadness. The medley features 73 songs, listed below:

1. "The Demon" (0:00–0:10)
2. "Thunderbolt" (0:10–0:24)
3. "Dearth" (0:24–0:35)
4. "Knuckles" (0:35–0:52)
5. "Star Song" (0:52–1:15)
6. "Firepower" (1:15–1:28)
7. "New Waver" (1:28–1:41)
8. "Space Jam" (1:41–1:57)
9. "Zoom" (1:57–2:17)
10. "So Very Sad About Us" (2:17–2:27)
11. "Phang" (1/2) (2:27–2:37)
12. "Phang" (2/2) (2:37–2:47)
13. "Speed Racer" (2:47–3:02)
14. "The Eternal E" (3:02–3:17)
15. "Hairy Eyeball" (3:17–3:21)
16. "The Groover" (3:21–4:04)
17. "Hell Bent for Hell" (4:04–4:20)
18. "Rachel" (4:20–4:36)
19. "A Dog's Prayer" (1/2) (4:36–4:47)
20. "A Dog's Prayer" (2/2) (4:47–5:26)
21. "Blast" (5:26–5:48)
22. "The Black Rider" (5:48–5:59)
23. "Slurpee" (5:59–6:17)
24. "Flipper" (6:17–6:39)
25. "The Viper" (6:39–6:48)
26. "Bitch" (6:48–6:55)
27. "Fried" (6:55–7:06)
28. "Harmonio" (7:06–7:16)
29. "U.S.A." (7:16–7:24)
30. "The Tracer" (1/2) (7:24–7:36)
31. "Envelope Woman" (7:36–7:49)
32. "The Tracer" (2/2) (7:49–8:00)
33. "Plastic Guy" (8:00–8:09)
34. "Glasgow 3am" (8:09–8:17)
35. "The Road Is Long" (8:17–8:26)
36. "Funkified" (8:26–8:34)
37. "Rigamarole" (8:34–8:46)
38. "Depresso" (8:46–9:03)
39. "The Streets Are Hot Tonite" (9:03–9:15)
40. "Dawn at 16" (9:15–9:39)
41. "Spazmatazz" (9:39–9:49)
42. "Fucker" (9:49–9:59)
43. "In the Arms of Sheep" (9:59–10:16)
44. "Speed" (10:16–10:39)
45. "77" (10:39–10:50)
46. "Me Rock You Snow" (10:50–11:02)
47. "Feelium" (11:02–11:14)
48. "Is Alex Milton" (11:14–11:24)
49. "Rubberman" (11:24–11:35)
50. "Spacer" (11:35–11:42)
51. "Rock Me" (11:42–11:51)
52. "Weeping Willowly" (11:51–12:02)
53. "Rings" (12:02–12:17)
54. "So So Pretty" (12:17–12:29)
55. "Lucky Lad" (12:29–12:43)
56. "Jackboot" (12:43–12:57)
57. "Millieu" (12:57–13:06)
58. "Disconnected" (13:06–13:24)
59. "Let Your Lazer Love Light Shine Down" (13:24–13:33)
60. "Phreak" (13:33–13:37)
61. "Porkbelly" (13:37–13:49)
62. "Robot Lover" (13:49–13:58)
63. "Jimmy James" (13:58–14:05)
64. "America" (14:05–14:14)
65. "Slinkeepie" (14:14–14:33)
66. "Dummy Tum Tummy" (14:33–14:44)
67. "Fakir" (14:44–14:52)
68. "Jake" (14:52–15:03)
69. "Camaro" (15:03–15:18)
70. "Moonkids" (15:18–15:25)
71. "Make It Fungus" (15:25–15:35)
72. "V-8" (15:35–15:49)
73. "Die" (15:49–22:57)

== Charts ==
=== Weekly charts ===
Chart (1996)	Peak position
Canada Rock/Alternative (RPM)	1
New Zealand (Recorded Music NZ)	3
Spain (AFYVE)	1
Scottish Albums (Official Charts) Charted as a budget album	19
UK Rock & Metal Albums (Official Charts) Charted as a budget album	1
US Billboard 200 Charted as an EP	46
US Alternative Airplay (Billboard)	9
US Mainstream Rock (Billboard)	15

=== Year-end charts ===
Chart (1996)	Position
Canada Rock/Alternative (RPM)	23
US Mainstream Rock Tracks (Billboard)	62
US Modern Rock Tracks (Billboard)	43

== Certifications ==
Region	Certification	Certified units/sales
New Zealand (RMNZ)	Platinum	10,000^{*}
^{*} Sales figures based on certification alone.

== Release history ==
Region	Date	Format(s)	Label(s)	Ref.
United States	April 23, 1996	CD; cassette	Virgin	
Japan	August 7, 1996	CD	Virgin	
United Kingdom	August 19, 1996	CD	Virgin	

== In popular culture ==
The song and band members both appear in The Simpsons episode "Homerpalooza" (1996), which features one of the show's most famous jokes, with Corgan introducing himself to Homer as "Billy Corgan, Smashing Pumpkins" and the clueless Homer replying "Homer Simpson, smiling politely".
