= Bullet with Butterfly Wings =

1995 single by the Smashing Pumpkins

Single by the Smashing Pumpkins

from the album Mellon Collie and the Infinite Sadness
- B-side: "...Said Sadly"; "You're All I've Got Tonight"; "Clones (We're All)"; "A Night Like This"; "Destination Unknown"; "Dreaming"
- Released: October 16, 1995
- Genre: Grunge; alternative rock; alternative metal
- Length: 4:16
- Label: Virgin
- Songwriter: Billy Corgan
- Producers: Flood; Alan Moulder; Billy Corgan

The Smashing Pumpkins singles chronology
"Rocket" (1994)	"Bullet with Butterfly Wings" (1995)	"1979" (1996)

Music video
- Bullet with Butterfly Wings on YouTube

Audio sample
- file; help

"Bullet with Butterfly Wings" is a song by the American alternative rock band the Smashing Pumpkins. It was released as the lead single from their 1995 double album Mellon Collie and the Infinite Sadness, and is the sixth track on the first disc. This song was the band's first top-40 US hit, peaking at number 22 on the Billboard Hot 100. It also spent six weeks at number two on the Billboard Modern Rock Tracks chart and peaked at number four on the Billboard Album Rock Tracks chart. In Canada, the song peaked at number 18 on the RPM Top Singles chart and spent four weeks at number one on the RPM Alternative 30 chart, becoming Canada's most successful rock song of 1995. It also reached number one in Iceland for a week.

The song won the Grammy Award for Best Hard Rock Performance in 1997. It was named the 91st best hard rock song of all time by VH1 in 2009 and ranked number 70 on the 2008 list of "The 100 Greatest Guitar Songs of All Time" of Rolling Stone. The song came second in the Triple J Hottest 100, 1995, was later voted number 51 in the Triple J Hottest 100 of All Time, 2009 and placed at number 25 in the Triple J Hottest 100 of the Past 20 Years, 2013.

== Background ==
The song had its origins during the recording of 1993's Siamese Dream. According to frontman Billy Corgan, "I have a tape of us from 1993 endlessly playing the 'world is a vampire' part over and over". Corgan wrote the noted chorus "rat in a cage" on an acoustic guitar during the same session that "Landslide" was recorded.

The lyric "Can you fake it, for just one more show?" may refer to the band's experience headlining the 1994 Lollapalooza festival, with Corgan calling it "old Job". As with other songs on Mellon Collie and the Infinite Sadness, Corgan appears to compare himself to Jesus, with the line "Tell me I'm the chosen one / Jesus was an only son".

== Critical reception ==
"Bullet with Butterfly Wings" is widely considered one of the Smashing Pumpkins' best songs. Louder Sound and Kerrang! both ranked the song number three on their lists of the greatest Smashing Pumpkins songs.

The New York Times noted of a 2014 concert by the band that "one chorus always gets the Smashing Pumpkins' fans shouting along", identifying the line as: "Despite all my rage, I am still just a rat in a cage".

== Music video ==
Filming for the music video took place in late September 1995 with Samuel Bayer as director. The filming location was a quarry located in the Simi Valley hills of California, most likely the mining pits of the Gillibrand Industrial Sands facility, located adjacent to the Big Sky Film Ranch The visual look of the video was inspired by the work of Brazilian photographer Sebastião Salgado on gold mining; in contrast, the band used the video to debut their new glam rock wardrobes - notably, Billy Corgan's black shirt with the word "Zero" written in silver, and silver pants. The video also marks the last filmed appearance of Billy Corgan prior to his decision to shave his head.

When asked why the band chose Bullet for the first video, Corgan responded "the record company did a survey of K-Mart shoppers between 30 and 40 and this is the song they came up with". Chamberlin added that "this is the blue light special"; both of these statements were most likely sarcastic.

== Track listings ==
Original US and UK CD single

No.	Title	Writer(s)	Length
1.	"Bullet with Butterfly Wings"	Billy Corgan	4:16
2.	"...Said Sadly"	James Iha	3:09

"...Said Sadly" features Nina Gordon of Veruca Salt on vocals.

1996 Re-issue

No.	Title	Writer(s)	Length
1.	"Bullet with Butterfly Wings"	Billy Corgan	4:16
2.	"...Said Sadly"	James Iha	3:09
3.	"You're All I've Got Tonight"	Ric Ocasek	3:10
4.	"Clones (We're All)"	David Carron	2:43
5.	"A Night Like This"	Robert Smith	3:36
6.	"Destination Unknown"	Dale Bozzio/Terry Bozzio/Warren Cuccurullo	4:14
7.	"Dreaming"	Debbie Harry, Chris Stein	5:11

US 7-inch double A-side single

No.	Title	Writer(s)	Length
1.	"1979"	Billy Corgan	4:24
2.	"Bullet with Butterfly Wings"	Billy Corgan	4:16

== Charts ==
=== Weekly charts ===
Chart (1995–1996)	Peak position
Australia (ARIA)	33
Canada Retail Singles (The Record)	6
Canada Top Singles (RPM)	18
Canada Rock/Alternative (RPM)	1
Europe (Eurochart Hot 100)	66
European Alternative Rock (Music & Media)	11
France (SNEP)	17
Iceland (Íslenski Listinn Topp 40)	1
Ireland (IRMA)	18
Netherlands (Single Top 100 Tipparade)	9
New Zealand (Recorded Music NZ)	41
Scottish Singles Sales (Official Charts)	21
UK Singles (Official Charts)	20
US Billboard Hot 100	22
US Alternative Airplay (Billboard)	2
US Mainstream Rock (Billboard)	4
US Cash Box Top 100	27

=== Year-end charts ===
Chart (1995)	Position
Canada Rock/Alternative (RPM)	1

Chart (1996)	Position
Canada Rock/Alternative (RPM)	32
Iceland (Íslenski Listinn Topp 40)	75
US Mainstream Rock Tracks (Billboard)	31
US Modern Rock Tracks (Billboard)	50

== Certifications ==
Region	Certification	Certified units/sales
New Zealand (RMNZ)	Platinum	30,000^{‡}
United Kingdom (BPI)	Gold	400,000^{‡}
United States (RIAA)	Gold	500,000^{^}
^{^} Shipments figures based on certification alone.^{‡} Sales+streaming figures based on certification alone.

== Release history ==
Region	Date	Format(s)	Label(s)	Ref.
United States	October 2, 1995	Rock radio	Virgin	
United States	October 10, 1995	Contemporary hit radio	Virgin	
United Kingdom	October 16, 1995	CD; cassette	Hut	
Australia	October 23, 1995	CD; cassette	Virgin	

== Cover versions ==
- Hawthorne Heights made a cover of this song, released as part of a 2007 Smashing Pumpkins tribute album from MySpace Records.
- MØ made a cover of this song; this version was released as a one-off single in 2019.
- My Chemical Romance performed a cover of the song at Oracle Park as a part of their Long Live The Black Parade tour.
- Both Palaye Royale and Des Rocs covered the song for 2026's Sending Hearts To All My Dearies: A Tribute To The Smashing Pumpkins.

== In other media ==
The song is used, slightly edited, as the title song for the Animal Planet reality television series Whale Wars, which follows the Sea Shepherd Conservation Society as they chase Japanese whalers in the Southern Ocean Whale Sanctuary. The song is also used in the South Park episode "Whale Whores", which parodies Whale Wars.

"Weird Al" Yankovic performed the chorus in "The Alternative Polka" from his Bad Hair Day album.

The song was featured as a playable track in the video game Guitar Hero 5.

It was also used in the launch trailer for Dead Space 2.

The song was the TNA Lockdown wrestling pay-per-view theme song for 2009.

Parts of the song were used in the exposition of the 2022 film Black Adam.

A stripped-down remix by A.P. Laurenson was uploaded in 2016, which had gone viral and later served as the basis for various trailers, including Rampage in 2018, Call of Duty: Modern Warfare II in 2022, and The Last Voyage of the Demeter in 2023. In 2025, the song was used in a live-action trailer for Battlefield 6, in a style similar to the Call of Duty: Modern Warfare II trailer.
