= Thirty-Three (song) =

1996 single by the Smashing Pumpkins

Single by the Smashing Pumpkins

from the album Mellon Collie and the Infinite Sadness
- B-side: "The Last Song"; "The Aeroplane Flies High (Turns Left, Looks Right)"; "Transformer"; "The Bells"; "My Blue Heaven"
- Released: November 11, 1996
- Genre: Alternative rock; psychedelic rock; country
- Length: 4:10
- Label: Virgin; Hut
- Songwriter: Billy Corgan
- Producers: Flood; Alan Moulder; Billy Corgan

The Smashing Pumpkins singles chronology
| "Muzzle" (1996) | "Thirty-Three" (1996) | "Eye" (1997) |

Alternative cover
- UK CD single 2

"Thirty-Three" is a song by American alternative rock band the Smashing Pumpkins. It was the sixth and final single from their third album, Mellon Collie and the Infinite Sadness (1995), in November 1996. It was the first single released after the firing of Jimmy Chamberlin and death of Jonathan Melvoin. The song peaked at 39 on the US Billboard Hot 100, reached number seven in New Zealand, and entered the top 30 in Canada and the United Kingdom. In Canada, it coincidentally finished at number 33 on the RPM Alternative 30 year-end chart for 1997.

== Background ==
The song was described by Billy Corgan as "a simple song in a country tuning", and was the first song that he wrote after the Siamese Dream tour. The guitars in the song are tuned to EGBGBE half a step down, and the drum machine track is exactly the same track Corgan recorded when he laid down the demo version of the song, because he was unable to recreate it.

In a taping of VH1 Storytellers on August 24, 2000, Corgan joked that he planned on making "Thirty-Three", "Sixty-Six", and "Ninety-Nine", but only finished "Thirty-Three". Regarding the song's origin, Corgan stated:

When I wrote that song I was just moving into my house, I had just gotten married, and in some ways the song talks about me entering a new phase in my life. But it also talks about how I don't really necessarily trust that part of my life. Obviously it has more relevance now that I'm divorced and I'm out of my house. ... So the song has a different poignancy for me now, both because I foreshadowed the future and I was also hopeful that that sort of future was going to work out.

When the band released their greatest hits collection in 2001, "Thirty-Three" made neither the international nor the US version. It was included, however, on the Greatest Hits Video Collection.

== Music video ==
The music video for "Thirty-Three", directed both by Billy Corgan and then-girlfriend Yelena Yemchuk, is a series of images shot in stop-motion, ending with a re-enactment of the Mellon Collie album cover. Released in late 1996, Jimmy Chamberlin is notably absent from the shoot, as he was removed from the band in July. Although the group's videos habitually avoid the literal interpretation of a song's lyrics, the video for "Thirty-Three" was created with images closely related to the words of the song, as an intentional stylistic departure.

== B-sides ==
The B-side "The Last Song" features a guitar solo by Corgan's father, Billy Corgan Sr. and was performed live only once, at the Pumpkins' final show at Chicago's Cabaret Metro.

The B-side "My Blue Heaven" features piano by Keith Brown, a song written in 1927 by George A. Whiting and Walter Donaldson.

Adam Schlesinger of Fountains of Wayne and Ivy fame contributed piano for the B-side "The Bells".

== Track listings ==
US and UK maxi-CD singles
| No. | Title | Writer(s) | Length |
|---|---|---|---|
| 1. | "Thirty Three" | Billy Corgan | 4:09 |
| 2. | ""The Last Song"" | Billy Corgan | 3:55 |
| 3. | "The Aeroplane Flies High (Turns Left, Looks Right)" | Billy Corgan | 8:31 |
| 4. | "Transformer" | Billy Corgan | 3:25 |

UK CD single CD2
| No. | Title | Writer(s) | Length |
|---|---|---|---|
| 1. | "Thirty Three" | Billy Corgan | 4:09 |
| 2. | "The Bells" | James Iha | 2:17 |
| 3. | "My Blue Heaven" | George Whiting/Walter Donaldson | 3:20 |

== Charts ==
=== Weekly charts ===
Weekly chart performance for "Thirty-Three"
| Chart (1996–1997) | Peak position |
|---|---|
| Australia (ARIA) | 51 |
| Canada Top Singles (RPM) | 24 |
| Canada Rock/Alternative (RPM) | 2 |
| Canada Contemporary Hit Radio (The Record) | 22 |
| Netherlands (Single Top 100 Tipparade) | 16 |
| New Zealand (Recorded Music NZ) | 7 |
| Scottish Singles Sales (Official Charts) | 26 |
| UK Singles (Official Charts) | 21 |
| UK Rock & Metal (Official Charts) | 1 |
| US Billboard Hot 100 | 39 |
| US Adult Alternative Airplay (Billboard) | 14 |
| US Alternative Airplay (Billboard) | 2 |
| US Mainstream Rock (Billboard) | 18 |

=== Year-end charts ===
Year-end chart performance for "Thirty-Three"
| Chart (1997) | Position |
|---|---|
| Canada Rock/Alternative (RPM) | 33 |
| US Mainstream Rock Tracks (Billboard) | 99 |
| US Modern Rock Tracks (Billboard) | 22 |

== Release history ==
Release dates and formats for "Thirty-Three"
| Region | Date | Format(s) | Label(s) | Ref. |
|---|---|---|---|---|
| United Kingdom | November 11, 1996 | CD | Virgin; Hut | |
| United States | November 12, 1996 | CD | Virgin | |
| United States | November 19, 1996 | Contemporary hit radio | Virgin | |
| Japan | January 16, 1997 | CD | Virgin | |
