= 1979 (song) =

1996 single by the Smashing Pumpkins

Single by the Smashing Pumpkins

from the album Mellon Collie and the Infinite Sadness
- B-side: "Ugly"; "The Boy"; "Cherry"; "Believe"; "Set the Ray to Jerry"
- Released: January 23, 1996
- Genre: Alternative rock; art rock; synth-pop
- Length: 4:24 (album, single, video version); 4:16 (radio edit)
- Label: Virgin; Hut
- Songwriter: Billy Corgan
- Producers: Flood; Alan Moulder; Billy Corgan

The Smashing Pumpkins singles chronology
"Bullet with Butterfly Wings" (1995)	"1979" (1996)	"Zero" (1996)

Audio sample
- file; help

Music video
- "1979" on YouTube

"1979" is a song by American alternative rock band the Smashing Pumpkins. It was released on January 23, 1996, as the second single from their third studio album, Mellon Collie and the Infinite Sadness (1995). "1979" was written by frontman Billy Corgan, and features loops and samples uncharacteristic of previous Smashing Pumpkins songs. The song foreshadows the synth-pop sound the band would embrace more openly on Adore and its singles "Ava Adore" and "Perfect". The song was written as a nostalgic coming-of-age story by Corgan, reflecting on what he considered his transition into adolescence in 1979, when he turned twelve years old.

"1979" reached number two in Canada and Iceland, number six in Ireland, number nine in New Zealand, and number 12 in the United States. It charted within the top 20 in several other countries, including Australia and the United Kingdom. The song was nominated for the Record of the Year and Best Rock Performance by a Duo or Group with Vocal at the 39th Annual Grammy Awards, and won an MTV Video Music Award for Best Alternative Video. In 2012, it was voted the second-best Smashing Pumpkins song by Rolling Stone readers.

== Recording ==
According to statements in interviews, Corgan worked nonstop after the Siamese Dream tour, and wrote about 56 songs for Mellon Collie and the Infinite Sadness, the last of which was "1979".

The song that would become "1979" evolved out of a demo called "Strolling". As the Mellon Collie sessions came to a conclusion, this song was just a couple of chord changes and a snippet of a melody without words. When the time came to choose the songs that were to appear on the album, producer Flood said that the song was "not good enough" and wanted to drop it from the record. Inspired, Corgan took this as a challenge, and he wrote "1979" that night in about four hours. The next day, Flood heard the song once and decided immediately to put it on the album. Corgan considers "1979" the most personally important song on Mellon Collie.

The song features a sample of Corgan's voice repeated throughout. During recording, Corgan was singing "today" as the melody line, so he and Flood decided to record him singing to a tape. The pair electronically manipulated several samples and looped them against a drumbeat. "1979" is partly influenced by "Pleasure", an unreleased song by the Frogs, whom Corgan had liked after seeing them perform in Madison, WI, in 1993. Corgan later performed during the band's encore at Lollapalooza in the summer of 1994, and Dennis Flemion of the Frogs would replace recently deceased keyboard player Jonathan Melvoin during the Infinite Sadness tour.

== Reception ==
"1979" is the Smashing Pumpkins' highest-charting single, reaching number 12 on the Billboard Hot 100 and number one on the Mainstream Rock Tracks and on the Modern Rock Tracks charts. Virgin credited the inclusion of the single's bonus tracks for driving sales. The song was nominated for the Record of the Year and Best Rock Performance by a Duo or Group with Vocal at the 1997 Grammy Awards. Pitchfork included the song at number 21 on their "Top 200 Tracks of the 90s" and said "'1979' was Billy Corgan asking, 'You know this feeling?' and the second you heard that guitar line the immediate answer was, 'I do—tell me more.'"

In a 1996 Spin interview, Corgan indicated that "1979" was probably the only indication he had for what the next Pumpkins album would sound like, "something that combines technology, and a rock sensibility, and pop, and whatever, and hopefully clicks. Between 'Bullet with Butterfly Wings' and '1979' you have the bookends of Mellon Collie and the Infinite Sadness. You've literally [heard] the end of the rock thing, and the beginning of the new thing".

In Australia, the song was voted number 13 on Triple J Hottest 100 in 1996. It was later voted number 71 on the Hottest 100 of All Time in 1998, number 35 on the Triple J Hottest 100 of All Time in 2009, and number 21 on the Hottest 100 of the Past 20 Years in 2013.

== Music video ==
The music video for "1979" was directed by the team of Jonathan Dayton and Valerie Faris, who had previously directed the music video for "Rocket". Originally, the band approached another director (possibly Spike Jonze) to film the video for "1979". The original idea was that all the band members were residents in an alien hotel and they were all going to have specially made alien-elephant masks. This concept would have cost over US$1 million to film, and was not produced.

The video follows a day in the life of disaffected suburban teenagers driving around in a 1972 Dodge Charger. It is based on a concept Corgan created, featuring an idealized version of teenage life, while also trying to capture the feeling of being bored in the Chicago suburbs, where Corgan grew up. In the video the Dodge Charger has Illinois license plates, although in the driving scenes the mountains of California are visible in the background shots. Originally, Corgan wanted a scene of violence, in which the convenience store was trashed by the teens at the end of the video, but Dayton and Faris convinced him to go for something tamer. Corgan appears throughout the video in the backseat of a car, and the other band members have small parts in the video; James Iha appears as a convenience store clerk, D'arcy Wretzky as an irate neighbor, Jimmy Chamberlin as a policeman, and the band also appears in the party scene. Band manager "Gooch" plays Jimmy's partner.

Upon finishing the video shoot, the band flew to New York to perform. However, all tapes of the footage were accidentally left sitting on top of a car, and were lost as the driver departed. The group later flew back to re-shoot the party scene.

The "1979" video was highly acclaimed. It won the MTV Video Music Award for Best Alternative Video in 1996. It was one of Canadian cable television music channel MuchMusic's Countdown number-one videos of 1996. Billy Corgan considers it the Pumpkins' best video, calling it "the closest we've ever come to realizing everything we wanted."

The video for the 1998 song "Perfect" is a sequel to the video for "1979", and involves the same characters who are now older. The incident with the loss of the original footage is parodied in one of the later video's final scenes, in which a cassette tape is left on top of a car and falls off as a character drives out of a parking lot at high speed, and is subsequently destroyed by a police vehicle.

== Track listings ==
UK and US CD single, UK 12-inch vinyl

No.	Title	Writer(s)	Length
1.	"1979"	Billy Corgan	4:24
2.	"Ugly"	Billy Corgan	2:28
3.	"Believe"	James Iha	3:15
4.	"Cherry"	Billy Corgan	4:02

1996 maxi-CD re-issue

No.	Title	Writer(s)	Length
1.	"1979"	Billy Corgan	4:24
2.	"Ugly"	Billy Corgan	2:28
3.	"The Boy"	James Iha	3:04
4.	"Cherry"	Billy Corgan	4:02
5.	"Believe"	James Iha	3:15
6.	"Set the Ray to Jerry"	Billy Corgan	4:10

US 7-inch double A-side single

No.	Title	Writer(s)	Length
1.	"1979"	Billy Corgan	4:24
2.	"Bullet with Butterfly Wings"	Billy Corgan	4:16

1979 Mixes

No.	Title	Writer(s)	Length
1.	"1979" (Vocal Mix)	Billy Corgan	5:08
2.	"1979" (Instrumental Mix)	Billy Corgan	5:17
3.	"1979" (Moby Mix)	Billy Corgan	6:39
4.	"1979" (Cement Mix)	Billy Corgan	4:40

Tracks 1, 2, and 4 are remixed by Roli Mosimann. Track 3 is remixed by Moby.

== Charts ==
=== Weekly charts ===
Chart (1996)	Peak position
Australia (ARIA)	16
Belgium (Ultratop 50 Flanders)	37
Belgium (Ultratop 50 Wallonia)	21
Canada Top Singles (RPM)	2
Canada Dance/Urban (RPM)	7
Canada Rock/Alternative (RPM)	3
Canada Retail Singles (The Record)	8
Canada Hit Parade (The Record)	5
Canada Contemporary Hit Radio (The Record)	2
Estonia (Eesti Top 20)	6
Europe (Eurochart Hot 100)	44
European Alternative Rock (Music & Media)	4
European Hit Radio Top 40 (Music & Media)	26
Finland (Suomen virallinen lista)	11
France (SNEP)	38
France Airplay (Music & Media)	10
Iceland (Íslenski Listinn Topp 40)	2
Ireland (IRMA)	6
Latvia (Latvijas Top 40)	18
Netherlands (Dutch Top 40)	38
Netherlands (Single Top 100)	29
New Zealand (Recorded Music NZ)	9
Poland Airplay (Music & Media)	9
Quebec Airplay (ADISQ)	3
Scottish Singles Sales (Official Charts)	17
Spain Airplay (Music & Media)	12
UK Singles (Official Charts)	16
US Billboard Hot 100	12
US Adult Alternative Airplay (Billboard)	3
US Adult Pop Airplay (Billboard)	30
US Alternative Airplay (Billboard)	1
US Dance Club Songs (Billboard)	17
US Dance Singles Sales (Billboard)	47
US Mainstream Rock Airplay (Billboard)	1
US Pop Airplay (Billboard)	10
US Cash Box Top 100	11

=== Year-end charts ===
Chart (1996)	Position
Australia (ARIA)	94
Belgium (Ultratop 50 Wallonia)	77
Canada Top Singles (RPM)	15
Canada Dance/Urban (RPM)	35
Canada Rock/Alternative (RPM)	3
Iceland (Íslenski Listinn Topp 40)	34
US Billboard Hot 100	44
US Mainstream Rock (Billboard)	10
US Top 40/Mainstream (Billboard)	30

== Certifications ==
Region	Certification	Certified units/sales
Italy (FIMI)	Gold	25,000^{‡}
New Zealand (RMNZ)	4× Platinum	120,000^{‡}
Spain (Promusicae)	Gold	30,000^{‡}
United Kingdom (BPI)	Platinum	600,000^{‡}
United States (RIAA)	Gold	500,000^{^}
^{^} Shipments figures based on certification alone.^{‡} Sales+streaming figures based on certification alone.

== Personnel ==
- Billy Corgan - vocals, guitars, drum machine, synthesizers
- James Iha - guitar, backing vocals
- D'arcy Wretzky - bass guitar, backing vocals
- Jimmy Chamberlin - drums

== Release history ==
Region	Date	Format(s)	Label(s)	Ref.
United States	January 23, 1996	CD	Virgin	
United Kingdom	January 29, 1996	12-inch vinyl; CD; cassette	Virgin; Hut	
United Kingdom	March 11, 1996	12-inch vinyl; CD (Mixes)	Virgin; Hut	

== Licensed uses ==
The song appears in the film Clerks II (2006) and during the credits of the video game Gran Turismo 5 (2010). It was also released as part of a Smashing Pumpkins-themed DLC pack for the rhythm game Guitar Hero World Tour. It was also part of the soundtrack of Grand Theft Auto IV, playing on the fictional Liberty Rock Radio station until it was removed in an April 2018 update when Rockstar Games' ten-year license to the song expired. The song's guitar riff was also interpolated by American boy band Why Don't We in their song "Slow Down".

== Covers ==
Both Barns Courtney and Nita Strauss covered the song for 2026's Sending Hearts To All My Dearies: A Tribute To The Smashing Pumpkins.

American progressive metal band The Contortionist covered the song on their 2019 EP Our Bones.

== See also ==
- Number one modern rock hits of 1996
- List of number-one mainstream rock hits (United States)
- List of RPM Rock/Alternative number-one singles (Canada)
