= Mellon Collie and the Infinite Sadness =

1995 studio album by The Smashing Pumpkins

Studio album by the Smashing Pumpkins
- Released: October 23, 1995
- Recorded: March–August 1995
- Studios: Pumpkinland, Chicago; Sadlands & Bugg, Chicago; CRC, Chicago; Village Recorder, Los Angeles
- Genres: Alternative rock; grunge; alternative metal; art rock; heavy metal
- Length: 121:39 (CD, cassette, and 2012 remastered vinyl); 128:06 (original vinyl pressing)
- Label: Virgin
- Producers: Alan Moulder; Billy Corgan; Flood

The Smashing Pumpkins chronology
Vieuphoria (1994)	Mellon Collie and the Infinite Sadness (1995)	The Aeroplane Flies High (1996)

Singles from Mellon Collie and the Infinite Sadness
- 1. "Bullet with Butterfly Wings" Released: October 16, 1995; 2. "1979" Released: January 23, 1996; 3. "Zero" Released: April 23, 1996 (US); 4. "Tonight, Tonight" Released: May 6, 1996 (UK); 5. "Muzzle" Released: August 19, 1996; 6. "Thirty-Three" Released: November 11, 1996

Alternate cover
- 2012 deluxe version cover

Mellon Collie and the Infinite Sadness is the third studio album by the American alternative rock band the Smashing Pumpkins, released on October 23, 1995 by Virgin Records. It was produced by the singer and guitarist Billy Corgan, alongside the producers Flood and Alan Moulder. The 28-track album was released as a two-disc CD, a double Cassette, a double Minidisc, and a triple LP. It features a wide array of musical styles, including art rock, grunge, alternative rock, and heavy metal. Propelled by its lead single "Bullet with Butterfly Wings", the album debuted at number one on the US Billboard 200 with first-week sales of 246,500 units. It remains the band's only album to top the Billboard 200.

It spawned five more singles—"1979", "Zero", "Tonight, Tonight", "Muzzle" and "Thirty-Three"—over the course of 1996, and was certified diamond by the Recording Industry Association of America (RIAA), signifying over ten million units sold in the US. Recording sessions saw a wealth of productivity: dozens of fully completed songs were cut from the album and resurfaced on later releases. A box set released in November 1996 titled The Aeroplane Flies High compiled its promotional singles and around 30 fully completed songs from the Mellon Collie sessions that had not made the final cut (including "Pastichio Medley", a pastiche or medley of about 70 short pieces). Both albums were reissued years later with even more session tracks.

Lauded by critics for its ambition and scope, Mellon Collie and the Infinite Sadness earned the band seven Grammy Award nominations in 1997, including Album of the Year and Record of the Year ("1979"), as well as nine MTV Music Video Awards nominations, eight of which were for "Tonight, Tonight", including Video of the Year. The singles became hits on mainstream rock and modern rock stations, and "Bullet with Butterfly Wings", "1979", "Tonight, Tonight" and "Thirty-Three" became the band's first Top 40 hits, crossing over to pop radio stations. It has since been regarded as one of the greatest albums of the 1990s and of all time.

== Background and production ==
After the 13-month tour in support of the Smashing Pumpkins' second album Siamese Dream (1993), Billy Corgan immediately began writing songs for the band's next record. From the outset, the band intended the new record to be a double album, partly inspired by the Beatles' self-titled album. Corgan said, "We almost had enough material to make Siamese Dream a double album. With this new album, I really liked the notion that we would create a wider scope in which to put other kinds of material we were writing." Corgan felt that the band's musical approach was running its course, and wanted the band to approach the album as if it were its last. Corgan described the album at the time to the music press as "The Wall for Generation X", a comparison with Pink Floyd's 1979 album, one of the highest-selling and best-known concept albums of all time.

The band decided against working with Butch Vig, who had produced the group's previous albums, and selected Flood and Alan Moulder as coproducers. Corgan explained, "To be completely honest, I think it was a situation where we'd become so close to Butch that it started to work to our disadvantage... I just felt we had to force the situation, sonically, and take ourselves out of normal Pumpkin recording mode. I didn't want to repeat past Pumpkin work."

Flood immediately pushed the band to change its recording practices. Corgan later said, "Flood felt like the band he would see live wasn't really captured on record". In April 1995, the band began recording in a rehearsal space instead of entering the studio straight away. At these sessions, the band recorded rough rhythm tracks with Flood. Although originally designed to create a rough draft for the record, the rehearsal-space sessions yielded much of the new album's rhythm-section parts. Flood also insisted that the band set aside time each day devoted to jamming or songwriting, practices in which the band had never before engaged during recording sessions. Corgan said, "Working like that kept the whole process very interesting—kept it from becoming a grind."

Corgan sought to eliminate the tension, long hours, and emotional strain that permeated the Siamese Dream recording sessions, about which he said, "[T]o me, the biggest offender was the insidious amounts of time that everyone spends waiting for guitar parts to be overdubbed. There were literally weeks where no one had anything to do but sit and wait." The band countered idleness by using two recording rooms at the same time. This tactic allowed Corgan to develop vocals and song arrangements in one room while recording occurred in the other. During these sessions, Flood and Corgan would work in one room as Moulder, guitarist James Iha and bassist D'arcy Wretzky worked in a second. Iha and Wretzky had much greater roles in the recording sessions of Mellon Collie compared to previous albums. This was, in large part, to counter rumours from the Siamese Dream sessions that Corgan was recording all of the bass and guitar parts by himself. Iha commented about how the recording sessions for Mellon Collie improved from that of Siamese Dream, noting:

The big change is that Billy is not being the big 'I do this—I do that'. It's much better. The band arranged a lot of songs for this record, and the song writing process was organic. The circumstances of the last record and the way that we worked was really bad.

Following the rehearsal-space sessions, the band recorded overdubs at the Chicago Recording Company. Pro Tools was used for recording guitar overdubs as well as for post-production electronic looping and sampling. Wretzky also recorded numerous backup vocal parts, but all were cut except that which was recorded for "Beautiful". When the recording sessions concluded, the band had 57 potential songs for inclusion on Mellon Collie. The album was originally planned to have 31 songs, but the count was reduced to 28.

== Composition ==
"Tonight, Tonight"
The Smashing Pumpkins would use violins and cellos for some of their songs and "Tonight, Tonight" would be one of their most famous for using this style.

"1979"
Sample of "1979", the second single from Mellon Collie and the Infinite Sadness (1995). The band's biggest hit and a precursor to their change in style, featuring a drum machine accompaniment to Chamberlin's drums and sampled vocal effects.

The songs on Mellon Collie and the Infinite Sadness are intended to work together conceptually, with the two halves of the album representing day and night. Despite this, Corgan has rejected the term concept album to describe it, and it was at the time described as more "loose" and "vague" than were the band's previous records. He also said it is based on "the human condition of mortal sorrow". Corgan aimed the album's message at people between 14 and 24 years of age, hoping "to sum up all the things I felt as a youth but was never able to voice articulately. ... I'm waving goodbye to me in the rear view mirror, tying a knot around my youth and putting it under the bed."

Musically, the album has been described as featuring alternative rock, grunge, alternative metal, art rock and heavy metal. Its sprawling nature resulted in diverse music styles from song to song, contrasting what some critics felt was the "one dimensional flavor" of the previous two albums. A much wider variety of instrumentation is used, such as piano ("Mellon Collie and the Infinite Sadness"), synthesizers and drum loops ("1979"), a live orchestra ("Tonight, Tonight") and even salt shakers and scissors ("Cupid de Locke").

All guitars on the album were tuned down a half-step in order to "make the music a little lower," according to Corgan. On some songs, such as "Jellybelly", the sixth string was tuned down an additional whole step to C♯ (referred to by Corgan as "the 'grunge tuning'"). There was a greater variety to the number of guitar overdubs utilized than on previous albums. Iha said, "[I]n the past, everything had to be overdubbed and layered—guitar overkill. That wasn't really the train of thought this time, although we did that too." "To Forgive" consists of only one live guitar take, while "Thru the Eyes of Ruby" contains approximately 70 guitar tracks. The various sections of "Porcelina of the Vast Oceans" were recorded at various times, with different instruments and recording setups, and were digitally composited in Pro Tools. Corgan and Iha shared soloing duties; Iha estimated that the guitar solo duties were divided "half and half" on the record.

Corgan has said that "For the solo in 'Fuck You (An Ode to No One),' I played until my fingers saw blood, You can't play a weak guitar solo in such a propulsive song. It's got to be attack-style." He explains this method by saying "... I put on the headphones and stand one foot away from the amp. I turn the amp up so loud that I literally have to play harder than the feedback, because if I stop playing even for an instant, the whole thing explodes."

All but two songs on the album were written by Corgan. The closing track from the first disc, "Take Me Down", was written and sung by Iha, while the album's final track, "Farewell and Goodnight", features lead vocals by all four band members and, according to the BMI database, was written solely by Iha, despite being credited on the album liner notes as being written by both Iha and Corgan. Iha wrote additional songs during the making of the album that did not make the final cut. Corgan said in a 1995 Rolling Stone interview, "[T]here are some B sides that James did that are really good. They just don't fit in the context of the album. And part of me feels bad. But over the seven years we've been together, the least uptight part of the band has been the music."

== Packaging and artwork ==
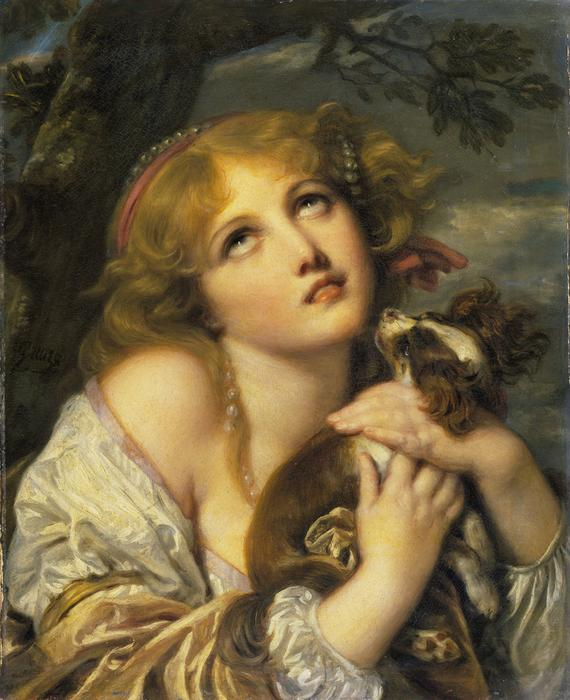
The Souvenir by Greuze, the source of the woman's face on the album's cover

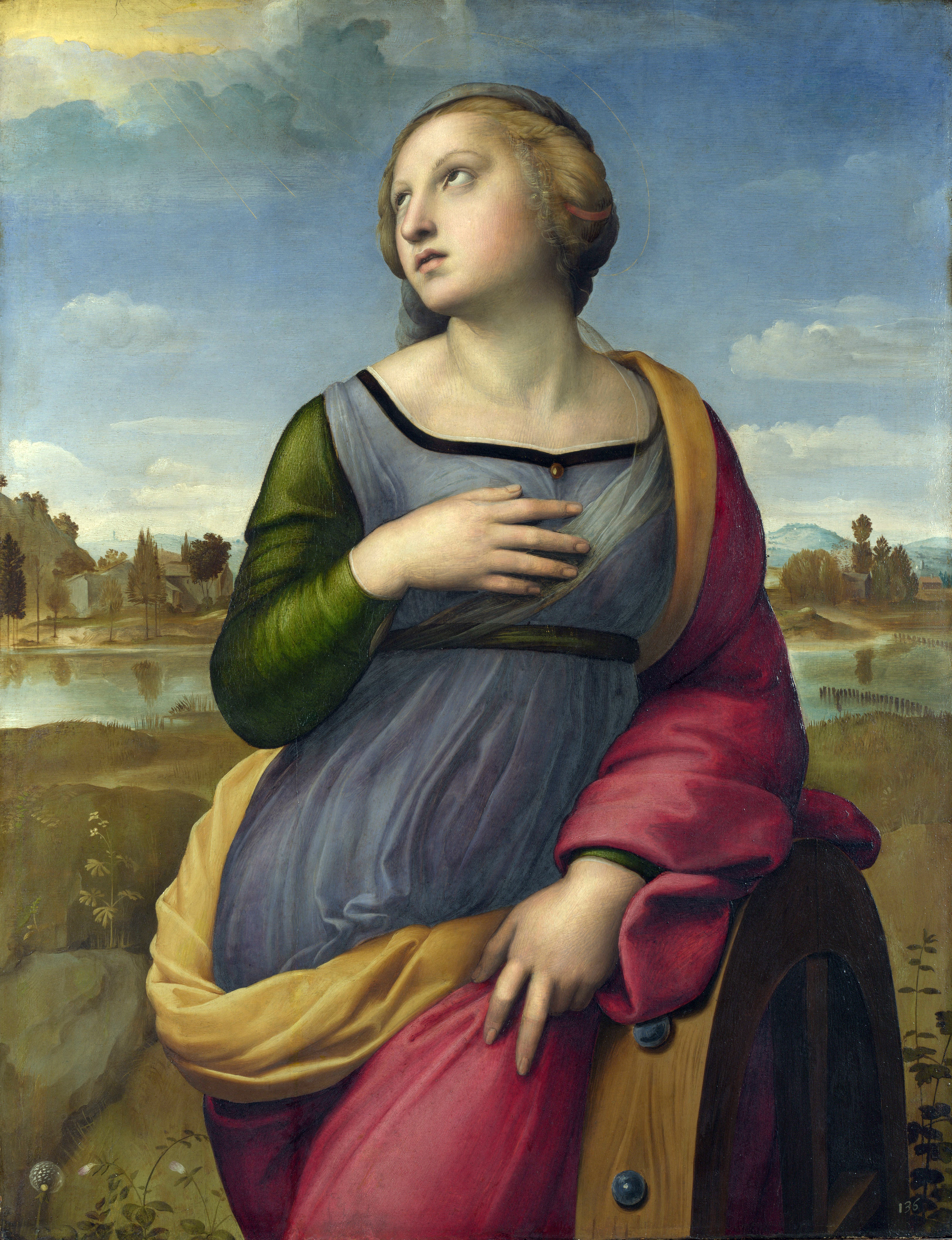
Raphael's portrait of St. Catherine, the source of the woman's body

The artwork and visual design were conceived by Wisconsin-based illustrator and collage artist John Craig, who had spent most of his career taking editorial commissions for magazines. Craig worked from Corgan's scribbled notes and crude sketches, most of which arrived via fax. Craig made other illustrations that appear throughout the album's packaging—animals smoking pipes, celestial bodies with faces, wayward children walking eerie dreamscapes—all with a vaguely antique quality. The woman on the front cover on top of a star is actually a collage made from two paintings: the face was taken from a painting entitled The Souvenir (Fidelity) by Jean-Baptiste Greuze, while the rest of the body was taken from Raphael's portrait of Saint Catherine of Alexandria.

== Release ==
Mellon Collie and the Infinite Sadness was released in the United States on October 24, 1995. The night before, after the album's release in some other countries (including the United Kingdom and Italy), the band played a release-party show at the Riviera Theater in Chicago and took part in a live FM broadcast across the United States. The following week, Mellon Collie and the Infinite Sadness debuted at number one on the Billboard 200, an unusual feat for a double-disc album that cost more than US$20. The album was later certified 11x platinum by the Recording Industry Association of America (RIAA). By the end of 1996, it had sold 6 million copies.

=== Singles ===
The album spawned five singles. While Corgan considered issuing "Jellybelly" as the album's first single, he told Chart it was passed over in favor of "Bullet with Butterfly Wings" because "'Bullet's one of those songs where, you know, it's easy to sing along to and [he affects a drawl] ya gotta sell them records." "Bullet with Butterfly Wings" was the Smashing Pumpkins' first single to reach the Top 40 on the Billboard Hot 100, debuting at number 28 and peaking at number 22. "1979", the album's second single, charted at number 12, becoming the band's highest-charting American hit. The "Zero" single was released as an EP with six B-sides. All three of these singles were certified gold by the RIAA. "Tonight, Tonight" and "Thirty-Three", the album's final singles, reached number 36 and number 39 on the Billboard charts, respectively. While it was not commercially released as a single, the song "Muzzle" reached number eight on the Modern Rock Tracks chart and number ten on the Mainstream Rock Tracks chart.

== Critical reception and legacy ==
Professional ratings
Review scores
Source	Rating
AllMusic	4.5/5 stars
Entertainment Weekly	A
The Guardian	4/5 stars
Los Angeles Times	3.5/4 stars
NME	8/10
Pitchfork	6.8/10 (1995); 9.3/10 (2012)
Q	4/5 stars
Rolling Stone	3/5 stars
The Rolling Stone Album Guide	4/5 stars
Spin	8/10

Mellon Collie and the Infinite Sadness was met with widespread critical acclaim. Christopher John Farley of Time called the album "the group's most ambitious and accomplished work yet". Farley wrote, "One gets the feeling that the band [...] charged ahead on gut instincts; the sheer scope of the album (28 songs) didn't allow for second-guessing or contrivance." Time selected Mellon Collie and the Infinite Sadness as the best album of the year in its year-end "Best of 1995" list. Entertainment Weekly gave the album an A rating; reviewer David Browne praised the group's ambition and wrote, "Mellon Collie and the Infinite Sadness is more than just the work of a tortured, finicky pop obsessive. Corgan presents himself as one of the last true believers: someone for whom spewing out this much music results in some sort of high art for the ages. He doesn't seem concerned with persistent alterna-rock questions of 'selling out', and good for him: He's aiming for something bigger and all-conquering." IGN gave the album a score of 9.5 out of 10 and said, "As the band's magnum opus it single-handedly changed the face of Alternative Rock. That said, it's not just music, but a work of art." The Music Box gave it all five stars and said, "Indeed, for all its melodramatic self-indulgence, Mellon Collie and the Infinite Sadness is one of the best double albums of new material to be released by anyone in a long time."

Rolling Stone gave the album three out of five stars. Reviewer Jim DeRogatis praised the album as "one of the rare epic rock releases whose bulk is justified in the grooves". DeRogatis noted that "the 28 songs on Mellon Collie and the Infinite Sadness aren't linked by a libretto. They're only connected conceptually through the broad theme of being part of a day in the life of a typical, alienated teen." The writer stated that the album's main flaw was Corgan's lyrics, describing the songwriter as "wallowing in his own misery and grousing about everyone and everything not meeting his expectations." DeRogatis contended that while Mellon Collie and the Infinite Sadness "may even match The Wall in its sonic accomplishments", Corgan's lyrics lacked in comparison. Mojo reviewer Ben Edmunds also praised the music while criticizing Corgan's lyrics. Edmunds wrote, "[Corgan's] lyrics appear to be the repository for the worst aspects of his most treasured influences. He writes with a heavy metal aptitude for wordplay and an inflated prog-rock conviction of its worth, a deadening combination. But there's a sliver of distance in his rage-mongering now that comments as well as expresses." Village Voice critic Robert Christgau initially dismissed the album as a "dud" in his Consumer Guide, but later graded "1979" as a "choice cut", indicating "a good song on an album that isn't worth your time or money".

=== Accolades ===
Mellon Collie and the Infinite Sadness earned the Smashing Pumpkins nominations in seven categories at the 39th Annual Grammy Awards, the second-highest number of nominations that year. The group was nominated for Album of the Year, Record of the Year ("1979"), Best Alternative Music Performance, Best Rock Performance by a Duo or Group with Vocal ("1979"), Best Hard Rock Performance with Vocal ("Bullet with Butterfly Wings"), Best Pop Instrumental Performance ("Mellon Collie and the Infinite Sadness"), and Best Music Video, Short Form ("Tonight, Tonight"). The band won a single award, for Best Hard Rock Performance with Vocal for "Bullet with Butterfly Wings"; it was the group's first. In 2000 it was voted number 76 in Colin Larkin's All Time Top 1000 Albums. Mellon Collie and the Infinite Sadness also ranked at number 14 on the 1995 Village Voice Pazz & Jop critics' poll, and 487 on Rolling Stone's 2003 list of The 500 Greatest Albums of All Time. On April 1, 2019 Rolling Stone magazine ranked it 26th greatest Grunge album of all time. In 2015, Spin included it in their list of "The 300 Best Albums of 1985–2014". The album was also included in the book 1001 Albums You Must Hear Before You Die. In 2024, Loudwire staff elected it as the best hard rock album of 1995.

== Reissues ==
=== Triple LP Vinyl Release ===
A limited-edition triple LP was released in the United Kingdom on April 29, 1996. The first pressing featured 23,000 numbered copies made in England. This edition has two additional tracks ("Tonite Reprise" and "Infinite Sadness") that are not included in CD and cassette releases. The triple LP was re-pressed with a blank white box where first-run copies were numbered.

=== 2012 reissue ===
As part of EMI Music's extensive reissue campaign, a special edition of the album was released on December 4, 2012. The 5-CD disc set consists of 64 bonus tracks of previously unreleased material, demos and alternate versions of Mellon Collie era songs—including full versions of tracks notably featured as parts of the "Pastichio Medley" from the Zero EP—as well as six new mixes of original album songs.

The package also includes a DVD consisting of footage from two live shows: Tracks 1–11 taken from the group's concert of May 15, 1996, at the Brixton Academy in London, England, originally filmed by MTV Europe, and tracks 12–15 from their show of April 7, 1996, at the Philipshalle in Düsseldorf, Germany that was filmed by the German TV show Rockpalast. The bonus content and special features were curated from the band's archives by Corgan and were remastered from the original master tapes by Bob Ludwig.

=== 30th anniversary edition ===
On November 21, 2025, it was announced that a 30th anniversary edition of the album would be released as a 6-LP set and as a 4-CD box set on January 9, 2026. This edition contained previously unreleased material and live cuts.

== Performances ==
=== Opera adaptation ===
To mark the 30th anniversary of Mellon Collie and the Infinite Sadness, Billy Corgan partnered with the Lyric Opera of Chicago for a staged, operatic reimagining, titled A Night of Mellon Collie and Infinite Sadness. The production ran for seven performances from November 21 to November 30, 2025, at the Lyric Opera House in Chicago. New arrangements and orchestrations were commissioned for the adaptation, with Corgan collaborating with conductor James Lowe. The cast included four operatic soloists — soprano Sydney Mancasola, mezzo-soprano Zoie Reams, tenor Dominick Valdés Chenes, and baritone Edward Parks — alongside Corgan, who performs on select songs.

=== The Rats in a Cage Tour ===
In May 2026, the Smashing Pumpkins announced The Rats in a Cage Tour, a North American arena tour commemorating the 30th anniversary of Mellon Collie and the Infinite Sadness. Scheduled to run from September to November 2026, each show will feature two sets, with one focused on songs from the album and one drawing from across the band's broader catalog.

== Track listing ==
Mellon Collie and the Infinite Sadness was intended as a two-record set. The CD, cassette and MiniDisc versions of the album are divided into two discs, entitled Dawn to Dusk and Twilight to Starlight. The vinyl version is divided into three records with six sides, entitled Dawn/Tea Time, Dusk/Twilight, and Midnight/Starlight. The vinyl release also features two bonus songs ("Tonite Reprise" and "Infinite Sadness"), and a completely rearranged track order. In 2012 the album was remastered and rereleased as a six-disc edition, with three bonus CDs and a DVD. A four-LP release that year retained the CD track order instead of the original LP order.

=== Compact disc/MiniDisc/cassette version ===
All songs written by Billy Corgan, except where noted.

Disc one – Dawn to Dusk
No.	Title	Writer(s)	Length
1.	"Mellon Collie and the Infinite Sadness" (Instrumental)		2:52
2.	"Tonight, Tonight"		4:14
3.	"Jellybelly"		3:01
4.	"Zero"		2:40
5.	"Here Is No Why"		3:45
6.	"Bullet with Butterfly Wings"		4:18
7.	"To Forgive"		4:17
8.	"Fuck You (An Ode to No One)" ( (Note: Track 8 is listed as simply "An Ode to No One" on original packaging/pressings and later reissues.))		4:51
9.	"Love"		4:22
10.	"Cupid de Locke"		2:50
11.	"Galapogos"		4:46
12.	"Muzzle"		3:44
13.	"Porcelina of the Vast Oceans"		9:21
14.	"Take Me Down"	James Iha	2:52
Total length:			57:54

Disc two – Twilight to Starlight
No.	Title	Writer(s)	Length
1.	"Where Boys Fear to Tread"		4:22
2.	"Bodies"		4:12
3.	"Thirty-Three"		4:10
4.	"In the Arms of Sleep"		4:12
5.	"1979"		4:26
6.	"Tales of a Scorched Earth"		3:45
7.	"Thru the Eyes of Ruby"		7:38
8.	"Stumbleine"		2:54
9.	"X.Y.U."		7:07
10.	"We Only Come Out at Night"		4:05
11.	"Beautiful"		4:18
12.	"Lily (My One and Only)"		3:31
13.	"By Starlight"		4:48
14.	"Farewell and Goodnight"	Iha, Corgan	4:22
Total length:			63:50

== Personnel ==
- Jimmy Chamberlin – drums; vocals on "Farewell and Goodnight"
- Billy Corgan – vocals, guitars, piano, keyboards, autoharp
- James Iha – guitars, vocals
- D'arcy Wretzky – bass guitar, vocals on "Beautiful", “1979”, and "Farewell and Goodnight"

=== Additional musicians ===
- Chicago Symphony Orchestra – orchestra in "Tonight, Tonight"
- Greg Leisz – pedal & lap steel guitar on "Take Me Down"

=== Technical ===
- Billy Corgan - production, mixing; string arrangement on "Tonight, Tonight"; art direction and design
- James Iha - mixing; additional production on "Take Me Down" and "Farewell and Goodnight"
- Roger Carpenter – technical assistance
- John Craig – illustration
- Flood – production, mixer
- Andrea Giacobbe – photograph
- Barry Goldberg – additional vocal recording, mixing assistance
- Adam Green – technical assistance
- Dave Kresl – string recording assistance
- Tim "Gooch" Lougee – technical assistance
- Guitar Dave Mannet – technical assistance
- Jeff Moleski – technical assistance
- Alan Moulder – production, mixer
- Frank Olinsky – art direction and design
- Claudine Pontier – recording assistance
- Audrey Riley – string arrangement on "Tonight, Tonight"
- Chris Shepard – recording
- Russ Spice – technical assistance
- Howie Weinberg – mastering
- Bob Ludwig – mastering (2012 remaster)

== Charts ==
=== Weekly charts ===
Weekly chart performance for Mellon Collie and the Infinite Sadness
Chart (1995-1997)	Peak Position
Australian Albums (ARIA)	1
Austrian Albums (Ö3 Austria)	36
Belgian Albums (Ultratop Flanders)	2
Belgian Albums (Ultratop Wallonia)	3
Canadian Albums (The Record)	1
Canada Top Albums/CDs (RPM)	2
Danish Albums (Hitlisten)	10
Dutch Albums (Album Top 100)	6
European Albums (Music & Media)	4
Finnish Albums (Suomen virallinen lista)	14
French Albums (SNEP)	6
German Albums (Offizielle Top 100)	21
Irish Albums (IRMA)	3
Italian Albums (FIMI)	17
New Zealand Albums (RMNZ)	1
Norwegian Albums (VG-lista)	7
Portuguese Albums (AFP)	5
Scottish Albums (Official Charts)	8
Spanish Albums (AFYVE)	8
Swedish Albums (Sverigetopplistan)	1
Swiss Albums (Schweizer Hitparade)	27
UK Albums (Official Charts)	4
US Billboard 200	1

2012 weekly chart performance for Mellon Collie and the Infinite Sadness
Chart (2012)	Peak Position
US Indie Store Album Sales (Billboard)	22
US Vinyl Albums (Billboard)	1

=== Year-end charts ===
1995 year-end chart performance for Mellon Collie and the Infinite Sadness
Chart (1995)	Position
Australian Albums (ARIA)	53
Belgian Albums (Ultratop Flanders)	33
Canadian Albums (RPM)	61
Dutch Albums (Album Top 100)	77
European Albums (Music & Media)	89
New Zealand Albums (RMNZ)	43
Swedish Albums & Compilations (Sverigetopplistan)	52
US Billboard 200	133

1996 year-end chart performance for Mellon Collie and the Infinite Sadness
Chart (1996)	Position
Australian Albums (ARIA)	14
Canadian Albums (RPM)	5
Dutch Albums (Album Top 100)	62
European Albums (Music & Media)	28
French Albums (SNEP)	28
German Albums (Offizielle Top 100)	47
New Zealand Albums (RMNZ)	4
Swedish Albums & Compilations (Sverigetopplistan)	79
UK Albums (OCC)	83
US Billboard 200	10

1997 year-end chart performance for Mellon Collie and the Infinite Sadness
Chart (1997)	Position
Canadian Hard Rock Albums (Nielsen Soundscan)	16
New Zealand Albums (RMNZ)	37
US Billboard 200	105

=== Decade-end charts ===
Decade-end chart performance for Mellon Collie and the Infinite Sadness
Chart (1990–1999)	Position
US Billboard 200	80

== Certifications ==
Certifications and sales for Mellon Collie and the Infinite Sadness
Region	Certification	Certified units/sales
Australia (ARIA)	4× Platinum	280,000^{^}
Belgium (BRMA)	Platinum	50,000^{*}
Canada (Music Canada)	Diamond	1,000,000^{^}
Chile	Gold	
Denmark (IFPI Danmark)	Platinum	50,000^{^}
France (SNEP)	Platinum	300,000^{*}
Germany (BVMI)	Gold	250,000^{^}
Greece (IFPI Greece)	Gold	30,000^{^}
Ireland (IRMA)	2× Platinum	30,000^{^}
Italy (FIMI) sales as of 1998	Gold	50,000^{*}
Italy (FIMI) sales since 2009	Gold	25,000^{‡}
Japan (RIAJ)	Gold	100,000^{^}
Netherlands (NVPI)	Gold	50,000^{^}
New Zealand (RMNZ)	6× Platinum	90,000^{^}
New Zealand (RMNZ) Radioscope	2× Platinum	30,000^{‡}
Norway (IFPI Norway)	Gold	25,000^{*}
Philippines (PARI)	Gold	
Portugal (AFP)	Platinum	40,000^{^}
Singapore (RIAS)	Gold	7,500^{*}
Spain (Promusicae)	Gold	50,000^{^}
Sweden (GLF)	Gold	50,000^{^}
Thailand	Silver	
United Kingdom (BPI)	Platinum	300,000^{^}
United States (RIAA)	11× Platinum	5,500,000^{‡}
^{*} Sales figures based on certification alone.^{^} Shipments figures based on certification alone.^{‡} Sales+streaming figures based on certification alone.

== See also ==
- List of best-selling albums in the United States
