= Earphoria =

Live album by The Smashing Pumpkins
- Released: 2002
- Recorded: 1991–1994
- Genre: Alternative rock
- Length: 75:41
- Label: Virgin
- Producers: Butch Vig, Billy Corgan and James Iha

The Smashing Pumpkins chronology
| Rotten Apples (2001) | Earphoria (2002) | Zeitgeist (2007) |

Professional ratings
Review scores
| Source | Rating |
|---|---|
| AllMusic | 4/5 stars |
| Classic Rock | 4/5 stars |
| Pitchfork | 6.3/10 |
| Rolling Stone | 3/5 stars |

Earphoria is a live album by American alternative rock band The Smashing Pumpkins. It is the soundtrack of the band's Vieuphoria video. While the video has been widely available since its initial release, the CD was initially released as a limited number (under 1000) of promo copies in 1994, and was subsequently heavily bootlegged. In 2002, Vieuphoria was reissued on DVD and Earphoria finally earned a commercial release.

The CD contains the audio for all the performances in Vieuphoria, and includes extended versions of the music used in the video interludes. An exception is the performance of "Silverfuck" – Earphoria includes the tease of "Over the Rainbow" while Vieuphoria edits it out, possibly owing to prohibitive licensing costs.

== Critical reception ==
"While a live document of the Pumpkins' farewell tour would have been very palatable," opined Classic Rock, "this mix-and-match collection of (mainly) live material from the full breadth of their career is far more imaginative. It's also vastly superior to their previous odds-and-sods compilation Pisces Iscariot."

== Track listing ==
All tracks written by Billy Corgan, except where noted.

| No. | Title | Notes | Length |
|---|---|---|---|
| 1. | "Sinfony" (instrumental) | Siamese Dream outtake | 0:55 |
| 2. | "Quiet" | recorded live at Center Stage in Atlanta, November 10, 1993 | 3:44 |
| 3. | "Disarm" | recorded live at Westwood Studios on The Word, an English musical show from the 1990s hosted by Terry Christian and Dani Behr in London, September 1993 | 2:56 |
| 4. | "Cherub Rock (Acoustic)" | recorded live at MTV studios in London, June 22, 1993 | 4:24 |
| 5. | "Today" | recorded live at Aragon Ballroom in Chicago, December 9, 1993 | 3:38 |
| 6. | "Bugg Superstar" (James Iha) | | 1:29 |
| 7. | "I Am One" (Corgan, Iha) | recorded live at Sala Apolo in Barcelona, September 1993 | 7:55 |
| 8. | "Pulseczar" | Gish demo | 2:27 |
| 9. | "Soma" (Corgan, Iha) | recorded live at London Astoria in London, February 23, 1994 (Per archive.org) | 6:32 |
| 10. | "Slunk" | recorded live at Nippon Television studios in Tokyo, February 1992 | 2:37 |
| 11. | "French Movie Theme" | from the "Cherub Rock" single | 1:50 |
| 12. | "Geek U.S.A." | recorded live at Alabamahalle in Munich, September 3, 1993 | 4:49 |
| 13. | "Mayonaise (Acoustic)" (Corgan, Iha) | recorded live outside the BBC studios in London, July 3, 1993 | 4:23 |
| 14. | "Silverfuck"/"Over the Rainbow"/"Jackboot" (Corgan, Edgar Harburg, Harold Arlen) | recorded live at London Astoria in London, February 24, 1994 | 13:30 |
| 15. | "Why Am I So Tired" (Iha) | Gish live demo | 15:15 |

== Personnel ==
- Jimmy Chamberlin – drums
- Billy Corgan – vocals, guitar
- James Iha – guitar, vocals
- D'arcy Wretzky – bass guitar, vocals, percussion on "Mayonaise"
