= Vieuphoria =

Video by the Smashing Pumpkins
- Released: October 4, 1994
- Recorded: 1993
- Genre: Alternative rock
- Length: 89:57
- Language: English
- Label: Virgin
- Producer: Modi

The Smashing Pumpkins chronology
Pisces Iscariot (1994)	Vieuphoria (1994)	Mellon Collie and the Infinite Sadness (1995)

Vieuphoria is a long-form music video by American alternative rock band the Smashing Pumpkins, originally released on VHS on October 4, 1994, and DVD on November 26, 2002. It was certified gold by the RIAA in late 1996.

The video consists of various Smashing Pumpkins performances, mostly from the Siamese Dream tour, interspersed with comedy bits (including "Meet the Frogs"), interviews, featurettes, and other short videos.

The soundtrack for the film, Earphoria, was released as a promo CD in 1994 and officially in 2002.

== Track listing ==
No.	Title	Length
1.	"Quiet" (live in Atlanta, 1993)
2.	"Disarm" (live on English TV, 1993)
3.	"Cherub Rock (Acoustic)" (live on MTV Europe, 1993)
4.	"Today" (live in Chicago, 1993)
5.	"I Am One" (live in Barcelona, 1993)
6.	"Soma" (live in London, 1994)
7.	"Slunk" (live on Japanese TV, 1992)
8.	"Geek U.S.A." (live on German TV, 1993)
9.	"Mayonaise (Acoustic)" (live outside BBC Studios in London, 1993)
10.	"Silverfuck" (live in London, 1994)

The DVD also includes the complete interview with Manny Chevrolet and The Lost '94 Tapes, which were found by Billy Corgan shortly before the DVD release. The performances are:

1. "Quiet"
2. "Snail"
3. "Siva"
4. "I Am One"
5. "Geek U.S.A."
6. "Soma"
7. "Hummer"
8. "Porcelina" (Note: "Porcelina" should not be confused with the similarly titled "Porcelina of the Vast Oceans" from the album Mellon Collie and the Infinite Sadness.)
9. "Silverfuck"

== Personnel ==
The Smashing Pumpkins

- Jimmy Chamberlin – drums
- Billy Corgan – vocals, guitar
- James Iha – guitar, vocals
- D'arcy Wretzky – bass guitar, vocals, percussion on "Mayonaise"

Additional musicians

- Eric Remschneider – electric cello on "Soma", "Hummer", and "Porcelina"

Production

- Modi – direction
