= Pisces Iscariot =

1994 compilation album by the Smashing Pumpkins

Compilation album of B-side singles and outtakes by the Smashing Pumpkins
- Released: October 4, 1994
- Genre: Alternative rock
- Length: 57:26
- Label: Virgin
- Producers: Butch Vig; Billy Corgan; Dale "Buffin" Griffin; James Iha; Kerry Brown; Ted de Bono

The Smashing Pumpkins chronology
Siamese Dream (1993)	Pisces Iscariot (1994)	Vieuphoria (1994)

Alternative cover
- Vinyl cover

Alternative cover
- Cassette cover

Pisces Iscariot is a compilation album by American alternative rock band the Smashing Pumpkins, released in 1994 through Virgin Records, consisting of B-sides and outtakes. Reaching number 4 in the US upon its 1994 release, Pisces Iscariot was certified platinum by the RIAA on November 23, 1994.

The album was re-released by EMI as a deluxe edition CD and LP on July 17, 2012.

== Background and history ==
Pisces Iscariot is a collection of B-sides and outtakes recorded by the Smashing Pumpkins over several years, dating back as far as 1989. According to Billy Corgan's liner notes, the songs originate from a variety of sessions, including home recordings, quick studio takes, and material that was considered for but ultimately left off the band's first two albums: Gish (recorded at Smart Studios) and Siamese Dream (recorded at Triclops Studios). The process of assembling Pisces Iscariot was largely handled by Corgan, who recalls that sequencing the album was important but does not remember exactly how long it took. He describes his approach as similar to constructing a baseball lineup, aiming to balance strengths and minimize weaknesses. Rather than viewing it as a cohesive studio album, he treated it like a mixtape he might make for a friend, saying, "Hey, check out this other stuff I did with my band that's not on the albums." He was particularly focused on the album's flow, inspired by mixtapes that could transition smoothly between different styles, such as "a great Black Sabbath track to say like a Tom Waits song." Corgan recalls that much of the responsibility for putting the album together was left to him, with the rest of the band taking a hands-off approach. He describes the process as a "mad scramble" to complete the album, with certain tracks requiring final mixing or additional work. For example, "Hello Kitty Kat" from the Siamese Dream sessions had originally been mixed by Alan Moulder and Butch Vig, but Corgan decided it needed to be remixed, calling Vig to request changes. He notes that while there were many last-minute details to address, there was little time to do so before the album's release.

"Soothe" was recorded in Corgan's bedroom at his old apartment. He originally intended to keep the song for himself, but a friend encouraged him to leave it as is. It was considered for Siamese Dream, but Corgan decided against including it. Written in 1992, "Frail and Bedazzled" was initially intended for Siamese Dream but never received the full attention Corgan felt it deserved. It was recorded in about an hour, with lyrics written in a parking garage where he used to live and rehearse. Originally a demo recorded in Corgan's bedroom, "Plume" was later reworked at Kerry Brown's studio. The song was recorded without a bass player, so Eric Harris of Deep Blue Dream unknowingly contributed to the final track. The lyrics were written while Corgan was waiting for his father to pick him up at the airport. "Whir" was "another recorded in an hour type thingers that has been in the box". "Blew Away" was written and produced by guitarist James Iha, making it the only song on the album without Corgan's direct involvement. It was recorded with Kerry Brown on drums while Jimmy Chamberlin was on vacation. One of the few songs recorded live, "Pissant" was created during the Siamese Dream sessions late at night. Corgan improvised the lyrics in ten minutes. Although there was discussion about including it on the album, he ultimately decided against it. Originally intended for Siamese Dream, "Hello Kitty Kat" was left off the album after Corgan was dissatisfied with the mix. It was written during the Gish era and was one of the songs he strongly considered for the follow-up album before ultimately discarding it.

Written during the Gish recording sessions, "Obscured" was originally supposed to appear on the Lull EP, which was initially intended as a single before being expanded. The song was eventually released as the B-side to "Today" in the UK. A cover of Fleetwood Mac's song, "Landslide" was recorded at the BBC. Corgan initially learned the song incorrectly by ear and was later shown a simpler way to play it. He described the song as personally relevant at the time of its recording. "Starla" was named after a woman Corgan met named Darla, mistakenly thinking her name was Starla. It was recorded alongside "Plume" and was originally intended as a demo before being used as a B-side for "I Am One" in the UK. The lyrics were written at the last minute, with Corgan composing the middle section on the back of an envelope. The recording was completed in multiple sessions. Originally recorded during the Gish sessions, "Blue" is the only outtake from that album to appear on Pisces Iscariot. It was released on Lull and remastered for this compilation. Corgan briefly considered including an acoustic version instead but ultimately decided against it. A cover of the Animals' song "Girl Named Sandoz" was recorded during a Peel Session and later released on the Peel Sessions EP. The experience was difficult, as the band arrived late due to a scheduling misunderstanding and felt they were treated poorly. "La Dolly Vita" was one of the band's earliest songs, recorded with Vig at the same session as "Tristessa". The song was considered for Gish but was never re-recorded for the album. Corgan described it as having a "dignity all its own" and one of his favorite hidden tracks. A track Corgan described as "hard to explain", "Spaced" was created during the Siamese Dream sessions and described as part of the "Siamese debris collection".

== Composition ==
Musically, Pisces Iscariot is an alternative rock and grunge album with heavy psychedelic rock influences. Ryan Leas of Stereogum wrote that Pisces Iscariot consists of both "fuzzed out rockers and denser, more psychedelic tracks", comparing it to Gish and Siamese Dream. He suggests that the album's psychedelic influence may be even more pronounced than on the band's previous releases. The album maintains the band's characteristic mix of distortion-heavy rock and softer, acoustic-driven moments. David Browne in Entertainment Weekly observed that the Pumpkins "can sound both raw and fussily produced at the same time". Ian Cohen of Pitchfork agrees, noting that its "ratio of sweet acoustic strummers, barnstorming riff-rockers, and expansive guitar freakouts is balanced almost exactly akin to that of Siamese Dream or Gish." He also describes the album's sequencing as "painstakingly" arranged to maintain a flow similar to a traditional LP, stating that "It still works as an album if you want it to", unlike other alternative rock compilation albums of the '90s, such as Nirvana's Incesticide and Oasis' the Masterplan. Similarly, Rolling Stone's Al Weisel stated that "Pisces Iscariot doesn't really sound like the compilation of rejects it actually is" and that it's "more varied, if less cohesive, than Gish or Siamese Dream".

=== Songs ===
"Soothe" opens Pisces Iscariot with a minimal acoustic arrangement. The song features a quiet, intimate performance, with Marc Burrows of the Quietus describing it as "a fragile and delicate thing" that presents a rare instance of Corgan in a stripped-down musical setting. The song includes background noise such as a bus pulling out into the street outside Corgan's apartment. Cohen describes "Frail and Bedazzled" as "groove-heavy glam-rock", while Burrows refers to it as an "enjoyable grunge groover." In Select, Gina Morris highlights its balance between different dynamics, stating that it successfully combines the album's shifts between "tenderly emotive and gobsmackingly powerful" moments. Writing for Spin, Dan Weiss notes the song's energetic instrumentation, pointing to its sharp rhythms and what they describe as the "jerkiest, Bonham-est drum blasts to date". They also highlight the use of high-pitched guitar leads and distortion. "Plume" is characterized by raw production and sludgy groove that features "errant tape noise" at the beginning of the track. Cohen notes that the song exemplifies the distinction between an album track and a B-side, describing it as "musically blunt" with "lyrically regressive" themes. "Whir" features intricate chord progressions, "gauzy vocals" and "brushed drumming". Jim Greer of Spin refers it as a "superlative" example of the album's more intimate moments while Kyle McGovern described it as having "tender, autumnal strums" that added a "modest sense of awe" to the album. Corgan mentioned that the song's lyrics, particularly "I've wasted all my years", were a recurring theme in his writing. The song features a long instrumental ending that the band would sometimes extend during performances.

"Blew Away" is the only song on Pisces Iscariot sung by Iha. Morris describes it as having a "Beatlesque quality", while Cohen notes that the song reflects the "country-ish lean" that would later define Iha's solo work. Burrows similarly characterizes "Blew Away" as a country-influenced track, distinguishing it from the rest of the album's material. Cohen describes "Pissant" as having a raw and blunt musical approach while Burrows calls it and "Hello Kitty Kat" as one of the album's "enjoyable grunge groovers". Morrison notes that both incorporate "feverishly fiddly guitar solos in an orgy of headbanging annihilation". AJ Ramirez of PopMatters describes "Hello Kitty Kat" as a song that builds layers of melodic guitar distortion, culminating in an intense, dynamic structure. He highlights the band's use of both softer and heavier elements, with the song featuring a shifting arrangement that progresses towards a chaotic conclusion. The guitar tone is noted for its dense, textured quality, enhanced by the use of a Big Muff pedal. Ramirez also points out that Corgan's vocals are mixed lower than the instrumentation, allowing the song's layered guitar work to remain the focal point. The song's structure includes a central riff, multiple melodic shifts, and an extended solo section that escalates in intensity before transitioning back into the final chorus. The conclusion features repeated vocal refrains and additional guitar flourishes before ending abruptly. Leas characterizes "Obscured" as "lightly psychedelic" and notes its more small-scale approach compared to the band's previous acoustic or mellow songs. The lyrics to "Obscured" reflect a sense of nostalgia, with Corgan singing, "Through these eyes, I rely on all I've seen, obscured." In the Pisces Iscariot liner notes, he describes the song as "Sunday in the park music, Chicagofest," referencing the annual music festival held in Chicago between 1978 and 1983. Cohen notes that Corgan was between 11 and 16 years old during its run, observing that the song "scans as a gorgeous reminiscence of youth on the landing in the summer, missing the innocence he's known."

"Landslide" is a cover of Fleetwood Mac's song, performed as an acoustic rendition with Corgan's vocals shifting between wailing and breathy crooning. Cohen describes the arrangement as minimal, featuring only a nylon-string acoustic guitar, a single overdub for the solo, and a restrained vocal performance. Spin's Rachel Brodsky also noted its "thickened, slightly askew acoustics" along with a "tear-inducing guitar solo". "Starla" is an 11-minute song that incorporates psychedelic rock elements. Andrew Unterberger of Spin describes its structure as a gradual build from a subdued introduction to an intense, extended climax. The review highlights the layering of guitar parts, noting how they progressively increase in intensity before intertwining in intricate patterns. Weisel describes "Blue" as showcasing the bands' "trademark bombastic fuzz barrage". "Girl Named Sandoz" is a cover of a song by the Animals drawing from the band's psychedelic influences. Unterberger describes "La Dolly Vita" as "A little Black Crowes-y in its laconic psych-blues" with lyrics attempting "visual poetry". "Spaced" features echoing samples of newsreel audio, which Corgan described as "the seven secrets of the seven veils of Apollo".

== Artwork and packaging ==
Regarding the album's visual presentation, Corgan described the artwork as an experimental project, saying, "I was just jerking around trying to make blurry pictures". He recalled feeling pressure to complete the project quickly and approached it as an artistic endeavor. The CD cover features his then-wife, Chris Fabian, captured using a Polaroid camera. He explained that the camera's close-range limitations contributed to the soft focus effect, stating, "If you shot too close, it couldn't focus right." Different release formats of the album received their own separate artwork, such as the LP and cassette releases. The liner notes of Pisces Iscariot contain Corgan's commentary on each of the album's 14 tracks. Presented in a typed format, the notes provide background on the songs, though the writing style has been described as difficult to decipher.

== Release ==
Pisces Iscariot was released on October 4, 1994, alongside the band's video compilation Vieuphoria by Virgin Records. Initially conceived as a collection of B-sides, the album unexpectedly gained commercial success. Corgan recalled being surprised that some listeners perceived it as a proper studio album, noting, "People were like, 'I love your third album.' And I was like, 'Oh fuck, no.'" Despite minimal promotion, no music videos, interviews, or marketing push, the album performed well, reaching number four on the Billboard 200, surpassing Siamese Dream's peak position of number ten. Additionally, the band's cover of Fleetwood Mac's "Landslide" became a hit, reaching number three on Billboard's Modern Rock Tracks chart. Corgan remarked on the album's unexpected reception, stating, "It was all pretty strange for our little mix tape that we didn’t do anything to promote… we didn't see that coming, but then again, we didn't see a lot coming around that time." By November 23, the album had sold one million copies and was certified platinum by the Recording Industry Association of America (RIAA). Elsewhere, the album peaked at number two in New Zealand, sixteen in Canada, seventeen in Australia, and 96 in the U.K.

== Critical reception ==
Professional ratings
Contemporary reviews
Review scores
Source	Rating
Entertainment Weekly	B+
Rolling Stone	3/5 stars
Select	4/5 medals
Spin	
Spin Alternative Record Guide	7/10

Pisces Iscariot received a range of critical reactions upon its release. While some critics saw it as a valuable addition to the band's catalog, others viewed it as an unnecessary or indulgent release. David Browne of Entertainment Weekly gave the album a B+, acknowledging that despite being a compilation of leftovers, it offered insight into the band's sound. He described the album as a "blatant cash cow" but concluded that it "delivers some fine milk". Rolling Stone's Al Weisel expressed skepticism about the motivation behind the release, but observed it to be more than a "rip-off" that their label put out to cash in on the band's success. Instead, he found Pisces Iscariot to be stronger than expected, arguing that "it's better than a lot of albums that bands labored hard to put together". Despite this, he suggested that a new studio album would have been preferable and rated it three out of five stars.

Other critics were more upfront. Writing for Spin, Jim Greer reviewed Pisces Iscariot negatively, expressing doubt about its appeal beyond the band's fanbase despite rating it a "Whoa! Slow down, pal! This album is pretty good, but you can't buy everything in the store. Can you?", indicated by a yellow square. He criticized Corgan's vocal delivery, particularly on "Landslide", describing it as an attempt to "inject emotional significance into the loopy lyrics" through "reckless oversinging". While he praised the guitar instrumentals, he argued that the album lacked "quality tunesmithery" and saw it as clear why these songs had not been included on previous releases. He concluded that the album was "pretty much thrill-free for the casual listener". Gina Morrison of Select took a positive view of Pisces Iscariot, praising its careful sequencing and arguing that it was "almost up there with Gish and Siamese Dream as a grunge classic". She noted that the compilation demonstrated the band's ability to craft compelling songs even outside of their main albums, writing that they were "virtually unable to do throwaways".

== Legacy ==
Professional ratings
Retrospective reviews
Review scores
Source	Rating
AllMusic	3.5/5 stars
The Encyclopedia of Popular Music	2/5 stars
Pitchfork	8.1/10
PopMatters	8/10
The Rolling Stone Album Guide	2/5 stars
Record Collector	4/5 stars
The Skinny	3/5 stars

Retrospective reviews have generally regarded Pisces Iscariot as a well-received B-sides compilation, with critics noting its cohesion and the strength of its material. Greg Prato of AllMusic stated that the collection demonstrated Corgan's prolific songwriting, describing the quality of the songs as "often just as strong as the songs that were officially released". Pitchfork's Ian Cohen wrote that the album was "something close to essential" for fans and noted its sequencing, which he described as maintaining "a concept record's sonic peaks and valleys". Writing for Stereogum, Ryan Leas argued that Pisces Iscariot belongs to "a rarer category" of vault-clearing releases, calling it "shockingly strong" and stating that it is "often placed head and shoulders above almost anything Billy Corgan did after, save the following year's monolithic Mellon Collie and the Infinite Sadness". Mark Shukla of The Skinny described it as "stunning" and noted its "intensely passionate feel". In July 2014, Guitar World placed Pisces Iscariot among its "Superunknown: 50 Iconic Albums That Defined 1994" list.

== Reissues ==
Pisces Iscariot was reissued on July 16, 2012, in the UK and July 17, 2012, in the US through Virgin Records as part of the Smashing Pumpkins' reissue series. A deluxe edition of the album was also released as an expanded two-disc box set that includes the remastered version of the original album by Bob Ludwig, a bonus disc with 17 additional tracks composed of alternative mixes, covers and original material, a DVD featuring early Smashing Pumpkins performances, and a cassette reproduction of the band's 1989 demo tape. The new edition also features updated liner notes by Corgan and David Wild.

== Track listing ==
All tracks are written by Billy Corgan, unless stated otherwise.

Pisces Iscariot track listing
No.	Title	Writer(s)	Single	Length
1.	"Soothe"		"Disarm"	2:36
2.	"Frail and Bedazzled"		Siamese Dream outtake	3:17
3.	"Plume"	Billy Corgan, James Iha	"I Am One" 1992 single release	3:38
4.	"Whir"		Siamese Dream outtake	4:10
5.	"Blew Away"	James Iha	"Disarm"	3:32
6.	"Pissant"		"Cherub Rock"	2:31
7.	"Hello Kitty Kat"		"Today"	4:33
8.	"Obscured"		Gish outtake, "Today"	5:22
9.	"Landslide" (Fleetwood Mac cover)	Stevie Nicks	"Disarm"	3:11
10.	"Starla"		"I Am One" 1992 single release	11:01
11.	"Blue"		Lull EP	3:20
12.	"Girl Named Sandoz" (The Animals cover)	Eric Burdon, Vic Briggs, John Weider, Barry Jenkins, Danny McCulloch (The Animals)	Peel Sessions EP	3:35
13.	"La Dolly Vita"		"Tristessa"	4:16
14.	"Spaced"		Siamese Dream outtake	2:25

A limited pressing of 2,000 copies of Pisces Iscariot included a free 7-inch single.

Bonus single
No.	Title	Single	Length
1.	"Not Worth Asking"	"I Am One" 1989 7-inch	4:01
2.	"Honey Spider II"	Moon demo tape	2:29

2012 Reissue bonus CD
No.	Title	Writer(s)	Length
1.	"By June" (Ignoffo Sessions/2012 Mix)		2:08
2.	"My Dahlia" (Ignoffo Sessions/2012 Mix)		3:46
3.	"Jesus Loves His Babies" (Gish Sessions Rough Mix)		2:57
4.	"Cinnamon Girl" (Ignoffo Sessions/2012 Mix)	Neil Young	2:40
5.	"Glynis" (2012 Mix)		4:54
6.	"Crawl" (Gish Sessions outtake)		6:54
7.	"Cinder Open" (Eddy St. demo/2012 Mix)		3:36
8.	"Blissed" (Sadlands demo/2012 Mix)		3:12
9.	"Slunk" (live; 2012 remaster)		2:36
10.	"Jackie Blue"	Steve Cash, Larry Lee (Ozark Mountain Daredevils)	3:55
11.	"Venus in Furs" (live)	Lou Reed (The Velvet Underground)	4:35
12.	"Translucent" (Sadlands demo/2012 mix)		3:46
13.	"French Movie Theme" (Siamese Sessions outtake)		1:55
14.	"Purr Snickety" (Gish B-sides session outtake)		2:49
15.	"There It Goes" (demo/2012 Mix)		5:17
16.	"Vanilla" (Ignoffo Sessions)		2:49
17.	"Why Am I So Tired" (live in studio demo)		15:13

2012 Reissue bonus DVD
No.	Title	Length
1.	"Intro by Billy Corgan"
2.	"Pulse Cable Show Introduction by Lou Hinkhouse"
3.	"There It Goes" (Pulse Basement Jam – Chicago)
4.	"She" (Pulse Basement Jam – Chicago)
5.	"Under Your Spell" (Pulse Basement Jam – Chicago)
6.	"My Eternity" (Pulse Basement Jam – Chicago)
7.	"Bleed" (Pulse Basement Jam – Chicago)
8.	"Nothing and Everything" (Pulse Basement Jam – Chicago)
9.	"Jennifer Ever" (Pulse Basement Jam – Chicago)
10.	"Death of a Mind" (Pulse Basement Jam – Chicago)
11.	"Spiteface" (Pulse Basement Jam – Chicago)
12.	"Blue"
13.	"Offer Up"
14.	"The Joker"
15.	"Slunk"
16.	"Dancing in the Moonlight"
17.	"Snap"
18.	"Hello Kitty Kat"

2012 Reissue bonus tape
No.	Title	Length
1.	"A1: Jennifer Ever"	3:44
2.	"A2: East"	4:11
3.	"A3: Nothing and Everything"	6:04
4.	"B1: Sun" (remix)	5:30
5.	"B2: She" (live)	4:16
6.	"B3: Spiteface"	4:39

== Personnel ==
Credits adapted from the album's liner notes:

=== The Smashing Pumpkins ===
- Billy Corgan – vocals, guitar, production (1–4, 6–8, 10–11, 13–14), photography, packaging
- James Iha – guitar, vocals, production (5)
- Jimmy Chamberlin – drums
- D'arcy Wretzky – bass guitar

=== Technical ===
- Butch Vig – production (2, 4, 6–8, 11, 13–14)
- Kerry Brown – production (3, 5, 10) and drums (5)
- Dale "Buffin" Griffin – production (12)
- Ted de Bono – production (9)
- Rachel Gutek – design assistant
- Michael Meister – photography, packaging

== Charts ==
=== Weekly charts ===
Weekly chart performance of Pisces Iscariot
Chart (1994–1996)	Peak position
Australian Albums (ARIA)	17
Canada Top Albums/CDs (RPM)	16
New Zealand Albums (RMNZ)	2
UK Albums (Official Charts)	96
US Billboard 200	4

=== Year-end charts ===
Year-end chart performance of Pisces Iscariot
Chart (1995)	Position
US Billboard 200	147

=== Single ===
Chart performance of singles from Pisces Iscariot
Single	Chart (1994)	Peak position
"Landslide"	Modern Rock Tracks	3

== Certifications ==
Certifications for Pisces Iscariot
Region	Certification	Certified units/sales
Canada (Music Canada)	Platinum	100,000^{^}
New Zealand (RMNZ)	Gold	7,500^{^}
United States (RIAA)	Platinum	1,000,000^{^}
^{^} Shipments figures based on certification alone.

== Release history ==
Region	Date	Label	Format	Catalog
United States	October 4, 1994	Caroline	LP	1767
United States	October 4, 1994	Virgin	Cassette tape	39834
United States	October 4, 1994	Virgin	Compact disc	7243 8 39834 2 1
United Kingdom	October 21, 1996	Hut	Compact disc	CDHUT 41
