= Lull (EP) =

EP by the Smashing Pumpkins
- Released: November 1, 1991
- Recorded: 1991, except "Bye June" (1989)
- Genre: Alternative rock
- Length: 14:17
- Labels: Caroline, Virgin
- Producers: Billy Corgan and Butch Vig

The Smashing Pumpkins chronology
Gish (1991)	Lull (1991)	Peel Sessions (1992)

Professional ratings
Review scores
Source	Rating
AllMusic	3/5 stars
Robert Christgau	(neither)

Lull is an EP by American alternative rock band the Smashing Pumpkins, released November 1, 1991.

== Background ==
"Rhinoceros" was taken from Gish (but the feedback ending is cut here), "Blue" later appeared on Pisces Iscariot and an acoustic version later appeared on the bonus disc for the 2011 reissue of Gish. A live version of "Slunk" later appeared on Vieuphoria and its soundtrack album Earphoria with alternate lyrics (the line "Sister above" is changed to "You talk shit like a chump"). As well, a demo version of "Slunk" exists with Jimmy Chamberlin on vocals with alternate lyrics called "Chump", (the line "Sister above" is changed to "You suck dick like a chump"). "Blue" and "Slunk" were outtakes from the Gish sessions.

"Bye June" is a 1989 recording from the Reel Time Studio Sessions, originally released on the Moon demo.

The liner notes include partial lyrics for the song "Obscured", written in cake frosting like the album cover. The song would eventually be released as a B-side on the single for "Today" in 1993 and then on the B-side collection Pisces Iscariot in 1994. "Obscured" was originally intended by Billy Corgan to be on Lull but was dropped for reasons that are unclear.

In the liner notes for Pisces Iscariot, Corgan wrote:

"Obscured" is old because it was originally supposed to be on the Lull EP which was really supposed to be a single but they tricked me.

== Track listing ==
All songs written by Billy Corgan.

1. "Rhinoceros" – 5:57
2. "Blue" – 3:22
3. "Slunk" – 2:49
4. "Bye June" – 2:09

== Personnel ==
The Smashing Pumpkins

- Billy Corgan – vocals, guitar
- James Iha – guitar, vocals
- D'arcy Wretzky – bass, vocals
- Jimmy Chamberlin – drums

Production

- Butch Vig – production

== Charts ==
Weekly chart performance for "Lull"
Chart (1997)	Peak position
Canada Singles Sales (The Record)	34
