= A Gothic–Industrial Tribute to Smashing Pumpkins =

Compilation album tribute album by Various artists
- Released: 23 January 2001
- Label: Cleopatra

Professional ratings
Review scores
| Source | Rating |
|---|---|
| Allmusic | 2/5 stars |

A Gothic–Industrial Tribute to Smashing Pumpkins is a 2001 tribute album, featuring a variety of artists covering songs from the American alternative rock band Smashing Pumpkins.

== Track listing ==
1. "Rhinoceros" – Günter Schulz & En Esch
2. "Ava Adore" – Candymachine 88 with Tina Root of Switchblade Symphony
3. "Bullet with Butterfly Wings" – Sigue Sigue Sputnik
4. "The End Is the Beginning Is the End" – Dark Corridor
5. "Disarm" – 16 Volt Vs. Spahn Ranch
6. "Cherub Rock" – Razed In Black
7. "God" – Electric Hellfire Club
8. "1979" – PIG
9. "Frail & Bedazzled" – Godbox
10. "Today" – Shining (Julian Beeston ex Nitzer Ebb)
11. "Eye" – Rosetta Stone
12. "Soma" – Bella Morte
13. "Zero" – Synical
