= Drown (The Smashing Pumpkins song) =

Promotional single by Smashing Pumpkins

from the album Singles: Original Motion Picture Soundtrack
- Released: June 30, 1992
- Genre: Grunge
- Length: 8:17 on Singles: Original Motion Picture Soundtrack; 4:30 on Rotten Apples
- Label: Epic
- Songwriter: Billy Corgan
- Producers: Billy Corgan, Butch Vig

Smashing Pumpkins singles chronology
"Rhinoceros" (1991)	"Drown" (1992)	"Cherub Rock" (1993)

"Drown" is a song by American alternative rock band The Smashing Pumpkins from the soundtrack to the 1992 Cameron Crowe film Singles.

== Release ==
The song debuted during the Gish tour and was written not long after that record was released. The first take of the song was recorded at Waterfront Studios, which belongs to Lenny Kravitz, who was also signed to Virgin Records. The song became a moderate radio hit in mid-1992 and gave the band significant exposure just before work commenced on Siamese Dream.

"Drown" was to be released as a commercial single, but, as Billy Corgan explained,

We wanted it to be a single, we were pushing for it. I was even willing to make it a video. Radio stations were playing it. And when it came time for the third single, they said, 'Screaming Trees.' And I was like, 'Screaming Trees??' But what label is Alice in Chains on and what label are the Screaming Trees on? Epic, which is the label that put out the soundtrack. And that's what killed the song.

Nonetheless, the song was given a promotional single, then becoming their highest-charting single at the time, peaking at number 24 on the U.S. Alternative Songs chart.

There are two versions of the song. The original 8:17 version is longer and ends with a section of guitar feedback and E-Bow effects, creating a moody and emotional finish. The shorter 4:30 version leaves this part out. The long version of the song is not available on streaming platforms.

A demo version of the song was released through the Smashing Pumpkins Fan Collaborative (SPRC), which is 8:58 in length.

=== Greatest hits release ===
The song was also released on the band's official greatest hits compilation Rotten Apples in 2001, though the length of the song was reduced from 8:17 to 4:30, cutting off the extended feedback and E-Bow solo at the end. "Drown" was considered for Pisces Iscariot, but Corgan decided against it.

=== Gish (2011 reissue) ===
The complete version of "Drown" was included with an alternate guitar solo on the bonus CD in the 2011 Reissue of Gish. It is not available on the streaming release of the album.

== Charts ==
Chart (1992)	Peak position
US Alternative Airplay (Billboard)	24

== Covers ==
Alice Glass covered and released the song on 18 April 2024.

Glass’ cover was later re-released on Sumerian Records’s 2026 tribute album, Sending Hearts To All My Dearies: A Tribute To The Smashing Pumpkins.
