= Rocket (The Smashing Pumpkins song) =

1994 single by The Smashing Pumpkins

Single by the Smashing Pumpkins

from the album Siamese Dream
- B-side: "Never Let Me Down Again"
- Released: December 27, 1994
- Genre: Grunge; shoegaze; glam rock; psychedelic pop
- Length: 4:06
- Label: Virgin
- Songwriter: Billy Corgan
- Producers: Butch Vig; Billy Corgan

The Smashing Pumpkins singles chronology
"Disarm" (1994)	"Rocket" (1994)	"Bullet with Butterfly Wings" (1995)

Music video
- "Rocket" on YouTube

"Rocket" is a song by American alternative rock band the Smashing Pumpkins. It was released in December 1994 as the fourth and final single from their second album, Siamese Dream (1993), and was written by frontman Billy Corgan. The song charted in Canada, New Zealand and the United Kingdom, as well as on the US Billboard Album Rock Tracks chart. It was one of the few singles that did not appear on the Smashing Pumpkins' greatest hits album Rotten Apples.

== Composition ==
"Rocket" is a rock song. Being more melodic than Siamese Dream single "Cherub Rock" and the band's Gish-era work in the vein of the track, it was described as a "standard Pumpkins fuzzed-out heavy blissness." The song also features a repetitive guitar line pulsing through, creating a wall of sound effect.

== Release and reception ==
A 7" vinyl record was released in the United Kingdom as part of the Siamese Singles box set, and also as a separate release. Its B-side was a cover version of the Depeche Mode song "Never Let Me Down Again." The song was recorded by request of bassist D'arcy Wretzky who is a long-time Depeche Mode fan. It was recorded at the BBC, perhaps in one take. It featured on the Depeche Mode tribute album For the Masses, as well as the soundtrack for the film Not Another Teen Movie.

"Rocket" spent five weeks on the New Zealand Singles Chart, peaking at number 26. It also charted within the top 30 on the US Main Rock Tracks chart and the Canadian RPM Top Singles chart in 1994. On January 7, 1995, the single made its only appearance on the UK Singles Chart, debuting and peaking at number 89.

== Music video ==
The music video features a group of scientifically-minded children who receive an interplanetary broadcast sent by the Smashing Pumpkins and set out to build a rocket to fly to another planet to see the band perform. They build the advanced rocket piece-by-piece themselves and fly into outer space. Upon arrival on the planet, the children are greatly surprised to discover that the band members have grown old since their first transmission. The band's 2001 Greatest Hits Video Collection DVD also includes a different cut of the video with only the band's performance. It was directed by Jonathan Dayton and Valerie Faris, who would go on to direct more videos for the Smashing Pumpkins.

== Track listing ==
1. "Rocket" (Billy Corgan) - 4:05
2. "Never Let Me Down Again" (Martin Gore) - 4:01

== Charts ==
Chart (1994–1995)	Peak position
Canada Top Singles (RPM)	29
New Zealand (Recorded Music NZ)	26
UK Singles (Official Charts)	89
US Mainstream Rock (Billboard)	28
