= Midnight in the Patch: Tribute to the Smashing Pumpkins =

Compilation album by Various artists
- Released: July 31, 2001
- Label: Vitamin Records

Professional ratings
Review scores
Source	Rating
Allmusic	1.5/5 stars

Midnight in the Patch: Tribute to the Smashing Pumpkins is a 2001 tribute album, featuring a variety of artists covering songs from the American alternative rock band Smashing Pumpkins.

== Track listing ==
No.	Title	Artist	Length
1.	"Perfect"	Zulana	4:08
2.	"Ava Adore"	1000 MPH	5:42
3.	"Zero"	Dark	3:00
4.	"Disarm"	Da Capo Players	3:19
5.	"Bullet with Butterfly Wings"	Razorblade Smile	5:24
6.	"Stand Inside Your Love"	Scarecrow Adams	3:37
7.	"Mayonnaise"	Gringo Floyd	4:38
8.	"Today"	Solomon Burke Jr.	2:52
9.	"Try, Try, Try"	Evasl	4:40
10.	"Rhinoceros"	Jimmy And The Tercels	3:49
11.	"1979"	Minstrels	4:26
12.	"Tonight, Tonight"	Da Capo Players	3:53
