= Peel Sessions (The Smashing Pumpkins EP) =

EP by The Smashing Pumpkins
- Released: June 15, 1992
- Recorded: September 8, 1991
- Genre: Alternative rock
- Length: 12:02
- Label: Hut
- Producer: Dale Griffin

The Smashing Pumpkins chronology
Lull (1991)	Peel Sessions (1992)	Siamese Dream (1993)

Professional ratings
Review scores
Source	Rating
AllMusic	2/5 stars
Select	4/5 medals

Peel Sessions is an EP by The Smashing Pumpkins, released in 1992. The songs were recorded live on September 8, 1991, for John Peel's Radio 1 show and later appeared on Rarities and B-Sides. "Siva" and "Girl Named Sandoz" were included on the compilation album, Pisces Iscariot, as well as the deluxe reissue of Gish.

== Track listing ==
No.	Title	Writer(s)	Length
1.	"Siva"	Billy Corgan	4:53
2.	"Girl Named Sandoz"	Eric Burdon, Vic Briggs, John Weider, Barry Jenkins, Danny McCulloch	3:38
3.	"Smiley"	Billy Corgan	3:31
Total length:			12:02

=== Notes ===
- "Girl Named Sandoz" is a reference to Sandoz Laboratories, where LSD was invented. It was originally performed by The Animals, and later appeared on Pisces Iscariot.

== Personnel ==
The Smashing Pumpkins

- Billy Corgan – vocals, guitar
- James Iha – guitar, vocals
- D'arcy Wretzky – bass guitar
- Jimmy Chamberlin – drums

Production

- Dale Griffin – production
- Mike Engles – engineering
- Robin Marks – engineering
