= The Killer in You: A Tribute to Smashing Pumpkins =

2005 compilation album by various artists

The Killer In You: A Tribute to Smashing Pumpkins

Compilation album by Various Artists
- Released: November 15, 2005 (digital); January 31, 2006 (compact disc)
- Recorded: 2004–2005
- Genre: Post-hardcore; alternative rock; hard rock
- Label: Reignition Records
- Producer: Christopher Kincaid; Justina Powell

Professional ratings
Review scores
Source	Rating
Allmusic	3.5/5 stars

The Killer In You: A Tribute to Smashing Pumpkins is a 2005 tribute album, featuring a variety of artists covering songs from the American alternative rock band Smashing Pumpkins. The release was made available digitally on November 15, 2005, followed by the compact disc version three months later on January 31, 2006.

== Track listing ==
All songs written by Billy Corgan, except where noted.

No.	Title	Writer(s)	Artist	Length
1.	"Cherub Rock"		Roses Are Red	5:04
2.	"JellyBelly"		A Thorn for Every Heart	2:40
3.	"Soma"	Corgan, James Iha	Poison the Well	6:41
4.	"Mayonaise"	Corgan, Iha	Emanuel	5:35
5.	"Today"		Armor for Sleep	3:24
6.	"Eye"		Hopesfall	4:51
7.	"The Everlasting Gaze"		A Static Lullaby	4:01
8.	"1979"		Vaux	3:57
9.	"Zero"		32 Leaves	2:40
10.	"We Only Come Out At Night"		Murder by Death	3:14
11.	"Quiet"		Eighteen Visions	3:46
