= Today (The Smashing Pumpkins song) =

1993 single by the Smashing Pumpkins

Single by the Smashing Pumpkins

from the album Siamese Dream
- B-side: "Hello Kitty Kat"; "Obscured"; "Apathy's Last Kiss"
- Released: September 13, 1993
- Genre: Alternative rock; grunge; shoegaze
- Length: 3:22
- Label: Virgin
- Songwriter: Billy Corgan
- Producers: Butch Vig; Billy Corgan

The Smashing Pumpkins singles chronology
"Cherub Rock" (1993)	"Today" (1993)	"Disarm" (1994)

Music video
- "Today" on YouTube

"Today" is a song by American alternative rock band the Smashing Pumpkins, written by lead vocalist and guitarist Billy Corgan. The song, though seemingly upbeat, contains dark lyrics; Corgan wrote the song about a day in which he was having suicidal thoughts. The contrast between the grim subject matter of the song and the soft instrumental part during the verses, coupled with use of irony in the lyrics, left many listeners unaware of the song's tale of depression and desperation. The song alternates between quiet, dreamy verses and loud choruses with layered, distorted guitars.

"Today" was released in September 1993 as the second single from the band's second album and major label debut, Siamese Dream. "Today" and its follow-up "Disarm" are credited in AllMusic for popularizing the band and "sen[ding] [Siamese Dream] into the stratosphere". "Today" has been generally well received by critics; a Blender article described it as having "achieved a remarkable status as one of the defining songs of its generation, perfectly mirroring the fractured alienation of American youth in the 1990s".

== Background and recording ==
After the release and minor success of the band's debut album, Gish, the Smashing Pumpkins were being hyped as "the next Nirvana". However, the band was experiencing several difficulties at the time. Drummer Jimmy Chamberlin was undergoing an increasingly severe addiction to heroin; James Iha and D'arcy Wretzky had recently broken up their romantic relationship; and Billy Corgan was plagued by writer's block and had become depressed to the point of contemplating suicide. He recalled that "after the first album, I became completely suicidal. It was an eight-month depression, give or take a month, and I was pretty suicidal for about two or three months." Under this pressure and with other complications, the Pumpkins entered the Triclops Sound Studios in Atlanta to record the follow-up to Gish.

Corgan said, "The day after I wrote 'Today', my manager heard it and said, 'It's a hit', and I guess in a way, it was." Corgan played the self-recorded demo to producer Butch Vig and to the rest of his band, all of whom responded positively. "Today" already had a chord progression and a melody, but Corgan felt there needed to be an opening riff to the song. One day, "out of the blue, I heard the opening lick note for note in my head", Corgan said. "When I added the opening riff, it completely changed the character of the song. Suddenly, I had a song that was starting out quiet and then got very loud." Soon afterwards, Virgin Records executives were sent to check up on the band after hearing about their problems, but were pleased with the demo. The reaction from the executives only served to put more stress on Corgan; as a result, he recorded most of the guitar and bass guitar parts himself, including on the finished version of "Today".

Siamese Dream was completed after running four months after the deadline and considerably exceeding its budget. Virgin Records executives saw "Today" as the ideal lead single, but Corgan wanted "Cherub Rock", one of the last songs written for the album, as the lead single. Ultimately, "Cherub Rock" was released first, but it was only a modest success. "Today" brought the band popularity through wide radio airplay and a successful music video.

== Composition and lyrics ==
The guitar introduction to "Today," which repeats for four bars

"Today" is written in the key of E-flat major (E♭) and its guitar parts are played in standard tuning. While Corgan briefly considered tuning the guitar down a half-step and playing the song with the fingerings and positions of E major, he said, "There was something about the E♭ voicing that I liked. So it's absolutely, intentionally in E♭, not E." "Today" is one of the Siamese Dream songs on which Corgan took over Iha and Wretzky's duties on guitar and bass to ensure quality; Wretzky later stated that Corgan "can do something in three takes where it would maybe take me 20".

"Today"
A 20 second sample of "Today" from the Smashing Pumpkins' 1993 album, Siamese Dream. This sample illustrates the song's dynamic changes when it moves from the refrain to the first verse.

The song, spanning three minutes and 21 seconds, begins with a one-measure opening guitar riff that alludes to the E♭ major-pentatonic scale. Corgan uses this riff (along with variations on it) to emphasize certain parts and to indicate shifts in the song. After the riff is played four times, the rest of the band enters backed with feedback-driven guitars. Ned Raggett of Allmusic commented on the song's ability to "alternate between calmer, almost Cure-like sections and the louder crunches, [and Corgan's] soon-to-be-trademark guitar style taking My Bloody Valentine's own hypnotic riffing to more accessible results". The chorus, consisting of multiple guitar tracks playing barre chords, is an example of the band's tendency to overdub several rhythm guitar tracks. While the song does not include a standard guitar solo, a short melodic guitar part appears during the bridge. Corgan explained: "The little guitar break over the C chord is actually a forwards sample that we laid in backwards. Then there's a weird vocal effect that moves across the speakers, a 'yan-yan-yan-yan' thing, which was generated by using a Roland Space Echo to regenerate on the last word of the vocal line, 'I wanna turn you on.'"

The dark, ironic lyrics of "Today", describing a day when Corgan was feeling depressed and suicidal, contrast with the instrumentation. Michael Snyder of the San Francisco Chronicle said that the song is "downright pretty as rock ballads go" but that "Corgan manages to convey the exhilaration and tragic release he seeks." Corgan told Rolling Stone that "I was really suicidal ... I just thought it was funny to write a song that said today is the greatest day of your life because it can't get any worse." Corgan later compared writing the lyrics of "Today" and "Disarm" to "ripping [his] guts out".

== Music video ==
Promotional picture of Billy Corgan (right) and James Iha (left), during the shooting of the music video

The music video, directed by Stéphane Sednaoui, brought even more mainstream success to the band through repeated airplay on MTV. Debuting in September 1993, it was shot with low quality photographic equipment, which, like several other early Pumpkins videos, was an intentional stylistic decision. Corgan said that the video's plot was inspired by a memory he had of an ice cream truck driver who, upon quitting his job, gave out the rest of his ice cream to the neighborhood children. This image was then melded with Sednaoui's own sensibilities inspired by the film Zabriskie Point. The video is available on The Smashing Pumpkins – Greatest Hits Video Collection (1991–2000) DVD, released in 2001.

The video begins with Corgan reading a comic book dressed in an ice cream man uniform. A clip of the intro to the song is played and stopped repeatedly before the song begins. Groups of two or more people are kissing each other around him as he drives in an ice cream van through a desert. Corgan picks up a dress-wearing Iha and the two drive for a while before stopping at a gas station, where Chamberlin and Wretzky appear as gas attendants. After Iha changes into a yellow and white cowboy outfit, the band paints the van in various colors. More people are shown kissing in the hills as the band drives away from the gas station in the van. However, Corgan is ultimately kicked out, and the video ends with him walking off the road wearing a cowboy hat as the van drives away. The video was filmed on August 29, 1993.

== Reception ==
"Today" has received positive reviews. Ned Raggett of AllMusic called the song an "at-once storming but catchy smash single". Johnny Black of Blender noted that the song "has achieved a remarkable status as one of the defining songs of its generation". Robert Christgau cited "Today" as one of the highlights of Siamese Dream. However, Stylus Magazine's Brett Hickman said "nothing can make 'Today' sound fresh again [on the live album Earphoria, which this particular review is of]. This is a prime example of the power that radio and MTV have in ruining a great song." "Today" topped Eye Weekly magazine's year-end list of best singles, and also appeared at number 32 on NME's year-end list of best singles.

"Today" was one of the most successful early singles by the Smashing Pumpkins, and additionally has been recognized as one of the songs that brought the Pumpkins into the mainstream. The song was, at the time of its release, the highest-charting song by the band, peaking at number four on the Billboard Modern Rock Tracks. The song also reached a peak position of number 28 on the Billboard Mainstream Rock Tracks, and was one of the first Pumpkins songs to chart in the UK, peaking at number 44. "Today" was later called one of the "hits that took the cool alternative band into stadium rock territory" by the BBC's Dan Tallis in a review of the band's greatest hits album, Rotten Apples, and similarly referred to as the "Smashing Pumpkins' red carpet to the glorified frat houses of alternative rock radio" by Nick Sylvester of Pitchfork Media.

=== Accolades ===
Accolades for "Today"
Publication	Country	Accolade	Year	Rank
Eye Weekly	Canada	Singles of the Year	1993	1
NME	UK	Singles of the Year	1993	32
Blender	U.S.	The Greatest Songs Ever!	2001	*
Q	UK	The 1001 Best Songs Ever (2003)	2003	462
97X	U.S.	The 500 Best Modern Rock Songs of All Time	2006	63

(*) designates unordered lists.

== Other releases ==
"Today" has appeared on several Smashing Pumpkins official releases, including the band's greatest hits album Rotten Apples and the box set Siamese Singles. A live version of "Today" performed in the band's hometown of Chicago was included on the 1994 video release Vieuphoria and on its companion album Earphoria, and was praised as "a triumphant recording" by Pitchfork's Chris Dahlen. A different live recording from Chicago appears on the promotional album Live in Chicago 23.10.95 and the song is featured on 14 volumes of Live Smashing Pumpkins. The song has also appeared in different versions on several Smashing Pumpkins bootlegs such as Unplugged: 100% Pure Acoustic Performances, which includes unofficial live recordings and acoustic recordings.

"Today" has been included in a few compilation albums. The eighteenth volume of Indie Top 20, a Melody Maker-sponsored compilation series which serves as a "time capsule of U.K. indie music", features "Today" as its fourth track. The song appears on a two-disc MTV Dutch import, Rock Am Ring, a collection of hit singles from the early 1990s.

=== Cover versions ===
The song has been covered for several tribute albums. A Gothic–Industrial Tribute to Smashing Pumpkins features a dance music-influenced version of the song by industrial band Shining. Solomon Burke Jr., the son of influential soul musician Solomon Burke, contributed a "radically altered" rendition of "Today" for Midnight in the Patch: Tribute to the Smashing Pumpkins, performing the song in a Motown style. Other covers of "Today" for tribute albums include performances by Armor for Sleep on The Killer in You: A Tribute to Smashing Pumpkins and by Death Rawk Boy on Ghost Children / Friends and Enemies. In 2026, it was covered by Yonaka on Sending Hearts To All My Dearies: A Tribute To The Smashing Pumpkins.

The main guitar passage was also sampled by Japanese hip-hop act Dragon Ash in its song "Grateful Days". It was covered by John Craigie on his album Leave the Fire Behind. Deerhunter reinterpreted the song live in 2015, following a legal dispute between frontman Bradford Cox and Corgan, "transforming the song's opening riff into a 10-minute noise-pop improvisation". In 2020 the Fruit Bats released a "breezy cover" of "Today" and a re-working of the entire "Siamese Dream" album. A. G. Cook also covered the song in 2020 on his debut album 7G, and covered it once more under the title "Today (Dream Mix)" on his follow-up remix album Apple vs. 7G, using an altered chord progression. It was covered by Olivia Holt in 2021 for the TV series Cruel Summer.

== Formats and track listings ==
UK CD, 12-inch, and cassette single
No.	Title	Length
1.	"Today"	3:22
2.	"Hello Kitty Kat"	4:32
3.	"Obscured"	5:20
Total length:		13:14

UK 7-inch single
No.	Title	Length
1.	"Today"	3:22
2.	"Apathy's Last Kiss"	2:42
Total length:		6:04

Japanese CD single
No.	Title	Length
1.	"Today"	3:22
2.	"Hello Kitty Kat"	4:32
3.	"Obscured"	5:20
4.	"French Movie Theme"	3:50
5.	"Apathy's Last Kiss"	2:43
Total length:		19:47

== Personnel ==
- Jimmy Chamberlin – drums
- Billy Corgan – guitars, bass guitar, vocals, production
- Bob Ludwig – mastering engineer
- Butch Vig – production

== Charts ==
Weekly chart performance for "Today"
Chart (1993–1994)	Peak position
Australia (ARIA)	57
Canada Top Singles (RPM)	82
Greece Indie (Pop & Rock)	6
New Zealand (Recorded Music NZ)	27
UK Singles (Official Charts)	44
US Radio Songs (Billboard)	56
US Bubbling Under Hot 100 (Billboard)	3
US Alternative Airplay (Billboard)	4
US Mainstream Rock Airplay (Billboard)	28

Weekly chart performance for "Today"
Chart (1997)	Peak position
Canada Singles Sales (The Record)	30

== Certifications ==
Certifications and sales for "Today"
Region	Certification	Certified units/sales
New Zealand (RMNZ)	Platinum	30,000^{‡}
United Kingdom (BPI)	Silver	200,000^{‡}
^{‡} Sales+streaming figures based on certification alone.

== Release history ==
Release dates and formats for "Today"
Region	Date	Format(s)	Label(s)	Ref.
United Kingdom	September 13, 1993	7-inch vinyl; 12-inch vinyl; CD; cassette	Hut; Virgin	
Australia	November 22, 1993	CD; cassette	Hut	
Japan	January 26, 1994	CD	Hut; Virgin	
