= I Am One =

1990 song by the Smashing Pumpkins

Single by the Smashing Pumpkins

from the album Gish
- B-side: "Not Worth Asking"; "Plume"; "Starla"; "Terrapin"; "Bullet Train to Osaka"
- Released: 1990 (Limited Potential); August 24, 1992 (Gish version)
- Genre: Alternative rock; grunge
- Length: 4:16 (Limited Potential); 4:07 (Gish version)
- Label: Limited Potential; Caroline; Hut
- Songwriters: Billy Corgan; James Iha
- Producers: Billy Corgan (Limited Potential); Billy Corgan, Butch Vig (Gish version)

The Smashing Pumpkins singles chronology
"I Am One" (1990)	"Tristessa" (1990)

Gish version
- 10-inch vinyl and CD cover

"I Am One" is the debut single by American alternative rock band the Smashing Pumpkins. It was the band's first ever release and it charted on the UK Singles Chart at a peak position of number 73.

Two recordings of the song were released. One was recorded in 1990 and was the Pumpkins' first release and first on Limited Potential. This recording was financed with the money from Corgan's college tuition fund left by his grandmother. "I Am One" was re-recorded for Gish and a new single was released on Caroline Records and Hut Recordings. Corgan later stated his regret with not re-working the song for Gish, as the two versions are nearly identical. A video for the song was also filmed, but never released (until 2001) due to the band being unhappy with the result. Footage from the video was instead used on the long form video, Vieuphoria. The long version of the music video was released on the Greatest Hits Video Collection.

With only 1500 copies pressed, the release is highly sought after by collectors. There are apparently three test pressings also in existence, two owned by Billy Corgan and one was formally owned by Limited Potential owner, Mike Potential.

"I Am One" features a doubled guitar solo – a technique later used on Pumpkins songs like "Ava Adore", "Tarantula", and "Bring the Light".

The music video features a live performance by the band.

== Performance ==
In live performances (starting around the release of Siamese Dream), Corgan would often improvise a speech during the extended bass break; as a result the song could extend to 8–10 minutes in length. The speech section is known among fans as "the I Am One rant". These rants were criticized, sometimes even by the other band members, due to their abrasive nature. Jimmy Chamberlin considered these rants to be "art-breakdown". The rants were apparently based around the erosion of the belief structure in America's youth, and Corgan has stated they were the gestation for many ideas he later explored on Mellon Collie and the Infinite Sadness. Some of the rants contained lyrics for future songs, most notably "Zero". The recording of "I Am One" on Vieuphoria / Earphoria features one such rant. When the band released their greatest hits compilation, Rotten Apples, in 2001, "I Am One" was one of the few singles that did not make the cut (the others were "Tristessa", "Rocket", "Thirty-Three", "The End Is the Beginning Is the End", and on American copies of the album, "Try, Try, Try").

== Track listing ==
US Limited Potential vinyl version
No.	Title	Writer(s)	Length
1.	"I Am One"	Billy Corgan, James Iha	4:16
2.	"Not Worth Asking"	Billy Corgan	4:00

Gish CD version and UK 7-inch and 12-inch vinyl releases
No.	Title	Writer(s)	Length
1.	"I Am One"	Billy Corgan, James Iha	4:07
2.	"Plume"	Billy Corgan, James Iha	3:37
3.	"Starla"	Billy Corgan	11:01

UK and Dutch 10-inch vinyl
No.	Title	Writer(s)	Length
1.	"I Am One"	Billy Corgan, James iha	4:07
2.	"Terrapin"	Syd Barrett	2:55
3.	"Bullet Train to Osaka"	Billy Corgan	4:16

== Single personnel ==
=== The Smashing Pumpkins ===
- Billy Corgan – vocals, guitar, production
- James Iha (as "James" on Limited Potential) – guitar, photography (Gish version)
- D'arcy Wretzky – bass guitar
- Jimmy Chamberlin – drums

=== Technical personnel ===
- Kerry Brown – production, CD single b-sides
- Butch Vig – production, Gish version
- Lynne Fischer – design, photography (Limited Potential)
