= Siva (song) =

1991 single by The Smashing Pumpkins

Single by The Smashing Pumpkins

from the album Gish
- B-side: "Window Paine"
- Released: August 19, 1991
- Recorded: 1991
- Genre: Grunge, alternative rock
- Length: 4:23
- Label: Caroline/Virgin
- Songwriter: Billy Corgan
- Producers: Butch Vig, Billy Corgan

The Smashing Pumpkins singles chronology
"Tristessa" (1990)	"Siva" (1991)	"Rhinoceros" (1991)

"Siva" is a song by American alternative rock band The Smashing Pumpkins. It was the first single released after their debut album Gish, and was written by Billy Corgan. "Siva" was also the first music video filmed by the band.

== Background ==
In an early interview with Billy Corgan, he admitted that he had thought of the name for the song before he had written it, had labeled dozens of tapes with its name, and even considered naming the band "Siva" instead of "Smashing Pumpkins". Corgan has stated the riff was conceived on an acoustic guitar while working at a record store in Chicago. The song was one of three played at the band's 1991 session with John Peel, released on Peel Sessions. The guitar solo in "Siva" is the band's first usage of the Big Muff pedal, which later would famously mark the band's alternative rock style on Siamese Dream.

Corgan originally titled the song "Shiva", referring to the Tantric concepts of Shiva and Shakti as opposing masculine and feminine forces, ignorant of any further implications of the name. Upon realizing that the name was more readily connected with the Hindu god Shiva, he removed the letter "h" from the title to lessen this association. Corgan considered "Siva" as the band's first real rock song that described their sound, leading him to believe that the Smashing Pumpkins were "going to work", later feeling that "Siva" is the most important song from the beginnings of the band. Though he considered making "Siva" the first song on Gish, he decided that "I Am One" was a stronger opener.

The song was only released as a single in the UK (on vinyl), New Zealand and Australia (on CD), as well as appearing on the Peel Sessions EP. On January 29, 2008, it was also made available as a downloadable track for the video game Rock Band.

== Track listing ==
All songs written by Billy Corgan.

No.	Title	Length
1.	"Siva"	4:20
2.	"Window Paine"	5:49

== Charts ==
Chart (1993)	Peak position
New Zealand (Recorded Music NZ)	45
