= Cherub Rock =

1993 single by the Smashing Pumpkins

Single by the Smashing Pumpkins

from the album Siamese Dream
- B-side: "Pissant"; "French Movie Theme" / "The Star-Spangled Banner"; "Purr Snickety"
- Released: June 21, 1993
- Genre: Grunge; alternative rock; hard rock
- Length: 4:58
- Label: Hut/Virgin
- Songwriter: Billy Corgan
- Producers: Butch Vig; Billy Corgan

The Smashing Pumpkins singles chronology
"Drown" (1992)	"Cherub Rock" (1993)	"Today" (1993)

Music video
- "Cherub Rock" on YouTube

"Cherub Rock" is a song by American alternative rock band the Smashing Pumpkins. It is the first single from their second album, Siamese Dream (1993) and is the opening track. It was written by lead vocalist and guitarist Billy Corgan. It was nominated for a Grammy Award for Best Hard Rock Performance.

== Composition ==
Cherub Rock
Sample of "Cherub Rock" from Siamese Dream, which features layers of guitar overdubs influenced by arena rock and shoegazing, as well as repeated use of "the Pumpkin chord".

"Cherub Rock" was one of the last songs written for the album, and the lyrics relate to Corgan's relationship with his perception of the indie rock community and larger media. The song was performed in standard tuning with an E octave played at the 7th fret, a technique that the band used on other songs, such as "Drown", "Tristessa", and "Starla". Corgan describes this as the "Pumpkin Chord", saying "We basically stole that from Jimi Hendrix. But Jimi Hendrix probably stole it from Wes Montgomery." The prominent effect on the solo was achieved by recording the guitar solo to two different tapes that were then run simultaneously, with the speed of one tape slightly altered. "Cherub Rock" contains various overdubs influenced by the genres of shoegazing as well as 1970s classic arena rock. According to Corgan, the song's introductory drum riff is a direct lift from Rush's 1975 song "By-Tor and the Snow Dog."

== Reception ==
Corgan insisted that the song be released as the first single from the album, though record executives believed that "Today" would be a stronger opening single. Although Corgan's wishes were honored, the single was indeed received much less enthusiastically than "Today", although it remains a fan favorite. An acoustic version of the song is performed on Vieuphoria and its CD companion, Earphoria.

The song was a moderate success for the band, being performed on Saturday Night Live on October 30, 1993 and making it to the Triple J Hottest 100 at number 43. Readers ranked "Cherub Rock" at number 97 in Guitar World's list of the 100 greatest guitar solos of all time. In March 2005, Q magazine placed it at number 67 in its list of the 100 Greatest Guitar Tracks.

Following the 2011 re-issue of Siamese Dream, Consequence of Sound commented that the single "seemed tailor-made to feed the emerging modern rock radio format."

== Music video ==
The video features footage of the band performing the song live in a forest setting. It was shot outside San Francisco entirely on Super8 film on a modest budget. The director, Kevin Kerslake, employed various destructive techniques when developing the film to give the video a broken and dirty look. Corgan was reportedly extremely unhappy with the shooting experience, and the band never worked with Kerslake again until the video for ‘Empires’, the third single from the 2023 album Atum: A Rock Opera in Three Acts.

The video received its world premiere on MTV's late-night alternative rock program 120 Minutes on July 11, 1993.

== In popular culture ==
The song features on numerous rhythm video games such as Guitar Hero III: Legends of Rock, Rock Band, Power Gig: Rise of the SixString and Rocksmith 2014. It also appears in the final moments of "In Space, No One...", the fifth episode of the FX television series Alien: Earth.

Roses Are Red covered the song for Reignition Records' 2005 compilation The Killer in You: A Tribute to Smashing Pumpkins. Both Carpenter Brut and Bones UK covered the song for 2026's Sending Hearts To All My Dearies: A Tribute To The Smashing Pumpkins.

"Cherub Rock" was sampled in hip-hop group HXG's song "5G".

== Track listings ==
All songs were written by Billy Corgan.

CD and 12-inch vinyl

1. "Cherub Rock" – 4:59
2. "Pissant" – 2:30
3. "French Movie Theme" / "Star-Spangled Banner" – 3:50

7-inch vinyl (5000 copies only)

1. "Cherub Rock" – 4:59
2. "Purr Snickety" – 2:50

== Personnel ==
- Billy Corgan – vocals, lead guitar, bass (recording session), production
- James Iha – rhythm guitar
- D'arcy Wretzky – bass (credited), vocals
- Jimmy Chamberlin – drums

== Charts ==
=== Weekly charts ===
Weekly chart performance for "Cherub Rock"
Chart (1993)	Peak position
Australia (ARIA)	87
Canada Top Singles (RPM)	91
Greece Indie (Pop & Rock)	1
New Zealand (Recorded Music NZ)	16
UK Singles (Official Charts)	31
UK Indie (Music Week)	1
US Alternative Airplay (Billboard)	7
US Mainstream Rock (Billboard)	23

Weekly chart performance for "Cherub Rock"
Chart (1997)	Peak position
Canada Singles Sales (The Record)	24

=== Year-end charts ===
Year-end chart performance for "Cherub Rock"
Chart (1993)	Position
US Modern Rock Tracks (Billboard)	24

== Certifications ==
Certifications and sales for "Cherub Rock"
Region	Certification	Certified units/sales
New Zealand (RMNZ)	Gold	15,000^{‡}
^{‡} Sales+streaming figures based on certification alone.

== Release history ==
Release dates and formats for "Cherub Rock"
Region	Date	Format(s)	Label(s)	Ref.
United Kingdom	June 21, 1993	7-inch vinyl; 12-inch vinyl; CD	Hut	
Australia	August 23, 1993	CD	Hut	
