= Look to the Sky =

Studio album by James Iha
- Released: 14 March 2012
- Recorded: 2010–2011
- Genre: Alternative rock
- Length: 49:12
- Labels: The End; EMI Music Japan
- Producers: James Iha; Nathan Larson

James Iha chronology
| Let It Come Down (1998) | Look to the Sky (2012) |

Look to the Sky is the second solo album of James Iha, guitarist of The Smashing Pumpkins and A Perfect Circle. It was released on 14 March 2012 in Japan, with a worldwide release in September 2012. The album has many collaborations, including Karen O and Nick Zinner (Yeah Yeah Yeahs), Sara Quin (Tegan and Sara), Nathan Larson (Shudder To Think), Nina Persson (The Cardigans), Tom Verlaine (Television) and Mike Garson.

== Release ==
Look to the Sky was released on 18 September 2012 in the US and 24 September 2012 in the UK, with "To Who Knows Where" acting as the lead single supporting the album release. Due to the album's prior Japanese release date in March, it is noted that the track listing has been amended to accommodate an international UK/US release.

== Critical reception ==
Professional ratings
Aggregate scores
| Source | Rating |
|---|---|
| Metacritic | 54/100 |
Review scores
| Source | Rating |
| AllMusic | 4/5 stars |
| Chicago Sun-Times | 3/4 stars |
| DIY | 5/10 |
| Mojo | 4/5 stars |
| NME | 6/10 |
| Pitchfork | 2.9/10 |
| PopMatters | 8/10 |
| Seattle Post-Intelligencer | 3.5/5 stars |

The album received mixed reviews from music critics. On Metacritic, which assigns a normalized rating out of 100 to reviews from mainstream critics, the album received an average score of 54, based on 9 reviews, which indicates "mixed or average reviews".

AllMusic critic Matt Collar gave a positive review, writing: "If Let It Come Down was Iha's sun-dappled West Coast folk rock break from the creative turmoil and personal squabbles of the Pumpkins, then Look to the Sky is his more austere, if no less captivating, look back from the sun and toward the dark moon of his alt rock '90s past." Chicago Sun-Times' Thomas Conner thought that "Iha shows up with this well-written, beautifully played set as a gentle reminder of his talent." Mojo critic Fred Dellar thought that on the album, Iha "shaped some additional, more diverse sounds" while retaining the melodic approach of his debut. Enio Chiola of PopMatters described the album as a "beautiful and calming record". Seattle Post-Intelligencer reviewer Charlie Doherty stated that "this new effort sees the ex-Pumpkin guitarist branch out and take in a myriad of other influences."

DIY critic Martyn Young regarded the album as "a something of a missed opportunity" and "a largely uninspiring record that preaches very much to the converted." Tom Howard of NME thought the album was "intriguing, but unsatisfying", while Pitchfork's Ian Cohen criticized the album, describing the tracks as "bafflingly outdated alternative rock songs that could comfortably sidle between choice cuts from Marcy Playground and Semisonic and get their asses handed to them." Kerrang! wrote: "He goes from pretty ditties to outright tedium as songs drag on interminably and eventually, unlistenably."

== Track listing ==
Japanese release

All tracks are written by James Iha, except where noted.

| No. | Title | Writer(s) | Length |
|---|---|---|---|
| 1. | "Make Believe" | | 2:43 |
| 2. | "Summer Days" | Iha, Nathan Larson | 3:35 |
| 3. | "To Who Knows Where" | | 4:18 |
| 4. | "Till Next Tuesday" | Iha, Vanessa Quinones, Andreas Mattsson, Niclas Frisk | 3:49 |
| 5. | "Dream Tonight" | | 3:14 |
| 6. | "Dark Star" | Iha, Nathan Larson | 4:55 |
| 7. | "Appetite" | | 4:11 |
| 8. | "Gemini" | | 3:53 |
| 9. | "Waves" | | 3:38 |
| 10. | "Speed of Love" | Iha, Niclas Frisk | 3:44 |
| 11. | "4th of July" | | 3:40 |
| 12. | "A String of Words" | | 3:56 |

Japanese edition bonus tracks
| No. | Title | Writer(s) | Length |
|---|---|---|---|
| 13. | "Diamond Eyes" | | 3:56 |
| 14. | "Stay Lost" | Iha, Mira Billotte | 3:34 |

International Release

| No. | Title | Writer(s) | Length |
|---|---|---|---|
| 1. | "Make Believe" | | 2:43 |
| 2. | "To Who Knows Where" | | 4:18 |
| 3. | "Gemini" | | 3:53 |
| 4. | "Speed of Love" | Iha, Niclas Frisk | 3:44 |
| 5. | "Till Next Tuesday" | Iha, Vanessa Quinones, Andreas Mattsson, Niclas Frisk | 3:14 |
| 6. | "Summer Days" | Iha, Nathan Larson | 4:55 |
| 7. | "Appetite" | | 4:11 |
| 8. | "Dream Tonight" | | 3:53 |
| 9. | "New Year's Day" | | 3:38 |
| 10. | "Waves" | | 3:38 |
| 11. | "A String of Words" | | 3:56 |

International edition CD bonus tracks
| No. | Title | Writer(s) | Length |
|---|---|---|---|
| 12. | "4th of July" | | 3:40 |
| 13. | "Dark Star" | Iha, Nathan Larson | 4:55 |

Commentary version

| No. | Title | Writer(s) | Length |
|---|---|---|---|
| 1. | "Make Believe" | | 1:44 |
| 2. | "To Who Knows Where" | | 1:43 |
| 3. | "Gemini" | | 1:48 |
| 4. | "Speed of Love" | Iha, Niclas Frisk | 1:20 |
| 5. | "Till Next Tuesday" | Iha, Vanessa Quinones, Andreas Mattsson, Niclas Frisk | 1:03 |
| 6. | "Summer Days" | Iha, Nathan Larson | 1:13 |
| 7. | "Appetite" | | 2:54 |
| 8. | "Dream Tonight" | | 1:17 |
| 9. | "New Year's Day" | | 1:20 |
| 10. | "Waves" | | 2:06 |
| 11. | "A String of Words" | | 1:25 |
| 12. | "4th of July" | | 0:53 |
| 13. | "Dark Star" | Iha, Nathan Larson | 1:41 |

== Personnel ==
- James Iha – vocals, acoustic and electric guitars, bass, piano, synth, glockenspiel, treatments, producer, string arrangements
- Nathan Larson – guitar, bass, synth, treatments (tracks 1, 6, 7, 11, 13) and "New Year's Day", string arrangements (tracks 1, 5, 12), horn arrangements (tracks 5, 7)
- Kevin March – drums on "To Who Knows Where", "Till Next Tuesday", "Gemini", "4th Of July", "A String Of Words" and "Stay Lost"
- Tom Verlaine – guitars on "Till Next Tuesday" and "Appetite"
- Sara Quin – vocals on "To Who Knows Where" and "Dream Tonight"
- Josh Lattanzi – guitars, harmony vocals on "Dream Tonight" and "Diamond Eyes"
- Nina Persson – vocals on "Make Believe" and "Till Next Tuesday"
- Nick Zinner – guitar on "Dream Tonight"
- Adam Schlesinger – bass on "Speed Of Love"
- Karen O – vocals on "Waves"
- Mike Garson – piano on "Appetite"
- Niclas Frisk – guitars on "Till Next Tuesday" and "Speed Of Love"
- Andreas Mattsson – vocals, strings on "Till Next Tuesday"
- Arjun Agerwala – vocals on "4th Of July" and "New Year's Day"
- Jon Graboff – pedal steel on "Dark Star", "4th Of July" and "Diamond Eyes"
- Geoff Sanoff – bass on "Till Next Tuesday"
- Alexis Fleisig – drums on "Speed Of Love"
- Neal Casal – vocals on "To Who Knows Where", "Till Next Tuesday" and "Speed Of Love"
- Kelly Pratt and Jon Natchez – horns, woodwinds on "Dream Tonight" and "Appetite"
- Maxim Moston – violins on "Dream Tonight", "4th Of July", "A String Of Words" and "Diamond Eyes"
- Julia Kent – cello on "Dream Tonight", "4th Of July", "A String Of Words" and "Diamond Eyes"
- Tim Byrnes – trumpet on "A String Of Words"

=== Production ===
- Produced By James Iha & Nathan Larson
- Engineered By Arjun Agerwala, Geoff Sanoff, Rudyard Lee Cullers, Michael Nesci, Adam Tilzer
- Assistant Engineered by Atsuo Matsumoto
- Mixed By John Holbrook (tracks 1, 6, 14), Geoff Sanoff (tracks 2, 4, 5, 7, 9, 11), Arjun Agerwala (tracks 3, 8, 10, 12, 13)
- Mastered By Joe LaPorta

=== Additional personnel ===
- Illustrations by Leanne Shapton
- Art Direction by Triboro
- B&W Artist Photography by Tyler Udall
- Color Artist Photography by Aliya Naumoff
- Landscape Photography by James Iha

== Release history ==
| Region | Date | Label |
|---|---|---|
| Japan | March 14, 2012 | EMI Music Japan |
| United States | September 18, 2012 | The End |
