= Let It Come Down (James Iha album) =

Studio album by James Iha
- Released: February 10, 1998
- Recorded: 1997
- Genre: Alternative rock
- Length: 40:16
- Label: Hut; Virgin
- Producer: Jim Scott; James Iha

James Iha chronology
Let It Come Down (1998)	Look to the Sky (2012)

Let It Come Down is the first solo album by American guitarist James Iha. It was released in 1998, during which Iha was still with the Smashing Pumpkins, before the release of Adore. Iha took on a more acoustic country sound reminiscent of the songs he contributed to the Pumpkins, notably shying away from the darker sound of Billy Corgan's songwriting.

Iha had said that the quieter tone of the songs reflected the fact that many of them were written in his hotel rooms during the Smashing Pumpkins tours, and he did not want to disturb other guests by playing too loudly.

"Be Strong Now" was released as a 4-track single, featuring the bonus studio tracks "Falling", "My Advice" and "Take Care", and as a two-track promo single where the other track is a 12-second call out hook. Both versions of the "Be Strong Now" single feature the same cover. The song "Jealousy" was released as a promo single, without any B-sides.

The album was remastered and re-issued in February 2012 with the three tracks previously released as B-sides added as bonus tracks.

== Critical reception ==
Professional ratings
Review scores
Source	Rating
AllMusic	4/5 stars
Entertainment Weekly	C+
Pitchfork	4.9/10
Rolling Stone	2/5 stars

The Guardian wrote that "Iha has regressed to a state of wistful, whimsical child-likeness... Sample sparingly and you can float away on reveries of psychedelic summer afternoons."

== Track listing ==
All tracks are written by James Iha.

No.	Title	Length
1.	"Be Strong Now"	2:48
2.	"Sound of Love"	3:56
3.	"Beauty"	3:44
4.	"See the Sun"	3:59
5.	"Country Girl"	3:01
6.	"Jealousy"	3:26
7.	"Lover, Lover"	3:21
8.	"Silver String"	3:53
9.	"Winter"	4:25
10.	"One and Two"	3:31
11.	"No One's Gonna Hurt You"	4:12

Japanese bonus track
No.	Title	Length
12.	"My Advice"	3:15

2012 remaster
No.	Title	Length
12.	"My Advice"	3:37
13.	"Take Care"	2:30
14.	"Falling"	3:56

== Personnel ==
- James Iha – vocals, acoustic and electric guitars, bass, producer, string arrangements, production
- Neal Casal – harmony vocal, electric guitar
- Greg Leisz – pedal steel, lap steel and electric guitars, bass on "Lover, Lover"
- Adam Schlesinger – piano, bass on "Country Girl"
- Solomon Snyder – bass
- John Ginty – Hammond organ, piano
- Matt Walker – drums, percussion
- Curt Bisquera – percussion
- Eric Remschneider – cello, string arrangement
- James Sanders – violin
- Stacia Spencer – violin on "Silver String"
- Jim Goodwin – saxophone on "Jealousy"
- Ralph Rickert – trumpet on "Jealousy"
- D'arcy Wretzky – harmony vocal on "One and Two"
- Nina Gordon – harmony vocal on "Beauty"
- Tonya Lamm and Shawn Barton – harmony vocal on "No One's Gonna Hurt You" and "Country Girl"

Additional personnel

- Dave Menet – guitar tech
- Russ Spice – equipment
- Chris Billheimer – art direction
- Jeremy Goldberg – cover photograph
- Anette Aurell – back photograph
- James Iha, Kevin Wells, Larry Hirshowitz – collage photographs
- Lou Kregel, Patti West – illustrators
- Todd Tatnall – Pro Tools editing

Production

- Jim Scott – production, mixing, engineering
- Scott Humphrey – post-production
- Podboy – post-production
- Flood – post-production on "One and Two"
- Steve Spapperi – additional engineering
- Mike Scotella – mix assistance
- Stephen Marcussen – mastering

== Charts ==
Chart performance for Let It Come Down
Chart (1998)	Peak position
Swedish Albums (Sverigetopplistan)	53
UK Albums (OCC)	76
US Billboard 200	171
