= Mayonaise (song) =

1993 song by the Smashing Pumpkins

Single by the Smashing Pumpkins

from the album Siamese Dream
- Released: November 20, 2023
- Recorded: 1992 – 1993
- Genre: Shoegaze; grunge
- Length: 5:49
- Label: Capitol Records
- Songwriter: Billy Corgan · James Iha
- Producer: Butch Vig · Billy Corgan

The Smashing Pumpkins singles chronology
"Empires" (2023)	"Mayonaise" (2023)	"Sighommi" (2024)

"Mayonaise" is a song by American alternative rock band the Smashing Pumpkins. It was first made available in 1993 on the band's second studio album Siamese Dream as the ninth track. It was subsequently released as the album's fifth single on November 20, 2023 through Capitol Records as part of the Siamese Dream 30th Anniversary celebrations and shows. The song was produced by Butch Vig and Billy Corgan.

In 2012, Rolling Stone readers voted "Mayonaise" as their favorite song in the band's catalogue. In 2021, Kerrang ranked the song as the band's fourth best.

In April 2023, the Netflix series Beef featured the song in the final scene of the final episode "Figures of Light", sending the song to the #5 position on the Billboard LyricFind Global and US charts.

== Composition ==
Written by Corgan and Iha, "Mayonaise" was recorded from December 1992 to March 1993 at Triclops Sound Studios. According to Corgan, the whistling sound (feedback) heard in "Mayonaise" came from a cheap guitar he bought, which, whenever he stopped playing it, created the whistling sound. This sound was then incorporated into the song. Corgan apparently got the title for the song after he looked "in [his] refrigerator".

While appearing on the podcast Reinvented with Jen Eckhart on 20 October 2022, Billy Corgan admitted that previous explanations for the song title were inside jokes and disclosed the true story. The band visited Japan in 1992 while touring Gish and noticed that the record company had mistranslated a lyric from Gish into a fan booklet as "mayonnaise seas". The band thought this mondegreen was funny and used "Mayonaise" [sic] as a temporary song title when recording Siamese Dream and it eventually stuck.

While appearing on Q101's Brian and Kenzie Show on 4 July 2023, Billy Corgan specified that the mondegreen cited above was from a lyric on the song "Rhinoceros".

== Reception ==
Despite having garnered considerable radio play and remaining a fan favorite, "Mayonaise" was never an officially released single, until November 20th, 2023 as a limited maxi single celebrating the album's 30th anniversary, which contains the album version and as a B-side, the live acoustic version from Vieuphoria. In 2012 it won a Rolling Stone readers poll for "The Best Smashing Pumpkins Songs" by "a significant margin".

== Formats and track listings ==
All tracks are written by Billy Corgan and James Iha.

Versions:
No.	Title	Length
1.	"Mayonaise" (Studio Version/Siamese Dream)	5:49
2.	"Mayonaise" (Live Acoustic/Vieuphoria)	4:20
3.	"Mayonaise" (Studio acoustic ('Still Becoming Apart' EP))	4:32

== Personnel ==
The Smashing Pumpkins

- Billy Corgan – lead vocals, guitars, bass guitar, production, mixing
- James Iha – guitars, backing vocals
- D'arcy Wretzky – bass guitar, backing vocals
- Jimmy Chamberlin – drums

Technical staff

- Butch Vig – production, engineering, mixing
- Jeff Tomei – engineering
- Tim Holbrook – special technical engineering
- Alan Moulder – mixing
- Howie Weinberg – mastering
- Melodie McDaniel – sleeve photography
- Bob Ludwig – mastering (2011 remaster)

== Release history ==
Region	Date	Format	Label	Catalogue no.
Various
Various	20 November 2023	12-inch single	Capitol Records	MMLP-A007
