= Siamese Dream =

Studio album by the Smashing Pumpkins
- Released: July 19, 1993
- Recorded: December 1992 – March 1993
- Studio: Triclops (Marietta, Georgia)
- Genres: Alternative rock; grunge; alternative metal; indie rock; hard rock
- Length: 62:08
- Label: Virgin
- Producers: Butch Vig; Billy Corgan

The Smashing Pumpkins chronology
Peel Sessions (1992)	Siamese Dream (1993)	Pisces Iscariot (1994)

Singles from Siamese Dream
- 1. "Cherub Rock" Released: June 21, 1993; 2. "Today" Released: September 13, 1993; 3. "Disarm" Released: February 21, 1994; 4. "Rocket" Released: December 27, 1994

Alternate cover
- 2011 reissue cover

Siamese Dream is the second studio album by the American alternative rock band the Smashing Pumpkins, first released on July 19, 1993 (Note: At least in the UK; it was released later on July 27, 1993 in the US.) by Virgin Records. The album was produced by Butch Vig and frontman Billy Corgan. Despite its recording sessions being fraught with difficulties and tensions, Siamese Dream debuted at number ten on the Billboard 200, and was eventually certified 7× Platinum by the Recording Industry Association of America (RIAA), with the album selling over six million copies worldwide, catapulting the Smashing Pumpkins to mainstream success and cementing them as a significant group in alternative music.

Four singles were released in support of Siamese Dream: "Cherub Rock", "Today", "Disarm", and "Rocket", and a fifth single, "Mayonaise", was released in 2023 for the album's 30th anniversary. The album received widespread acclaim from critics and audiences alike, with its diverse musical influences and lyrical material considered unique compared to other releases during the alternative rock and grunge movements of its time. The album has since been considered "one of the finest alternative rock albums", and is widely regarded as one of the greatest albums of the 1990s and of all time.

== Background ==
The band's debut album, Gish, was released on Caroline Records in 1991 to unexpected success and acclaim. After the release of Nirvana's Nevermind later that year, the Smashing Pumpkins were hyped as "the next Nirvana". The band was signed to Caroline Records parent Virgin Records and began recording a follow-up album. Frontman Billy Corgan felt "this great pressure to make the next album to set the world on fire". The immense pressure to succeed intensified an already problematic situation: drummer Jimmy Chamberlin was addicted to heroin, guitarist James Iha and bassist D'arcy Wretzky had recently ended their romantic relationship, and Corgan, aside from battles with weight gain and suicidal depression, was struggling with writer's block. After he suffered a nervous breakdown, Corgan began visiting a therapist. Consequently, his lyrics became more explicit about his troubled past and his insecurities.

== Recording and production ==
Siamese Dream was recorded mainly between December 1992 and March 1993. The band relocated to Triclops Studios in Marietta, Georgia for the album sessions, so they could avoid local friends and distractions, and to cut Chamberlin off from his known drug connections. Butch Vig reprised his role as producer after working on their debut album Gish. Butch Vig stated "Billy [Corgan] and I raised the bar really high. We wanted to make a very ambitious sounding record. It was all done on analogue tape so it was time consuming. We were working 12 hours a day, six times a week for about three months, and for the last two months we worked seven days a week, 14 or 15 hours a day because we were behind schedule."

"Today" was one of the first songs written by Corgan for Siamese Dream. He played the self-recorded demo to Vig, and received a positive reaction. Soon afterward, executives from Virgin Records came to observe the band after hearing about their problems, but were pleased with the demo and did not soon return to the studio. The reaction from the executives only served to put more stress on Corgan. Corgan worked overtime, practically living in the studio for the recording of Siamese Dream—he and Vig would sometimes work on a 45-second section of music for two days, working 16-hour days for weeks at a time to achieve the sound Corgan wanted.

Corgan's desire for musical perfection put further strain on the already-frayed relationships between the band members. Vig later recalled, "D'arcy would lock herself in the bathroom, James wouldn't say anything, or Billy would lock himself in the control room". Corgan often overdubbed Iha's and Wretzky's parts with his own playing. Wretzky stated that Corgan only performed most of the guitar and bass parts because he could lay them down more easily in recording and with far fewer takes. Stories of the album's recording had circulated in the music press. Corgan admitted there was some truth to accusations of tyrannical behavior, though he felt the press misunderstood the situation.

While Chamberlin performed all drum parts on the album, he would disappear for days on drug benders that caused everyone to fear for his life. After one incident where the drummer had disappeared for two or three days, Corgan "put the hammer down", according to Vig, and had Chamberlin perform the drum part for "Cherub Rock" until his hands bled. Due to Corgan's urging, Chamberlin checked into a rehab clinic. Corgan told Spin later that year, "You know, I gave them a year and a half to prepare for this record... I'm surrounded by these people who I care about very much, yet they continue to keep failing me." Corgan explained that he began to take the actions of others personally; he said, "If you really think about it, of course, someone doesn't do the job because they're lazy, or they don't think it's important. But I took it as, 'You're not worth going home and working on the song.'"

Meanwhile, Corgan was also going through his own problems. He would admit in 2011 that throughout the recording process he had been planning his own suicide. Stating that he had gotten rid of most of his things and was "fantasizing about my own death, I started thinking what my funeral would be like and what music would be played."

Virgin began to grow impatient with the album's recording as it went over budget and became behind schedule. The band, however, would not let the label cut corners if it meant compromising the sound. By the time recording was completed, Corgan and Vig felt too emotionally exhausted to mix the record. Corgan suggested that engineer Alan Moulder mix the album, due to his work on Loveless by My Bloody Valentine. Moulder booked two weeks in a studio to mix the album; the mix ended up taking 36 days to complete. Eventually, the album was finished after four months and $250,000 over budget.

== Composition and lyrics ==
"Today"
A 20-second sample of "Today" from the Smashing Pumpkins' 1993 album, Siamese Dream. This sample illustrates the song's dynamic changes when it moves from the refrain to the first verse.

"Disarm"
Corgan would sing about his depression throughout the album and "Disarm" would be the clearest example of this.

The album boasts relatively high production values and ornate arrangements compared to other early-1990s alternative albums. Vig said, "Billy wanted to make a record that people would put on and say, 'What the fuck was that?' [...] We wanted to have things going on in the left ear and right ear all the time". One of Corgan's main goals was to create a sense of sonic depth, but, as Corgan said, "without necessarily using delays or reverbs—to use tonalities instead." For the album, the guitars were layered multiple times. Corgan has stated that "Soma" alone contains up to 40 overdubbed guitar parts. Vig stated that as many as 100 guitar parts were compressed into a single song.

Musically, Siamese Dream has been described as an alternative rock, grunge, alternative metal, indie rock, and hard rock album. According to Rolling Stone, the album was "closer to progressive rock than to punk or grunge."

The subjects of Corgan's lyrics on Siamese Dream varied. Corgan noted that most of his lyrics for the album were about his girlfriend and future ex-wife Chris Fabian, with whom he had briefly broken up at the time he wrote the songs. Corgan occasionally wrote about other subjects. In "Cherub Rock", the album's opening track, Corgan attacked the American music industry, and "Today" is about a day that he was experiencing depression and suicidal thoughts. "Spaceboy" was written as a tribute to his half-brother, Jesse.

== Artwork and packaging ==
The cover art for Siamese Dream features two young girls embracing while wearing dresses and fairy wings. Despite the album name leading to speculation that the girls were conjoined twins, or at least related, they were in fact California-based child models Ali Laenger and Lysandra Roberts, who had not met before. This information was not shared at the time, however, and their identities were a mystery in the following years. Laenger later described the photo shoot as "the ultimate childhood dream day" and said she and Roberts spent the shoot eating Lemonheads and rocket popsicles.

The artwork for the album was initially going to be created by an outsider artist, but after a series of disagreements with the label, Corgan was forced to step in at the last minute. The album booklet, composed of old photographs of both strangers and Corgan's family members with lyrics handwritten on top, was assembled by Corgan and his wife the day after their wedding. Corgan was not satisfied with the results. The first pressing of the CD contained a 20-page booklet, with a separate page devoted to each song's lyrics and accompanying photograph; later pressings contained a four-panel fold-out liner with thumbnails of each picture. In 1999, Virgin Records reissued the album with the original 20-page booklet.

Shortly after the Pumpkins reformed in 2007, Corgan posted a message to the band's blog saying that they were "[l]ooking for girls from Siamese Dream album cover... As you all know, they were quite young when the photo was taken. They are not conjoined anymore, as far as we know." The band's intentions for the search were never made clear. In February 2011, Corgan announced via Twitter that not only had one of the girls been found, she was the current bassist for the Pumpkins, Nicole Fiorentino. According to Corgan, "Just found out the weirdest news: our bass player Nicole just admitted she is one of the girls on the cover of Siamese Dream." However, according to the assistant photographer for Siamese Dream, the cover photo was probably shot specifically for the album. Given Fiorentino's age at the time of the album, this would make her too old to be on the cover of the album. Laenger and Roberts were reunited in 2018 for a video announcing the Smashing Pumpkins' Shiny and Oh So Bright Tour.

The album was also released as a shaped wooden box set (aka Siamese Dream Collectors Edition) with metal hinges, limited to only 1,000 copies and containing the UK HUT CD album housed in a recess with individually numbered silver metal embossed plate at the side and a 20-page booklet housed in a similar recess in the lid. Though the CD itself and the booklet are official and genuine, the wooden box is not an official Virgin (US) or HUT (UK) release.

== Release and reception ==
=== Contemporary reviews ===
Contemporary professional ratings
Contemporary reviews
Review scores
Source	Rating
Entertainment Weekly	B
NME	8/10
Rolling Stone	3.5/5 stars
Select	5/5 medals
Q	4/5 stars
Kerrang!	4/5
Vox	9/10

Siamese Dream was released in the United States on July 27, 1993, and debuted at number ten on the Billboard 200 the following week. The album was almost universally lauded by music critics. Select's Andrew Perry praised it as "the most grand-scale, expansively-passionate blasts of music you'll hear this year" and remarked that it would be "hard for anyone to top this one". John Harris of NME wrote that Siamese Dream, "for all its air of non-committal blankness and exercise-book psychoanalysis, is a startling, deeply satisfying record". Steve Hochman of the Los Angeles Times predicted that "the scale of its success will likely be tied to how many fans are willing to stop moshing and enter into some rather contemplative, even tender territory", and wrote that "the songs tend to drift in places, and some get a bit long-winded, but the overall balance between the harsh and the sweet makes for a strong and distinctive package". Lorraine Ali of Rolling Stone called the album "a strong, multidimensional extension of Gish that confirms that Smashing Pumpkins are neither sellouts nor one-offs."

Entertainment Weekly critic David Browne praised the band for living up to industry expectations of being the "next Nirvana" and compared Siamese Dream favorably to Nirvana's Nevermind, concluding: "In aiming for more than just another alternative guitar record, Smashing Pumpkins may have stumbled upon a whole new stance: slackers with a vision." Critic Simon Reynolds disagreed; he wrote in his review for The New York Times that "fuzzed-up riffs and angst-wracked vocals are quite the norm these days, and Smashing Pumpkins lacks the zeitgeist-defining edge that made Nirvana's breakthrough so thrilling and resonant." Robert Christgau of The Village Voice cited "Geek U.S.A." and "Today" as highlights while noting the record's strength is "the sonics"; he later rated the album with a three-star honorable mention. Siamese Dream earned the Smashing Pumpkins their first Grammy Award nominations. The album was nominated for the Grammy Award for Best Alternative Music Performance, and the group was nominated for Best Hard Rock Performance with Vocal at the 36th Annual Grammy Awards.

=== Retrospective reappraisal ===
Retrospective professional ratings
Retrospective reviews
Aggregate scores
Source	Rating
Metacritic	96/100
Review scores
Source	Rating
AllMusic	5/5 stars
The A.V. Club	A
Chicago Tribune	4/4 stars
Christgau's Consumer Guide	(3-star Honorable Mention)
Encyclopedia of Popular Music	5/5 stars
Pitchfork	10/10 (2011); 9.1/10 (2023)
PopMatters	10/10
Q	5/5 stars
Spin Alternative Record Guide	10/10
Slant	5/5 stars

Siamese Dream continues to receive critical praise and has been frequently included in lists of the best albums of the 1990s—the Alternative Press ranked it fourth, Pitchfork ranked it 18th, and Spin ranked it 23rd. In 2003, the album was ranked number 360 on Rolling Stone's list of "500 Greatest Albums of All Time", with the album's ranking dropping to number 362 and rising to number 341 in the 2012 and 2020 updates of the list, respectively. In a retrospective review of the album, Greg Prato of AllMusic called Siamese Dream "one of the finest alt-rock albums of all time" and remarked that it "stands alongside Nevermind and Superunknown as one of the decade's finest (and most influential) rock albums."

Chicago Tribune critic Greg Kot wrote that it "became a soundtrack for a significant portion of [Corgan's] generation" and "did so by tempering some of the first album's extremes; sticky melodies and pretty production can make almost anything radio-friendly, even a desperately sad song like 'Today.'" In a review for Pitchfork, Ned Raggett remarked that while initial reviews of the album singled out Corgan's lyrics for criticism, they were actually "exactly what made the band click even further", commending Corgan's "ear for hooks, metaphors, and deft summaries." The deluxe edition of the album holds a score of 96 out of 100 on review aggregate site Metacritic, indicating "universal acclaim". In April 2019, Rolling Stone ranked Siamese Dream as the 12th greatest grunge album of all time. The album was also included in the book 1001 Albums You Must Hear Before You Die.

== Track listing ==
All tracks are written by Billy Corgan, except where noted.

No.	Title	Writer(s)	Length
1.	"Cherub Rock"		4:58
2.	"Quiet"		3:41
3.	"Today"		3:19
4.	"Hummer"		6:57
5.	"Rocket"		4:06
6.	"Disarm"		3:17
7.	"Soma"	Corgan; James Iha	6:39
8.	"Geek U.S.A."		5:13
9.	"Mayonaise"	Corgan; Iha	5:49
10.	"Spaceboy"		4:28
11.	"Silverfuck"		8:43
12.	"Sweet Sweet"		1:38
13.	"Luna"		3:20
Total length:			62:08

Japanese edition bonus track
No.	Title	Length
14.	"Pissant" (labelled as "Hikari Express")	2:31

=== Reissue bonus material ===
2011 reissue bonus CD – Lollipop Fun Time
No.	Title	Writer(s)	Length
1.	"Pissant (Rough Mix)" (Spring 1993)		2:32
2.	"Siamese Dream (Broadway Rehearsal Demo)" (1992)		6:18
3.	"STP (Rehearsal Demo)" (1991)		3:28
4.	"Frail and Bedazzled (Soundworks Demo)" (Spring 1992)		3:42
5.	"Luna (Apartment Demo)" (1991)		3:12
6.	"Quiet (BBC Session/Billy Corgan Mix)" (12 September 1993)		3:36
7.	"Moleasskiss (Soundworks Demo)" (Spring 1992)		3:59
8.	"Hello Kitty Kat (Soundworks Demo)" (Spring 1992)		6:14
9.	"Today (Broadway Rehearsal Demo)" (1992)		3:21
10.	"Never Let Me Down Again (BBC Session) (Depeche Mode cover)" (12 September 1993)	Martin Gore	4:03
11.	"Apathy's Last Kiss (Siamese Sessions Rough Mix)" (Spring 1993)		2:40
12.	"Ache (Silverfuck Rehearsal Demo)" (1991)		6:57
13.	"U.S.A. (Soundworks Demo)" (Spring 1992)		4:25
14.	"U.S.S.R. (Soundworks Demo)" (Spring 1992)		1:35
15.	"Spaceboy (Acoustic Mix)" (December 1992 – March 1993)		3:57
16.	"Rocket (Rehearsal Demo)" (1991)		4:55
17.	"Disarm (Acoustic Mix)" (December 1992 – March 1993)		3:18
18.	"Soma (Instrumental Mix)" (December 1992 – March 1993)	Corgan; Iha	6:38

2011 reissue bonus DVD – Live at the Metro (Live on August 14, 1993)
No.	Title	Writer(s)	Length
1.	"Rocket"		4:19
2.	"Quiet"		3:39
3.	"Today"		3:39
4.	"Rhinoceros"		5:06
5.	"Geek U.S.A."		5:21
6.	"Soma"	Corgan; Iha	7:21
7.	"I Am One"	Corgan; Iha	4:47
8.	"Disarm"		3:55
9.	"Spaceboy"		4:48
10.	"Starla"		9:25
11.	"Cherub Rock"		5:01
12.	"Bury Me"		4:28
13.	"Hummer"		8:42
14.	"Siva"		8:35
15.	"Mayonaise"	Corgan; Iha	10:29
16.	"Drown"		8:24
17.	"Silverfuck"		13:30

== Personnel ==
=== The Smashing Pumpkins ===
- Billy Corgan – lead vocals, guitars, bass guitar, Mellotron on "Spaceboy", string arrangements, production, mixing
- James Iha – guitars
- D'arcy Wretzky – bass guitar, backing vocals
- Jimmy Chamberlin – drums

=== Additional personnel ===
- Mike Mills – piano on "Soma"
- Eric Remschneider – string arrangements and cello on "Disarm" and "Luna"
- David Ragsdale – string arrangements and violin on "Disarm" and "Luna"

=== Technical ===
- Butch Vig – production, engineering, mixing, string arrangements
- Jeff Tomei – engineering
- Tim Holbrook – special technical engineering
- Alan Moulder – mixing
- Howie Weinberg – mastering
- Len Peltier – sleeve art direction
- Steve J. Gerdes – sleeve design
- Melodie McDaniel – sleeve photography
- Bob Ludwig – mastering (2011 remaster)
- Evren Göknar – mastering (2011 remaster bonus CD)

== Charts ==
=== Weekly charts ===
Weekly chart performance for Siamese Dream
Chart (1993–2002)	Peak position
Australian Albums (ARIA)	7
Canadian Albums (RPM)	3
Dutch Albums (Album Top 100)	22
European Albums (European Top 100 Albums)	35
German Albums (Offizielle Top 100)	64
Greek Albums (Pop & Rock)	15
Greek Indie Albums (Pop & Rock)	5
Irish Albums (IRMA)	50
New Zealand Albums (RMNZ)	3
Norwegian Albums (VG-lista)	25
Scottish Albums (Official Charts)	44
Swedish Albums (Sverigetopplistan)	19
UK Albums (Official Charts)	4
US Billboard 200	10

2025 chart performance for Siamese Dream
Chart (2025)	Peak position
Croatian International Albums (HDU)	28
German Albums (Offizielle Top 100)	28
Irish Albums (Official Charts)	36
Swiss Albums (Schweizer Hitparade)	86

=== Year-end charts ===
1993 year-end chart performance for Siamese Dream
Chart (1993)	Position
New Zealand Albums (RMNZ)	40

1994 year-end chart performance for Siamese Dream
Chart (1994)	Position
Australian Albums (ARIA)	47
Canadian Albums (RPM)	7
New Zealand Albums (RMNZ)	5
US Billboard 200	15

== Certifications ==
Certifications and sales for Siamese Dream
Region	Certification	Certified units/sales
Australia (ARIA)	Platinum	70,000^{^}
Canada (Music Canada)	4× Platinum	400,000^{^}
Netherlands (NVPI)	Gold	50,000^{^}
New Zealand (RMNZ)	Platinum	15,000^{^}
Sweden (GLF)	Gold	50,000^{^}
United Kingdom (BPI)	Platinum	300,000^{‡}
United States (RIAA)	7× Platinum	7,000,000^{‡}
^{^} Shipments figures based on certification alone.^{‡} Sales+streaming figures based on certification alone.
