= Tristessa (song) =

Single by The Smashing Pumpkins

from the album Gish
- B-side: "La Dolly Vita"; "Honeyspider"
- Released: December 1990
- Recorded: Summer 1990 (single version); Winter 1990–1991 (Gish version)
- Genre: Alternative rock, hard rock, grunge, alternative metal
- Length: 3:40 (single version); 3:32 (Gish version)
- Label: Sub Pop
- Songwriter: Billy Corgan
- Producers: Butch Vig and Billy Corgan

The Smashing Pumpkins singles chronology
"I Am One" (1990)	"Tristessa" (1990)	"Siva" (1991)

"Tristessa" is a song by American alternative rock band The Smashing Pumpkins. The single was the Pumpkins' second ever release, and their first, and only, release on Sub Pop. Sub Pop released it as their "Single of the Month". It was written by Billy Corgan and later re-recorded for their debut album, Gish.

== Background ==
The title is a direct allusion to Jack Kerouac's 1960 novella of the same name. There were about 2,500 of the original 7" single pressed on pink marbled vinyl, while the rest (3,000) were pressed on black vinyl. It is estimated that an additional 100 to 200 were pressed on grey marbled wax. These are especially rare and have sold for several hundred dollars apiece.

Following the release of "Tristessa", the Smashing Pumpkins were targets of a bidding war by multiple record labels, and ended up signing to Caroline Records. Unlike "I Am One", which was also re-recorded for Gish, "Tristessa" did not receive a second single release, and neither version of the song appears on the 2001 greatest hits collection, Rotten Apples.

== Critical reception ==
CMJ called it "a grinding, drawled-out, lascivious rocker with a chisel-sharp pop aesthetic". The Chicago Sun-Times said it was an "epic rocker". In 2007, Spinner wrote, "a decade after the onset of diminishing returns, 'Tristessa' remains an absolute monster".

== Track listing ==
All songs written by Billy Corgan

1. "Tristessa" – 3:40
2. "La Dolly Vita" – 4:15
3. "Honeyspider" – 2:55 (present on UK 12" only)
