= Soma (song) =

Song by the Smashing Pumpkins

from the album Siamese Dream
- Released: July 27, 1993
- Recorded: 1992–1993
- Genre: Grunge; psychedelic rock
- Length: 6:39
- Label: Virgin
- Songwriter: Billy Corgan · James Iha
- Producer: Butch Vig · Billy Corgan

"Soma", originally called "Coma", is a song by the American alternative rock band the Smashing Pumpkins. An extended power ballad with facets of psychedelic rock, the track serves as the centerpiece of the band's second album, which the group released in July 1993 and titled Siamese Dream.

== Overview ==
The song-writing credits list James Iha and Billy Corgan as co-authors, but Corgan claims that Iha only wrote the chord structure for the beginning of the song, and that Corgan himself wrote the rest. The song is said to have included up to 40 overdubbed guitar tracks. Corgan says the song "is based on the idea that a love relationship is almost the same as opium: it slowly puts you to sleep, it soothes you, and gives you the illusion of sureness and security." It was also acknowledged that song was inspired by Corgan's break-up with his ex-wife, Chris Fabian. The song also contains references to a hallucinogenic drug which was featured in Aldous Huxley's novel Brave New World and features a prominent piano figure by Mike Mills of R.E.M.

== Reception ==
The song received rave reviews. Ned Raggett of AllMusic especially praised the song's guitar solo, while spotting elements from gothic rock and psychedelic rock. The song was also likened to Prince's "The Beautiful Ones". The critically acclaimed guitar solo was rated as the 24th in Rolling Stone's "The 25 Coolest Guitar Solos" list. The guitar solo was placed as 41st in NME's "50 Greatest Guitar Solos" list.

== Tribute album cover ==
American band Poison the Well covered the song for Reignition Records' 2005 tribute compilation The Killer in You: A Tribute to Smashing Pumpkins. In his review of the album, their rendition was said to be "probably the best of the bunch" by AllMusic's Greg Prato.
