= Rhinoceros (song) =

- 1991 UK promotional issue

Promotional single by The Smashing Pumpkins

from the album Gish
- B-side: "Siva"
- Released: April 1991
- Recorded: 1991
- Genre: Psychedelic rock; dream pop
- Length: 6:32 (album version); 5:57 (single version)
- Label: Caroline; Virgin
- Songwriter: Billy Corgan
- Producers: Butch Vig; Billy Corgan

The Smashing Pumpkins singles chronology
"Siva" (1991)	"Rhinoceros" (1991)	"Drown" (1992)

"Rhinoceros" is a song by American alternative rock band the Smashing Pumpkins from their debut album, Gish. It was written by Billy Corgan and is one of the few songs from Gish that has been performed consistently throughout the band's career.

Instead of being released as a CD single, "Rhinoceros" was instead featured as the first track on Lull. Corgan has mentioned that Lull is known within the band as "the Rhinoceros single".

== Music video ==
The music video for "Rhinoceros" was one of the Pumpkins' earliest, directed by Angela Conway, who also directed the group's "Siva." There are three main sources of footage used in the video.

The first batch of footage was filmed on a sound stage featuring the band members "looking bored" and playing guitars. In one part of these scenes, D'Arcy is playing with a white ping pong ball which appears to float, an effect that was achieved by filming the scene in slow motion and then running it backwards.

== Track listing ==
All songs written by Billy Corgan

7" vinyl promo single
No.	Title	Length
1.	"Rhinoceros"	5:57
2.	"Siva"	4:20

== Charts ==
Chart (1991)	Peak position
US Alternative Airplay (Billboard)	27
