= James Iha =

American rock musician

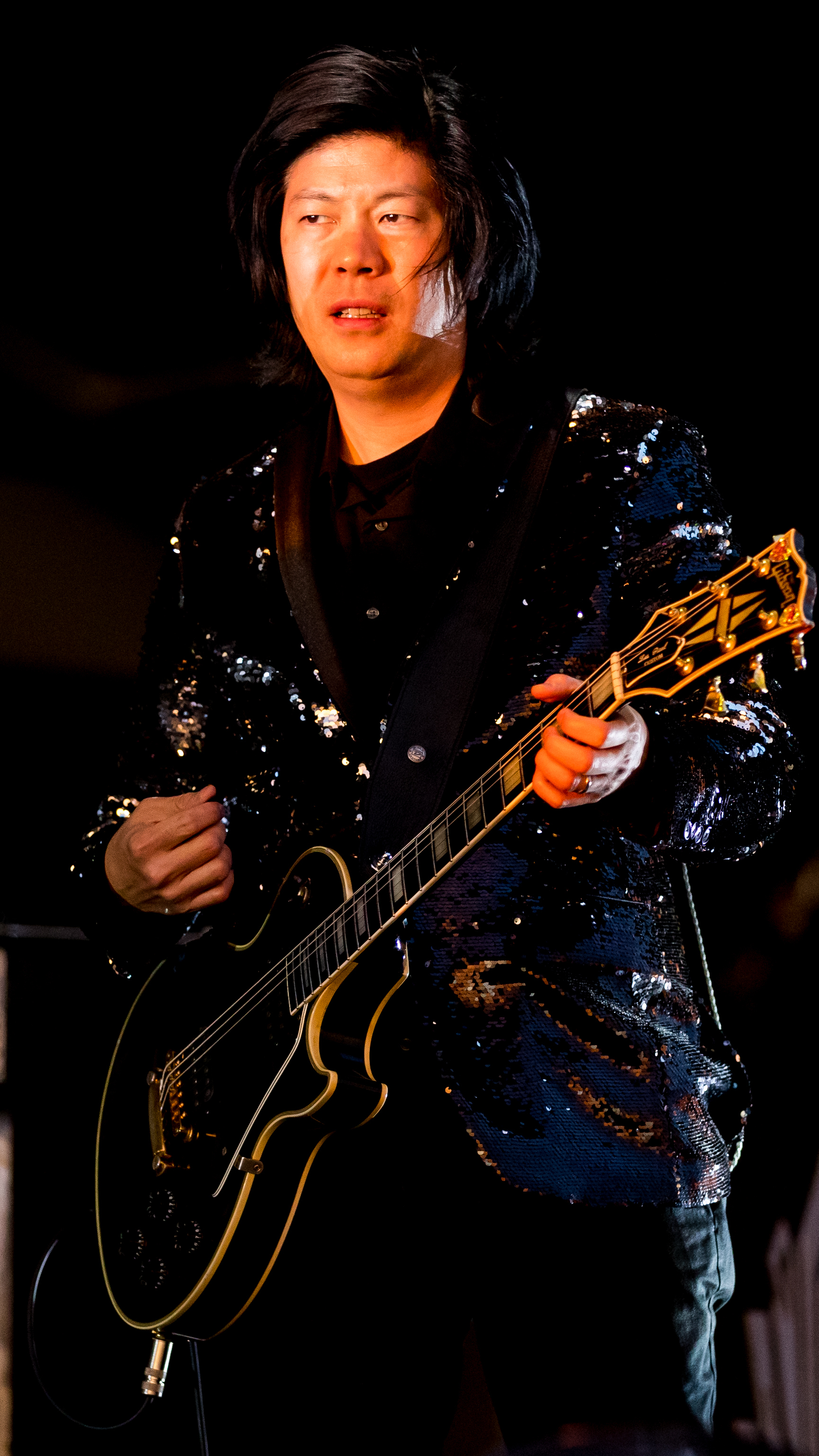
- Iha performing with the Smashing Pumpkins in 2019

Background information
- Born: James Yoshinobu Iha; March 26, 1968 (age 58); Chicago, Illinois, U.S.
- Genre: Alternative rock (Note: Iha's first solo album, Let It Come Down, notably shies away from Corgan's dark songwriting, instead opting for an acoustic country sound reminiscent of the songs he contributed to the Pumpkins.)
- Occupations: Musician; songwriter; record producer
- Instruments: Guitar, vocals
- Years active: 1988–present
- Member of: The Smashing Pumpkins; A Perfect Circle
- Formerly of: Tinted Windows; Whiskeytown
- Spouse: Ashley Usich-Iha
- Website: jamesiha.com

James Yoshinobu Iha (born March 26, 1968) is an American rock musician. He is best known as a guitarist and co-founder of the alternative rock band the Smashing Pumpkins. He was a member until the band's initial breakup in 2000 and rejoined in 2018.

Iha has also produced songs, contributed guitar, keyboards and vocals and produced remixes for a number of artists, including Midnight Movies, Isobel Campbell, Marilyn Manson, Whiskeytown, Scott Weiland and Michael Stipe. Among his other musical projects, Iha has been a permanent fixture of supergroup A Perfect Circle since 2003. He was also a member of Tinted Windows, a group with members of Cheap Trick, Fountains of Wayne, and Hanson. He previously co-owned independent record label Scratchie Records with Adam Schlesinger and, from 1999 to 2012, owned a recording studio with Schlesinger and Andy Chase of Ivy called Stratosphere Sound.

== Early life and background ==
Iha was born in Chicago, Illinois. He is a second-generation Japanese-American and is able to speak a little Japanese. He attended Elk Grove High School in Elk Grove Village, Illinois, which he described as "a boring, middle-class suburb of Chicago." Iha received average grades in high school, and, after a successful two-year stint at a local junior college, he majored in graphic design at Loyola University Chicago before dropping out to dedicate himself to the Smashing Pumpkins.

Like his bandmate Billy Corgan, Iha has a brother with a disability.

== The Smashing Pumpkins ==
In 1987 Iha, then playing guitar in the Chicago band Snake Train, met Billy Corgan via a friend. Corgan had already been telling people he was in a band called "Smashing Pumpkins", and decided to make it a real band with Iha.

Iha later became romantically involved with the band's bassist D'arcy Wretzky, but the couple broke up just prior to the band's performance at the Reading Festival in 1992. After a brief feud between the two, Iha sustained a friendly and close relationship with Wretzky, citing her as a best friend.

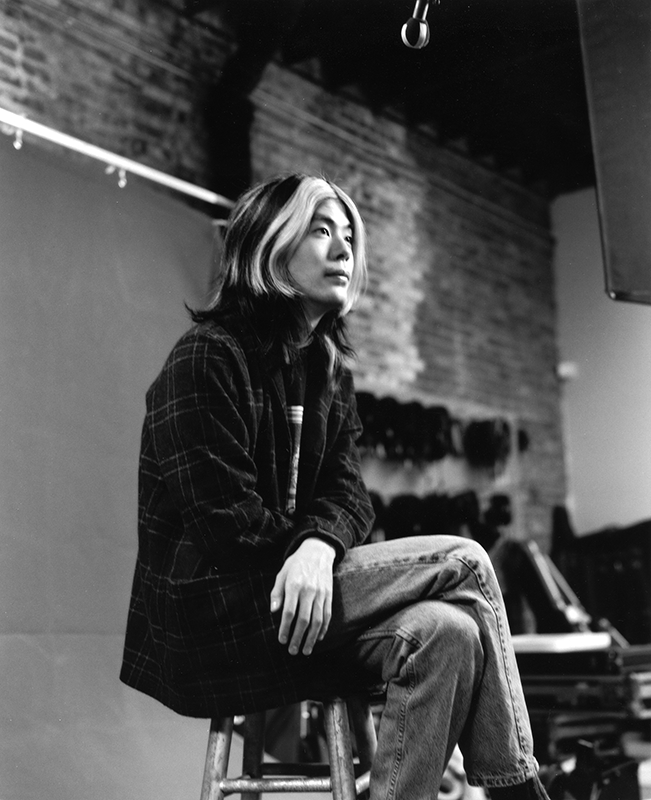
Iha in 1995

Iha wrote and sang a number of Smashing Pumpkins' songs, such as: "Blew Away" on Pisces Iscariot, "Bugg Superstar" on Vieuphoria, "Take Me Down" on Mellon Collie and the Infinite Sadness, "...Said Sadly", "Believe", "The Boy", and "The Bells" on The Aeroplane Flies High, "Summer" on the "Perfect" single and "Go" on Machina II/The Friends & Enemies of Modern Music. He co-wrote with Billy Corgan "I Am One" on Gish, "Soma" and "Mayonaise" on Siamese Dream, "Plume" on Pisces Iscariot and "Farewell and Goodnight" on Mellon Collie and the Infinite Sadness. He sang the band's covers of the Cure's "A Night Like This" and Syd Barrett's "Terrapin". During his time with the Pumpkins, Iha recorded with other bands, including Ivy, to which Adam Schlesinger contributed, and Swedish New Wave band the Sounds.

Billy Corgan has claimed that Iha played very little guitar on the first two Smashing Pumpkins albums, with Corgan himself playing most of the parts in the studio that Iha played live.

Iha was often considered the "quiet one" in Smashing Pumpkins, but he was known to engage in ad-libbed jokes and rap sessions at live performances. His humor was encapsulated in his use of the catchphrase, "I've seen a million faces, and I've rocked them all," originally from the Bon Jovi song "Wanted Dead or Alive".

In 1998, Iha released a moderately successful solo album, Let It Come Down. One music video was produced from this album, for the song "Be Strong Now", which was released as a four-track single.

When his former bandmates Billy Corgan and Jimmy Chamberlin revived the "Smashing Pumpkins" name, Iha did not participate, and in fact had not spoken to Corgan in years. Corgan stated in a 2008 blog entry that when he and Chamberlin reunited, the "door was open" for Iha to rejoin, but he declined, and Corgan said that he "can now say definitively that Iha isn't ever coming back." However, in a 2012 interview about the band re-formation, Iha stated that he was never even asked back into the band in the first place. Iha also admitted within the interview that he had not heard any of the band's new music since the re-formation.

In a March 2013 interview, he was asked to reflect on the band's history. He admitted that he rarely thought about his past success with the group, though he did look back on their six studio albums together with fondness. He revealed that he and Corgan had not spoken in around ten years, but that he did speak to Wretzky "once in a while".

On March 26 and 27, 2016, Iha joined Corgan and Chamberlin on stage unannounced at back-to-back Smashing Pumpkins shows at the Ace Hotel in downtown Los Angeles. Iha played a third show with the band in their hometown of Chicago at the Civic Opera house on April 14, 2016. In 2017, reunion rumors were leaked through various sources, and in 2018, Iha was spotted with Corgan, Chamberlin, and former Smashing Pumpkins guitarist Jeff Schroeder in the studio and at a photo shoot, confirming his return to the band. In summer 2018, the reunited band embarked on the Shiny and Oh So Bright Tour, which was followed at the end of the year by the release of their album Shiny and Oh So Bright, Vol. 1 / LP: No Past. No Future. No Sun. Iha has remained in the lineup ever since, appearing on the albums Cyr (2020), Atum: A Rock Opera in Three Acts (2022-2023), and Aghori Mhori Mei (2024), and touring extensively.

== Other work ==
=== 2001–2004: A Perfect Circle, producing, Japan ===
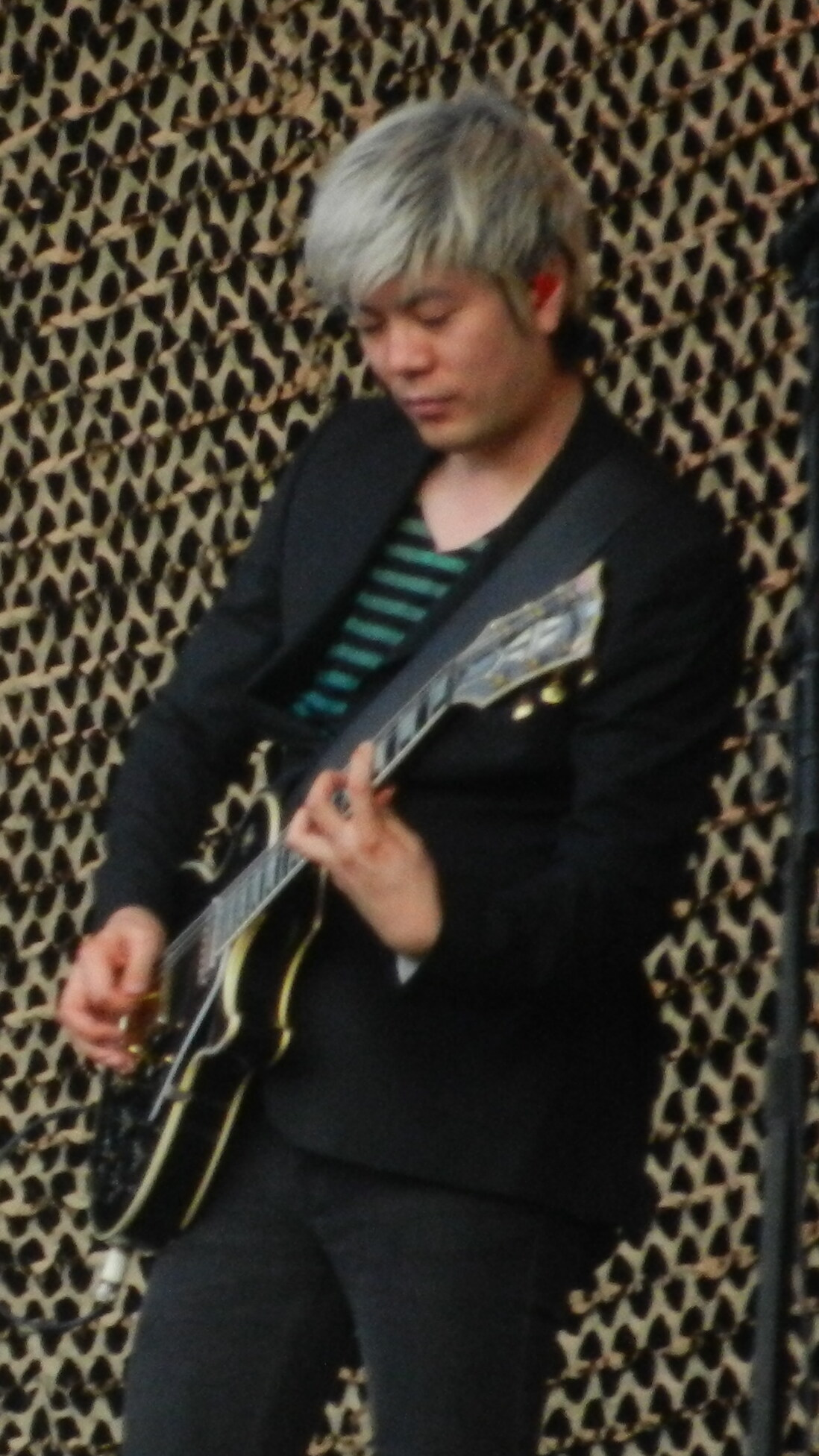
Iha with A Perfect Circle in 2011

After the Smashing Pumpkins' breakup in 2000, Iha pursued many projects. He continues to contribute to other artists' recordings, such as "Don't Be Sad" on Whiskeytown's Pneumonia released in 2001 and further guest appearances for bands Ivy and Fountains of Wayne, both of which he remained close to, appearing on virtually every release by both bands since 1997. Andy Chase of Ivy, and Adam Schlesinger of both Ivy and Fountains, recorded on most songs James produced or wrote for other artists. Schlesinger first recorded on Iha's song on "The Bells" by the Smashing Pumpkins.

Iha made bigger news when he joined the alternative rock supergroup A Perfect Circle in July 2003 in time for their Thirteenth Step club tour. He has since recorded on their 2004 album eMOTIVe as well as contributed remixes of Blue and Outsider, and is back with the band following its near 6-year long hiatus. In 2003, he joined Vanessa and the O's. The group released an EP Plus Rien in Sweden the same year and followed up with the album La Ballade d'O in 2005–06 on the band's independent record company Rushmore Recordings playing live shows in Sweden during the summer of 2005.

Iha has collaborated on musical and fashion design projects in Japan. He collaborated on and produced two tracks with Japanese musician Chara for her 2001 album Madrigal called "Boku ni Utsushite" and "Skirt". The latter was accompanied by a music video featuring Iha as a hunter in a forest. With the help of longtime friend and manager Isao Izutsu, Iha started the clothing label Vaporize (f.k.a. 'Vapor') in 2001, and recorded "Never Ever", his first solo song since the Smashing Pumpkins demise, for Vaporize's first runway show. The brand has been a collaboration with the Japanese label Beams since 2001.

In 2001, Iha played live with the Blank Theory and recorded on their album Beyond the Calm of the Corridor producing the song "Addicted" together with Schlesinger and contributing guitar playing.

=== 2005–2007: Soundtracks, collaborations, remixes ===
Iha scored the Japanese film Linda, Linda, Linda, released in late summer of 2005. The same year he teamed with Schlesinger again to produce a duet cover of Bobby Darin's "Splish Splash" for the soundtrack to the Wayne Wang film Because of Winn-Dixie. The same year Iha contributed guitar to some tracks of Chino Moreno's band Team Sleep second album, which has yet to be released.

Iha produced two tracks on the 2006 tribute album to Serge Gainsbourg, Monsieur Gainsbourg Revisited, "I Love You (Me Either)", that featured Cat Power and model Karen Elson singing and "L'Hotel" with Michael Stipe on vocals. Iha recorded on the track "The Ballad of Bonnie and Clyde" in a duet with singer Kazu Makino (of Blonde Redhead) on the US edition of the album.

In February 2006, a digital EP "In the Sun" produced by Iha featuring Michael Stipe and Chris Martin was released. The EP was for the benefit of Gulf Coast victims of Hurricane Katrina. The song was featured on an episode of Grey's Anatomy. In collaboration with Stipe, Iha played guitar at the "Bring 'Em Back Home Now" concert in March 2006 in New York City to benefit Iraq War veterans peace groups such as Veterans for Peace.

Iha remixed "Me Plus One", a track from Norwegian pop singer Annie's debut album Anniemal. Released in October 2006, Florida pop group the Postmarks's "Goodbye" EP features a remix by Iha. That same year, Iha teamed up with Schlesinger to co-produce folk band America's comeback album, Here & Now, and recorded on Scottish singer Isobel Campbell's album, collaborating on her renditions of traditional Irish and Scottish folk songs. In 2006 Iha recorded a cover of "Judy Is a Punk" by the Ramones for 30th anniversary of a Japanese clothing label Beams.

In February 2007, Side-Line announced that Iha delivered a remix for the Ladytron single "Weekend Mixes" out on March 9 via Smoke & Mirrors. In April 2007, he recorded a remix for the Midnight Movies track "Patient Eye".

Iha appeared on stage with Swedish band the Sounds, on the season finale of MTV's Bam's Unholy Union in April 2007 and contributed guitar to the song "Seatbacks and Traytables", on Fountains of Wayne's 2007 album Traffic and Weather. His former bandmate Melissa Auf der Maur contributed to that album.

=== 2007–Present: Second solo album and other collaborations ===
In the spring of 2007, Iha told Rolling Stone magazine that he was writing and recording songs for a second solo album. In the spring of 2007, Iha remixed Midnight Movies and the Postmarks as freebies on the Internet. A Chicago weekly reported in June 2007 that Iha had been living in New York City for some time, running a recording studio and independent label. Iha had lived in Manhattan since 2000 and has since moved to Brooklyn.

On December 22, 2008, the Swedish band A Camp (the solo project of the Cardigans vocalist Nina Persson) put out a press release announcing that their new album would come out on April 28, 2009, featuring guest appearances by Iha and other musicians.

On February 17, 2009, it was announced that Iha had, together with Taylor Hanson, Fountains of Wayne bassist Adam Schlesinger, and Cheap Trick drummer Bun E. Carlos formed a new band called Tinted Windows. The band played their first publicized gig at SXSW in Austin, Texas, on March 20. Their first album was released on April 21, 2009, to generally positive reviews.

In August 2010, members of A Perfect Circle posted messages to their Twitter accounts telling fans of their return after a 6-year long hiatus. The band later announced tour dates in which they would be playing the entirety of each of their three albums at each concert, with one album being played per night. It was announced that the lineup would consist of Maynard James Keenan, Billy Howerdel, Josh Freese, Matt McJunkins, and Iha.

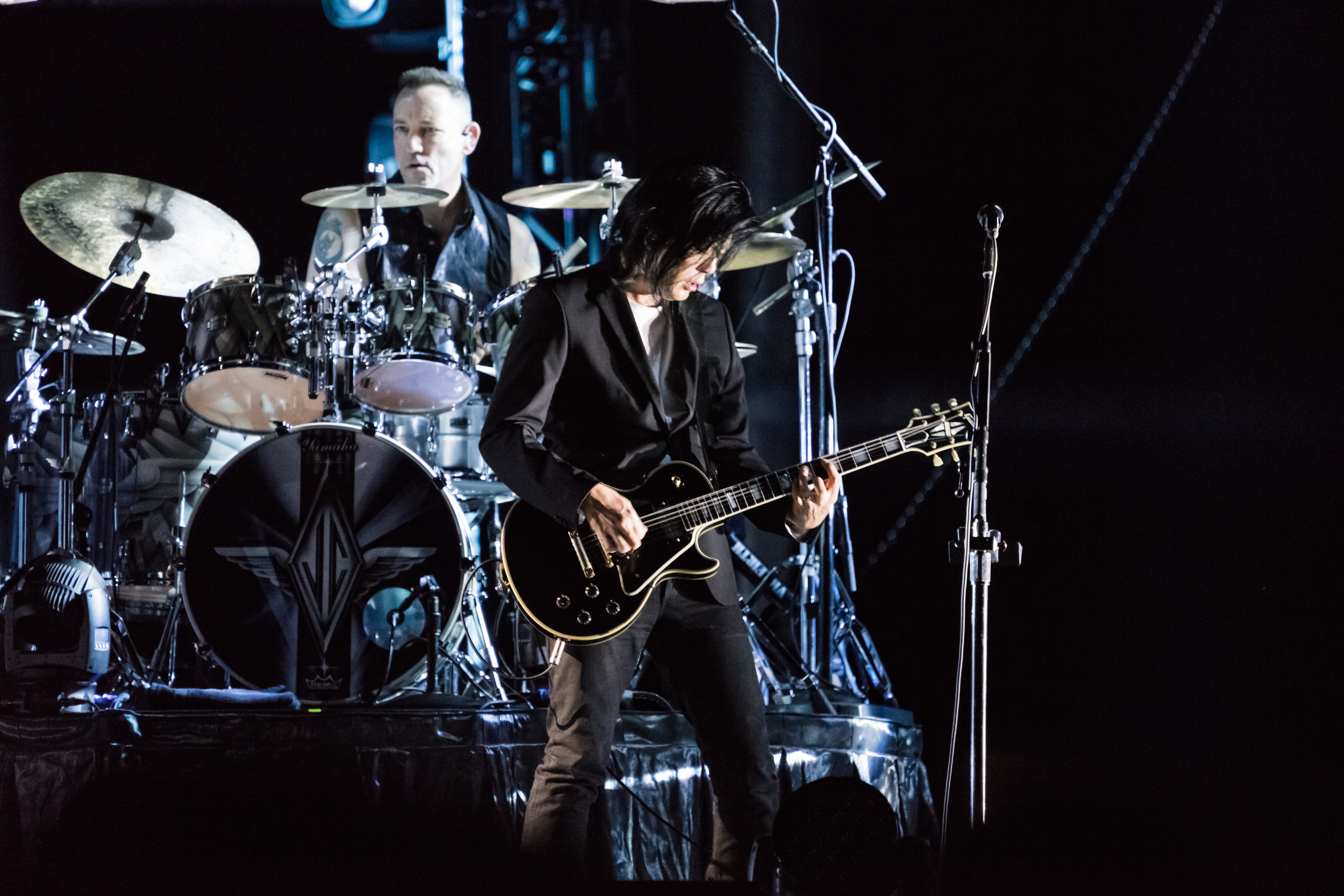
Iha and Jimmy Chamberlin (left) performing with the Smashing Pumpkins in 2018.

Iha's second solo album titled Look to the Sky was released in March 2012. To begin its promotion, Iha performed at the 2nd EMI ROCKS festival in Saitama, Japan in February 2012, and later in December that year performing a small European tour in London, Paris, Amsterdam and Lisbon.

In 2013, under management of David Bason, Iha collaborated with Japanese musician Yukihiro Takahashi, writing songs for and performing on Takahashi's album Life Anew, and performing as part of Takahashi's band "In Phase" on tours in Japan.

In 2014 Iha composed the soundtrack for the Lionsgate/Hulu series Deadbeat.

In 2016 Iha scored the soundtrack to James Franco's film Mother, May I Sleep with Danger?

In 2017 Iha composed the score for the drama series The Arrangement.

In 2023 Iha did the music for That 90s Show.

== Personal life ==
James is married to Ashley Usich; they have two children. Ashley's identical twin sister, Lindsay Usich, is married to Marilyn Manson.

== Discography ==
Solo albums

- 1998 – Let it Come Down
- 2012 – Look to the Sky

With Smashing Pumpkins

- 1991 – Gish
- 1991 – Lull
- 1993 – Siamese Dream
- 1994 – Pisces Iscariot
- 1994 – Earphoria
- 1995 – Mellon Collie and the Infinite Sadness
- 1996 – The Aeroplane Flies High
- 1998 – Adore
- 2000 – Machina/The Machines of God
- 2000 – Machina II/The Friends & Enemies of Modern Music
- 2001 – Rotten Apples
- 2018 – Shiny and Oh So Bright, Vol. 1 / LP: No Past. No Future. No Sun.
- 2020 – Cyr
- 2022–2023 – Atum: A Rock Opera in Three Acts
- 2024 – Aghori Mhori Mei

With A Perfect Circle

- 2004 – eMOTIVe (only feature on "People Are People")
- 2004 – aMotion
- 2013 – Three Sixty (compilation album)

With Whiskeytown

- 2001 – Pneumonia

With Vanessa and the O's

- 2003 – La Ballade d'O

With Tinted Windows

- 2009 – Tinted Windows

Soundtrack appearances

- 2005 – Because of Winn-Dixie soundtrack (with Adam Schlesinger on track 5)
- 2005 – Linda Linda Linda soundtrack (movie by Nobuhiro Yamashita)
- 2009 – Kakera: A Piece of Our Life (movie by Momoko Andô)
- 2023 – That '90s Show (American sitcom)

Guest appearances

- 1997 – Apartment Life (with Ivy)
- 2001 – Long Distance (with Ivy)
- 2001 – Madrigal (with Chara)
- 2003 – Welcome Interstate Managers (with Fountains of Wayne)
- 2003 – Wonderfully Nothing (with Brookville)
- 2004 – Auf der Maur (with Melissa Auf der Maur)
- 2005 – In the Clear (with Ivy)
- 2006 – Milkwhite Sheets (with Isobel Campbell)
- 2007 – Traffic and Weather (with Fountains of Wayne)
- 2009 – Colonia (with A Camp)
- 2010 – Hawk (with Isobel Campbell and Mark Lanegan)
- 2015 - "Blaster" (with Scott Weiland and the Wildabouts) on "Blue Eyes"
- 2017 – Ogilala (Billy Corgan) on "Processional"

== Videography ==
- 1994 – Vieuphoria (VHS)
- 2001 – Smashing Pumpkins – Greatest Hits Video Collection (DVD)
- 2005 – Charlie Charlie (Videoclip by Vanessa and the O's)

== Smashing Pumpkins songs written, co-written or covered by Iha ==
=== Written by James Iha ===
- "Wave Song" from Mashed Potatoes
- "Blew Away" from Pisces Iscariot
- "Why Am I So Tired?" from Vieuphoria and Earphoria
- "Bugg Superstar" from Vieuphoria and Earphoria
- "Take Me Down" from Mellon Collie and the Infinite Sadness
- "Farewell and Goodnight" from Mellon Collie and the Infinite Sadness
- "...Said Sadly" from The Aeroplane Flies High
- "Believe" from The Aeroplane Flies High
- "The Boy" from The Aeroplane Flies High
- "The Bells" from The Aeroplane Flies High
- "Summer" from the "Perfect" single
- "Go" on Machina II/The Friends & Enemies of Modern Music

=== Co-written with Billy Corgan ===
- "I Am One" from Gish
- "Soma" and "Mayonaise" from Siamese Dream
- "Plume" from Pisces Iscariot
- "Tribute to Johnny" from "The Aeroplane Flies High"
- "Innosense" on Machina II/The Friends & Enemies of Modern Music

== Notes ==
Preceded by original	The Smashing Pumpkins Guitarist; 1988–2000; 2018–present	Succeeded by Jeff Schroeder
