= Gish (album) =

Studio album by the Smashing Pumpkins
- Released: May 28, 1991
- Recorded: December 1990 – March 1991
- Studio: Smart (Madison, Wisconsin)
- Genres: Alternative rock; hard rock; grunge; art rock
- Length: 45:45
- Labels: Caroline; Hut
- Producers: Butch Vig; Billy Corgan

The Smashing Pumpkins chronology
Early 1989 Demos (1989)	Gish (1991)	Lull (1991)

Singles from Gish
- 1. "Tristessa" Released: December 1990; 2. "Siva" Released: August 19, 1991; 3. "I Am One" Released: August 24, 1992

Alternate cover
- 2011 reissue cover

Gish is the debut studio album by the American alternative rock band the Smashing Pumpkins, released on May 28, 1991, by Caroline Records. The album was produced by Butch Vig and frontman Billy Corgan, with the latter describing Gish as a "very spiritual album" and "an album about spiritual ascension".

Despite initially peaking at only number 195 on the Billboard 200 upon its release, Gish received critical acclaim, with particular praise directed at the band's distinctive psychedelic sound. The album was eventually certified platinum (at least one million copies shipped in the US) by the Recording Industry Association of America (RIAA), becoming one of the best-selling independent albums at the time. It has since been ranked by multiple publications as one of the best rock albums of the 1990s.

In 2022, Stuart Berman and Jeremy D. Larson of Pitchfork included the album in their list of "The 25 Best Grunge Albums of the '90s".

== Music and composition ==
Musically, Gish has been described as an alternative rock, hard rock, grunge, stoner rock and art rock album. As a writer, Billy Corgan wanted to find the balance between classic rock of bands playing heavy riffs like Black Sabbath and Led Zeppelin, and the sensuality and grace of alternative bands like the Cure, Siouxsie and the Banshees, and My Bloody Valentine. "For us, it was trying to become this balance point between what felt like dumb riff rock and then the stuff we were really attracted to coming out of the U.K. And then we put those pieces together with the Beatles somewhere in the middle". A song like "Rhinoceros" reflected that balance and what Corgan wanted to achieve: "we could be beautiful, pretty, psychedelic, and then flip the switch and be heavy and play a ripping lead." When composing the songs, Corgan was experimenting taking LSD to get a psychedelic feeling: "LSD gave me the confidence to attempt these things on kind of a weird tightrope wire act".

== Recording ==
Gish was recorded from December 1990 to March 1991 in Butch Vig's Smart Studios in Madison, Wisconsin, with a budget of $20,000. Vig and Corgan worked together as co-producers. At the time, Vig was still a relatively unknown producer. The longer recording period and larger budget were unprecedented for Vig, who later recalled:

(Corgan) wanted to make everything sound amazing and see how far he could take it; really spend time on the production and the performances. For me that was a godsend because I was used to doing records for all the indie labels and we only had budgets for three or four days. Having that luxury to spend hours on a guitar tone or tuning the drums or working on harmonies and textural things... I was over the moon to think I had found a comrade-in-arms who wanted to push me, and who really wanted me to push him.

The inclusion of a massive production style reminiscent of ELO and Queen was unusual for an independent band at the time. Whereas many albums at the time used drum sampling and processing, Gish used unprocessed drum recordings, and an exacting, unique guitar sound. Corgan also performed nearly all of the guitar and bass parts on the record, which was confirmed by Vig in a later interview.

The album's sessions, lasting 30 working days, were brisk by Pumpkins' standards, largely because of the group's inexperience. The majority of D'arcy Wretzky's bass lines and James Iha's guitar parts were re-recorded by Corgan using their instruments. The recording sessions put an intense strain on the band, with Wretzky later commenting that she did not know how the band survived it, and Corgan asserting he suffered a nervous breakdown.

Regarding the album's thematic content, Corgan would later say,

The album is about pain and spiritual ascension. People ask if it's a political album. It's not a political album, it's a personal album. In a weird kind of way, Gish is almost like an instrumental album—it just happens to have singing on it, but the music overpowers the band in a lot of places. I was trying to say a lot of things I couldn't really say in kind of intangible, unspeakable ways, so I was capable of doing that with the music, but I don't think I was capable of doing it with words.

== Title ==
The album was named after silent film icon Lillian Gish. In an interview, Corgan said, "My grandmother used to tell me that one of the biggest things that ever happened was when Lillian Gish rode through town on a train, my grandmother lived in the middle of nowhere, so that was a big deal ..." Later, Corgan joked that the album was originally going to be called "Fish", but was changed to "Gish" to avoid comparisons to jam band Phish.

== Critical reception ==
Professional ratings
Review scores
Source	Rating
AllMusic	4.5/5 stars
The A.V. Club	B+
Chicago Tribune	3.5/4 stars
Entertainment Weekly	B
Los Angeles Times	3.5/5 stars
NME	7/10
Pitchfork	8.3/10
Q	4/5 stars
The Rolling Stone Album Guide	4/5 stars
Spin Alternative Record Guide	9/10

Gish was met with largely enthusiastic reviews. On the month of its release, Chris Heim of the Chicago Tribune credited producer Butch Vig for helping the band achieve a "clearly defined" and "big, bold, punchy" sound for the album. Heim also indicated that the varied styles of the album would be a good addition to the alternative music culture of Chicago at the time—a culture that was sometimes perceived as inaccessible for new bands. Jon Pareles of The New York Times picked up on the eclectic mix of musical style on Gish as well, complementing its "pummeling hard rock", "gentle interludes", and "psychedelic crescendos". In an end-of-year recap of 1991 releases, Heim noted that the album constituted a "smashing local success story" for the Chicago area. Greg Kot, also of the Tribune, called Gish "perhaps the most audacious and accomplished" of all 1991 albums released by local bands; in an article later that year, Kot listed the album among the best of 1991. Chris Mundy of Rolling Stone called it "awe-inspiring" with "meticulously calculated chaos" and a "swirling energy".

Many substantive reviews of Gish emerged only with the 1993 release of Siamese Dream, when mainstream critics took their first look into the back-catalog of a band whose popularity was exploding. Derek Weiler of the Toronto Star noted that songs on Gish contained "either galloping riffs or trippy feedback hazes" and that the latter were especially effective and entertaining.

In 1992, Gish and the Smashing Pumpkins earned recognition at the Chicago Musician Awards, for which local music publication Illinois Entertainer polled readers and Chicago music industry figures such as critics, writers, and club owners. In separate polls, readers and industry figures chose Gish as the "best local album". Jimmy Chamberlin and James Iha won individual honors for their performances on the album, and the band as a whole earned the "best hometown national act" award.

== Commercial performance ==
Gish spent one week on the Billboard 200, peaking at number 195 (later re-peaking at number 146 upon its 2011 re-release); however, the album reached number one on the College Music Journal chart, which tracks airplay and popularity on college radio stations. It also had a six-week run on the New Zealand Albums Chart, peaking at number 40. Despite an inauspicious start, the album sold 100,000 copies in less than a year, far exceeding the expectations of indie label Caroline Records, a subsidiary of Virgin Records. In the US, the album was certified gold by RIAA on March 14, 1994. Until the release of the Offspring album Smash in 1994, Gish was the highest-selling independently released album of all time. Gish would later be reissued under the Virgin label, and was certified platinum in the US on February 5, 1999.

== Release history ==
The first mastering of Gish on CD was from Digital Audio Tape and appeared on Caroline Records, a subsidiary of Virgin Records. In 1994, after the success of follow-up Siamese Dream, the album was given a slight remaster and redesign and was reissued on the Virgin label. Both editions credit Howie Weinberg as mastering engineer. In 2008, the Smashing Pumpkins announced a 17th anniversary box set re-release of the album that would include older bonus material, but this set experienced delays. After finally negotiating the rights, Gish was re-issued in November 2011, being remastered on CD and Vinyl with extra tracks and revised packaging.

== Track listing ==
All tracks are written by Billy Corgan, except "I Am One", written by Corgan and James Iha.

No.	Title	Length
1.	"I Am One"	4:07
2.	"Siva"	4:20
3.	"Rhinoceros"	6:32
4.	"Bury Me"	4:48
5.	"Crush"	3:34
6.	"Suffer"	5:10
7.	"Snail"	5:10
8.	"Tristessa"	3:33
9.	"Window Paine"	5:51
10.	"Daydream"	3:08 (Note: "Daydream" ends at 1:57. A hidden track called "I’m Going Crazy" starts at 2:07)
Total length:		46:13

All tracks are written by Corgan, except where noted.

2011 Reissue bonus CD – Trippin' Through the Stars
No.	Title	Writer(s)	Length
1.	"Starla" (2011 mix)		11:01
2.	"Siva" (Peel Session)		4:49
3.	"Honeyspider" (Reel Time Demos/2011 mix)		2:54
4.	"Hippy Trippy" ("Crush" Music Box demo)		3:33
5.	"Snail" (live radio performance)		5:48
6.	"Plume" (2011 mix)	Corgan; Iha	3:34
7.	"Bury Me" (Reel Time Demos/2011 mix)		4:18
8.	"Daydream" (Old House demo)		2:05
9.	"Tristessa" (Sub Pop single/2011 mix)		3:48
10.	"Girl Named Sandoz" (Peel Session) (Eric Burdon & The Animals cover)	Eric Burdon; John Weider; Vic Briggs; Danny McCulloch; Barry Jenkins	3:35
11.	"Jesus is the Sun" (Apartment demo)		2:55
12.	"Blue" (Gish sessions demo)		4:07
13.	"Smiley" (Gish sessions demo)		3:36
14.	"I Am One" (Reel Time Demos/2011 mix)	Corgan; Iha	4:21
15.	"Seam" ("Suffer" Apartment demo)		4:09
16.	"La Dolly Vita" (2011 mix)		4:18
17.	"Pulseczar" (Gish sessions demo)		2:32
18.	"Drown" (alternate guitar solo)		8:17

2011 Reissue bonus DVD – Live at the Metro (August 25, 1990)
No.	Title	Writer(s)	Length
1.	"I Am One"	Corgan; Iha
2.	"Snail"
3.	"Rhinoceros"
4.	"Bury Me"
5.	"Tristessa"
6.	"Window Paine"
7.	"Razor"
8.	"Sookie Sookie" (Steppenwolf cover)	Don Covay; Steve Cropper
9.	"Godzilla" (Blue Öyster Cult cover)	Donald Roeser
10.	"Crush" (filmed in Billy's living room, July 27, 1993)

== Personnel ==
Those involved in the making of Gish are:

=== The Smashing Pumpkins ===
- Billy Corgan – vocals, guitar, bass, production
- James Iha – guitar
- D'arcy Wretzky – bass, vocals on "Daydream", layouts
- Jimmy Chamberlin – drums

=== Additional musicians ===
- Mary Gaines – cello on "Daydream"
- Chris Wagner – violin and viola on "Daydream"

=== Production ===
- Bob Knapp – photography
- Michael Lavine – photography
- Butch Vig – production, engineering
- Doug "Mr. Colson" Olson – engineering
- Howie Weinberg – mastering (1991 and 1994 releases)
- Evren Göknar – mastering (2011 remaster bonus CD)

== Charts ==
Chart performance for Gish
Chart (1991)	Peak position
US Billboard 200	195
US Billboard Heatseekers Albums	6
Chart (1994)	Peak position
Australian Albums Chart	51
New Zealand RIANZ Top 40	40
Chart (2011)	Peak position
US Billboard 200	146
US Billboard Top Pop Catalog Albums	20
Chart (2026)	Peak position
Dutch Vinyl Albums (Dutch Charts)	15
Croatian International Albums (HDU)	12

== Certifications ==
Certifications for Gish
Region	Certification	Certified units/sales
United Kingdom (BPI)	Silver	60,000^{^}
United States (RIAA)	Platinum	1,000,000^{^}
^{^} Shipments figures based on certification alone.
