= D'arcy Wretzky =

American bassist (born 1968)

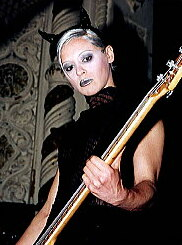
- Wretzky out on tour with The Smashing Pumpkins in 1998

Background information
- Born: May 1, 1968 (age 58); South Haven, Michigan, U.S.
- Genre: Alternative rock
- Occupation: Bassist
- Years active: 1988–1999
- Formerly of: The Smashing Pumpkins; Catherine

D'arcy Wretzky (/ˈdɑːrsiː ˈrɛtski/; born May 1, 1968) is an American musician. She was the original bassist of the alternative rock band the Smashing Pumpkins and is credited on their first six studio albums. She left the band in 1999. She has also been a member of Catherine and performed with Filter.

== Early life ==
Wretzky was born on May 1, 1968, and grew up in South Haven, Michigan, where her mother, Vikke Anderson, a working musician, encouraged D'arcy and her sisters to perform music. D'Arcy played violin for nine or ten years, played oboe, and performed in choirs while growing up. She also was in gymnastics. D'Arcy intended to have a musical career from the time she was ten years old.

She later referred to her father, Jerry Wretzky, a pipefitter with a love of horseback riding, as "a very strange man". D'Arcy was a self-described "tomboy" and had a contentious relationship with her sister. D'Arcy suffered from severe stage fright during her childhood. She attended South Haven's L.C. Mohr High School, where she grew interested in post-punk and played in cover bands. After high school, she moved to France to join a band, but the band had already disbanded upon her arrival, prompting her to return to the United States. She moved to Chicago and later joined the Smashing Pumpkins. Wretzky said that she is a self-taught bass player.

Wretzky was married to musician Kerry Brown from 1993 to 1999. Wretzky said that she had a miscarriage in 1999.

== 1988–1999: Smashing Pumpkins ==
After a concert at a local rock club, Wretzky overheard Billy Corgan criticizing the Dan Reed Network, which was performing. An argument and discussion followed and Corgan recruited her to be in his band, the nascent Smashing Pumpkins, which at the time, was merely Corgan and James Iha using a drum machine. Wretzky accepted, and Jimmy Chamberlin completed the lineup a few months later, after Joe Shanahan encouraged Corgan to add a live drummer.

Wretzky is the credited bassist on the Smashing Pumpkins' first five studio albums: Gish, Siamese Dream, Mellon Collie and the Infinite Sadness, Adore, and Machina/The Machines of God. It was confirmed by both her and Corgan, however, that Corgan played the bass tracks on Gish and Siamese Dream. Wretzky often contributed backing vocals on some songs on studio albums and in concert. She contributes vocally in Smashing Pumpkins songs such as "Daydream" on Gish; many songs on Siamese Dream; "1979", "Cupid De Locke", "Farewell and Goodnight", "Beautiful", and "Where Boys Fear to Tread" on Mellon Collie; and "Dreaming" and "The Bells" on The Aeroplane Flies High. Wretzky also co-wrote the Smashing Pumpkins song "Daughter".

In 1995, Wretzky and Iha started an independent record label called Scratchie Records, featuring artists such as the Frogs.

== 1999: Final tour, recording sessions and leaving the band ==
Wretzky's time in the band was marked with alternating periods of happiness and discomfort. Corgan considered her the "moral authority" and "moral conscience" of the band. In the aftermath of the success of 1995's Mellon Collie and the Infinite Sadness, Corgan said that she began an "apparent slow descent into insanity and/or drugs (take your pick)." After the short, nine-date "The Arising!" tour in April 1999 with all four original members performing together for the first time since 1996, Wretzky decided to leave the band and intended to pursue an acting career. The band was recording Machina/The Machines of God and Machina II/The Friends and Enemies of Modern Music at the time and as a result she performed very few bass parts on the album. Most of the bass parts were handled by Corgan himself. In early 2000, she was arrested for possession of crack cocaine. She was replaced on 2000's Machina tours by former Hole bassist Melissa Auf der Maur which began playing live in October 1999.

== 1999–present: Life after the Smashing Pumpkins ==
Wretzky did not participate in the Smashing Pumpkins' reunion. In 2008, she and her former boyfriend and bandmate James Iha filed a lawsuit against Virgin Records for selling ringtones of Smashing Pumpkins songs without their consent.

After many years out of the spotlight, Wretzky resurfaced in July 2009 by calling in unexpectedly on Chicago's Q101 FM with Ryan Manno. During the interview, she expressed that she was not healthy enough to be a musician, and repeatedly professed her admiration for Monkees frontman Davy Jones, who was known to be an early romantic crush of hers. She also discussed her appreciation for the band Silversun Pickups, who have a sound influenced by the early Gish era of the Smashing Pumpkins. She mentioned that she lived on a farm in Michigan, that she had briefly lived in Austin, Texas, sometime during the previous decade, and that her former fiancé Wendell Green had died.

Wretzky was jailed on February 1, 2011, for missing four court dates related to a ticket she received for failing to control her wild horses, allowing them to freely roam the streets at night causing interference to local traffic. She spent six days in jail. On February 7, 2011, the day after she was released from jail, she was arrested again, this time on a misdemeanor drunken-driving road rage charge in South Haven, Michigan. She was sent back to jail.

In 2013, Wretzky's relationship with Corgan remained tense, with both parties saying that they were not speaking. In September 2014, she tried to re-establish contact with him, but Corgan had changed his phone number. In August 2016, Corgan posted a video to Facebook which said that he and Wretzky had recently reestablished communication, saying, "I've been in communication with D'arcy for the first time in 16 or 17 years, it's awesome to have my friend back." Corgan emphasized that this did not necessarily mean the band was getting back together, instead insisting "my primary interest in the old band was us having good relationships again."

On February 14, 2018, Wretzky gave her first interview in nearly 20 years. In it, she was highly critical of Corgan and their past.

Wretzky said that she had been offered a contract to rejoin the band on the Shiny and Oh So Bright Tour, but that Corgan rescinded the offer soon after. Corgan released a statement denying the claims, writing that "Ms. Wretzky has repeatedly been invited out to play with the group, participate in demo sessions, or at the very least, meet face-to-face, and in each and every instance she always deferred." Wretzky later provided screenshots of a text message conversation with Corgan, which appeared to corroborate her account of the exchange.

== Other musical work ==
In 1996, Wretzky joined the band Catherine as a second vocalist for their final album, Hot Saki & Bedtime Stories. She also appeared in the video for Four Leaf Clover. At the time, Wretzky was married to Catherine drummer Kerry Brown. She contributed vocals to the track "One and Two" on James Iha's 1998 solo album, Let It Come Down.

In 1999, she worked with cellist Eric Remschneider, whom she had worked with when he had recorded with The Smashing Pumpkins. That year, she also contributed additional vocals on the Filter song "Cancer" from Title of Record. In a 2016 interview with Loudwire, Filter lead singer Richard Patrick spoke of a romantic relationship which he had with Wretzky, saying that she was the subject of a song he wrote called "Miss Blue", also on Title of Record.
