= The Smashing Pumpkins discography =

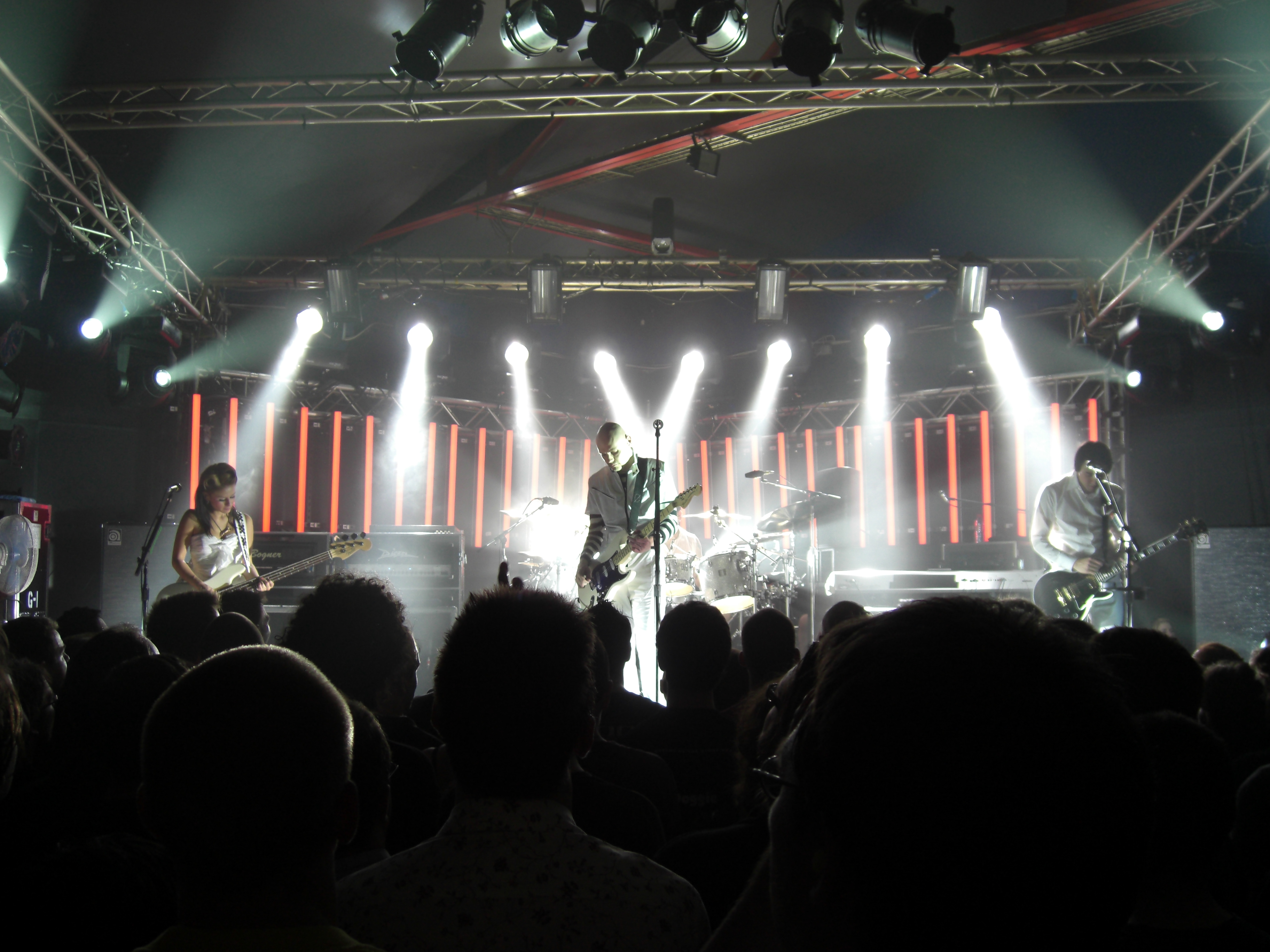
- The Smashing Pumpkins on May 24, 2007, at den Atelier, Luxembourg
- Studio albums: 13
- Extended plays: 7
- Soundtrack albums: 5
- Live albums: 10
- Compilation albums: 7
- Singles: 47
- Video albums: 5
- Music videos: 37
- Demo albums: 4
- Promotional singles: 21
- Box sets: 4

The discography of the Smashing Pumpkins, an American alternative rock band formed in Chicago, Illinois, consists of thirteen studio albums, four live albums, one digital live album series, eleven compilation albums (including box sets and promotional releases), seven extended plays (including promotional releases), 68 singles (including promotional releases), five video albums, 37 music videos, and contributions to five soundtrack albums. This list does not include material recorded by the Smashing Pumpkins members with other side projects.

As of 2012, the Smashing Pumpkins have sold 30 million albums according to EMI.

== Albums ==
=== Studio albums ===
Title	Album details	Peak chart positions										Sales	Certifications (sales thresholds)
Title	Album details	US	AUS	BEL	CAN	FRA	GER	IRL	NLD	NZ	UK	Sales	Certifications (sales thresholds)
Gish	Released: May 28, 1991; Label: Caroline, Hut; Format: CD, Cassette (CS), LP	146	51	—	125	—	—	—	—	40	—	US: 711,000 (Note: Sales as of October 1995)	RIAA: Platinum; BPI: Silver
Siamese Dream	Released: July 19, 1993; Label: Virgin; Format: CD, CS, 2×LP	10	7	—	3	—	28	36	22	3	4		RIAA: 7× Platinum; ARIA: Platinum; BPI: Platinum; MC: 4× Platinum; NVPI: Gold; RMNZ: Platinum
Mellon Collie and the Infinite Sadness	Released: October 23, 1995; Label: Virgin; Format: 2×CD, 2×CS, 3×LP, 2×MiniDisc	1	1	2	1	6	21	3	6	1	4	US: 10,000,000 (Note: Sales as of October 2012)	RIAA: 11× Platinum; ARIA: 4× Platinum; BPI: Platinum; BRMA: Platinum; BVMI: Gold; IRMA: 2× Platinum; MC: Diamond; NVPI: Gold; RMNZ: 6× Platinum; SNEP: Platinum
Adore	Released: June 2, 1998; Label: Virgin; Format: CD, CS, 1.5×LP	2	1	1	2	1	3	—	5	1	5		RIAA: Platinum; ARIA: Platinum; BPI: Gold; MC: 2× Platinum; RMNZ: Platinum; SNEP: Gold
Machina/The Machines of God	Released: February 29, 2000; Label: Virgin; Format: CD, CS, 2×LP, MiniDisc	3	2	4	2	4	4	3	15	4	7		RIAA: Gold; ARIA: Gold; BPI: Silver; MC: Platinum; RMNZ: Gold; SNEP: Gold
Machina II/The Friends & Enemies of Modern Music	Released: September 5, 2000; Label: Constantinople; Format: 3×10-inch+2×LP, digital download	Free download										^{[II]}	
Zeitgeist	Released: July 10, 2007; Label: Reprise, Martha's Music; Format: CD, CD+DVD, digital download	2	7	6	1	24	7	5	7	1	4		RIAA: Gold; RMNZ: Gold
Oceania	Released: June 19, 2012; Label: EMI, Martha's Music; Format: CD, digital download, 2×LP	4	8	25	4	33	36	24	34	9	19	US: 102,000 (Note: Sales as of September 2012)	
Monuments to an Elegy	Released: December 9, 2014; Label: BMG, Martha's Music; Format: CD, digital download, LP	33	55	136	—	154	62	83	94	—	59		
Shiny and Oh So Bright, Vol. 1 / LP: No Past. No Future. No Sun.	Released: November 16, 2018; Label: Napalm; Format: CD, digital download, LP	54	63	71	66	123	20	84	79	—	43		
Cyr	Released: November 27, 2020; Label: Sumerian; Format: CD, digital download, 2×LP	86	36	154	66	104	31	95	—	—	71		
Atum: A Rock Opera in Three Acts	Released: May 5, 2023; Label: Martha's Music; Format: streaming, digital download, 4×LP, 3×CD	111	5	64	—	131	18	—	—	—	85		
Aghori Mhori Mei	Released: August 2, 2024; Label: Martha's Music; Format: streaming, digital download, LP, CD	130	— (Note: Aghori Mhori Mei did not enter the Australian Albums Chart but peaked at number eight on the Australian Digital Albums.)	101	—	—	51	—	—	—	— (Note: Aghori Mhori Mei did not enter the UK Albums Chart but peaked at number 6 on the UK Albums Downloads Chart and 21 on the UK Albums Sales Chart.)		
"—" denotes a release that did not chart or was not released in that territory.

II Machina II had a free internet release and thus did not chart and was not eligible for certification.

=== Live albums ===
Title	Album details	Comments
Earphoria	Promotional release: October 4, 1994; Commercial release: November 19, 2002; Label: Virgin; Format: CD	Soundtrack companion piece to Vieuphoria.
Live in Chicago October 23, 1995	Released: November 1995; Label: Virgin/Delabel; Format: CD	Limited promotional 5-track CD issued with French printings of Mellon Collie and the Infinite Sadness.
Live at Cabaret Metro 10-5-88	Released: December 2, 2000; Label: Constantinople; Format: CD	Limited CD given away to attendants exiting the then-final show at the Metro concert hall. A recording of the band's fourth show—their first with Jimmy Chamberlin and first at the Metro. Cover art is by James Iha.
Bonus EP	Released: February 25, 2009; Label: LiveSmashingPumpkins.com; Format: Digital download	4-track digital release available to those who purchased a two-night ticket package for the 20th Anniversary Tour from Ticketmaster.
Live at Kawasaki 2.24.92	Released: March 2022; Label: Martha's Music; Format: 2xLP	Released in celebration of the 30th anniversary of Gish.
Live at The Viper Room 1.15.98	Released: 2022; Label: Martha's Music; Format: 2xLP	The Smashing Pumpkins' historic acoustic 1998 performance at the Viper Room in LA.
The Rubano Tapes Vol. 1	Released: 2022; Label: Martha's Music; Format: 2xLP	Live recordings 1988 - 1991
The Rubano Tapes Vol. 2	Released: 2022; Label: Martha's Music; Format: 2xLP	Mastered by Howie Weinberg.
London By Day - Live at the BBC	Released: 2023; Label: Martha's Music; Format: 2xLP	Recorded live on 2014-12-05 at The BBC Maida Vale Studios, London
Siamese Dream Cassette	Released: 2023; Label: Martha's Music; Format: Cassette	A never-before-released live show from The Smashing Pumpkins' Siamese Dream tour in Nashville on April 12, 1994. Comes as box set with 2 candles

=== Compilation albums ===
Title	Album details	Peak chart positions										Certifications
Title	Album details	US	AUS	BEL	CAN	GER	IRL	ITA	NZ	SCO	UK	Certifications
Pisces Iscariot	Released: October 4, 1994; Label: Virgin; Format: CD, CS, LP, LP+7-inch	4	17	—	14	—	—	—	2	—	96	RIAA: Platinum; MC: Platinum
The Smashing Pumpkins 1991–1998	Released: December 1999; Label: Virgin; Format: CD	—	—	—	—	—	—	—	—	—	—	
Rotten Apples	Released: November 20, 2001; Label: Virgin; Format: CD, CS; Greatest hits	31	4	15	5	12	6	15	5	19	28	RIAA: Gold; ARIA: Gold; BPI: Platinum; MC: Platinum
Judas O	Released: November 20, 2001; Label: Virgin; Format: CD (Bonus disc issued with limited-edition printings of Rotten Apples)	—	—	—	—	—	—	—	—	—	—	
True Power. True Faith.	Released: March 21, 2005; Label: EMI; Format: CD	—	—	—	—	—	—	—	—	—	—	
Rarities and B-Sides	Released: April 5, 2005; Label: EMI; Format: Digital download	—	—	—	—	—	—	—	—	—	—	
Zodeon at Crystal Hall	Released: November 24, 2025; Label: Martha's Music; Format: LP	—	—	—	—	—	—	—	—	—	—	
"—" denotes albums that did not chart.

== EPs ==
For the live extended plays Live in Chicago October 23, 1995 and Bonus EP, see the live albums section of this article.

Title	EP details	Peak chart positions								Certifications
Title	EP details	US	US Ind.	AUS	GER	SCO	SWE	UK	UK Rock	Certifications
Lull^{[I]}	Released: November 5, 1991; Label: Hut; Format: 12-inch, CD, CS	—	—	74	—	—	—	90	5	
Peel Sessions	Released: June 15, 1992; Label: Hut; Format: 12-inch, CD	—	—	—	—	—	—	94	—	
Zero^{[II]}	Released: April 23, 1996; Label: Virgin; Format: 12-inch, CD, CS	46	—	—	—	19	22	—	1	RIAA: Gold
Still Becoming Apart^{[III]}	Released: February 29, 2000; Label: Virgin; Format: CD	—	—	—	—	—	—	—	—	
American Gothic	Released: January 1, 2008; Label: Reprise; Format: CD, digital download	—	—	82	77	— (Note: American Gothic did not enter the Scottish Albums Chart but peaked at number 28 on the Scottish Singles Chart.)	—	155	—	
Teargarden by Kaleidyscope Vol. 1: Songs for a Sailor	Released: March 25, 2010^{[IV]}; Label: Self-released; Format: Digital download, CD+7-inch	—	43	—	—	—	—	—	—	
Teargarden by Kaleidyscope Vol. 2: The Solstice Bare	Released: November 23, 2010^{[IV]}; Label: Self-released; Format: Digital download, CD+12-inch	—	—	—	—	—	—	—	—	
"—" denotes albums that did not chart.

I The song "Rhinoceros" charted from this release.
II The song "Zero" charted from this release.
III Promotional bonus disc issued with limited-edition printings of Machina/The Machines of God.
IV Songs from Songs for a Sailor were sporadically released one at a time to be downloaded starting from December 8, 2009.

== Box sets ==
Title	Album details	Peak chart positions			Certifications
Title	Album details	US	UK	UK Rock	Certifications
Siamese Singles	Released: December 27, 1994; Label: Virgin; Format: 4×7-inch box set	—	—	27	
The Aeroplane Flies High	Released: November 26, 1996; Label: Virgin; Format: 5×CD box set	42	160	—	RIAA: Platinum
Cyr 7" Singles Box Set	Released: June 9, 2021; Label: Sumerian Records; Format: 5×7-inch box set	—	—	—	
Machina: Aranea Alba Editio	Released: September 5, 2025; Label: Martha's Music; Format: 8×LP box set	—	—	—	
"—" denotes albums that did not chart.

== Singles ==
=== 1990s ===
List of singles released in the 1990s decade, showing selected chart positions and certifications
Song	Year	Peak chart positions										Certifications	Album
Song	Year	US	US Alt.	AUS	BEL (FL)	CAN	FRA	IRL	NLD	NZ	UK	Certifications	Album
"I Am One"	1990	—	—	—	—	—	—	—	—	—	—		non-album singles
"Tristessa"	1990	—	—	—	—	—	—	—	—	—	—		non-album singles
"Siva"	1991	—	—	—	—	—	—	—	—	45	—		Gish
"I Am One"	1992	—	—	—	—	—	—	—	—	—	73		Gish
"Cherub Rock"	1993	—	7	87	—	91	—	—	—	16	31	RMNZ: Gold	Siamese Dream
"Today"	1993	— (Note: "Today" did not enter the Billboard Hot 100, but peaked at number 3 on the Bubbling Under Hot 100 Singles chart, which acts as a 25-song extension to the Hot 100.)	4	57	—	82	—	—	—	27	44	BPI: Silver; RMNZ: Platinum	Siamese Dream
"Disarm"	1994	— (Note: "Disarm" did not enter the Billboard Hot 100, but peaked at number 48 on the Hot 100 Airplay (Radio Songs) chart,)	8	16	—	13	—	—	—	29	11	BPI: Silver; RMNZ: Platinum	Siamese Dream
"Rocket"	1994	—	—	—	—	31	—	—	—	26	89		Siamese Dream
"Bullet with Butterfly Wings"	1995	22	2	33	—	18	17	18	—	41	20	RIAA: Gold; BPI: Gold; RMNZ: 2× Platinum	Mellon Collie and the Infinite Sadness
"1979"	1996	12	1	16	21	2	38	6	29	9	16	RIAA: Gold; BPI: Platinum; RMNZ: 4× Platinum	Mellon Collie and the Infinite Sadness
"Zero"	1996	— (Note: "Zero" did not enter the Billboard Hot 100, but peaked at number 49 on the Hot 100 Airplay (Radio Songs) chart,)	9	—	—	—	—	—	—	3	—	RIAA: Gold; RMNZ: Platinum	Mellon Collie and the Infinite Sadness
"Tonight, Tonight"	1996	36	5	21	39	32	—	13	46	2	7	BPI: Gold; RMNZ: Platinum	Mellon Collie and the Infinite Sadness
"Thirty-Three"	1996	39	2	51	—	24	—	—	—	7	21		Mellon Collie and the Infinite Sadness
"The End Is the Beginning Is the End"	1997	— (Note: "The End Is the Beginning Is the End" did not enter the Billboard Hot 100, but peaked at number 50 on the Hot 100 Airplay (Radio Songs) chart,)	4	10	37	29	41	7	74	6	10	ARIA: Gold	Batman & Robin soundtrack
"Ava Adore"	1998	42	3	19	—	16	—	15	77	5	11		Adore
"Perfect"	1998	54	3	56	—	11	—	—	—	18	24		Adore
"The Everlasting Gaze"	1999	— (Note: "The Everlasting Gaze" did not enter the Billboard Hot 100, but peaked at number 13 on the Bubbling Under Hot 100 Singles chart, which acts as a 25-song extension to the Hot 100.)	4	—	—	—	—	—	—	—	—		Machina/The Machines of God
"—" denotes releases that did not chart.

=== 2000s ===
List of singles released in the 2000s decade, showing selected chart positions and certifications
Song	Year	Peak chart positions										Album
Song	Year	US	US Alt.	AUS	BEL (FL)	CAN	IRL	ITA	NZ	SPA	UK	Album
"Stand Inside Your Love"	2000	— (Note: "Stand Inside Your Love" did not enter the Billboard Hot 100, but peaked at number 6 on the Bubbling Under Hot 100 Singles chart, which acts as a 25-song extension to the Hot 100.)	2	31	—	—	30	4	17	4	23	Machina/The Machines of God
"Try, Try, Try"	2000	—	—	—	—	—	—	36	—	—	73	Machina/The Machines of God
"Untitled"	2001	—	—	—	—	—	46	—	—	—	—	Rotten Apples
"Tarantula"	2007	54	2	— (Note: "Tarantula" did not enter the Australian ARIA Singles Chart but peaked at number 46 on the ARIA Digital Track Chart.)	50	30	44	—	—	—	59	Zeitgeist
"That's the Way (My Love Is)"	2007	—	32	—	—	—	—	—	—	—	94	Zeitgeist
"G.L.O.W."	2008	— (Note: "G.L.O.W." did not enter the Billboard Hot 100, but peaked at number 8 on the Bubbling Under Hot 100 Singles chart, which acts as a 25-song extension to the Hot 100.)	11	—	—	80	—	—	—	—	—	non-album single
"—" denotes releases that did not chart.

=== 2010s ===
List of singles released in the 2010s decade, showing selected chart positions and certifications
Song	Year	Peak chart positions						Album
Song	Year	US Alt.	US Main.	US Rock	BEL (FL) Tip	CAN Rock	MEX Ing.	Album
"Widow Wake My Mind/A Song for a Son"	2010	—	—	—	—	—	—	Teargarden by Kaleidyscope - Vol. 1: Songs for a Sailor
"Astral Planes/A Stitch in Time"	2010	—	—	—	—	—	—	Teargarden by Kaleidyscope - Vol. 1: Songs for a Sailor
"The Celestials"	2012	29	—	45	62	40	—	Oceania
"Being Beige"	2014	—	—	—	—	—	—	Monuments to an Elegy
"One and All (We Are)"	2014	—	34	— (Note: "One and All" did not enter the Rock Songs chart, but peaked at number 47 on the Rock Airplay chart.)	—	—	—	Monuments to an Elegy
"Drum + Fife"	2014	—	—	—	—	—	—	Monuments to an Elegy
"Run2me"	2015	—	—	—	—	—	—	Monuments to an Elegy
"Solara"	2018	— (Note: "Solara" did not enter the Billboard Alternative Songs Chart, but peaked at number 16 on the Alternative Digital Song Sales chart.)	26	47	—	30	41	Shiny and Oh So Bright, Vol. 1 / LP: No Past. No Future. No Sun
"Silvery Sometimes (Ghosts)"	2018	38	—	— (Note: "Silvery Sometimes (Ghosts)" did not enter the Rock Songs chart, but peaked at number 41 on the Rock Airplay chart.)	— (Note: "Silvery Sometimes (Ghosts)" did not enter the Wallonia Ultratop 50, but entered the Ultratop Bubbling Under Chart.)	46	—	Shiny and Oh So Bright, Vol. 1 / LP: No Past. No Future. No Sun
"Knights of Malta"	2018	—	—	—	—	—	—	Shiny and Oh So Bright, Vol. 1 / LP: No Past. No Future. No Sun
"—" denotes releases that did not chart.

=== 2020s ===
List of singles released in the 2020s decade, showing selected chart positions and certifications
Song	Year	Peak chart positions										Certifications	Album
Song	Year	US Alt.	US Hard Rock	US Main.	US Rock Air.	AUS Digi.	CAN Rock	ITA Air.	NZ Hot	PRY	ROU	Certifications	Album
"Cyr/The Colour of Love"	2020	19	—	—	35	—	—	—	—	—	—		Cyr
"Confessions of a Dopamine Addict/Wrath"	2020	—	—	—	—	—	—	—	—	—	—		Cyr
"Anno Satana/Birch Grove"	2020	—	—	—	—	—	—	—	—	—	—		Cyr
"Ramona/Wyttch"	2020	—	—	—	—	—	—	—	—	—	—		Cyr
"Purple Blood/Dulcet in E"	2020	—	—	—	—	—	—	—	—	—	—		Cyr
"Beguiled"	2022	12	15	7	7	—	25	—	—	—	—		Atum: A Rock Opera in Three Acts
"Spellbinding"	2023	16	—	—	26	—	—	—	—	—	—		Atum: A Rock Opera in Three Acts
"Empires"	2023	—	—	24	—	—	—	—	—	—	—		Atum: A Rock Opera in Three Acts
"Mayonaise"	2023	—	—	—	—	—	—	—	—	—	—	RMNZ: Gold	Siamese Dream
"Sighommi"	2024	14	5	17	12	—	25	—	—	—	—		Aghori Mhori Mei
"Who Goes There"	2024	21	—	—	41	—	—	—	—	—	—		Aghori Mhori Mei
"Chrome Jets"	2025	—	—	—	—	—	—	—	—	—	—		non-album single
"Zombie" (with Yungblud)	2026	1	—	24	6	12	8	75	13	5	200	BPI: Silver	Idols
"Black Stars"	2026	20	—	18	12	—	—	—	—	—	—		The Hunger Games: Sunrise on the Reaping - The Album
"—" denotes releases that did not chart.

=== Promotional singles ===
Song	Year	Peak chart positions							Album
Song	Year	US Air.	US Active Rock	US Alt.	US Main.	CAN	CAN Alt.	ICE	Album
"Rhinoceros"	1991	—	—	27	—	—	—	—	Lull EP
"Daughter"^{[V]}	1992	—	—	—	—	—	—	—	Non-album single
"Drown"	1992	—	—	24	—	—	—	—	Singles: Original Motion Picture Soundtrack
"Landslide"	1994	30	—	3	—	47	—	—	Pisces Iscariot
"Muzzle"	1996	57	—	8	10	33	1	—	Mellon Collie and the Infinite Sadness
"Eye"	1997	49	—	8	—	—	—	6	Lost Highway soundtrack
"Crestfallen"	1998	—	—	—	—	—	—	—	Adore
"Daphne Descends"^{[VII]}	1998	—	—	—	—	—	—	—	Adore
"Summer"^{[VIII]}	1998	—	—	—	—	—	—	—	"Perfect"
"To Sheila"	1999	— (Note: "To Sheila" did not enter the Billboard Hot 100, but peaked at number 4 on the LyricFind U.S. Songs Chart.)	—	—	—	—	—	—	Adore
"Heavy Metal Machine"^{[X]}	2000	—	—	—	—	—	—	—	Machina/The Machines of God
"I of the Mourning"	2000	—	—	—	—	—	—	—	Machina/The Machines of God
"The Rose March"	2008	—	—	—	—	—	—	—	American Gothic
"FOL"	2009	—	—	—	—	—	—	—	Non-album single
"A Song for a Son"	2009	—	—	—	—	—	—	—	Teargarden by Kaleidyscope
"Widow Wake My Mind"	2010	—	—	—	—	—	—	—	Teargarden by Kaleidyscope
"Astral Planes/A Stitch in Time"	2010	—	—	—	—	—	—	—	Teargarden by Kaleidyscope
"The Fellowship"	2010	—	—	—	—	—	—	—	Teargarden by Kaleidyscope
"Freak"	2010	—	38	27	—	—	—	—	Teargarden by Kaleidyscope
"Owata"	2011	—	—	—	—	—	—	—	Teargarden by Kaleidyscope
"Blissed"	2012	—	—	—	—	—	—	—	Pisces Iscariot
"Panopticon"	2012	—	—	—	—	—	—	—	Oceania
"—" denotes releases that did not chart.

- V "Daughter" was released as a 7-inch one-sided flexi disc in subscriber copies of the April 4, 1992 issue of Reflex magazine.
- VII "Daphne Descends" was released as a promotional CD single exclusively in France.
- VIII B-side of "Perfect" written by James Iha, released as a promotional cassette single.
- X "Heavy Metal Machine" was issued as a promotional cassette single prior to the release of Machina.

=== Other charted songs ===
List of songs, with selected chart positions, showing year released and album name
Song	Year	Peak chart positions						Album
Song	Year	US	US Alt	US Rock Digi.	CAN Digi.	SCO	UK	Album
"The End is the Beginning is the End (The Remixes)"	1997	—	—	—	—	—	72	Batman & Robin Soundtrack
"Doomsday Clock"	2007	97	—	—	54	—	185	Zeitgeist
"Violet Rays"	2012	—	—	27	—	—	—	Oceania
"We Only Come Out at Night"	2020	— (Note: "We Only Come Out at Night" did not enter the Billboard Hot 100, but peaked at number 4 on the LyricFind U.S. Songs Chart.)	— (Note: "We Only Come Out at Night" did not enter the Billboard Alternative Songs Chart, but peaked at number 19 on the Alternative Digital Songs Sales Chart)	20	—	92	—	Mellon Collie and the Infinite Sadness
"In Lieu of Failure"	2024	— (Note: "In Lieu of Failure" did not enter the Billboard Hot 100, but peaked at number 17 on the LyricFind U.S. Songs Chart.)	—	—	—	—	—	Atum: A Rock Opera in Three Acts
"—" denotes releases that did not chart.

== Demo albums ==
Title	Album details	Track listing
Nothing Ever Changes	Released: 1988; Format: Cassette	1. "The Vigil"; 2. "Nothing and Everything"; 3. "Holiday"; 4. "Cross"
The Smashing Pumpkins	Released: March 28, 1989; Format: Cassette	1. "Jennifer Ever"; 2. "East"; 3. "Nothing and Everything"; 4. "Sun" (remix); 5. "She" (live); 6. "Spiteface"
Moon	Released: 1989; Format: Cassette	1. "Honeyspider" (alternate); 2. "With You"; 3. "Egg"; 4. "Rhinoceros" (alternate); 5. "Bye June"; 6. "Stars Fall In"; 7. "Daughter"; 8. "Daydream"; 9. "Psychodelic"
Early 1989 Demos	Released: 1995; Format: CD	Compilation of various tracks from the three cassette-only demos from 1988 to 1989.

== Video albums ==
Title	Album details	Certifications
Vieuphoria	Released (VHS): October 4, 1994; Released (DVD): November 26, 2002; Label: Virgin	RIAA: Gold
23 Minutes^{[I]}	Label: Virgin; Format: VHS	
Greatest Hits Video Collection	Released: November 19, 2001; Label: Virgin; Format: DVD	RIAA: Gold; ARIA: Platinum; BPI: Gold; MC: Platinum
If All Goes Wrong	Released: December 1, 2008; Label: Coming Home Media; Format: 2×DVD	MC: Platinum
Oceania: Live in NYC	Released: September 24, 2013; Label: Universal Music Enterprises; Format: 2×CD+DVD; 1 Blu-ray; 1 DVD	

- I This video was a limited edition release packaged with Siamese Dream that contains the videos for "Siva", "Rhinoceros", "Cherub Rock", "Today", and "Disarm".

== Music videos ==
Year	Song	Director	Album
1991	"Siva"	Angela Conway	Gish
1991	"Rhinoceros"	Angela Conway	Gish
1992	"I Am One"^{[I]}	Kevin Kerslake	Gish
1993	"Cherub Rock"	Kevin Kerslake	Siamese Dream
1993	"Today"	Stéphane Sednaoui	Siamese Dream
1994	"Disarm"	Jake Scott	Siamese Dream
1994	"Rocket"	Jonathan Dayton and Valerie Faris	Siamese Dream
1995	"Bullet with Butterfly Wings"	Samuel Bayer	Mellon Collie And The Infinite Sadness
1996	"1979"	Jonathan Dayton and Valerie Faris	Mellon Collie And The Infinite Sadness
1996	"Zero"	Yelena Yemchuk	Mellon Collie And The Infinite Sadness
1996	"Tonight, Tonight"	Jonathan Dayton and Valerie Faris	Mellon Collie And The Infinite Sadness
1996	"Thirty-Three"	Billy Corgan and Yelena Yemchuk	Mellon Collie And The Infinite Sadness
1997	"The End Is the Beginning Is the End"	Jonathan Dayton and Valerie Faris^{[II]}	Batman & Robin soundtrack
1998	"Ava Adore"	Dom and Nic	Adore
1998	"Perfect"	Jonathan Dayton and Valerie Faris	Adore
2000	"The Everlasting Gaze"	Jonas Åkerlund	Machina/The Machines of God
2000	"Stand Inside Your Love"	W.I.Z.	Machina/The Machines of God
2000	"Try, Try, Try"	Jonas Åkerlund	Machina/The Machines of God
2001	"Untitled"	Bart Lipton	Rotten Apples
2001	"Untitled" (Studio Version)	Bart Lipton	Rotten Apples
2007	"Tarantula"	P. R. Brown	Zeitgeist
2007	"That's the Way (My Love Is)"	P. R. Brown	Zeitgeist
2008	"Superchrist"	Justin Coloma	non-album single
2008	"G.L.O.W."	Justin Coloma	non-album single
2011	"Owata"	Robby Starbuck	Teargarden by Kaleidyscope
2015	"Being Beige"	Brad Palmer and Brian Palmer	Monuments to an Elegy
2015	"Drum + Fife"	Jimmy Allhander and Robin Antiga	Monuments to an Elegy
2015	"Run2me"	Linda Strawberry	Monuments to an Elegy
2018	"Solara"	Nick Koenig	Shiny and Oh So Bright, Vol. 1 / LP: No Past. No Future. No Sun.
2018	"Silvery Sometimes (Ghosts)"	Billy Corgan	Shiny and Oh So Bright, Vol. 1 / LP: No Past. No Future. No Sun.
2020	"Cyr"	Linda Strawberry	Cyr
2020	"Ramona"	Linda Strawberry	Cyr
2020	"Wyttch"	Charlotte Kemp Muhl	Cyr
2022	"Beguiled"	Linda Strawberry	Atum: A Rock Opera in Three Acts
2023	"Empires"	Kevin Kerslake	Atum: A Rock Opera in Three Acts
2023	"Spellbinding"	Kevin Kerslake	Atum: A Rock Opera in Three Acts
2026	"Black Stars"	Gus Black	The Hunger Games: Sunrise on the Reaping

- This music video was unreleased prior to its inclusion on 2001's Greatest Hits DVD.
- IIThis music video contains footage from Batman & Robin directed by Joel Schumacher.

An internet-only "interactive music video" was released for "The Crying Tree of Mercury" by MTV in March 2000, directed by Billy Corgan. It is no longer available through MTV's website.

== Other appearances ==
Year	Song	Release
1989	"My Dahlia" and "Sun"	Light into Dark
1991	"Jackie Blue"^{[I]}	20 Explosive Dynamic Super Smash Hit Explosions!
1992	"Drown"	Singles: Original Motion Picture Soundtrack
1993	"Glynis"	No Alternative
1994	"Spaceboy" (live, acoustic)	NME Brat Pack
1995	"Rudolph the Red-Nosed Reindeer"^{[II]} (live)	No Toys for O.J.
1996	"Sad Peter Pan"^{[III]} (with Red Red Meat)	Sweet Relief II: Gravity of the Situation
1996	"Rocket" (live, acoustic)	ONXRT: Live from the Archives Volume 3
1997	"Christmastime"	A Very Special Christmas 3
1997	"Eye"	Lost Highway soundtrack
1997	"The End Is the Beginning Is the End" and "The Beginning Is the End Is the Beginning"	Batman & Robin soundtrack
1998	"Never Let Me Down Again#Notable cover versions"^{[IV]}	For the Masses (originally released as a B-side of "Rocket")
2001	"Never Let Me Down Again"^{[IV]}	Not Another Teen Movie soundtrack
2006	"To Sheila" (live)	The Bridge School Collection, Vol.1
2007	"Doomsday Clock"	Transformers soundtrack
2007	"United States" (live)	Live Earth: The Concerts for a Climate in Crisis
2008	"Superchrist"	Fresh Cuts, Vol. 2
2009	"FOL"	Epic Lap Hyundai Genesis Coupe Super Bowl XLIII commercial
2010	"The Fellowship"	The Vampire Diaries soundtrack

I Ozark Mountain Daredevils cover

II Johnny Marks cover

III Vic Chestnutt cover

IV Depeche Mode cover

== See also ==
- List of artists who reached number one on the U.S. alternative rock chart
