= Teargarden by Kaleidyscope =

2009–14 Smashing Pumpkins album

- Cover art for the project featured on the official website

Recording by The Smashing Pumpkins
- Released: December 8, 2009 – December 9, 2014
- Recorded: September 15, 2009 – July 2014 (abandoned)
- Genres: Alternative rock; progressive rock; psychedelic rock; art rock
- Length: 139:11
- Label: Martha's Music/Rocket Science
- Producers: Billy Corgan; Kerry Brown; Bjorn Thorsrud; Howard Willing

The Smashing Pumpkins chronology
American Gothic (2008)	Teargarden by Kaleidyscope (2009)	Oceania (2012)

Singles from Teargarden by Kaleidyscope
- 1. "Widow Wake My Mind" Released: January 18, 2010; 2. "Freak" Released: July 20, 2010; 3. "Owata" Released: May 4, 2011; 4. "The Celestials" Released: June 1, 2012; 5. "Panopticon" Released: September 15, 2012; 6. "Being Beige" Released: October 20, 2014; 7. "One and All (We Are)" Released: November 5, 2014; 8. "Drum + Fife" Released: November 20, 2014; 9. "Run2Me" Released: October 22, 2015

Teargarden by Kaleidyscope is a music project by alternative rock band The Smashing Pumpkins that was started in late 2009 by frontman Billy Corgan following the second departure of original drummer Jimmy Chamberlin. The project initially was conceived as a 44-song concept album loosely inspired by the Tarot, with each song being released individually as a free download. By August 2018, after 34 tracks had been released, Corgan announced via Instagram that the project had been abandoned.

In 2009 and 2010, Corgan and new drummer Mike Byrne recorded and released two EPs, Volume 1: Songs for a Sailor and Volume 2: The Solstice Bare. Following the addition of bassist Nicole Fiorentino to the band, the band recorded two additional songs as a quartet with guitarist Jeff Schroeder, after which the free download approach was abandoned in favor of more conventional album releases. In 2012, Oceania was released as an "album-within-an-album" and was met with generally positive reviews.

In 2014, Byrne and Fiorentino exited the band, and Corgan and Schroeder began work on the final two Teargarden releases. Monuments to an Elegy, which features Tommy Lee of Mötley Crüe on drums, was released in December 2014 while its more experimental companion album Day for Night was shelved and remains unreleased. By 2018, the entire project had been scrapped.

== Project history ==
=== Announcement and "A Song for a Son" (2008–2009) ===
The Smashing Pumpkins reformed in 2006, after a six-year hiatus, releasing the studio album Zeitgeist in 2007. Although Zeitgeist went gold, which Billy Corgan considered an achievement given the state of the music industry, Corgan and drummer Jimmy Chamberlin decided in 2008 that they would not make another traditional studio album, citing changing listener habits.

In March 2009, Chamberlin left the band. Corgan held tryouts to find a replacement, eventually deciding on 19-year-old Mike Byrne. In April, Corgan laid out his vision for the new album:

[I] don't think I'm going to make albums in the old-fashioned way, meaning 12–15 songs, etc. in one small package. My desire at this point would be to release one song at a time, over a period of 2–3 years, with it all adding up to a box set/album of sorts that would also include an art movie of the album... My thinking is that if I focus on one song at a time I would approach them as beautiful, distinct paintings that would each require the attention they deserve. This would also mean I would choose what I am recording quite carefully as there would be tremendous internal pressure to get it just right, and that is the kind of pressure I like, which is to make the most beautiful thing possible.

Corgan spent much of summer 2009 in ex-Catherine member and "Superchrist" producer Kerry Brown's home studio, where Zeitgeist was recorded, recording demos for about fifty songs. In July, Corgan formed the band Spirits in the Sky to play a tribute concert to the late Sky Saxon of The Seeds. He then toured with the band, comprising Brown, Electric Prunes bassist Mark Tulin, Strawberry Alarm Clock keyboardist Mark Weitz, frequent Corgan collaborator Linda Strawberry, flautist Kevin Dippold, "Superchrist" violinist Ysanne Spevack, new Pumpkins drummer Mike Byrne, and Jane's Addiction guitarist Dave Navarro, playing covers and some of the new Pumpkins songs at several clubs in California.

This is the second Smashing Pumpkins album released for free over the Internet, the first being 2000's Machina II/The Friends & Enemies of Modern Music. Teargarden saw such a release due to Corgan's reported hope that people hear the album before dismissing it, on top of his interest in "subverting a system that works against holistic thinking when it comes to how art is made and delivered to those who might want to hear it." All of the songs were planned to be released for free as 192-kbps, DRM-free MP3 files, available from direct links on the band's website. Finally, a complete box set release is planned that will contain all of the tracks accompanied by an art film and a making-of documentary. Corgan said he was also considering a single-CD compilation of the best of the forty-four tracks.

"A Song for a Son", the first song from the project, was released December 8, 2009 to positive reviews. Rolling Stone wrote: "Nothing in Corgan's prolific recording history could have prepared us for the over five minutes of classic rock that is "A Song for a Son," which starts off with a "Stairway to Heaven"-esque riff before exploding into the rest of ZoSo's touchstones."

=== Vol. 1: Songs for a Sailor and Vol. 2: The Solstice Bare (2010) ===
On the first two EPs, Billy Corgan handled the bulk of the guitar and keyboards, with Mike Byrne on drums and Mark Tulin handling much of the bass playing. Kerry Brown played congas on "Astral Planes", and Ysanne Spevack, Linda Strawberry, and Lisa Harriton have all mentioned contributing. In these sessions, Corgan consciously focused on finding the rhythmic "groove" in the music, as opposed to focusing more heavily on elaborate production or songwriting.

The first physical EP, Teargarden by Kaleidyscope Vol. 1: Songs for a Sailor, consisting of a wooden box with the 4-song CD, a 7" vinyl record with one additional song, and a hand-carved stone obelisk, was released May 25 by Rocket Science Music. To promote Record Store Day in 2010, the band performed live at Amoeba Records, offered free blacklight posters to those who pre-ordered the first EP from their local record stores, and released two limited edition 7" singles containing the album's first four songs. "Widow Wake My Mind" was promoted as a radio single, with Corgan appearing on WKQX in Chicago and several major-market stations adding it to rotation. On April 20, 2010, the band performed the song live with an Up with People choir on The Tonight Show with Jay Leno.

Initial Teargarden by Kaleidyscope tracks received generally favorable reviews. Spin's review of "Widow Wake My Mind" was positive, naming the song "a very pleasant surprise". Rolling Stone included it in their "hot list", calling it "[Corgan's] sweetest pop melody since Kennedy left MTV." Nokia's Inside Music review lauded the free download scheme that Billy Corgan has implemented: "I'm completely stunned that tunes of this quality are up for grabs free for the anticipated 5 year duration of this project." The review continued, praising the maturing drumming of Mike Byrne: "It's worth pointing out that 19–20 year old drummer Mike Byrne is beginning to show signs that he may well be capable of filling the horrific void of Jimmy Chamberlin's departure".

After completing work on the then-unreleased second EP, the band recruited new bassist Nicole Fiorentino. While "Widow Wake My Mind" failed to chart, the follow-up single, "Freak" was released on July 20, 2010, and reached #27 on the Billboard Alternative chart and #34 on the Rock Songs chart. Also in July, the band launched an American tour, and went on to tour several continents throughout 2010, playing songs from the new album and promoting the free downloads. On October 12, 2010, "The Fellowship" was released on the television soundtrack for The Vampire Diaries.

The second EP, Teargarden by Kaleidyscope, Vol. 2: The Solstice Bare, which was named after a lyric in their song "Tom Tom", was released on November 23, 2010 in the form of a cardboard box with the 4-song CD in a letterpressed sleeve and a 12" vinyl picture disc with all four EP tracks and a b-side. Jon Stone of American Songwriter reacted positively to the second EP, The Solstice Bare, stating that "The songs are not mind blowing, but for once, Billy doesn't seem like he is trying to prove his relevance to both old and new fans on every track. Respect is given to the song, rather than just the hook—quite an accomplishment from one of the most prolific and talented of hook writers."

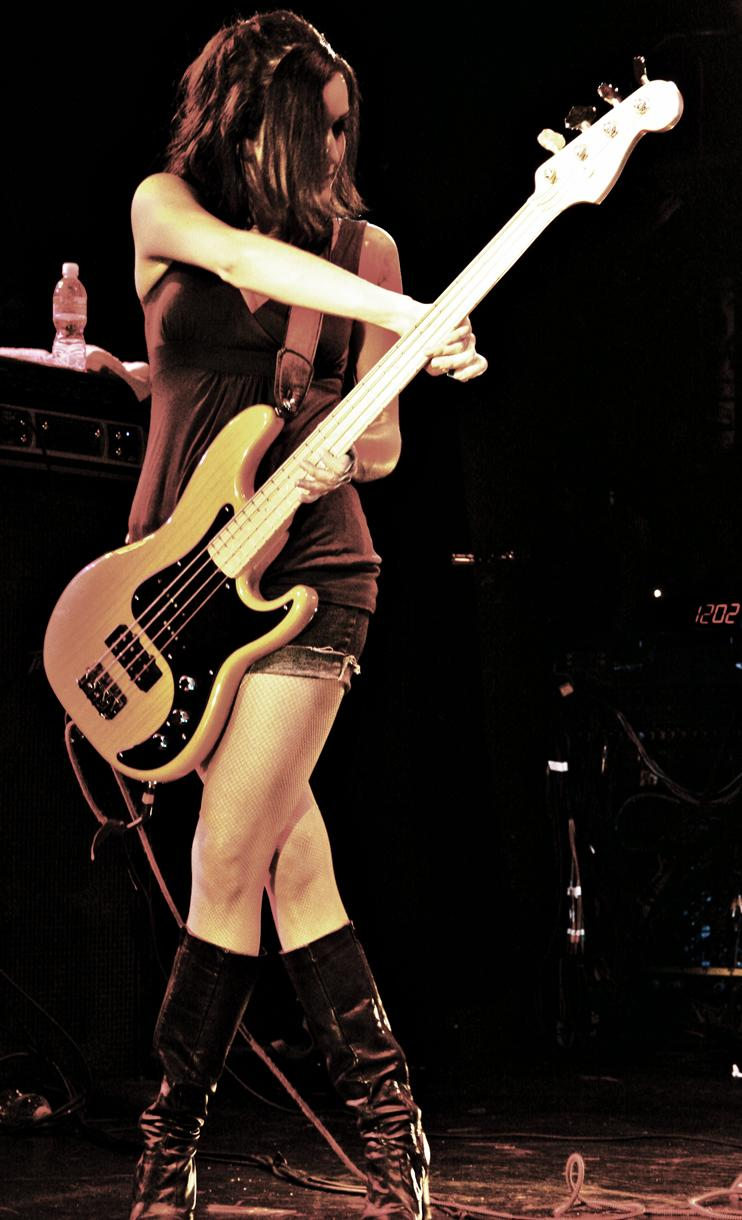
Nicole Fiorentino began contributing to Teargarden after the band's 2010 tour

=== Stand-alone songs and Oceania (2011–2012) ===
"The Fellowship", from the second EP, was released for free January 12, 2011 via the band's website. The band, including Jeff Schroeder on guitar, recorded two further songs as a group, "Lightning Strikes" and "Owata". On March 17, 2011, "Lightning Strikes" was made available for free streaming on Rolling Stone's website. The song was made available for download the following day on March 18, 2011, on the band's website. On May 3, 2011 the band released "Owata" for streaming on LA Weekly.com. A music video for the single was directed by Robby Starbuck, and will be first released as a 12-minute film on Yahoo! Music, June 29, 2011 at 9:00 PM Pacific. It is the first video to use a Red Epic-M camera.

Before the third volume could be completed, the band decided to rework the project. In April, Corgan announced that the entire lineup would now record a full-length "album-within-an-album" as part of the Teargarden project, to be titled Oceania. Released in spring 2012, the album's arrival meant that just over half of the planned project had been released. The switch back to the album format had to do with both artistic interests and promotional intentions. Oceania, while part of Teargarden by Kaleidyscope, was largely reviewed as a separate entity. It received generally positive reviews.

Despite the release and success of Oceania, Corgan said he remained dedicated to finishing Teargarden as a whole. But when asked in June 2012 whether he would return to the original release format, Corgan stated that he was "kind of mulling that around":

We definitely want to do another album. We're already talking about starting to do some demos in August. It's tough. I do want to put out some of this stuff that I'm sitting on. I do want to finish the project as I sort of originally sketched out. But right now we're riding a wave and I'm not really sure where that wave takes us.

=== Monuments to an Elegy, Day for Night, abandonment (2014–2018) ===
The Smashing Pumpkins' album Monuments to an Elegy (2014) and the planned Day for Night conclude the Teargarden by Kaleidyscope project. The original plan was for Monuments to an Elegy to be a pop/rock album and then be followed by an experimental "weird, arty" album, Day for Night. Corgan was unsure when Teargarden by Kaleidyscope would be packaged as a box set, as originally planned. In 2014, Corgan said he was uncertain for the future of the band after the completion of the Teargarden project.

In 2015, Corgan said, "Originally it was going to be forty-four songs, but now it's going to be more like sixty, eighty. There's a lot of demos that are release-worthy, but I don't want to be Don Quixote, rushing forward with my box set to an audience of no one. Maybe I'll let it marinate. See how it feels in ten years' time."

The perceived lukewarm response to Monuments to an Elegy caused Corgan to change his plans for Day for Night. Critics' reviews of Monuments to an Elegy, which holds a rating of 70/100 at Metacritic based on 31 reviews, were criticized by Corgan for being "middling, muddling" reviews and not offering a "fair" evaluation of the album, while also admitting he did not even read any of the reviews. Corgan said: "I thought for sure I would get really strong reviews for our new album Monuments to an Elegy, based on all the feedback I was getting. But I'm getting the same reviews I got back in the day, these kind of middling, muddling reviews that just won't fucking say: 'This is a fucking brilliant album from a brilliant artist,'" and also elaborated that, "It's not a three-star fucking record. Nobody believes it's a three-star record. Nobody! OK, these people obviously did, so maybe I shouldn't be so absolute. But I've been in this business for 25 years and there is nobody in it who believes this is a three-star record. Nobody!" By August 2018, Corgan had announced the abandonment of the Teargarden project as a whole.

== Concept and sound ==
Billy Corgan said that he was inspired to write a story based 'the Fool's Journey' from the Tarot. Corgan has explained his interpretation of this view: "There's childlike innocence when you just don't really know anything in the world and it all seems sort of big and magical...the teen, aware but not really liking what's going on...the third person that's cynical, where you get kind of bitter because you feel so small and there's all these things that are sort of happening and there's not much you can do about it...the fourth stage out of that would be finding a sort of spiritual place within yourself where you can live in reality, you can see it for what it is, but maybe you can find a deeper source of inspiration and peace." In other words, the album finds Corgan "looking past, present and future all at the same time and trying to have that perspective".

Corgan said he considered the sound a return to the Pumpkins' "psychedelic roots", and described it as "atmospheric, melodic, heavy, and pretty". His stated goal for the entire album was to create "a whole new exciting Smashing Pumpkins sound that is compatible with the old sound but is wholly different". Corgan feels an "affinity" between the new material and the first few Smashing Pumpkins albums, not because of a conscious effort, but because he was again enjoying that style. He envisioned an "acoustic" period and an "experimental" period later in the album's creation. He acknowledged a Donovan influence on the sitar-tinged "A Stitch in Time".

The band recorded using a combination of analog tape and Pro Tools in Corgan's home studio in Chicago, with production duties handled primarily by Corgan with Kerry Brown and Bjorn Thorsrud, both veterans of earlier Pumpkins recordings. Co-producer Kerry Brown explained the mindset going into the recording:

[T]he goal is to treat each song sonically different to best present its palette... Billy writes a song, we record a demo, listen back and find the feeling that the song evokes and then visualize the picture that it paints.

== Track listing ==
No.	Title	MP3 release date	MP3 length	EP/LP length
Vol. 1: Songs for a Sailor May 25, 2010
1.	"A Song for a Son"	December 8, 2009	6:03	6:03
2.	"Astral Planes"	April 16, 2010	4:06	4:06
3.	"Widow Wake My Mind"	January 18, 2010	4:27	4:59
4.	"A Stitch in Time"	March 2, 2010	3:33	3:28
—	"Teargarden Theme"†	—	—	2:55
Vol. 2: The Solstice Bare November 23, 2010
1.	"The Fellowship"	January 12, 2011	3:51	3:53
2.	"Freak" (also known as "Freak U.S.A.")	July 6, 2010	3:52	3:54
3.	"Tom Tom"	November 24, 2010	4:04	4:04
4.	"Spangled"	September 14, 2010	2:30	2:32
—	"Cottonwood Symphony"†	—	—	3:05
Stand-alone songs
—	"Lightning Strikes"	March 18, 2011	3:56	—
—	"Owata"	May 4, 2011	3:39	—
Oceania June 19, 2012
1.	"Quasar"	—	—	4:55
2.	"Panopticon"	—	—	3:52
3.	"The Celestials"	—	—	3:57
4.	"Violet Rays"	—	—	4:19
5.	"My Love Is Winter"	—	—	3:32
6.	"One Diamond, One Heart"	—	—	3:50
7.	"Pinwheels"	—	—	5:43
8.	"Oceania"	—	—	9:05
9.	"Pale Horse"	—	—	4:37
10.	"The Chimera"	—	—	4:16
11.	"Glissandra"	—	—	4:06
12.	"Inkless"	—	—	3:08
13.	"Wildflower"	—	—	4:42
Monuments to an Elegy December 9, 2014
1.	"Tiberius"	—	—	3:02
2.	"Being Beige"	—	—	3:39
3.	"Anaise!"	—	—	3:33
4.	"One and All (We Are)"	—	—	3:44
5.	"Run2Me"	—	—	4:08
6.	"Drum + Fife"	—	—	3:54
7.	"Monuments"	—	—	3:30
8.	"Dorian"	—	—	3:45
9.	"Anti-Hero"	—	—	3:20
A "—" denotes a non-applicable or unknown field. A "†" denotes a vinyl bonus track that was included in the box set and not released as an MP3.

== Personnel ==
The Smashing Pumpkins

- Billy Corgan – lead vocals, guitar, keyboards, synthesizers, electric sitar, production
- Mike Byrne – drums and backing vocals (Vol. 1, 2, stand-alone songs and Oceania)
- Jeff Schroeder – guitar
- Nicole Fiorentino – bass and backing vocals (stand-alone songs and Oceania)

Additional musicians

- Kerry Brown – congas and production (vol. 1)
- Ysanne Spevack – violin, viola (Vol. 1)
- Linda Strawberry – backing vocals (Vol. 1)
- Mark Tulin – bass (Vols. 1 & 2)
- Tommy Lee – drums (Monuments to an Elegy)

Technical personnel

- Kevin Dippold – studio assistant
- Chris Lord-Alge – mixing (stand-alone songs)
- Stephen Marcussen – mastering
- Bjorn Thorsrud – production, engineering
- David Bottrill – mixing
- Bob Ludwig – mastering

== Chart performance ==
=== LPs ===
Year	LP	Chart	Peak
2012	Oceania	Billboard 200	4
2012	Oceania	Canadian Albums Chart	4
2012	Oceania	Billboard Independent Albums	1
2012	Oceania	Billboard Rock Albums	5
2014	Monuments to an Elegy	Billboard 200	33
2014	Monuments to an Elegy	Billboard Rock Albums	5
2014	Monuments to an Elegy	Billboard Alternative Albums	2
2014	Monuments to an Elegy	Billboard Independent Albums	2

=== EPs ===
Year	EP	Chart	Peak
2010	Vol. 1: Songs for a Sailor	Billboard Independent Albums	43
2010	Vol. 2: The Solstice Bare	Billboard Tastemaker Albums	16

=== Singles ===
Year	Single	EP	Chart	Peak
2010	"Freak"	Vol. 2: The Solstice Bare	Billboard Alternative Songs	27
2010	"Freak"	Vol. 2: The Solstice Bare	Billboard Rock Songs	34
2012	"The Celestials"	Oceania	Billboard Alternative Songs	28
2012	"The Celestials"	Oceania	Billboard Rock Songs	35
