= FOL =

Fol or FOL may refer to:

== People ==
- Alexander Fol (1933–2006), Bulgarian historian
- Alexandra Fol (born 1981), Bulgarian-Canadian composer
- Hermann Fol (1845–1892), Swiss zoologist

== Other uses ==
- Fol (grape), a French wine grape
- "FOL" (song), by The Smashing Pumpkins
- Figures of Light, an American proto-punk band
- First-order logic
- Flavor of Love, a television dating game show
- Folio
- Fountain of Life
- Friends of Lulu, a defunct American women's organization
- Local Workers' Federation (Federación Obrera Local), a Bolivian trade union federation
- Party Workers' Liberation Front 30 May (Papiamento: Frente Obrero Liberashon), a political party in Curaçao
