= A Song for a Son =

Song by The Smashing Pumpkins

from the album Teargarden by Kaleidyscope
- Released: December 8, 2009
- Recorded: 2009
- Genre: Art rock
- Length: 6:02
- Label: Self-released
- Songwriter: Billy Corgan
- Producers: Kerry Brown, Billy Corgan, Bjorn Thorsrud

"A Song for a Son" is a 2009 song by the alternative rock band The Smashing Pumpkins. It was the first track released from Teargarden by Kaleidyscope, Vol. 1: Songs for a Sailor from the band's 8th album Teargarden by Kaleidyscope.

== Recording and composition ==
The song contains an extended guitar solo, inspired by Jimi Hendrix and Jimmy Page, recorded live by Billy Corgan. Written on an acoustic guitar, Corgan left the meaning of the song vague, but later realized it has a lot to do with his relationship with his father. Corgan consciously set the song in 1975, the year he started listening heavily to rock music, considering Hendrix, Led Zeppelin, UFO, and Rainbow influences on the sound.

== Reception ==
Rolling Stone, after the release of "A Song for a Son" wrote, "Nothing in Corgan’s prolific recording history could have prepared us for the over five minutes of classic rock that is “A Song for a Son,” which starts off with a “Stairway to Heaven”-esque riff before exploding into the rest of ZoSo’s touchstones... If “A Song for a Son” is any indication of what we can expect from 'Billy', each EP will likely be the length of Exile on Main Street".

Ryan Dombal of the online magazine Pitchfork Media described "A Song for a Son" "an epic" saying that "There's a contemplative intro, a shredding solo, and plenty of classic rock panache in between". Matthew Perpetua of Pitchfork gave the song a 2 out of 10, saying the song "is not awful so much as it is bloated and dreary. It has all the signifiers of a big, serious art-rock ballad, but there's nothing to it but empty gestures."

The song was also reviewed by About.com's Tim Grierson, who calls Corgan "charitable with Teargarden by Kaleidyscope": "Led by a stately piano figure reminiscent of Adore, "A Song for a Son" eventually introduces electric guitars into the mix, climaxing with an ecstatic solo. Overall, it's a moody, vaguely psychedelic number that's a promising start to this ambitious, unconventional, and awesome album.

== Personnel ==
Musicians

- Mike Byrne – drums
- Billy Corgan – vocals, guitar, keyboards, production
- Mark Tulin – bass guitar

Technical personnel

- Kerry Brown – production
- Stephen Marcussen – mastering
- Bjorn Thorsrud – production, engineering
