= TBK =

TBK may refer to:

- The Black Keys
- "The" Brian Kendrick
- The Brothers Karamazov
- TANK-binding kinase 1
- Teargarden by Kaleidyscope
- The Big Kahuna (film)
- Funnelbeaker culture or TBK (German: Trichter(-rand-)becherkultur), an archaeological culture in north-central Europe.
- To Be Kind, the 13th studio album by Swans

Tbk may stand for

- terbuka ("open"), a suffix for Indonesian companies indicating a publicly traded company at the Jakarta Stock Exchange
