= Astral plane (disambiguation) =

The astral plane is a non-physical, spiritual plane of existence.

Astral plane may also refer to:

- "Astral Plane" (Adventure Time), an Adventure Time episode
- Astral Plane, a Dungeons & Dragons plane
- "Astral Planes", a song from Teargarden by Kaleidyscope by the Smashing Pumpkins
- Astral plane, a slang term for a Unicode plane above 0
