= Widow Wake My Mind =

Promotional single by The Smashing Pumpkins

from the album Teargarden by Kaleidyscope
- Released: January 18, 2010
- Recorded: 2010
- Genre: Pop rock
- Length: 4:59
- Label: Self-released
- Songwriter(s): Billy Corgan
- Producer(s): Kerry Brown; Billy Corgan; Bjorn Thorsrud

Alternate cover
- Promotional CD cover

"Widow Wake My Mind" is a 2010 song by the alternative rock band The Smashing Pumpkins. It is the second track released from the band's 34-track music project Teargarden by Kaleidyscope. The song was released as a promotional CD single for radio play and was added to the rotation of several major-market stations. Additionally, the band performed the song live with an Up With People choir on The Tonight Show with Jay Leno on April 20, 2010, to promote the Songs for a Sailor EP release.

== Critical reception ==
The song received mixed reviews. William Goodman of Spin gave it a positive review, describing it as "a well-crafted pop-rock song with spare piano interludes, never-overbearing drums, and a big, song-capping vocal with polished guitar solos." According to Goodman, the song opens with a funk-inspired jangly guitar riff and drops into a bass guitar and keyboard section, accompanying Billy Corgan's nasal singing. He also praised Mike Byrne's drumming skills. Nevertheless, Sean Highkin of Beats Per Minute panned the song. He wrote that "Widow” is clearly trying to be a guitar-driven anthem in the “Zero”/”Here is No Why” vein, but the annoyingly clean production makes it sound like a rejected Zeitgeist Best Buy bonus track." He also criticized Byrne's drumming in contrast to Goodman and called the song as "worse Mellon Collie disc-two duds like “X.Y.U.”." The Wall Street Journal also indicated that the song has a "mid-career Beatles-like feel, with a bright melody and expansive production."

The song was also compared to D'yer Mak'er by Led Zeppelin.

== Personnel ==
Musicians

- Mike Byrne – drums
- Billy Corgan – vocals, guitar, keyboards
- Mark Tulin – bass guitar

Technical personnel

- Kerry Brown – production
- Stephen Marcussen – mastering
- Bjorn Thorsrud – production, engineering
