= Owata =

Single by The Smashing Pumpkins

from the album Teargarden by Kaleidyscope
- Released: May 4, 2011
- Recorded: 2011
- Genre: Alternative rock
- Length: 3:39
- Label: Martha's Music / Rocket Science
- Songwriter: Billy Corgan

The Smashing Pumpkins singles chronology
"Freak" (2010)	"Owata" (2011)	"The Celestials" (2012)

"Owata" is the second single from The Smashing Pumpkins' aborted music project, Teargarden by Kaleidyscope, and tenth song released from the project.

== History ==
The song has a fairly long history prior to its official release. The song was performed, for the first time, on The Chris Isaak Hour on April 4, 2009, when Jimmy Chamberlin was still in the band. Subsequently, it was performed throughout 2009 with Billy Corgan's Sky Saxon-inspired supergroup, Spirits in the Sky, which featured future Smashing Pumpkins drummer Mike Byrne. As well, the song was performed with the Smashing Pumpkins throughout 2010, prior to its official release on Teargarden by Kaleidyscope. These early live versions are considerably different musically than the final studio version, with the studio version featuring a different drum arrangement, and a noticeably larger amount of synthesizers.

== Music video ==
A 12-minute short film featuring an in-depth look at two female underground wrestlers was released in July 2011. The video, directed by Robby Starbuck and stars Shelly Martinez, Raven and Alissa Flash, was subsequently edited and released in a traditional music video format.

== Critical reception ==
One Thirty BPM rated "Owata" 5/10, calling it "a sleekly produced pop-rocker characterized by acoustic guitar melodies and upbeat synths straight out of the 80s" and "a pleasant song and an admirable effort, but it’s a little too glossy and not quite catchy enough to achieve the anthemic heights for which it aims."
