= Hot Saki & Bedtime Stories =

Studio album by Catherine
- Released: September 17, 1996
- Recorded: The Farm, Michigan
- Genre: Alternative rock
- Length: 52:39
- Label: TVT
- Producer: Catherine

Catherine chronology
Sorry! (1994)	Hot Saki & Bedtime Stories (1996)

Singles from Hot Saki & Bedtime Stories
- 1. "Four Leaf Clover" Released: 1997; 2. "Whisper" Released: 1997

Hot Saki & Bedtime Stories is the second and final studio album by American alternative rock band Catherine. It was released on September 17, 1996, through TVT Records. D'arcy Wretzky of The Smashing Pumpkins, drummer Kerry Brown's wife at the time, contributed vocals on the record.

The song "Four Leaf Clover" was released as a single, and another song, "Whisper," was contributed to the soundtrack of the film Scream.

== Critical reception ==
Professional ratings
Review scores
Source	Rating
AllMusic	4/5 stars

In their retrospective review, AllMusic called it "an even more varied and generally successful package" than their previous studio album, Sorry!

== Track listing ==
All tracks are written by Keith Brown, Kerry Brown, and Mark Rew, except "Cotton Candy High," written by Kerry Brown and Rew.

No.	Title	Length
1.	"Whisper"	3:11
2.	"It's Gonna Get Worse"	3:33
3.	"Cotton Candy High"	3:22
4.	"Milkshake"	3:39
5.	"Four Leaf Clover"	3:31
6.	"Vegas Glam"	3:21
7.	"Punch Me Out"	3:19
8.	"Make Me Smile"	3:53
9.	"Blacklight"	4:38
10.	"Don't Touch Me There"	3:44
11.	"Sign of the Cross"	2:58
12.	"The Angels"	3:50
13.	"Pink Floyd Poster"	6:25
14.	"Good Luck Charm"	3:15

== Music videos ==
- "Four-Leaf Clover" (1996)
- "Whisper" (1996)

== Personnel ==
Catherine

- Keith Brown – bass guitar
- Kerry Brown – drums
- Mark Rew – vocals

Additional personnel

- Jerome Brown – guitar on track 6
- Chris Connelly – backing vocals on track 11
- Fever – backing vocals and guitar on track 2
- Neil Jendon – backing vocals and trombone on track 6
- Marina Peterson – cello on tracks 9 and 12
- Todd Tatnall – timpani on track 4
- D'arcy Wretzky – vocals on tracks 5 and 7

Production

- Kerry Brown – mixing on tracks 1, 2, 4, 6, 8, 10, 11, 13, and 14
- Catherine – production, recording
- Chris Hayback – additional engineering
- Neil Jendon – guitar on tracks 1, 4, 6, 8, 11, 13, and 14
- David Kahne – mixing on tracks 3, 5, 7, 9, and 12
- Jeff Lane – mixing on track 2
- Steve Spapperi – mixing on tracks 1, 4, 6, 8, and 13
- Todd Tatnall – additional engineering
