= Monuments to an Elegy =

Studio album by the Smashing Pumpkins
- Released: December 9, 2014
- Recorded: March–July 2014
- Genres: Alternative rock; pop rock; synth-pop
- Length: 32:35
- Label: Martha's Music
- Producers: Billy Corgan; Howard Willing; Jeff Schroeder

The Smashing Pumpkins chronology
| Oceania (2012) | Monuments to an Elegy (2014) | Shiny and Oh So Bright, Vol. 1 / LP: No Past. No Future. No Sun. (2018) |

Singles from Monuments to an Elegy
- 1. "Being Beige" Released: October 20, 2014; 2. "One and All (We Are)" Released: November 5, 2014; 3. "Drum + Fife" Released: November 20, 2014; 4. "Run2me" Released: October 23, 2015

Monuments to an Elegy is the ninth studio album by American alternative rock band the Smashing Pumpkins, released on December 9, 2014, on Martha's Music. Band leader Billy Corgan noted that—like the band's previous release, Oceania—the album is part of the 34-track music project, Teargarden by Kaleidyscope. It turned out to be the last part of the series due to cancellation of the project in 2018. Corgan and guitarist Jeff Schroeder recorded the album as a duo, with drums performed by guest Tommy Lee . This was the band’s last album before the return of original guitarist James Iha in 2018 and drummer Jimmy Chamberlin in 2015.

The album received generally positive reviews from music critics, but sold poorly compared to the band's previous albums, peaking at number 33 in the U.S. and number 59 in the U.K., thus making it (at the time) their lowest charting album in both regions since their debut, Gish (1991).

== Background ==
On March 25, 2014, the band announced that they had signed a record deal with record label BMG. The band's next two albums would be part of the deal: Monuments to an Elegy and Day for Night.

On April 29, The Smashing Pumpkins' frontman Billy Corgan stated that the band had chosen the top songs for the album, and that they would be spending the following three days on drum tracking, vocal arrangements, lyrics and tweaking of the songs. Corgan described the album's planned sound as being "guitars, guitars, guitars, and more guitars; but more so on the epic side of things than say, grossly metallic."

On May 7, it was announced that Tommy Lee, founding member of Mötley Crüe, would be playing drums on all nine of the album's tracks. According to Corgan, Jeff Schroeder was the only person apart from himself officially in the Smashing Pumpkins, and that Mike Byrne and Nicole Fiorentino were no longer working with the group in any capacity.

On July 21, Billy Corgan indicated that recording on Monuments to an Elegy had finished. Mixing for the album commenced on August 18. The album's final release date was announced as December 9.

To the suggestion that Monuments… is "a very Smashing Pumpkins-like album", Corgan responded, "I think people are hearing an emotional quality that reminds them of something in the past. By extension, they assume I'm trying to get back there. But the truth is the opposite – I stopped trying to avoid it. I went off to have this Hermann Hesse-style spiritual journey through different sounds and subcultures. And then I came home, and allowed myself to make the music I might naturally make."

== Release and promotion ==
The album's first single, "Being Beige", was premiered on SoundCloud on October 20. On November 4, it was revealed that the album's next single would be "One and All", and that it would be released on November 5.

On November 17, it was announced that, by preordering the album through participating record stores, you can get a free Monuments to an Elegy sampler, which includes the two previously released singles and the as-of-yet not released "Tiberius". Later that day, "Tiberius" was premiered on Vice.

On November 20, it was announced that the album's next single would be "Drum + Fife", which was released on November 21.

On December 2, one week before the physical release, the album was made available for full streaming on iTunes Radio.

The band toured in support of the album starting on November 26, with Rage Against the Machine's Brad Wilk filling in on drums and The Killers' Mark Stoermer filling in on bass, although Corgan indicated that Wilk and Stoermer may only play at a select set of early shows in their tour.

The band promoted the album on Jimmy Kimmel Live! on December 10, 2014. They played lead single "Being Beige".

== Reception ==
Professional ratings
Aggregate scores
| Source | Rating |
|---|---|
| AnyDecentMusic? | 6.6/10 |
| Metacritic | 70/100 |
Review scores
| Source | Rating |
| AllMusic | 4/5 stars |
| Chicago Tribune | 3/4 stars |
| Classic Rock | 8/10 stars |
| Consequence of Sound | B− |
| DIY | 4/5 stars |
| The Guardian | 3/5 stars |
| NME | 7/10 |
| Pitchfork | 6.0/10 |
| Rolling Stone | 3/5 stars |
| Uncut | 8/10 |

The album earned generally positive reviews. At Metacritic, which assigns a normalized rating out of 100 to reviews from mainstream critics, it holds an average score of 70 out of 100, which indicates "generally favorable", based on 31 reviews.

"Nine ass-booting pop metal bullets with SR-71 Blackbird wings," marvelled Classic Rock. "It's not just the most svelte, direct and immediate Pumpkins album ever, it's the most misleadingly titled – these are no funeral dirges, but songs of redemption, recovery and romance, drizzled with synth-pop and hooks that could send Cloverfield to the canvas."

DIY stated the album "...is certainly the easiest Pumpkins record to listen to since their original reformation in 2006. It acts as something of a midpoint in sound between Siamese Dream and 2003's Zwan album, Mary Star of the Sea. This brevity helps to make it such an effortless listen." Rolling Stone's Kory Grow described it as a "deep dive into synth pop", and "a surprise" yet authentic because of "Corgan's characteristically acid vocals".

== Track listing ==
All tracks are written by Billy Corgan.

| No. | Title | Length |
|---|---|---|
| 1. | "Tiberius" | 3:02 |
| 2. | "Being Beige" | 3:39 |
| 3. | "Anaise!" | 3:33 |
| 4. | "One and All (We Are)" | 3:44 |
| 5. | "Run2me" | 4:08 |
| 6. | "Drum + Fife" | 3:54 |
| 7. | "Monuments" | 3:30 |
| 8. | "Dorian" | 3:45 |
| 9. | "Anti-Hero" | 3:20 |
| Total length: | | 32:35 |

== Personnel ==
=== The Smashing Pumpkins ===
- Billy Corgan – vocals, guitar, bass guitar, keyboards and synthesizers
- Jeff Schroeder – guitar

=== Additional musicians ===
- Tommy Lee – drums
- Sstaria (Sheri Shaw) – backing vocals on "Anaise!"

=== Production ===
- David Bottrill – mixing
- Nikola Dokic – 2nd Engineer
- Smiley Sean – 2nd Engineer
- Jonathan DeRing – Assistant Engineer
- Howie Weinberg – mastering
- Sam Wiewel – 2nd Engineer
- Howard Willing – production

== Charts ==
| Chart (2014) | Peak position |
|---|---|
| Australian Albums (ARIA) | 55 |
| Belgian Albums (Ultratop Flanders) | 136 |
| Belgian Albums (Ultratop Wallonia) | 142 |
| Dutch Albums (Album Top 100) | 94 |
| German Albums (Offizielle Top 100) | 62 |
| Italian Albums (FIMI) | 95 |
| Irish Albums (IRMA) | 83 |
| Scottish Albums (Official Charts) | 60 |
| Swiss Albums (Schweizer Hitparade) | 33 |
| UK Albums (Official Charts) | 59 |
| UK Independent Albums (Official Charts) | 3 |
| US Billboard 200 | 33 |
| US Independent Albums (Billboard) | 1 |
| US Top Alternative Albums (Billboard) | 2 |
| US Top Rock Albums (Billboard) | 6 |
