= Sorry! (album) =

Studio album by Catherine
- Released: November 1, 1994
- Recorded: Soundworks, Chicago
- Genre: Alternative rock
- Label: TVT
- Producer: Catherine

Catherine chronology
Sleepy (1993)	Sorry! (1994)	Hot Saki & Bedtime Stories (1996)

Singles from Sorry!
- 1. "Songs About Girls" Released: 1994

Professional ratings
Review scores
Source	Rating
AllMusic	4/5 stars

Sorry! is the debut studio album by American alternative rock band Catherine. It was released on November 1, 1994, through TVT Records.

== Critical reception ==
The Washington Post wrote: "The motto on the front of Catherine's Sorry -- 'better living through noise' -- seems about as dated as the sound of this Chicago quintet." Chicago Reader called it "pleasant but not ground breaking."

== Track listing ==
All tracks are written by Jerome Brown, Kerry Brown, Cliff Fox, Neil Jendon, and Mark Rew, except where noted.

No.	Title	Writer(s)	Length
1.	"Songs About Girls"		2:59
2.	"Funny Bunny"		3:11
3.	"Every Christian Lionhearted Man Will Show You"	Barry Gibb, Robin Gibb, Maurice Gibb	3:12
4.	"Her Pills"		3:53
5.	"2 am"	Jendon	3:57
6.	"Saint"		4:09
7.	"Inchworm"		6:29
8.	"Broken Bunny Bird"		4:26
9.	"Doll House"		4:39
10.	"Sorry"		3:05
11.	"Flawless"		3:05
12.	"Waterfall"		12:05

== Personnel ==
Catherine

- Jerome Brown – bass guitar, guitar
- Kerry Brown – drums, guitar, percussion
- Cliff Fox – bass guitar, guitar
- Neil Jendon – guitar, keyboards, slide guitar, vocals
- Mark Rew – guitar, vocals

Additional personnel

- Bobby English – guitar
- Eric Remschneider – cello on tracks 5 and 7
- John Siket – banjo, guitar
- Lawrence Whipple – guitar

Production

- Kerry Brown – engineering, mixing at Smart Studios, Madison, Wisconsin, recording at Soundworks, Chicago
- Jeff Burk – engineering assisting
- Catherine – production
- Bobby English – amplifiers, guitar technician
- Greg Knoll – sleeve art direction
- Jeff Moleski – engineering, recording
- John Siket – mixing at Smart Studios, Madison, Wisconsin
- Jim Stallman – additional percussion on tracks 4, 9, and 11
- Mark Tremblay – engineering assisting
- Howie Weinberg – mastering at Masterdisk, New York City
