= Philip Clemo =

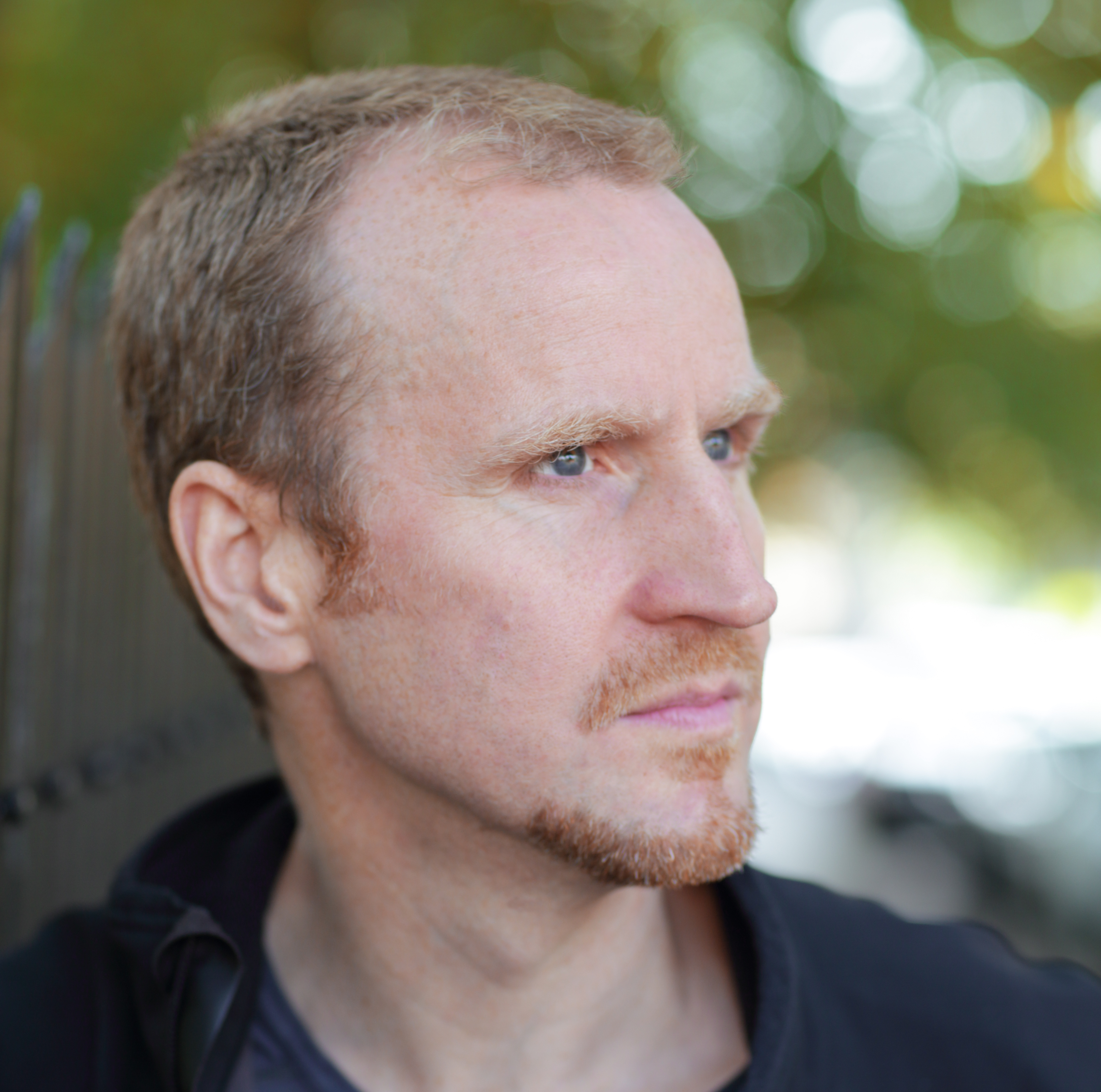
- Philip Clemo, Glasgow 2012 by Colin Gray

Background information
- Born: Philip James Clemo; 3 August 1964 (age 62); Insch, Aberdeenshire, Scotland
- Genres: Classical, jazz, atmospheric, ambient, electronic, experimental rock
- Occupations: Composer, film maker, artist
- Instruments: Voice, guitar, piano, keyboards
- Years active: Music: 1997–present Film: 1989–present
- Labels: All Colours Arts, Metier
- Website: www.philipclemo.com

Philip Clemo is a British composer, musician, producer, sound artist, performer, filmmaker and visual artist, described by Propermusic.com as one of contemporary music's most innovative artists.

== Early life ==
Philip James Clemo was born on 3 August 1964 in Insch, Aberdeenshire, Scotland.

In his teens Clemo studied guitar with Scottish singer-songwriter Iain MacDonald. Whilst Clemo was listening to the likes of Patti Smith, Television and Talking Heads, MacDonald introduced him to a different generation of artists including Nick Drake, Tim Buckley, Van Morrison and Jimi Hendrix. Clemo began performing in North East Scotland folk clubs mainly accompanying singers with acoustic guitar.

== Developed style ==
Moving to London in 1982, influenced by the works of guitarists Robin Guthrie of The Cocteau Twins and Tom Verlaine of Television, Clemo began recording his own work. He put together a short-lived experimental music band 'Box in the Sun', but left to explore his solo projects.

He developed a complex and multi-layered approach, creating music which always sounds fresh to the listener. He builds soundworlds from diverse sources including field recordings made in locations such as: the crowded streets of New Delhi; the dense insect soundscapes of the Malaysian rainforest; Sydney building sites; Icelandic mud pools; and glass and metal workshops. In the studio Clemo builds complex and densely textured compositions, developing them through a process of composition and improvisation, with contributions from a diverse group of musicians. During the final stages he extensively reconfigures, interweaving instrumental, vocal and recorded material, disguising origin and cultural references. The result is a mix of musical genres, crossing between jazz, post-rock, contemporary classical, krautrock and electronica, described as "finely crafted shimmering matrices of sound" and creating something which is "mesmeric and completely addictive".

== Musical career ==
=== Sound – Inhale the Colours ===
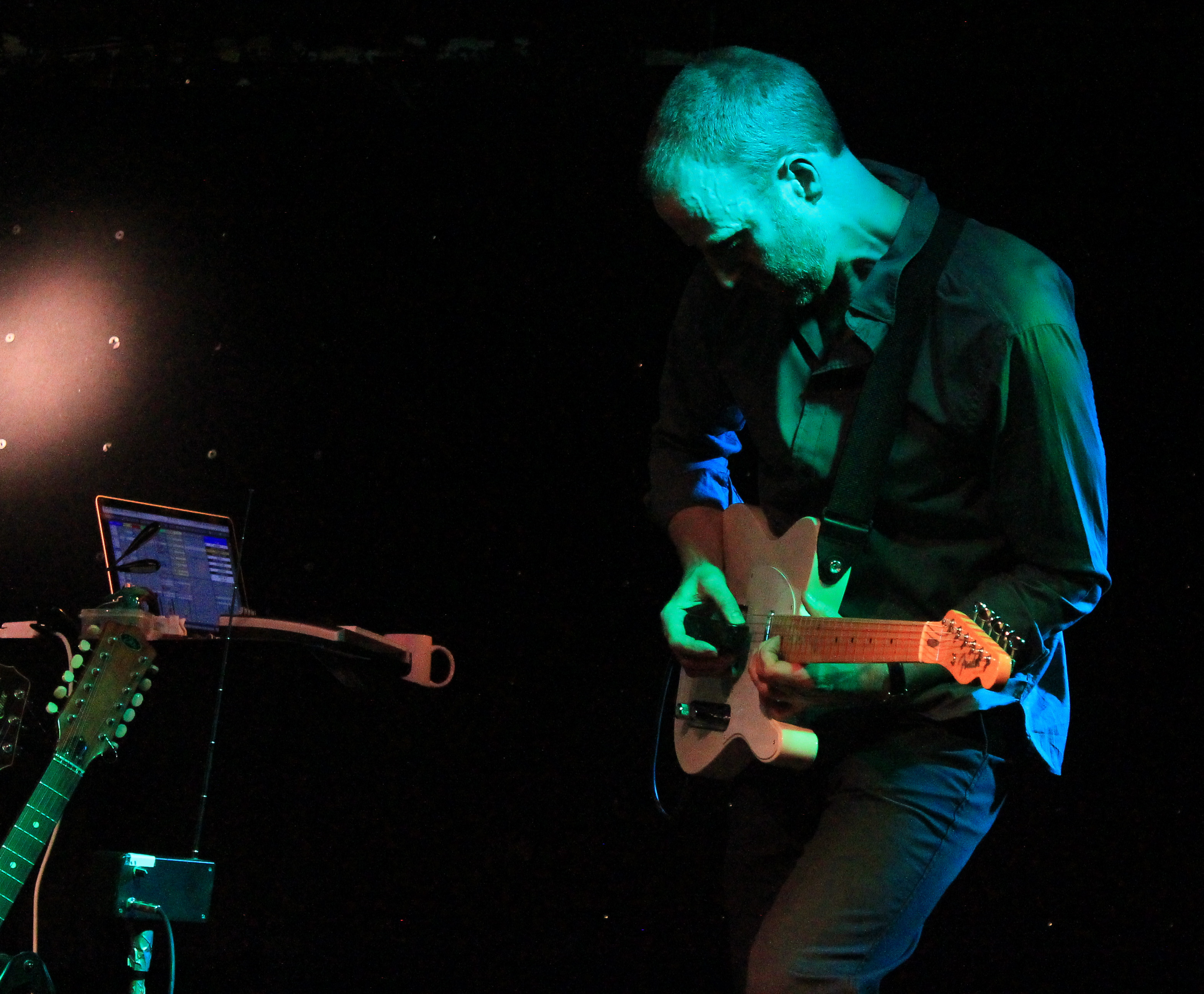
Philip Clemo live, 2017

Clemo's first two albums were collaborative works with violinist Ysanne Spevack, aka Mee. The pair shared the composition credits, but used Clemo's multi-layered approach to creation and composition. Sound – Inhale the Colours was created in 1996/7 largely in Sydney, Australia, featuring contributions from an additional eleven musicians. Well reviewed by critics on release, it remained a question for them as to whether it was jazz, ambient electronica or World music.

=== Soundzero ===
A second collaborative album Soundzero was completed in 1999, but only released in March 2008. Both albums featured, amongst others, Phil Slater on trumpet and Tarlochan (Bobby) Singh on tabla. On Soundzero, Jazz singer Cleveland Watkiss, often heavily processed, made a guest appearance; whilst the album was also the first appearance of a British rhythm section, consisting of: Mark Sanders (drums); John Edwards (double bass); and Pete Lockett (percussion).

=== Ambiguous Dialogues ===
Clemo's third album Ambiguous Dialogues, the first under his own name, was released in 2004 on Metier Jazz. Featuring 12 musicians, as well as the British rhythm section it involved contributions from Clive Bell (reeds), and Tom Chant (soprano saxophone and bass clarinet). Clemo toured the work post the album's release, which was well reviewed and received.

During the same year, he became a judge for the first time at the British Composer Awards for The Ivors Academy, which he has since undertaken again in 2005, 2006, 2010 and 2011.

=== The Rooms ===
In October 2008, Clemo released his fourth album The Rooms. A musical progression through different sound "rooms" or "spaces", it featured 22 musicians including: Clive Bell; Theo Travis (saxophone and flute); Simon Hopkins (electric guitar); B.J Cole (pedal steel); Henry Lowther (trumpet and flugelhorn); and a Prague string quartet. Clemo credited legendary sound engineer Phill Brown, who has worked with Jimi Hendrix and Bob Marley among others, for his invaluable contribution to the recording process of The Rooms. The album was critically acclaimed, and reviewed as floating somewhere between jazz, rock and soundtrack, with critics describing it as intelligent "fourth world" electro-jazz.

=== Mesmer ===
Up to this point, one of Clemo's key instruments of choice to compose with was the guitar. But having become quite bored with what he was playing on it, he moved for his next album to the piano. For a year he created improvisations, charting a deeply personal journey through significant life experiences and environments. These were then given to pianist Kevin Pollard to interpret and expand, with Clemo then adding additional guitar pieces to shape the compositions. With the basic structure laid out, he then invited 14 additional musicians – one at a time – to "blindly" add their response on top, including: Oren Marshall (tuba); B. J. Cole (pedal steel guitar); Byron Wallen (trumpet and flugelhorn); Emily Burridge (cello); with Thomas Bloch (Radiohead, Damon Albarn) contributing ethereal tones on three instruments (glass harmonica, crystal baschet and ondes martenot). Clemo then heavily edited and shaped their contributions. The album was the first on which Clemo added his own voice, using multi-layering to create harmonies. He finally added additional recorded sounds from places which have great significance to him, including: the river and woods at the end of his childhood garden; his first school; Aberdeen railway station; Redwood National Park in northern California; and Plum Village Zen Buddhist monastery in France. As with The Rooms, most of the sessions were recorded by Phill Brown, who Clemo sees as crucial in both building powerful creative environments, and capturing a high level of sonic detail in the sessions. The result, Mesmer, was well reviewed by both the music and mainstream press, described as a form of contemporary chamber music with "improvisation, multi-level musical dialogue and sound design at its core."

=== Dream Maps ===
With contributions from 21 musicians including Arve Henriksen (trumpet), Evi Vine (voice), Byron Wallen (trumpet, flugelhorn), Oren Marshall (tuba), Thomas Bloch (glass harmonica, Ondes Martenot), Emily Burridge and Peter Gregson (cellos), Dream Maps was released on 9 September 2016 with a live launch with an 8-piece band including Arve Henriksen and Evi Vine at Kings Place, London, UK on 14 September. The concert was described by Richard Williams on thebluemoment.com as "Artfully mixed together with recordings of heartbeats and water by the sound engineer Phill Brown, the music washed gently but insistently over the clearly beguiled near-capacity crowd in Kings Place’s Hall 2... this was Clemo’s first live gig in 10 years; its success should encourage him."

Dream Maps was well received by the media with Selwyn Harris in Jazzwise describing it as "Meditative, trance-like stillness… symphonic ambience… echoes of… Brian Eno and David Sylvian. Miles’ Sketches of Spain reimagined by Jon Hassell." Grant Moon in Prog (magazine) said that "Philip Clemo gets close to the edges on his extraordinary sixth album… utterly transfixing" and George Farbey in All About Jazz said "Mesmerising… irresistible and idiosyncratic. Within a jazz context, could even be regarded as a new kind of third stream" ****

Philip Clemo discussed the making of Dream Maps on the BBC Radio 3 programme Jazz Now on 24 October 2016.

=== Through the Wave of Blue ===
Released on 1 November 2024, Through the Wave of Blue includes contributions from Arve Henriksen (trumpet), Theo Travis (soprano saxophone, flutes), Emily Burridge (cello), Simon Edwards (bass) and Martyn Barker (drums, percussion).

== Film-making ==
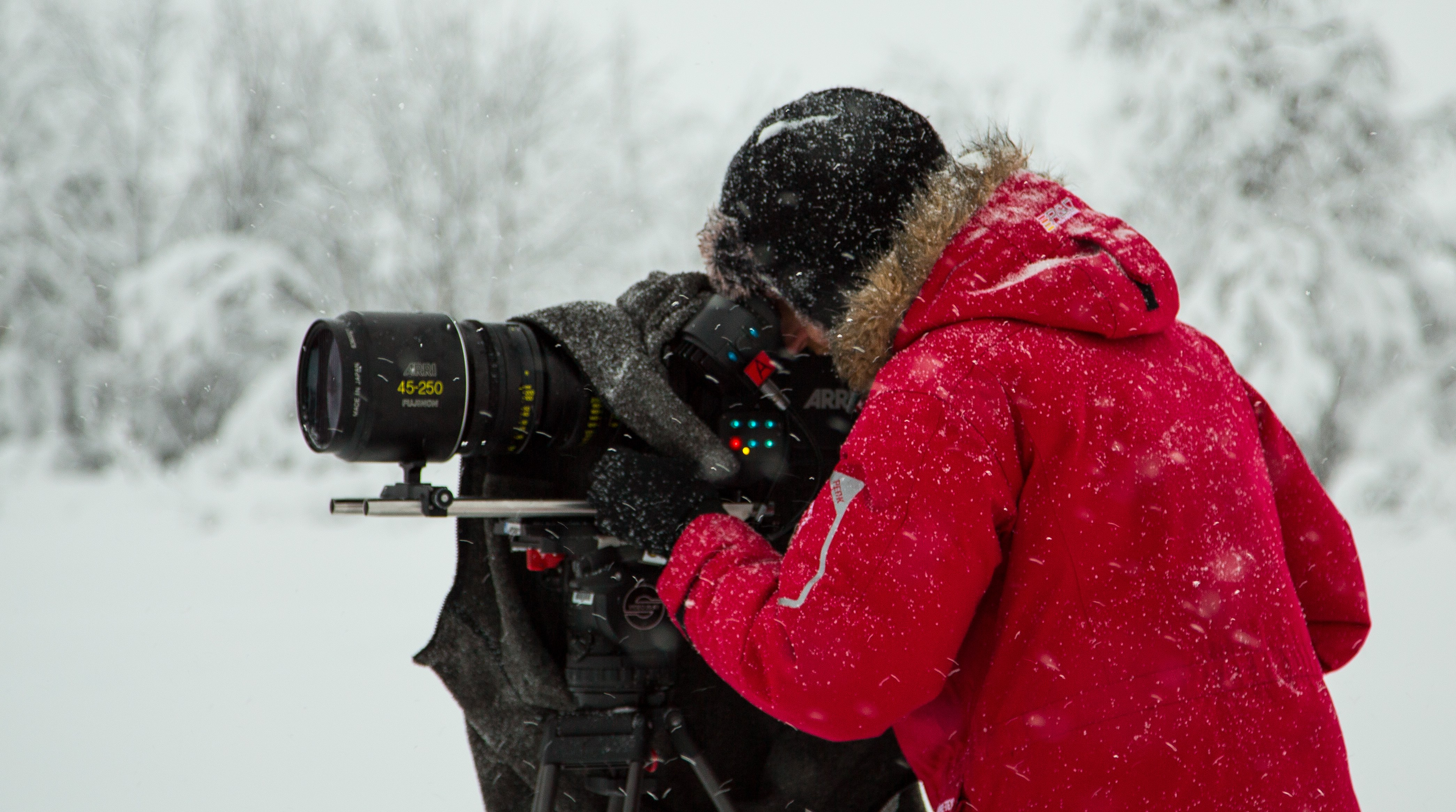
Philip Clemo filming in Norway 2013

Having started out professionally as a production film editor, including working on the BBC's Panorama, since 1989 Clemo has made a series of short films which have been shown at festivals around the world.

One of his early films was From The Morning On, a travelogue based on a day in the Indian sub-continent. He has since travelled extensively throughout South East Asia and Australasia, with both film camera and sound recording equipment. Having used video projections of his film work extensively in his live musical performances, he filmed his first major project, The Air Holds Still on My Breath in Iceland in summer 2008. Shown at Cannes Short Film Corner in 2009, the film, a series of abstract "mood paintings" mapping the "Seven Ages of Man", features music from The Rooms. It was shot using specialist camera technology to capture extreme slow motion details of geothermal activity and waterfalls, and from the air using a gyro-stabilised camera mounted on a helicopter. Shot using the same technical combination as The Air, Clemo made the short film Melt, which was shown at 2009 Reykjavik International Film Festival 2009 and 2010 London Short Film Festival.

In late 2013, Clemo developed The Breath Project, encompassing film and art installation, produced by perfectmotion and Animal Monday. Breath illustrates the dramas of human life through the metaphor of landscape, from isolation and turmoil to exhilaration and transformation. Moving through the seven phases of human life, through ageing human forms and across different terrains of the human body, we see comparisons with the environments of planet Earth. Clemo has presented TEDX and TED talks about his work on Breath.

He is currently working with Dr Thomas Moors and the charity Shout at Cancer on 'From Silence Into Song' which honours the legacy of the survivor trees of Hiroshima and Nagasaki, hooking them up to sensors exactly 75 years after the bombs were dropped, and a choir of cancer survivors who have learnt how to sing after the removal of their voiceboxes. Events around this project have taken place throughout 2025 and 2026.

== Live performance ==
Since 2016, Clemo has been performing with his Dream Maps Live band, working with a diverse group of musicians including Arve Henriksen (trumpet), Byron Wallen (trumpet, flugelhron), B. J. Cole (pedal steel), Evi Vine (voice), Simon Edwards (bass), Martyn Barker (drums, percussion), Emily Burridge (cello) and Steven Hill (guitar & keys).

== Discography ==
ALBUMS:

- Sound – Inhale the Colours, 1997, with Meena Ysanne (Ysanne Spevack)
- soundzero, 1999 (but only released in 2008), with Meena Ysanne (Ysanne Spevack)
- Ambiguous Dialogues, 2004
- The Rooms, 2008
- Mesmer, 2012
- Dream Maps, 2016
- Through the Wave of Blue, 2024

SINGLES:

- Stalker (Phil Bodger & Martyn Barker remix), 2025

== Filmography ==
- Box in the Sun, 1990
- From the Morning On, 1990
- Objects and Observations, 1993
- Thieves – Unworthy promo, 1994
- An Altered Perspective (Journeys in the East), 1995
- Metal on Water, 1999
- Separated by Shadows (shown during 2005/6 UK tour), 2005
- The Air Holds Still on My Breath (Iceland Journey), 2009
- Melt, 2009
- Sigur Rós – Fjögur Píanó, 2012
- The Mesmer vignettes, 2012
- Return, 2013
- Wide-eyed, 2013
- Orchid, 2013
- The Memory of Objects: Château de Rochebonne, France, 2014
- Water in the Flow (with Evi Vine), 2016
- Shadow Seas (with Evi Vine), 2017
- First Breath (Journeys Through the Landscapes of Life), 2018
- Lark, 2018
- Evi Vine: My Only Son, 2019
- Hayley Ross: Dernier Baiser, 2019
- Magnetic (with Arve Henriksen & Evi Vine), 2021
- Ocean (for Biophonica, music Peter Hall, sound recordings Martyn Stewart), 2024
- Arctic (for Biophonica, music Peter Hall, sound recordings Martyn Stewart), 2024
- Forest (for Biophonica, music Peter Hall, sound recordings Martyn Stewart), 2024
- Maze, 2024
- Matriarch (Glitchkase), 2025
- Dawn, 2025
- Stalker (Phil Bodger & Martyn Barker remix), 2025
