= Catherine (alternative rock band) =

American alternative rock band

- Origin: Chicago, Illinois, U.S.
- Genres: Alternative rock, grunge, indie rock, shoegazing
- Years active: 1985–1998, 2011
- Labels: Limited Potential; TVT; Scratchie Records
- Past members: Mark Rew; Kerry Brown; Keith Brown; Neil Jendon; Jerome Brown; Scott Evers; Todd Tatnall; Cliff Fox; D'arcy Wretzky

Catherine was an American alternative rock band from Chicago, Illinois, United States, that was active from 1985 to 1998. They were signed to TVT Records. Billy Corgan of The Smashing Pumpkins has credited the band with introducing him to the Big Muff, which he would later use as the basis for the Siamese Dream trademark guitar sound.

== Breakup ==
Catherine toured in 1997, opening in the United States for bands like Garbage, the Lemonheads, and also playing several large festivals in Europe, including Reading (UK), Bizarre (Cologne), and Rocknacht (Leuven). After their 1997 tour, the band began recording a new LP in the studio they built in a remodeled barn outside Watervliet, Michigan. Meanwhile, TVT Records would not return the band's phone calls. Opting out of their contract, Catherine was unable to secure a contract with another label. A total of 13 songs were written in the barn, under the name My Friend The Snake. The original sessions in the barn have only been heard by a few friends and fans of the band. Discouraged by the lack of progress in securing a new contract, Evers and Tatnall left the band, followed by Keith Brown.

Rew and Jendon reconvened in 2007 and currently play a couple of the 'lost' Catherine songs in the Chicago-based band "Bugglette", and independently released a new album, "Shame On You, Shanga Flowerdell" in late 2008

After a break from music, Jendon was a member of Zelienople for 3 years and appeared on several of their albums. In addition to playing with Bugglette, he is currently performing and recording electronic music under his own name. His first solo CD, "Invisibility", was released on BloodLust! in late 2008.

=== Reunion ===
Catherine reunited to play 2 songs during the encore of the Smashing Pumpkins show at the Riviera Theatre, in Chicago, IL on October 14, 2011 for the first time since their break up in 1998. The band had indicated they might play a full show in Chicago after this appearance, but as of 2020 there has been no further activity.

== Music videos ==
- Idiot (1994)
- It's No Lie (1994)
- Songs About Girls (1994)
- Saint (1995)
- Four-Leaf Clover (1996)
- Whisper (1996)

== Discography ==
Date of release	Title	Label
1991	Sparkle/Charmed	Limited Potential
1993	Sleepy	March Records (Re-released on TVT in 1994)
1994	Sorry!	TVT
1996	Hot Saki & Bedtime Stories	TVT
