= Run2me =

Single by The Smashing Pumpkins

from the album Monuments to an Elegy
- Released: October 22, 2015
- Recorded: 2014
- Genre: Synth-pop, alternative rock
- Length: 4:09
- Label: BMG/Martha's Music
- Songwriter: Billy Corgan
- Producers: Billy Corgan; Jeff Schroeder; Howard Willing

The Smashing Pumpkins singles chronology
"Drum + Fife" (2014)	"Run2me" (2015)	"Solara" (2018)

"Run2me" is a song by The Smashing Pumpkins, released as the fourth single from the band's ninth studio album Monuments to an Elegy. The accompanying music video was premiered on Vulture.com on October 22, 2015.

== Song description ==
Most music critics noted the song's deviating from the band's traditional guitar sound. In his review of the album, Spin's Andrew Unterberger compared the song to the work of synthpop duo Erasure. Speculating on possible influences, the Rolling Stone's Dan Hallman characterised the song as "Killers-ish". In similar vein, Drowned in Sound's Andrzej Lukowski described the track as a "blippy homage to Corgan’s beloved New Order". In contrast, Consequence of Sound's Michael Roffman likened the track to the band's previous album Oceania.

== Background and recording ==
The song was featured on several preliminary track listings for the album posted on the band's website.

The final version that appears on the album seems to be considerably different from its early demo version. In an update on the recording process posted on the band's website on April 14, 2014, band leader Billy Corgan described the song's sound as being more Big Country than The Smashing Pumpkins, with producer Howard Willing criticising the "80s drums" on the track, triggering a process of "deconstruction". In a later update on 16 May, Corgan described "stripping away previous guitars so that all that was left were [..] drums and [...] bass", then adding an "arpeggiated figure" reminiscent of The Who's "Baba O'Riley" as well as strings reminiscent of the band's own song Tonight, Tonight. On June 18, 2014, Corgan announced the song as being "done" in another recording update on the band's website.

== Music video ==
Directed by longtime Corgan collaborator Linda Strawberry, the music video features "magical orbs, eerie incantations, and mysterious hooded women". Strawberry elaborated on the video's narrative: "The Magician is symbolic of transition and inspiration, while the protagonist in the video is afraid of who she is about to become, she learns, accepts and then lets go of whatever was holding her back."

== Reception ==
General critical reception to the song has been mixed. The Guardian's Kitty Empire noted the song "glides past appealingly" while "[crying] out for a Euro-rave remix". In similar fashion, Drowned in Sound's Andrzej Lukowski described the song as "gorgeous". Consequence of Sound's Michelle Geslani even called the song a "standout" of the album. A number of critics, however, found less praising words in their reviews. NME's Kevin Eg Perry considered the track one of the weaker on the album, calling it an "[unsuccessful] stab[...] at synthpop". Criticizing its "cringe-inducing text-speak title", he likened the song to "a forgotten 1980s Eurovision entry". Stereogum's Michael Nelson called the song "skippable", while Clash's Mike Diver referred to it as "completely tiresome" in his verdict.

== Personnel ==
The Smashing Pumpkins

- Billy Corgan – vocals, guitar, bass, keyboards and synthesizers
- Jeff Schroeder – guitar

Additional musicians

- Tommy Lee – drums
