= Freak (The Smashing Pumpkins song) =

- Promotional CD-R of "Freak"

Single by The Smashing Pumpkins

from the album Teargarden by Kaleidyscope
- Released: 2010
- Recorded: 2009–2010
- Genre: Alternative rock
- Length: 3:51
- Label: Martha's Music / Rocket Science
- Songwriter(s): Billy Corgan

The Smashing Pumpkins singles chronology
"G.L.O.W." (2008)	"Freak" (2010)	"Owata" (2011)

"Freak" (also titled as "Freak U.S.A.") is the second single from The Smashing Pumpkins's 34-track music project, Teargarden by Kaleidyscope, and the first song released for the second accompanying EP The Solstice Bare. Like all other songs on the EP, "Freak" was released as a free download on their official website. The song was first played live on July 24, 2009, at the first Spirits in the Sky show in memoriam of Sky Saxon. It was performed live by the Pumpkins throughout their 2010 tours.

== Critical reception ==
Spin praised the song, noting that "the catchy chorus of bright guitars and cheerful na na na na nas recall his short-lived pop-rock side-project Zwan; the heavy, distorted bass lines revisit the goth-rock moments of Mellon Collie and the Infinite Sadness; and his lyrics are all early-Pumpkins." PopMatters's reviewed that "Freak" "largely explores and builds on The Smashing Pumpkins’ earlier, mid-1990s sound while also very subtly hinting at the newly pointed and cultish, lysergic musical atmosphere."

== Charts ==
Chart (2010)	Peak position
US Alternative Airplay (Billboard)	27
