= Linda Strawberry =

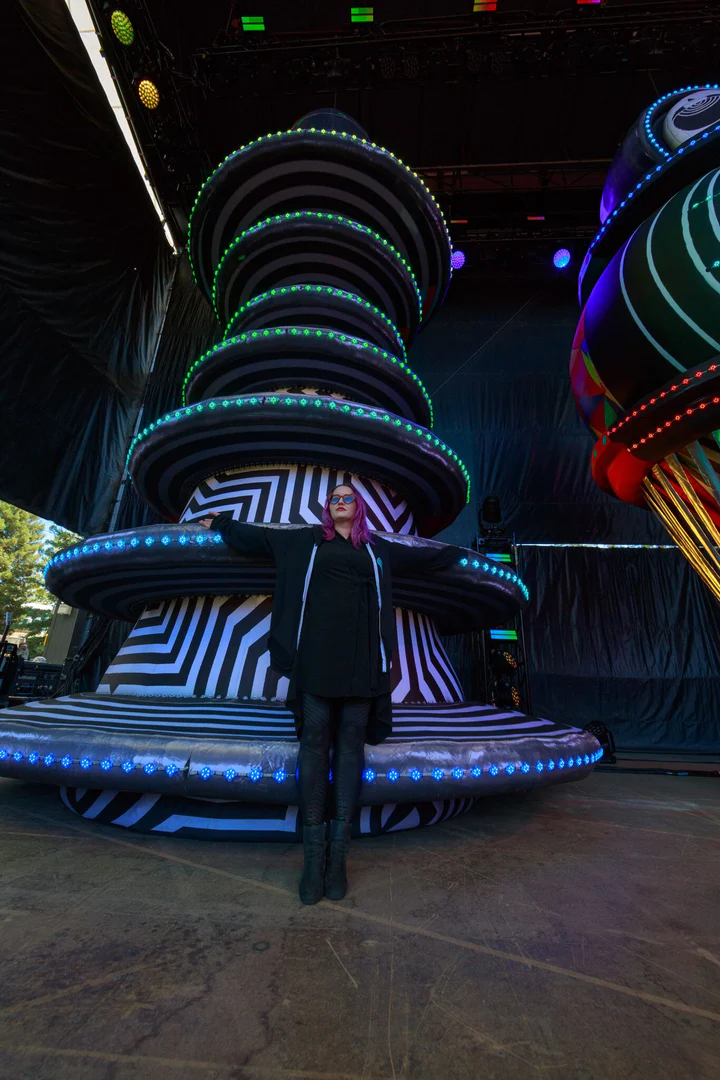

Background information
- Occupations: Director; Production Designer; editor; colorist; musician
- Instruments: Keyboards; vocals; guitar; bass
- Years active: 2000–present
- Website: lindastrawberry.com

Linda Strawberry is an American artist, director, production designer, editor and musician, best known for her work on tours and music videos, as well as her creative collaborations with Billy Corgan.

== Career ==
Initially working under her birth name Linda Rowberry, Strawberry collaborated with Especially For Youth on I Know My Redeemer Lives (2000) and with David Coverdale on Into the Light (2001)

She spent some time working as a recording engineer, most notably working on Sarah Mclachlan's Afterglow (2002) which has since sold over 4 million copies.

In 2001, she performed with Djali Zwan (the second, acoustic incarnation of Corgan's Zwan project), appearing on the soundtrack to the movie Spun; she is the lead singer on the version of "Love to Love" from that soundtrack. Strawberry was signed to Chrysalis Records with a publishing development deal from 2004 to 2006.

She started her own label called Lovely Chaos Records, on which she released The Lost Record EP in August 2007, and Lip Distortion in 2009.

She has appeared on The Jimmy Chamberlin Complex album Life Begins Again, and on the soundtrack of 2002 movie Spun as well acting as an engineer on Sarah McLachlan's latest record. She has worked with Bjorn Thorsrud, Alan Moulder, Bon Harris. She sang a duet with David Coverdale on his 2001 solo record Into the Light. She appeared with Billy Corgan on the last Bozo the Clown Show. She was also active as a production assistant to the Zwan project.

August 2009 Strawberry joined Billy Corgan, Dave Navarro, Mark Tulin, Mike Byrne, Kerry Brown, Mark Weitz, Ysanne Spevack, and Kevin Dippold to do a tour under the band name Spirits in the Sky.

In 2011 she sang a duet with Curt Smith from Tears for Fears for a song by The Shadow Bureau titled "Don't Give Yourself Away", and was responsible for some of the artwork for Peter Murphy's video of "I Spit Roses."

Strawberry co-wrote and produced a song "Dancing in the Sunshine" for Disney television show Phineas and Ferb for the episode "Just My Luck".

In 2012 she began working as a producer, video director, editor, and colorist. Some of her work includes Kat Von D's "I Am Nothing" as director, production designer, editor, colorist; Peter Murphy's "I Spit Roses" illustrator; Smashing Pumpkins's "Cyr" director/editor; and as AFI's "Tied To A Tree" director/editor.

In 2017 she co-directed and edited a 41-minute psychedelic silent art film titled Pillbox accompanying Billy Corgan's record Ogilala. Later that year she also directed a live solo performance of Corgan playing songs from Ogilala and Smashing Pumpkins that was released under the title Neath the Darkest Eves.

The year 2018 marked a significant shift in Strawberry's creative focus as she assumed the role of creative director and content producer for The Smashing Pumpkins' Shiny and Oh So Bright Tour. In this capacity, she oversaw all content creation and directed all filmed content for over 30 songs, leading ambitious animation and art projects.

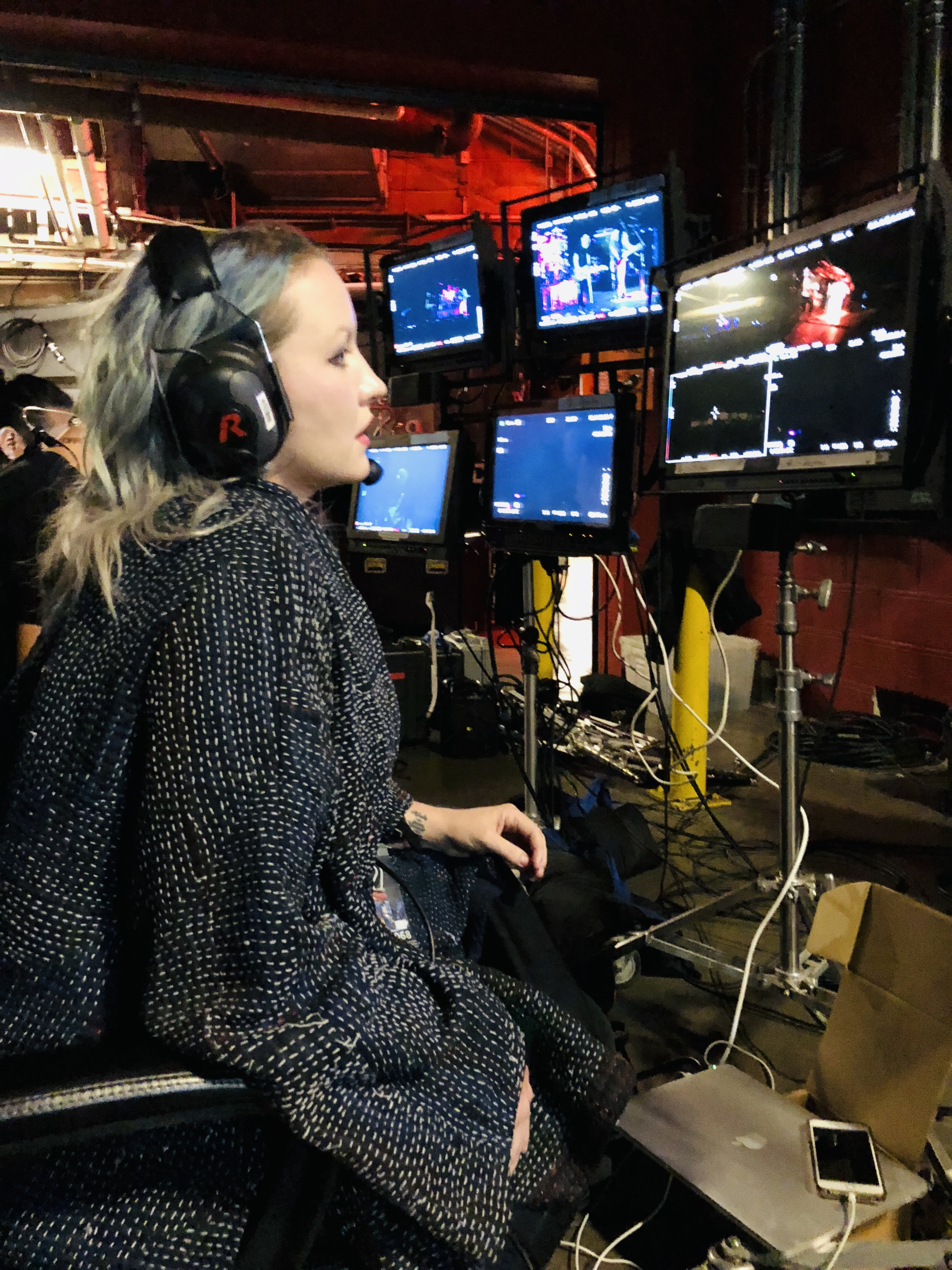
Linda Strawberry out on tour with The Smashing Pumpkins during the Shiny and Oh So Bright Tour 2018

== Live Concert Work ==
2018: Co-Executive Producer, Creative Director: Smashing Pumpkins, Shiny And Oh So Bright Tour, and the 30th Anniversary Series Mini-Tour.

2018: Visual Content, Creative Direction: Shiny and Oh So Bright Fall Tour - Smashing Pumpkins

2019: Creative Director/Designer: Smashing Pumpkins European and North American tours, featuring 31 foot tall Bauhaus Movement inspired puppets.

2019: Co-Creative Direction, Visual Content: Bon Jovi, This House is Not For Sale European Tour.

2021: Visual Content: Green Day song "She" for the Hella Mega Tour

2021: Production Design, Visual Content: Kat Von D, Love Made Me Do It Tour.

2022: Visual Content Deftones Tour

2022: Visual Content Cardi B, Wireless Festival

2022: Director of Filmed Content Lizzo, "Special" Tour

2022: Visual Content, Creative Producer for Maxwell

2022: Creative Direction, Visual Content, Creative Producer - Spirits on Fire Tour Smashing Pumpkins

2023: Production Design, Lighting Design, Visual Content Falling in Reverse, The Popular Monstour

2024: Visual Content for No Doubt at Coachella

2024: Visual Content, Filmed Content, Creative Direction for Maxwell

== Solo discography ==
- 2007: The Lost Record
- 2009: Lip Distortion
- 2012: The Saddest Song (single)
- 2020: Dig (single)
- 2024: Black Tar (single)
- 2024: A Pale Rose (single)

== Filmography ==
- "Pillbox" co-directed with Billy Corgan (2017)
- "'Neath the Darkest Eves" a solo performance by Billy Corgan

=== Music videos ===
- 2012: "I Spit Roses" - Peter Murphy - Illustration
- 2015: "Run 2 Me" - Smashing Pumpkins - Production, Editing, Direction, VFX
- 2016: "Gentrification Blues" - David J - Production, Editing, Direction, VFX
- 2017: "The Spaniards" - William Patrick Corgan - Production, Editing, Direction, VFX
- 2018: "Better, Faster, Stronger" - Willa Amai - Editing, Color, VFX
- 2019: "Time on My Hands" - Katie Cole - Director, Editor, DP
- 2018: "Silvery Sometimes" - Smashing Pumpkins - Production, Editing, Creative Direction
- 2020: "CYR" - Smashing Pumpkins - Production, Editing, Direction, VFX
- 2020: "Ramona" - Smashing Pumpkins - Production, Editing, Direction, VFX
- 2021: "What's Coming To Me" - Dorothy - Production, Editing, Direction, VFX
- 2021: "Tied To A Tree" - AFI - Production, Editing, Direction, VFX
- 2021: "I Am Nothing" - Kat Von D - Production, Production Design, Editing, Direction, VFX
- 2021: "Enough" - Kat Von D - Editing, Color, VFX
- 2022: "Beguiled" - Smashing Pumpkins - Director, Production Design, Styling
- 2022: "Peach" - Sierra Swan (featuring Billy Corgan) - Director, Editor, DP
- 2022: "Rest In Peace" - Dorothy - Editing, Color Grading
- 2022: "Off" - Maxwell - performance on Good Morning America - Producer, Director, Editor
- 2022: "Black Sheep" - Dorothy - Editing, Color Grading
- 2024: “If These Walls Could Talk” - Scott Stapp featuring Dorothy - Editing, Color Grading
- 2024: "Mud" - Dorothy - Editor, Color Grading, VFX
- 2024: "Bulldozer" - Girli - Editor, Color Grading, VFX
