= Drum + Fife =

2014 single by The Smashing Pumpkins

Single by The Smashing Pumpkins

from the album Monuments to an Elegy
- Released: November 21, 2014
- Recorded: 2014
- Genre: Rock
- Length: 3:54
- Label: BMG/Martha's Music
- Songwriter: Billy Corgan
- Producers: Billy Corgan; Jeff Schroeder; Howard Willing

The Smashing Pumpkins singles chronology
"One and All (We Are)" (2014)	"Drum + Fife" (2014)	"Run2me" (2015)

"Drum + Fife" is the third single from The Smashing Pumpkins' ninth studio album Monuments to an Elegy. The track was premiered through NME on November 21, 2014.

== Background and recording ==
In an interview with the NME, Billy Corgan said "'Drum + Fife' was originally a folk song. We really had a problem getting it off its almost dour Irish balladeer aspect. And I must give a lot of credit to Tommy Lee, because he's the one who turned the corner. Without saying it he was reacting in a way that told me he thought it was a bit boring. Tommy loves energy. Tommy wants to feel excitement. So he's playing the song and he's like 'I know this is a good song but it's just not working.' And he said to me 'Do you mind if I tinker around with it?' And so he got on the computer and used his experience in dance music and kind of turned the corner and found some loops and some beats and suddenly I was like...'wow'. It's almost like mid 80s new wave or something and it reminded me a little bit of early U2 or Big Country. The open strut made the Irish ballad part of the song come alive and have more of a expansive quality and from there on it got a lot easier."

Despite doing significant restructuring on the song, Tommy Lee was not given a co-writer's credit.

== Reception ==
The song was received positively. Stereogum compared it to the previous songs released from Monuments, saying it was "not on the level of 'Tiberius', but at least as good as 'One and All'." Consequence of Sound described it as "a melodic, yet rallying rocker", and went on to describe Corgan's vocals as "tenacious". Radio.com stated "Our latest taste is track 'Drum + Fife', a mid-tempo, melodic rock song, structured and accessible like all their best work. Essentially, the Smashing Pumpkins are not still in their experimental period. They are back to crowd-pleasing—and many are, appropriately, pleased."

== Personnel ==
The Smashing Pumpkins

- Billy Corgan – vocals, guitar, bass, keyboards and synthesizers
- Jeff Schroeder – guitar

Additional musicians

- Tommy Lee – drums
