= One and All (song) =

"One and All (We Are)"

Single by The Smashing Pumpkins

from the album Monuments to an Elegy
- Released: November 5, 2014
- Recorded: 2014
- Genre: Alternative rock
- Length: 3:46
- Label: BMG/Martha's Music
- Songwriter(s): Billy Corgan
- Producer(s): Billy Corgan; Jeff Schroeder; Howard Willing

The Smashing Pumpkins singles chronology
"Being Beige" (2014)	"One and All (We Are)" (2014)	"Drum + Fife" (2014)

"One and All (We Are)" is the second single from The Smashing Pumpkins' tenth album Monuments to an Elegy. The track premiered through Huffington Post on November 5, 2014.

== Recording and sound ==
In an interview with the Huffington Post, band leader Billy Corgan said "I basically sang the whole song the first time I wrote it... It had written itself." Rolling Stone described the track as having "a deep wash of grungy guitar distortion ...the hard-rocking "One and All" features the drumming of Mötley Crüe's Tommy Lee bashing his way through Billy Corgan and Jeff Schroeder's murky mires of guitar and the singer's lyrics about feeling young."

== Reception ==
The song was favorably received. Stereogum said "The brand new, guitar-overloaded “One and All" is a considerable improvement on "Being Beige," in my opinion – it's considerably heavier, too, which plays to Billy Corgan's strengths at this point in his career." Music Times stated that "Fans of the Pumpkins will not be disappointed, as the song has a darkly metallic quality reminiscent of their 1995 opus Mellon Collie and the Infinite Sadness."Spin.com stated "The new track isn't quite a return to the Pumpkins' glory days, but "One and All" does boast a shoegaze-set-on-overdrive sheen."

== Personnel ==
The Smashing Pumpkins

- Billy Corgan – vocals, guitar, bass, keyboards and synthesizers
- Jeff Schroeder – guitar

Additional musicians

- Tommy Lee – drums

== Charts ==
Chart (2014)	Peak position
US Rock Airplay (Billboard)	47
