= Ysanne Spevack =

British composer, conductor and arranger (born 1972)

Meena Ysanne
- Born: Ysanne Spevack; 24 June 1972 (age 54); London, England
- Other names: Meena Ysanne, Mee
- Education: The Latymer School; Royal College of Music
- Occupations: Composer, conductor, arranger, violinist, author
- Years active: 1988-present
- Known for: Music, writing, sensory experiences
- Website: ilovestrings.com tastecolors.com

Ysanne Spevack (born 24 June 1972) is a British and American composer, conductor and arranger who plays violin, viola and cello, and assorted multi-instruments including mbira, keyboards and guitar. best known for her work recording and touring with the Smashing Pumpkins, David J, Michael Stipe, Tiesto, Elton John, Christina Perri, Hawkwind, Psychic TV, and Asian Dub Foundation. Since 2016, she has been known as Meena Ysanne.

She has a dual career as a food writer. Her thirteen cookbooks have been published by HarperCollins and other book publishers internationally, and have led to her writing about food for the Los Angeles Times and other leading media outlets internationally.

She was based in Los Angeles from 2004-2015, where she shaped a career arranging strings and playing acoustic and electric violin, and composing original music for soundtracks, notably for two feature films: To Be Friends and The Owls. Her performance and arranging work for film, TV and multiple recording artists touches upon several genres, including orchestral, rock music, pop music, world music, and film scores.

In 2014, she started designing multisensory, multimedia immersive experiences in New York based on her music compositions, food concepts, and emerging ideas from neuroscience and psychology. She did this leading a team of artists and scientists from many disciplines for each event. In May 2017, she presented a TEDx Talk about this work in Bend, Oregon.

She is based between New York, London, Austin TX, and Los Angeles.

== Biography ==
=== Early life ===
Ysanne was raised in London, where she studied piano, violin and guitar. She began touring Europe aged 13, playing classical chamber music repertoire including Mozart, Vivaldi and Haydn under the direction of Susan Collier, who is the mother of Jacob Collier. Her great uncle, Edward Summers, was a professional violinist who played for silent movies, and her cousin is classical violinist Geoffrey Trabichoff.

After studying composition and conducting with violin at The Royal College of Music, London, and then later CuBase and Music Technology at Community Music, with teachers Aniruddha Das and Steve Chandra Savale, she traveled to India, studying classical Indian music and sitar in the city of Varanasi before joining their band, Asian Dub Foundation, as a guest violinist for their first album, Rafi's Revenge. In 1995, Ysanne began to play electric violin with electronics for many producers and DJs in the underground Acid House, Techno and Drum and Bass music scenes of London, notably with Sister Bliss from Faithless, Tiesto, Talvin Singh, T Power and Tsuyoshi Suzuki.

=== Rock, Pop and Soundtrack Composing Career ===
Ysanne began her recording career in 1996 by recording and releasing her first studio album, under the moniker Mee. Even in this first work, she relies heavily on Extended technique while playing an acoustic violin made from aluminum alloy. In 1997 she began collaborating with Philip Clemo and released the album Sound – Inhale the Colours with him. Later that year on 25 June, she played electric violin with Laurie Anderson at the Queen Elizabeth Hall as part of the South Bank Meltdown Festival.

In 1999 she recorded another album with Philip Clemo, Soundzero, which was not released until 2008. The same year she participated to various neofolk compilations, notably The Pact ...Of the Gods (Fremdheit), Torture Garden – Bizarre & Eccentric (Torture Garden Records), and the split single with Death in June We Said Destroy as part of the band Fire + Ice. She also produced the music on the album Time Dragons, a spoken word album.

In 2001, she composed soundtracks for the Discovery Channel's Lonely Planet travel series. In 2003, Ysanne was invited to perform electric violin for Peter Sellars at the Venice Biennale. This led her to being invited to arrange strings and record electric violin for a new work for the English National Opera. She moved to America the year after.

In 2008, she played violin, viola and electric violin for visual artist Doug Aitken's work sleepwalkers. The film featured Tilda Swinton, Donald Sutherland and Cat Power, and premiered at MoMA in New York.

In 2009, Ysanne recorded the track Salahadeen with the Master Musicians of Joujouka, David J and Dub Gabriel. The same year she was also the string contractor for Ray Bradbury's 'Chrysalis' and toured with David J.

In 2010 she directed the music and sang live at the Frankfurt Museum of Modern Art for visual performance artist Vanessa Beecroft's work VB68. It was the 68th work where Beecroft arranged women as art, but the 1st work where any women have made a noise. The performance lasted for two hours, with Ysanne singing and vocalising Beecroft's manifesto. The same year she composed the soundtracks to two full-length feature films: To Be Friends for brothers Jim and Aaron Eckhart, and The Owls for Cheryl Dunye and her strings were commissioned for HBO's Big Love. She also played strings on the Smashing Pumpkins Teargarden by Kaleidyscope EP series that featured Billy Corgan, Kerry Brown and Linda Strawberry.

In September 2011, Ysanne joined David J and Ego Plum to play music for the Los Angeles stage production of The Chanteuse and the Devil's Muse, and in November 2011, she joined David for the Los Angeles stage production of Silver for Gold and the Redcat Theater. David J played bass guitar on her new album, Coldwater, which was released in 2013.

In 2013, Ysanne's song and film, The Mermaid Song, sold 24,000 copies, released in collaboration with Sea Shepherd Conservation Society and LUSH (company), as featured in the Los Angeles Times and internationally.

In 2016, Ysanne created a multisensory performance with music, food, technology, video and other modalities, as featured in The Huffington Post and widely reported internationally. She was interviewed about this for Future Human from Nokia Bell Labs

In 2017, she presented a TED Talk about creating multi-sensory, multidisciplinary work that is Crossmodal. She also wrote orchestral arrangements and recordings that were released on the Psychic TV album, Fishscales Falling.

She primarily composes soundtracks for film, commercials, and documentaries, including her original music for ads for Vans, Chanel, and Mars.

=== Food Writing Career ===
In addition to her music career, Ysanne has a dual career as a cookbook author, and as a writer about food, culture, and lifestyle for magazines. Her first cookbook, Organic Cookbook, was published in 1996. She has had thirteen cookbooks published including Fresh & Wild - A Real Food Adventure which was commissioned by Whole Foods Market and published by HarperCollins in 2003. In 2015, Rizzoli Bookstore published a cookbook she co-wrote The Ranch at Live Oak Cookbook and the book was praised by The New York Times and Vogue, Harper's Bazaar alongside other international mainstream media.

In September 2018, her cookbook Vegetable Cakes was published by Lorenz Books.

In addition, she has managed edible estates for William Shatner, Patrick Dempsey and Angela Lindvall and cooked for members of the entertainment and wellness community, including Joshua Bell and Sharon Salzberg.

=== Sensory Experience Design Career ===
Since 2014, Ysanne has combined her knowledge of music and food by creating immersive experiences based on emerging crossmodal scientific understanding of how the sense perceptions are inter-related and integrated.

In September 2016, Ysanne's multisensory experiences were praised in Yahoo! News, Huffington Post, The Express Tribune, and Cool Hunting.

== Incomplete Discography ==
Ysanne has produced music under her birth name, and under the aliases Meena Ysanne, Mee, and Soror U.

- Mee, 1997', credited to Mee (Mee Music)
- Sound – Inhale the colours, 1997, credited to Mee and Philip Clemo (Mee Music)
- Time Dragons: Poems, Pathworkings and Pataphysical Patter, 1999, from the box set The Chaos Magick Audio CDs Volume 5 – The Galafron Rite & Timedragons, An Astral Working of Illumination, credited to Dave Lee, Soror U and Dr. Natan Satan and edited by Peter J. Carroll (Falcon Press)
- The Sound of Fashion, 2004, credited to Ysanne Spevack and Carl Ryden (Standard Music)
- Soundzero, 2008, credited to Ysanne Spevack and Philip Clemo (Koch / Cadiz)
- The Mermaid Song, 2013, credited to Ysanne (LUSH Cosmetics / Sea Shepherd Conservation Society)

== Incomplete bibliography ==
- Spevack, Ysanne (2018). Vegetable Cakes. Anness Publishing ISBN 978-0754833246.
- Spevack, Ysanne (2015). Grow Organic, Cook Organic: Natural Food From Garden To Table. ISBN 978-1844776276.
- Spevack, Ysanne (2015). The No-Sugar Desserts and Baking Cookbook. Anness Publishing. ISBN 978-0-754-8308-01.
- Spevack, Ysanne (2003). Farmer's Market Cookbook. ISBN 978-1843098256.
- Spevack, Ysanne (2003). Fresh & Wild - A Real Food Adventure. HarperCollins. ISBN 9-780-007332-557.
- Spevack, Ysanne & Jan Bellame + John Bellame (2003). Clearspring - A Real Taste of Japan, Using The Finest Ingredients. Clearspring. ISBN 9-781-89770-1973.
- Spevack, Ysanne (1996). Organic Cookbook. Lorenz Books. ISBN 9-780-754818-649.
