= Being Beige =

Single by The Smashing Pumpkins

from the album Monuments to an Elegy
- Released: October 20, 2014
- Recorded: 2014
- Genre: Pop rock
- Length: 3:39
- Label: BMG/Martha's Music
- Songwriter(s): Billy Corgan
- Producer(s): Billy Corgan; Jeff Schroeder; Howard Willing

The Smashing Pumpkins singles chronology
"Panopticon" (2012)	"Being Beige" (2014)	"One and All (We Are)" (2014)

"Being Beige" is the first single from The Smashing Pumpkins' tenth album Monuments to an Elegy. The track was released through SoundCloud on October 20, 2014.

== Background and recording ==
The song was first mentioned on the Smashing Pumpkins' website under the working title "World's On Fire," and later under the title "Being Beige (World's On Fire)."

Speaking of the song with Rolling Stone, band leader Billy Corgan said "People always ask me to explain songs, and honestly I can't. But if there's honesty in this lyric, it's that there's something amiss in our cosmos. Yet still, we must love."

== Music video ==
As early as November, Billy Corgan alluded to a new Smashing Pumpkins music video, posting several pictures from a shoot on the Smashing Pumpkins' Instagram account. On January 16, the Smashing Pumpkins announced via Twitter that the music video was made for "Being Beige" and that it would premiere on January 19.

Directed by Brian and Brad Palmer the video magnifies the surreal, dreamlike space of lost love experienced through the moment of an embrace, as twin bodies merge into one. It explores transcendence of oneself – into a new, limitless body of existence.

== Reception ==
The song has received fairly positive feedback. Rolling Stone said that though the song "has a simple title... its acoustic guitar and drum machine intro builds toward an urgent, memorable chorus."

Chicago Reader said "Corgan seems remarkably placid on this new cut. It sounds like Monuments... won't be a retread of the Pumpkins' "rat in a cage" days. Corgan's putting his rage behind him in favor of a slow, piano-accented build toward the heights of songs like "Perfect" or the more energetic selections from his early-aughts stint with Zwan."

The 405 said "the track features some pretty acoustic guitar arpeggios over mist-like drum machine sounds in its quieter moments, livening up to a crashing wave kineticism with sweeps of distorted guitar and aching melodies, as the vocals paint a stumbling melody over these sounds, layering towards the end in a maintained crescendo."

== Personnel ==
The Smashing Pumpkins

- Billy Corgan – vocals, guitar, bass, keyboards and synthesizers
- Jeff Schroeder – guitar

Additional musicians

- Tommy Lee – drums
