= FOL (song) =

Song by The Smashing Pumpkins
- Released: February 1, 2009
- Genre: Alternative rock
- Length: 3:04
- Songwriter(s): Billy Corgan

"FOL" is a song by The Smashing Pumpkins, written and recorded during the sessions for their 2007 album Zeitgeist and used for a Hyundai commercial during Super Bowl XLIII. The song title is an acronym that stands for "Feel Our Love".

The song was first announced by Hyundai for their Genesis Coupe Super Bowl commercial, debuting on February 1, in which Billy Corgan mixed Hyundai clips going to the beat of the song. On that same day, the song was released as a free download from the Hyundai website.

It was the theme song for TNA Wrestling's premiere event of the year, Bound for Glory 2010.
