= Kerry Brown (musician) =

American musician and producer (born 1963)

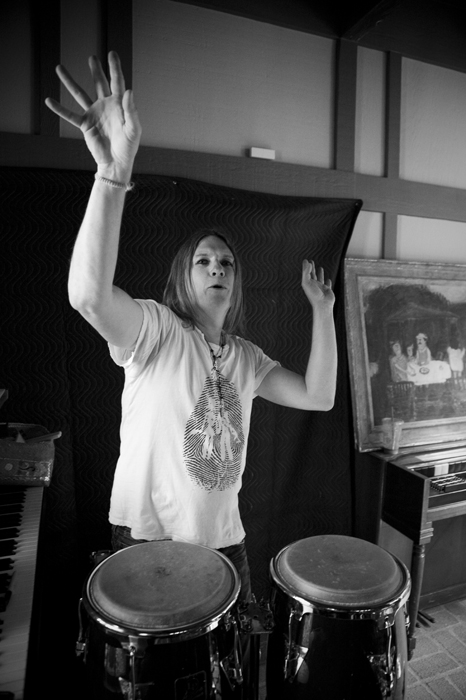
- Brown in April 2012

Background information
- Birth name: Kerry Paul Brown
- Also known as: @studiodog
- Born: 5 December 1963 (age 61); Pasadena, California, United States
- Genres: Alternative rock, heavy metal
- Instrument(s): Drums, percussion, vocals, piano, keyboards, bass guitar
- Years active: 1982-present
- Labels: TVT, Starry Records
- Spouse: Stacey Sher (m. 2001)
- Website: starryrecords.net

Kerry Paul Brown (born 1963) is a record producer, movie soundtrack producer, music editor, composer, artist manager, and a musician. He was the drummer in Chicago alternative rock band Catherine in the 1990s. He also played drums for the Smashing Pumpkins on the song "Blew Away" and produced "Starla" and "Plume" for the album Pisces Iscariot during his marriage to Smashing Pumpkins bass player, D'arcy Wretzky.

== Career ==
=== As musician ===
Kerry wrote for, played drums for, recorded, and produced, his band Catherine from 1985 to 1998. They officially released one 7" single, an E.P., and two albums between 1991 and 1996. Catherine performed a one-off two song reunion set at a Smashing Pumpkins concert at the Riveria Theatre in Chicago, IL on 14 October 2011, featuring Billy Corgan on guitar. He also performed drums on The Smashing Pumpkins track "Blew Away" amongst his many various producer/engineer stints for the band. He played hand drums in Spirits in the Sky, a short lived live band that featured Corgan, Dave Navarro, Mark Tulin, Ysanne Spevack, and Mike Byrne. Kerry was the drummer in a one-off group called The Backwards Clock Society, which featured Tulin on bass and Billy Corgan on vocals and guitar. The one and only Backwards Clock Society show was held on 8 November 2009, at the Echoplex in Los Angeles, CA. The show was a benefit for former drummer Laura Ann Masura who suffered serious motorcycle-related injuries. Future bass player of The Smashing Pumpkins Nicole Fiorentino was performing with Light FM at this show, and was pointed out to Corgan by Kerry at this show.

=== As producer ===
Kerry Brown has produced the music soundtracks to major Hollywood motion pictures including Blow and P.S. I Love You. He is a supporter of many music-related productions, including the music documentary Hit So Hard about Patty Schemel of the band Hole, and David J of Bauhaus/Love and Rockets 2011 album, 'Not Long For This World'.

The Smashing Pumpkins' 2007 album Zeitgeist was recorded in his home studio. At least 300 Smashing Pumpkins songs have been recorded in Brown's home studio during the 2000s in demo format, including original versions of many songs that later appeared on the eighth Smashing Pumpkins album, Teargarden by Kaleidyscope.

In 2009, he joined Smashing Pumpkins frontman Billy Corgan, Jane's Addiction guitarist Dave Navarro, and several others in the band Spirits in the Sky. In September 2009, he went with Corgan to Chicago to begin work producing the Smashing Pumpkins album, Teargarden by Kaleidyscope.

Brown has produced records for Los Angeles' legendary underground artists and bands, including Sky Saxon, Twilight Singers, Greg Dulli, Fancy Space People, The Woolly Bandits, Evil Beaver, Damien Youth and Ysanne Spevack. He continues to compose and record tracks for release of his own music, in which he sings and plays all the instruments.

=== Startone Records ===
In January 2010, Brown announced that he is starting a record label with Corgan. This record label was to be called Startone Records and the roster includes The Electric Prunes, The Strawberry Alarm Clock, YaHoWha 13, Starchildren and Fancy Space People. However, the status of their collaboration for the label is unclear as it was announced that Brown and Corgan will no longer be working together as of December 2011. Brown continues to run Starry Records, having released the debut Fancy Space People 12" EP, and in the fall of 2011, released Not Long For This World, by Bauhaus legend David J.

=== We Are Hear ===
In 2017, Brown partnered with Linda Perry to launch We Are Hear, a record label, music publisher, and artist management company based in Los Angeles. Under their leadership, the company has signed artists including Natasha Bedingfield, Imogen Heap, Dorothy, and Willa Amai among others, and collaborated with artist Kii Arens. Brown has also co-curated events with We Are Hear such as One Love Malibu festival in 2018, which raised $1 million in relief funds for damage caused by the Woolsey Fire, and The Art of Elysium fundraiser Heaven Is Rock & Roll in 2020, featuring the surviving members of Nirvana (Dave Grohl, Pat Smear, and Krist Novoselic) performing alongside Beck and St. Vincent, in addition to performances from Cheap Trick, L7, and Marilyn Manson.

== Discography ==
- The Sidney Poitier Honorary Oscar Tribute for the Academy Awards (mixer)
- P.S. I Love You (song producer, mixer, performer)
- Along Came Polly (music editor)
- How High (song producer, mixer, performer, supervising music editor, sound designer, and temp mixer)
- Blow (songwriter, producer, mixer, performer)
- Scream (songwriter, producer, performer)
- Walking and Talking (songwriter, producer, performer)
- If All Goes Wrong (Sound Mixing)
- Miley Cyrus
- Ziggy Marley
- Jessica Simpson
- The Smashing Pumpkins
- Courtney Love
- Kathy Valentine (The Go-Gos )
- Charlotte Caffey (The Go-Gos )
- Susanna Hoffs (The Bangles)
- Vicki Peterson (The Bangles)
- Ysanne Spevack
- Greg Dulli
- James Iha
- Mark Lanegan
- Sebastian Bach
- Kelley Deal
- Nina Gordon
- Cheap Trick
- Catherine
- Sky Saxon
- Clem Burke
- Chris Slade

== Accolades ==
- C.A.S. Award for Outstanding Achievement in Sound Mixing for If All Goes Wrong
