= Mike Byrne (drummer) =

American drummer

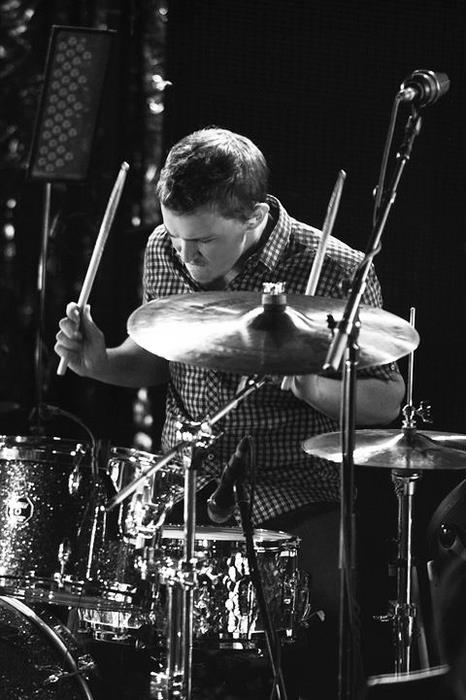
- Byrne drumming for The Smashing Pumpkins in 2011

Background information
- Born: Michael William Byrne; February 6, 1990 (age 36); Portland, Oregon, U.S.
- Genres: Alternative rock, math rock
- Occupation: Musician
- Instrument: Drums
- Years active: 2009–present

Michael William Byrne (born February 6, 1990) is an American drummer who was a member of the rock band The Smashing Pumpkins. When Pumpkins frontman Billy Corgan called for rehearsals to replace Jimmy Chamberlin, Byrne auditioned and was chosen out of thousands of applicants. He played drums in Sky Saxon tribute band Spirits in the Sky for six shows in August 2009, along with Corgan, Kerry Brown, Kevin Dippold, Mark Tulin, Linda Strawberry, Ysanne Spevack, Mark Weitz, and Dave Navarro, and also performs drums on the Pumpkins project, Teargarden by Kaleidyscope. As a part of Teargarden, Byrne contributed drumming duties on Oceania, the Pumpkins' eighth full-length album. On April 17, 2010, Byrne played his first show under the Smashing Pumpkins moniker in celebration of Record Store Day.

On June 13, 2014, Billy Corgan reported that Byrne had left the band.

== Early life ==
Byrne grew up in the Portland suburb of Beaverton, Oregon with his parents Eric and Chris Byrne and his sister, Elise Byrne. He started playing the drums regularly at age 12 and later played in local bands the Mercury Tree, Bearcubbin'! and Moses, Smell the Roses. While attending Beaverton High School, from which he graduated in 2008, he worked at McDonald's to save money for college.

== The Smashing Pumpkins ==
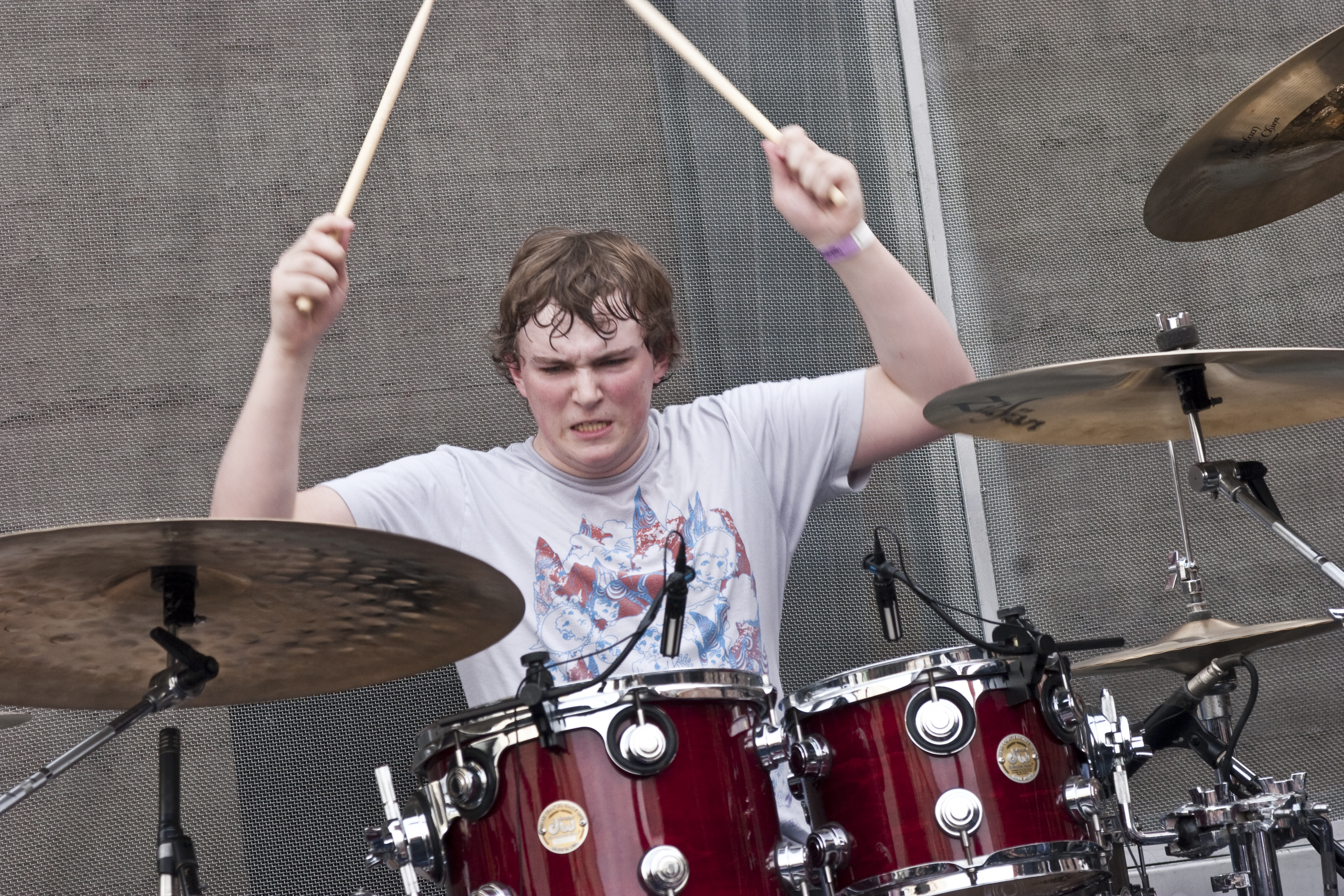
Byrne drumming with the Smashing Pumpkins in 2010

On August 17, 2009, he was officially named as the new drummer for the Smashing Pumpkins. The Pumpkins were already one of his favorite bands, with Jimmy Chamberlin among his most influential drummers. Byrne's YouTube channel, which he created three years prior to joining the band, had been "MarquisinSpadez", a reference to the song "Marquis in Spades", from the Smashing Pumpkins' Zero EP.

In 2011, Byrne won best "Up and Coming" drummer in Modern Drummer's Reader's Poll.

In June 2014, Billy Corgan reported that Byrne had left the band.

== After the Smashing Pumpkins ==
Upon leaving the Smashing Pumpkins, Byrne continued his efforts with his local band Bearcubbin!, in the Pacific Northwest. They have released two full-length albums. During their visit to SXSW in 2014, they won the award for "Worst Band Name" out of the thousands of bands attending.

== Musical influences ==
Byrne cites some of his influences as The Cure, Maserati, Maps and Atlases, and Pelican. He enjoys post-rock and math rock.

== Discography ==
With the Smashing Pumpkins

- Teargarden by Kaleidyscope EPs and stand-alone songs (2009–2011)
- Oceania (2012)

With Bearcubbin'!

- Live from the Bear Trap (2009)
- Jewels & The Wallwalkers/ Bearcubbin'! (2010, split album)
- Get Your Heavies Out (2011)
- Girls with Fun Haircuts (2014)

With Moses, Smell the Roses

- Frenemies EP (2007)
- Please Do Over (2009)
