= High Frontier =

High Frontier may refer to:

- The High Frontier, a 1976 book about space colonization by Gerard K. O'Neill
- High Frontier, Inc., an American think tank established in the 1980s by former Lieutenant General Daniel O. Graham
- High Frontier (video game), a 1987 video game by ZX Spectrum games
- High Frontier (board game), a 2010 board wargame by Sierra Madre
- High Frontier (simulation game) a space colony simulation game by Joe Strout
- The High Frontier (album), 2013 album by American band Lumerians
- The Moon, a natural satellite of Earth

== See also ==
- High Frontiers, former name of Mondo 2000, American magazine
