= Careful =

Careful may refer to:

== Film ==
- Careful (1992 film), 1992 Canadian drama film
- Careful (2017 film), 2017 Malayalam thriller film

== Music ==
=== Albums ===
- Careful (The Motels album), 1980
- Careful (Boy Harsher album), 2019

=== Songs ===
- "Careful" (Guster song), 2003 song by Guster
- "Careful" (Paramore song), 2009 song by Paramore
- "Careful", a song by !!! from Thr!!!er, 2013

== Other uses ==
- Careful, a tower-building game by Ideal Toy Company, released in 1967

== See also ==
- Conscientious
