= Needle spiking =

Act of secretly injecting people with sedative drugs

Needle spiking (also called injection spiking) is the surreptitious injection of drugs into someone. A needle spiking moral panic emerged in 2021 following reports, initially in the United Kingdom and Ireland, of people having been spiked in this way, with medical sociologist Robert Bartholomew characterizing the phenomenon as a social panic; social scientist Marko Ković, who researches conspiracy theories, suggesting it was a psychogenic mass distress in which those effected believe they've been attacked but haven't; and folklorist Veronique Campion-Vincent characterizing it as a "flap" (defined by Michael Goss as "an unusual, dramatic burst of excitement centered upon some anomalous and possibly threatening report that generates others of the same variety"). In the United Kingdom, a Home Affairs Committee report noted a lack of motive in respect of needle spiking and, for 692 incidents recorded in the last three months of 2021, the National Police Chiefs' Council (NPCC) reported "only one offender was identified and one only one secondary offence was recorded".

It was believed date rape drugs, such as Rohypnol (roofie) or GHB, were being injected. No verified toxicological results have been published showing the presence of known incapacitating agents in alleged victims. In 2022, the NPCC reported a controlled drug was present in 25% of people they'd tested, using a new rapid forensic toxicology screen, following a report of needle spiking, although it wasn't clear how the drugs had been administered or if they were self-administered. The prevalence of genuine cases is unknown and has been controversial, with experts expressing doubts as to how easily such injections could be carried out without it being immediately obvious to the victim and suggesting the reports could be the results of a panic. Dr Emmanuel Puskarczyk, head of the poison control centre at the University and Regional Hospital of Nancy, when noting the absence of objective proof has stated that the administration of a substance would require several seconds meaning the recipient would likely notice at the time.

== Reports ==
=== United Kingdom ===
1,032 reported claims of spiking by injection were recorded from the beginning of September to the end of December 2021. In Nottingham, where 15 reports of needle spiking were made in October, police identified only one case where a victim's injury "could be consistent with a needle". In November that year, there followed reports in Brighton and Eastbourne; and it was reported that two women alleged they had been spiked with needles inside a Yorkshire nightclub. In Northern Ireland, the Police Service began an investigation after a woman believed she was spiked with a needle in Omagh on 6 November 2021.

In December 2021, Nottinghamshire Police had received 146 reports of suspected needle spiking. Nine arrests were made but no suspects were subsequently charged. VICE News were informed by the National Police Chiefs' Council (NPCC) of 274 reported cases across the United Kingdom between September and November 2021. The NPCC said that no cases of injection of drugs had been confirmed, and that there was one confirmed case of "needle-sticking", involving someone being jabbed, but not necessarily injected, with a needle; investigations were continuing to determine whether the needle contained any spiking drugs.

Despite the allegations, there has not been a single prosecution from needle spiking in the United Kingdom. Furthermore, experts from the scientific and academic community have claimed the likelihood of being spiked by injection is extremely low. Prof Adam Winstock, a trained consultant psychiatrist from the Global Drugs Survey, explained that "Needles have to be inserted with a level of care [...] The idea these things can be randomly given through clothes in a club is just not that likely."

=== France ===
Since the summer of 2021, over 100 cases of needle spiking have been reported in French nightclubs. In May 2022, the Ministry of the Interior commented that it had found the majority of those reporting incidents had been injected with something; their spokesman said, "Too often the absence of traces detected cannot be interpreted as the absence of an injection, but as sampling too late." In June 2025, 12 alleged perpetrators were arrested after 145 people were reportedly stabbed with syringes in multiple incidents across France in the Fête de la Musique summer street festivals, though it was unclear how many of these were attempts to inject the victims with incapacitating drugs. According to French news outlets such as Le Monde, in the time leading up to the festival, posts circulating on social media called for attacks against women. Experts said some of the spiking reports likely resulted from panic among attendees in the aftermath of initial reports.

=== Ireland ===
In Ireland, the Garda Síochána carried out multiple needle spiking investigations in October and November 2021. The first known report of claimed needle spiking in Ireland was on 27 October 2021, when a woman claimed she was spiked with a needle in a Dublin nightclub.

=== Belgium ===
There was an incident of needle spiking of football supporters in May 2022 during a match between KV Mechelen and Racing Genk. Fourteen soccer fans from the same section of the stadium felt a prick and subsequently became unwell, although initial toxicological reports found nothing.

Also in May 2022, in the city of Hasselt (Limburg), twenty-four youngsters became unwell at teen festival We R Young after what may have been needle spiking or mass hysteria.

=== Germany ===
In May 2022, Australian musician Zoè Zanias of Linea Aspera claimed she was attacked in a needle-spiking at the Berghain nightclub in Berlin, suffering from respiratory depression and an unwanted "psychedelic" experience as a result.

=== The Netherlands ===
Stories of needle spiking went viral in the Low Countries in the spring of 2022. By summer the ensuing moral panic have eventually faded when media started to be more critical to the reports, and the number of rumors gradually decreased.

=== Spain ===
As of summer 2022, Spanish police had registered 23 cases in Catalonia and 12 in the Basque Country. No traces of drugs were detected and there were no cases of related sexual violence. That August, a man was arrested in Palma de Mallorca for falsely claiming to have been spiked with a needle and robbed in a nightclub. In 2023, Spanish authorities, including the Institute of Legal Medicine, concluded all reports of needle spiking in the Balearic Islands were false, extrapolating this to reports from the rest of Spain.

=== Switzerland ===
On 13 August 2022 the Street Parade, a large open air rave event with hundreds of thousands of participants, took place in Zurich. Several young women reported being stabbed with needles by unknown individuals in the crowd. The Zurich city police investigated 10 possible cases, but the investigations were dropped in nine cases, “in particular because no perpetrators could be identified.” A 23-year-old woman was convicted of obstructing justice and fined because she repeatedly lied to the police, claiming that she had been the victim of such an attack and had been treated in hospital. This was “knowingly and intentionally” untrue.

=== Australia ===
On April 24, 2022, a woman claimed she was spiked at a Melbourne nightclub.

== Reactions ==
Concerns have been raised by campaigners, politicians and student bodies. In October 2021 it was reported that British home secretary Priti Patel had requested police forces investigate the alleged incidents. In December that year, the Home Affairs Select Committee launched a new inquiry into spiking, including needle spiking, and the effectiveness of the police response to it.

In Ireland, Young Fine Gael drafted a bill, which Fine Gael members introduced in Seanad Éireann in July 2023, "to provide for the specific offence of spiking characterised by the administration, injection, or causation of the taking orally of a substance, knowing that the person to whom the substance is administered, injected, or caused to be taken does not consent, or being reckless as to whether the person consents, and where the perpetrator intends to overpower or sedate the person, to engage in a sexual act, cause harm, make a gain or cause a loss, or otherwise commit an offence."

=== Boycotts and tougher checks ===
In response, a number of women from university cities decided to boycott nightclubs for "girls' nights in". Campaigners also called on nightclubs to impose tougher checks on entry; an online petition on the issue was considered by Parliament on 4 November 2021, where it was decided no changes to the law should be made.

== See also ==
- Drink spiking
- Needlestick injury
- Pin prick attack
