= Boy Harsher =

American electronic music band

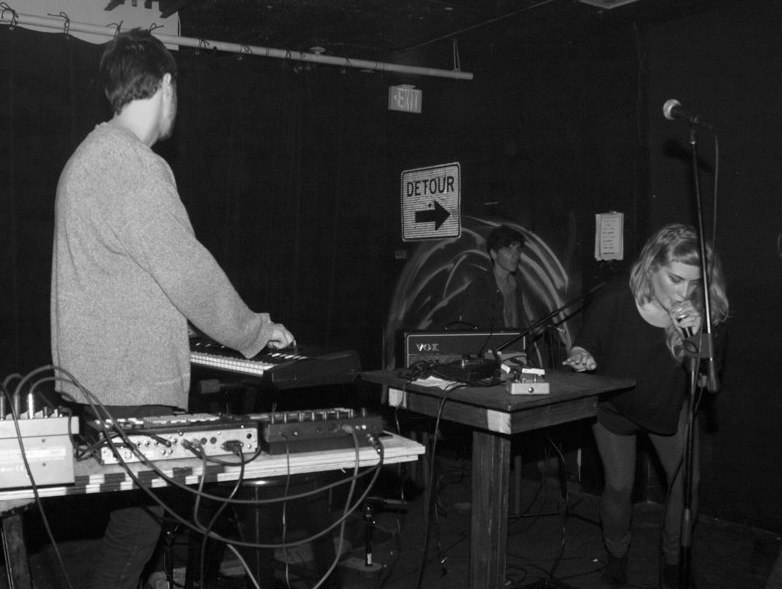
- Boy Harsher in 2014: Augustus Muller (left) and Jae Matthews (right)

Background information
- Also known as: Teen Dreamz (2013–2014)
- Origin: Savannah, Georgia, U.S.
- Genres: Dark wave; electropop; post-industrial
- Years active: 2013–present
- Labels: Atlantic; DKA; Nude Club; Sacred Bones
- Members: Jae Matthews; Augustus Muller
- Website: boyharsher.com

Boy Harsher is an American electronic music group formed in 2013 in Savannah, Georgia. Currently based in Northampton, Massachusetts, the band consists of vocalist Jae Matthews and producer Augustus Muller. The band has amassed a cult following since their formation, and their song "Pain" has become an underground hit. Matthews and Muller own and run the label Nude Club, which is exclusively devoted to Boy Harsher and related artists.

== History ==
Knowing each other from film school in Savannah, Muller and Matthews started the project Teen Dreamz in 2013, which acted as a precursor to Boy Harsher. The project consisted of Matthews performing her spoken word pieces and Muller providing a musical backing. Throughout the year, Teen Dreamz's sound became more danceable, as Matthews's vocals developed into a more expressive singing style. The band renamed their project as Boy Harsher in 2014.

Boy Harsher released its home-recorded debut EP Lesser Man in the same year. Following their relocation to Massachusetts, the band recorded and released its debut album, Yr Body Is Nothing in 2016 on DKA Records. After the release of 2017's Country Girl EP, the band formed their Nude Club imprint in 2018, re-issuing their catalog. One of the first releases on Nude Club, "Pain II", is a reissue of their 2014 single with a remix by The Soft Moon. Their sophomore studio album, 2019's Careful, was backed by an extended reissue of Country Girl EP as Country Girl Uncut. In that year, a remix album of Careful, titled Careful Remixes, etc., was also released; it featured remixes from techno producers such as Marcel Dettmann and Silent Servant.

On April 10, 2020, Muller released his debut soundtrack album, Machine Learning Experiments (Original Soundtrack), which featured original scores composed for two short adult films, Orgone Theory and Hydra. The album was issued on Nude Club. In November 2021, Boy Harsher collaborated with the Eurorack synth designer Ross Fish of Moffenzeef Modular to create "The Runner", a limited-edition Drone synthesizer, to promote their upcoming film. In January 2022, the band's directorial debut film, The Runner, was released with an accompanying soundtrack. The short film starred Kristina Esfandiari and was screened in a select few theaters as well as streamed on Shudder. In October 2022, Boy Harsher collaborated with Danny Elfman on his song "Happy". In November 2023, Boy Harsher collaborated with Moffenzeef Modular once again to release "The Runner 2", an updated version of the previous drone synth.

Following the release of The Runner, Boy Harsher played several high-profile music festivals from 2022 to 2024, including Primavera Sound, Roadburn Festival, Cruel World Festival and Coachella. In late 2024, Muller debuted the Safe Mind side project, a collaboration with Cooper B. Handy, and released the track "6' Pole". Safe Mind's debut album Cutting the Stone came out in July 2025.

In July 2026, Boy Harsher announced their third album Get Mean. Now signed to Atlantic Records, the duo also announced that they had broken up as a romantic couple in early 2024.

== Musical style, imagery and influences ==
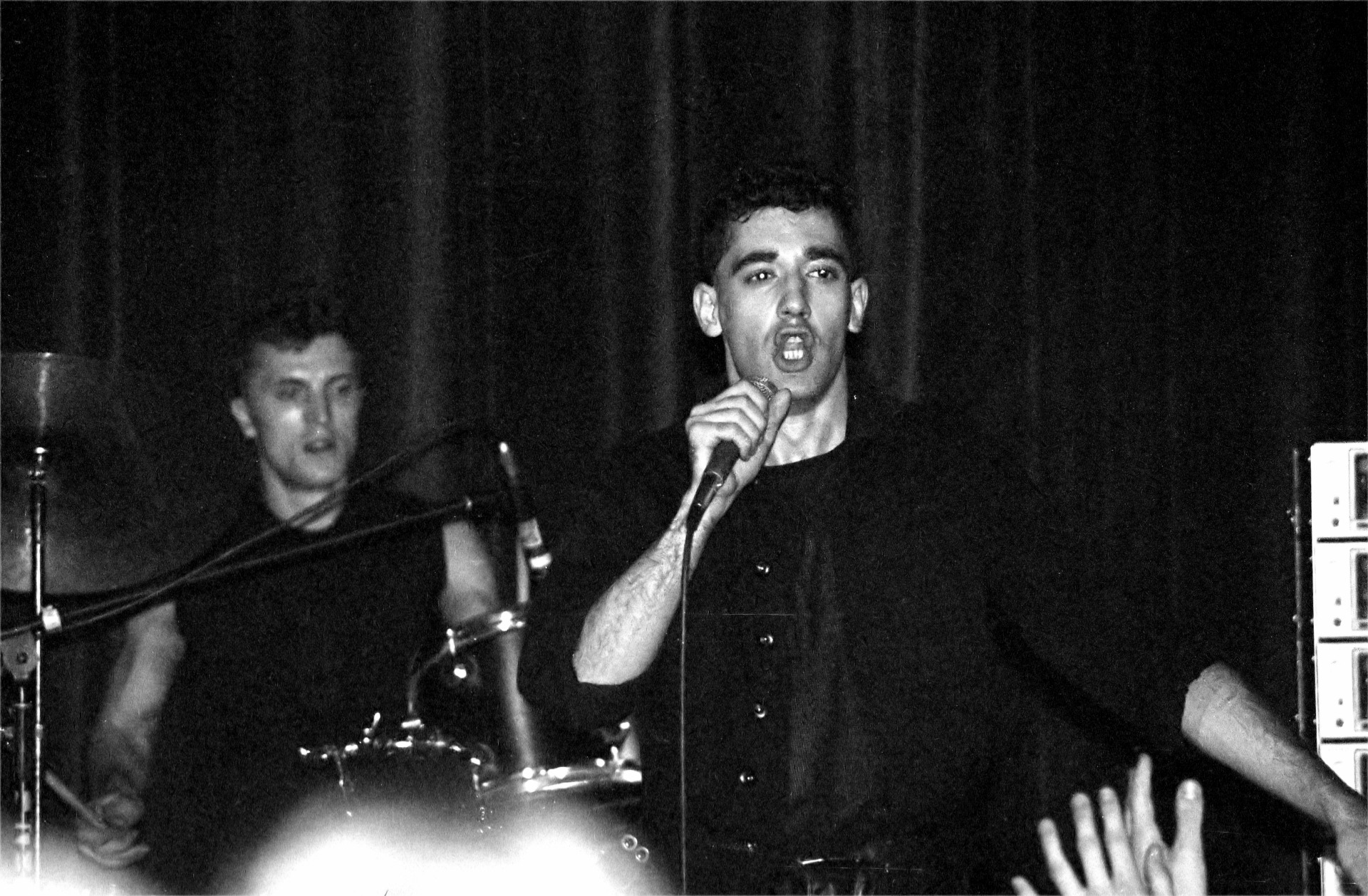
German synthpunk band DAF (pictured in 1981) was reportedly an early influence.

Boy Harsher is often labeled as a dark wave group, with influences ranging from early forms of industrial to electronic body music. Paul Simpson of AllMusic referred to the band's music as "dark, danceable electro pop" that references synth pop and EBM. He has characterized Boy Harsher's music by its minimal beats and synth textures, as well as by Matthews's dynamic vocals that depict "desire, fantasy, and loneliness." On his review for Careful, Kevin Lozano of Pitchfork listed the band as one of the acts that spearhead the minimal synth scene along with Essaie pas, noting the "brisk drum machine loops, oscillating synths, and Matthews’ haunting incantations" that permeate the album's sound. Lozano has previously described the band as "making coldwave that could turn any space in that quiet town into a seedy nightclub." Michael Lawson of The Skinny thought that the band "straddled the middle ground between melancholic cold wave and regimented synth workouts."

Boy Harsher draws heavily from cinema, theatrics and graphic design to tailor the band's visual imagery; Matthews and Muller both have a background in filmmaking. They have likened the band to the movies Body Heat and Lost Highway, the latter of which was directed by David Lynch, a professed influence on the band. Matthews has expressed appreciation for various female vocalists, including Nico, Circuit des Yeux, Alison Lewis of Linea Aspera, Chelsea Wolfe and Zola Jesus, whereas Muller named Sleep Chamber, Suicide, DAF and Yello as early musical influences on Boy Harsher. A press release for Get Mean (2026) noted that its "reference points range from Metric through to OMD".

Gearwise, Muller mostly employs synthesizers and samplers, stating that he "tries and borrows as much [instruments] as he can for recording." On the band's minimal instrumentation, he said: "I'm obsessed with how successful the minimalism is with 80s music. It's really a masterclass of what can be done with a drum machine and a couple of synths." In another interview, he was quoted saying "it was a combination of not having a lot of resources. And we're both not really traditional musicians either. So I was just sort of working with what we had. And it's always been like an aesthetic I was into – minimalism, using small amount of things to convey the most amount." A "half-functioning" Roland Juno-106 was used extensively on the Lesser Man EP; their live set features synth lines sampled into an Akai MPC, as well as backing tracks. In The Runner, Muller can be seen at the 13:55 mark using a Roland D-550 synth and a TC Electronic multi-effects unit.

== Discography ==
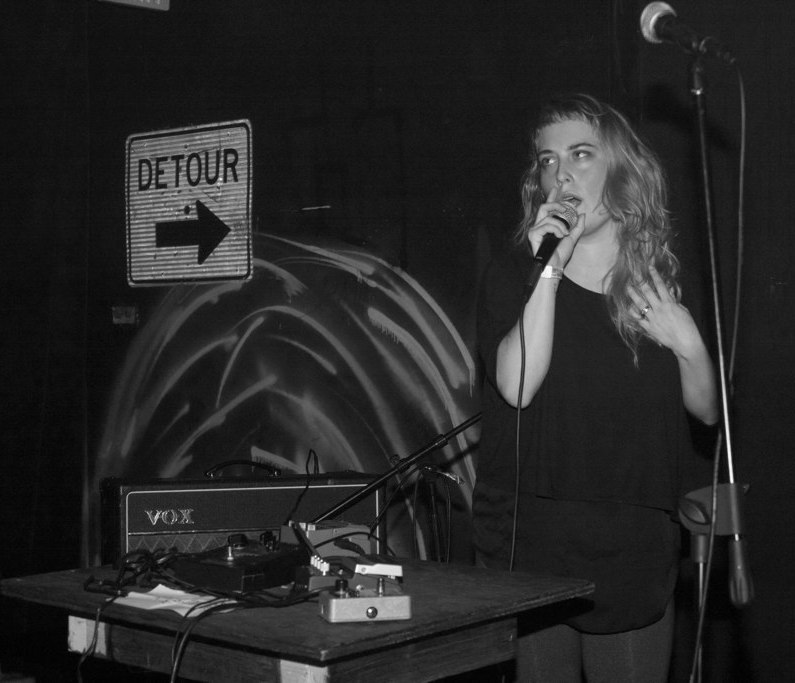
Jae Matthews performing with Boy Harsher in 2014

Studio albums

- Yr Body Is Nothing (2016)
- Careful (2019)
- Country Girl Uncut (2019)
- The Runner (Original Soundtrack) (2022)
- Get Mean (2026)

EPs

- Lesser Man (2014)
- Pain (2015)
- Country Girl EP (2017)
- Burn It Down (2022)

Singles

- "Motion" (2017)
- "Country Girl" (2017)
- "Run" (2017)
- "Pain II" (2018)
- "Pain" (The Soft Moon Remix) (2018)
- "Face the Fire" (2018)
- "Fate" (2018)
- "LA" (2019)
- ”Tears” (2019)
- ”Come Closer” (2019)
- "R.O.V. (New Beat Edit) // Part Time Punks Session" (2020)
- “Machina (ft. Mariana Saldaña)” (2022)
- ”Jeans” (2026)
- ”Hard Beat” (2026)

Remix album

- Careful Remixes, etc. (2019)

Music videos

- "Deep Well" (2016; dir. Zach Hart)
- "Motion" (2017; dir. MJ Bernier)
- "Country Girl" (2017; dir. Jae Matthews)
- "Last Days" (2018; dir. Augustus Muller)
- "Face the Fire" (2018; dir. Augustus Muller and Jae Matthews)
- "Fate" (2018; dir. Bryan M. Ferguson)
- "LA" (2019; dir. Kathleen Dycaico and Jill Ferraro)
- "Come Closer" (2019; dir. Muted Widows)
- "Send Me a Vision" (2019; dir. Augustus Muller)
- "Electric" (2020; dir. Idan Barazani)

== Filmography ==
In 2022 they released the short film “The Runner” which contains music from their soundtrack album of the same name. The film stars Kris Esfandiari.

== In popular culture ==
=== Film ===
- The 2022 indie horror film Terrifier 2, directed by Damien Leone, features the track "Pain", from the band's 2014 EP, Lesser Man. It appears at 1h24'42", during the party scene.
