= Zeros (The Soft Moon album) =

Studio album by The Soft Moon
- Released: October 30, 2012
- Recorded: February 2012 – June 2012; Ruminator Audio; San Francisco, CA
- Genre: Post-punk
- Length: 34:15 (standard); 36:16 (iTunes version)
- Label: Captured Tracks
- Producer: Luis Vasquez, Monte Vallier

The Soft Moon chronology
Total Decay (2011)	Zeros (2012)	Deeper (2015)

Professional ratings
Review scores
Source	Rating
AllMusic	4/5 stars
Pitchfork	7.0

Zeros is the second full-length studio album by American post-punk band the Soft Moon. It was released on October 30, 2012 by Captured Tracks. The album was composed entirely by frontman Luis Vasquez. Production and mixing duties were completed by Monte Vallier at Ruminator Audio. The theme of the record has been described as post-apocalyptic. Comparing the record to previous releases, Vasquez told Fact Magazine, "My approach for Zeros was to be more conceptual, thematic, and visual." As of 2017, the album holds a score of 72 on the aggregate review site Metacritic, indicating "generally favorable reviews" by music critics.

== Track listing ==
No.	Title	Length
1.	"It Ends"	1:50
2.	"Machines"	2:46
3.	"Zeros"	4:38
4.	"Insides"	4:01
5.	"Remember the Future"	3:22
6.	"Crush"	3:58
7.	"Die Life"	3:36
8.	"Lost Years"	4:35
9.	"Want"	3:38
10.	"ƨbnƎ tI"	1:51
Total length:		34:12

== Personnel ==
- Josh Bonati – mastering at Bonati Mastering, Brooklyn, NY
- Luis Vasquez – keyboards, guitar, bass, composition, songwriting
- Monte Vallier – production, mixing, additional and replacement recordings
