= Urban Heat =

Post-punk band from Austin, Texas, USA

- Origin: Austin, Texas, United States
- Genres: Post-punk; Synthpop; Synth-rock; Darkwave; Gothic rock
- Years active: 2019 – 2026 (hiatus)
- Labels: Artoffact Records; Spaceflight Records
- Members: Jonathan Horstmann
- Past members: Kevin D. Naquin; Paxel Foley
- Website: urbanheatband.com

Urban Heat is an American post-punk band from Austin, Texas. It consists of frontman Jonathan Horstmann, with former members being Kevin D. Naquin (synths, programming) and Paxel Foley (bass, samples). Their single "Have You Ever" went viral on TikTok in 2022, and received the 2023 Austin Music Award for Best Song.

== History ==
Horstmann, a native of California, was raised in a conservative Christian family, and had little exposure to popular music growing up. He moved to Austin in his 20s, where he had played in Austin-area punk and indie rock bands. After the birth of his first child in 2019, he began writing songs using synthesizers, so he could write music with headphones on. He had also recently been diagnosed with OCD and bipolar disorder, and become sober after a history of alcohol and drug addiction. Although Horstmann had intended for a solo project, Naquin demanded they collaborate once he heard his demos. Foley was then recruited to play bass. Horstmann was familiar with Naquin and Foley from the Austin indie community: he met Naquin at a video shoot for the musician SORNE, and he and Foley were part of the same group of fixie riders.

The band's progress was halted by the COVID-19 pandemic in Austin, Texas. They were slated to play at the 2020 SXSW festival, which was cancelled. Horstmann took his family to North Carolina to stay with in-laws for three months. Despite the interruption, Urban Heat released six singles before their debut album, Wellness, came out in 2022. The band played at SXSW and the Austin City Limits Music Festival in 2022. In 2023 they played SXSW again, the Cruel World Festival, and toured.

Their album The Tower was released on the 16th August 2024, 9 days after the announcement of their supporting role on the 'Belaya Polosa' tour by Belarussian band, Molchat Doma.

== Discography ==
- Wellness (EP) (2022)
- Goodbye Horses (single) (cover of Q Lazzarus) (2023)
- The Tower (2024)

=== Other appearances ===
Title	Year	Band	Album
"Ava Adore"	2026	The Smashing Pumpkins	Sending Hearts To All My Dearies: A Tribute To The Smashing Pumpkins
