= Adore (album) =

Studio album by the Smashing Pumpkins
- Released: June 2, 1998
- Recorded: June 1997 – March 1998
- Studios: Sunset Sound (Los Angeles), Village Recorder (Los Angeles), CRC (Chicago) & various other unspecified studios
- Genres: Electronic rock; gothic rock; art rock; synth-pop; industrial rock
- Length: 73:25
- Label: Virgin
- Producers: Billy Corgan; Flood; Brad Wood

The Smashing Pumpkins chronology
The Aeroplane Flies High (1996)	Adore (1998)	Machina/The Machines of God (2000)

Singles from Adore
- 1. "Ava Adore" Released: May 18, 1998; 2. "Perfect" Released: September 7, 1998

Alternate cover
- Vinyl cover/2014 reissue cover

Adore is the fourth studio album by the American alternative rock band the Smashing Pumpkins, released on June 2, 1998, by Virgin Records. After the multi-platinum success of Mellon Collie and the Infinite Sadness and a subsequent world tour, Adore was considered "one of the most anticipated albums of 1998" by MTV. Recording the album proved to be a challenge as the band members struggled with lingering interpersonal problems, musical uncertainty in the wake of three increasingly successful rock albums, and the departure of drummer Jimmy Chamberlin. Frontman Billy Corgan would later characterize Adore as made by "a band falling apart". Corgan was also going through a divorce and the death of his mother while recording the album.

The result was a much more subdued and electronica-tinged sound that Greg Kot of Rolling Stone magazine called "a complete break with the past". The album divided the Smashing Pumpkins fan base and was not as commercially successful as their previous two albums. However, similar to the band's other releases across the decade, the album was critically acclaimed, with praise directed at the experimentation with electronic elements and the darker lyrical and sonic direction.

It became the band's third straight album to be nominated for the Grammy Award for Best Alternative Music Performance and has retrospectively gained a cult following. A remastered and expanded version of the album was released on CD and vinyl in September 2014 as a part of the band's project to reissue their back catalogue from 1991 to 2000. It is their first album not to feature an official drummer.

== Background ==
The Smashing Pumpkins had cemented their place as a cultural force with 1995's multi-platinum Mellon Collie and the Infinite Sadness. Feeling the limitations of their guitar-driven hard rock sound, the band had started to branch out during the making of Mellon Collie, and, after the chart-topping success of the electronic-leaning "1979", the band zeroed in on electronica. As the sprawling and massively successful Infinite Sadness tour wound down, Billy Corgan found himself facing many difficult issues, including musical burnout, the absence of his "best friend and musical soul mate in the band" Jimmy Chamberlin, the end of his marriage, and the death of his mother to cancer.

During this period, the band released two new singles on movie soundtracks—"Eye" and "The End Is the Beginning Is the End". Both songs incorporated electronic elements, yet retained the hard rock elements of the band's previous material; one reviewer called the two singles "balls-out, full-energy chargers" and wrote off the Pumpkins' previous remarks that the upcoming album would "rock" less. However, the new album material Corgan was writing consisted mainly of simple acoustic songs. Corgan, James Iha, D'arcy Wretzky, and Matt Walker spent a few days in the studio in February 1997 laying down demos mostly as live takes, and the band hoped to quickly record an entire album in such a manner. Corgan, hoping to maintain the band's progressive rock-inspired experimentation, soon had second thoughts about this approach and began envisioning a hybrid of folk rock and electronica that was at once "ancient" and "futuristic".

== Recording ==
The Smashing Pumpkins started demoing in February 1997 and recorded 30 songs for the album which, at one point, looked set to be a double album. The band subsequently cut the number of tracks on the album to 14.

After playing several festival dates in summer 1997, the band began working at a variety of Chicago studios with producer Brad Wood—with whom Corgan previously had worked in the early 1990s. While Mellon Collie had mostly been recorded with the full participation of all the band members, the band dynamics during the new sessions soon muddled as Corgan, uninspired by his bandmates, worked mostly alone. Wood, too, was leaving Corgan unsatisfied, so, after six weeks in Chicago, the band—minus Wood and Matt Walker—relocated to Los Angeles and started work at Sunset Sound, with Corgan now the de facto producer.

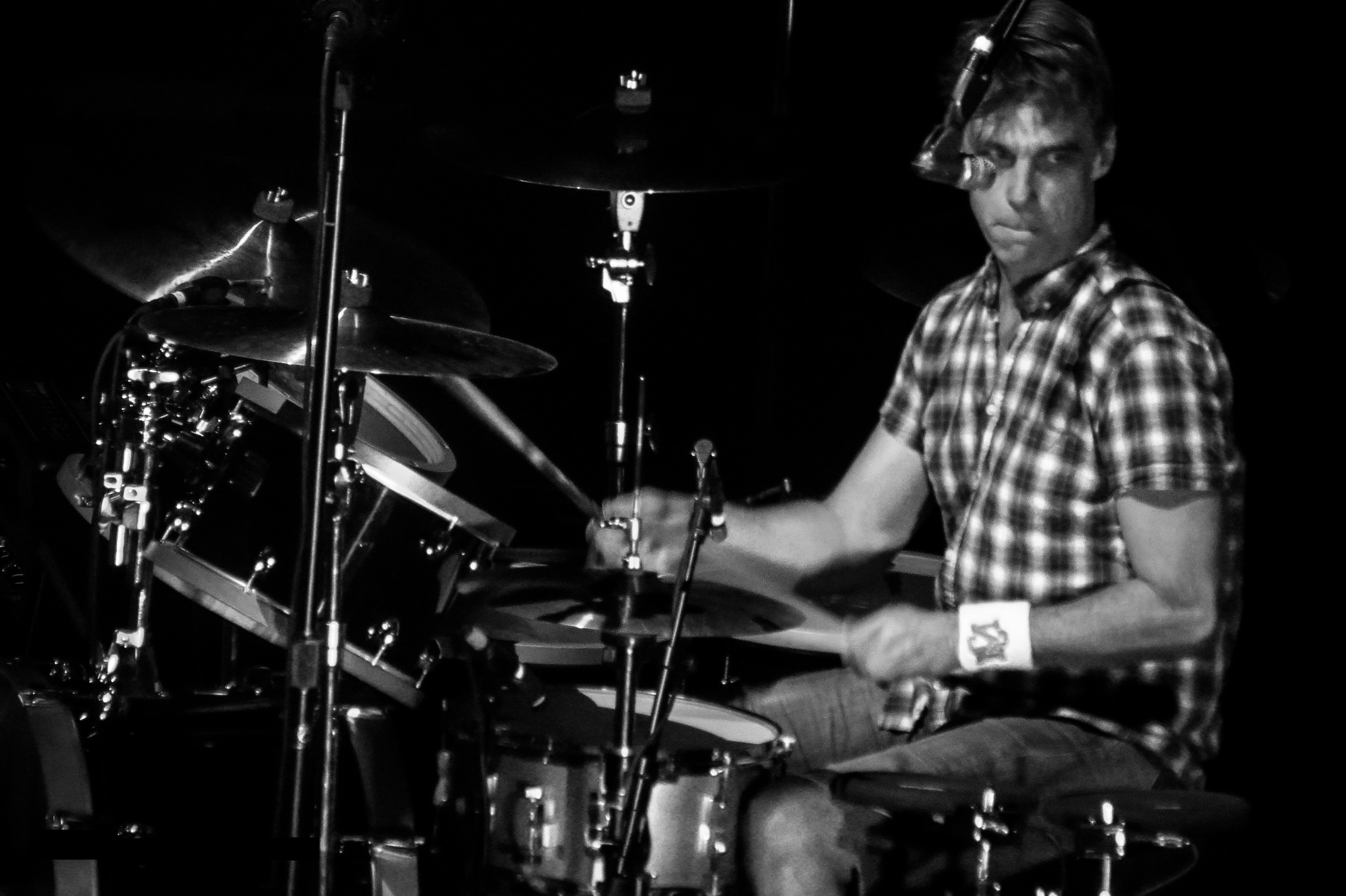
Due to Jimmy Chamberlin being fired from the Smashing Pumpkins, Soundgarden drummer Matt Cameron was one of several percussionists brought into the studio to record with the band.

The band rented a house and hoped living communally would foster good relations and a happier recording environment. According to Corgan, Iha refused to live in the house and rarely visited. The recording sessions continued to be slow-moving and heavily technical. In the absence of a drummer, the band used a drum machine as it had in its earliest incarnation. The band also enlisted Joey Waronker, of Beck's band, and Matt Cameron, of Soundgarden and Pearl Jam, for a few songs each. Bon Harris of Nitzer Ebb contributed electronic sequencing and sounds to eight album tracks, with the band giving him mostly free rein.

At the behest of the band's management, Rick Rubin was brought in to produce one song, "Let Me Give the World to You", but the song was left off the album, later to be re-recorded for Machina II/The Friends & Enemies of Modern Music. With around thirty songs recorded, Corgan began to see an end and enlisted Mellon Collie co-producer Flood to help finish the recording, pull the album together, and mix the songs.

Art direction for the album is credited to Frank Olinsky, Billy Corgan, and Corgan's then-girlfriend and frequent collaborator Yelena Yemchuk. The artwork for the album and its singles consisted almost entirely of black-and-white photographs shot by Yemchuk, many of which featured model Amy Wesson.

=== Music ===
Corgan was deliberately setting out to widen his band's sound and message, explaining that he was not "talking to teenagers anymore. I'm talking to everyone now. It's a wider dialogue. I'm talking to people who are older than me and younger than me, and our generation as well." He said much of the record was "an attempt to go back to what's important at a musical core and build it outward". He would later reflect that he was "stuck on the idea that [he] needed to prove [he] was an artist, which is the death knell of any artist".

The music on Adore has been categorized by reviewers as electronic rock, gothic rock, art rock, synth-pop, and industrial rock. Distorted guitars and live drums, the previous hallmarks of the Pumpkins sound, took a back seat in a sonic palette that included much more synthesizers, drum programming, acoustic guitar, and piano. At least five songs on the album are driven chiefly by piano.

"Tear" was written for the Lost Highway soundtrack but was rejected by David Lynch in favor of "Eye". "Pug" was originally recorded as a "minor key blues death march" with drums by Matt Cameron, while the album version uses drum programming. The only song on the album to feature Cameron, "For Martha", is a tribute to Corgan's mother that was primarily recorded as one live take.

Apart from being the first album without Jimmy Chamberlin, Adore was the first album to not include writing contributions from James Iha, who was concurrently working on his solo album Let It Come Down. However, he did contribute the track "Summer" to the "Perfect" single.

== Promotion and release ==
"Ava Adore"
Sample of "Ava Adore", the first single from Adore (1998), which emphasizes the band's new electronic music-based sound via the use of drum machines and effects.

The lead-up to Adore was marked by conflicting statements as to the album's sound—Corgan initially said the band was heading in the direction of the heavy-metal-guitar-and-electronic music-driven "The End Is the Beginning Is the End" in summer 1997. while the band's management reported the album would be all acoustic. In early 1998, Corgan called the sound "arcane night music", elaborating, "The people that say it's acoustic will be wrong. The people that say it's electronic will be wrong. The people that say it's a Pumpkins record will be wrong. I will try to make something that is indescribable". Further complicating the situation was the record label's initial insistence to use the Rick Rubin-produced, upbeat, poppy song "Let Me Give the World to You" as the album's lead single, something Corgan strongly objected to, fearing it would give listeners the wrong first impression of the album. Corgan had to drop the song off the track list altogether to avoid using it as a single.

Adore was released on June 2, 1998, in most of the world, the same day the video for first single "Ava Adore" premiered. The album booklet and music video showcased the band's new gothic look. The second single, "Perfect", was also accompanied by a music video, which debuted on August 16.

== Touring ==
After the release of Adore, the band embarked on a scaled-back 14-show world tour entitled An Evening with the Smashing Pumpkins to support Adore. Abroad, the Pumpkins played at what had been called an "eclectic mix of interesting venues", among them the rooftop of a FNAC record store in Paris, France, in the botanic gardens of Brussels, Belgium, at the Cannes Film Festival, and at an International Shipping Harbor in Sydney, Australia. In the United States, the Pumpkins donated 100% of their ticket profits to local charities (yet one stop on the tour, Minneapolis, was a free concert and underestimated the attendance of the show). In the end, the Pumpkins, with the help of their fans, raised over $2.8 million in this manner.

The lineup was the most expansive yet, including former John Mellencamp and Melissa Etheridge drummer Kenny Aronoff, percussionists Dan Morris and Stephen Hodges, and David Bowie pianist Mike Garson. Violinist Lisa Germano was also set to appear, but did not ultimately appear in the touring lineup. The set was mainly Adore material, with only a handful of reworked Mellon Collie songs and no songs from prior to 1995, eliminating many of their radio hits and fan favorites, with the exception of some shows performed in South American countries like Brazil and Chile, where they played for the first time, so they included old hits like "Today" and "Disarm".

In retrospect, Corgan regretted the decision to hire the two percussionists to play alongside Aronoff, instead of having the drummer play along with loops from the album. "That drove Kenny up the wall because Kenny has perfect time and one guy played on top and the other behind. I remember Kenny saying, 'I feel like I'm tripping on LSD' because he kept hearing things that were not in time, and it drove him crazy," said Corgan in the Adore reissue liner notes. Performing with Garson was also challenging because, according to Corgan, "he made a decision 40 years ago that he would live in the intuitive flow of what he was feeling, so he literally cannot play the same thing twice. So we'd have gigs where he'd have that same magic as on Aladdin Sane and the next night he'd come and play the extreme opposite style—like honkytonk. I really respect Mike, but to play with him was always challenging; precisely because he is such a supreme musician."

== Reception ==
Professional ratings
Review scores
Source	Rating
AllMusic	3.5/5 stars
Chicago Sun-Times	4/4 stars
Entertainment Weekly	B+
The Guardian	4/5 stars
Los Angeles Times	3.5/4 stars
NME	5/10
Pitchfork	8.1/10 (1998); 8.5/10 (2014)
Rolling Stone	3.5/5 stars
Select	3/5
Spin	5/10

Critical reception to Adore was generally positive. Greg Kot of Rolling Stone magazine regarded Adore as "the most intimate album the Pumpkins have ever made and also the prettiest, a parade of swooning melodies and gentle, unfolding nocturnes". Ryan Schreiber of Pitchfork described the album as "the Pumpkins' best offering since Siamese Dream". Stephen Thomas Erlewine of AllMusic described Adore as "a hushed, elegiac album that sounds curiously out of time". Adore was considered one of "an inspiring range of 25 classic alternative American albums" by The Guardian.

The lyrics received particular praise from critics—Jim DeRogatis of the Chicago Sun-Times, who in 1993 had criticized Corgan's lyrics as "too often sound[ing] like sophomoric poetry", said Corgan "took a big leap forward as a lyricist" starting with Adore. Schreiber, who criticized Mellon Collie as "lyrical rock-bottom", called Adore's lyrics "poetic", particularly singling out "To Sheila". Greg Kot emphasized the "oblique, private longings, and weighty, sometimes awkward conceits" in the lyrics, while David Browne of Entertainment Weekly called them "unsettled and unsettling". The contributions of Wretzky and Iha also received praise, with Kot noting that "Iha's quirky guitar accents and Wretzky's unflashy resolve [...] give Adore a warmth and camaraderie no other Pumpkins album can match."

Despite this, public reception to Adore was lukewarm. Adore entered the Billboard 200 at number two (behind Master P's MP da Last Don) with 174,000 units of the album sold in its first week, and was certified platinum by the Recording Industry Association of America (RIAA) five weeks later, but the album soon departed the charts, leaving Adore far short of the sales figures of its predecessors. Two additional promotional singles, "Crestfallen" and "To Sheila", were released to radio stations but failed to gain traction and were never released as commercial singles. As of May 2005, Adore has sold 1.1 million units in the US and at least three times as many copies worldwide.

Corgan blamed himself for the record's reception with the public, saying he "made the mistake of telling people it was a techno record" and that if he "would have told everyone Adore was the Pumpkins' acoustic album we would have never had the problems that we had". Corgan wrote on the band's website that the album's title was "misunderstood" and "a joke that no one ever got", explaining that Adore was meant as a play on "A Door", meaning the album would offer a new entrance to the band's career. In 2005, Corgan would call the making of the album "one of the most painful experiences of my life".

== Track listing ==
All tracks are written by Billy Corgan.

Adore track listing
No.	Title	Length
1.	"To Sheila"	4:45
2.	"Ava Adore"	4:20
3.	"Perfect"	3:22
4.	"Daphne Descends"	4:38
5.	"Once Upon a Time"	4:06
6.	"Tear"	5:52
7.	"Crestfallen"	4:09
8.	"Appels + Oranjes"	3:34
9.	"Pug"	4:46
10.	"The Tale of Dusty and Pistol Pete"	4:33
11.	"Annie-Dog"	3:36
12.	"Shame"	6:37
13.	"Behold! The Night Mare"	5:12
14.	"For Martha"	8:17
15.	"Blank Page"	4:51
16.	"17" (not on vinyl pressings)	0:17
Total length:		73:25

Japanese edition bonus track
No.	Title	Length
16.	"Once in a While" ("17" moves to track 17)	3:33

=== 2014 CD/DVD reissue ===
As part of Virgin/Universal Music's reissue campaign, a special edition of the album was released on September 23, 2014. The release consists of the original album remastered and 91 bonus tracks of previously unreleased material, demos and alternate versions of Adore-era songs. It was released in five formats: the physical box set containing all 107 tracks, the digital deluxe edition containing 74 of the bonus tracks, as well as single disc CD and double-LP versions containing only the stereo remaster of the album. The digital version of the reissue was released on October 3, 2014.

The actual Adore album was remastered by Bob Ludwig. The entire set includes session outtakes and a mono version of the album, with Corgan saying the new mixes contain "elements from the original sessions that were stored digitally, but never used; such as some of the work done by Bon Harris".

The package also includes a DVD consisting of footage of the band's show from August 4, 1998, at the Fox Theater in Atlanta, Georgia.

2014 Reissue CD 1: Adore Stereo Remastered
No.	Title	Length
1.	"To Sheila"	4:40
2.	"Ava Adore"	4:30
3.	"Perfect"	3:23
4.	"Daphne Descends"	4:41
5.	"Once Upon a Time"	4:04
6.	"Tear"	5:56
7.	"Crestfallen"	3:57
8.	"Appels + Oranjes"	3:35
9.	"Pug"	4:54
10.	"The Tale of Dusty and Pistol Pete"	4:35
11.	"Annie-Dog"	3:37
12.	"Shame"	6:42
13.	"Behold! The Night Mare"	5:12
14.	"For Martha"	8:18
15.	"Blank Page"	4:58
16.	"17"	0:17

2014 Reissue CD 2: Adore Mono Remastered
No.	Title	Length
1.	"To Sheila"	4:39
2.	"Ava Adore"	4:24
3.	"Perfect"	3:29
4.	"Daphne Descends"	4:43
5.	"Once Upon a Time"	4:06
6.	"Tear"	5:51
7.	"Crestfallen"	3:56
8.	"Appels + Oranjes"	3:39
9.	"Pug"	4:48
10.	"The Tale of Dusty and Pistol Pete"	4:33
11.	"Annie-Dog"	3:39
12.	"Shame"	6:39
13.	"Behold! The Night Mare"	5:12
14.	"For Martha"	7:07
15.	"Blank Page"	4:50

2014 Reissue CD 3: In a State of Passage
No.	Title	Length
1.	"Blissed and Gone" (Sadlands demo)	4:17
2.	"Christmastime" (Sadlands demo)	3:27
3.	"My Mistake" (Sadlands demo)	4:50
4.	"Sparrow" (Sadlands demo)	2:55
5.	"Valentine" (Sadlands demo)	4:22
6.	"The Tale of Dusty and Pistol Pete" (Sadlands demo)	5:23
7.	"What If?" (Alternate version of "Appels + Oranjes" / Streeterville demo)	3:27
8.	"Chewing Gum" (CRC demo)	3:00
9.	"The Tale of Dusty and Pistol Pete" (CRC demo)	5:01
10.	"The Ethers Tragic" (CRC demo/2014 mix – Instrumental)	2:49
11.	"The Guns of Love Disastrous" (CRC demo/2014 mix – Instrumental)	2:03
12.	"Annie-Dog" (CRC demo/Take 10)	3:25
13.	"Once in a While" (CRC demo/2014 mix)	3:34
14.	"Do You Close Your Eyes When You Kiss Me?" (CRC demo)	3:07
15.	"For Martha" (CRC demo/Take 1)	7:19
16.	"My Mistake" (CRC demo/Take 1)	4:00
17.	"Blissed and Gone" (CRC demo)	3:29
18.	"For Martha" (CRC demo/Take 2 – Instrumental)	5:39

2014 Reissue CD 4: Chalices, Palaces and Deep Pools
No.	Title	Length
1.	"For Martha" (Symphonic Snippet – Instrumental)	2:40
2.	"Crestfallen" (Matt Walker 2014 "Reimagined" version)	3:39
3.	"To Sheila" (Early Banjo version)	4:24
4.	"Ava Adore" (Puffy Combs 1998 remix)	4:37
5.	"O Rio" (Sadlands Demo – Instrumental)	2:28
6.	"Waiting"	3:49
7.	"Once Upon a Time" (Sadlands demo)	4:20
8.	"Eye" (2014 mix)	4:54
9.	"Saturnine" (Piano and voice version)	3:47
10.	"Cash Car Star" (Matt Walker 2014 "Reimagined" version)	4:00
11.	"Pug" (Matt Walker 2014 "Reimagined" version)	4:35
12.	"Perfect" (No strings version)	3:24
13.	"It's Alright" (Instrumental)	4:20
14.	"Czarina" (Take 1)	3:57
15.	"Indecision" (Sadlands demo)	2:43
16.	"Blank Page" (Early version)	4:57

2014 Reissue CD 5: Malice, Callous and Fools
No.	Title	Writer(s)	Length
1.	"Let Me Give the World to You" (Rick Rubin/Adore version)		4:19
2.	"Tear" (from digital transfer)		5:52
3.	"Cross"		4:53
4.	"Because You Are"		3:51
5.	"Jersey Shore" (Sadlands demo)		3:41
6.	"Shame" (Take 1)		4:54
7.	"Summer" (Instrumental)	James Iha	3:08
8.	"Blissed and Gone" (Drone version)		5:11
9.	"Heaven" (Sadlands demo – Instrumental)		4:02
10.	"Daphne Descends" (Matt Walker 2014 "Reimagined" version)		5:06
11.	"Saturnine" (Matt Walker 2014 "Reimagined" version)		3:57
12.	"Behold! The Night Mare" (Alternate vocal)		4:59
13.	"Perfect" (Acoustic demo)		3:18
14.	"Do You Close Your Eyes?"		4:22
15.	"The Beginning Is the End Is the Beginning"		5:00

2014 Reissue CD 6: Kissed Alive Too
No.	Title	Writer(s)	Length
1.	"Ava Adore" (Live/São Paulo session)		4:47
2.	"Daphne Descends" (Live/São Paulo session)		4:27
3.	"The Tale of Dusty and Pistol Pete" (Live/São Paulo session)		4:42
4.	"Tear" (Live/São Paulo session)		7:01
5.	"Shame" (Live Mancow's Morning Madhouse session, Chicago)		4:19
6.	"Blank Page" (Live Mancow's Morning Madhouse session, Chicago)		7:52
7.	"To Sheila" (Live at Ryman Auditorium, Nashville)		7:16
8.	"Money (That's What I Want)" (Live at Dodger Stadium, LA)	Berry Gordy Jr., Janie Bradford	3:30
9.	"X.Y.U. Medley" (Live at Dodger Stadium, LA)	Billy Corgan, Benjamin Rossi, Larry Carter, Debora Iyall, Peter Wood, Frank Zincavage	11:19
10.	"Transmission" (Live at rehearsals, Chicago)	Ian Curtis, Bernard Sumner, Peter Hook, Stephen Morris	12:51

2014 Reissue DVD: Fox Theater, Atlanta, GA – August 4, 1998
No.	Title	Writer(s)	Length
1.	"To Sheila"		7:11
2.	"Behold! The Night Mare"		5:16
3.	"Pug"		5:06
4.	"Crestfallen"		4:30
5.	"Ava Adore"		5:41
6.	"Tear"		9:59
7.	"Annie-Dog"		4:27
8.	"Perfect"		3:35
9.	"Thru the Eyes of Ruby"		10:15
10.	"Tonight, Tonight"		4:19
11.	"Once Upon a Time"		4:37
12.	"The Tale of Dusty and Pistol Pete" (Includes percussionist solo leading into the next song)		10:20
13.	"Bullet with Butterfly Wings"		5:30
14.	"Shame"		9:17
15.	"For Martha"		8:25
16.	"Blank Page"		9:48
17.	"Transmission"	Ian Curtis, Bernard Sumner, Peter Hook, Stephen Morris	25:52

== Personnel ==
=== The Smashing Pumpkins ===
- Billy Corgan – vocals, rhythm and lead guitar, piano, keyboards, production, mixing, art direction and design
- James Iha – lead and rhythm guitar, vocals
- D'arcy Wretzky – bass guitar, rhythm guitar (uncredited)

=== Additional musicians ===
- Matt Walker – drums on "To Sheila", "Ava Adore", "Daphne Descends", "Tear", "The Tale of Dusty and Pistol Pete", "Annie-Dog", and "Behold! The Night Mare"
- Matt Cameron – drums on "For Martha"
- Joey Waronker – drums on "Perfect", additional drums on "Once Upon a Time" and "Pug"
- Dennis Flemion – additional vocals in "To Sheila" and "Behold! The Night Mare"
- Jimmy Flemion – additional vocals in "To Sheila" and "Behold! The Night Mare"
- Bon Harris – additional programming on tracks 2, 3, 4, 5, 7, 8, 9, and 13; additional vocals in "For Martha"
- Brad Wood – additional production and engineering on tracks 1, 2, 4, 6, 13, and 15, additional vocals in "Behold! The Night Mare", organ in "Blank Page"

=== Technical ===
- Robbie Adams – engineering, mixing
- Chris Brickley – recording assistant
- Flood – additional production, mixing
- Eric Greedy – mix assistant
- Steve Johnson – recording assistant
- Ron Lowe – recording assistant
- Jay Nicholas – mix assistant
- Frank Olinsky – art direction and design
- Neil Perry – engineer, mixing
- Matt Prock – recording assistant
- Chris Shepard – engineer
- Jamie Siegel – mix assistant
- Bjorn Thorsrud – digital editing, engineering
- Ed Tinley – recording assistant
- Andy Van Dette – digital editing and compilation
- Jeff Vereb – recording assistant
- Howie Weinberg – mastering
- Howard C. Willing – engineering, mix assistant
- John Wydrycs – mix assistant
- Yelena Yemchuk – photography, art direction and design

== Charts ==
=== Weekly charts ===
Chart (1998)	Peak position
Australian Albums (ARIA)	1
Austrian Albums (Ö3 Austria)	7
Belgian Albums (Ultratop Flanders)	1
Belgian Albums (Ultratop Wallonia)	8
Canadian Albums (Billboard)	2
Danish Albums (Hitlisten)	4
Dutch Albums (Album Top 100)	5
Finnish Albums (Suomen virallinen lista)	5
French Albums (SNEP)	1
German Albums (Offizielle Top 100)	3
Irish Albums (IRMA)	1
Italian Albums (FIMI)	3
New Zealand Albums (RMNZ)	1
Norwegian Albums (VG-lista)	1
Portuguese Albums (AFP)	1
Scottish Albums (OCC)	5
Spanish Albums (AFYVE)	10
Swedish Albums (Sverigetopplistan)	4
Swiss Albums (Schweizer Hitparade)	13
UK Albums (Official Charts)	5
US Billboard 200	2

Chart (2025)	Peak position
Greek Albums (IFPI)	81

=== Year-end charts ===
Chart (1998)	Position
Australian Albums (ARIA)	47
Belgian Albums (Ultratop Flanders)	65
Belgian Albums (Ultratop Wallonia)	75
Canadian Albums (RPM)	38
European Albums (Music & Media)	27
French Albums (SNEP)	63
German Albums (Offizielle Top 100)	36
New Zealand Albums (RMNZ)	30
UK	125
US Billboard 200	86

== Certifications ==
Sales certifications for Adore
Region	Certification	Certified units/sales
Australia (ARIA)	Platinum	70,000^{^}
Canada (Music Canada)	2× Platinum	200,000^{^}
Denmark (IFPI Danmark)	Gold	25,000^{^}
France (SNEP)	Gold	100,000^{*}
Japan (RIAJ)	Gold	100,000^{^}
New Zealand (RMNZ)	Platinum	15,000^{^}
Norway (IFPI Norway)	Gold	25,000^{*}
Spain (Promusicae)	Gold	50,000^{^}
United Kingdom (BPI)	Gold	100,000^{^}
United States (RIAA)	Platinum	1,000,000^{^}
^{*} Sales figures based on certification alone.^{^} Shipments figures based on certification alone.
