= Criminal (album) =

Studio album by the Soft Moon
- Released: February 2, 2018
- Genre: Industrial
- Length: 39:39
- Label: Sacred Bones
- Producers: Luis Vasquez; Maurizio Baggio

The Soft Moon chronology
Deeper (2015)	Criminal (2018)	Exister (2022)

Professional ratings
Aggregate scores
Source	Rating
Metacritic	78/100
Review scores
Source	Rating
The 405	8/10
AllMusic	4/5 stars
The A.V. Club	B
Crack Magazine	7/10
DIY	4/5 stars
Drowned in Sound	8/10
Exclaim!	8/10
The Line of Best Fit	8/10
Pitchfork	7.2/10
PopMatters	7/10

Criminal is the fourth studio album by American post-punk band the Soft Moon. It was released on February 2, 2018 by Sacred Bones Records.

== Critical reception ==
Criminal was met with "generally favorable" reviews from critics. At Metacritic, which assigns a weighted average rating out of 100 to reviews from mainstream publications, this release received an average score of 78, based on 10 reviews. Aggregator Album of the Year gave the release a 76 out of 100 based on a critical consensus of 14 reviews.

Sean O'Neal from The A.V. Club said the album "evokes all of those classic, angry goth teen touchstones. And while that poetry-journal melodrama grows a tad exhausting by album’s end, there are plenty of deliciously bitter pleasures here for anyone who similarly loves brooding in that blacked-out, candlelit bedroom of the mind." Francisco Gonçalves Silva from The 405 explained "Despite the album adopting a confessional structure, the characteristic elements of The Soft Moon’s aggression remains. And it all sounds dirtier, gritter and angrier than ever."

== Track listing ==
No.	Title	Length
1.	"Burn"	3:20
2.	"Choke"	3:09
3.	"Give Something"	4:30
4.	"Like a Father"	4:40
5.	"The Pain"	4:36
6.	"It Kills"	4:17
7.	"Ill"	2:35
8.	"Young"	3:50
9.	"Born Into This"	3:49
10.	"Criminal"	4:53

== Personnel ==
Credits adapted from AllMusic website.

- Luis Vasquez – composition, production, engineering, mastering, mixing
- Maurizio Baggio – composition, arrangement, production, engineering, mastering, mixing
- Marion Costentin – photography
