= The Soft Moon =

American musician (1979–2024)

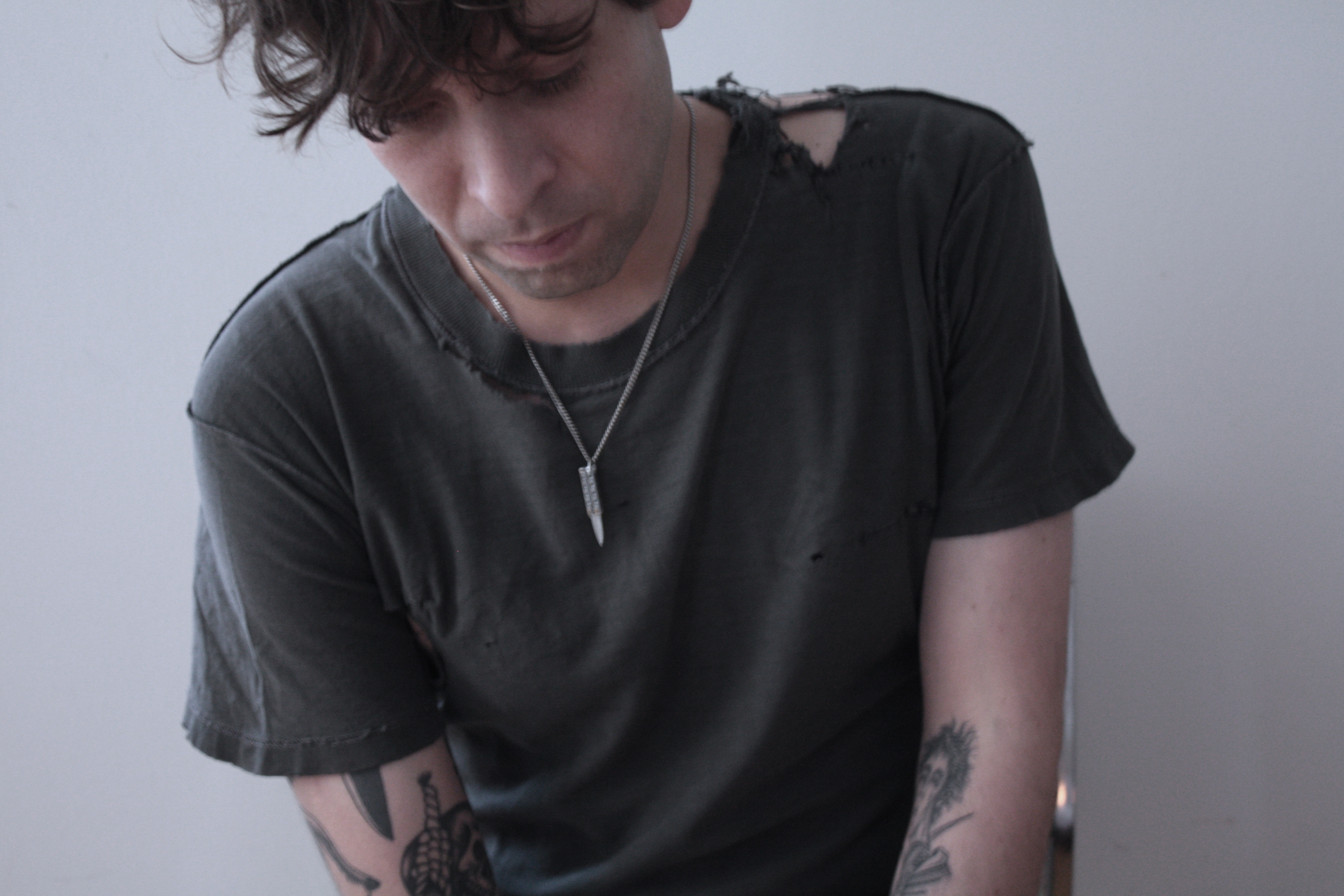
- Vasquez in 2017

Background information
- Also known as: The Soft Moon
- Born: Jose Luis Vasquez; May 30, 1979; Los Angeles, California, U.S.
- Origin: Oakland, California, U.S.
- Died: January 18, 2024 (aged 44) Los Angeles, California, U.S.
- Genres: Post-punk; dark wave; krautrock; industrial rock; electronic rock
- Occupations: Musician; composer; producer; multi-instrumentalist; singer
- Instruments: Guitar; percussion; synthesizer
- Years active: 2008–2024
- Labels: Captured Tracks; Sacred Bones
- Formerly of: Lumerians
- Website: thesoftmoon.com

Jose Luis Vasquez (May 30, 1979 – January 18, 2024) was an American musician and record producer. Vasquez was the lead vocalist, multi-instrumentalist, songwriter and sole official member of The Soft Moon, which he founded in 2009.

== Early life ==
Vasquez was born in Los Angeles, California, to a Cuban immigrant mother, and to a Mexican father who was never present in his life. At the age of nine, the family relocated to Victorville, California, a town in the Mojave Desert.

As a teenager, Vasquez started out playing punk rock inspired by Descendents, Bad Religion, Bad Brains, Fugazi and Minor Threat. After graduating from Hesperia High School, he moved to Oakland, California where he briefly played in San Francisco-based psychedelic band Lumerians as a percussionist.

== Career ==
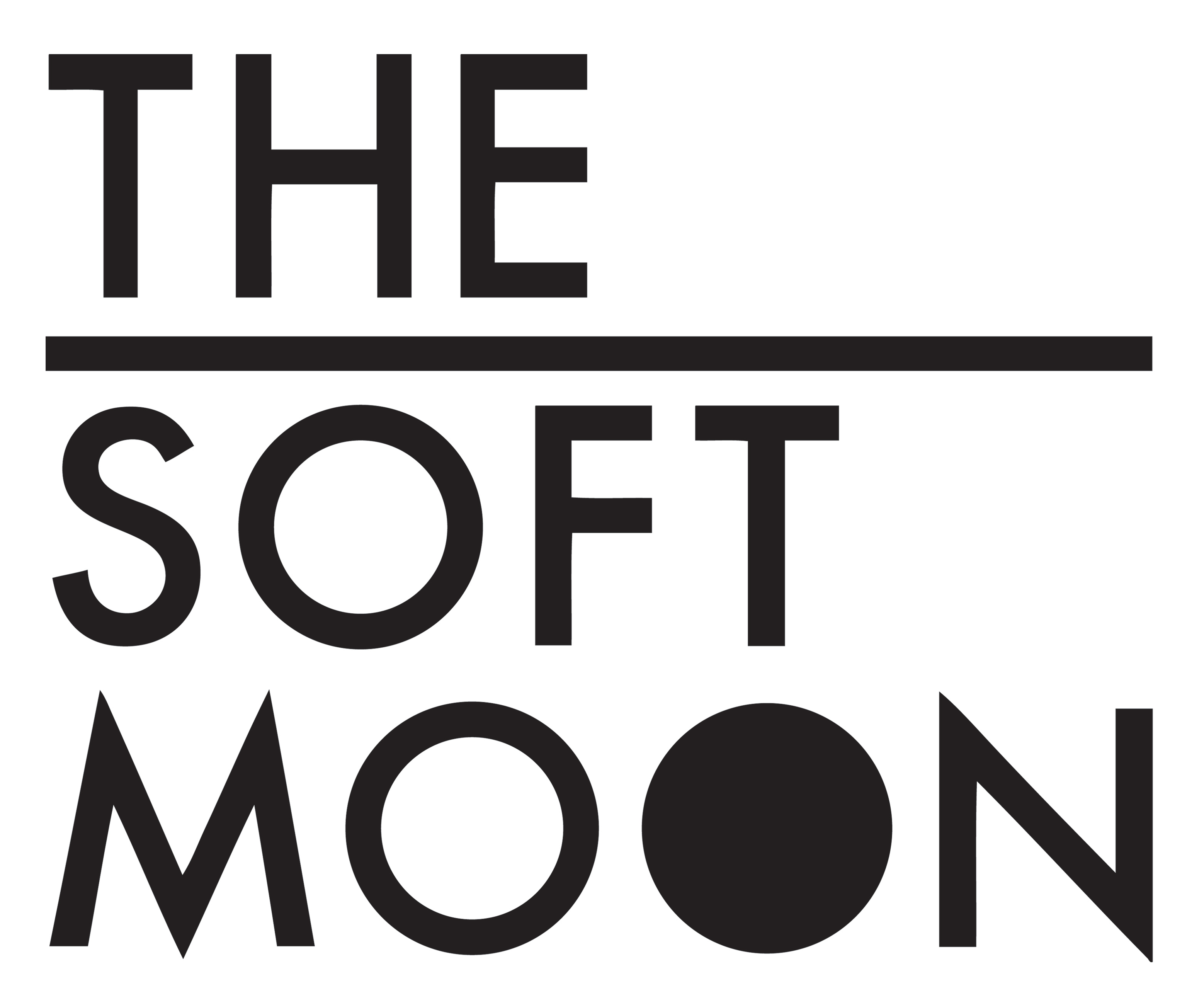
The Soft Moon original logo, designed by Vasquez

As Luis Vasquez, he created The Soft Moon project in 2009, and shortly after, Brooklyn-based label Captured Tracks approached him with a record deal. In 2010 his first single "Breathe The Fire" and "Parallels" were released on 7" vinyl under the Captured Tracks imprint. His first album with The Soft Moon was released in 2010 and the band toured in 2011, opening in the US for Interpol and Mogwai.

In 2012, Vasquez was robbed at gunpoint while walking in his Oakland neighborhood, and his backpack with a laptop containing a finished album and two years' worth of demos were stolen. In October of that year, The Soft Moon released its second album, Zeros.

He moved abroad to Venice, Italy in 2013 to write his third album, Deeper, which was released in 2015. The album's lead single, "Black", earned Best New Track honors from Pitchfork. While writing the album, The Soft Moon opened for Depeche Mode on a European leg of their Delta Machine Tour in 2014.

The Soft Moon was scheduled to open for Killing Joke's 2016 North American tour, but Killing Joke canceled because of a band member's illness. During a performance in Oakland on January 29, 2016, the band's van was broken into, with luggage, recording equipment, records and merchandise stolen.

The Soft Moon's fourth album, Criminal, was released in 2018 and was recorded in a basement studio in Vasquez's new home city of Berlin. It was his first album on Sacred Bones Records.

The Soft Moon's fifth and final album, Exister, was released on September 23, 2022. The Soft Moon performed at Roadburn Festival in Tilburg, Netherlands on April 20, 2023, and the Cruel World Festival in Pasadena, California, on May 20.

The last The Soft Moon performance was at Thalia Hall in Chicago, Illinois, as part of Sanctum Fest on October 28, 2023.

On October 18, 2023, Luis Vasquez announced via The Soft Moon's social media, that he was creating an original score for a short film entitled, Pumpkin Guts. The film was written and directed by Bryan M. Ferguson, who also directed the music video for Exister single, "Monster".

== Death ==
Vasquez died on January 18, 2024, at age 44, alongside techno DJ Silent Servant (John Juan Mendez) and Mendez's partner Simone Ling, from the effects of fentanyl, cocaine, ketamine, and ethanol. Their three bodies were discovered at Mendez's Los Angeles residence later that day after Vasquez's wife called for a welfare check. Their deaths were reported the following day.

== Discography ==
=== Studio albums ===
- The Soft Moon (Captured Tracks, 2010)
- Zeros (Captured Tracks, 2012)
- Deeper (Captured Tracks, 2015)
- Criminal (Sacred Bones Records, 2018)
- A Body of Errors (released as Luis Vasquez, 2021)
- Exister (Sacred Bones Records, 2022)

=== Remix albums ===
- Deeper Remixed (Captured Tracks / aufnahme + wiedergabe, 2016)
- Criminal Remixed (Sacred Bones Records / aufnahme + wiedergabe, 2018)
- Exister Remixed (Sacred Bones Records / BITE, 2023)

=== EPs ===
- Total Decay (Captured Tracks, 2011)

=== Singles ===
- "Breathe the Fire" (7" / Digital) – (Captured Tracks, 2010)
- "Parallels" (7" / Digital) – (Captured Tracks, 2010)
- "Die Life" (2012)
- "Insides" (2012)
- "Feel" (7" / Cassette / Digital) – (self-released, 2014)
- "Far" (2015)
- "Wasting" (2015)
- "Black" (2015)
- "Want" (2015)
- "Wrong" (2015)
- "Burn" (2018)
- "Choke" (2018)
- "It Kills" (2018)
- "Like a Father" (2018)
- "Give Something" (2018)
- "HIM (Feat. fish narc) (2022)
- "Become the Lies" (2022)
- "Monster" (2022)

=== Collaborations ===
- "Evidence" – with John Foxx and the Maths – (Captured Tracks, 2012)
- "COLORS" (HEALTH x The Soft Moon") (Loma Vista, 2020)
- "X-Rays & Šostakovic" (Matteo Vallicelli x The Soft Moon) (2021)
- "HIM" (Feat. fish narc") (Sacred Bones Records, 2022)
- "Unforgiven" (Feat. Alli Logout") (Sacred Bones Records, 2022)

=== Remixes ===
- Mogwai – "San Pedro" (The Soft Moon Remix) (2012)
- How to Destroy Angels – "Ice Age" (The Soft Moon Remix) (2012)
- Trentemøller – "Complicated" (The Soft Moon Remix) (2016)
- Boy Harsher – "Pain" (The Soft Moon Remix) (2018)
- Jakuzi – "Ne teselli ne avuntu" (The Soft Moon Remix) (2019)
- She Past Away – "Rituel" (The Soft Moon Remix) (2020)
- Qual – "VR Slaves" (The Soft Moon Remix) (2022)
- Patriarchy – "Good Boy" (The Soft Moon Remix) (2023)
- Editors – "Kiss" (The Soft Moon Remi) (2023)
- M83 – "Oceans Niagara" (The Soft Moon Remix) (2024)

=== Soundtracks ===
- Pumpkin Guts (2024)

=== Cover songs ===
- "No-one driving" (John Foxx) (2016)
- "Black Sabbath" (Black Sabbath) (2020)

== Lineup ==
Although Vasquez wrote, recorded and produced alone, he was joined by other members for live performances.

Final lineup

- Matteo Vallicelli – drums
- Luigi Pianezzola – bass guitar

Former members

- Damon Way – drum machine, sequencer, synthesizer
- Justin Anastasi – bass guitar
- Keven Tecon – drums
