= Crestfallen =

Promotional single by The Smashing Pumpkins

from the album Adore
- B-side: "Call Out Research Hook"
- Released: November 3, 1998
- Recorded: December 1997 – March 1998
- Length: 4:09
- Label: Virgin
- Songwriter: Billy Corgan
- Producer: Billy Corgan

The Smashing Pumpkins singles chronology
"Perfect" (1998)	"Crestfallen" (1998)	"The Everlasting Gaze" (1999)

"Crestfallen" is a song by the American rock band The Smashing Pumpkins, released on their 1998 album Adore. Originally scheduled as the third single from the album, the song was instead released as a promotional CD in the US. It received moderate play on modern rock stations but did not chart. The single's artwork is by Yelena Yemchuk.

The song features Billy Corgan on piano and vocals, with James Iha on lead guitar. It was the first song to include Corgan playing piano live, the first performance of which took place during the band's gig in Nashville during the promotional tour for Adore in the summer of 1998. The band also performed the song at the VH1 Fashion Awards on October 27, 1998. Billboard gave the song mixed reviews, describing it as "sluggish and anti-climactic", but praising its ambient qualities.

== In popular culture ==
"Crestfallen" was played at the end of the 2000 TV movie Homicide: Life Everlasting.

== Meaning ==
The song's message is one of "Who am I to do this to you?" According to Corgan, he was inspired by his mother's death by which he said "My mother's death helped me to refocus my priorities. It showed me the true value of my life."

== Track listing ==
All songs written by Billy Corgan

US Promo CD single (DPRO-13629)

1. "Crestfallen" – 4:09
2. "Call Out Research Hook" – 0.10
