= Zoè Zanias =

Australian musician

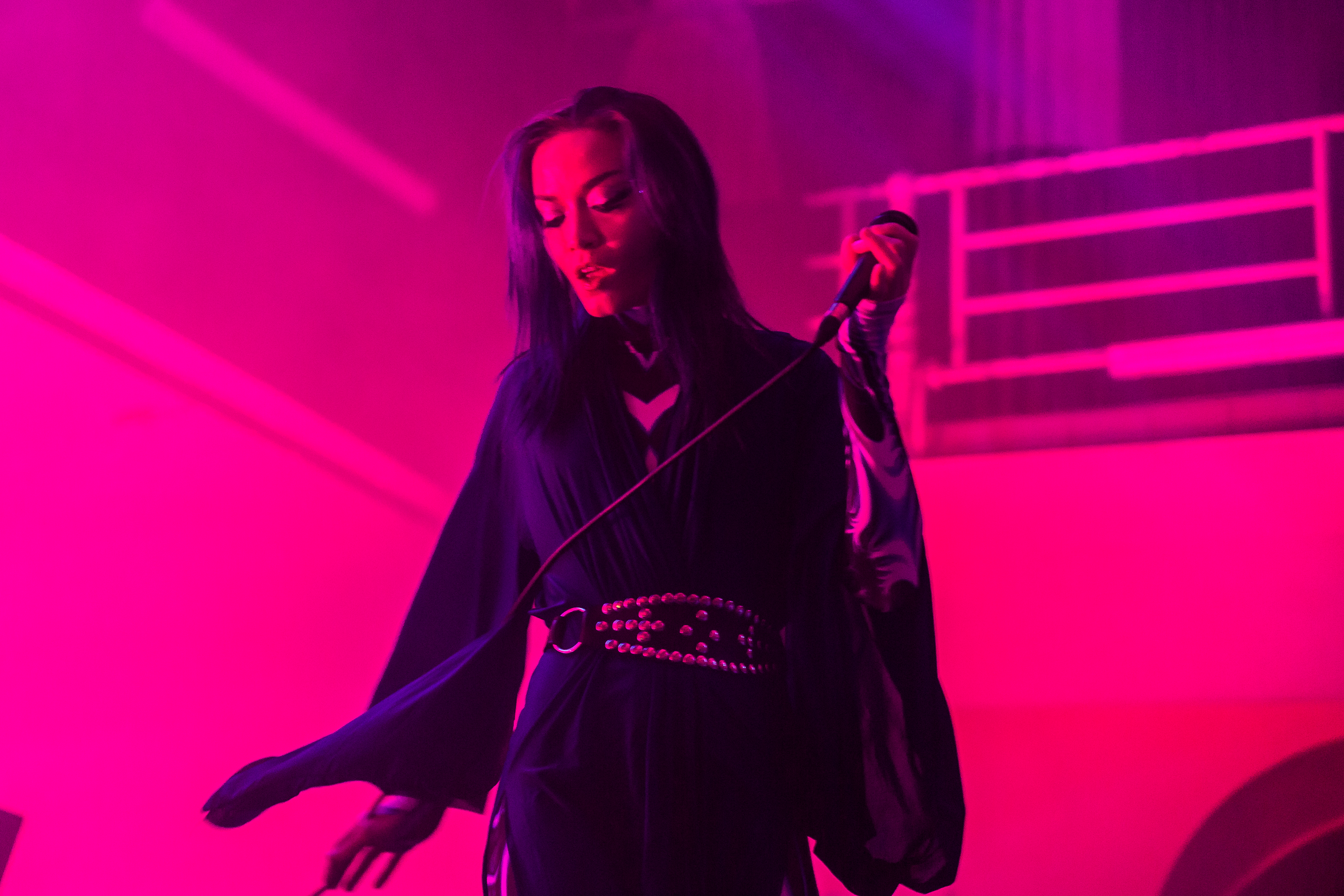
- Zanias performing at Wave-Gotik-Treffen in 2023

Background information
- Born: Alison Lewis; September 18, 1989 (age 37); Melbourne, Victoria, Australia
- Origin: London, England
- Genres: Industrial; dark wave; EBM; techno
- Years active: 2011–present
- Labels: Fleisch Records; Candela Rising; Noiztank; Dark Entries
- Member of: Linea Aspera; Keluar

Alison Lewis, known professionally as Zoè Zanias, is an Australian musician, producer, and DJ based in Berlin. Born in Melbourne, she became one half of the electronic duo Linea Aspera after moving to London. The act were considered to be at the forefront of the minimal wave resurgence before their disbanding in 2013.

After a stint in the short-lived band Keluar and a string of EPs, Zanias released her debut solo album, Into the All (2018). She continued releasing solo material through her label Fleisch Records, which she co-founded in 2016. She has collaborated with a number of acts including the likes of Delerium, The Jesus and Mary Chain, and I Hate Models, and has embarked on a number of world tours.

== Biography ==
Zanias was born in Melbourne, Australia and raised throughout Southeast Asia. She had moved to London to study archeology when she met musician Ryan Ambridge. Together they founded the electronic act Linea Aspera in November 2011. They released their self-titled debut in January 2012 and their first full-length album later that year. The duo had planned to tour North America in late 2012, but had to cancel due to visa issues. Before their breakup in 2013, Linea Aspera had become a major player in the resurgent minimal wave scene, influencing contemporaries such as Boy Harsher.

In 2012, Zanias moved to Berlin and formed the band Keluar with producer Sid Lamar from the techno outfit Schwefelgelb. The band is named after the Indonesian and Malaysian word meaning "to go out" and was meant as a hint to Zanias' upbringing in those countries. Their self-titled debut was released in June 2014 through the label Desire. They released a follow-up EP in 2015 titled Panguna. Her first release as a solo artist was the EP 23.10.14 in 2015.

In September 2016, Zanias released the EP To the Core which featured the song "Follow the Body". The song's music video was directed by Clay Adamczyk and shot in Poland near the Baltic Sea. As of June 2024, the music video has over 1.7 million views on YouTube. At the end of 2018 she released her debut studio album, Into the All, through the label Candela Rising. A year later, she reunited with Ambridge to announce new material for Linea Aspera. Preservation Bias, released in June 2019, featured a number of rare and unused songs from the duo's early years. Their second studio album, LP II, featuring all brand new material, was released the following year.

Zanias released her second album, Unearthed in September 2021 through the label Fleisch Records. Fleisch, which she co-founded in 2016, has released works from artists such as Kontravoid, Multiple Man, and Neu-Romancer. In 2023, Flesich partnered with Metropolis Records to release Zanias' third studio album, Chrysalis. Zanias took inspiration for the album's sound from the lush rainforest habitat of Queensland, Australia, where the album was in part produced. According to Zanias, "each of the album’s eight songs were inspired by a series of unfortunate events" and deal with themes such as Capitalism and isolation. She announced a tour in support for the album with Neu-Romancer's Laura Bailey joining her onstage as a live bassist.

Zanias made her first live collaboration as a guest singer for The Jesus and Mary Chain in 2023 and joined the band again at the Cruel World Festival in Pasadena in 2024. In February that year, she released her fourth album, Ecdysis, composed entirely of instrumental songs. Later that same year she produced a remix for the Delerium single "Remember Love".

== Artistry ==
Zanias has cited artists such as Grimes, Zola Jesus, and Light Asylum as early inspirations for her work as a solo artist. "They were completely on their own on stage and [I was] watching them and thinking, 'well, I don’t need a band. I could just do this'". Other artists she has mentioned as influences on her work include HTRK, Fever Ray, Dead Can Dance, Current 93, Tool, and Coil.

In an interview with Vice, Zanias described how Berlin's expansive electronic music scene had influenced her style: "You listen to all these sounds, and the DJs at Berghain and other clubs in Berlin put in a real effort to play interesting sounds [...] When people put that effort in, you can get really inspired—even by a single really nice snare. It can make you think about how you'd use that sound in a song".

== Personal life ==
In May 2022, Zanias reported on her Instagram that she fell victim to a needle spiking incident at the Berghain nightclub in Berlin. She stated that she lost consciousness and collapsed before being brought backstage by her friends. As she regained consciousness, bouncers removed her and her friends from the premises and refused them reentry. A spokesperson for the Berlin Club Commission stated that they were aware of the situation and agreed that the club did not handle it "in the best way".

== Discography ==
Studio albums

- Into the All (2018)
- Unearthed (2021)
- Chrysalis (2023)
- Ecdysis (2024)
- Cataclysm (2025)

EPs

- 23.10.14 (2015)
- To the Core (2016)
- Harmaline (2020)
- Extinction (2020)
- Shackles (with These Hidden Hands) (2021)

Singles

- "Untethered" (2021)
- "Unraveled" (2021)
- "Unseen" (2021)
- "Simulation" (2023)
- "Metrics" (2023)
- "Burial" (2023)
- "Simulation" (Forces Remix) (2023)
- "Tryptamine Palace" (2023)
- "Simulation" (Clouzer Remix) (2023)
- "Simulation" (Alen Skanner Remix) (2023)
- "Chrysalis" (Metamorphosis) (2024)
- "Lovelife" (Remix) (2024)
- "Burial" (Qual Remix) (2024)

Remix album

- To the Core Remixes (2017)
