= Lumerians =

American psychedelic quartet

- Origin: San Francisco, California, USA
- Genres: Space rock; psychedelic rock; experimental rock; progressive rock; drone; Paisley Underground; electronic
- Years active: 2006–present
- Labels: Knitting Factory Records; Partisan Records; Rococo Records; Hands in the Dark; Permanent Records
- Members: Tyler Green; guitar, keys, synth Marc Melzer; bass, vocals Jason Miller; keyboard, synth, guitar, vocals Chris Musgrave; drums
- Past members: Luis Vasquez; percussion, synth, vocals Tony Peluso; percussion
- Website: knittingfactoryrecords.com/artists/lumerians

Lumerians is a San Francisco Bay Area-based quartet which has a psychedelic "mindbender" space rock sound. The group is notable for performances characterized by "transcendent live video projections" and having "incredible visuals", according to one music critic. One critic described the band as "Oakland's prize pony in the Bay Area gloom-folk horse race". The sound has been compared to Krautrock with overtones of 1960s music.

== History ==
The band was founded by Tyler Green, Marc Melzer, Jason Miller and Chris Musgrave in 2006. Multi-instrumentalist Luis Vasquez joined in 2008. Early rehearsals and recordings were produced in San Francisco, but the group has since relocated to Oakland. They have their own recording studio in a converted church in Oakland, California. The band's sound was influenced by groups such as Sonic Youth, Krautrock groups such as Can and Neu!, and African and South American Psych music from the 1960s and 1970s. In mid-2011 Vasquez left the group to focus on his project The Soft Moon The Lumerians have worked with vocalist Rebecca Coseboom. Coseboom and the Lumerians did the track Separate Half on the EP entitled The Answer EP by Unkle. They performed in 2010 in Brooklyn with the Butthole Surfers. Lumerians released their first full length LP, Transmalinnia in March 2011. In July 2012, Lumerians released their second LP, a collection of instrumental spontaneous compositions titled "Transmissions from Telos Vol. IV." "Transmissions" was released as a limited 300 edition transparent vinyl by French label Hands in the Dark in Europe and an edition of 500 (150 transparent sea blue and 350 Bone) on Permanent Records in the US. In late November and early December 2012, Lumerians completed their first European tour, ending the year with the release of the Horizon Structures EP on Knitting Factory Records. A limited 500 edition vinyl of Horizon Structures is packaged with "4D Transdimensional portal viewing glasses" for viewing the video for "The Bloom," shot in ChromaDepth.

Lumerians released LP The High Frontier in May 2013 in the UK and Europe, supported by performances in UK, France, Netherlands and Belgium. The album was released August 2013 in the US, coinciding with a series of dates supporting My Bloody Valentine on the second half of their US tour, followed by a series of UK and European dates in 2014, culminating with them closing out the Roadburn Festival's Afterburner in Tilburg, Netherlands. Lumerians ended 2014 with the release of Transmissions from Telos Vol. III, in December. In 2015, Lumerians supported Vol. III with select shows across North America, UK, and Europe, including Levitation Chicago, Levitation France and Liverpool Psych Fest.

Lumerians played few live dates in 2016 or 2017, taking time to focus on writing and recording, but closed out the last night of the 2016 Desert Daze festival in Joshua Tree, Calif.

== Psychedelic performances ==
The band received positive critical attention not only for its "psychedelic sound" but for achieving "intense psychedelic projections" using a vast array of synchronized equipment during its public performances. Marc Melzer explained:

Something that we thought about from the beginning was just making the live experience a real happening or event, and trying to, when we go into a space to play, just making that space our own and trying to create a real atmosphere there. – Marc Melzer, in San Francisco Weekly, 2011

A report in SFGate described the band as "masked and draped in monastic cassocks" with performances that were "hypnotic" using "spirarling psych drones", according to music critic Michelle Broder Van Dyke, who elaborated that their "keyboard-driven rhythms" evoked "lost relics, like the mythic underseas continent its band name references." A music reporter described one performance:

The area around the stage was packed with people swaying back and forth on their feet as if hypnotized by the music. The band had a projector set up that contributed to the tripped out atmosphere by displaying floor to ceiling shots of spinning spirals and moving patterns. Their set was tantamount to listening to the soundtrack from an epic science fiction movie about a jungle on another planet. – Carla Selvin in SF Weekly, 2010

When asked in an interview how the group chose their name, Miller said:

We tattooed several Fortean concepts on individual snakes, threw them in the hollowed-out chest cavity of a bull carcass and plunged in our hands. The snake that bit us the most times chose our name. – Jason Miller, 2009

Some music critics have described the music as space rock. When asked whether the group was described as a "space-rock" genre, Melzer elaborated that the group loves 1960s psych bands, revivalism music, and Krautrock but that they were not trying to be one of those types of groups; rather, the aim was to create "trancelike music or ecstatic music" that "takes the listener to another place."

== Knitting Factory records ==
In 2010, the band was approached by Knitting Factory Records after listening to their music on MySpace. Their debut album Transmalinnia was released in 2011 on the Knitting Factory Records label and featured nine tracks. According to Marc Melzer, the band took many years to record their first full-length because they wanted to have a coherent album sound. The cover art of the album Transmalinnia was done by the outsider artist Eugene Von Bruenchenhein. The group released the new song Atlanta Brook in 2011.

== Reviews ==
Reviews have been positive for their albums and live performances.

- Music critic Daniel Levin Becker of San Francisco Weekly wrote that their song Gaussian Castles on the album Transmalinnia was a "hallucination unto itself complete with cavernous room, ominous reverb and far-off galloping drums" and commented that the accompanying video "scans like the unholy lovechild of an iTunes visualization algorithm and a year's worth of footage of the Serengeti compressed into five minutes."
- Critic Ian S. Port in SF Weekly described the band as "stunning Oakland psych-rockers" and described the band as a "force––live especially" and commented that their album Transmalinnia was "entrancing" and "captures some but not all of the obsessive linearity and pounding drive of the band's live show." Port highly recommended Transmallinia in a review in 2011.
- Music critic Carla Selvin in SF Weekly described a live performance in which the bass guitar sound "reverberated so strong it felt like a seizure" and that the beat was "intoxicating" from the Congo drums with an "over-saturated synth-drone" which created a "trance-like lull" on the dance floor.

== Discography ==
Singles:

- "Burning Mirrors/Cheveux Fous" 7", 2010, Rococo Records

EPs:

- "S/T EP", 2008, Subterranean Elephants
- "Horizon Structures", 2012, Knitting Factory Records

LPs

- Transmalinnia, 2011, Knitting Factory Records
- "Transmissions from Telos Vol. IV", 2012, Hands in the Dark (EU), Permanent (US)
- The High Frontier, 2013, Partisan Records
- "Transmissions from Telos Vol. III", 2014, Cardinal Fuzz (EU), Permanent Records (US)
- Call of the Void, 2018, Fuzz Club
