= Perfect (The Smashing Pumpkins song) =

1998 single by the Smashing Pumpkins

- US/UK CD1 cover

Single by the Smashing Pumpkins

from the album Adore
- B-side: "Summer"; "Daphne Descends"
- Released: September 7, 1998
- Genre: Alternative rock; pop rock; synth-pop
- Length: 3:22
- Label: Virgin, Hut
- Songwriter: Billy Corgan
- Producers: Billy Corgan, Flood, Brad Wood

The Smashing Pumpkins singles chronology
"Ava Adore" (1998)	"Perfect" (1998)	"Crestfallen" (1999)

Alternative cover
- UK CD single 2

"Perfect" is a song by American alternative rock band the Smashing Pumpkins. It was released as the second single from their fourth album, Adore (1998), on September 7, 1998. It was the final commercial single from the album, although "Crestfallen" and "To Sheila" were subsequently released as promotional singles.

== Critical reception ==
Upon release, the song received positive reviews. Rolling Stone notes that the song "picks up on the synth-pop echoes of the 1996 Pumpkins hit 1979." Feldman of website Musiccritic.com called the single "an irresistible slice of candy-coated pop" while website Rockmusicreview.com praised it for its "glimmering shine."

== Music video ==
To expand on the similarities between "Perfect" and "1979", the band released a music video that continued the story of the characters in "1979". They were able to find and use four out of the five original actors from the "1979" video, including Giuseppe Andrews. The fifth was in jail. The same directors were hired, husband-and-wife team Jonathan Dayton and Valerie Faris. It was the fifth and final collaboration between them and the Smashing Pumpkins.

The conclusion of the video, in which a cassette tape left on the roof of a car falls off and is crushed by a following vehicle, is probably a reference to the fate of the first tapes of the "1979" music video, which had to be re-taped because they were left on the roof of a car and destroyed when the car drove off.

The video also contains footage of the band performing at The Masque in L.A. for selected fans. The set played at the taping included heavier songs the band was not performing during regular concerts at the time, such as "Where Boys Fear to Tread", "Bodies", and "Pug".

The video debuted on MTV's 120 Minutes on September 16, 1998.

Interspersed within the video is footage of Billy Corgan performing the song while perched on a construction crane.

== Track listings ==
All songs were written by Billy Corgan, except "Summer", written by James Iha. Drums provided by Joey Waronker.

UK CD1
No.	Title	Length
1.	"Perfect"	3:27
2.	"Summer"	3:14
3.	"Perfect" (Nellee Hooper Mix)	4:14

UK CD2
No.	Title	Length
1.	"Perfect"	3:23
2.	"Perfect" (Perfecto Mix)	7:00
3.	"Daphne Descends" (Kerry B. Mix)	3:53

UK and US Maxi-CDs
No.	Title	Length
1.	"Album Version"	3:23
2.	"Nellee Hooper Mix"	4:14
3.	"Nellee Hooper Instrumental"	4:12
4.	"Perfecto Mix"	7:00
5.	"Electro Breakbeat Mix"	6:02
6.	"Perfecto Dub"	7:04

US CD single
No.	Title	Length
1.	"Perfect"	3:23
2.	"Summer"	3:14
3.	"Daphne Descends" (Kerry B. Mix)	3:53

== Charts ==
=== Weekly charts ===
Chart (1998)	Peak position
Australia (ARIA)	56
Canada Singles Sales (The Record)	13
Canada Contempory Hit Radio (The Record)	33
Canada Top Singles (RPM)	11
Canada Dance/Urban (RPM) Remix	19
Canada Rock/Alternative (RPM)	2
Europe (Eurochart Hot 100)	82
Iceland (Íslenski Listinn Topp 40)	17
New Zealand (Recorded Music NZ)	18
Scottish Singles Sales (Official Charts)	21
UK Singles (Official Charts)	24
US Billboard Hot 100	54
US Adult Alternative Airplay (Billboard)	8
US Adult Pop Airplay (Billboard)	31
US Alternative Airplay (Billboard)	3
US Mainstream Rock Airplay (Billboard)	33

=== Year-end charts ===
Chart (1998)	Position
Canada Top Singles (RPM)	78
Canada Rock/Alternative (RPM)	20
US Adult Top 40 (Billboard)	93
US Modern Rock Tracks (Billboard)	19
US Triple-A (Billboard)	44

== Release history ==
Region	Date	Format(s)	Label(s)	Ref.
United States	July 28, 1998	Contemporary hit radio	Virgin	
United Kingdom	September 7, 1998	CD	Virgin; Hut	
United States	October 6, 1998	CD	Virgin	
Japan	October 28, 1998	CD	Virgin	
