= Ava Adore =

1998 single by the Smashing Pumpkins

Single by the Smashing Pumpkins

from the album Adore
- B-side: "Czarina"; "Once in a While"
- Released: May 18, 1998
- Genre: Electronic rock; alternative rock; synth-pop
- Length: 4:21
- Label: Virgin; Hut
- Songwriter: Billy Corgan
- Producer: Brad Wood

The Smashing Pumpkins singles chronology
"The End Is the Beginning Is the End" (1997)	"Ava Adore" (1998)	"Perfect" (1998)

Music video
- "Ava Adore" on YouTube

"Ava Adore" is a song by American alternative rock band the Smashing Pumpkins. It was the first single from their fourth album, Adore, and exhibited a new sound from the band that integrated traditional instruments with loops and electronic music. "Ava Adore" and the B-sides were written by Billy Corgan.

When released as a single in May 1998, "Ava Adore" reached number one in Iceland, number two in Greece, number five in New Zealand, and the top 20 in Australia, Canada, Hungary, Ireland, Norway, Sweden, and the United Kingdom. In the United States, it reached number 42 on the Billboard Hot 100, number three on the Modern Rock Tracks chart, and number eight on the Mainstream Rock chart.

== Music video ==
The music video was released on June 1, 1998, and was directed by Dom and Nic, featuring the band in gothic-inspired clothing and walking through a variety of scenes. The video, filmed in one long take, is notable for its use of slow and fast motion while the speed of the camera is apparently static, and the band continues to lip sync to the song in perfect rhythm. The calculations required to work out the speed changes caused massive delays on set, causing the band to nearly call off the entire plan. The sets seen in the video were arranged in a configuration resembling a hallway, in which a rave sequence functioned as the end of the hall. Instead of continuing to the right, the camera rotates to the left, revealing the artifice of the visuals.

The music video won an award for "most stylish video" at the 1998 VH1 Fashion Awards.

In July 2025, Corgan revealed that the music video cost them US$800,000 and there was one scene when the camera operator accidentally swung the camera to face the crew and train track (at 2:34), breaking the fourth wall. When Corgan saw the rough cut, he said to leave it as it was his favorite part of the music video, much to the chagrin of the director.

== Track listings ==
All tracks are written by Billy Corgan.

No.	Title	Length
1.	"Ava Adore"	4:22
2.	"Czarina"	4:43
3.	"Once in a While"	3:33

UK limited-edition numbered 7-inch single
No.	Title	Length
1.	"Ava Adore"	4:22
2.	"Czarina"	4:43

== Charts ==
=== Weekly charts ===
Chart (1998)	Peak position
Australia (ARIA)	19
Canada Singles Sales (The Record)	9
Canada Top Singles (RPM)	16
Canada Rock/Alternative (RPM)	2
Europe (Eurochart Hot 100)	42
Finland (Suomen virallinen lista)	4
Germany (GfK)	91
Greece (IFPI Greece)	2
Hungary (Mahasz)	10
Iceland (Íslenski Listinn Topp 40)	1
Ireland (IRMA)	15
Netherlands (Dutch Top 40 Tipparade)	16
Netherlands (Single Top 100)	77
New Zealand (Recorded Music NZ)	5
Norway (VG-lista)	11
Scottish Singles Sales (Official Charts)	11
Sweden (Sverigetopplistan)	19
UK Singles (Official Charts)	11
US Billboard Hot 100	42
US Alternative Airplay (Billboard)	3
US Mainstream Rock Airplay (Billboard)	8

=== Year-end charts ===
Chart (1998)	Position
Canada Rock/Alternative (RPM)	8
Iceland (Íslenski Listinn Topp 40)	18
US Mainstream Rock Tracks (Billboard)	47
US Modern Rock Tracks (Billboard)	26

== Release history ==
Region	Date	Format(s)	Label(s)	Ref(s).
United States	May 11, 1998	Active rock radio	Virgin	
United Kingdom	May 18, 1998	7-inch vinyl; CD; cassette	Virgin; Hut	
Japan	June 6, 1998	CD	Virgin	
United States	June 16, 1998	CD; cassette	Virgin	

== Covers ==
Urban Heat covered the song for 2026's Sending Hearts To All My Dearies: A Tribute To The Smashing Pumpkins.
