= The Soft Moon (album) =

Studio album by The Soft Moon
- Released: November 16, 2010
- Genre: Post-punk
- Length: 37:48
- Label: Captured Tracks

The Soft Moon chronology
The Soft Moon (2010)	Total Decay (2011)

Professional ratings
Review scores
Source	Rating
AllMusic	3.5/5 stars
Pitchfork	8.1

The Soft Moon is the debut studio album by American post-punk band the Soft Moon. It was released on November 16, 2010 by Captured Tracks. The album was recorded over the span of a year in frontman Luis Vasquez's apartment. Writing, composition, recording, production and album art are credited to Vasquez. Vasquez commented on the album in an interview with Fact: "The first LP was more spontaneous and less focused mainly because the songs were never intended to reach the public’s ears. Each song was just a different way to reach inside myself and pull out memories from the past." The album was well received upon its release.

== Track listing ==
No.	Title	Length
1.	"Breathe the Fire"	3:14
2.	"Circles"	4:02
3.	"Out of Time"	3:52
4.	"When It's Over"	4:26
5.	"Dead Love"	4:04
6.	"Parallels"	3:09
7.	"We Are We"	2:30
8.	"Sewer Sickness"	2:33
9.	"Into the Depths"	3:27
10.	"Primal Eyes"	2:41
11.	"Tiny Spiders"	3:50
Total length:		37:48
