= Deeper (The Soft Moon album) =

Studio album by the Soft Moon
- Released: March 31, 2015
- Recorded: Venice, Italy; Berlin, Germany
- Genre: Dark wave
- Length: 43:04
- Label: Captured Tracks
- Producers: Luis Vasquez; Maurizio Baggio

The Soft Moon chronology
Zeros (2012)	Deeper (2015)	Criminal (2018)

Deeper is the third full-length studio album by American post-punk band the Soft Moon. It was released on March 31, 2015 by Captured Tracks.

First single "Black" was featured as a Best New Track by Pitchfork, and was used in the television series Gotham and How to Get Away With Murder. Million Dollar Extreme's Adult Swim television series also used "Try" as the ending song to the episode "Illegal Broadcast: John Hell Emergency". In 2024, "Black" was used in an Apple Watch commercial.

== Critical reception ==
Professional ratings
Aggregate scores
Source	Rating
Metacritic	74/100
Review scores
Source	Rating
AllMusic	4/5 stars
Exclaim!	8/10
NPR	favorable
Pitchfork	7.8/10
The Quietus	favorable

Lisa Sookraj of Exclaim! called the record a more polished release that is "fuller, fatter and puts more emphasis on its futuristic electronic elements than its nostalgic ones." The Skinny's Simon Catling drew comparisons to OMD, Throbbing Gristle and Cabaret Voltaire, stating, "Although this is certainly a tasteful pallette to magpie from, nothing on Deeper suggests that [Luis] Vasquez is doing any more than wallowing in these easily overpowering tropes."

== Track listing ==
No.	Title	Length
1.	"Inward"	0:40
2.	"Black"	3:28
3.	"Far"	3:56
4.	"Wasting"	5:50
5.	"Wrong"	3:18
6.	"Try"	3:53
7.	"Desertion"	3:55
8.	"Without"	3:23
9.	"Feel"	3:48
10.	"Deeper"	4:39
11.	"Being"	6:16

== Personnel ==
Adapted from CD liner notes and AllMusic.

- Maurizio Baggio – production, mixing, mastering (at Hate Studio, Vicenza, Italy), co-writer for "Wrong"
- Luis Vasquez – composition, performance, production, audio engineer
