= Exister (album) =

Studio album by The Soft Moon
- Released: September 23, 2022
- Genre: Post-punk, darkwave
- Length: 36:45
- Label: Sacred Bones

The Soft Moon chronology
Criminal (2018)	Exister (2022)

Singles from Exister
- 1. "Him" Released: June 14, 2022

Professional ratings
Aggregate scores
Source	Rating
Metacritic	79/100
Review scores
Source	Rating
AllMusic	4/5 stars
BPM	65%
Loud and Quiet	5/10
Pitchfork	7.4/10
Slant Magazine	4/5 stars

Exister is the fifth and final studio album by American post-punk band The Soft Moon. It was released on September 23, 2022, by Sacred Bones Records, and was the band's last release of new music before frontman Luis Vasquez' death in 2024.

== Background ==
On June 14, 2022, The Soft Moon announced the release of their fifth studio album, along with the first single "Him", which features rapper Fish Narc.

== Critical reception ==
Exister was met with "generally favorable" reviews from critics. At Metacritic, which assigns a weighted average rating out of 100 to reviews from mainstream publications, this release received an average score of 79, based on 5 reviews.

At Slant Magazine, critic writer Fred Barrett wrote: "Like 2018's Criminal, the album represents another step forward for the Soft Moon, as Vasquez processes his pain with a newfound level of honesty, and an uncanny ability to build on the well-established musical ideas he so enthusiastically draws from."

== Tour ==
In support of the album, The Soft Moon announced they were going on tour, starting on September 26, 2022, in Hamburg, Germany at the Uebel & Gefährlich venue, and finishing on December 11, 2022, in Boston, Massachusetts at The Sinclair.

== Track listing ==
Exister track listing
No.	Title	Length
1.	"Sad Song"	3:16
2.	"Answers"	3:06
3.	"Become the Lies"	4:29
4.	"Face Is Gone"	3:07
5.	"Monster"	3:24
6.	"The Pit"	3:32
7.	"NADA"	4:14
8.	"Stupid Child"	1:28
9.	"Him" (featuring Fish Narc)	3:27
10.	"Unforgiven" (featuring Alli Logout)	3:04
11.	"Exister"	3:38
