= Total Decay =

EP by The Soft Moon
- Released: November 7, 2011
- Genre: Post-punk
- Length: 14:31
- Label: Captured Tracks

The Soft Moon chronology
The Soft Moon (2010)	Total Decay (2011)	Zeros (2012)

Professional ratings
Review scores
Source	Rating
AllMusic	3.5/5 stars
Pitchfork	7.8

Total Decay is an EP from American post-punk band the Soft Moon. It was released on November 7, 2011 by Captured Tracks. In an interview with The Bay Bridged, frontman Luis Vasquez characterized the EP as sonically "more radical in terms of expression and versatility" than the group's prior record. Speaking with Fact, Vasquez explained: "Total Decay was a chance for me to write something more radical and express some versatility without the pressure that comes with writing a full-length". As of 2018 the EP holds a score of 74 on the aggregate review site Metacritic, indicating "generally favorable reviews" by music critics.

== Track listing ==
All tracks are written by the Soft Moon.

No.	Title	Length
1.	"Repetition"	2:40
2.	"Alive"	4:13
3.	"Total Decay"	4:16
4.	"Visions"	3:22
Total length:		14:31
