= Cruel World Festival =

Annual music festival in Pasadena, California

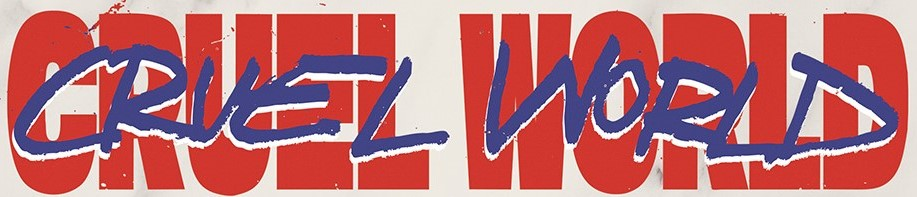
- Genre: New wave, gothic rock, post-punk, alternative rock
- Dates: May
- Locations: Brookside at the Rose Bowl (Pasadena, California, U.S.)
- Coordinates: 34.165°N 118.167°W
- Years active: 2022–present
- Organizer: Goldenvoice
- Website: cruelworldfest.com

The Cruel World Festival is an annual music festival held at the Brookside at the Rose Bowl in Pasadena, California. It was founded in 2020, and is organized by Goldenvoice, a subsidiary of AEG Presents. The festival revolves around the new wave, post-punk, gothic rock and alternative rock genres. In the park, several stages continuously host live music.

Cruel World Festival showcases popular and established musical artists as well as reunited groups. The first edition on May 14 and 15, 2022, featured Morrissey, Bauhaus and Blondie among more than 25 artists. A second edition of the festival took place on May 20, 2023, featuring Siouxsie and Iggy Pop as headliners with a run of 20 other artists including Billy Idol, the Human League, Love and Rockets and Echo & the Bunnymen. The 2023 edition was ended early in the night due to nearby lightning strikes. Siouxsie's headlining set that evening was rescheduled for the following day, with Iggy Pop and Gary Numan also returning. Duran Duran headlined the third festival on May 11, 2024. The fourth edition took place on May 17, 2025, headlined by New Order and Nick Cave and the Bad Seeds.

== History ==
=== 2022 ===
On February 11, 2020, Goldenvoice announced the inaugural Cruel World Festival set to take place on May 2 at the Dignity Health Sports Park grounds in Carson, California, outside of Los Angeles. The festival was first postponed to September due to the worldwide pandemic, then canceled entirely in May. In June 2021, Goldenvoice announced that the inaugural festival would finally take place on May 14, 2022, with minor lineup alterations and a new site at the Brookside Golf Course at the Rose Bowl in Pasadena, California.

The inaugural edition featured more than 25 bands, with headlining sets by Morrissey, Bauhaus and Blondie and appearances by Devo, the Psychedelic Furs, the Church and others. The festival was a way to "revive the '80s", with "some of the biggest names" from the 1980s new wave and gothic rock scenes. As tickets sold out for the first day, a second day with the same line-up was added for Sunday, May 15. Los Angeles Times wrote: "Cruel World time-travels back to that moment when synthesizers were supplanting guitars and rebel teens born into baby boomer hegemony were hungrily seeking new sounds, ideas and hairdos".

=== 2023 ===
In January 2023, the second edition of Cruel World Fest was announced for Saturday, May 20, 2023, to take place at the same location, with tickets going on sale on Friday, January 27. Siouxsie and Iggy Pop were announced as headliners, joined by Billy Idol, the Human League, Love and Rockets, Echo & the Bunnymen, Gary Numan, Gang of Four and many others. It was Siouxsie's first United States performance in 15 years and her only confirmed U.S. performance of the year. It was also the first Love and Rockets set in 15 years (with Bauhaus having broken up between festivals) and Daniel Ash stated that it would be the beginning of the final ever Love and Rockets tour. Near the end of the night, during Pop's performance and before Siouxsie's scheduled set, the festival was ended abruptly by authorities, due to "extremely severe weather conditions" that included lightning strikes. Early in the morning of May 21, the promoters of the festival announced on social media that Siouxsie and Pop would return later that day, "with Siouxsie performing an extended set." Sunday also featured Numan returning for another performance, as well as a set from Club Doom Dave.

=== 2024 ===
The third edition of Cruel World took place on May 11, 2024, headlined by Duran Duran and featuring sets by Blondie, Interpol, Adam Ant, Simple Minds and others. Gary Numan returned to the festival to perform his 1979 album The Pleasure Principle in its entirety. Ministry performed a set consisting of songs from their first two albums, With Sympathy (1983) and Twitch (1986), including many songs not performed since the 1980s. Tones on Tail performed their first official set since 1984. The Alarm and Balvanera cancelled their appearances, the former due to frontman Mike Peters' cancer diagnosis.

=== 2025 ===
The fourth edition took place on May 17, 2025, featuring headliners New Order and Nick Cave and the Bad Seeds, as well as sets by 'Til Tuesday, Garbage, the Go-Go's, Alison Moyet, Devo, Madness and others. The performance by Nick Cave and the Bad Seeds was the culmination of their first North American tour in seven years. Similarly, the performance by the Go-Go's marked the end of their limited six-date 2025 tour, their first in eight years with all five original members.

The festival saw the first performance by 'Til Tuesday in 33 years, and their first with the original lineup in 35 years. It also marked the first North American performance by Blancmange in almost 40 years. Ian Astbury and Billy Duffy of the Cult performed a one-time only reunion set as their darker, earlier incarnation, Death Cult.

This edition of the festival was plagued by several hours of rain, although it did not impact the headlining sets by New Order and Nick Cave and the Bad Seeds.

== Lineups ==
Date	Performers	Notes
May 14 and 15, 2022	"Outsiders" stage: Morrissey, Bauhaus, Devo, The Church, Public Image Ltd, TR/ST, London After Midnight, Sextile, Automatic, The KVB "Sad Girls" stage: Blondie, The Psychedelic Furs, Violent Femmes, The Damned, Blaqk Audio, Cold Cave, English Beat, Black Marble, Soft Kill "Lost Boys" stage: Berlin, Jay Aston's Gene Loves Jezebel, Drab Majesty, Missing Persons, 45 Grave, Christian Death, The Meteors	Echo & the Bunnymen were initially scheduled to perform but had to cancel, due to travel visa delays.
May 20, 2023	"Outsiders" stage: Siouxsie, Iggy Pop, Love and Rockets, Echo & the Bunnymen, Gary Numan, Molchat Doma, Modern English, Twin Tribes, Ela Minus, Glass Spells, Gvllow, Aurat "Sad Girls" stage: Billy Idol, Squeeze, Gang of Four, The Vapors, Animotion, Riki "Lost Boys" stage: The Human League, Boy Harsher, ABC, The Soft Moon, Berlin, Urban Heat, Wax Trax! Records	Adam Ant and the Motels cancelled and were replaced by Squeeze and Berlin, respectively. Lightning alerts ended the sets of Iggy Pop and the Human League prematurely, meaning Siouxsie was unable to perform as scheduled. Siouxsie and Pop, along with Numan, returned the following day for a second show.
May 11, 2024	"Outsiders" stage: Duran Duran, Blondie, Soft Cell, Adam Ant, Dreamcar, Ministry, Gary Numan, The Faint, General Public, French Police, Model/Actriz, Adult., Leathers, Zanias "Sad Girls" stage: Tones on Tail, Interpol, Simple Minds, The Jesus & Mary Chain, Lol Tolhurst with Budgie, The Mission UK, Nuovo Testamento, Patriarchy, Wendy Bevan "Lost Boys" stage: Placebo, TR/ST, Heaven 17, The Stranglers, The Motels, Harsh Symmetry, Body of Light	The Alarm and Balvanera were removed from the lineup in early May 2024. Wendy Bevan was added.
May 17, 2025	"Outsiders" stage: New Order, Nick Cave and the Bad Seeds, Garbage, Madness, OMD, 'Til Tuesday, Alison Moyet, Blancmange, Midge Ure, Light Asylum, Actors, Kite, Social Order "Sad Girls" stage: The Go-Go's, Devo, She Wants Revenge, Buzzcocks, Mareux, She Past Away, Depressión Sonora, Deceits "Lost Boys" stage: Death Cult, Clan of Xymox, Chelsea Wolfe, Stereo MC's, Nation of Language, Provoker, N8noface, Wisteria	
