= Careful (Boy Harsher album) =

Studio album by Boy Harsher
- Released: February 1, 2019
- Genre: Synth-pop; electropop; minimal wave; coldwave; EBM
- Length: 43:01
- Label: Nude Club
- Producer: Boy Harsher; Jordan Romero

Boy Harsher chronology
Yr Body Is Nothing (2016)	Careful (2019)	Careful Remixes, etc. (2019)

Singles from Careful
- 1. "Face the Fire" Released: October 30, 2018; 2. "Fate" Released: December 11, 2018; 3. "LA" Released: January 22, 2019; 4. "Tears" Released: 2019; 5. "Come Closer" Released: 2019

Careful is the second studio album by the American electronic music group Boy Harsher. It was released on February 1, 2019, through the band's own imprint, Nude Club.

The first single from the record, "Face the Fire", was released on October 30, 2018, with an accompanying music video. Music videos for the other singles, "Fate" and "LA" were released in December 2018 and January 2019, respectively. A remix album titled Careful Remixes, Etc. was released in the same year.

== Music and lyrics ==
The music on Careful has been described as minimal wave, synth-pop, darkwave and coldwave. The 405's Francisco Gonçalves Silva considered the album as a "rejuvenation of 80s EBM with cinematic textures," while Resident Advisor's Matt McDermott labeled it as "a mix of compact synth pop tunes and filmic interludes." Jordan Bassett of NME characterized the record's sound as "minimalistic dance music that embraces the darkest corners of the genre, cloaking itself in the shadow elements of coldwave and techno," while noting the "80s-influenced sound". The album was also noted by its lo-fi production, which "evoke images of icy, dank studios and videos by German industrialists KMFDM."

The introspective lyrical subjects of Careful were heavily inspired by vocalist and lyricist Jae Matthews's personal losses and family struggles. The track "Jerry" is about Matthews's step-father, who died during the writing sessions for Careful and before her mother's dementia diagnosis.

== Title ==
The title of the record originates from the band's brief break up in 2017. Jae Matthews and Augustus Muller decided to end their professional and romantic relationship and at their final show, Matthews got a tattoo of the word "careful". The duo reconciled following the show. According to Matthews, the title "relates to a similar feeling of being protective of your heart."

== Critical reception ==
Professional ratings
Aggregate scores
Source	Rating
Metacritic	81/100
Review scores
Source	Rating
The 405	8/10
The Line of Best Fit	7/10
NME	4/5 stars
Pitchfork	7.2/10
Resident Advisor	3.8/5
The Skinny	3/5 stars
Tiny Mix Tapes	4/5 stars

At Metacritic, which assigns a normalized rating out of 100 to reviews from mainstream publications, Careful received an average score of 81, based on 9 reviews, indicating "universal acclaim". Writing for The 405, Francisco Gonçalves Silva has stated: "With Careful, they are no longer the best-kept secret among the dingier crowds, but their music, passion and on-going commitment have placed them close to a league of their own, hopefully lasting throughout the years to come." Chris Todd of The Line of Best Fit thought that "overall, this record leaves quite the impression; if uneasy listening is your thing, Boy Harsher's murky interpretation of dead disco will envelop you in its dark delights." NME critic Jordan Bassett noted that the band is "at their grungiest and most claustrophobic" on Careful, further writing that "these 10 tracks contain a dark power, an atavistic pull."

Pitchfork's Kevin Lozano remarked that "while the palette of sounds Boy Harsher plays with on Careful can seem limited—brisk drum machine loops, oscillating synths, and Matthews' haunting incantations—the group finds ways to make each song sound distinct." Matt McDermott of Resident Advisor wrote: "At their best, Boy Harsher capture the bittersweet feeling of being young, in love and on the road, oblivious to the inevitable spin-out." Reviewing for Tiny Mix Tapes, Rowan Savage stated: "The handful of atmospheric pieces on Careful don't necessarily contribute but do nod to the filmic quality of Boy Harsher's work." Savage further added: "But where the adjective "cinematic" is usually an upsell these days of "boring", Boy Harsher have a gift at conjuring visceral emotions with subtlety." The Skinny's Michael Lawson has stated: "Matthews and Miller have identified the sweet spot between raw emotion and dancefloor hedonism – an alcove they seem unwilling to vacate anytime soon."

== Track listing ==
Careful track listing as adapted from Bandcamp. All tracks are written by Jae Matthews and Augustus Muller.

No.	Title	Length
1.	"Keep Driving"	3:31
2.	"Face the Fire"	5:33
3.	"Fate"	4:17
4.	"LA"	5:35
5.	"Come Closer"	4:38
6.	"The Look You Gave (Jerry)"	4:56
7.	"Tears"	4:57
8.	"Crush"	3:19
9.	"Lost"	4:29
10.	"Careful"	1:46
Total length:		43:01

== Personnel ==
Album personnel as adapted from liner notes.

- Jae Matthews — performer, lyrics, recordings, cover
- Augustus Muller — performer, lyrics, cover, layout
- Jordan Romero — additional recordings, additional producer
- Maurizio Baggio — mixing
- Gianni Peri — mastering
- Angel Emmanuel — styling
- Myyako Bellizzi — styling
- Tashi Honnery — make-up

== Charts ==
Chart (2019)	Peak position
U.S. Billboard Heatseekers Albums	5
U.S. Billboard Independent Albums	13
