= The High Frontier (album) =

Studio album by Lumerians
- Released: August 6, 2013
- Genre: Psychedelic rock
- Label: Partisan

Lumerians chronology
Transmallinia (2011)	The High Frontier (2013)

Professional ratings
Aggregate scores
Source	Rating
Metacritic	68/100
Review scores
Source	Rating
Consequence of Sound	3/5 stars

The High Frontier is the second studio album by American rock band Lumerians. It was released in August 2013 under Partisan Records.

== Track listing ==
No.	Title	Length
1.	"Dogon Genesis"	5:54
2.	"High Frontier"	5:00
3.	"The Bloom"	5:35
4.	"Koman Tong"	3:30
5.	"Smokies Tangle"	7:24
6.	"Life Without Skin"	6:02
7.	"Abudhabijhab"	6:56
