= High Frontier (board game) =

Science fiction board game

- Designers: Phil Eklund
- Illustrators: Phil Eklund; Antonio Pinar; Nick Stevens; Anna H Lindberg; Josefin Strand
- Publishers: Sierra Madre Games; One Small Step; ION Game Design
- Publication: Lords of the High Frontier (1999); High Frontier (2010); High Frontier Third Edition (2017); High Frontier 4 All (2020)
- Genres: Science fiction; Economic simulation
- Players: 1–6
- Playing time: 120–420 minutes

High Frontier is a science fiction board game series about space exploration, designed by Phil Eklund and originally published through his company Sierra Madre Games. There are four editions: Rocket Flight, High Frontier, High Frontier Third Edition, and High Frontier 4 All. Players embody private or government space agencies striving to explore the solar system and exploit resources beyond Earth. The series is known for accuracy of the rocket physics implemented in order to simulate spaceship movement on a planetary map.

== Publishing history ==
Phil Eklund, an aerospace engineer and game designer, credits his inspiration for the first version of High Frontier, entitled Rocket Flight, to reading Gerard K. O'Neill's book The High Frontier and joining the L5 Society in 1978. This original game consisted of a dozen typewritten copies that included a hexagonal Delta-v grid map on which the rocket's location, altitude and vector would be tracked using a grease pencil, and players would act as futuristic spacefaring companies trading and researching technology in different productive areas. Ecklund created Sierra Madre Games in 1992 and released a new version of Rocket Flight in 1999, entitled Lords of the High Frontier, as part of Phil Eklund's Lords game series.

In 2008, publishing company Ad Astra Games presented the first version of an improved ruleset for Rocket Flight, under the title High Trader. According to the publisher, there were many problems during its development and the project stagnated after three versions of the game had failed to materialize into a functional design. By the time designer Eric Finley had produced a playable version, the project stalled again and was ultimately abandoned in 2010 upon the release of High Frontier.

High Frontier was released by Sierra Madre Games in 2010. A Kickstarter campaign for the third edition of High Frontier raised nearly $160,000, exceeding its $14,000 goal. The game was delivered two years later by One Small Step (OSS), but suffered from a number of production issues. In May 2017, Phil Eklund terminated his contract with OSS on basis of his being disaffected from the development process after submitting the original game files. In August 2018, in a reply to a question on BoardGameGeek, Eklund reported that he had sold Sierra Madre Games to Swedish publisher ION Game Design as a means of getting out of his company's tax debt. The company launched a Kickstarter for the fourth edition, High Frontier 4 All, in October 2019, which raised $363,745 towards funding the project. The game was published in 2021 by ION Game Design.

== Gameplay ==
=== High Frontier ===
This is the first reimplementation of the game, released in a cardboard box which contained cards, tokens, plastic miniatures and a mounted board. This was also the first appearance of the game's iconic map. In it, the hexagonal grid has been replaced by a series of interconnected points representing energy states, on a full-color background.

The map in the base game featured only the areas of Sol, Mercury, Venus, Earth, Mars and the asteroid belt. A board extension was published that same year to include Jupiter and Saturn. It also featured two additional diagrams: one to track solar cycles and one for managing space politics.

=== High Frontier Third Edition ===
It includes two mounted boards: one is the original map, updated and aesthetically improved, the other is the map for Interstellar, a solitaire expansion that already existed in the previous edition but for which there were no physical components. By flipping and joining both boards, a double-size game map can be formed.

The game box also included four books–the training guide, the complete edition rulebook, rules for the expansion, and a reference guide–with totalling 184 pages between them.

=== High Frontier 4 All ===
High Frontier 4 All proposes a progressive way to teaching the rules and flatten the learning curve imposed by such a complex game. The core game box includes several booklets - a Read Me First guide, followed by:

Space Diamonds (8 pages): a "lightweight, family-friendly race through the solar system" that helps the players get used to travelling and learning the map.

Race for Glory (28 pages): the equivalent to the Base Game in third edition, it provides a simplified set of rules - like patent cards with merged supports, seasons or events not affecting gameplay and a somewhat more streamlined movement on the map - for a number of pre-defined scenarios.

Core Rules (56 pages): contains all the rules needed to play the Advanced Game, including a module for politics but excluding the rules introduced by third edition's Colonization.

Appendix (40 pages): includes several game variants and scenarios, and an explanation of the technologies depicted on every patent card in the base game.

In High Frontier 4 All, game modules from previous editions have been split from the base game and released as expansions - thus allowing for a better and more in-depth rules coverage - and new modules have been designed.

List of published and planned expansion modules:

Module 1 Terawatt & Futures (2020): includes Freighters, isotope-fuelled Gigawatt and Terawatt thrusters, and Futures.

Module 2 Colonization (2020): includes Bernals and Colonists.

Module 3 Conflict (2021): introduces a new Political Assembly board and rules for Combat, War and Anarchy.

Module 4 Exodus (2023): first newly designed module in the series, introduces Contracts, space-born Colonists, cybernetic implants, an isotope bank and Exodus - a spaceship with interstellar capabilities.

Module 5 Economy (in development): enriches the game with a corporate finance and stock market setting.

=== Additional content ===
ION has released a few extras for the game, such as a tool pack (Tools 1) in 2024 that includes, amongst others, a Jump Start variant allowing players to start the game with a functional rocket, an asteroid-based factory and a Home Bernal.

In promotional pack The Station - a cross-over with Phil's son Matt Eklund's own design Stationfall - an orbiting space station is placed on Earth's cycler that houses Project X, a high-risk, secretive research program. If the station is at any time destroyed as a result of impacts from floating debris in LEO, the project is released and the game is permanently affected by the negative consequences of this event.

There is also a neoprene mat version of the game board, that increases the size of the original game board from 60x90cm (23"5/8x35"7/16) to 90x135cm (35"7/16x35"5/32).

=== Bios game series ===
High Frontier 4 All can also be played as part of a grand campaign called Bios:Earth. The campaign involves a number of game designs by Phil Eklund and simulates the evolution of life on Earth from the time of the first microorganisms - ca. 3.5 billion years ago - to the age of interstellar travel - 22nd century and beyond - at which point humans have departed a troubled solar system in search of a new home.

After each play, some aspects of the final state of a finished game may be passed onto the next game as starting conditions. This may contribute to a certain degree of asymmetry between players during game setup, but most importantly, it provides them with a sense of continuity and long-term achievement as they play each game.

In this setting, the prequel for the events in High Frontier is Phil Eklund's Bios: Origins (2nd Edition). Origins covers 200,000 years of history, during which different human species - such a Neanderthals and Hobbits - compete to settle, domesticate, develop technologies and shape the political legacy that will be recaptured by the different lobbies and factions in High Frontier.

High Frontier 4 All subsequently focuses on the exploration of the solar system from year 2020 to 2124, with the goal of establishing colonies and industries beyond Earth's orbit and eventually plan an ad astra mission to bring humans to the stars.

Building on this exploit, the sequel, Interstellar, follows the pilgrimage of a scanty crew of human cyborgs to star systems beyond Sol, in order to find a habitable planet and preserve human biological and ideological legacies.

== Reception ==
Leevi Rantala, writing for Lautapeliopas, found that High Frontier offers a realistic portrayal of space travel, making the effort of reading the dense and slightly confusing rule-book worth it. In an article for New Scientist, Dino Motti described High Frontier as a game "for those unafraid of calculations and complex plans." BBC Sky at Night included High Frontier 4 All in their list of the best space board games of 2025 with Ezzy Pearson describing it as "one of the most beautifully complicated boards in gaming." James Whitbrook, in an article for Gizmodo, said that "Space is beautiful. It’s also so incomprehensibly vast and full of the unknown that trying to contemplate that beauty can be frightening and intimidating in equal measure. High Frontier’s massive board redesign in its recent third edition captures that strange mix of feelings perfectly, depicting its ginormous complex playing field of the galaxy atop a backdrop of warm tones."

In an article published on Medium, author Andrew Burbine applied graph theory to model High Frontier's map as a nodal network and visually represent the shortest paths between all sites in the inner solar system.
