= Linea Aspera (band) =

English electronic duo

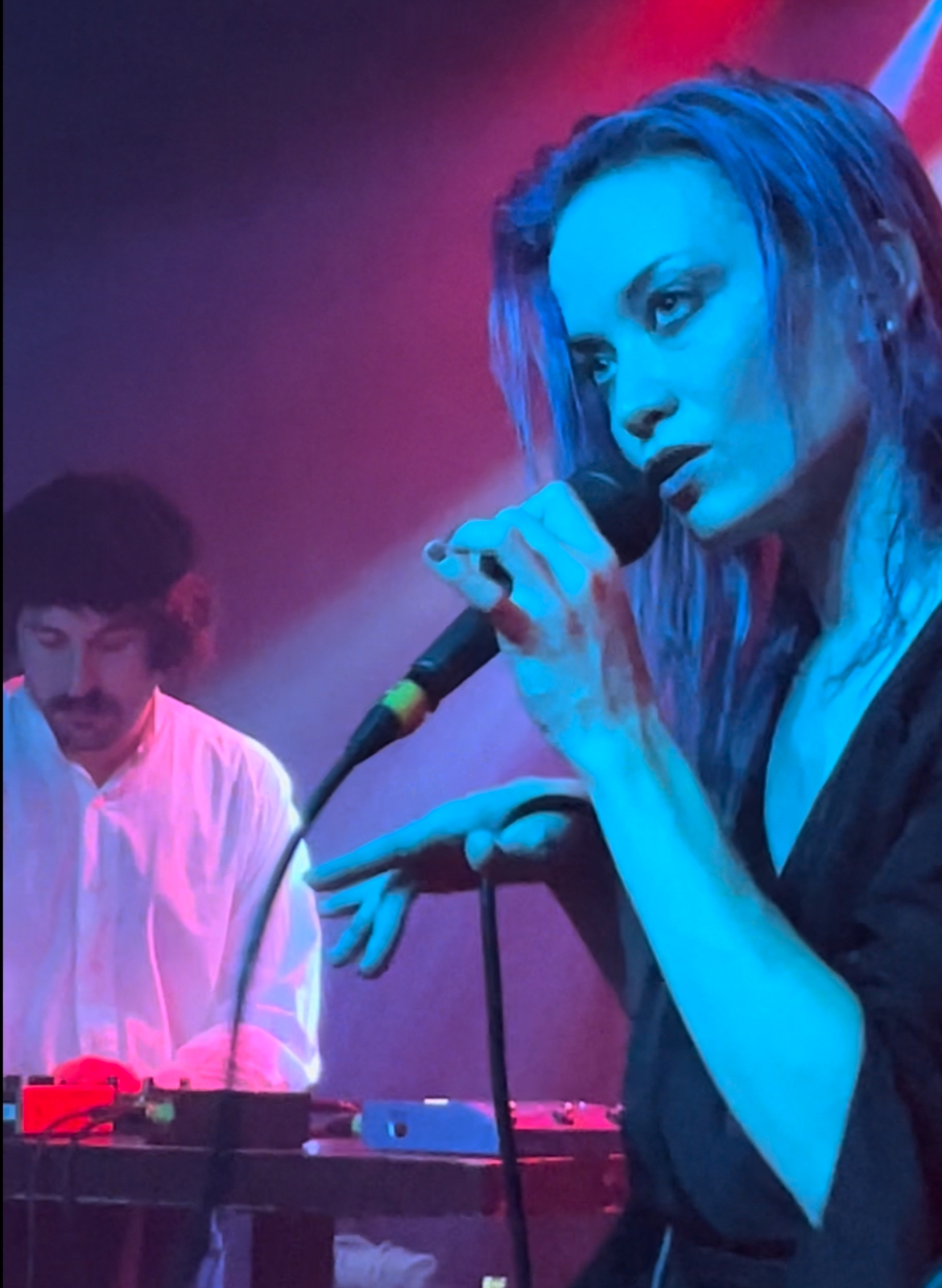
- Linea Aspera performing live

Background information
- Origin: London, England
- Genres: Dark wave, minimal wave, cold wave
- Years active: 2011–2013, 2019–present
- Label: Dark Entries
- Members: Zoè Zanias; Ryan Ambridge
- Website: www.darkentriesrecords.com/bands/linea-aspera/

Linea Aspera is an English electronic music duo from London, formed in 2011. The band is fronted by vocalist Zoè Zanias (born Alison Lewis), with Ryan Ambridge on synthesizers. Zanias writes the lyrics while Ambridge writes the electronics, as well as mixing and producing the recordings.

The band name is derived from the anatomical term linea aspera, which refers to the muscle attachment on the back of the human femur. The band felt the English translation of "rough line" fit their style and the biological themes in their songs.

== History ==
Founded in November 2011, Linea Aspera are influenced by electronic bands from the 1980s. A reviewer reporting on a gig in January 2012 noted that their music sounded "very '80s", and that they had "sprung fully-formed" from the musical underground of East London. That month self-releasing an extended play cassette, titled Linea Aspera EP, it was described by the Burning Flame website as number one in their Top 20 EPs of 2012.

Signing to Dark Entries Records, the band's first album, Linea Aspera LP, was released on 25 September 2012. Brought out digitally and on vinyl by Dark Entries, a CD release was produced by the German company Genetic Records. Each LP was contained in a jacket sleeve designed by Dovile Shurpo and accompanied by an insert listing their song lyrics.

The band's first North American tour was planned for November 2012, but it had to be cancelled as a result of visa issues.

Linea Aspera effectively disbanded in January 2013, but played one final show in February at the first Grauzone Festival in Amsterdam. Zoè Zanias formed Keluar with Sid Lamar from Schwefelgelb and later decided to go solo under the Zanias moniker.

On 16 September 2019, Linea Aspera posted "Hey, we're back!" on their Facebook page and announced a number of gigs in Europe. A year later they self-released their second album, LP II. Linea Aspera finally played their first United States show on 18 October 2022 at New York City's Saint Vitus Bar. In 2024, they released their first new song in four years, "Mycelium".

== Discography ==
Title	Release date	Length	Label	Formats
Linea Aspera EP	28 January 2012	Extended Play	Self-release	Cassette
Linea Aspera II	27 July 2012	Extended Play	Self-release	Cassette
Linea Aspera LP	25 September 2012	Long Play	Dark Entries	12" vinyl record, CD, Digital
Preservation Bias	27 June 2019	Long Play	Dark Entries	Vinyl, Digital
Linea Aspera LP II	7 September 2020	Long Play	Self-release	Vinyl, Digital
