= Ghosts (Sleeping at Last album) =

Studio album by Sleeping at Last
- Released: October 7, 2003
- Recorded: Electrical Audio, Chicago, Illinois
- Genre: Rock, contemporary Christian music
- Label: Interscope
- Producer: Bjorn Thorsrud, Sleeping at Last

Sleeping at Last chronology
Capture (2000)	Ghosts (2003)	Ghosts of Christmas Past EP (2005)

Ghosts is the second studio album, and the first and only on a major label, by the alternative rock band Sleeping at Last. It was released on October 7, 2003, on Interscope Records. The band had some success with the single "Say".

== Background and recording ==
The band initially received major record label attention after providing the Smashing Pumpkins frontman Billy Corgan a copy of their self-released first album, Capture, in March 2001. While not credited as a producer, he did help the band shape the album:

"We've had so many conversations with [Corgan]. He never interfered with what we wanted to do, but he'd tell us what he thought was really strong. He'd say, 'That's a great direction. You can tap into more of that, if you want.' He taught us a lot about song arrangement. And he always said he really believes in what we're doing."

Frontman Ryan O'Neal spent the following two years writing the album, including writing out the lyrics on an old typewriter, without composing any of the music in mind during the sessions. With all of the lyrics written, he then began working on applying the lyrics to musical compositions; some went effortlessly, while others took extensive reworking. Corgan, impressed with the work, helped them secure a record deal with Interscope Records in late 2002. The band cancelled plans to record an EP in order to focus efforts on their first major record label album. The band had planned to start the recording sessions in 2002 and to release the album in early 2003, but the recording sessions did not start until the beginning of 2003 and it took six months to complete. The band recorded in music producer Steve Albini's Electrical Audio studio, and according to the studio's recommendation, worked with Susan Voelz on the album's orchestral arrangements, as the band generally knew the sounds they wanted to make, but did not necessarily have the means to convey it on paper. Corgan also helped to put them in contact with a number of people in the music industry who he had previously worked with, including the producer Bjorn Thorsrud, with whom Corgan had recently collaborated on his Adore and Machina/The Machines of God albums with the Smashing Pumpkins, and with the mixer Alan Moulder, who had also worked on the Machina sessions.

== Promotion and release ==
The album was released on October 7, 2003. The band found some success with their single "Say". The song was featured prominently on Fuse TV's "Oven Fresh" countdown, appearing at the top of the chart. The band also performed the single live on Fuse's IMX program. The band toured extensively in support of the album, doing a national tour with Switchfoot and also touring with Corgan's other band at the time, Zwan. The album's title track was used in the Warner Brothers television show version of Tarzan.

== Reception and aftermath ==
Professional ratings
Review scores
Source	Rating
Allmusic	4/5 stars
Melodic	3.5/5 stars
Hip Online	6/10 stars

The album was generally well received by critics. AllMusic favorably compared the album to the work of Radiohead and U2, stating, " Ghosts could have easily become yet another album bleeding emo-inflected tears for the torturous souls of its creators. Instead, it's a life-size star map flecked with glimmering jewels of melody and the wondering promise of youth." Melodic praised the album's "huge" and "dream-like" sound. Hip Online was less positive about the album, stating that, overall, the album represented a failed attempt to create a Radiohead, U2, Goo Goo Dolls or Britpop album.

The band chose to leave Interscope before independently releasing their follow up album, Keep No Score. The split was amicable, with Ryan O'Neal saying that working with the label had overall been a positive experience, but the band was so hands-on with the process that they felt they could do just as well independently.

== Track listing ==
All tracks are written by Sleeping at Last.

No.	Title	Length
1.	"Say"	4:24
2.	"Currents"	4:32
3.	"All That Is Beautiful"	3:10
4.	"Ghosts"	4:03
5.	"A Skeleton of Something More"	4:56
6.	"Hurry"	4:29
7.	"Everyone"	4:34
8.	"Brightly"	4:21
9.	"Slowly, Now"	4:22
10.	"Night Must End"	3:30
11.	"Trees (Hallway of Leaves)"	5:03
Total length:		47:06

== Personnel ==
Sleeping at Last

- Ryan O'Neal – vocals, guitar, keyboards, string arrangements
- Dan Perdue – bass guitar, keyboards
- Chad O'Neal – drums, percussion

Additional musicians

- Susan Voelz – violin
- Alison Chesley – cello
- Inger Carle – violin
- Vannia Phillips – viola

Production

- Sleeping at Last – arranger, producer
- Bjorn Thorsrud – producer, engineer
- Alan Moulder – mixing
- Ted Jensen – mastering
- Andy Saunders – engineer
- Greg Norman – engineer
- "Rusty" Arbuthnot – engineer
- Azuolas Sinkevicius – digital editing, Pro-Tools
- Dan Perdue – arranger, string arrangements
- Susan Voelz –orchestration, string arrangements, string coordinator
- Paul McMenamin – art direction
