= Panopticon (song) =

Single by The Smashing Pumpkins

from the album Oceania
- Released: September 15, 2012
- Recorded: 2011
- Genre: Alternative rock
- Length: 3:52
- Label: EMI/Caroline
- Songwriter(s): Billy Corgan
- Producer(s): Billy Corgan, Bjorn Thorsrud

The Smashing Pumpkins singles chronology
"The Celestials" (2012)	"Panopticon" (2012)	"Being Beige" (2014)

"Panopticon" is the second single from The Smashing Pumpkins's eighth album Oceania. It was originally released as a promotional single to radio airplay on September 15, 2012.

== Background and recording ==
In an interview with MusicRadar, Corgan stated, "It's similar to Quasar in that we had the opening riff and didn't know what to do with it. It sat for a while, but everybody felt strongly about it. It had a, dare I say, 'modern-feeling' to it, but still in the style of guitar that I like to play. Ultimately, I just sat down and wrote the song on the piano. Sometimes, when you've got a riffy song, it helps to just play the chords with no rhythm, and then you hear the 'song' in it. It's those very Paul McCartney/Wings-type chords – Broadway-type chords. What I'm most proud of from a songwriting standpoint is how it goes from D major to A minor. It goes from a very 'majorly' feel into something sorrowful, almost a Spanish feel. I don't know how the heck I did that, but it's one of my favorite things in the song, how you can keep the key but change the emotion."

== Reception ==
NME described the song as "elegant and dreamy". Consequence of Sound declared that it was "heroic". Spin magazine's review of Oceania focused on Byrne's drumming on Panopticon, stating "the impressive, tom-heavy rumble of "Panopticon" quickly asserts his lithe, explosive, decidedly Jimmy Chamberlain-esque ferocity, a deft balance of muscle and sinew." Artistdirect also emphasized Byrne's contribution by describing his drumming as "flawless percussive propulsion".

The Seattle Post-Intelligencer noted Nicole Fiorentino's "highly musical bass lines".
