= Quasar (song) =

Song by The Smashing Pumpkins

from the album Oceania
- Released: June 19, 2012
- Recorded: April – September 18, 2011
- Genre: Psychedelic rock; acid rock; hard rock
- Length: 4:55
- Label: EMI; Caroline; Martha's Music
- Songwriter: Billy Corgan
- Producers: Billy Corgan; Bjorn Thorsrud

"Quasar" is a song by American alternative rock band the Smashing Pumpkins and the opening track of their eighth studio album Oceania, released on June 19, 2012, written and produced by frontman Billy Corgan and coproduced by Bjorn Thorsrud.

== Music and lyrics ==
"Quasar" features wall of sound and delay effects along with drop-D tuned guitarwork. Lyrically, the song deals with spiritual themes. A central theme throughout the lyrics is the search for "God", or faith. This search for God and spiritual truth or direction is conveyed in lyrics such as "Fated One, hold me down... ...Do I know you?" As well, the song shows the vast diversity of Billy Corgan's spirituality, referencing the Christian God, the disciple Mark, the Hindu God Krishna, and referring to the ineffable name of God used in the Hebrew Bible. Ironically, all of these references appear in the same verse; "God, right on!/Krishna, right on!/Mark, right on!/Yod He Va He Om!", with "Yod He Va He" referring to the Hebrew letters which represent the ineffable name; YHVH.

== Critical reception ==
"Quasar" received mostly positive reviews. Joseph Viney of Sputnikmusic described the song as "a rambunctious, wailing beast of a song with a number of different speeds and moods". Rick Florino of Artistdirect praised the song, declaring that it is "one of the band's heaviest and most hypnotic gems ever". He also eulogized drumming parts of Mike Byrne, Nicole Fiorentino's basslines and Jeff Schroeder's fuzzed-out guitar work, along with Billy Corgan's vocal style. The guitar work of the song was also compared to those of Television by Thomas Conner of The Chicago Sun. He also described the song's style as "Earthy Deep Purple, meet heavenly Kula Shaker".

Many critics noted the resemblances between "Quasar" and previous Smashing Pumpkins songs. Jayson Greene of Pitchfork Media compared the song's introductory riff to those of "Cherub Rock". The same comparison was also made by Michael Nelson of Stereogum, Evan Rytlewski of The A.V. Club and Rob Harvilla of Spin. Iann Robinson of CraveOnline similarly analogized the riff to "Bullet with Butterfly Wings", while contrasting "Quasar" with its vocals and underlying guitar parts, which make it "less vitriolic and more fist pumping". Matt Collar of AllMusic likened the song's spiritual lyrics to those of another Pumpkins song, "Siva". Enio Chiola of PopMatters described the song as a "psychedelic approach to hard rock" and "a God-themed anthem", while inferring from the song that the album "seems like nothing new from the overwrought percussion heavy loudness that was Zeitgeist". Dan Martin of NME referred to the song as "something approaching QOTSA channelling Zep's 'Whole Lotta Love'".

== Personnel ==
- Billy Corgan – vocals, guitar, keyboards, production
- Jeff Schroeder – guitar
- Nicole Fiorentino – bass guitar, backing vocals
- Mike Byrne – drums, backing vocals
