= The Celestials =

The Celestials may refer to:

- Celestial (comics)
- Celestial Empire
- The Celestials (song), a song by The Smashing Pumpkins
