= Oceania (The Smashing Pumpkins album) =

2012 studio album by the Smashing Pumpkins

Studio album by the Smashing Pumpkins
- Released: June 19, 2012
- Recorded: April – September 18, 2011
- Genre: Alternative rock; psychedelic rock; progressive rock
- Length: 60:02
- Label: Martha's Music
- Producer: Billy Corgan; Bjorn Thorsrud

The Smashing Pumpkins chronology
Teargarden by Kaleidyscope (2009-2014)	Oceania (2012)	Monuments to an Elegy (2014)

Singles from Oceania
- 1. "The Celestials" Released: June 19, 2012; 2. "Panopticon" Released: September 15, 2012

Oceania is the eighth studio album by American alternative rock band the Smashing Pumpkins, released on June 19, 2012 through Martha's Music. The album was produced by Billy Corgan and Bjorn Thorsrud, and forms part of the band's 34-track music project Teargarden by Kaleidyscope. It was their first studio album to feature guitarist Jeff Schroeder, and their only album to contain contributions from bassist Nicole Fiorentino and drummer Mike Byrne, who replaced original drummer Jimmy Chamberlin.

The album was a critical and commercial success, debuting at number four on the Billboard 200. As of September 2012, Oceania sold over 102,000 copies in the US. A live performance of the album, Oceania: Live in NYC, was released on September 24, 2013.

== Background and recording ==
On April 26, 2011, in a video on the band's Facebook fan page, frontman Billy Corgan announced plans to release Oceania as "an album within an album," relating to Teargarden by Kaleidyscope which involved releasing songs one by one, for free on the Internet from late 2009, and then releasing them in EPs – after claiming that albums are a dead medium. While Oceania may appear to contradict that, Corgan explains:

"I still stand by my view that I don't think albums are particularly relevant at this time. That may change. But as far as making music...from a writing point of view, it's really going to focus me to put a group of songs together that are supposed to go together."

Corgan later admitted that they switched back to the album format because he "...reached a point where I saw that the one-song-at-a-time idea had maxed itself out...I just saw we weren't getting the penetration in to everybody that I would have hoped."

The band finished mixing the album on September 18, 2011.

Oceania was the first full-length album recorded with guitarist Jeff Schroeder, and the only album recorded with drummer Mike Byrne and bassist Nicole Fiorentino. The band was supplemented in-studio by an unnamed session keyboardist. Fiorentino had this to say about her role in recording Oceania:

"I think because we are all working together on this record it is naturally going to have a different vibe than any of the other records on which Billy played most of the instruments himself. I think we delved into new territory for sure, but what I love about this record is that it has that familiar old-school Pumpkins feel to it, with a modern twist. The cool thing is he was able to capture the energy of the old material without ripping it off. Billy's definitely found his way back to whatever he was tapping into when writing Gish and Siamese Dream."

Guitarist Jeff Schroeder also hinted that the album may be less heavy than past albums, stating "In this day and age, with what's going on politically and socially, it just feels right to play something that's a little more spacey and dreamy. We want music to move people on an emotional level."

In November 2011, the album's release date was pushed back to spring 2012 and announced via Twitter.

Corgan has said that Oceania is the Pumpkins' "best effort since Mellon Collie". Comparing it to his previous works, he said, "it is the first time where you actually hear me escape the old band. I'm not reacting against it or for it or in the shadow of it."

== Writing and composition ==
In describing Oceania's theme, Billy Corgan said the album is partly about "people struggling to find a social identity in today's fast-paced, technology-rich culture", adding "I think alienation seems to be the key theme – alienation in love and alienation in culture," he says.

Regarding the album's lyrical content, Corgan noted "If you listen to the lyrics, it was written around some serious relationship strife. When somebody breaks your heart, you can choose to accept, embrace, and forgive them, as opposed to condemn them. I got a few albums out of [sic] condemn! Now I'm working on compassion as a device."

== Release and promotion ==
The album was tentatively scheduled to be released on September 1, 2011, but the release date was pushed to June 19, 2012. On March 27, 2012, EMI/Caroline Distribution announced that it has entered into an exclusive agreement with Martha's Music to release the album on June 19, 2012. In late May 2012, the band announced that they were holding an event called "Imagine Oceania", requesting fans to take and submit their own photos for the album. On June 12, the album was made available to stream in full via iTunes. The album also became available for full streaming on Spotify, SoundCloud, Spinner, and Ustream. Corgan appeared on The Howard Stern Show on June 19, performing an acoustic version of "Tonight, Tonight". Howard Stern interviewed Corgan for more than an hour and premiered "Violet Rays" from the album. On June 21, 2012, "The Celestials" was released as the album's first single. They performed the song on The Tonight Show with Jay Leno on August 23, 2012. "Panopticon" was released as the second single on September 15, 2012. In 2014, the song "My Love is Winter" was featured on the soundtrack for the video game Watch Dogs.

The album cover features the North Shore Sanitary District Tower.

Oceania: Live in NYC is a concert film recorded at Brooklyn’s new Barclays Center in New York City on December 10, 2012. The concert was released on several home audio and video formats on September 24, 2013. The show includes a performance of Oceania in full.

== Reception ==
Professional ratings
Aggregate scores
Source	Rating
AnyDecentMusic?	6.8/10
Metacritic	72/100
Review scores
Source	Rating
About.com	4/5 stars
AllMusic	4/5 stars
Artistdirect	5/5 stars
Consequence of Sound	4/5 stars
CraveOnline	8/10 stars
Express.co.uk	4/5 stars
Ology	B+
Pitchfork	6.3/10
Sputnikmusic	4/5 stars
Toronto Sun	4/5 stars

According to Billboard, the album in its first week of release sold 54,000 copies in the US, debuted at number four on the Billboard 200 chart and at number one on the Independent Albums chart—making it the band's seventh top 10 album to date. The album has received generally positive reviews. On Metacritic, which assigns a normalized rating out of 100 to reviews from mainstream critics, the album has received thus far an average score of 72, indicating "generally favorable reviews". RedEye gave the album three stars out of four, saying "Oceania, the first full-length Pumpkins album since 2007's Zeitgeist, is the best thing Corgan and Co. have produced in quite some time. Longtime fans will hear hints of the grungy, vicious band of the Gish era and also the mellow, almost pop Adore era. It's a mix that works." Antiquiet gave album four out of five stars and called it "best Corgan work in a decade". Gigwise gave the album four stars out of five and praised its production and themes. Toronto Sun gave the album four stars out of five, saying "With Billy Corgan, bigger is better. And his latest project—the ongoing 44-song Teargarden by Kaleidyscope—is his most ambitious since 2000's Machina. In keeping, this 'album-within-an-album' bears all the classic Pumpkins hallmarks: Searing guitars and busy drums, epic songs and complex arrangements, wistful romanticism and bombastic grandeur. His best work in years."

PopMatters gave the album seven out of 10 stars, describing the album as "...a spinoff that doesn't hold the brilliance of an original, but is charismatic in its own right. A more grown-up manifestation of the adolescent self-obsessed gloomy beginnings." BBC gave the album a positive review, saying "On Oceania Smashing Pumpkins sound energised and alive." About.com gave the album four stars out of five, saying "Corgan has claimed that friends who had heard Oceania had claimed it was his best since Mellon Collie and the Infinite Sadness. Time will tell, but for now it's clear that Oceania is the first Smashing Pumpkins record since then to fully stimulate the senses and stir the heart." AllMusic gave the album four out of five stars, saying "On Oceania there are some of the most memorable and rousing songs Corgan has delivered since 1993's Siamese Dream". ARTISTdirect gave the album a five out of five stars, saying "Oceania is the year's best rock record and a milestone for the genre. Hopefully, it incites and inspires a new generation. The Pumpkins are no strangers to that concept..." Ology gave the album a B+, stating it is "...simply a really good new album, one that deserves to be referenced and included in the company of the classic Smashing Pumpkins albums it delightfully demonstrates little interest in resembling." The Chicago Sun-Times gave the album four out of four stars, saying "this album within an album revives Corgan's gutter-epic vision with a clarity and ferocity not seen since 1995's Mellon Collie and the Infinite Sadness." Daily Express gave the album four out of five stars, saying "Oceania is Corgan on especially potent form". Sputnikmusic gave the album four out of five stars, saying "SP have forged ahead to create a record that could well be the catalyst of a stellar second era for one of rock's more interesting groups".

Kerrang! gave the album four stars. and NME gave the album six out of 10 stars and criticised the album because it doesn't feature the original band members. In a brief review, Rolling Stone gave the album three out of five stars and called it "bong prog" and said that Oceania "sounds like Yes hanging in a German disco circa 1977", Stereogum gave album a positive review, calling it a return to form. USA Today gave the album 3.5 out of four stars, praising the production and song writing. The A.V. Club gave the album a B and called it "a solid start to a new Smashing Pumpkins era". Pitchfork Media rated the album 6.3 out of 10, purporting that on Oceania, Corgan plays with a "hired-via-contest crew of strangers" and that it is "difficult not to notice he's repeating himself," comparing several new songs to earlier Smashing Pumpkins hits. The Daily Nebraskan gave the album A− and called it "one of this years best rock records". Consequence of Sound gave the album four out of five stars and called it "best Corgan work in a long time". CraveOnline gave Oceania an 8 out of 10 review, stating that "If Oceania is a testament of what's to come, I may need to pull my old Smashing Pumpkin t-shirt out of the closet." Spin gave a rating of 7 out of 10, declaring that it is "easily Corgan's best work since his rat-in-a-cage heyday." The Seattle Post-Intelligencer scored the album with 4.5 out of five stars, stating it "is full of winners." The album was listed at #48 on Rolling Stone's list of the top 50 albums of 2012, saying "The most recent dispatch from whatever far-off planet Billy Corgan currently resides on is the finest slab of cosmic prog he's thrown down since the Pumpkins' early-Nineties heyday."

== Track listing ==
All tracks are written by Billy Corgan.

No.	Title	Length
1.	"Quasar"	4:55
2.	"Panopticon"	3:52
3.	"The Celestials"	3:57
4.	"Violet Rays"	4:19
5.	"My Love Is Winter"	3:32
6.	"One Diamond, One Heart"	3:50
7.	"Pinwheels"	5:43
8.	"Oceania"	9:05
9.	"Pale Horse"	4:37
10.	"The Chimera"	4:16
11.	"Glissandra"	4:06
12.	"Inkless"	3:08
13.	"Wildflower"	4:42
Total length:		60:02

== Personnel ==
Credits adapted from Oceania album liner notes and AllMusic.

The Smashing Pumpkins

- Billy Corgan – lead vocals, guitar, keyboards, production
- Jeff Schroeder – guitar
- Nicole Fiorentino – bass guitar, backing vocals
- Mike Byrne – drums, backing vocals

Additional personnel

- Geoff Benge – guitar technician
- David Bottrill – mixing
- Balthazar de Ley – studio technician
- Kevin Dippold – engineer, backing vocals
- Ryan Grostefon – engineer
- Bob Ludwig – mastering
- Greg Norman – studio technician
- Richard Shay – photography
- Bjorn Thorsrud – producer
- Noel Waggener – art direction
- Sam Wiewel – engineer
- Jason Willwerth – assistant
- Unnamed in-studio keyboardist.

== Charts ==
=== Weekly charts ===
Chart (2012)	Peak position
Australian Albums (ARIA)	8
Austrian Albums (Ö3 Austria)	25
Belgian Albums (Ultratop Flanders)	25
Belgian Albums (Ultratop Wallonia)	27
Canadian Albums (Billboard)	4
Croatian International Albums (HDU)	34
Danish Albums (Hitlisten)	30
Dutch Albums (Album Top 100)	34
Finnish Albums (Suomen virallinen lista)	33
French Albums (SNEP)	33
German Albums (Offizielle Top 100)	36
Irish Albums (IRMA)	24
Italian Albums (FIMI)	15
Japan Albums (Oricon)	26
New Zealand Albums (RMNZ)	9
Portuguese Albums (AFP)	16
Scottish Albums (OCC)	21
Spanish Albums (Promusicae)	36
Swedish Albums (Sverigetopplistan)	49
Swiss Albums (Schweizer Hitparade)	19
UK Albums (OCC)	19
US Billboard 200	4
US Independent Albums (Billboard)	1
US Top Alternative Albums (Billboard)	2
US Top Rock Albums (Billboard)	2

=== Year-end charts ===
Chart (2012)	Position
US Top Rock Albums (Billboard)	65
