= Storyboards (album) =

Studio album by Sleeping at Last
- Released: August 31, 2009
- Recorded: Electrical Audio, Chicago, Illinois
- Genre: Indie acoustic
- Producer: Sleeping at Last

Sleeping at Last chronology
Keep No Score (2006)	Storyboards (2009)	Christmas Collection 2009 (2009)

Storyboards is the fourth full-length studio album by alternative rock band Sleeping at Last. It was released independently in 2009.

== Track listing ==
No.	Title	Length
1.	"Porcelain"	4:01
2.	"Chandeliers"	3:57
3.	"Naive"	3:51
4.	"Side by Side"	3:23
5.	"Slow & Steady"	4:14
6.	"Clockwork"	4:00
7.	"Unmade"	3:36
8.	"Timelapse"	3:49
9.	"Birdcage Religion"	3:56
10.	"Green Screens"	3:31
11.	"All This to Say"	3:33
