= TheFutureEmbrace =

Studio album by Billy Corgan
- Released: June 21, 2005
- Recorded: October 2004 – March 2005
- Genres: Shoegaze; electronic rock; electronica
- Length: 45:21
- Language: English
- Label: Reprise
- Producers: Billy Corgan; Bjorn Thorsrud

Billy Corgan chronology
The Future Embrace (2005)	AEGEA (2014)

Singles from TheFutureEmbrace
- 1. "Walking Shade"

TheFutureEmbrace is the debut solo album by American musician Billy Corgan, frontman of the alternative rock band The Smashing Pumpkins. Released in June 2005, the album's sound was markedly different from most of Corgan's earlier work, eschewing his characteristic "drums, bass, (and) big-guitars sound" in favor of an electronic sound punctuated with heavily distorted guitar parts reminiscent of shoegaze.

== Background and production ==
After the dissolution of Zwan in late 2003, Corgan set to work on a solo album of songs based on the history of his hometown, Chicago. This project was shelved and Corgan began work on TheFutureEmbrace in late 2004 in his Chicago studio, Pumpkinland. Rather than repeat the sonic territory of his earlier bands, Corgan decided on an electronic sound with shoegaze influences. Regarding the atypical sound of the album, Corgan remarked,

I chose to not use the conventional drums, bass, big-guitars sound both because I'm so identified with it and I felt that there's sort of a corner there that I didn't want to paint myself in, plus it reminds people of the Pumpkins, and I think for a solo record, having your solo work be reminiscent of your past work, particularly with the band you're known for, gets into a trickiness because it makes people sentimental for the old band, and makes them hate you because you're not in the band.

The sound of the album is almost entirely synthesized, with the exception of Corgan's voice and guitar playing. Corgan has an extensive collection of vintage analog synthesizers and drum machines that were employed on the album. The synths were largely programmed by Bon Harris of Nitzer Ebb.

Arrangements on the album followed an unusual process: for each song, Corgan would write the basic structure, and the song's melody was then split into four sections based on the bass, tenor, alto, and soprano voicings of the chord structure. The production team – Corgan, Harris, producer Bjorn Thorsrud, and programmers Matt Walker and Brian Liesegang – would then program different synth melodies in each voicing, and combine them into a multitrack recording. Drums were added, mostly from pre-1985 drum machines. At this point, Corgan would rework vocal parts and record vocals, as well as recording his guitar part. Each song contains a single take of guitar, in stark contrast to the Boston-style multitracking employed on Smashing Pumpkins albums. Despite the challenge of this approach, it was employed for all album tracks as well as an additional 8 outtakes.

The album features backing vocals and a guitar solo by The Cure frontman Robert Smith on a cover of the Bee Gees' song "To Love Somebody", while "DIA" features electronic drums played by Corgan's longtime collaborator, drummer Jimmy Chamberlin, as well as the violin and backing voice of Emilie Autumn.

== Promotion ==
In the lead-up to the album, Corgan generated considerable attention when he started publishing an autobiography, The Confessions of Billy Corgan, on his website, piece-by-piece. The postings are notable for Corgan's candor regarding his family, personal relationships, and activity during different eras of The Smashing Pumpkins. Corgan updated the Confessions on a frequent basis, but after posting an entry titled "Following the Moon (1974)" on July 1, 2005, the entries stopped.

The album was preceded by the June 6 release of "Walking Shade" as a single, as well as an accompanying music video, directed by P. R. Brown, with the Victorian-era-inspired costumes designed by Emilie Autumn. Corgan, with his touring band, performed "Mina Loy (M.O.H.)" on Late Show with David Letterman the day before the album's release. Corgan also appeared on The Tonight Show with Jay Leno, and played "To Love Somebody" on July 14.

Those who pre-ordered the album from the iTunes store received a bonus track from the TheFutureEmbrace recording sessions, "Tilt", which was also included on the Target retail stores exclusive compilation Red Room Vol. 4.

== Release and aftermath ==
Professional ratings
Aggregate scores
Source	Rating
Metacritic	59/100
Review scores
Source	Rating
AllMusic	3/5 stars
Alternative Press	5/5 stars
Blender	2/5 stars
Christgau's Consumer Guide	(dud)
The Guardian	4/5 stars
NME	7/10
Pitchfork	6.4/10
PopMatters	3/10
Rolling Stone	2.5/5 stars
Uncut	2/5 stars

TheFutureEmbrace was released on June 21, 2005. On the day of its release, Corgan took out an ad and wrote that the album "picks up the thread of the as-yet-unfinished work and charter of The Smashing Pumpkins", and also announced plans to reform that band.

TheFutureEmbrace received a mixed response from critics. Jim DeRogatis of the Chicago Sun-Times said the album represented Corgan's "most distinctive and consistent music." Performing well below Smashing Pumpkins releases, it charted at number 89 in the UK and peaked at number 31 in the United States. As of February 2006, the album's domestic sales were a mere 69,000 units sold.

Billy Corgan, with Matt Walker, Brian Liesegang and Linda Strawberry, embarked on an international club tour in support of the album in the summer of 2005. Beginning in 2015, TheFutureEmbrace songs began appearing in Smashing Pumpkins concert sets.

== Track listing ==
All songs written by Billy Corgan, except as noted.

1. "All Things Change" – 3:59
2. "Mina Loy (M.O.H.)" – 3:53
3. "The CameraEye" – 3:04
4. "ToLoveSomebody" (Barry Gibb/Robin Gibb) – 4:00
5. "A100" (Billy Corgan/Bon Harris) – 4:23
6. "DIA" – 4:20
7. "Now (And Then)" – 4:43
8. "I'm Ready" – 3:44
9. "Walking Shade" – 3:14
10. "Sorrows (In Blue)" – 2:48
11. "Pretty, Pretty Star" – 3:46
12. "Strayz" – 3:31

Bonus track

13. "Tilt" (iTunes exclusive)

== Personnel ==
- Billy Corgan – vocals, guitar, drum machine, synth, programming, production, mixing
- Bon Harris – programming, production
- Brian Liesegang – additional programming
- Bjorn Thorsrud – production, mixing, engineering
- Matt Walker – additional programming

Guest musicians

- Emilie Autumn – vocals and violin on "DIA"
- Jimmy Chamberlin – drums on "DIA"
- Robert Smith – vocals and guitar on "ToLoveSomebody"

Production

- Todd Brodie – engineering assistance
- P. R. Brown – sleeve photography and design
- Nikola Dokic – engineering assistance
- Roger Lian – final digital editing
- Ron Lowe – mix engineering
- John Maschoff – engineering assistance
- Alan Moulder – mixing
- Dave Rieley – engineering assistance
- Paul PDub Walton – recording of Robert Smith's parts
- Howie Weinberg – mastering

== Chart position ==
Chart (2005)	Peak position
Australian Albums (ARIA)	24
Belgian Albums (Ultratop Flanders)	91
Belgian Albums (Ultratop Wallonia)	59
Canadian Albums (Nielsen SoundScan)	28
Dutch Albums (Album Top 100)	77
French Albums (SNEP)	73
German Albums (Offizielle Top 100)	67
Irish Albums (IRMA)	25
Italian Albums (FIMI)	35
New Zealand Albums (RMNZ)	25
Spanish Albums (Promusicae)	77
Swedish Albums (Sverigetopplistan)	45
Swiss Albums (Schweizer Hitparade)	82
UK Albums (OCC)	89
US Billboard 200	31
