= The Celestials (song) =

Single by The Smashing Pumpkins

from the album Oceania
- Released: June 19, 2012
- Recorded: 2011
- Genre: Alternative rock
- Length: 3:58
- Label: EMI/Caroline
- Songwriter(s): Billy Corgan
- Producer(s): Billy Corgan; Bjorn Thorsrud

The Smashing Pumpkins singles chronology
"Owata" (2011)	"The Celestials" (2012)	"Panopticon" (2012)

"The Celestials" is the first single from The Smashing Pumpkins' eighth studio album Oceania. It was originally sent to radio airplay as a promotional single on June 21, 2012. The band performed the song on The Tonight Show with Jay Leno on August 23, 2012.

== Background and recording ==
In an interview with MusicRadar, Corgan stated, "I have all of these vintage keyboards that we just crank out when I need something, so I don't really know what's on here. It's some super, highly obscure '70s keyboard." He added, "The arrangement is kind of like classic MTV, circa 1994. You start with the acoustic and then the band kicks in grunge."

== Reception ==
The track has received positive reviews. Tree Riddle of Loudwire praised the track's sound, stating "Acoustic guitar and orchestral swells dominate the beginning, along with Corgan’s tortured vocals (which actually have a better, more polished sound than on other recent works). Once the full band kicks in, you realize that this is the standout track on the album. 'The Celestials' employs all the elements that make a classic Pumpkins song, and is likely the best released under the name in over a decade. Corgan caps off the tune by matching the line "Everything I want is free" with a beautifully reserved lead guitar riff." RedEye favorably compared it to one of the band's biggest songs, "Disarm", from their album Siamese Dream, calling it a "...nod to the Pumpkins' past. Its acoustic guitar and orchestration make it, if not a sibling, then a distant cousin to the classic "Disarm". Similarly, CraveOnline compared it to the most acoustic aspects of their Mellon Collie and the Infinite Sadness album and said that "...The song is catchy but with a injection of prog-rock that keeps it from collapsing on itself."

The track was included on Loudwire's list of "Best Rock Songs of 2012."

== Charts ==
Chart (2012)	Peak position
Belgium (Ultratip Flanders)	62
US Rock Songs (Billboard)	45
