= Kiki Wong =

American musician (born 1989)

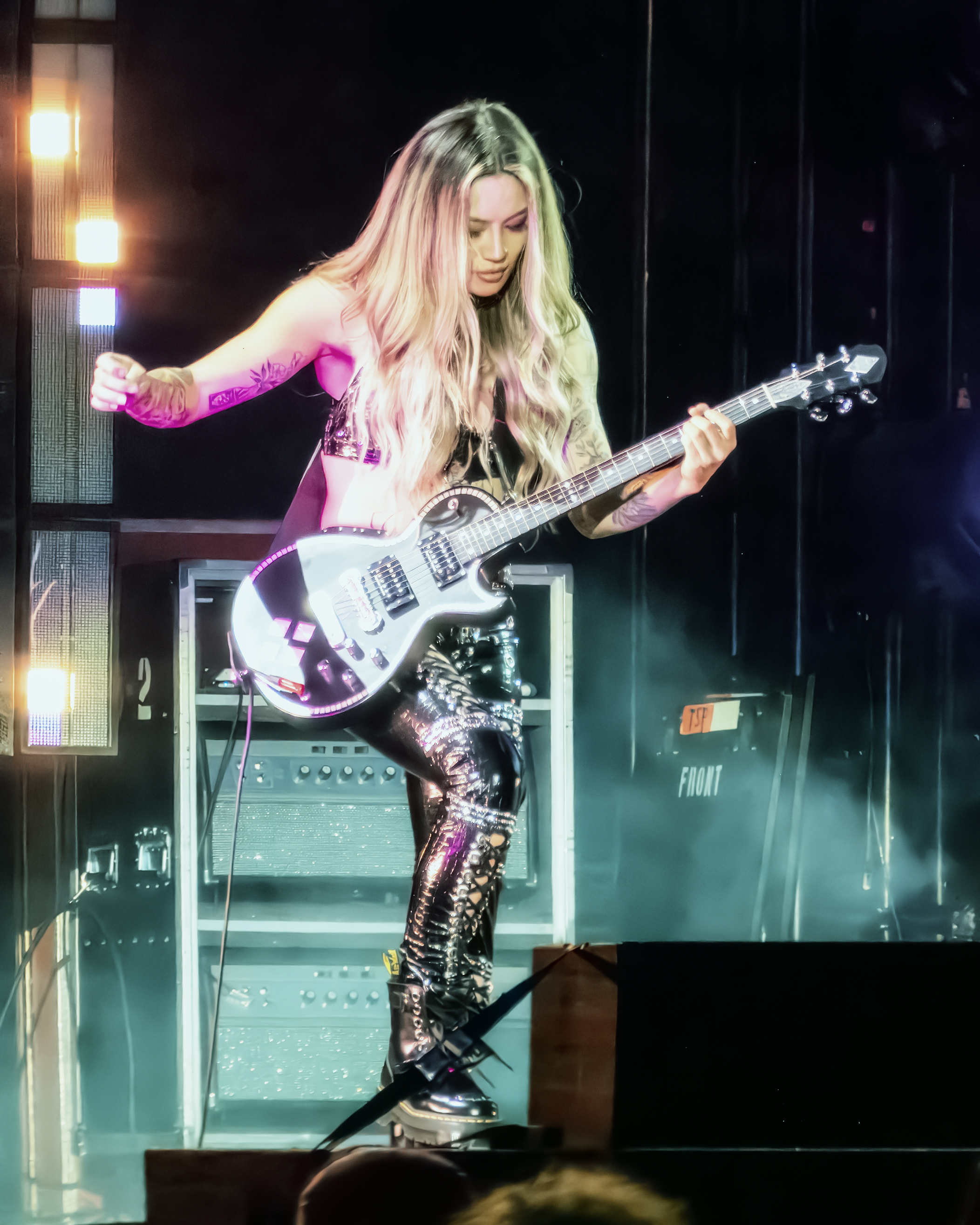
- Wong in 2024

Background information
- Born: April 15, 1989 (age 37)
- Genres: Alternative rock; heavy metal
- Occupation: Guitarist
- Member of: The Smashing Pumpkins
- Formerly of: Nylon Pink
- Website: www.kikiwongo.com

Kiki Wong (born April 15, 1989) is an American musician known for being the touring guitarist of alternative rock band the Smashing Pumpkins. In the 2010s she performed with artists such as Taylor Swift and Usher and was a member of girl band Nylon Pink. She also played in She Demons, put together by Jerry Only of Misfits, and Vigil of War, a band started by DragonForce bassist Alicia Vigil.

While in Nylon Pink she started a popular travel blog with bandmate Kaila Yu, which ultimately led to her accumulating over a million TikTok followers. In 2024, Wong was selected from 10,000 applicants to join the Smashing Pumpkins as their live guitarist with Billy Corgan later commenting that he was already a fan before her application. Wong has said that joining the band has forced her to expand her playing style beyond her heavy metal roots.

== Early life ==
Kiki Wong was born April 15, 1989. She is Korean and Chinese American. Wong says she started playing piano at age six, guitar at thirteen and drums at age sixteen. She graduated from the University of California, Irvine with a bachelor's degree in biological science on a pre-medical track.

== Career ==
=== Early career and session work ===
Wong's first professional gig was as a member of all Asian-American girl band Nylon Pink, whose members she initially met when she took a job on a photoshoot to earn extra money during college. The band played metal and electronic covers of K-pop songs, as well as their own music. After graduating from college in 2011, she took a job working at UCLA Medical Center with neurological patients, which she quit when Nylon Pink was offered a tour of China. This tour was ultimately cancelled, so Wong did what she describes as "all kinds of other odd jobs in between to make ends meet". She says touring with Nylon Pink in places like Japan, Macau, Malaysia and South America is how she discovered her love of travel, and "learned to play my heart out no matter how shitty the venue or crowd is".

Wong had a range of work as a session musician in 2014: drumming for Taylor Swift at the MTV Video Music Awards, playing with Usher at CBS's Fashion Rocks, and playing lead guitar for Bret Michaels of Poison in a Nissan commercial.

Wong subsequently joined the all-girl punk band She Demons (later called Hellfire Heart), put together by Jerry Only of Misfits. She toured the US with She Demons in 2015 as Misfits' opening act. The band also featured Alicia Vigil of Dragonforce, Constance Antoinette of Demi Lovato and Priya Panda of Diemonds. Wong has said that when the band ended she went through "a pretty low moment" and took a step back from music, spending some time in corporate jobs. She worked for a music tech business in South Korea and a startup incubator in Silicon Valley.

=== Blogging, social media and return to music ===
2016 saw Wong start a travel blog with Kaila Yu, singer of Nylon Pink. Within six months it had 100,000 visitors a month and Wong was making appearances on TV news to discuss her travel experiences. The pair also self-published a book, 30-Day Travel Challenge: How To Make Your Travel Dreams A Reality.

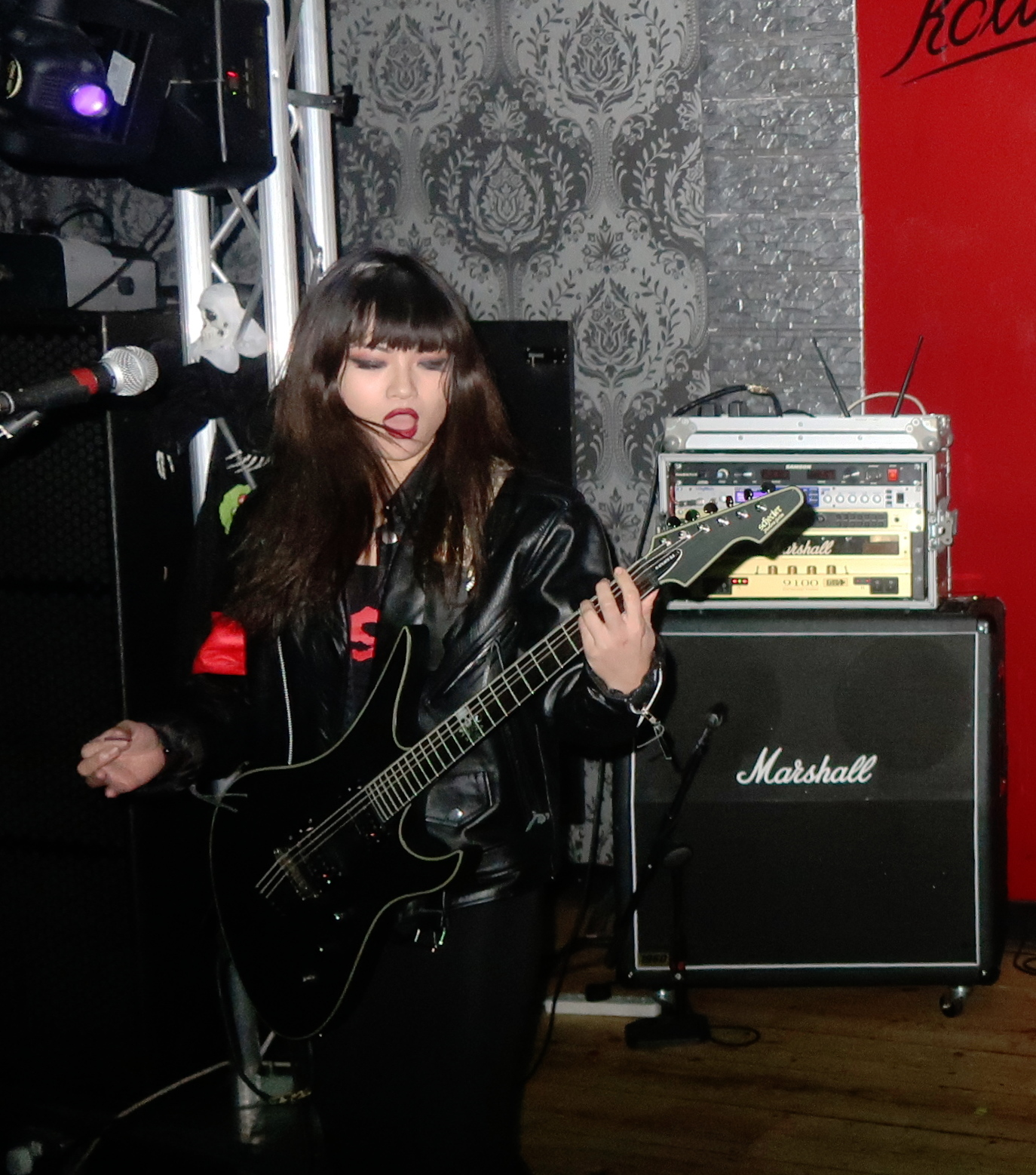
Kiki Wong performing in London with Vigil Of War

Wong returned to music when asked to join a tour in 2019 , playing guitar and bass with Vigil of War, a band started by Wong's She Demons bandmate Alicia Vigil, who is also bassist for DragonForce. At this point Wong says she hadn't played guitar for three years and had only a few weeks to practise before the tour, but that it rekindled her love for music.

When the COVID-19 pandemic stopped plans that Wong and Yu had for travel to Estonia, Thailand, and South Africa, they instead started posting on TikTok. Wong then started posting videos of herself playing guitar, which Inked magazine says "earned her true viral star status". As of 2023, Wong had 655,000 Instagram followers and 1.3 million TikTok followers. She has said that the topic of social media can be touchy for musicians as many see it as a joke, "but it's a joke that can get you out there if you use it properly". She has responded to accusations of being "just a TikTok influencer" by saying that she has been playing "real shithole" venues since 2010.

=== The Smashing Pumpkins ===
Wong was chosen from 10,000 applicants to play with the Smashing Pumpkins after former member Jeff Schroeder announced he was leaving the band in 2023. The band held an open call for applications in January 2024, and Wong was encouraged to apply by her boyfriend. After a Zoom call with the band where Wong and Smashing Pumpkins' frontman Billy Corgan discussed Dimebag Darrell of Pantera, Wong was one of nine people invited to audition in person in Los Angeles in March 2024. She was given four songs to play: "Bullet with Butterfly Wings", "Cherub Rock", "Jellybelly", and "Today". Wong later said "I practiced those songs in and out like my life depended on it for three weeks. I watched every live video I could find of those songs, trying to analyze every move they made. I wanted to make sure I did it right, not just do it the way I thought it sounded". She was announced as the Smashing Pumpkins' new guitarist in April, and played her first show with the band in June, a tour date with Weezer. Billy Corgan has said he was a fan of Wong before she applied to join the band.

== Equipment and playing style ==
Before joining Smashing Pumpkins, Wong told Guitar Girl Magazine that she'd played Ibanez and Schecter guitars for years "because of the heavy metal tones and body shapes". At this time, she didn't use many effects pedals, instead dialling in her tone through Marshall or Kemper amps. She auditioned for the Smashing Pumpkins using a Zemaitis guitar.

She told Spin that on joining the Smashing Pumpkins, it was initially difficult to transition from her background of playing "really crunchy metal" towards playing with "vibey" clean tones. Talking to Guitar World, she explained: "There's so much feel and rhythmic eloquence that goes into their style of playing. I’ve been taking guitar lessons, going back to the blues roots, and even playing more acoustic to integrate it into my playing".

Playing with the band has also required Wong to use more effects pedals. She has described their early rehearsals as "like a guitar pedal boot camp" where she had to "remember to activate and deactivate six different things". While Wong has described herself as previously being a one trick pony, she says she now has a more diverse playing style, and has been exposed to new sounds and effects through her work with the Smashing Pumpkins.

Guitar World reported that at her first show with the Smashing Pumpkins she used some guitars especially suited to playing metal, including two Jackson Rhoads models, a PRS Custom, a Yamaha Revstar, and the same Zemaitis with which she auditioned. During Wong's first tour with Smashing Pumpkins, she got a sponsorship deal with PRS Guitars after having been given a contact at the company by Herman Li from DragonForce.

== Publications ==
- Wong, Kiki; Yu, Kaila (2019). 30-Day Travel Challenge: How To Make Your Travel Dreams A Reality. Kindle Direct Publishing. ISBN 9781733767606.
