= Sleeping at Last =

Musical project

- Origin: Wheaton, Illinois, U.S.
- Years active: 1999–present
- Labels: Interscope, Asteroid B-612
- Members: Ryan O'Neal
- Past members: Chad O'Neal; Dan Perdue
- Website: sleepingatlast.com

Sleeping at Last is a musical project led by singer-songwriter and multi-instrumentalist Ryan O'Neal (Born July 17, 1983). The project initially began in Wheaton, Illinois, as a three-piece band with Ryan O'Neal as the lead singer and guitarist, his brother Chad O'Neal (Born December 6, 1979) as the drummer, and Dan Perdue (Born August 28, 1981) as the bassist. The band independently recorded their debut album, Capture in 2000, which they used to attract the attention of Smashing Pumpkins frontman Billy Corgan, who helped them get signed to a major record label, Interscope Records. The band released their only major label album, Ghosts in 2003, before going independent again and releasing Keep No Score in 2006, and Storyboards in 2009.

Eventually, both Chad O'Neal and Dan Perdue left the band to pursue other interests. Ryan O'Neal chose to retain the use of the band's name for his work from that point on but opted to focus on single songs.

== History ==
=== Early years; Capture, Ghosts, and Keep No Score (1999–2006) ===
Sleeping at Last was originally formed in 1999 in Wheaton, Illinois, and consisted of Ryan O'Neal, his brother Chad O'Neal (drummer), and Dan Perdue (bass guitarist). Their first album, Capture, was released in 2000. The group built a significant local following and opened for bands such as Kill Hannah and Plain White T's, attracting the attention of Billy Corgan, who got them signed to Interscope Records in 2002. Their major label debut, Ghosts, followed in 2003.

National touring ensued, first opening for Switchfoot, then for Billy Corgan's side project Zwan, Yellowcard, Something Corporate, the Format, and Bleu. They received airplay on Fuse TV and their song "Quicksand" was featured in the third season of Grey's Anatomy. Their third full-length, Keep No Score, was released independently in 2006.

=== Departure of Chad O'Neal and Storyboards, Yearbook (2008–2011) ===
On November 29, 2008, it was announced that drummer Chad O'Neal would be moving on to pursue other interests. In 2009, the band independently released their Storyboards album, which featured a guest orchestral arrangement by the legendary Van Dyke Parks. On July 15, 2010 the band announced via their website that starting on October 1, 2010 until September 1, 2011 they would be releasing three songs on the first day of each month for one year, a project they named Yearbook. The songs were released on their website in twelve separate EPs named after the month in which they were released (e.g. January, February, etc.). As of December 8, 2011, all 12 EPs became available in one Yearbook box set for $45.00. On May 22, 2011 it was announced that bassist and keys player Dan Perdue would be stepping down to pursue other interests, with the band continuing with Ryan O'Neal as the only permanent member.

Yearbook songs "Homesick" and "Watermark" were featured in the ABC television show, Private Practice in Season 3 (2010), followed by "Yearbook" songs "Emphasis" and "Wires" being featured on Private Practice in Season 4 (2011). "Tethered" (also on "Yearbook") was featured in season 8 (2012) of the ABC television show Grey's Anatomy. "From the Ground Up" from Yearbook: December was featured in the season 7 finale of Bones.

On September 26, 2011 it was announced that a new Sleeping at Last song will be featured in the film, The Twilight Saga: Breaking Dawn – Part 1, with a song called "Turning Page", written exclusively for the film. "Turning Page" and "Turning Page (Instrumental)" appeared exclusively on The Twilight Saga: Breaking Dawn – Part 1 Original Motion Picture Soundtrack, released on November 8, 2011.

On June 6, 2012, Sleeping at Last released an 8-bit remix EP entitled "8-Bits". The EP is composed of one song from each of the last three Sleeping at Last studio albums and one song from the Yearbook project. The songs were remixed by Michael Carroll and Steven Padin from The Reign of Kindo. The EP was released for free on NoiseTrade.

=== Atlas project (2013–present) ===
O'Neal teased his latest project on his blog in late 2012, showing an image with the date "12.12.12" on it. Two days before December 12 that year, O'Neal revealed the details of Atlas, what he described as "an ongoing series of [EP]s". In the blog post, O'Neal said that the artwork would "play a very special role in [the] project" and that he had turned to Geoff Benzing to "paint one painting for each of the 28+ songs".

In December 2013, the song "In the Embers" from the album Atlas: Light was used by Turner Classic Movies as the soundtrack for the 2013 version of "TCM Remembers," the network's annual tribute to actors, producers, and other filmmakers who died during the year. The lyrics of the song discuss leaving a legacy after death and compares the span of human lives to fireworks, stating that "till our temporary brilliance turns to ash, we pull apart the darkness while we can."

On January 30, 2014 the song "Sun" from the EP Atlas: Space 1 was used in the trailer for the book-based movie The Fault in Our Stars.

On July 8, 2014, Sleeping at Last released Atlas: I, a compilation of the previous year's six extended plays.

In 2014 the song "Light" from the album Atlas 1 was used on the OST of The Little Death.

On February 18, 2015, O'Neal announced, via his Facebook page, that Atlas: II would be coming out in the spring of 2015. On April 2, O'Neal recorded two covers, "Today Has Been Okay" and "Chasing Cars", that were both used in the eleventh season of Grey's Anatomy. On May 18, the subscribers of Atlas: II were able to listen to the first two songs, "Overture II" and "Life". It was released on iTunes on May 26. On June 13, O'Neal recorded an OST for the new upcoming movie Many Beautiful Things that was available on Spotify. On August 13, the artist’s single "Countdowns" was the feature song at the end of the next to last episode of The Astronaut Wives Club – The Dark Side. It played as the wives held their breath for Apollo 8 going around the back side of the moon and as the wives go their separate ways in life. On September 18, the first EP of Atlas: II, Atlas: Life, was released on iTunes and Spotify.

On August 10, 2021, O'Neal announced on his blog that the first song of Atlas: III, "Overture III / Awake" would be coming out on the 24th of that month for those with subscriptions. It was released officially on iTunes on September 10. In a blog post on that date, he also announced that Elicia Edijanto would be doing the artwork for all of the songs in Atlas: III. The release of "Overture III / Awake" included an instrumental version, and an acoustic version of "Awake" arrived the following month. Each subsequent song in Atlas: III would have instrumental and acoustic recordings as well. "Asleep", a companion to "Awake", debuted in April 2022.

On June 11, 2024, O'Neal announced via newsletter that he would officially be ending the hiatus on Atlas: III, and that his new song "Bloom (Eros)" was now available for recipients of said newsletter. This song would be the first in a series inspired by the seven Greek versions of love. "Bloom (Eros)" would debut publicly on June 28th, 2024.

== Discography ==
=== Albums ===
Date	Title
2000	Capture
2003	Ghosts
2006	Keep No Score
2009	Storyboards
2011	Yearbook
2014	Atlas: I
2015	Many Beautiful Things (Original Motion Picture Soundtrack)
2017	Atlas: Space
2019	Atlas: II
2020	Astronomy, Vol. 1
2021	Yearbook (Ten Year Anniversary)
2023	Molecule 1
2023	Space for Sleep (Kaleidoscope Remix)
2024	Astronomy, Vol. 2
2024	Atlas: Survive
2024	Atlas: Connect
2025	Atlas: Reach
2026	Atlas: Shape
2026	Atlas: Sustain

=== Compilations ===
Date	Title
2009	Christmas Collection 2009
2013	Christmas Collection 2013
2014	Covers, Vol. 1
2014	Christmas Collection 2014
2016	Neighbors, Vol. 1
2016	Covers, Vol. 2
2017	Christmas Collection, Volume One
2020	Covers, Vol. 3
2023	Christmas Collection, Volume Two

=== Extended plays ===
Date	Title
1999	There's a Quiet Understanding
2005	Ghosts of Christmas Past
2010	Yearbook: October
2010	Yearbook: November
2010	Yearbook: December
2011	Yearbook: January
2011	Yearbook: February
2011	Yearbook: March
2011	Yearbook: April
2011	Yearbook: May
2011	Yearbook: June
2011	Yearbook: July
2011	Yearbook: August
2011	Yearbook: September
2012	8-Bits
2013	Atlas: Darkness
2013	Atlas: Light
2013	Atlas: Space 1
2013	Atlas: Space 2
2014	Atlas: Land
2014	Atlas: Oceans
2015	Atlas: Life
2016	Atlas: Senses
2016	Atlas: Emotions
2017	Atlas: Intelligence
2019	Atlas: Enneagram
2022	Awake/Asleep
2023	Mother
2025	Atlas: Revere

=== Singles ===
Date	Title
2012	"Turning Page"
2012	"We're Still Here"
2012	"Masquerade"
2013	"Clockwork"
2013	"I'm Gonna Be"
2014	"All Through the Night"
2014	"Saturn"
2015	"Today Has Been OK"
2015	"Chasing Cars"
2015	"I'll Keep You Safe"
2015	"Countdowns"
2015	"Atlas: Son"
2015	"Atlas: Daughter"
2015	"Already Gone"
2015	"Atlas: Touch"
2015	"As Long as You Love Me"
2015	"Atlas: Taste"
2016	"Atlas: Smell"
2016	"Atlas: Hearing"
2016	"Atlas: Sight"
2016	"Atlas: Joy"
2016	"Atlas: Sorrow"
2016	"Atlas: Anger"
2016	"Atlas: Fear"
2017	"Atlas: Body"
2017	"Atlas: Heart"
2017	"Atlas: Mind"
2017	"Atlas: One"
2017	"Atlas: Two"
2017	"August 21, 2017: Total Solar Eclipse"
2017	"September 15, 2017: Cassini – The Grand Finale"
2017	"December 13, 2017: Geminid Meteor Shower"
2018	"Atlas: Three"
2018	"Atlas: Four"
2018	"Atlas: Five"
2018	"Atlas: Six"
2018	"Atlas: Seven"
2018	"Hill"
2018	"Everywhere I Go"
2018	"August 12, 2018: Perseid Meteor Shower"
2019	"Atlas: Eight"
2019	"Atlas: Nine"
2019	"April 10, 2019: Powehi – Image of a Black Hole"
2019	"Can't Smile Without You"
2020	"January 30, 2020: Spitzer - Final Voyage"
2020	"Amazing Grace"
2020	"Young Folks"
2020	"Lake"
2020	"It's a Small World"
2020	"July 4, 2020: Aphelion"
2020	"July 22, 2020: C / 2020 F3 - Comet Neowise"
2020	"Landslide"
2020	"Saturn (feat. Tim Fain)"
2020	"Breathe Deep"
2020	"The Secret of Christmas"
2020	"Rudolph the Red-Nosed Reindeer"
2020	"December 21, 2020: The Great Conjunction"
2021	"February 18, 2021: Perseverance - Mars Landing"
2021	"Hope"
2021	"Turning Page"
2021	"Love Me Like You Do"
2021	"Hammering Heart (Sessions)"
2021	"Overture III / Awake"
2021	"You Are Enough" (Acoustic)
2021	"Awake" (Acoustic)
2021	"Atom 1"
2021	"Atom 2"
2021	"Atom 3"
2021	"It's Beginning to Look a Lot Like Christmas"
2021	"Winter Wonderland"
2021	"December 25, 2021: Webb Space Telescope - Launch"
2022	"Atom 4"
2022	"Atom 5"
2022	"Atom 6"
2022	"Asleep"
2022	"Mother"
2022	"Atom 7"
2022	"June 24, 2022: Parade of Planets"
2022	"Naive (Live Acoustic)"
2022	"It Came Upon the Midnight Clear"
2022	"Snow"
2022	"Snow (String Version)"
2023	"Atom 8"
2023	"Let Down"
2023	"February 1, 2023: C/2022 E3 - Comet Ztf"
2023	"Atom 9"
2023	"To Be Enchanted"
2023	"To Be Enchanted (Voice Memo)"
2023	"Wave After Wave"
2023	"Some Kind of Heaven"
2023	"Bright Sadness"
2023	"Atom 10 & 11"
2023	"Atom 12"
2023	"Atom 13"
2023	"August 30, 2023: Super Blue Moon"
2023	"Atom 14"
2023	"Auld Lang Syne"
2024	"January 4, 2024: Quadrantid Meteor Shower"
2024	"Bloom (Eros)"
2024	"Atom 16"
2024	"Hurt"
2024	"Heal"
2024	"September 29th, 2024: PT5 - Mini Moon"
2024	"Quiet Magic (Storge)"
2024	"Let It Snow"
2025	"January 21, 2025: Planet Parade/Comet Atlas"
2025	"Build"
2025	"Destroy"
2025	"April 17, 2025: Hint of Life - K2-18b"
2025	"Time Lies (Ludus)"
2025	"The Piano (Original Score)"
2025	"Doubt"
2025	"Believe"
2025	"Tell Me the Truth and I'll Believe It"
2025	"Double Down (Pragma)"
2025	"Lean On Me"
2025	"My Favorite Things"
2026	"Have"
2026	"Want"
2026	"An Honest Mirror (Philautia)"
2026	"Source"
2026	"Echo"
2026	"Atom 17"
2026	"Go On Easy"
2026	"Parallel Universe (Philia)"
2026	"Merry Christmas, Darling"

== Members ==
Current

- Ryan O'Neal – lead vocals, guitar, keys (1999–present)

Former

- Dan Perdue – bass guitar, keyboard (1999–2011)
- Chad O'Neal – drums (1999–2008)

== In other media ==
In 2011, the song "Turning Page" appeared in The Twilight Saga: Breaking Dawn – Part 1.

Since 2013, ABC's drama Grey's Anatomy has used many Sleeping at Last songs.

In 2014, CW show The Vampire Diaries used their cover of "All Through the Night".

In 2015, Budweiser used the cover of "I’m Gonna Be (500 Miles)" from Covers, Vol. 1 in their Super Bowl Ad.

In 2022, a book called "The Sleeping Melody" was published with each chapter being the name of a Sleeping at Last-release.

In 2022, NBC medical drama New Amsterdam used their cover of "I'm Gonna Be (500 Miles)"

In 2023, Ryan Reynolds' show Bedtime Stories with Ryan used the song "Moon" in a trailer.

In 2025, Amazon Prime's TV adaptation of We Were Liars used the song "Saturn" in the finale episode.
