= Bjorn Thorsrud =

American record producer and audio engineer (1963–2021)

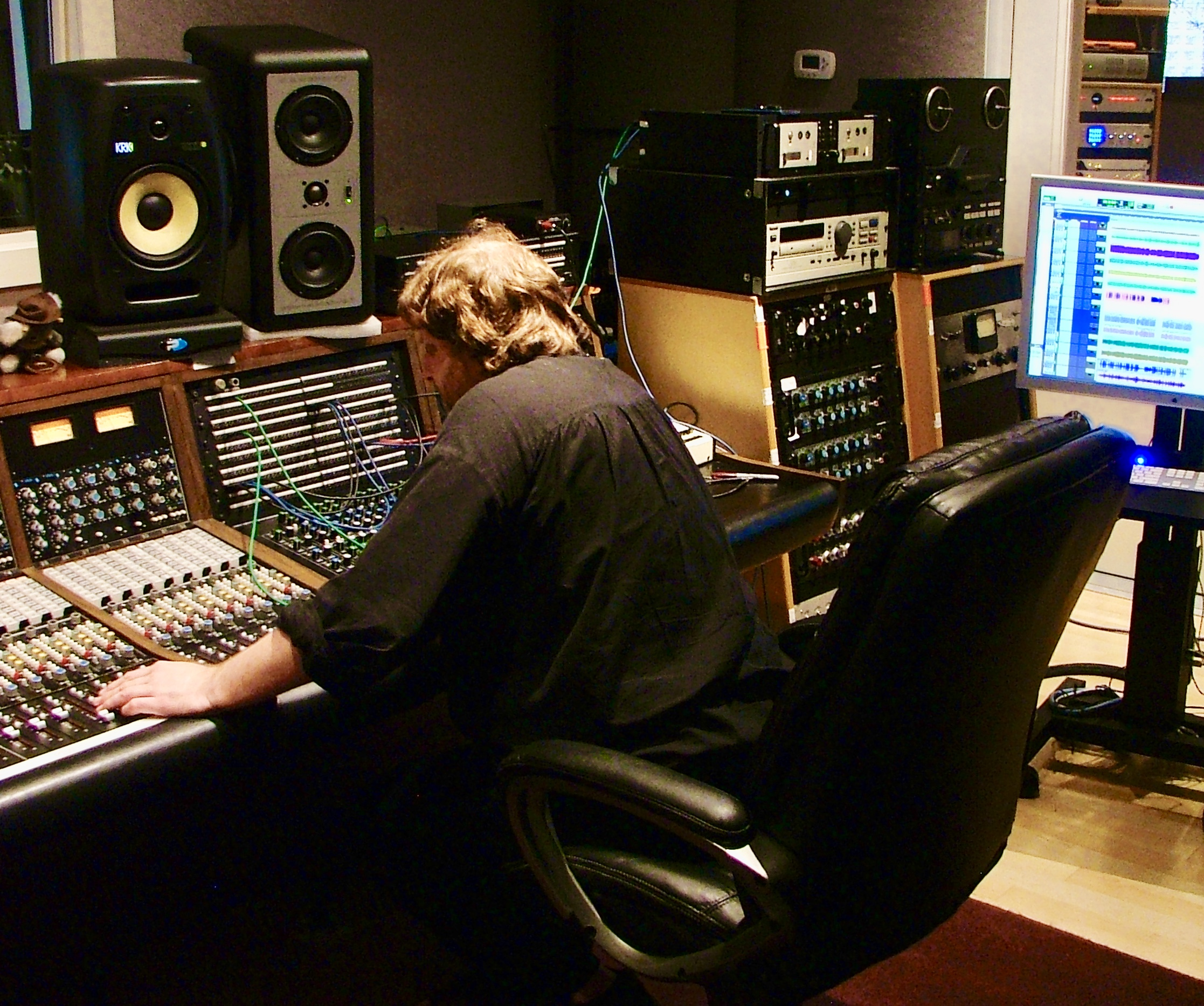
- Thorsrud at work
- Born: October 7, 1963
- Died: October 19, 2021 (aged 58)
- Education: University of Nevada, Reno
- Occupations: Record producer, Audio engineer, Programmer, Mixing
- Years active: 1987– 2021
- Label: EMI Virgin Records

Bjorn Thorsrud (October 7, 1963 – October 19, 2021) was an American music producer, programmer, and audio engineer who produced film scores and albums for rock and pop artists.

He also engineered, mixed, or contributed production or programming to every Smashing Pumpkins record from 1998's Adore to 2012's Oceania. He previously worked for the Taj-Motown Record Company and established his own record label, Tri Records. He held a bachelor's degree in physics and music from the University of Nevada, Reno.

Thorsrud worked with artists including Billy Corgan, David Coverdale, The Dandy Warhols, Bruce Dickinson, Marianne Faithfull, The Frogs, Monster Magnet, Sleeping at Last, The Smashing Pumpkins, Asphalt Socialites, Whitesnake, and Zwan.

He lived in his hometown of Las Vegas, Nevada.

On October 19, 2021, he died suddenly of unreported causes. He was 58 years of age, and died just 12 days after his birthday.

== Discography ==
Year	Album	Artist	Role
1987	Two Hearts	Dave Mason	Assistant engineer
1988	White and Black	Marcos Silva and Intersection	Assistant engineer
1989	AC Black	AC Black	Mixing assistant
1991	Double Action Theatre	Double Action Theatre	Mixing
1991	Fear	Toad the Wet Sprocket	Engineer
1993	Rob & Fab	Rob & Fab	Guitar (acoustic), guitar, producer, engineer, mixing
1994	Balls to Picasso	Bruce Dickinson	Engineer
1994	The Doubting Thomas Band	The Doubting Thomas Band	Producer, Engineer, Arranger
1995	Because They Can	Nelson	Assistant engineer
1995	Crackin' Porcelain	Mudsharks	Assistant engineer
1995	Squalus Suculae	Mudsharks	Engineer
1997	Restless Heart	Whitesnake	Engineer
1997	Come On Over	Shania Twain	Pre-production programming
1997	Honeyrods	The Honeyrods	Editing, assistant engineer
1997	We Will Fall: The Iggy Pop Tribute	Various artists	Digital editing
1998	Adore	The Smashing Pumpkins	Engineer, digital editing
1998	ECW: Extreme Music	Various artists	Digital editing
1998	Let It Ride	Monster Magnet	Digital editing
1999	Stigmata (soundtrack)	Various artists	Engineer, mixing
2000	Into the Light	David Coverdale	Engineer, associate producer
2000	MACHINA/The Machines of God	The Smashing Pumpkins	Programming, engineer, compilation, editing, mixing
2001	Judas O	The Smashing Pumpkins	Producer
2001	Hopscotch Lollipop Sunday Surprise	The Frogs	Producer
2002	Hush	Stacia	Mixing
2002	Kissin Time	Marianne Faithfull	Engineer, mixing
2003	Ghosts	Sleeping at Last	Producer, engineer
2003	Greatest Hits	Monster Magnet	Digital editing
2003	Mary Star of the Sea	Zwan	Producer, mixing
2003	Welcome to the Monkey House	The Dandy Warhols	Producer, engineer
2004	Destiny	Buddy Wright	Engineer
2005	TheFutureEmbrace	Billy Corgan	Producer, engineer, mixing
2005	Passion Juice#17	Da House Playazz	Engineer
2006	After the Chaos II	Royal Bliss	Executive producer
2007	Fantods	The Fantods	Producer, engineer
2007	Zeitgeist	The Smashing Pumpkins	Engineer, mixing assistant
2008	American Gothic	The Smashing Pumpkins	Engineer, mixing
2008	We Used to Be Friends	The Dandy Warhols	Producer, engineer
2009	Bleed To Bloom	Stealing Love Jones	Producer, engineer
2009	Teargarden by Kaleidyscope	The Smashing Pumpkins	Producer, engineer
2012	Oceania	The Smashing Pumpkins	Producer, engineer
2014	Good Soldier	Sierra Swan	Engineer, Mixing
2014	"Forever and whatever..."	Asphalt Socialites	Producer, engineer, mixing, co-writer
