= Keep No Score =

Studio album by Sleeping at Last
- Released: June 21, 2006
- Recorded: January 23–March 26, 2006 at Electrical Audio, Chicago, Illinois and G&GH Studios, Lisle, Illinois
- Genre: Alternative rock
- Label: Independent
- Producer: Sleeping at Last

Sleeping at Last chronology
Ghosts of Christmas Past EP (2005)	Keep No Score (2006)	Storyboards (2009)

Keep No Score is the third full-length studio album by alternative rock band Sleeping at Last. It was released independently in 2006.

== Track listing ==
No.	Title	Length
1.	"Tension & Thrill"	4:35
2.	"Careful Hands"	4:07
3.	"Needle & Thread"	4:58
4.	"Envelopes"	4:30
5.	"Hold Still"	4:48
6.	"Heaven Breaks"	3:53
7.	"Levels of Light"	4:06
8.	"Quicksand"	4:18
9.	"Umbrellas"	4:23
10.	"Sing to Me"	3:45
11.	"Dreamlife"	5:03
12.	"Keep No Score"	2:40
