= The Smashing Pumpkins =

American alternative rock band

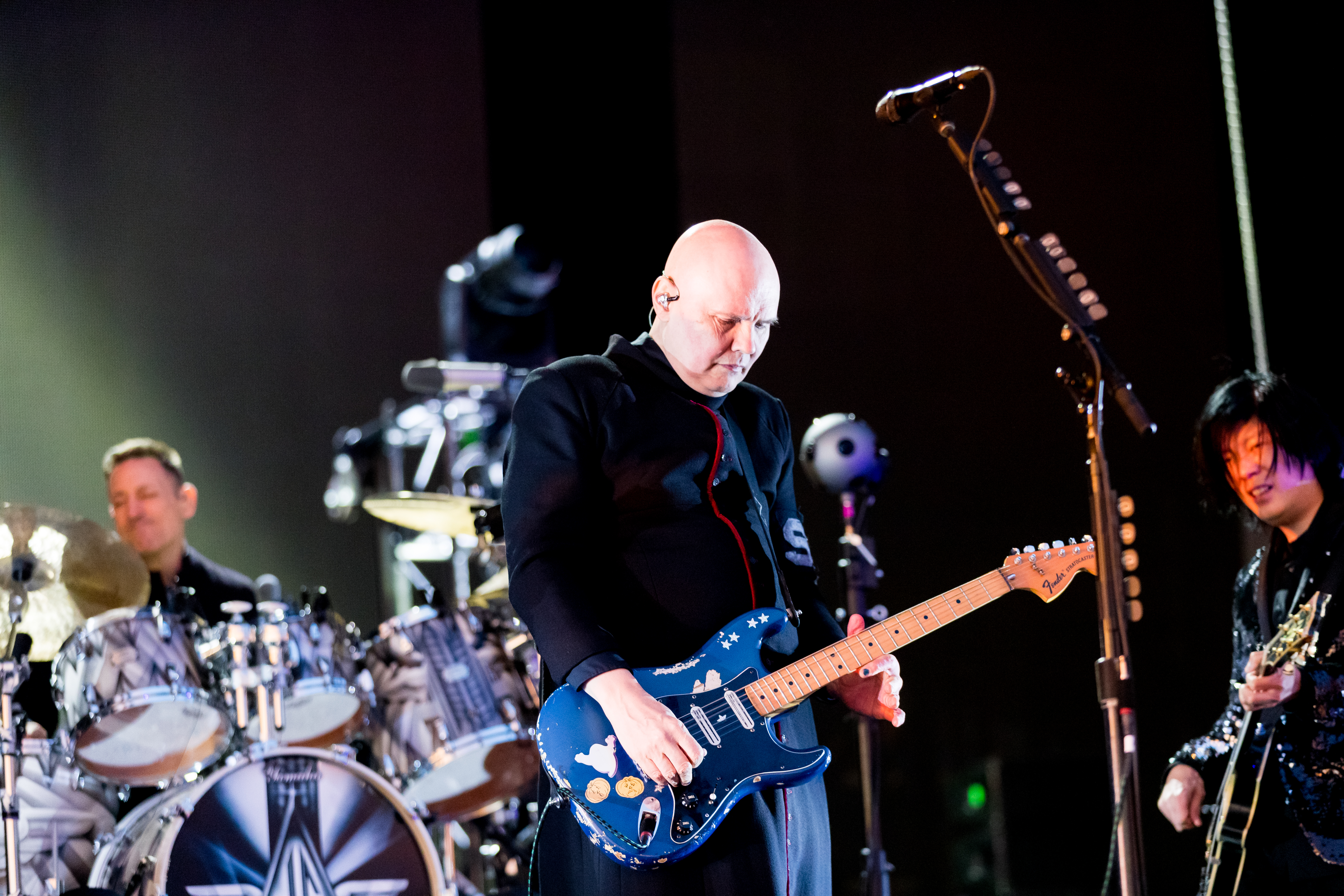
- The Smashing Pumpkins performing in 2019; left to right: Jimmy Chamberlin, Billy Corgan, and James Iha

Background information
- Origin: Chicago, Illinois, US
- Genre: Alternative rock
- Works: Discography; songs
- Years active: 1988–2000; 2006–present
- Labels: Caroline; Constantinople; Hut; Martha's Music; Rocket Science; Virgin; BMG; Reprise; Warner Bros.; Sub Pop; Napalm; Sumerian
- Spinoffs: Zwan
- Members: Billy Corgan; James Iha; Jimmy Chamberlin
- Past members: D'arcy Wretzky; Melissa Auf der Maur; Mike Byrne; Nicole Fiorentino; Jeff Schroeder
- Website: smashingpumpkins.com

The Smashing Pumpkins (also simply known as Smashing Pumpkins) (Note: "Smashing Pumpkins" at the Billboard database and at AllMusic.com, and as both "Smashing Pumpkins" and "The Smashing Pumpkins" at the Rolling Stone database. The band is credited as "Smashing Pumpkins" on the covers of Gish, Siamese Dream, and Zeitgeist (and related singles), and as "The Smashing Pumpkins" between Mellon Collie (1995) and Earphoria (2002), as well as on all releases since Oceania in 2012.) is an American alternative rock band formed in Chicago in 1988 by lead vocalist and guitarist Billy Corgan, guitarist James Iha, bassist D'arcy Wretzky, and drummer Jimmy Chamberlin. The band has undergone several line-up changes since their reunion in 2006, with Corgan being the primary songwriter and sole constant member since its inception. The current lineup consists of Corgan, Iha, and Chamberlin. The band is known for its diverse, densely layered sound, which evolved throughout their career and has integrated elements of gothic rock, heavy metal, grunge, psychedelic rock, progressive rock, shoegaze, dream pop, and electronica.

The band's 1991 debut album, Gish, was well received by critics and became an underground success. With the advent of alternative rock's mainstream breakthrough, their second album, Siamese Dream (1993), established the band's popularity. Despite a tumultuous recording process, the album received widespread acclaim and has been lauded as one of the best albums in the genre. Their third album, Mellon Collie and the Infinite Sadness (1995), furthered the band's popularity; it debuted atop the Billboard 200, received a Diamond certification from the Recording Industry Association of America (RIAA), and continued the band's critical success. After the release of Adore in 1998 and a two-part project in 2000—Machina and Machina II—the group disbanded due to internal conflicts, drug use, and diminishing sales by the end of the 1990s. With 30 million albums sold worldwide, the Smashing Pumpkins were among the most critically and commercially successful bands of the 1990s, and an important act in the popularization of alternative rock.

In 2006, Corgan and Chamberlin reconvened to record the band's seventh album, Zeitgeist. After touring throughout 2007 and 2008 with a lineup including new guitarist Jeff Schroeder, Chamberlin left the band in early 2009. Later that year, Corgan began a new recording series with a rotating lineup of musicians entitled Teargarden by Kaleidyscope, which encompassed stand-alone singles, EP releases, and two full albums that also fell under the project's scope—Oceania in 2012 and Monuments to an Elegy in 2014. Chamberlin became a touring member in 2015, before officially rejoining with Iha in 2018. The reunited lineup then released the albums Shiny and Oh So Bright, Vol. 1 / LP: No Past. No Future. No Sun. in 2018 and Cyr in 2020, in addition to Atum: A Rock Opera in Three Acts across three increments between 2022 and 2023. Schroeder departed from the band in October 2023. Following Schroeder's departure, the band's remaining members released Aghori Mhori Mei in 2024.

== History ==
=== Early years: 1988–1991 ===
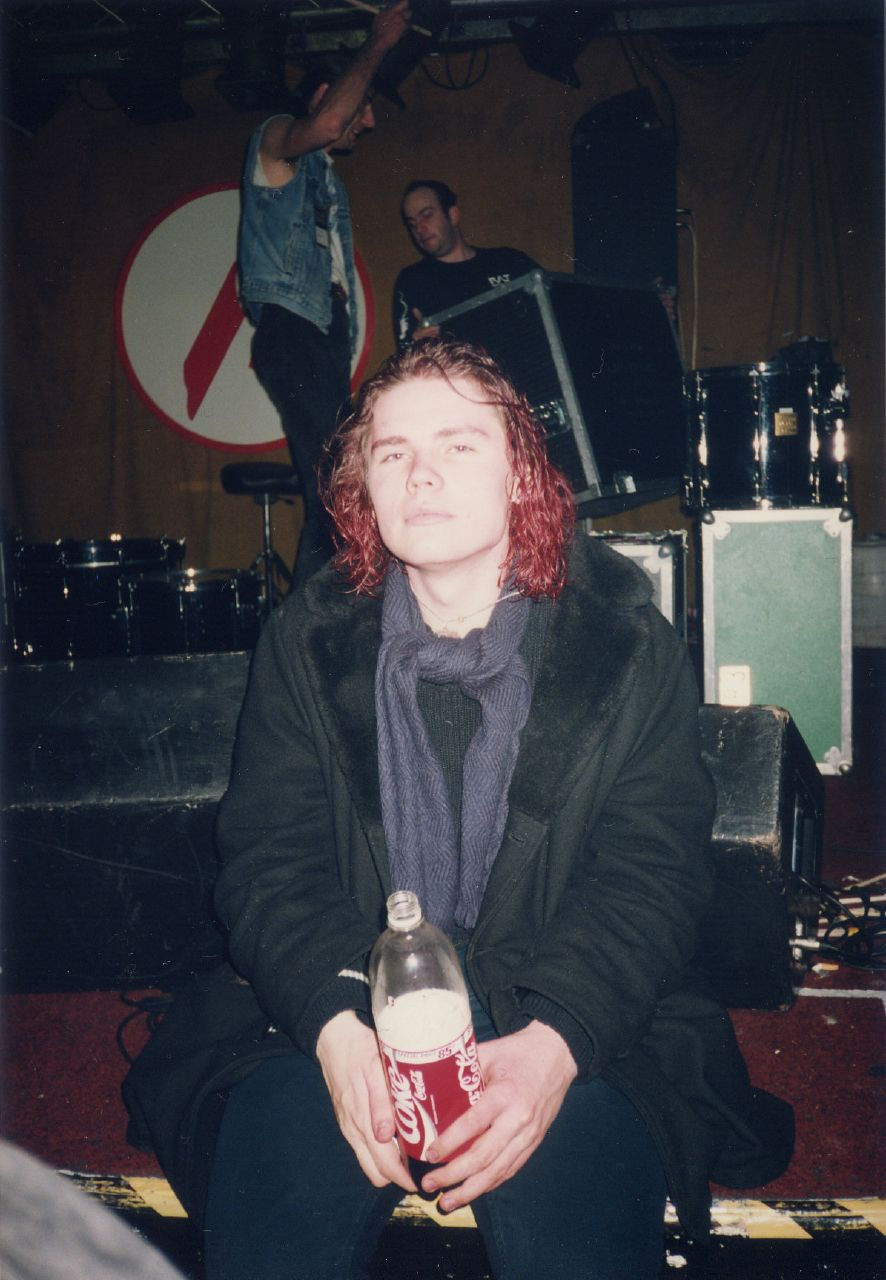
Vocalist Billy Corgan in 1992

After the breakup of his gothic rock and metal band The Marked, singer and guitarist Billy Corgan left St. Petersburg, Florida, and returned to his native city of Chicago, where he took a job in a record store and had the idea to start a band called the Smashing Pumpkins. While working at the store he met guitarist James Iha. Adorning themselves with paisley and other psychedelic trappings, the two began writing songs (with the aid of a drum machine) which were heavily influenced by the Cure and New Order. The duo performed live for the first time on July 9, 1988, at the Polish bar Chicago 21. This performance included only Corgan on bass and Iha on guitar with a drum machine. Shortly thereafter, Corgan met D'arcy Wretzky after a show by the Dan Reed Network where they argued the merits of the band. After finding out that Wretzky played bass guitar, Corgan got her to join the band and the trio played a show at the Avalon Nightclub. After the show, Cabaret Metro owner Joe Shanahan agreed to book the band on the condition that they replace the drum machine with a live drummer.

Jazz drummer Jimmy Chamberlin was recommended by a friend of Corgan's. Chamberlin knew little of alternative music and immediately changed the sound of the nascent band. As Corgan recalled of the period, "We were completely into the sad-rock, Cure kind of thing. It took about two or three practices before I realized that the power in his playing was something that enabled us to rock harder than we could ever have imagined." On October 5, 1988, the complete band took the stage for the first time at the Cabaret Metro.

"Rhinoceros"
Sample of "Rhinoceros," taken from the band's debut album, Gish (1991), and also featured on the Lull EP (1991).

In 1989, the Smashing Pumpkins made their first appearance on record with the compilation album Light Into Dark, which featured several Chicago alternative bands. The group released its first single, "I Am One", in 1990 on the local Chicago label Limited Potential. The single sold out and they released a follow-up, "Tristessa", on Sub Pop; then they signed to Caroline Records. The band recorded their 1991 debut studio album, Gish, with producer Butch Vig at his Smart Studios in Madison, Wisconsin, for $20,000. In order to gain the consistency he desired, Corgan often played all instruments excluding drums, which created tension in the band. The music fused heavy metal guitars, psychedelia, and dream pop, garnering them comparisons to Jane's Addiction. Gish became a minor success, with the single "Rhinoceros" receiving some airplay on modern rock radio. After releasing the Lull EP in October 1991 on Caroline Records, the band formally signed with Virgin Records, which was affiliated with Caroline. The band supported the album with a tour that included opening for bands such as the Red Hot Chili Peppers, Jane's Addiction, and Guns N' Roses. During the tour, Iha and Wretzky went through a messy breakup, Chamberlin became addicted to narcotics and alcohol, and Corgan entered a deep depression, writing some songs for the upcoming album in the parking garage where he lived at the time.

=== Mainstream breakout and Siamese Dream: 1992–1994 ===
With the breakthrough of alternative rock into the American mainstream due to the popularity of grunge bands such as Nirvana and Pearl Jam, the Smashing Pumpkins were poised for major commercial success. At this time, the Smashing Pumpkins were routinely lumped in with the grunge movement, with Corgan protesting, "We've graduated now from 'the next Jane's Addiction' to 'the next Nirvana', now we're 'the next Pearl Jam'."

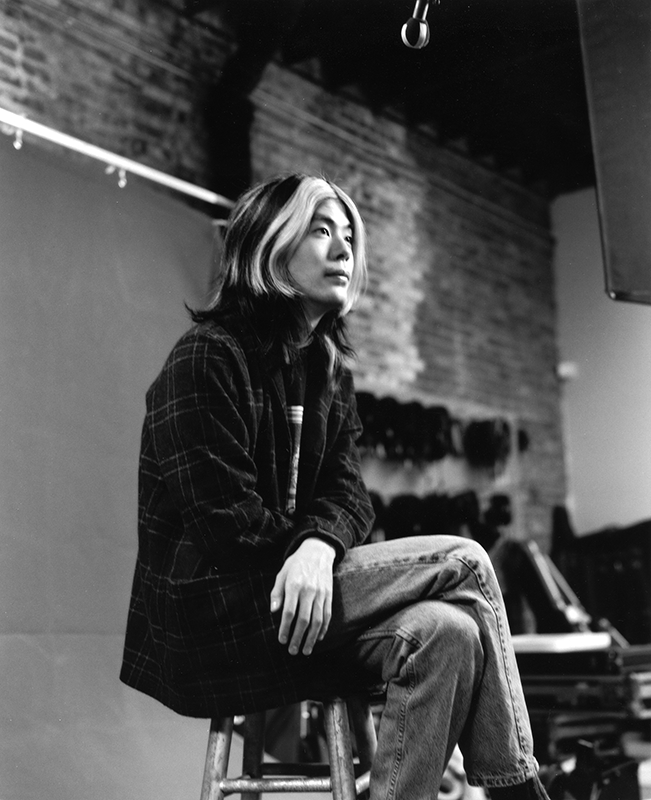
Guitarist James Iha in 1995

Amid this environment of intense internal pressure for the band to break through to widespread popularity, the band relocated to Marietta, Georgia, in late 1992 to begin work on their second album, with Butch Vig returning as producer. The decision to record so far away from their hometown was motivated partly by the band's desire to avoid friends and distractions during the recording, but largely as a desperate attempt to cut Chamberlin off from his known drug connections. The recording environment for Siamese Dream was quickly marred by discord within the band. As was the case with Gish, Corgan and Vig decided that Corgan should play nearly all of the guitar and bass parts on the album, contributing to an air of resentment. The contemporary music press began to portray Corgan as a tyrant. Corgan's depression, meanwhile, had deepened to the point where he contemplated suicide, and he compensated by practically living in the studio. Meanwhile, Chamberlin quickly managed to find new connections and was often absent without any contact for days at a time. In all, it took over four months to complete the record, with the budget exceeding $250,000.

Despite all the problems in its recording, Siamese Dream became the band's mainstream breakthrough, peaking at number ten on the Billboard 200 chart and selling over four million copies in the US alone. Alongside the band's mounting mainstream recognition, the band's reputation as careerists among their former peers in the independent music community was worsened. Indie rock band Pavement's 1994 song "Range Life" directly mocks the band in its lyrics, although Stephen Malkmus, lead singer of Pavement, has stated, "I never dissed their music. I just dissed their status." Former Hüsker Dü frontman Bob Mould called them "the grunge Monkees", and fellow Chicago musician/producer Steve Albini wrote a scathing letter in response to an article praising the band, derisively comparing them to REO Speedwagon ("by, of and for the mainstream") and concluding their ultimate insignificance. Fred Armisen said the band simply "flew past us" in the 90s Chicago music scene after his own band Trenchmouth had produced five albums. The opening track and lead single of Siamese Dream, "Cherub Rock", directly addresses Corgan's feud with the "indie-world". In spite of the backlash, Siamese Dream is often regarded as one of the greatest albums of the alternative rock genre, and one of the best albums of the 1990s.Siamese Dream has been certified platinum seven times.

In 1994 Virgin released the B-sides/rarities compilation Pisces Iscariot which charted higher than Siamese Dream by reaching number four on the Billboard 200. Also released was a VHS cassette titled Vieuphoria featuring a mix of live performances and behind-the-scenes footage. For Christmas 1994 Corgan gave ten copies of an informally self-released five-CD box set, Mashed Potatoes, to close friends of the band. It contained early demos, interview snippets and live recordings dating from 1988 to 1993. Music journalist Ned Raggett called it "the holy grail of Smashing Pumpkins collectibles for the hardcore fanatic". It became available online in the early 2000s.

=== Mellon Collie and the Infinite Sadness: 1995–1997 ===
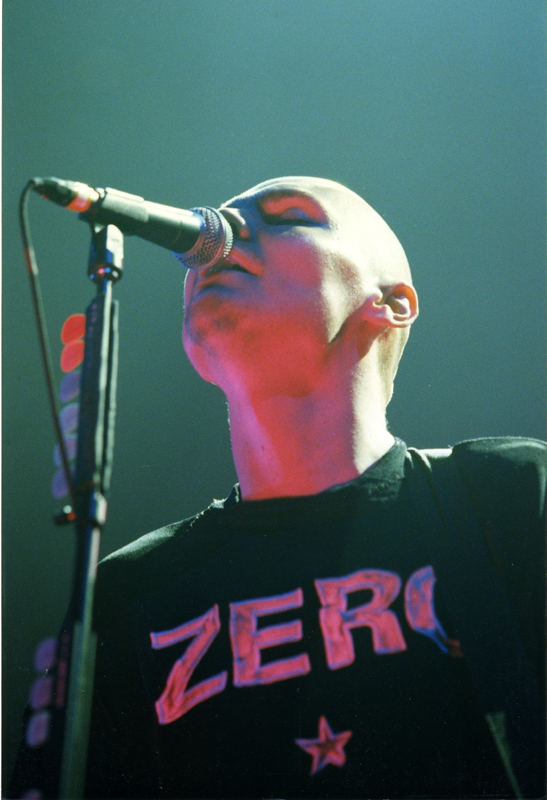
Corgan performing at the Nassau Coliseum on Long Island in January 1997, featuring a shaved head and his iconic "Zero" shirt

During 1995, Corgan wrote about 56 songs, following which the band went into the studio with producers Flood and Alan Moulder to work on what Corgan described as "The Wall for Generation X", and which became Mellon Collie and the Infinite Sadness, a double album of twenty-eight songs, lasting over two hours (the vinyl version of the album contained three records, two extra songs, and an alternate track listing). The songs were intended to hang together conceptually as a symbol of the cycle of life and death. Praised by Time as "the group's most ambitious and accomplished work yet", Mellon Collie debuted at number one on the Billboard 200 in October 1995. Even more successful than Siamese Dream, it was certified eleven times platinum in the United States and became the best-selling double album of the decade. It also garnered seven 1997 Grammy Award nominations, including Album of the Year. The band won only the Best Hard Rock Performance award, for the album's lead single "Bullet with Butterfly Wings". The album spawned five singles—"Bullet with Butterfly Wings", "1979", "Zero", "Tonight, Tonight" which Corgan stated was inspired by the Cheap Trick song "I'll Be with You Tonight", and "Thirty-Three"—of which the first three were certified gold and all but "Zero" entered the Top 40. Many of the songs that did not make it onto Mellon Collie were released as B-sides to the singles, and were later compiled in The Aeroplane Flies High box set. The set was originally limited to 200,000 copies, but more were produced to meet demand.

In 1996 the Pumpkins undertook an extended world tour in support of Mellon Collie. Corgan's look during this period—a shaved head, a long-sleeve black shirt with the word "Zero" printed on it, and silver pants—became iconic. That year, the band also made a guest appearance in an episode of The Simpsons, "Homerpalooza". With considerable video rotation on MTV, major industry awards, and "Zero" shirts selling in many malls, the Pumpkins were considered one of the most popular bands of the time.

In May, the Smashing Pumpkins played a gig at the Point Theatre in Dublin, Ireland. Despite the band's repeated requests for moshing to stop, a seventeen-year-old fan named Bernadette O'Brien was crushed to death. The concert ended early and the following night's performance in Belfast was cancelled out of respect for her. However, while Corgan maintained that moshing's "time [had] come and gone", the band would continue to request open-floor concerts throughout the rest of the tour.

The band suffered a personal tragedy on the night of July 11, 1996, when touring keyboardist Jonathan Melvoin and Chamberlin overdosed on heroin in a hotel room in New York City. Melvoin died, and Chamberlin was arrested for drug possession. A few days later, the band announced that Chamberlin had been fired as a result of the incident. The Pumpkins chose to finish the tour, and hired drummer Matt Walker and keyboardist Dennis Flemion. Corgan later said the decision to continue touring was the worst decision the band had ever made, damaging both their music and their reputation. Chamberlin admitted in a 1994 Rolling Stone cover story that in the past he had "gotten high in every city in this country and probably half the cities in Europe." But in recent years, he had reportedly been clean. On July 17, the Pumpkins issued a statement in which they said, "For nine years we have battled with Jimmy's struggles with the insidious disease of drug and alcohol addiction. It has nearly destroyed everything we are and stand for. ... We wish [him] the best we have to offer". Meanwhile, the band had given interviews since the release of Mellon Collie stating that it would be the last conventional Pumpkins record, and that rock was becoming stale. James Iha said at the end of 1996, "The future is in electronic music. It really seems boring just to play rock music."

=== Adore, departure of Wretzky, Machina, and breakup: 1998–2000 ===
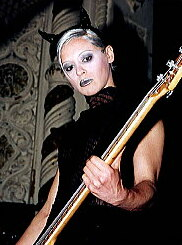
Original bassist D'arcy Wretzky in 1998

After the release of Mellon Collie, the Pumpkins contributed many songs to various compilations. Released in early 1997, the song "Eye", which appeared on the soundtrack to David Lynch's Lost Highway, relied almost exclusively on electronic instruments and signaled a drastic shift from the Pumpkins' previous musical styles. At the time, Corgan stated his "idea [was] to reconfigure the focus and get away from the classic guitars-bass-drum rock format." Later that year, the group contributed "The Beginning Is the End Is the Beginning" to the soundtrack for the film Batman & Robin. With Matt Walker on drums, the song featured a heavy sound similar to "Bullet with Butterfly Wings" while still having strong electronic influences. The song later won the 1998 Grammy for Best Hard Rock Performance. Though Corgan announced that the song represented the sound people could expect from the band in the future, the band's next album would feature few guitar-driven songs.

Recorded following the death of Corgan's mother and his divorce, 1998's Adore represented a significant change of style from the Pumpkins' previous guitar-based rock, veering into electronica. The record, cut with assistance from drum machines and studio drummers including Matt Walker, was infused with a darker aesthetic than much of the band's earlier work. The group also modified its public image, shedding its alternative rock look for a more subdued appearance. Although Adore received favorable reviews and was nominated for Best Alternative Performance at the Grammy Awards, the album had only sold about 830,000 copies in the United States by the end of the year. The album nonetheless debuted at number 2 on the Billboard 200 and sold three times as many copies overseas. The band began a seventeen-date, fifteen-city charity North American tour in support of Adore. At each stop on the tour, the band donated 100 percent of ticket sales to a local charity organization. The tour's expenses were entirely funded out of the band's own pockets. All told, the band donated over $2.8 million to charity as a result of the tour. On October 31, 1998, during Halloween, the band opened for Kiss at Dodger Stadium in Los Angeles, dressed in costume as the Beatles.

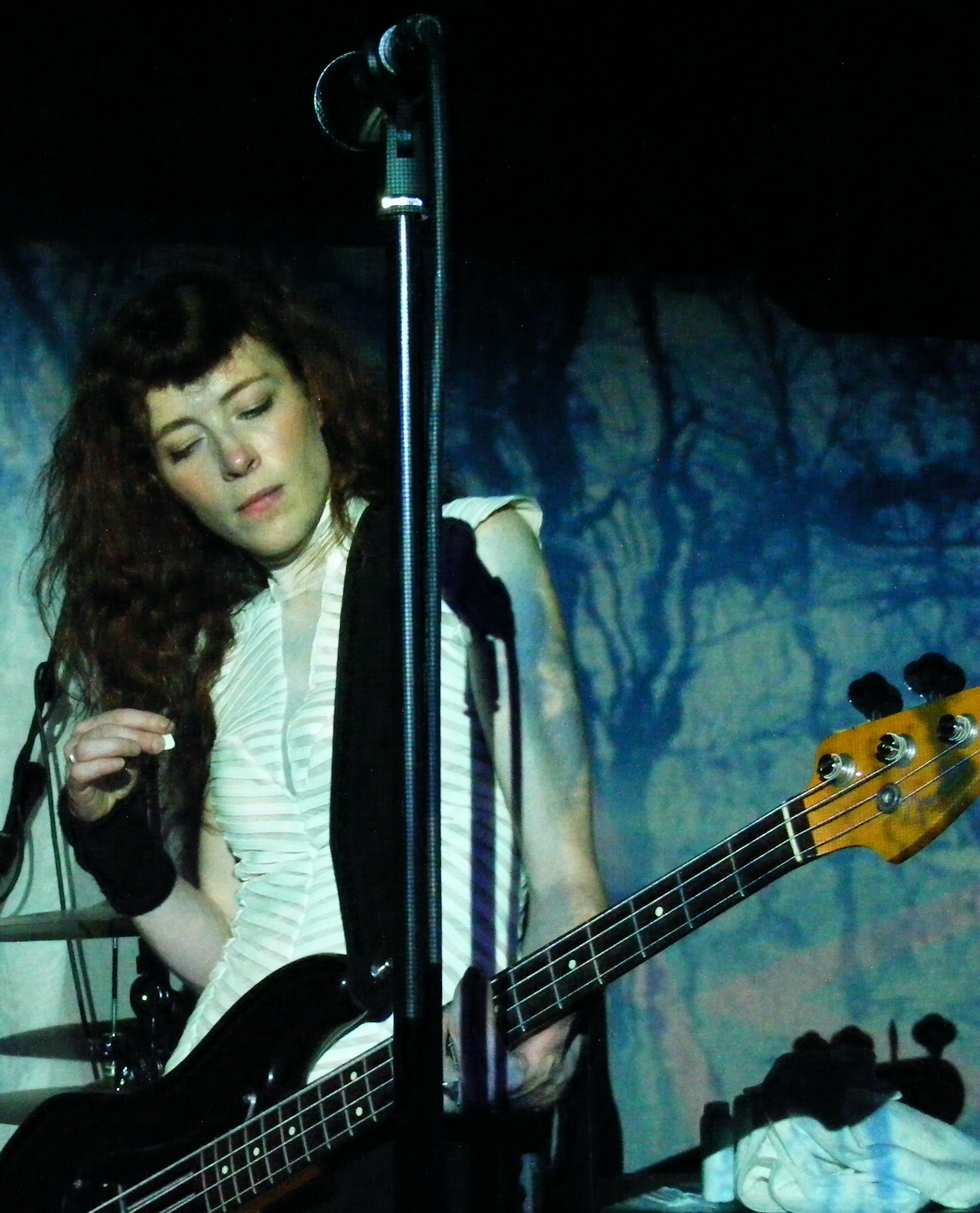
Bassist Melissa Auf der Maur joined after Wretzky's departure in 1999.

In 1999 the band surprised fans by reuniting with a rehabilitated Jimmy Chamberlin for a brief tour dubbed "The Arising", which showcased both new and classic material. The lineup was short-lived, however, as the band announced the departure of Wretzky in September during work on the album Machina/The Machines of God, and the band was subsequently dropped by Sharon Osbourne Management. Former Hole bassist Melissa Auf der Maur was recruited for the Sacred and Profane tour in support of the album and appeared in the videos accompanying its release. Released in 2000, Machina was initially promoted as the Pumpkins' return to a more traditional rock sound, after the more gothic, electronic-sounding Adore. The album debuted at number three on the Billboard charts, but quickly disappeared and as of 2007 had only been certified gold. Music journalist Jim DeRogatis, who described the album as "one of the strongest of their career", noted that the stalled sales for Machina in comparison to teen pop ascendant at the time "seems like concrete proof that a new wave of young pop fans has turned a deaf ear toward alternative rock."

On May 23, 2000, in a live radio interview on KROQ-FM (Los Angeles), Billy Corgan announced the band's decision to break up at the end of that year following additional touring and recording. The group's final album before the break-up, Machina II/The Friends & Enemies of Modern Music, was released in September 2000 in a limited pressing on vinyl with permission and instructions for free redistribution on the Internet by fans. Only twenty-five copies were cut, each of which was hand numbered and given to friends of the band along with band members themselves. The album, released under the Constantinople Records label created by Corgan, consisted of one double LP and three ten-inch EPs. Originally, the band asked Virgin to offer Machina II as a free download to anyone who bought Machina. When the record label declined, Corgan opted to release the material independently.

On December 2, 2000, the Smashing Pumpkins played a farewell concert at the Metro, the same Chicago club where their career had effectively started twelve years earlier. The four-and-a-half-hour-long show featured 35 songs spanning the group's career, and attendees were given a recording of the band's first concert at the Metro, Live at Cabaret Metro 10-5-88. The single "Untitled" was released commercially to coincide with the farewell show.

=== Post-breakup: 2001–2004 ===
In 2001 the compilation Rotten Apples was released. The double-disc version of the album, released as a limited edition, included a collection of B-sides and rarities called Judas O. The Greatest Hits Video Collection DVD was also released at the same time. This was a compilation of all of the Pumpkins promo videos from Gish to Machina along with unreleased material. Vieuphoria was released on DVD in 2002, as was the soundtrack album Earphoria, previously released solely to radio stations in 1994.

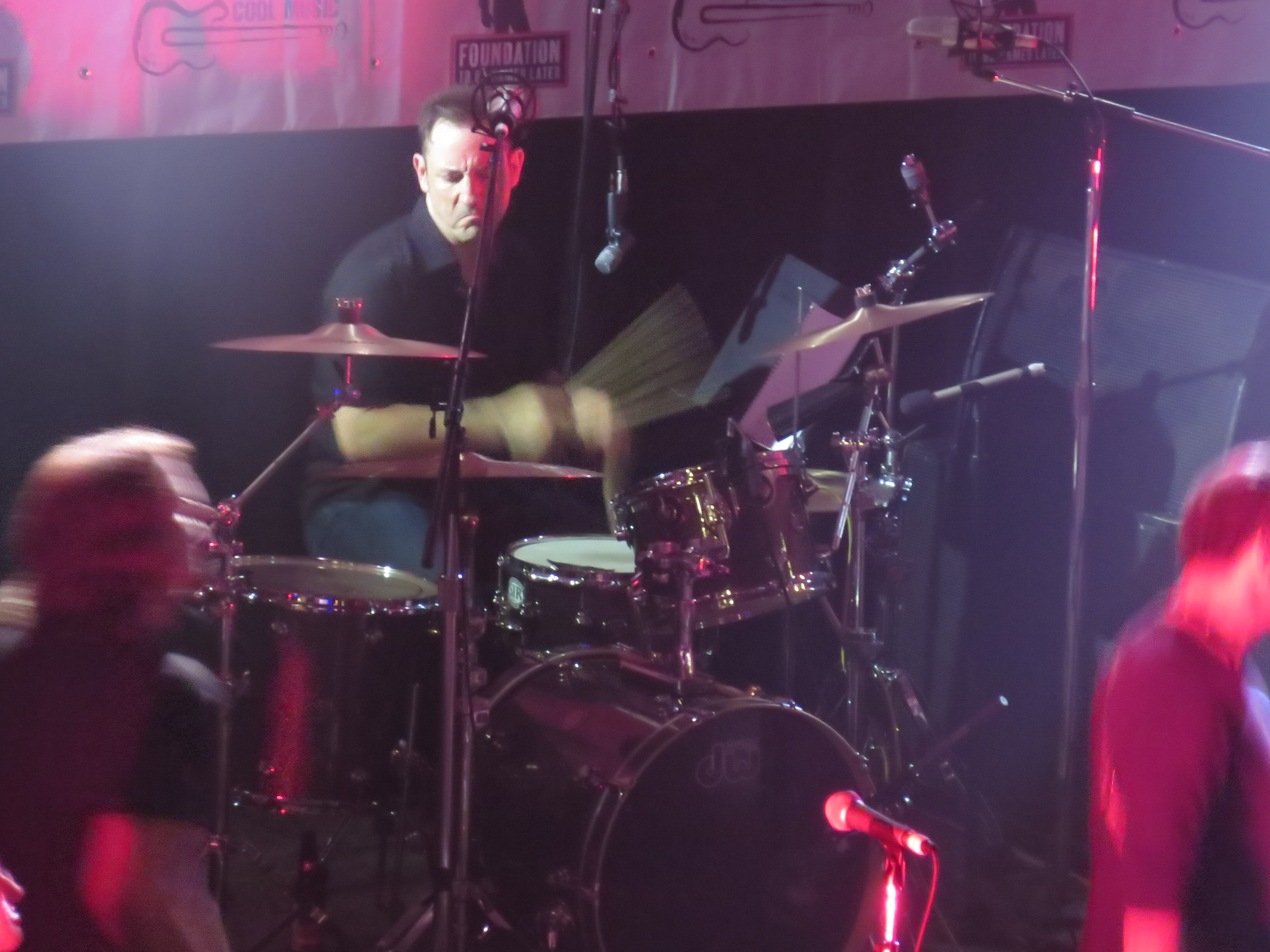
Original drummer Jimmy Chamberlin in 2014

Billy Corgan and Jimmy Chamberlin reunited in 2001 as members of Corgan's next project, the short-lived supergroup Zwan. The group's only album, Mary Star of the Sea, was released in 2003. After cancelling a few festival appearances, Corgan announced the demise of the band in 2003. During 2001 Corgan also toured as part of New Order and provided vocals on their comeback album Get Ready. In October 2004 Corgan released his first book, Blinking with Fists, a collection of poetry. In June 2005, he released a solo album, TheFutureEmbrace, which he described as "(picking) up the thread of the as-yet-unfinished work of the Smashing Pumpkins". Despite this, it was greeted with generally mixed reviews and lackluster sales. Only one single, "Walking Shade", was released in support of the album.

In addition to drumming with Zwan, Jimmy Chamberlin also formed an alternative rock/jazz fusion project band called Jimmy Chamberlin Complex. The group released an album in 2005 titled Life Begins Again. Corgan provided guest vocals on the track "Lokicat". James Iha served as a guitarist in A Perfect Circle, appearing on their Thirteenth Step club tour and 2004 album, eMOTIVe. He has also been involved with other acts such as Chino Moreno's Team Sleep and Vanessa and the O's. He continues to work with Scratchie Records, his own record label, as well. D'arcy Wretzky has, aside from one radio interview in 2009, not made any public statements or appearances nor given any interviews since leaving the band in 1999. On January 25, 2000, she was arrested after she allegedly purchased three bags of cocaine, but after successfully completing a court-ordered drug education program, the charges were dropped.

Corgan insisted during this period that the band would not reform, although when Zwan broke up he announced, "I think my heart was in Smashing Pumpkins [...] I think it was naive of me to think that I could find something that would mean as much to me." Corgan said in 2005, "I never wanted to leave the Smashing Pumpkins. That was never the plan." On February 17, 2004, Corgan posted a message on his personal blog calling Wretzky a "mean-spirited drug addict" and blaming Iha for the breakup of the Smashing Pumpkins. On June 3, 2004, he added that "the depth of my hurt [from Iha] is only matched with the depth of my gratitude". Iha responded to Corgan's claims in 2005, saying, "No, I didn't break up the band. The only person who could have done that is Billy."

=== Reformation and Zeitgeist: 2005–2008 ===
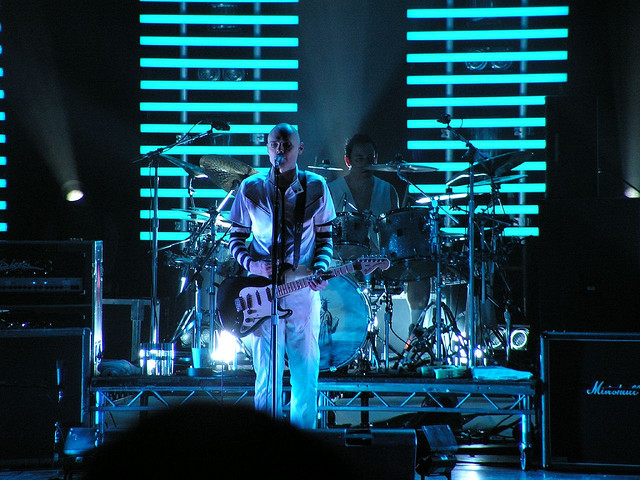
The Smashing Pumpkins on May 22, 2007, at Le Grand Rex, Paris; the band's first show since their break up; left to right: Billy Corgan (front) and Jimmy Chamberlin (back)

On June 21, 2005, the day of the release of his first solo album, TheFutureEmbrace, Corgan took out full-page advertisements in the Chicago Tribune and Chicago Sun-Times to announce that he planned to reunite the band. "For a year now", Corgan wrote, "I have walked around with a secret, a secret I chose to keep. But now I want you to be among the first to know that I have made plans to renew and revive the Smashing Pumpkins. I want my band back, and my songs, and my dreams". Corgan and Chamberlin were verified as participants in the reunion, but there was question as to whether other former members of the band would participate.

In April 2007 Iha and Auf der Maur separately confirmed that they were not taking part in the reunion. Chamberlin would later state that Iha and Wretzky "didn't want to be a part of" the reunion. The Smashing Pumpkins performed live for the first time since 2000 on May 22, 2007, in Paris, France. There, the band unveiled new touring members: guitarist Jeff Schroeder, bassist Ginger Reyes, and keyboardist Lisa Harriton. That same month, "Tarantula" was released as the first single from the band's forthcoming album. On July 7, the band performed at the Live Earth concert in New Jersey.

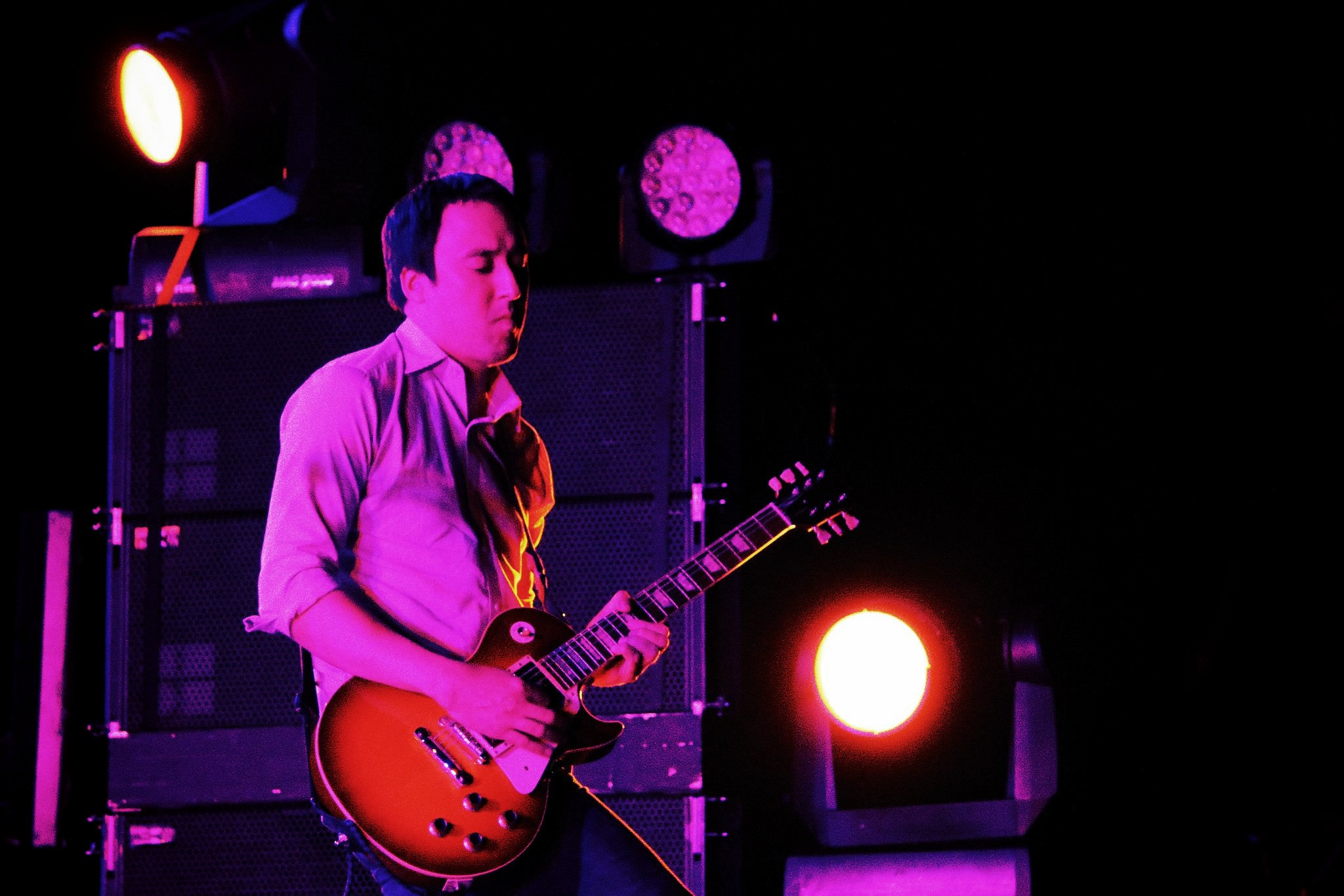
Guitarist Jeff Schroeder joined the band in 2007.

The band's new album, Zeitgeist, was released that same month on Reprise Records, entering the Billboard charts at number two and selling 145,000 copies in its first week. Zeitgeist received mixed reviews, with much of the criticism targeted at the absence of half of the original lineup. The album divided the Pumpkins' fanbase. Corgan would later admit, "I know a lot of our fans are puzzled by Zeitgeist. I think they wanted this massive, grandiose work, but you don't just roll out of bed after seven years without a functioning band and go back to doing that".

Corgan and Chamberlin continued to record as a duo, releasing the four-song EP American Gothic in January 2008 and the singles "Superchrist" and "G.L.O.W." later that year. That November, the group released the DVD If All Goes Wrong, which chronicled the group's 2007 concert residences in Asheville, North Carolina and San Francisco, California. In late 2008, the band commenced on a controversy-riddled 20th Anniversary Tour. Around this time, Corgan said the group will make no more full-length records in order to focus exclusively on singles, explaining, "The listening patterns have changed, so why are we killing ourselves to do albums, to create balance, and do the arty track to set up the single? It's done."

=== Teargarden and Oceania: 2009–2013 ===
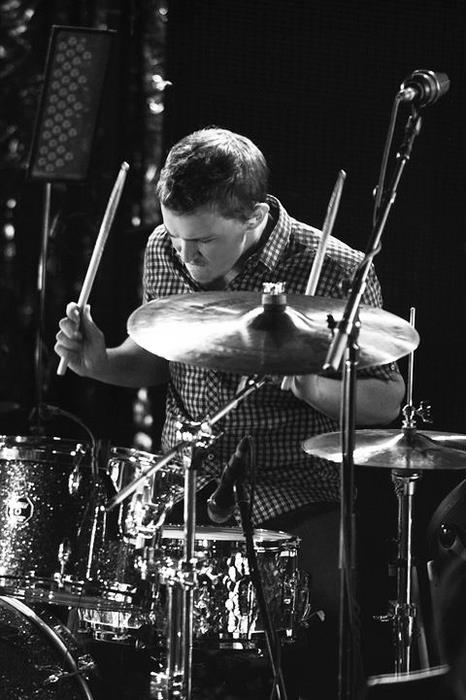
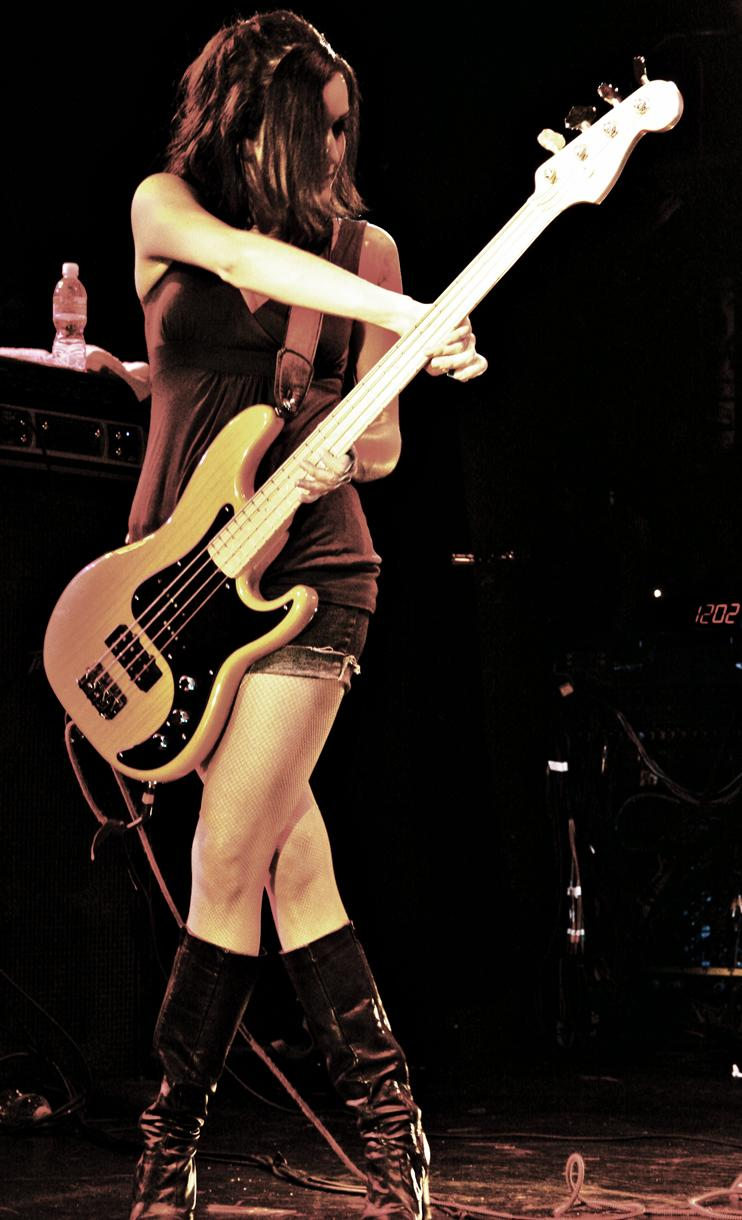
Drummer Mike Byrne and bassist Nicole Fiorentino joined the band in 2009 and 2010 respectively, and both left in 2014

In March 2009 Corgan announced on the band's website that Chamberlin had left the group and would be replaced. Chamberlin subsequently stated that his departure from the band was "a positive move forward for me. I can no longer commit all of my energy into something that I don't fully possess." Chamberlin stressed that the split was amicable, commenting, "I am glad [Corgan] has chosen to continue under the name. It is his right."

Chamberlin soon formed the band Skysaw, which released an album and toured in support of Minus the Bear. In July 2009, Corgan formed a new group called Spirits in the Sky, initially as a tribute band to Sky Saxon of the Seeds, who had recently died. The following month, Corgan confirmed on the band's website that 19-year-old Spirits in the Sky drummer Mike Byrne had replaced Chamberlin and that the pair were working on new Pumpkins recordings.

The group announced plans to release a 44-track concept album, Teargarden by Kaleidyscope, for free over the Internet one track at a time. The first track, "A Song for a Son", was released in December 2009 to moderate press acclaim. In March 2010 Ginger Reyes officially left the band, prompting an open call for auditions for a new bassist. That month also saw the first EP, Vol. 1: Songs for a Sailor, released from the project as a box set. In May, Nicole Fiorentino announced she had joined the band as bass player, and would be working on Teargarden by Kaleidyscope. The new lineup went on a world tour through to the end of 2010. One of the first shows with the new lineup was a concert to benefit Matthew Leone, bassist for the rock band Madina Lake, at the Metro on July 27, 2010. In late 2010 the second EP, Vol. 2: The Solstice Bare, was released as another box set, and all four members contributed to the sessions for the third volume of Teargarden, which was ultimately canceled after the completion of two stand-alone songs.

On April 26, 2011, Corgan announced that the Smashing Pumpkins would be releasing a new album titled Oceania, which he labeled as "an album within an album" in regards to the Teargarden by Kaleidyscope project, in the fall. As with the previous recording sessions, all four band members contributed to the project. Also, the entire album catalog was to be remastered and reissued with bonus tracks, starting with Gish and Siamese Dream in November 2011. The pre-Gish demos, Pisces Iscariot, and Mellon Collie and the Infinite Sadness were released in 2012, with The Aeroplane Flies High released the following year. Adore was released in 2014. Machina/The Machines of God and the yet commercially unreleased Machina II/Friends and Enemies of Modern Music were expected to be combined, remixed, and released in the same year but were not released due to label hang-ups. The band did a thirteen-city US tour in October 2011 followed by a European tour in November and December.

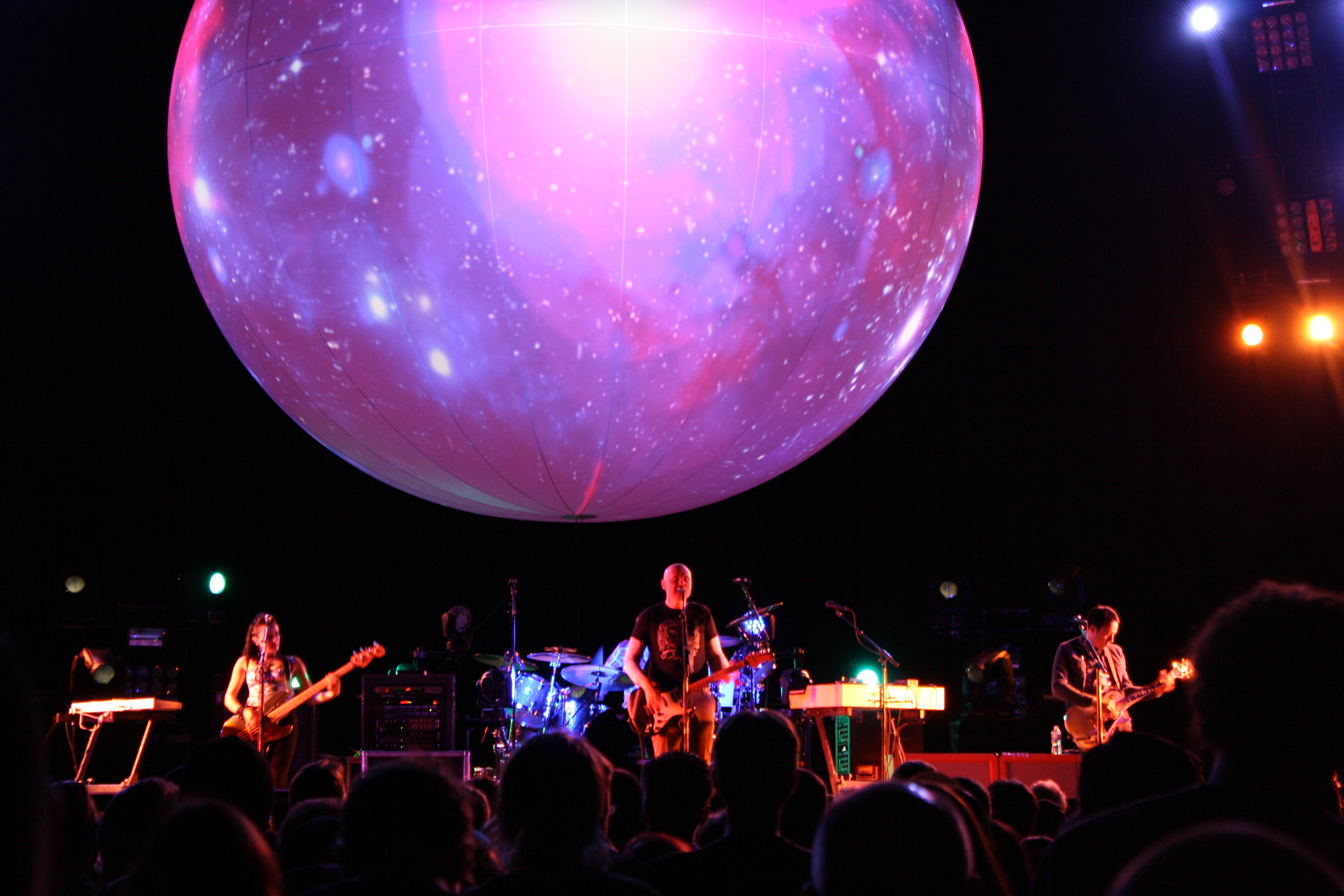
2012 line-up (left to right): Nicole Fiorentino, Billy Corgan, and Jeff Schroeder (Mike Byrne is obscured at the drums) performing at Chaifetz Arena in St Louis, Missouri, on October 18, 2012

Oceania was released on June 19, 2012, and received generally positive reviews. The album debuted at No. 4 on the Billboard 200 and at No. 1 on the Billboard Independent. The album spawned two singles, "The Celestials" and "Panopticon". The band proceeded to tour in support of the album, including a US tour involving playing the album in its entirety. By September 2012, Corgan stated that the band had already begun work on their next album. However, despite this, the band concentrated on touring, playing at Glastonbury Festival, Dour Festival and the Barclays Center, where they recorded Oceania: Live in NYC, which was released on September 24, 2013.

=== Monuments to an Elegy: 2014–2016 ===
On March 25, 2014, Corgan announced he had signed a new record deal with BMG, for two new albums, titled Monuments to an Elegy and Day for Night, respectively. In June, it was revealed that Mike Byrne was no longer in the band, to be replaced by Tommy Lee of Mötley Crüe on the new album, and Fiorentino would not be recording on the album either. Monuments to an Elegy was released on December 5, 2014, to generally positive reviews. The band toured in support of the album starting on November 26, with Rage Against the Machine's Brad Wilk filling in on drums and the Killers' Mark Stoermer filling in on bass. The follow-up proposed album Day For Night was cited for delayed late 2015 or early 2016 release.

Later in 2015 Corgan announced that the band would embark on a co-headlining tour of North America with Marilyn Manson, The End Times Tour, across July and August 2015. Prior to the co-headlining dates, the band performed a series of acoustic shows with drum machines and tapes for percussion. When the time came for the co-headlining tour, plans for a drummer fell through and Corgan recruited Chamberlin to reunite for the shows. On February 25, 2016, Corgan posted a video from a Los Angeles studio on the band's Facebook account, giving an update on the writing process for the new songs for the upcoming album to be released after the In Plainsong tour. The tour began in Portland, Oregon, on March 22, 2016.

=== Iha and Chamberlin's return; Shiny and Oh So Bright and Cyr: 2018–2021 ===
On his birthday on March 26, 2016, original guitarist James Iha joined Billy Corgan, Jimmy Chamberlin, and Jeff Schroeder on stage unannounced at the Ace Hotel in downtown Los Angeles. He performed a few songs, including "Mayonaise", "Soma" and "Today" marking his first appearance with the Smashing Pumpkins in 16 years. Iha also played at the second of the two Smashing Pumpkins shows at the Ace Hotel the following day, which was Easter Sunday. Iha joined the Pumpkins for a third time at their concert of April 14 at the Civic Opera House in Chicago. In July, Corgan began hinting of the possibility of reuniting the band original lineup, of himself, Iha, Wretzky, and Chamberlin, and in August, he stated he had begun reaching out to the original lineup about the feasibility of a reunion, including speaking to Wretzky for the first time in sixteen years. Despite the comments, Corgan would spend much of 2017 working on solo material—recording and releasing the solo album Ogilala and beginning work on another solo album for 2018. In June 2017 Chamberlin also mentioned the possibility of a reunion tour in 2018. In January 2018 Corgan shared a photo of himself, Iha, and Chamberlin together in recording studio. In February 2018 Corgan announced that he was working with music producer Rick Rubin on a future Smashing Pumpkins album, that there were currently 26 songs he was actively working on, and that "the guitar feels once again like the preferred weapon of choice." Soon afterwards, Corgan shared a photo of sound equipment with Iha's name on a label, as well as announcing recording was finished on the album.

On February 15, 2018, founding members Iha and Chamberlin rejoined the band. They embarked on the Shiny And Oh So Bright Tour starting in July, with a focus on performing material from their first five studio albums. and sold over 350,000 tickets and sold-out arenas including The Forum, United Center, and Madison Square Garden. Original bassist D'arcy Wretzky claimed she had been offered a contract to rejoin the band but Corgan rescinded the offer soon after. Corgan released a statement denying the claims, stating "Ms. Wretzky has repeatedly been invited out to play with the group, participate in demo sessions, or at the very least, meet face-to-face, and in each and every instance she always deferred". Jack Bates (son of Joy Division bassist Peter Hook) played bass on the tour. Bates previously toured with the Smashing Pumpkins in 2015. Multi-instrumentalist Katie Cole rejoined the band for the tour as well, singing backup vocals and playing keyboards and guitar.

In March 2018, Corgan mentioned the band planned to release two EPs in 2018, with the first tentatively planned for May. On June 8, 2018, the first single from the set of music, "Solara", was released. On August 2, 2018, the band celebrated their 30th anniversary by performing in Holmdel, New Jersey. with several notable special guests including Courtney Love, Chino Moreno, Davey Havok, Peter Hook, Mark McGrath, and Dave Keuning and Mark Stoermer of the Killers. In September 2018, they announced the album Shiny and Oh So Bright, Vol. 1 / LP: No Past. No Future. No Sun., released via Napalm Records on November 16, 2018, which debuted at number 54 on the Billboard 200 chart.

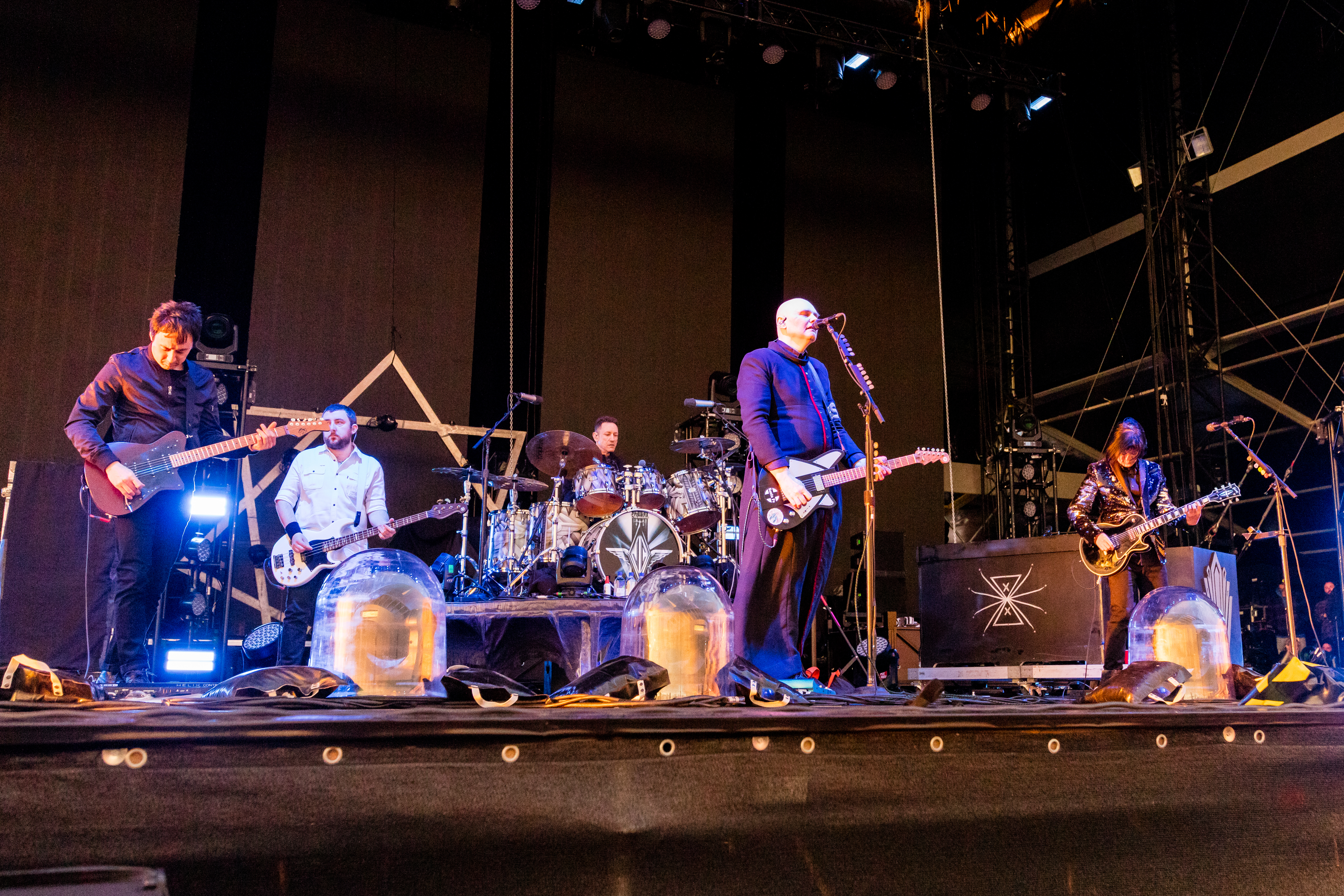
The Smashing Pumpkins performing at Rock am Ring in 2019

After touring through much of 2019, Corgan noted in January 2020 that the band was currently working on 21 songs for a future album release. On August 28, 2020, the band released the single and video for "Cyr", along with a second track titled "The Colour of Love" from their album Cyr, which was released through their new record label Sumerian Records on November 27, 2020. It serves as the second part of the Shiny and Oh So Bright series. On September 25, 2020, the band released another single from Cyr that included the songs "Confessions of a Dopamine Addict" and "Wrath". On October 9, 2020, the band released a third single for Cyr that featured the tracks "Anno Satana" and "Birch Grove". On October 29, the band released "Ramona" and "Wyttch" as the fourth pair of singles. On November 20, 2020, the songs "Purple Blood" and "Dulcet in E" were released as the fifth and final single for Cyr. The following week, on November 27, 2020, the band released Cyr.

=== Atum: A Rock Opera in Three Acts and Aghori Mhori Mei: 2022–present ===
In late 2020, Corgan announced that the band had begun work on a double album to serve as a sequel to the overarching story of Mellon Collie and the Infinite Sadness and Machina: The Machines of God. The album was planned for release in 2021, however it was not until September 19, 2022, that the album's title, Atum: A Rock Opera in Three Acts, was revealed. Each act was released on its own, with the dates in order being November 15, 2022, January 31, 2023, and May 5, 2023. All of the acts, along with ten extra songs, were compiled into a vinyl box set that was released the same day as the third grouping of songs. On February 22, 2022, the band announced on social media the Rock Invasion 2 Tour, which had previously been set to take place in spring 2020, postponed to fall 2020, and subsequently canceled due to the COVID-19 pandemic. The newly announced incarnation of the tour had entirely new locations spanning eleven US cities accompanying the band's spring festival appearances, and four performances in Mexico, their first since 2013.

In May 2022, the band announced plans for the Spirits on Fire tour with Jane's Addiction. In November 2022, The World is A Vampire Festival was announced for March 2023. The festival's lineup included Interpol, Turnstile, Peter Hook & The Light, Deafheaven, the Warning, and several others. In February 2023, the band announced that they would be bringing The World Is A Vampire Festival to Australia as a 10-date tour during the month of April. The lineup featured Jane's Addiction, Amyl & The Sniffers, Redhook, and Battlesnake, in addition to the wrestling matches similar to the singular date in Mexico. In between the band's time in Mexico and Australia, they announced on March 28, 2023, that they would bring The World Is A Vampire to the United States and Canada as a summer tour across amphitheaters, indoor theaters, and one arena. The tour featured support from Stone Temple Pilots, Interpol, and Rival Sons, as well as select appearances by Corgan's National Wrestling Alliance (NWA) wrestlers along with tapings for NWA Powerrr.

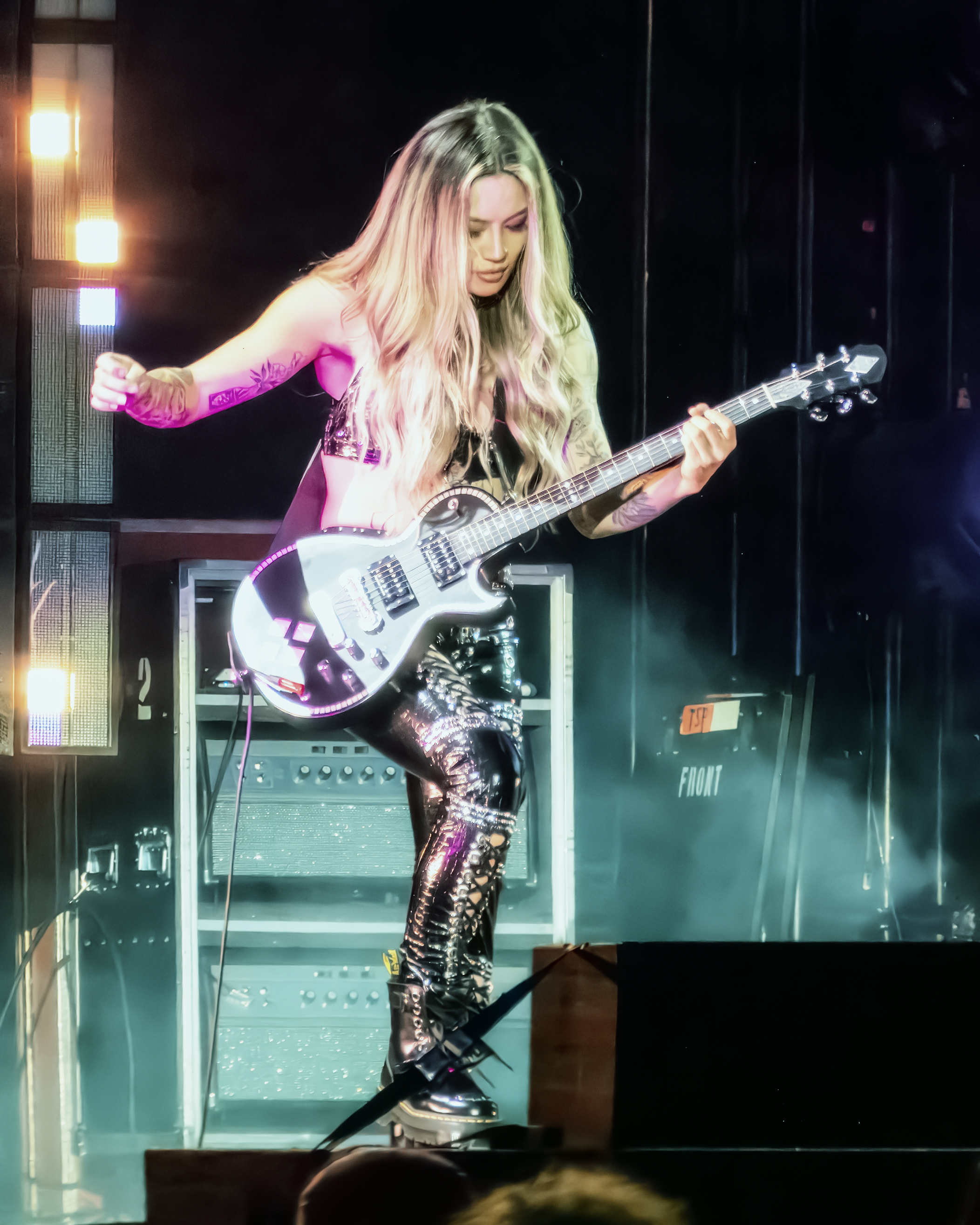
Kiki Wong with the Smashing Pumpkins, part of the Saviors Tour with Green Day in 2024

On October 19, 2023, Green Day played a small club show and handed out physical flyers that revealed in 2024 they would be touring the United States and Canada in stadiums with the Smashing Pumpkins, Rancid, and the Linda Lindas. This tour was officially announced by all four bands on November 2, 2023, as the Saviors Tour. On October 24, 2023, it was announced in a statement posted on the band's social media that longtime guitarist Jeff Schroeder had decided to leave the band "to explore a slightly different path".

Following Schroeder's departure, on January 5, 2024, the Smashing Pumpkins announced via their social media channels that they were accepting applications via email for an additional guitarist. By January 17, the band had received over 10,000 submissions and employed eight people full-time to review each one. On April 26, the band announced that they had chosen Kiki Wong as their new touring guitarist, with Billy Corgan noting that he was a fan of hers "before she submitted her name to be considered."

In June 2024, the Smashing Pumpkins performed a six-city tour of the United Kingdom and Ireland, which they co-headlined with Weezer. That same month, Corgan stated that the band had been spending the last two years working on a guitar-driven new studio album, partially in response to the negative reception of the emphasis of synthesizers on the Atum releases. The following month, the band announced their thirteenth album, Aghori Mhori Mei, would be released on August 2. The album would be released digitally first, before physical editions followed later. An outtake, "Chrome Jets", was released as a standalone single in September 2025.

On June 27, 2025, it was announced that a reissue of the band's Machina album would be taking place. A fully remastered version of Machina/The Machines of God was released on August 22, 2025, on physical formats and streaming. In October, the band released Machina: Aranea Alba Editio, a comprehensive box set which contains 80 songs across eight records. The reworked concept album mirrored the band's original vision of the release and brought together the material from the Machina and Machina II sessions resequenced into 48 songs, along with 32 additional bonus tracks consisting of demos, outtakes, and live tracks.

In November 2025, Zodeon at Crystal Hall, an album of Atum bonus tracks, was released on vinyl with a newly curated sequencing, along with three additional tracks.

In May 2026, the band announced The Rats in a Cage Tour, a North American arena tour running September through November 2026 to commemorate the 30th anniversary of Mellon Collie and the Infinite Sadness.

== Musical style, influences, and legacy ==
"Cherub Rock"
Sample of "Cherub Rock" from Siamese Dream (1993). This song featured many layers of guitar tracks and the famous "Pumpkin chord".

"1979"
Sample of "1979", the second single from Mellon Collie and the Infinite Sadness (1995). The band's biggest hit and a precursor to their change in style, featuring a drum machine accompaniment to Chamberlin's drums and sampled vocal effects.

The Smashing Pumpkins' music has explored alternative rock, grunge, psychedelic rock, heavy metal, shoegaze, synth-pop, art rock, electronic rock, gothic rock, dream pop, psychedelia, college rock, punk rock, and progressive rock. According to drummer Jimmy Chamberlin, when the Smashing Pumpkins first formed, each member had their own set of influences, few of which were shared by the whole band:

At the beginning, [there were few common influences]. I came from a jazz background, my influences were Tony Williams, Jeff Beck, Return to Forever, Weather Report. Billy was very much into Joy Division, New Order, Bauhaus, but also was a closet Mahavishnu fan, and really liked that Yngwie Malmsteen stuff, progressive rock. James Iha was really into Johnny Marr, and D'arcy had her own trip as well.

Since those early days, the direction of the Smashing Pumpkins has been dominated by lead guitarist, lead vocalist, keyboardist, bassist and primary songwriter Billy Corgan, who has been the band's sole constant member since its inception. Journalist Greg Kot wrote, "The music [of the Smashing Pumpkins] would not be what it is without his ambition and vision, and his famously fractured relationships with his family, friends, and bandmembers." Melissa Auf der Maur commented upon news of the group's reunion, "Everyone knows Billy doesn't need too many people to make a Pumpkins record, other than Jimmy [Chamberlin]—who he has on board." In a 2015 interview, Corgan himself referred to the current iteration of the band as "sort of an open source collective", noting that "[i]t's whoever feels right at the time." Many of Corgan's lyrics for the Pumpkins are cathartic expressions of emotion, full of personal musings and strong indictments of himself and those close to him. Music critics were not often fans of Corgan's angst-filled lyrics. Jim DeRogatis wrote in a 1993 Chicago Sun-Times article that Corgan's lyrics "too often sound like sophomoric poetry", although he viewed the lyrics of later albums Adore and Machina as an improvement. The band's songs have been described as "anguished, bruised reports from Billy Corgan's nightmare-land" by journalist William Shaw.

The band's distinctive sound up until Adore involved layering numerous guitar tracks onto a song during the recording process, a tactic that Mellon Collie and the Infinite Sadness co-producer Flood called the "Pumpkin guitar overdub army." Although there were a lot of overdubbed parts on Gish, Corgan began to really explore the possibilities of overdubbing with Siamese Dream; Corgan has stated that "Soma" alone contains up to 40 overdubbed guitar parts. While Corgan knew many of the songs would be difficult or impossible to replicate from their recorded versions in concert (in fact, some songs were drastically altered for live performance), he has explained the use of overdubbing by posing the question "When you are faced with making a permanent recorded representation of a song, why not endow it with the grandest possible vision?" This use of multilayered sounds was inspired by Corgan's love of 1970s popular artists and bands such as David Bowie, Cheap Trick, Queen, Boston, and the Electric Light Orchestra, as well as shoegaze, a British alternative rock style of the late 1980s and early 1990s that relied on swirling layers of guitar noise for effect. Mellon Collie coproducer Alan Moulder was originally hired to mix Siamese Dream because Corgan was a fan of his work producing shoegaze bands such as My Bloody Valentine, Ride, and Slowdive.

Like many contemporary alternative bands, the Smashing Pumpkins utilized shifts in song dynamics, going from quiet to loud and vice versa. Hüsker Dü's seminal album Zen Arcade demonstrated to the band how they could place gentler material against more aggressive fare, and Corgan made such shifts in dynamics central to the pursuit of his grand musical ambitions. Corgan said he liked the idea of creating his own alternative universe through sound that essentially tells the listener, "Welcome to Pumpkin Land, this is what it sounds like on Planet Pumpkin." This emphasis on atmosphere carried through to Adore (described as "arcane night music" in prerelease promotion) and the Machina albums (concept records that tell the story of a fictional rock band).

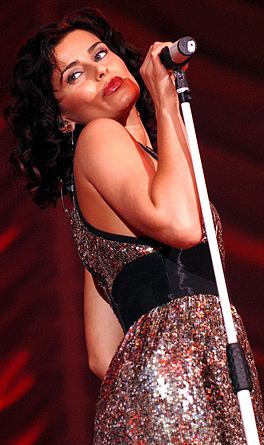
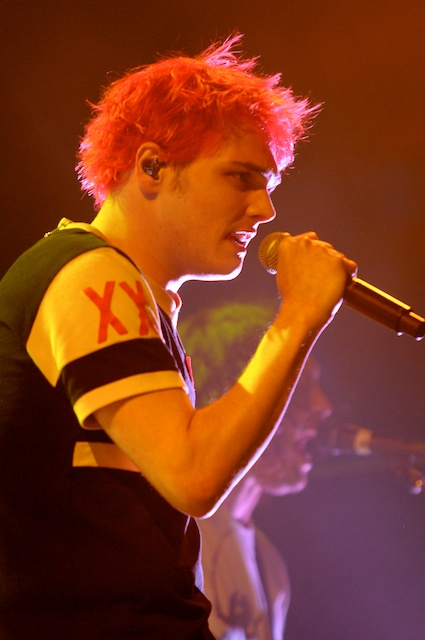
Musicians Nelly Furtado (left) and Gerard Way (right) are influenced by the Pumpkins' material.

The Pumpkins drew inspiration from a variety of other genres, some unfashionable during the 1990s among music critics. Corgan in particular was open about his appreciation of heavy metal, citing Dimebag Darrell of Pantera as his favorite contemporary guitarist. When one interviewer commented to Corgan and Iha that "Smashing Pumpkins is one of the groups that relegitimized heavy metal" and that they "were among the first alternative rockers to mention people like Ozzy and Black Sabbath with anything other than contempt", Corgan went on to rave about Black Sabbath's Master of Reality and Judas Priest's Unleashed in the East. The song "Zero", which reminded Iha of Judas Priest, is an example of what the band dubbed "cybermetal". Other bands Corgan cited as influences are Rainbow, Accept, Mercyful Fate, Dokken, Metallica, Slayer and Myrkur.

Post-punk and gothic rock bands like Joy Division/New Order, Bauhaus, the Cure, and Depeche Mode were formative influences on the band, which covered such artists in concert and on record. Corgan also cited Siouxsie and the Banshees saying it was important to point back to bands that influenced them. Psychedelic rock was also referenced often in the band's early recordings; according to Corgan, "In typical Pumpkins fashion, no one at that point really liked loud guitars or psychedelic music so, of course, that's exactly what we had to do." Corgan felt that the band's guitars "are a mixture of heavy metal and 80s alternative rock. I think of Cure and Siouxsie and the Banshees". Corgan acknowledged that a chord he jokingly claimed as "the Pumpkin chord" (a G# octave chord at the eleventh fret of a guitar with the low E string played under it), used as the basis for "Cherub Rock", "Drown", and other songs, was in fact previously used by Jimi Hendrix. Other early influences cited by Corgan include Cream, the Stooges, and Blue Cheer.

Regarding the band's influence upon other groups, Greg Kot wrote in 2001, "Whereas Nirvana spawned countless mini-Nirvanas, the Pumpkins remain an island unto themselves." Still, several artists and bands have considered the Pumpkins as an influence, such as Nelly Furtado, Marilyn Manson, Deftones, Evanescence, Third Eye Blind, Mark Hoppus of Blink-182, Tegan and Sara, Fall Out Boy, Rivers Cuomo, M83, Panic! at the Disco, Silversun Pickups, Vision Eternel, My Chemical Romance, and Code Orange. My Chemical Romance vocalist Gerard Way has said that they pattern their career upon the Pumpkins', including music videos. The members of fellow Chicago band Kill Hannah are friends with Corgan, and lead singer Mat Devine has compared his group to the Pumpkins.

The group has sold over 30 million albums worldwide as of October 2012, and sales in the United States alone reaching 19.75 million. Siamese Dream and Mellon Collie and the Infinite Sadness have both appeared in Rolling Stone magazine's list of the 500 Greatest Albums of All Time. On July 24, 2026, the Hollywood Walk of Fame announced that the band will receive a star in the Class of 2027.

== Music videos ==
Drawing heavy influence from Georges Méliès's A Trip to the Moon, the video for "Tonight, Tonight" was filmed in the style of a turn-of-the-century silent film using theater-style backdrops and primitive special effects.

The Smashing Pumpkins have been praised as "responsible for some of the most striking and memorable video clips" and for having "approached videos from a completely artistic standpoint rather than mere commercials to sell albums". MTV's 2001 anniversary special Testimony: 20 Years of Rock on MTV credited the Pumpkins, along with Nine Inch Nails, with treating music videos as an art form during the 1990s. Corgan has said, "We generally resisted the idea of what I call the classic MTV rock video, which is like lots of people jumping around and stuff." The band worked with video directors including Kevin Kerslake ("Cherub Rock"), Samuel Bayer ("Bullet with Butterfly Wings"), and, most frequently, the team of Jonathan Dayton and Valerie Faris ("Rocket", "1979", "Tonight, Tonight", "The End Is the Beginning Is the End", and "Perfect"). Corgan, who was frequently heavily involved in the conception of the videos, said of Dayton and Faris, "I know my [initial] versions are always darker, and they're always talking me into something a little kinder and gentler." Videos like "Today", "Rocket", and "1979" dealt with images taken from middle American culture, albeit exaggerated. The group's videos so often avoid the literal interpretation of the song lyrics that the video for "Thirty-Three", with images closely related to the words of the song, was created as an intentional stylistic departure.

The band was nominated for several MTV Video Music Awards during the 1990s. In 1996, the group won eight VMAs total for the "1979" and "Tonight, Tonight" videos, including the top award, Video of the Year, for "Tonight, Tonight". The video was also nominated for a Grammy at the 1997 ceremony. Of the "Tonight, Tonight" video, Corgan remarked, "I don't think we've ever had people react [like this]... it just seemed to touch a nerve."

Shortly after the band's 2000 breakup, the Greatest Hits Video Collection was released, collecting the band's music videos from 1991 to 2000 and including commentary from Corgan, Iha, Chamberlin, Wretzky, and various music video directors with outtakes, live performances, and the extended "Try, Try, Try" short film.

== Band members ==
Current

- Billy Corgan – lead vocals, guitar, keyboards, bass (1988–2000, 2006–present)
- James Iha – guitar, bass, backing and occasional lead vocals (1988–2000, 2018–present)
- Jimmy Chamberlin – drums (1988–1996, 1999–2000, 2006–2009, 2015–present)

Current touring musicians

- Jack Bates – bass (2015–present)
- Kiki Wong – guitar (2024–present)

Former

- D'arcy Wretzky – bass, backing and occasional lead vocals (1988–1999)
- Melissa Auf der Maur – bass, backing vocals (1999–2000)
- Mike Byrne – drums, backing vocals, keyboards (2009–2014)
- Nicole Fiorentino – bass, backing vocals, keyboards (2010–2014)
- Jeff Schroeder – guitar, backing vocals, keyboards (2006–2023)

== Awards ==
American Music Awards

- 1997 – Best Alternative Artist

Grammy Awards

- 1997 – "Bullet with Butterfly Wings" – Best Hard Rock Performance
- 1998 – "The End Is the Beginning Is the End" – Best Hard Rock Performance

MTV Europe Music Awards

- 1996 – Best Rock

MTV Video Music Awards

- 1996 – "Tonight, Tonight" – Video of the Year, Breakthrough Video, Best Direction, Best Visual Effects, Best Art Direction, Best Cinematography
- 1996 – "1979" – Best Alternative Video

== Discography ==
=== Studio albums ===
- Gish (1991)
- Siamese Dream (1993)
- Mellon Collie and the Infinite Sadness (1995)
- Adore (1998)
- Machina/The Machines of God (2000)†
- Machina II/The Friends & Enemies of Modern Music (2000)†
- Zeitgeist (2007)
- Oceania (2012)‡
- Monuments to an Elegy (2014)‡
- Shiny and Oh So Bright, Vol. 1 / LP: No Past. No Future. No Sun. (2018)
- Cyr (2020)
- Atum: A Rock Opera in Three Acts (2022–2023)
- Aghori Mhori Mei (2024)

=== Notes ===
† Reworked as Machina: Aranea Alba Editio (2025), a box set combining and restructuring both Machina albums into a single album with additional tracks.

‡ Part of Teargarden by Kaleidyscope (2009–2014), an overarching project abandoned before completion.

== See also ==
- List of artists who reached number one on the US alternative rock chart

== Bibliography ==
- Azerrad, Michael (October 14, 1993). "Smashing Pumpkins' Sudden Impact". Rolling Stone. No. 667. p. 19.
- DeRogatis, Jim (2003). Milk It!: Collected Musings on the Alternative Music Explosion of the 90's. Da Capo. ISBN 978-0306812712.
- Erlewine, Stephen Thomas. "Biography". Allmusic. Archived from the original on February 25, 2016.
- Kot, Greg (January 2002). "Pumpkin Seeds". Guitar World.
