= The Parable (album) =

Jimmy Chamberlin Complex album

Studio album by Jimmy Chamberlin Complex
- Released: November 6, 2017
- Recorded: 2017
- Genre: Jazz fusion
- Length: 36:09
- Label: Make Records
- Producer: Billy Mohler

Jimmy Chamberlin Complex chronology
Life Begins Again (2005)	The Parable (2017)

The Parable is the second studio album by the Jimmy Chamberlin Complex (side project band of The Smashing Pumpkins/Zwan drummer Jimmy Chamberlin). It was released on November 6, 2017 as a digital download, and the physical edition was released 2 weeks after the digital download's release. This is the first album since the 2005 debut, Life Begins Again. The album was produced by Chamberlin's longtime collaborator, Billy Mohler.

== Track listing ==
All songs were written by Jimmy Chamberlin

1. Horus and the Pharaoh – 6:19
2. The Parable – 6:50
3. Thoughts of Days Long Past – 4:17
4. El Born – 6:12
5. Magick Moon – 4:52
6. Dance of the Grebe – 7:40

== Personnel ==
- Jimmy Chamberlin – drums, percussion
- Billy Mohler – bass guitar, production
- Chris Speed – clarinet, saxophone
- Sean Woolstenhulme – guitar
- Randy Ingram – keyboard
- Husky Hoskulds – engineering
- Nate Wood – mastering
