= Billy Mohler =

American musician

- Billy Mohler (photo by Robbie Jeffers)

Billy Mohler is a Grammy-nominated producer, songwriter, and multi-instrumentalist. He was raised in South Orange County and is Bill Medley's (of the Righteous Bros.) godson. He attended and graduated from Berklee College of Music where he studied electric bass and acoustic bass. Mohler then received a full scholarship to the prestigious Thelonious Monk Institute of Jazz at UCLA. He was a member of the rock band The Calling until 2002. The band's debut record Camino Palmero has sold more than 5 million copies worldwide.

He is currently a member of the Jimmy Chamberlin Complex, and is a good friend of Chamberlin. The two first met when Mohler auditioned for Zwan, Chamberlin's former band. Mohler and Chamberlin became quick friends. It was Mohler who Chamberlin called first after securing a record deal with Sanctuary Records. Mohler contributed greatly to the band's first album (Life Begins Again), co-writing and co-producing it with Chamberlin, playing bass guitar, bass, electric guitar and keyboards throughout, and singing in "Streetcrawler" and "Newerwaves". With the Jimmy Chamberlin Complex, Mohler has co-produced and co-written three albums including the groups most recent 2020 album Honor.

Mohler's recording/songwriting/production credits are diverse. He has recorded with Lady Gaga, Sia, Awolnation (13 times platinum) Dolly Parton (Dumplin Soundtrack), Miley Cyrus, Katy Perry, Linda Perry, Natasha Bedingfield, Nile Rodgers, Chic, Dorothy, Pat Benatar, Little Big Town, Maren Morris, Mavis Staples, Miranda Lambert, Alison Krauss, Elle King, Kacey Musgraves, Pom Pom's, Aimee Osbourne, The Airborne Toxic Event, Conway, Limp Bizkit, Liz Phair, Kelly Clarkson, Macy Gray, The Calling, Lifehouse, and Debi Nova. Mohler has produced/written with Awolnation (recently went 6 times platinum), Gustavo Galindo (Grammy Nomination for Best Latin Pop Rock Album 2011), War Tapes, The Drowning Men, Last American Buffalo, Carina Round, Katy Rose, Lenka, The Bellrays, Bill Madden, Shane Alexander, Trevor Menear and many others. Mohler performed with Jon Brion on the Charlie Kaufman film Synecdoche, New York. Mohler recently co-wrote music for John Krasinski's directorial debut film, Brief Interviews with Hideous Men.

For a brief period in 2006, Mohler worked with The Smashing Pumpkins in Los Angeles, CA.

Mohler also plays drums in a band called War Tapes who have opened for the Smashing Pumpkins, Tiger Army, VNV Nation, Shiny Toy Guns, Moving Units and toured in the UK and the West Coast with The Bravery. War Tapes are signed to Sarathan Records in Seattle, WA and recently completed a US tour with VNV Nation as well as releasing their first full length, The Continental Divide. The band released an EP in 2020 entitled Only Time Will Tell featuring five new songs.

Mohler's performance credits are equally diverse including Macy Gray, Lee "Scratch" Perry, Herbie Hancock, Wayne Shorter, Jimmy Heath, Clark Terry, Terence Blanchard, Lenka, Billy Childs, Awolnation, Steven Tyler, Meiko, and he was a member of the band Anarchy Orchestra, formed in part by legendary skater Tony Hawk. While at Berklee, Mohler was a member of The Jay Hodgson Group, which also included violinist Ludvig Girdland, drummer Rohin Khemani and lead-singer and songwriter Jay Hodgson; Girdland would go on to become an important session violinist in Los Angeles, working with the likes of Electric Light Orchestra and Eels, among others. He recorded on their debut album, which topped collegeweb.com's national 'indie' chart for more than three months in 1998.

Mohler performed on bass at the 61st Grammy Awards alongside Dolly Parton, Katy Perry, Kacey Musgraves, Maren Morris, Little Big Town, Linda Perry, and Miley Cyrus.

Mohler released his debut album in 2019 called Focus featuring Nate Wood on drums, Shane Endsley on trumpet, and Chris Speed on Tenor Saxophone. Mohler's album was featured in Jazziz Magazine.

Mohler has worked on ad campaigns for Tom Ford (Lady Gaga, Nile Rodgers), Swovski Diamonds (Daya), Tommy Hilfiger, CSX Trains, AT&T, Finlandia Vodka, and many others.

In 2020, Mohler contributed upright bass to CBS's show The Stand. Mohler was also featured in Bass Player Magazines Artist Spotlight.

Mohler currently plays Fender Basses, Moollon Basses, Hofner Basses, Ashdown Engineering amplification, Noble Di and D'Addario strings.
