= The Continental Divide (album) =

Studio album by War Tapes
- Released: 2009
- Genres: Post-punk, doom pop
- Label: Sarathan Records

The Continental Divide is the debut album from American rock band War Tapes. It was written and recorded from 2008 to early 2009 in Los Angeles, and released on May 26, 2009, on Sarathan Records.

== Recording and critical reception ==
The album was recorded during 2008 and 2009 in Los Angeles. During that time, the band released an E.P. of seven songs, four of which would end up on The Continental Divide. Those songs: "Dreaming of You", "Start Again", "She Lied" and "Mind Is Ugly" were remastered for the new album. Most of the writing and recording of the album was done at Regime Studios, with the band's drummer William Mohler serving as producer.

Since the album's release, it's received very positive reviews from numerous sites, some of which include: Ripplemusic, Indiemusicnews, Indieblips, Shakefire.com. However, not all of the reviews for the album have been completely positive. Adequacy.net, in their review of the album stated: "The Continental Divide isn’t likely to bowl you over with its diversity; in fact, things feel downright redundant sometimes, particular with the barn burners – but you can’t fault War Tapes for their impassioned drive and resolve." while Popmatters.com has stated: "Nothing about this collection of songs is particularly fresh, but it’s well put-together."

== Track listing ==
1. The Night Unfolds - 2:51
2. Dreaming Of You - 4:31
3. She Lied - 3:22
4. Start Again - 4:24
5. Use Me - 3:36
6. All The World's A Stage - 4:46
7. Mind Is Ugly - 3:34
8. Rightfully Mine - 4:53
9. Air Filled Romance - 4:00
10. For Eternity - 3:43
11. Fast Lane - 6:21
12. Shane (hidden track) - 3:37

== Personnel ==
- Neil Popkin - Vocals, Guitar
- Becca Popkin - Bass, Vocals, Piano on "Shane"
- Matthew Bennet - Guitars
- William Mohler - Drums

== Miscellanea ==
- The iTunes release of The Continental Divide includes the track "Supposed Human" as an 'album only' download. This song has yet to see a physical release.
- The Album cover is an edited picture taken by the band's bassist Becca Popkin while driving across the American Midwest.
- In keeping with all of War Tapes physical releases thus far, the case for the album is made of recycled materials, and is not a standard or slimline jewel case, as most CDs come in.

== Usage in media ==
- "Dreaming Of You" and "The Night Unfolds" were used on Last Call with Carson Daly, during the 2008-2009 New Year's Special
- "Mind Is Ugly" was used in the MTV Series The Hills, in the season 5 episode "Playmates Bring The Drama"
- "Dreaming of You" and "Always Falling" (from their debut EP) were used in the ABC Family television show GREEK, for the Season 2 Finale At World's End. The Band appeared as themselves and performed the songs on the episode.
- Rightfully Mine” was played on Animal Planet’s “Jockeys” and included in a short documentary entitled: “Formula Drift Driver Joon Maeng"
