= Honestly (Zwan song) =

Single by Zwan

from the album Mary Star of the Sea
- Released: 2002 (promo only); February 24, 2003 (UK commercial release)
- Length: 3:47
- Label: Reprise
- Songwriter: Billy Corgan
- Producers: Billy Corgan, Bjorn Thorsrud

Zwan singles chronology
"Honestly" (2002)	"Lyric" (2003)

"Honestly" is a song by American alternative rock group Zwan. It was the first single from their album Mary Star of the Sea and was written by Billy Corgan.

The song was used for the ending of the 2023 video game Hi-Fi Rush by Tango Gameworks. The B-side – an acoustic cover of "The Number of the Beast" by the heavy metal band Iron Maiden – was used in the opening credits of the 2002 film Spun by director Jonas Åkerlund.

== Content ==
"Honestly" is a rock song in the key of D major. Musically, it bears some similarities to the chord progression of Corgan compositions "Today" and the chorus of "Cherub Rock". The guitar parts mostly use a flanger effect.

== Track listing ==
All tracks are written by Billy Corgan, except where noted.

No.	Title	Writer(s)	Length
1.	"Honestly"		3:47
2.	"The Number of the Beast"	Steve Harris	4:18
3.	"Freedom Ain't What It Used to Be"		4:05

== Personnel ==
- Linda Strawberry – additional singing and piano

== Charts ==
Chart (2003)	Peak position
Australia (ARIA)	26
Canada (Nielsen SoundScan)	17
Germany (GfK)	86
Ireland (IRMA)	42
Italy (FIMI)	18
Netherlands (Single Top 100)	92
Sweden (Sverigetopplistan)	35
UK Singles (Official Charts)	28
US Bubbling Under Hot 100 (Billboard)	3
US Alternative Airplay (Billboard)	7
US Mainstream Rock Airplay (Billboard)	21
