= Blinking with Fists =

Book by Billy Corgan

- Author: Billy Corgan
- Cover artist: Yelena Yemchuk
- Language: English
- Genre: Poetry
- Publisher: Faber and Faber
- Publication date: 2004
- Publication place: United States
- Media type: Print (Hardback & Paperback)
- Pages: 84 pp (hardback edition)
- ISBN: 0-571-21189-5 (hardback edition)
- OCLC: 54881947
- Dewey Decimal: 811/.6 22
- LC Class: PS3603.O7344 B55 2004

Blinking with Fists is the debut book of poetry by The Smashing Pumpkins and former Zwan frontman, Billy Corgan. The progress and writing of the poems was covered in Corgan's blogs. The Volume of 57 poems was published by Faber and Faber in 2004 and received mixed reviews. Dwight Garner (critic) of The New York Times wrote that "at its best, Blinking With Fists is vivid and angular and not much worse than many first books of poems that arrive with heady praise from the poetry world's burghers." Entertainment Weekly gave the effort a "D," calling the poems "both pretentious and confoundingly esoteric." The book peaked at #24 on the New York Times Best Seller list.

The jacket of the book was designed by Charlotte Strick and the artwork and author photograph are by Yelena Yemchuk, who was involved with artwork for The Smashing Pumpkins. Interior design is by Gretchen Achilles.
