= Amarinthe =

Amarinthe may refer to:

- Amarinthe, character from The Princess (W. S. Gilbert play)
- "Amarinthe", song by Billy Corgan from Ogilala

== See also ==
- Amaranthe
