= Life Begins Again =

Album by Jimmy Chamberlin

Studio album by Jimmy Chamberlin Complex
- Released: January 25, 2005
- Recorded: 22–29 June 2004
- Genre: Jazz fusion, alternative rock
- Length: 43:35
- Label: Sanctuary
- Producer: Jimmy Chamberlin

Jimmy Chamberlin Complex chronology
Life Begins Again (2005)	The Parable (2017)

Professional ratings
Review scores
Source	Rating
Allmusic	3.5/5 stars
Alternative Addiction	2.5/5 stars
Gaffa	2/6
Gigwise	3.5/5 stars
The Guardian	1/5 stars
Houston Chronicle	4/5 stars
Plattentests.de	4/10
Rolling Stone	3/5 stars
Soundi	3/5 stars
Soundvenue	3/6
Visions	6/12
Voir	2.5/5 stars

Life Begins Again is the debut studio album by the Jimmy Chamberlin Complex, led by drummer Jimmy Chamberlin of The Smashing Pumpkins and Zwan. It was released on January 25, 2005 and as an Enhanced CD. The album features several guest musicians and vocalists including Billy Corgan (Smashing Pumpkins), Bill Medley (The Righteous Brothers), and Rob Dickinson (Catherine Wheel).

== Track listing ==
All songs were written by Jimmy Chamberlin and Billy Mohler, except where noted.

1. "Streetcrawler" (Chamberlin, Mohler, Sean Woolstenhulme) – 4:05
2. "Life Begins Again" – 3:44
  - Features Rob Dickinson on vocals
3. "P.S.A." (Chamberlin, Mohler, Woolstenhulme) – 5:46
4. "Loki Cat" (Chamberlin, Mohler, Woolstenhulme) – 4:09
  - Features Billy Corgan on vocals
5. "Cranes of Prey" – 5:18
6. "Love Is Real" – 3:22
  - Features Rob Dickinson on vocals
7. "Owed to Darryl" (Chamberlin, Mohler, Woolstenhulme) – 5:14
8. "Newerwaves" – 4:13
9. "Time Shift" – 2:43
10. "Lullabye" – 3:45
  - Features Bill Medley on vocals
  - Lyrics by Becca Popkin
11. "Loki Cat (Reprise)" (Chamberlin, Mohler, Woolstenhulme) – 1:11

== Personnel ==
- Jimmy Chamberlin – drums, producer, writer
- Billy Mohler – bass, keyboards, guitar, writer, vocals on "Streetcrawler" and "Newerwaves"
- Sean Woolstenhulme – guitar, writer
- Adam Benjamin – Fender Rhodes
- Paul Chamberlin – additional drums on "Loki Cat"
- Corey Wilton – lead guitar on "Love Is Real", additional guitar on "Time Shift", art concept
- Linda Strawberry – backing vocals on "Lullabye"
- Tom Rothrock – mixer
- Mike Tarantino – assistant to Tom Rothrock
- Edmund Monsef – engineer
- Forrest Borie – video content production and editing
- Frank Gironda – management
