= Jimmy Chamberlin =

American drummer and record producer

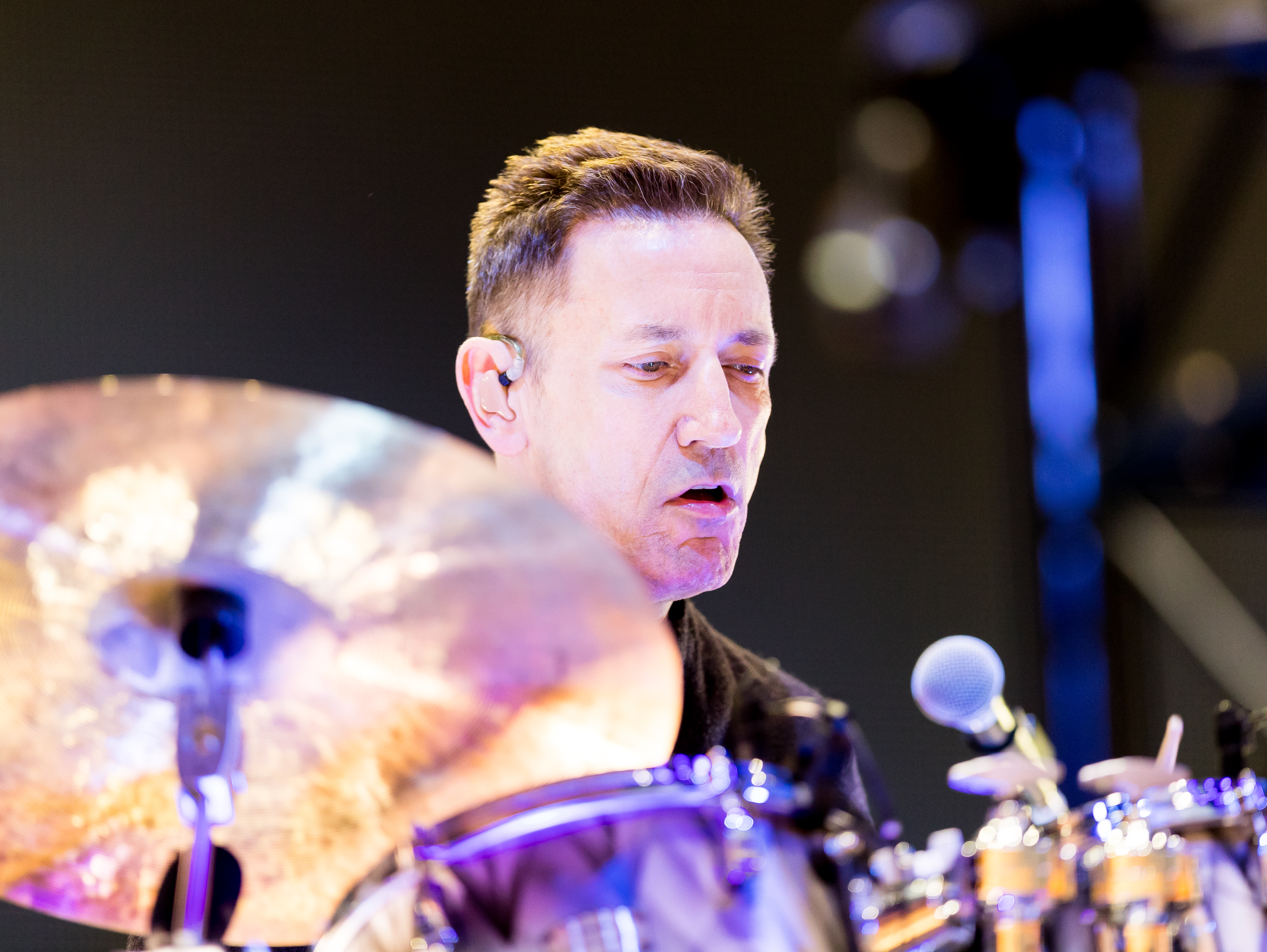
- Chamberlin performing with the Smashing Pumpkins in 2019

Background information
- Born: James Joseph Chamberlin; June 10, 1964 (age 62); Joliet, Illinois, U.S.
- Genres: Alternative rock, jazz fusion
- Occupations: CEO (LiveOne), drummer, record producer
- Instruments: Drums, percussion
- Years active: 1980–present
- Labels: Caroline, Virgin, Reprise, Sanctuary, TVT, Spitfire
- Member of: The Smashing Pumpkins
- Formerly of: Zwan

James Joseph Chamberlin (born June 10, 1964) is an American drummer and record producer. He is best known as the drummer for the alternative rock band the Smashing Pumpkins. Following the 2000 breakup of the band, Chamberlin joined Pumpkins frontman Billy Corgan in the supergroup Zwan and also formed his own current solo project, the Jimmy Chamberlin Complex.

In late 2005, Chamberlin joined Corgan in reforming Smashing Pumpkins; he eventually left the group in August 2009, though he returned again in 2015 for a summer tour, and has officially performed with the band since then. Following guitarist Jeff Schroeder's departure in October 2023, Chamberlin is the band's second-longest serving member behind Corgan, having served the group across four separate stints. He also performed in the group Skysaw until 2012 and joined Chicago jazz saxophonist Frank Catalano for a string of 2013–15 performances in the Chicago area. An EP by Catalano and Chamberlin Love Supreme Collective was released in 2014.

Chamberlin originally trained as a jazz drummer and cites jazz musicians Benny Goodman, Duke Ellington, Gene Krupa, and Buddy Rich, as well as rock drummers Keith Moon, Ian Paice, and John Bonham as major influences on his technique. He primarily strives for emotionally communicative playing. In 2008, Gigwise named Chamberlin the 5th best drummer of all time. In 2016, Rolling Stone ranked Chamberlin 53rd on their list of "100 Greatest Drummers of All Time".

== Early life and education ==
Chamberlin was born in Joliet, Illinois, one of six children in a Catholic family of English and Hungarian ancestry. His father and his older brother Paul were both active in jazz bands, playing clarinet and drums respectively, and his brother Paul is still an active rock drummer, with a local cover band, Chasing Amy.

Chamberlin began drumming at age nine. His early instruction included Latin, Brazilian, and big band techniques, but focused on jazz, under the tutelage of Charlie Adams, known for working with Yanni.

Chamberlin dropped out of high school and left home at age 15 and joined a series of local bands, culminating in a five year stint in local show band JP and the Cats. Although his early music career proved profitable, Chamberlin's father pressured him into going to college. In 1994, Chamberlin revealed that he had been estranged from his father for seven years. After several years with JP and the Cats, Chamberlin, wearied by the touring schedule, reduced his role and got a job building custom homes with his brother-in-law. Before long, he was recruited into The Smashing Pumpkins.

== Career ==
=== 1988-1996: The Smashing Pumpkins ===
The Smashing Pumpkins had been using a drum machine for early gigs, but were looking for a live drummer to open a show at Chicago club the Metro. Chamberlin and Billy Corgan met through a mutual friend, and Chamberlin expressed cautious interest, later recalling:

So I went out and saw the band – Billy, James, and D'arcy – playing at Avalon with a drum machine. Man, did they sound horrible! They were atrocious. But the thing I noticed was that not only were the song structures good, but Billy's voice had a lot of drive to it, like he was dying to succeed. So I ended up driving from work every Wednesday to rehearse with them.

Corgan had his own concerns:

He was wearing a pink t-shirt, stonewashed jeans, he had a mullet haircut, and he was driving a 280Z, and had yellow drums. We were sort of looking each other in the eye thinking, 'This ain't gonna happen, this is not the guy.' [But] he'd learned all our songs, as only Jimmy can, off the top of his head, and, within one practice, we were ready to play. It was amazing. We just knew right away. He's that good.

Chamberlin made "tons of cash" as a carpenter, before giving up the job to move to Chicago and devote himself to the band. Chamberlin's entry quickly pushed the band toward a more powerful, intense sound.

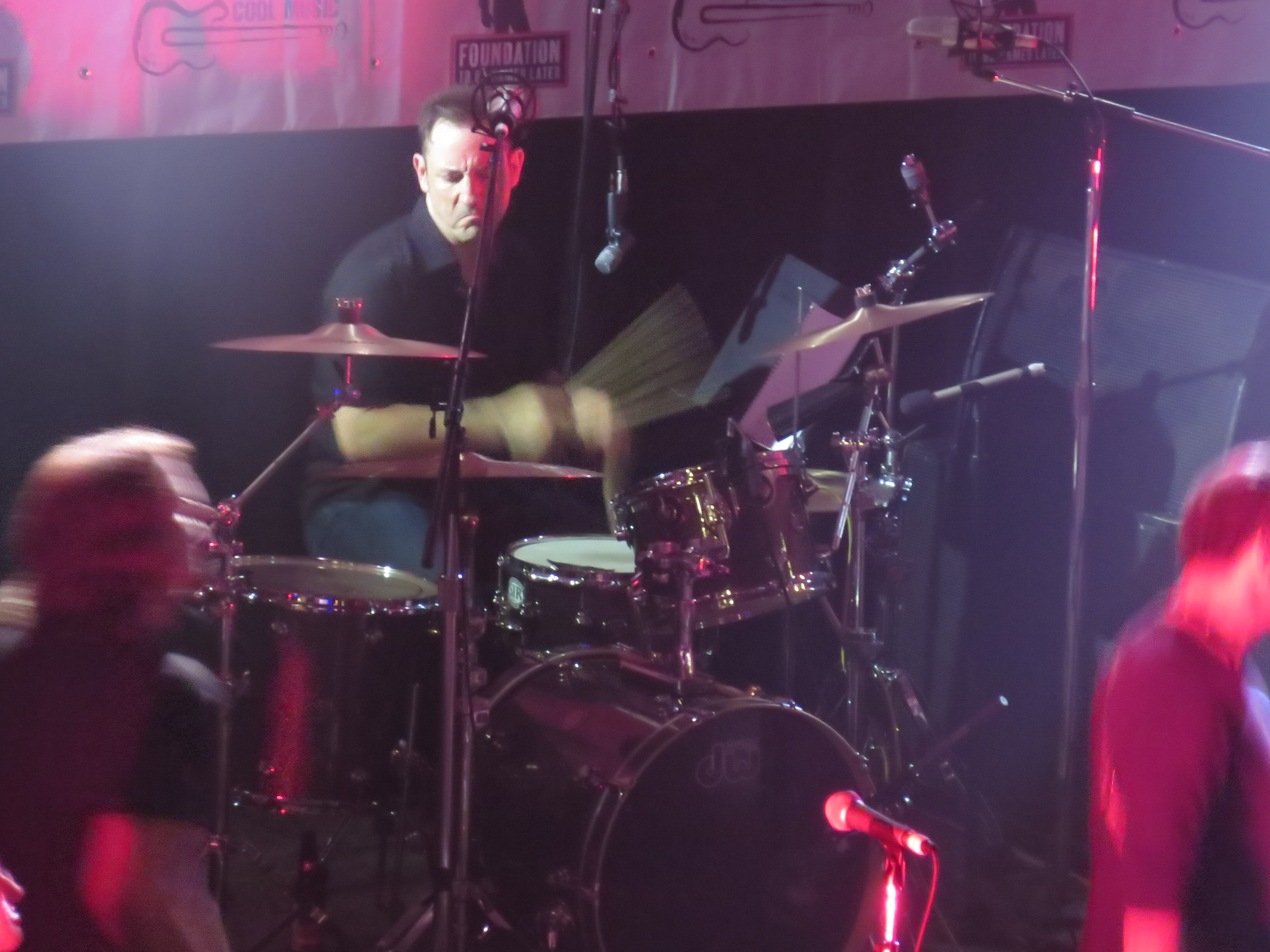
Chamberlin drumming in 2014

During this period Chamberlin struggled with substance abuse. During the recording of 1993's Siamese Dream in Marietta, Georgia, Chamberlin often disappeared for days at a time into the drug underworld of Atlanta, while the rest of the band feared for his life. He later said of his drug addiction that "It's pretty textbook [...] Guy makes it in rock band, gets very full of himself, starts thinking he's indestructible, and all of a sudden he destroys himself."

In the midst of the lengthy world tour supporting 1995's multi-platinum Mellon Collie and the Infinite Sadness, Chamberlin's father died, and his substance abuse hit a fever pitch. Of this period, Chamberlin later said, "I learned that escapism was better than emotion, and that's where I hid... It got to the point that I really didn't care. Life was scary for me." Prior to shows scheduled for July 12, 1996 at Madison Square Garden in New York City, Chamberlin and touring keyboardist Jonathan Melvoin overdosed on heroin; Melvoin subsequently died, and Chamberlin was kicked out of the band, ostensibly to protect his health. Corgan later told MTV News that Chamberlin had already overdosed on two different occasions during the Mellon Collie tour prior to the July 1996 event, but that the band had managed to keep those situations private.

=== 1998-2000: Return to the Pumpkins ===
In October 1998, Corgan convened a band meeting in which Chamberlin was reinstated as the group's drummer, and the band decided to break up after one more album and tour. The band yielded two albums in 2000, Machina/The Machines of God and the freely distributed Machina II/The Friends & Enemies of Modern Music, before performing a farewell show in Chicago on December 2, 2000.

=== 2001-2006: Zwan and Jimmy Chamberlin Complex ===
Chamberlin formed Zwan in 2001 with Corgan. The drummer predicted, "The band's going to be huge," but Zwan produced only one album, Mary Star of the Sea, before disbanding in 2003. "The band's only truly essential complement to Corgan, it's no surprise he's the sole Pumpkin to remain on board," noted Q's Garethy Grundy, "and it's still a thrill to hear him cut loose, his jackhammer fills lifting the more straightforward moments like Ride a Black Swan beyond the mundane and lending some overwhelming firepower to Baby Let's Rock!'s hysterical glam spectacular."

Chamberlin formed Jimmy Chamberlin Complex, in 2004, and released its first studio album, Life Begins Again, in 2005. Chamberlin stated that, with the Jimmy Chamberlin Complex, "I just wanted to make music and not really be constrained to making a Zwan or a Pumpkins record."

=== 2006-2009: The Smashing Pumpkins Revival ===
Billy Corgan announced at an April 2004 solo performance that he and Chamberlin intended to work together again in the future. After appearing on Life Begins Again, Corgan announced plans to "renew and revive" the Pumpkins through a full-page advertisement in his hometown's newspaper, the Chicago Tribune, on June 21, 2005. Chamberlin contacted Corgan to accept, and on February 2, 2006, MTV.com reported that he and Corgan had signed a new management deal with the Front Line Management, with a spokesperson confirming they had signed under the name "Smashing Pumpkins".

Chamberlin and Corgan, without the other original members, decided to record an album alone. They played their first show in Paris on May 22, 2007, with three new band members. On July 10, the new album, Zeitgeist, was released to strong sales and mixed reviews. Over the next year and a half, the band released more recordings and a documentary and toured extensively.

On March 20, 2009 the Pumpkins' website announced that Chamberlin was leaving the band. Chamberlin released a blog stating that he left as he felt that the band would not further his commitment to music.

=== 2009-2015: Other Projects ===
While giving drum clinics in late 2009, Chamberlin announced his next project, a band called This. Describing the music as 'progressive, symphonic pop' he reported that the band, also including multi-instrumentalists Mike Reina and guitarist Anthony Pirog, would record with Roy Thomas Baker in Washington, D.C. in early 2010. This released their first album, a six-track release titled Great Civilizations, on November 1, 2010 as a digital download only, on both Amazon and iTunes. No official release announcement was made even on the band's official website. Downloads from iTunes and Amazon were removed after there was confusion over the band's name. Due to the difficulty in searching for the band under its original name, the band was soon renamed Skysaw. In March 2011 it was announced that the Skysaw full-length LP would be released on Dangerbird Records. On June 21, 2011, the new, extended 10 song LP Great Civilizations was released. The band subsequently toured with label mates Minus The Bear, performed hometown shows at Chicago's Metro and the Black Cat in Washington, DC, and performed on the JBTV Television Show in Chicago, IL.

In 2011, after introductions by then 1871 CEO Kevin Willer, Chamberlin began working with the burgeoning Chicago tech scene as an investor and advisor. Chamberlin's increased involvement with startups led him to an introduction to LiveOne Inc., a digital media company. Founders Tim and John Ganschow (of Chicago) were presenting their new social platform, CrowdSurfing, to an investment group that included Chamberlin. Chamberlin was impressed with the fledgling company and the CrowdSurfing technology and subsequently came on board to support the company both financially and as an advisor. In 2013 Chamberlin became Chief Executive Officer of LiveOne Inc. LiveOne Inc. has since partnered with Yahoo, YouTube, Live Nation, AEG, Vans, Phish, C3, Budweiser's Made In America Festival, Umphrey's McGee, among others.

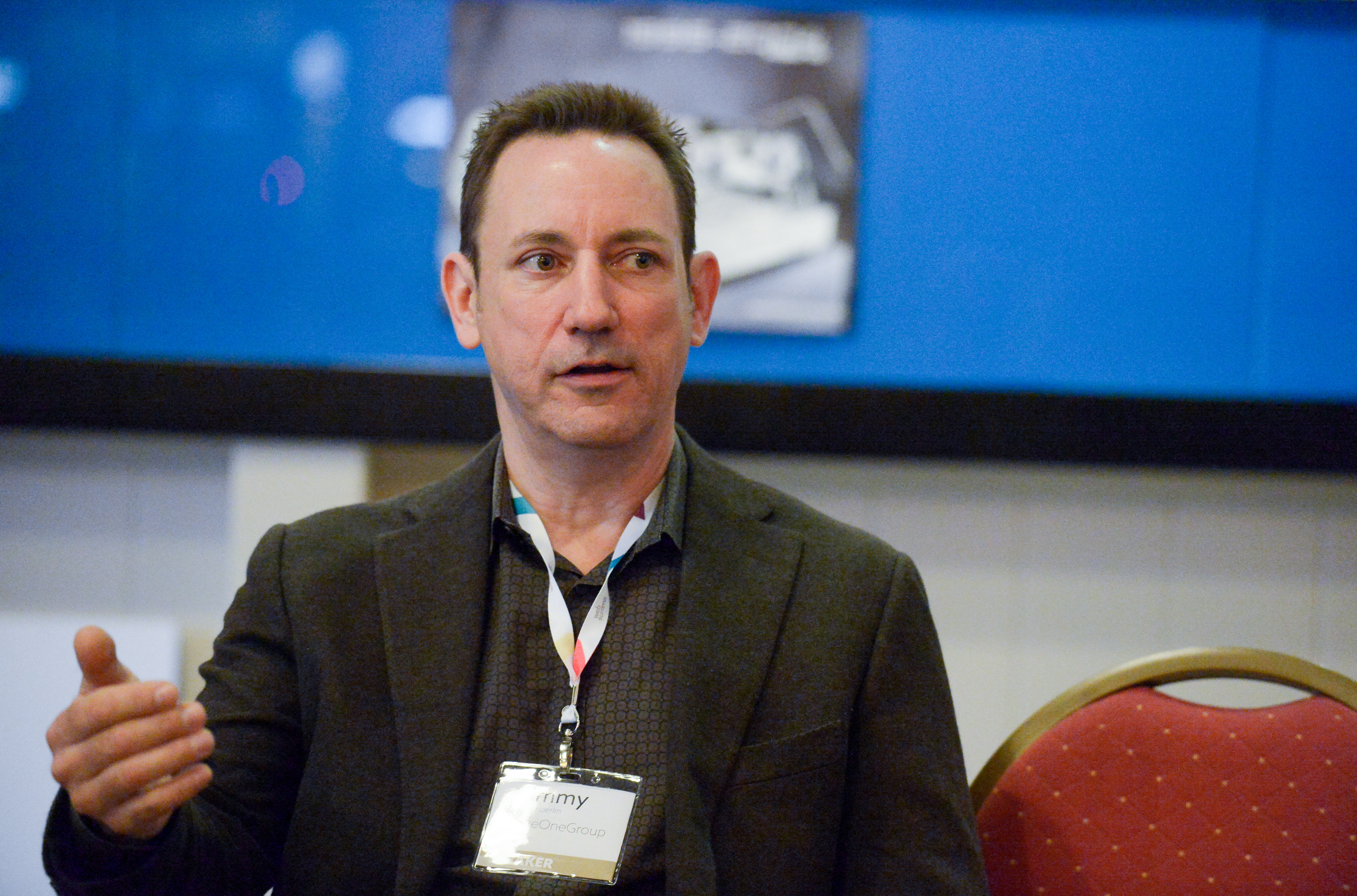
Chamberlin at the Web Summit in 2014

In November 2014 Chamberlin attended Web Summit, Ireland's top tech conference. While there, he spoke of his time with the Smashing Pumpkins as well as on the future of digital music at the Web Summit Centre Stage with Adrian Grenier, Chris Kaskie, and Brian Morrissey. He pointed to digital as the medium for artists to truly express themselves and create art that connects with their fans: "Artists are looking for a destination ... [and] digital gives them the opportunity to realize some of those destinations and package them in a way that allows them to be creative".

Chamberlin joined Chicago jazz saxophonist Frank Catalano in 2013 for a number of live performances in the Chicago area. Since then they have continued to play live shows and have released a series of albums together. On July 29, 2014, Love Supreme Collective - EP featuring Jimmy Chamberlin, Percy Jones, Chris Poland, and Adam Benjamin was released and quickly became the #1 selling jazz album on iTunes USA. The follow-up album, released April 7, 2015 called "God's Gonna Cut You Down" debuted at No. 2 on the iTunes Jazz sales chart and was the #1 charting Instrumental album upon its release in April 2015. It reached number 4 on the Billboard Jazz charts. On May 27, 2016, a 3rd collaboration between Catalano and Chamberlin was released called "Bye Bye Blackbird". This record features David Sanborn.

On April 29, 2016, the Jimmy Chamberlin Complex released a new song "Paranoia" via Jimmy Chamberlin's Official Twitter account

=== 2015-Present: Return to Prominence ===
Chamberlin again joined the Smashing Pumpkins as a touring member for the 2015 End Times Tour. Chamberlin remained in the touring line-up for the subsequent "In Plainsong" Tour in 2016

Chamberlin and former guitarist James Iha rejoined on a permanent basis in February 2018, and the band embarked on their reunion tour, the Shiny And Oh So Bright Tour and released an album at the end of 2018, Shiny and Oh So Bright, Vol. 1 / LP: No Past. No Future. No Sun.. Chamberlin further contributed to the albums Cyr (2020), Atum: A Rock Opera in Three Acts (2023), and Aghori Mhori Mei (2024). The band has remained active on the touring circuit since 2018.

== Personal life ==
Chamberlin married his wife Lori in 2002. Together they have two children, Audrey (born 2002) and Lucas (born 2007), a competitive gymnast who was diagnosed as an infant with juvenile dermatomyositis (JDM). Chamberlin and his wife have been involved with JDM charities.

Chamberlin's past substance use issues have been well-documented; he drank heavily throughout the early 1990s and a brief period using heroin resulted in the well-publicized 1996 overdose that resulted in Chamberlin's expulsion from the Smashing Pumpkins. He has been "California sober" since 2004. Chamberlin is currently vegan.

In addition to his musical and business pursuits, Chamberlin is an avid race car driver, competing professionally with IMSA in the late 1990s. Chamberlin is also a motorcycle enthusiast and owns a Triumph Bonneville T120.

Chamberlin also enjoys birdwatching and bird photography.

== Musical style and influences ==
Chamberlin comes from a jazz background, and he notes jazz musicians Benny Goodman, Duke Ellington, Gene Krupa, Buddy Rich, and Billy Cobham as influences. He has also been compared to jazz drummer Dennis Chambers for his "quick hands, furious snare rolls, and crackling rimshots." In general, he is one of the few hard rock drummers to combine a driving backbeat with jazz-like flourishes. When asked about his influences in 2007, he responded:

Aside from the obvious – Keith Moon, John Bonham, Ian Paice – I would have to say Tony Williams, Elvin Jones, any of the jazz greats – Gene Krupa, those people. I think, more and more, as I get older, I've developed my own rock style and I tend to pull more stuff from Elvin Jones and Tony now that I can incorporate it into a rock arena and kind of modernize it.

Other drummers that influenced Chamberlin around the recording of Zeitgeist included Bobby Caldwell of Captain Beyond, Lalo Schifrin's Dirty Harry soundtrack, Weather Report, and Return to Forever's Lenny White.

Through 2007, Chamberlin rarely used Pro Tools or click tracks, though has embraced both in more recent years. He uses the slide technique for double strokes on the bass drum.

Bandmate Billy Corgan has said of Chamberlin, "he's up there with Bonham, you know, that level of drummer, who has been able to play a variety of music and have his style impact the way people play drums. That's the hallmark of a great drummer. And, right now, I think, pound for pound, he's the best drummer in the world."

== Equipment ==
On the Smashing Pumpkins album Zeitgeist and subsequent tour, Chamberlin used a Yamaha Maple Custom Absolute kit with 60° bearing edges, rather than the standard 45°. His kit consisted of two snares (5x12 and the main snare, his 5.5x14 "Signature" model – Yamaha SD-2455JC), six toms (12x14, 8x10, 9x13, and an 8x8 above his floor toms which are 16x16 and 16x18), a 16x22 bass drum. Around 2000, as seen in "The Everlasting Gaze" video from "Machines of God" album, he switched from Sabian to Zildjian cymbals. His setup included four crash cymbals (a 15" thin and three Zildjian A customs – 15", 18", and 19"), an 8" splash cymbal, 15" New Beat hi-hats, a 20" China High, a 22" K Constantinople medium ride, and a 22" riveted swish knocker. He occasionally used a triangle on his kit, mounted above the hi hats. Chamberlin's drumheads are Remo coated Ambassador on snare-side, clear Emperors on tom batters with clear Ambassadors underneath, with a Powerstoke 3 on the bass drum batter and Vic Firth 5B sticks. His signature snare drum is popular with other drummers – Chad Smith has been known to use it as a second snare drum.

On April 6, 2011, Chamberlin announced that he had switched from long-term drum manufacturer Yamaha to Drum Workshop. He has ordered a custom "prototype" Copper Lacquer Specialty with Chrome Hardware. The Shells are a ply combination of VLT Maple and Mahogany with no reinforcement hoops. The kick drum hoops are Solid Black Lacquer. The sizes are 5x8, 7x10, 8x13, 10x14 rack toms; 14x14, 16x16 floor toms; 16x22 kick and with a matching 5.5x14 snare; and a stainless steel 6.5x14 snare.

In 2015, Chamberlin began endorsing Sakae drums. His set up consisted of a 22x16" bass drum, 13x9" rack tom, 8x7" rack tom, 10x8" rack tom, 14x14" floor tom and a 16x16 floor tom. His snare was a Sakae maple 14x6.

In 2017 Chamberlin switched from Zildjian cymbals to Istanbul Agop cymbals. In 2018, Chamberlin returned to Yamaha Drums.

As stated by himself in a Modern Drummer interview about his 2022 tour drumkit, Jimmy currently uses Vic Firth Modern Jazz MJC4 Drumsticks.

== Discography ==
The Smashing Pumpkins

Main article: The Smashing Pumpkins discography
- 1991: Gish
- 1993: Siamese Dream
- 1995: Mellon Collie and the Infinite Sadness
- 2000: Machina/The Machines of God
- 2000: Machina II/The Friends & Enemies of Modern Music
- 2007: Zeitgeist
- 2018: Shiny and Oh So Bright, Vol. 1 / LP: No Past. No Future. No Sun.
- 2020: Cyr
- 2022–2023: Atum: A Rock Opera in Three Acts
- 2024: Aghori Mhori Mei (2024)

With Frank Catalano

- 2014: Love Supreme Collective - EP
- 2015: God's Gonna Cut You Down
- 2016: Bye Bye Blackbird (with David Sanborn)

Side projects

- 1998: The Last Hard Men (The Last Hard Men) (limited release 1998, reissue 2001)
- 2003: Mary Star of the Sea (Zwan)
- 2005: Life Begins Again (Jimmy Chamberlin Complex)
- 2011: Great Civilizations (Skysaw)
- 2011: Prana & Pinda (Shaman Durek)
- 2017: The Parable (Jimmy Chamberlin Complex)
- 2020: Honor (Jimmy Chamberlin Complex)

Guest appearances

- 1994: She Knows Everything (remix) (Medicine)
- 1997: Starjob (The Frogs)
- 1997: Boom! Boom! Boom! (The Kelley Deal 6000)
- 2005: TheFutureEmbrace (Billy Corgan) (appears on "DIA")
- 2006: Gone (Bill Madden)
- 2006: Help Yourself Charlie Paxson (appears on "C.Y.T")
- 2010: Not From Here (Gannin Arnold) (appears on "Not From Here" and "Get On with It")
- 2010: Metro: The Official Bootleg Series, Volume 1 (appears on "Freedom")
- 2014: "Tomorrow In Progress" (Tyson Meade)
