= Love Supreme Collective =

EP by Frank Catalano
- Released: July 29, 2014
- Recorded: 2014
- Genre: Broken Beat, Nu Jazz
- Length: 21:58
- Label: Ropeadope
- Producer: Frank Catalano

Love Supreme Collective is a 2014 extended play by jazz musician Frank Catalano, released on July 29, 2014. The recording features Jimmy Chamberlin from the Smashing Pumpkins, Percy Jones from Brand X, Chris Poland from Megadeth, and Adam Benjamin from Kneebody. Upon release, it became the #1 selling jazz album on iTunes USA.

== Track listing ==
1. "Acknowledgement of Truth" (7:44)
2. "Resolution of Purpose" (3:19)
3. "Pursuance and Persistence" (6:12)
4. "Psalm For John" (4:43)

== Personnel ==
- Frank Catalano - saxophone
- Jimmy Chamberlin - drums and percussion
- Percy Jones - bass guitar
- Chris Poland - guitar
- Adam Benjamin - keyboards
