= Skysaw =

American alternative rock band

- Origin: United States
- Genres: Alternative rock
- Years active: 2009–2012
- Label: Dangerbird
- Past members: Jimmy Chamberlin, Anthony Pirog, Mike Reina
- Website: dangerbirdrecords.com/releases/great-civilizations/

Skysaw was an American alternative rock band featuring The Smashing Pumpkins drummer Jimmy Chamberlin along with multi-instrumentalist/vocalist/songwriter Mike Reina and guitarist Anthony Pirog.

== History ==
Formed in 2009, alternative rock band Skysaw featured Jimmy Chamberlin along with Mike Reina and Anthony Pirog. Reina and Pirog fronted a Washington DC–based psych-pop ensemble called The Jackfields. Reina was introduced first to Chamberlin through a mutual acquaintance, and through him, Pirog. The band name is a reference to the song "Sky Saw", the opening track of Brian Eno's album Another Green World.

The band released its debut full-length album, Great Civilizations, in June 2011.

The band performed live in 2011 with additional touring members, multi-instrumentalist/vocalist Boris Skalsky and guitarist Paul Wood, both of Dead Heart Bloom.

On August 23, 2012, Jimmy Chamberlin revealed the dissolution of Skysaw.

== Great Civilizations ==
Great Civilizations

Studio album by Skysaw
- Released: 2011
- Studio: The Brink
- Length: 41:47
- Label: Dangerbird
- Producer: Skysaw

Great Civilizations is the only album by the American band Skysaw, released on June 21, 2011.

== Track listing ==
All tracks are written by Skysaw.

Great Civilizations track listing
No.	Title	Length
1.	"No One Can Tell"	4:09
2.	"Capsized Jackknifed Crisis"	4:11
3.	"Tightrope Situation"	5:27
4.	"Serrated"	4:37
5.	"Am I Second"	4:35
6.	"Nothing's Ever Easy"	3:06
7.	"Tracey Jayney Girl"	2:45
8.	"Great Civilizations"	4:16
9.	"All I Hear Is Snow"	4:27
10.	"Sad Reasons"	4:15
Total length:		41:48

=== Personnel ===
Skysaw

- Mike Reina – vocals; synthesizer (tracks 1–4, 6–10), Mellotron (tracks 1, 2, 5, 6, 8), piano (tracks 2, 3, 5–10), bass (tracks 1–3, 5, 7–10), guitar (tracks 1, 2, 4, 6, 9)
- Anthony Pirog – guitar; synthesizer (tracks 1, 3, 4, 7, 9, 10), percussion (tracks 2, 8, 10), bass (tracks 4, 8)
- Jimmy Chamberlin – drums, percussion

Additional Personnel

- Rebecca Steele – cello (track 5)
- Janel Leppin – strings (track 5)
- Heather MacArthur – viola (track 5)
- Cheryl Pearson – violin (track 5)
- Drew Morris – backing vocals (track 9)
