= Mary Star of the Sea (album) =

Studio album by Zwan
- Released: January 28, 2003 (US), February 10, 2003 (UK)
- Recorded: 2002
- Studio: Electrical Audio (Chicago); Chicago Recording Company (Chicago)
- Genre: Alternative rock
- Length: 65:45
- Label: Martha's Music/Reprise
- Producer: Billy Corgan, Bjorn Thorsrud

Billy Corgan chronology
| Machina II/The Friends & Enemies of Modern Music (2000) | Mary Star of the Sea (2003) | TheFutureEmbrace (2005) |

Singles from Mary Star of the Sea
- 1. "Honestly" Released: November 2002 February 24, 2003 (re-released); 2. "Lyric" Released: June 3, 2003

Mary Star of the Sea is the only studio album by American alternative rock band Zwan, released on January 28, 2003 on Reprise (February 10 in the UK). Produced by frontman Billy Corgan and Bjorn Thorsrud, the album was supported by the singles "Honestly" and "Lyric".

The album debuted at number 3 in the US, selling 90,000 copies in its first week, and over 250,000 copies by the time of the band's break-up later that year. Described by Corgan as "the great lost Pumpkins record", the album's music was spearheaded by Corgan and drummer Jimmy Chamberlin.

The album is named both for the Blessed Virgin Mary, from whom bandleader Corgan claimed to find comfort and guidance, and for the Catholic Church in Key West, Florida where he spent time during Zwan's early rehearsals. Seven months after the album's release Corgan announced the band's dissolution, which he attributed to conflicts between the band's members.

== Critical reception ==
Professional ratings
Aggregate scores
| Source | Rating |
|---|---|
| Metacritic | 79/100 |
Review scores
| Source | Rating |
| AllMusic | 4/5 stars |
| Entertainment Weekly | A− |
| The Guardian | 4/5 stars |
| Los Angeles Times | 3/4 stars |
| NME | 8/10 |
| Pitchfork | 4.8/10 |
| Q | 4/5 stars |
| Rolling Stone | 4/5 stars |
| Spin | 8/10 |
| Uncut | 4/5 stars |

Mary Star of the Sea received mostly positive reviews. David Browne of Entertainment Weekly named it the sixth best album of 2003. The Alternative Press called the album a "return to form" for Corgan.

"There's none of the schizophrenia that afflicted The Smashing Pumpkins' half-shouty, half-pop final outing Machina/The Machines of God," enthused Q's Garethy Grundy, "just a lighter, prettier, more concise sound… Those who saw out the wilderness years that followed 1998's forlorn, career-killing Adore will consider Zwan their reward. It's as sweet-natured, if not quite as wistful, as that undervalued effort, and the influence of [Corgan's] new favourite band, New Order, is even more pronounced."

The album debuted at number 3 in the US, selling 90,000 copies in its first week. But it quickly descended the charts, and fell short of the sales of any Smashing Pumpkins album. It had sold 250,000 copies by the time of the band's breakup.

== Track listing ==
All songs were written by Billy Corgan, except where noted.

1. "Lyric" – 3:17
2. "Settle Down" (Corgan, Paz Lenchantin) – 5:25
3. "Declarations of Faith" – 4:17
4. "Honestly" – 3:45
5. "El Sol" (Corgan, traditional) – 3:38
6. "Of a Broken Heart" – 3:54
7. "Ride a Black Swan" (Corgan, traditional) – 4:53
8. "Heartsong" – 3:08
9. "Endless Summer" – 4:22
10. "Baby Let's Rock!" – 3:41
11. "Yeah!" – 3:06
12. "Desire" – 4:14
13. "Jesus, I"/"Mary Star of the Sea" (Traditional/Zwan) – 14:04
14. "Come with Me" – 4:01

=== Deluxe edition ===
A deluxe edition of the album was also released, which included a bonus DVD entitled For Your Love, a 40-minute collage of interviews, studio performances, and miscellaneous footage, some of which comes from the aborted Djali Zwan album/film. The songs listed on the DVD are "My Life and Times", "Rivers We Can't Cross", "Mary Star of the Sea", "Love Lies in Ruin", "For Your Love", "Down, Down, Down", "A New Poetry", "W.P.", "Jesus, I", "God's Gonna Set This World on Fire", "To Love You", "Consumed", a different rendition of "My Life and Times", "Danger Boy", and "Spilled Milk", but they are not clips of the full songs.

== Personnel ==
Band

- Billy Corgan (as Billy Burke) – guitar, vocals, producer, additional mixing
- Jimmy Chamberlin – drums
- Matt Sweeney – guitar, vocals
- Paz Lenchantin – bass, vocals
- David Pajo – guitar

Additional musicians

- Ana Lenchantin – cello on "Of a Broken Heart"

Production

- Bjorn Thorsrud – producer, additional mixing
- Alan Moulder – mixer
- Ron Lowe – engineer
- Manny A. Sanchez – engineer
- Mathieu LeJeune – engineer
- Greg Norman – engineer
- Rob Bochnik – engineer
- Azuolas Sinkevicius – assistant engineer
- Lionel Darenne – assistant engineer
- Mark Twitchell – second assistant engineer
- Jarod Kluemper – second assistant engineer
- Russ Arbuthnot – second assistant engineer
- Tim Harrington – guitar sound re-enforcer
- Jason Kirkingburg - guitar tech
- Linda Strawberry – assistant to Mr. Thorsrud
- Howie Weinberg – mastering
- Roger Lian – digital editing
- Geoff McFetridge – design

For Your Love DVD personnel

- Lester Cohn – director
- Greg Sylvester, Damon Ranger, Lester Cohn, and Brian Churchwell – cameras
- Tony "Tadpole" Mysliwiec – audio mastering
- David May – DVD producer
- Penny Marciano – DVD production director
- Raena Winscott – DVD graphics coordinator
- Davi Russo – DVD graphics design
- Jim Atkins – authoring

== Charts ==
=== Album ===
Chart performance for Mary Star of the Sea
| Chart (2003) | Peak position |
|---|---|
| Australian Albums (ARIA) | 6 |
| Austrian Albums (Ö3 Austria) | 44 |
| Belgian Albums (Ultratop Flanders) | 44 |
| Belgian Albums (Ultratop Wallonia) | 17 |
| Canadian Albums (Billboard) | 4 |
| Danish Albums (Hitlisten) | 18 |
| Dutch Albums (Album Top 100) | 30 |
| Finnish Albums (Suomen virallinen lista) | 14 |
| French Albums (SNEP) | 40 |
| German Albums (Offizielle Top 100) | 17 |
| Irish Albums (IRMA) | 10 |
| Italian Albums (FIMI) | 14 |
| New Zealand Albums (RMNZ) | 10 |
| Norwegian Albums (VG-lista) | 12 |
| Scottish Albums (OCC) | 24 |
| Spanish Albums (PROMUSICAE) | 43 |
| Swedish Albums (Sverigetopplistan) | 17 |
| Swiss Albums (Schweizer Hitparade) | 50 |
| UK Albums (OCC) | 33 |
| US Billboard 200 | 3 |

=== Singles ===
Chart performance of singles from Mary Star of the Sea
| Title | Year | Chart positions | | | | |
| Title | Year | US Modern Rock | US Mainstream Rock | AUS | GER | UK |
|---|---|---|---|---|---|---|
| "Honestly" | 2002 | 7 | 21 | 26 | 86 | 28 |
| "Lyric" | 2003 | — | — | — | — | 44 |
