= Billy Corgan =

American musician and songwriter (born 1967)

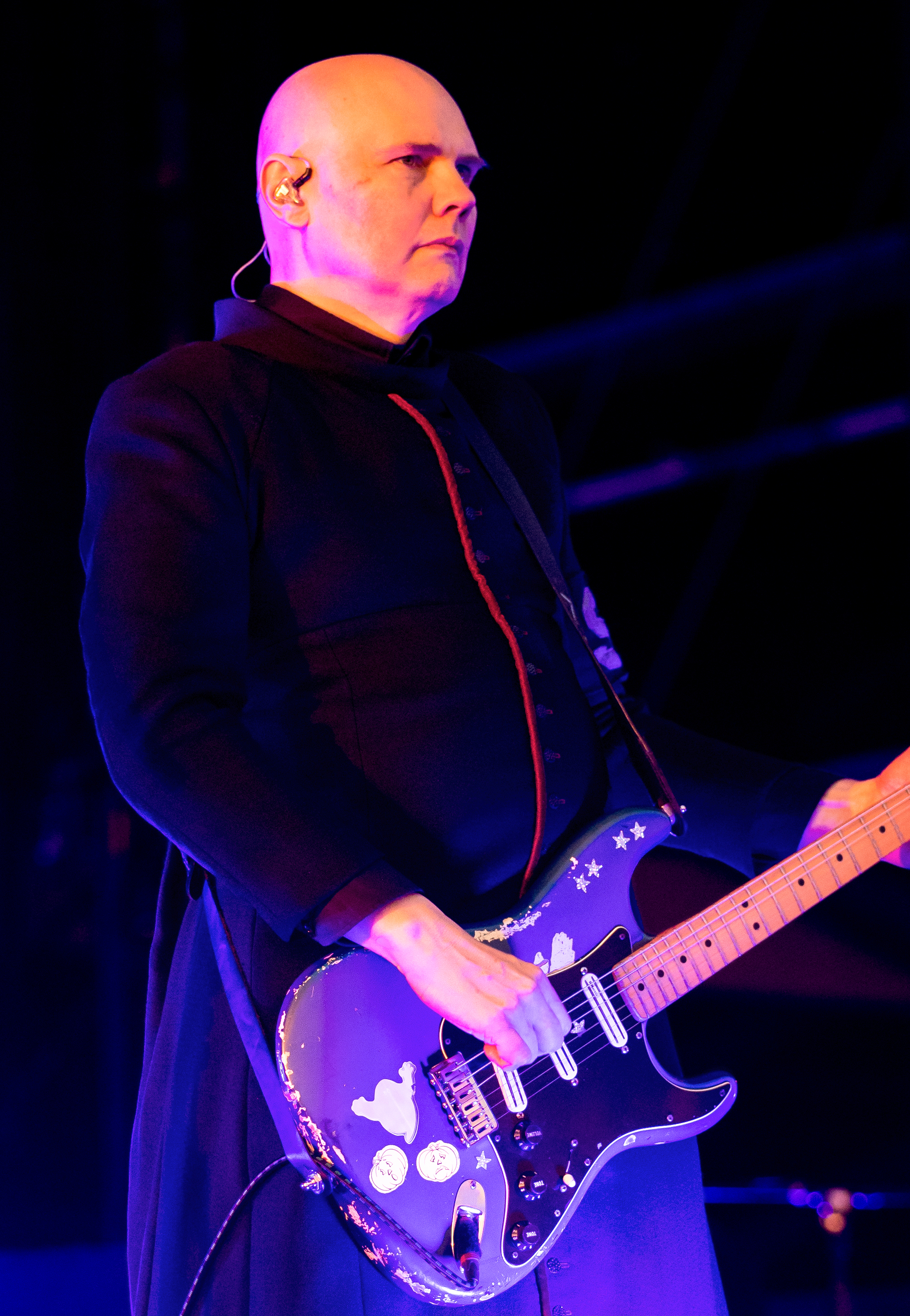
- Corgan performing with The Smashing Pumpkins in 2019
- Born: William Patrick Corgan Jr. March 17, 1967 (age 59); Chicago, Illinois, U.S.
- Occupations: Musician; singer; songwriter; professional wrestling promoter; podcaster
- Years active: 1985–present
- Spouses: Chris Fabian (m. 1993; div. 1997) Chloe Mendel (m. 2023)
- Children: 3
- Musical career
- Genres: Alternative rock; hard rock; alternative metal; grunge; psychedelic rock
- Instruments: Vocals; guitar; keyboards; bass
- Labels: Caroline; Virgin; Reprise; Warner Bros.; Sumerian; BMG
- Member of: The Smashing Pumpkins
- Formerly of: Deep Blue Dream; The Marked; Spirits in the Sky; Starchildren; Zwan

William Patrick Corgan Jr. (born March 17, 1967) is an American musician, singer-songwriter, and professional wrestling promoter. He is best known as the co-founder, lead guitarist, primary songwriter, singer, and only constant member of alternative rock band the Smashing Pumpkins. Corgan is credited with helping popularize the alternative rock genre. He has also been the owner and promoter of the National Wrestling Alliance since 2017.

Corgan formed the Smashing Pumpkins in Chicago in 1988 alongside guitarist James Iha, with bassist D'arcy Wretzky and drummer Jimmy Chamberlin joining soon after. Strong album sales and large-scale tours propelled the band to commercial success and critical acclaim throughout the 1990s. After their break-up in 2000, Corgan and Chamberlin started a new band called Zwan; after the band's demise, he released the collection of poetry Blinking with Fists (2004) and the solo album TheFutureEmbrace (2005) before reforming Smashing Pumpkins in 2007. The new version of the band, consisting of Corgan and a revolving lineup, has released new albums and toured extensively. In October 2017, Corgan released Ogilala, his first solo album in over a decade. His latest solo album, Cotillions, was released in 2019.

Corgan co-founded Resistance Pro Wrestling in 2011. He joined TNA Wrestling in 2015 and became its president in 2016, but left a few months later. He purchased the National Wrestling Alliance (NWA) in 2017; thereafter, Corgan made it his primary focus in professional wrestling.

== Early life ==
William Patrick Corgan Jr. was born at Columbus Hospital in the Lincoln Park neighborhood of Chicago on March 17, 1967, the elder child of Martha Louise Maes (1947–1996) and guitarist William Dale Corgan (1947–2021). He is of English, Irish, and Scottish descent on his father's side, and Belgian, Flemish, and Italian descent on his mother's side. He grew up Catholic and has a younger brother. His parents divorced in 1970. Billy said he went to live with his great-grandmother, and then his grandmother. Next he and his brother went to live with his father and new wife (a flight attendant whom his father had married) in Glendale Heights, Illinois, a Chicago suburb 22 miles west of the city. His father was a musician and was often away; when Billy was nine his father and stepmother (whom Billy considers to be his mother) split.

Billy alleges that his father was abusive to him, both physically and emotionally. He developed a protective bond with his younger paternal half-brother, Jesse, who had special needs as a child. When Billy's father and stepmother separated, all three boys lived with their stepmother. Billy said his father was a "drug dealing, gun-toting musician [and] mad man". Although William Corgan Sr. negatively impacted his son's childhood, Corgan said he came to have tremendous respect for his father's musicianship.

Corgan, who grew much faster than his fellow students, was a strong athlete in elementary school. In addition to being a member of his baseball team at Marquardt Middle School, he amassed over 10,000 baseball cards and listened to every Chicago Cubs game on the radio. However, by the time he began attending Glenbard North High School, his athletic prowess had greatly diminished. He decided to start playing guitar after seeing a Flying V when he went over to a friend's house.

Corgan gave his savings to his father, who bought him a used Les Paul knock-off. His father encouraged him to listen to Jeff Beck and Jimi Hendrix, but offered little other support, so Corgan taught himself. His musical interests in high school included hard rock music like Guts-era John Cale, heavy metal pioneers Black Sabbath, and mainstream rock like Van Halen, Queen, Boston, ELO, Rush, and Cheap Trick. Corgan discovered the alternative rock genre by listening to Bauhaus and the Cure. He performed in a string of bands in high school and graduated as an honor student. Despite grant and scholarship offers from a number of schools, and a tuition fund left by his grandmother, Corgan decided to pursue music full-time.

== Music career ==
=== 1985–1987: Early career ===
Not finding the Chicago music scene to his liking, Corgan moved to St. Petersburg, Florida, in 1985 with his first major band, The Marked (named for the conspicuous birthmarks of both Corgan and drummer Ron Roesing). Not finding success in St. Petersburg, the band dissolved; Corgan moved back to Chicago and lived with his father. From 1987 to 1988, he played guitar in Chicago band Deep Blue Dream, which also featured future Static-X frontman Wayne Static. He left the band to focus on the Smashing Pumpkins.

=== 1988–2000: The Smashing Pumpkins ===
Upon his return to Chicago, Corgan had already devised his next project – a band that would be called the Smashing Pumpkins. Corgan met guitarist James Iha while working in a record store, and the two began recording demos, which Corgan describes as "gloomy little goth-pop records". He met bassist D'arcy Wretzky after a local show, arguing with her about a band that had just played, the Dan Reed Network. Soon after, the Smashing Pumpkins were formed. The trio began to play together at local clubs with a drum machine for percussion. To secure a show at the Metro in Chicago, the band recruited drummer Jimmy Chamberlin, and played for the first time as a quartet on October 5, 1988.

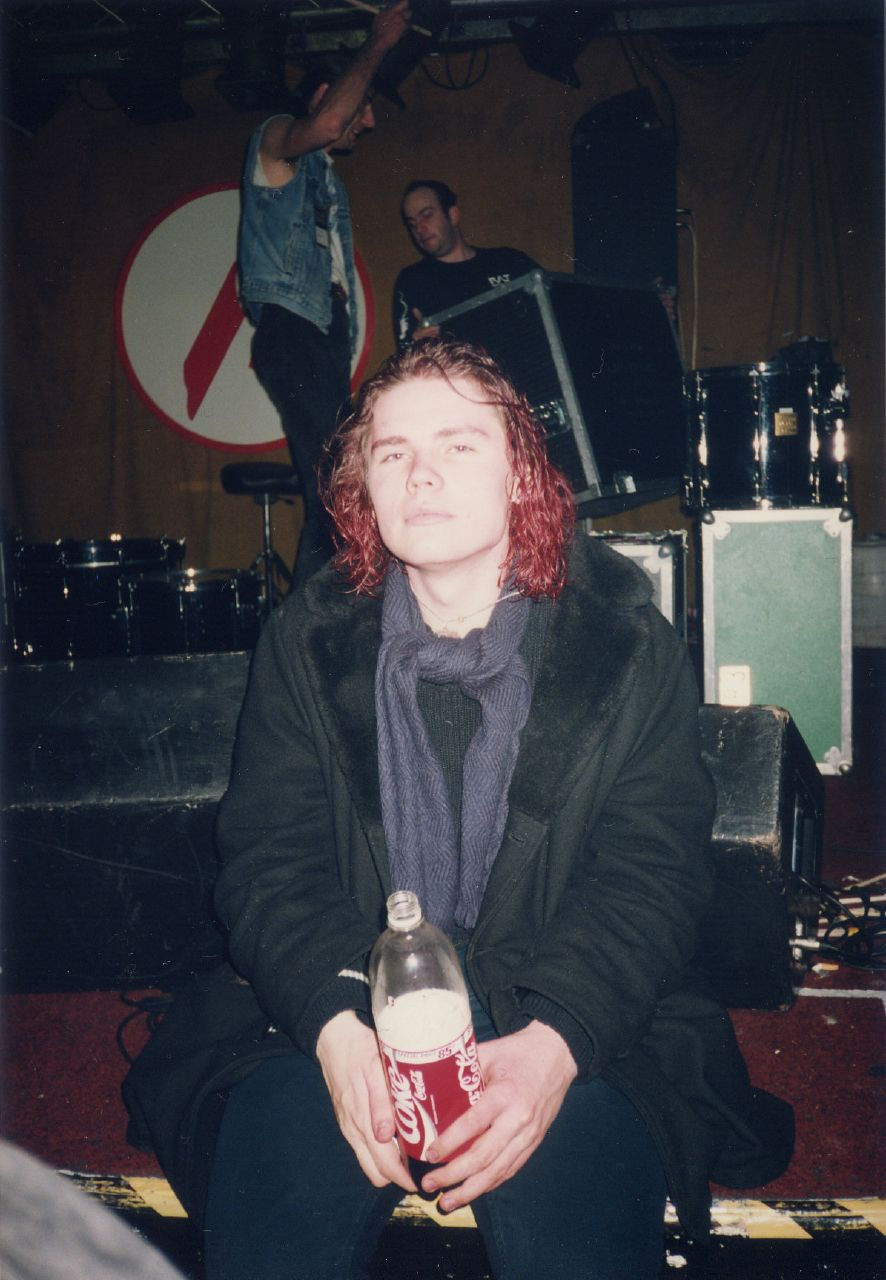
Corgan in 1992

The addition of Chamberlin drove the band in a heavier direction almost immediately. On the band's debut album, Gish (1991), the band integrated psychedelic rock and heavy metal into their sound. Gish fared better than expected, but the follow-up, Siamese Dream, released on Virgin Records in 1993, became a multi-platinum hit. The band became known for internal drama during this period, with Corgan frequently characterized in the music press as a "control freak" due to rumors that he played all the guitar and bass parts on Siamese Dream (a rumor that Corgan later confirmed as true). Despite this, the album was well received by critics, and the songs "Today", "Cherub Rock", and "Disarm" became hits.

The band's 1995 follow-up effort, the double album Mellon Collie and the Infinite Sadness, was even more successful, spawning a string of hit singles. According to Jon Pareles from The New York Times, Corgan wanted to "lose himself and find himself ..." in this album. The album was nominated for seven Grammy awards that year, and would eventually be certified ten times platinum in the United States. The song "1979" was Corgan's biggest hit to date, reaching No. 1 on Billboard's modern rock and mainstream rock charts. Their appearance on Saturday Night Live on November 11, 1995, to promote this material (their second appearance on the show overall) was also the television debut appearance of Corgan's shaved head, which he has maintained consistently since.

On July 12, 1996, touring keyboardist Jonathan Melvoin died in a Manhattan hotel room of a heroin overdose after he and Chamberlin used the drug together. Chamberlin was later arrested on a misdemeanor drug possession charge. The Smashing Pumpkins made the decision to fire Chamberlin and continue as a trio. This shakeup, coupled with Corgan going through a divorce and the death of his mother, influenced the somber mood of the band's next album, 1998's Adore. Featuring a darker, more subdued and heavily electronic sound at a time when alternative rock was declining in mainstream cachet, Adore divided both critics and fans, resulting in a significant decrease in album sales (it sold 1.3 million in the US).

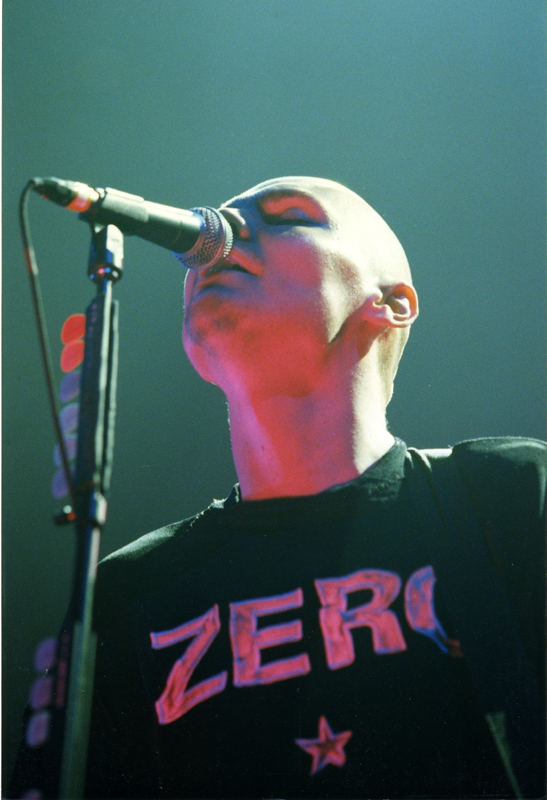
Corgan performing in 1997

Chamberlin was reunited with the band in 1999. In 2000, they released Machina/The Machines of God, a concept album on which the band deliberately played to their public image. Critics were again divided, and sales were lower than before; Machina is the second lowest-selling commercially released Smashing Pumpkins album to date, with U.S. sales of 583,000 units up to 2005. During the recording for Machina, Wretzky quit the band and was replaced for the upcoming tour by former Hole bassist Melissa Auf der Maur. In 2000 the band released Machina II/The Friends & Enemies of Modern Music free over the Internet and broke up at the end of the year, playing their last show on December 2, 2000, at the Cabaret Metro.

=== 2001–2005: Zwan and solo career ===
Following a brief stint touring with New Order in the summer, Corgan reunited with Chamberlin to form the band Zwan with Corgan's old friend Matt Sweeney in late 2001. The lineup was completed with guitarist David Pajo and bassist Paz Lenchantin. The band had two distinct incarnations, the primary approach being an upbeat rock band with a three-guitar-driven sound, the second, a folk and gospel inspired acoustic side with live strings. The quintet performed throughout 2002, and their debut album, Mary Star of the Sea, was released in early 2003 to generally positive reviews. In the midst of their supporting tour for the album, mounting conflict between Corgan and Chamberlin and the other band members led to the cancellation of the rest of the tour as the band entered an apparent hiatus, formally breaking up in September 2003.

In 2004, Corgan began writing revealing autobiographical posts on his website and his MySpace page under the title The Confessions of Billy Corgan, discussing subjects from his troubled childhood, failed marriage, and dynamics behind the breakups of both his prior bands. He commented that the Smashing Pumpkins endured the departure of Wretzky, who he called "a mean spirited drug addict", only to break up in 2000 largely because of Iha's desire to leave the group. Corgan called his former Zwan bandmates Sweeney, Pajo and Lenchantin "dirty, filthy people who have no self-respect or class...never have I met such creatures who feel so entitled to all yet contribute so little, not only to my life but the culture and the world in general...the world is on the brink of wars and mass terror, and their main concern is whether or not their indy friends still like them."

In late 2004, Corgan published Blinking with Fists, a book of poetry. Despite mixed reviews, the book debuted on The New York Times Best Seller List. He had made his debut as a poet on September 17, 2003, presenting at the Art Institute of Chicago's Rubloff Auditorium.

Also in 2004, he began a solo music career, landing on an electronic/shoegaze/alternative rock sound for his first solo album, TheFutureEmbrace, co-produced and arranged by Bon Harris of Nitzer Ebb. Released on June 21, 2005, through Reprise Records, it garnered mixed reviews from the press and only sold 69,000 copies. Corgan toured behind his solo album with a touring band that included Linda Strawberry, Brian Liesegang and Matt Walker in 2005. This tour was not as extensive as previous Smashing Pumpkins or Zwan tours. The tour was also controversial in Australia, with Corgan antagonising the audience and storming off the stage when Smashing Pumpkins songs were yelled out as requests. Prior to recording TheFutureEmbrace, Corgan had recorded some 72 songs inspired by Chicago history for the largely acoustic ChicagoSongs project, which have yet to be released.

=== 2005–present: The Smashing Pumpkins revival ===
In 2005, Corgan took out a full-page ad in Chicago's two major newspapers (Chicago Tribune and The Chicago Sun-Times) revealing his desire to re-form the Smashing Pumpkins. Several days later, Jimmy Chamberlin accepted Corgan's offer for a reunion.

On April 20, 2006, the band's official website confirmed that the group was reuniting. The re-formed Smashing Pumpkins went into studio for much of 2006 and early 2007, and performed its first show in seven years on May 22, 2007, with new members Ginger Pooley (bass) and Jeff Schroeder (guitar) replacing Wretzky and Iha. The new album, titled Zeitgeist, was released in the United States on July 10, 2007, and debuted at No. 2 on the Billboard charts. Corgan and the rest of the Pumpkins toured extensively throughout 2007 and 2008, also releasing the EP American Gothic and the singles "G.L.O.W." and "Superchrist". Chamberlin left the band in March 2009, and Corgan chose to continue under the name.

In summer 2009, Corgan formed the band Spirits in the Sky to play a tribute concert to the late Sky Saxon of the Seeds. He toured with the band, composed of ex-Catherine member and "Superchrist" producer Kerry Brown, the Electric Prunes bassist Mark Tulin, Strawberry Alarm Clock keyboardist Mark Weitz, frequent Corgan collaborator Linda Strawberry, flautist Kevin Dippold, "Superchrist" violinist Ysanne Spevack, saxist Justin Norman, new Pumpkins drummer Mike Byrne, and Jane's Addiction guitarist Dave Navarro, playing covers and new Pumpkins material at several clubs in California. At the end of the tour, Corgan, Byrne, Tulin, and Brown headed back to Chicago to begin work on the new Smashing Pumpkins album, Teargarden by Kaleidyscope. The lineup at the time which included new bassist Nicole Fiorentino, toured through much of 2010, then spent 2011 recording the "album-within-an-album" Oceania and mounting tours of the United States and Europe. However, Byrne and Fiorentino would later leave the band in 2014.

On May 15, 2014, Corgan released AEGEA, a new solo record of experimental recordings he made in 2007. Limited to 250 vinyl copies, the album was mostly sold online, with a few copies sold at Madame Zuzu's, a tea house he owns and operates in Highland Park, a suburb northwest of Chicago. On July 25, 2014, Corgan also released the tapes from his "Siddhartha" show from March 2014, much in the vein of AEGEA. The set was expected to contain between 5 and 6 discs. During the summer 2014, he recorded the Smashing Pumpkins's ninth studio album, Monuments to an Elegy, with Tommy Lee and Jeff Schroeder. The album was released in early December 2014.

In October 2017, he released a new solo album titled Ogilala.

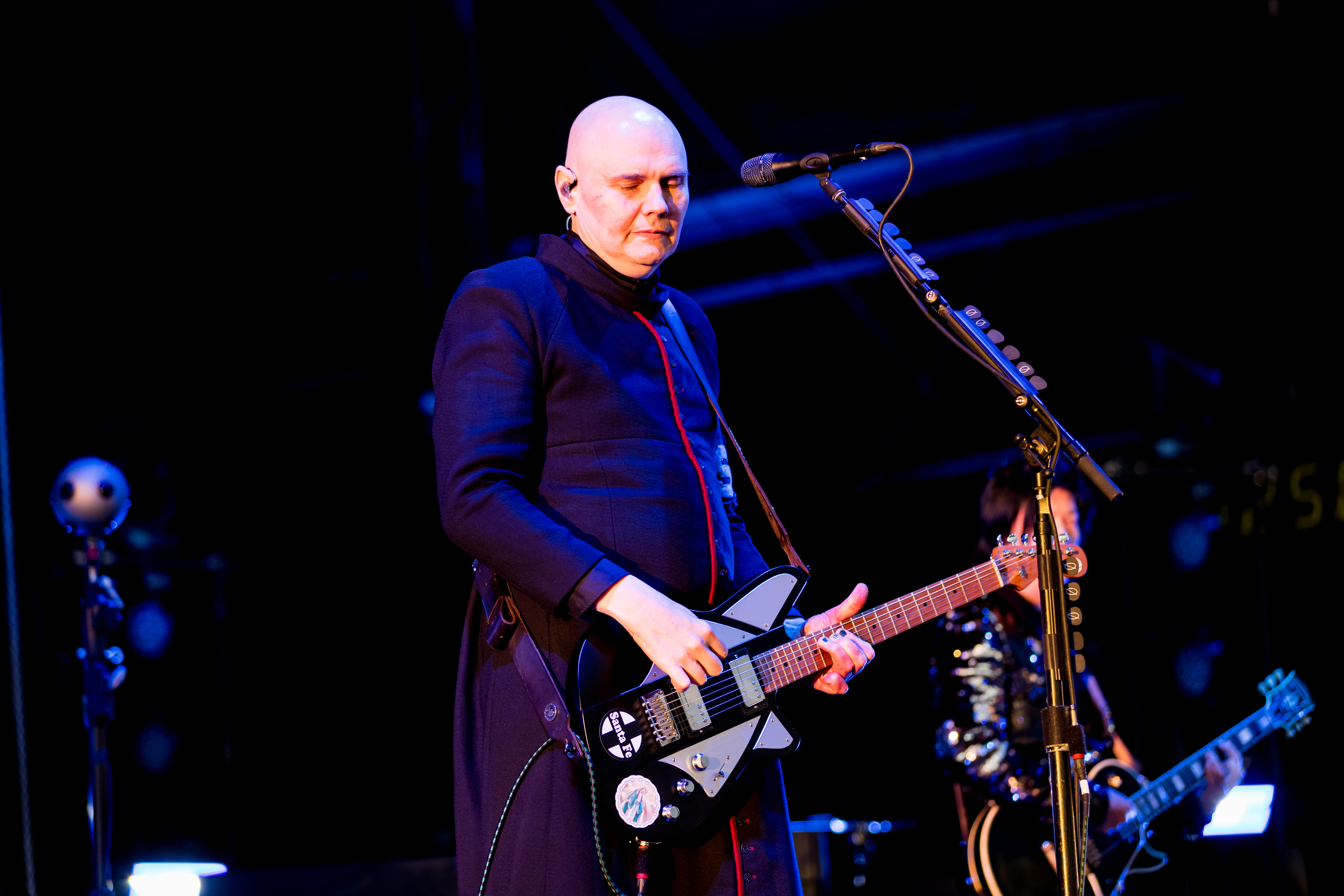
Corgan performing in 2019

In July 2018, the Smashing Pumpkins embarked on a reunion tour, the Shiny and Oh So Bright Tour, with a focus on performing material from their first five studio albums. The lineup consists of himself, James Iha, Jimmy Chamberlin, and Jeff Schroeder. Former bassist D'arcy Wretzky was not a part of the lineup, reportedly due to unresolved tension between her and Corgan. Wretzky has stated that Corgan offered her a contract but later retracted the offer, saying that "we also have to balance the forces at play... there is no room for error." After Wretzky released text messages between her and Corgan, a feud ensued, each party attacking each other with biting remarks.

On November 22, 2019, Corgan released his third solo album Cotillions, which he called "a labor of love". He also said, "This is absolutely an album from my heart." On July 14, 2022, he and his partner, Chloe Mendel, announced that they would host a livestream charity show on July 27 to benefit the victims of the July 4 Highland Park, Illinois, shooting.

== Professional wrestling career ==
=== ECW (1999–2000) ===
Billy Corgan sporadically made appearances for Extreme Championship Wrestling. In 2000, Corgan met with ECW owner Paul Heyman about investing in the company. Corgan declined.

=== Resistance Pro Wrestling (2011–2014) ===
In 2011, Corgan formed a Chicago-based independent wrestling promotion called Resistance Pro. Two years later, in 2013, he starred in a commercial for Walter E. Smithe Furniture, using the platform to promote his wrestling company.

In March 2014, it was reported that Corgan was in discussions with American television channel AMC to develop an unscripted reality series about Resistance Pro. The premise being a behind-the-scenes look at the promotion as Corgan "takes over creative direction for the independent wrestling company". The show was given the green light by AMC, under the working title of "Untitled Billy Corgan Wrestling Project," the same month.

=== Total Nonstop Action Wrestling (2015–2016) ===
In April 2015, Corgan became the new Senior Producer of Creative and Talent Development for Total Nonstop Action Wrestling (TNA), where his role was to "develop characters and create story lines", which he has called "a dream come true". In August 2016, Corgan took over as the promotion's new president.

In November 2016, Corgan had left TNA after disputes about not being paid on time, and subsequently, Anthem Sports & Entertainment Corp and Impact Ventures, parent company of TNA Impact Wrestling, provided a credit facility to TNA to fund operations. In 2016, he loaned money to Anthem Sports & Entertainment to fund TNA, and they promised to pay him back. On November 11, Corgan and Anthem signed a settlement, with Anthem repaying TNA's loan from Corgan.

Newly appointed TNA/Impact Wrestling President Ed Nordholm credits the invention of and the vision behind the Matt Hardy Broken gimmick to Jeremy Borash, David Lagana and Billy Corgan.

=== National Wrestling Alliance (2017–present) ===
In May 2017, Corgan purchased the National Wrestling Alliance (NWA), including its name, rights, trademarks and championship belts. Corgan's ownership took effect on October 1, 2017.

== Personal life ==
=== Mental health ===
For much of his life, Corgan has struggled with anxiety, depression, panic attacks, self-harm, obsessive–compulsive disorder, and suicidal ideation. He attributes these problems to the abuse he endured as a child at the hands of his father and stepmother, as well as other personal issues. He has since become an advocate for abuse support networks.

=== Involvement with sports ===
Corgan is an enthusiastic fan of the Chicago Cubs; he was also an occasional commentator on the team for late WXRT DJ Lin Brehmer. He has appeared at many Cubs games, occasionally throwing the ceremonial first pitch or singing "Take Me Out to the Ballgame". He is also a fan of the Chicago Bulls, Chicago Blackhawks and Chicago Bears, and became personal friends with Dennis Rodman and Chris Chelios. He is an avid professional wrestling fan, and appeared at an ECW event wielding an acoustic guitar as a weapon. In 2008, the Pumpkins song "Doomsday Clock" was used by ROH for promotional videos. On April 26, 2010, Corgan appeared on the SIRIUS Satellite Radio program Right After Wrestling with Arda Ocal to discuss his love for wrestling and the importance of unique theme songs for characters. On August 26, 2010, he took part in a storyline with AAA during a concert for MTV World Stage. As far as other entertainment, Corgan once commented that all he watches on TV are "sports and the Three Stooges". In March 2008, he was spotted in the crowd at the final day of a cricket test match between New Zealand and England.

=== Spiritual beliefs ===
Corgan identifies as Christian, though has mentioned that he accepts elements of Buddhism and Ken Wilber's spiritual ideas as well as gnosticism. In 2009, he launched Everything From Here to There, an interfaith website that is devoted to "Mind-Body-Soul" integration. He mentions praying each morning and night to be able to see through Jesus Christ's eyes and feel with his heart. An analysis of the symbolism of Corgan's lyrics considered the blend of beliefs he has cited in various interviews, which include ideas about religion, multiple dimensions, and psychic phenomena. In an interview on the Howard Stern Show, Corgan said he had an encounter with a person who had the ability to shapeshift, though he later stated it could have been a hallucination. In September 2026, during an episode of his podcast, The Magnificent Others, he told his guest, Michael Sweet of Stryper “I’m a Christian as well.”

=== Family ===
Corgan's mother Martha died in December 1996. The song "For Martha", from Adore, was written in her memory. In the early 2000s Corgan named his label Martha's Music after her as well. A picture of Martha as a young girl sitting on a fake moon at Riverview Park is featured on the flipside of the Siamese Dream booklet.

On December 19, 2021, Corgan's father, William Dale Corgan, died at age 74.

=== Romantic relationships ===
In 1991, Corgan briefly dated musician and actress Courtney Love. In an interview on The Howard Stern Show, Corgan confessed that he arranged for Love's band to stay in his Chicago apartment in order to meet her, an encounter he had longed for after seeing her photograph on the back of Hole's new single. Their relationship ended on October 12, 1991, when Love found out that Corgan had another relationship.

In 1993, Corgan married art conservator and artist Chris Fabian, his longtime on-again, off-again girlfriend. They were married at a small ceremony at his house in Wrigleyville. Corgan and Fabian separated in late 1995. Corgan filed for divorce in December 1996 on grounds of "irreconcilable differences," and the divorce was granted in 1997. Corgan refused to discuss the marriage for years, only allowing that it was "unhappy." In 2005 he described the circumstances of his marriage in depth via his personal blog.

In late 1995, Corgan started dating Ukrainian photographer Yelena Yemchuk, who later contributed to several Smashing Pumpkins videos and album art. He continued to date Yemchuk until around 2004. According to Corgan, his breakup with her contributed to the themes of his 2005 solo release TheFutureEmbrace.

In 2005, Corgan dated musician Emilie Autumn for a number of months. The pair collaborated on multiple occasions during this time, with Autumn providing vocals and violin on his solo album and costume for a supporting music video.

In early 2006, Corgan moved in with Courtney Love and her daughter Frances Bean Cobain. According to Love, he had his own wing in her Hollywood Hills mansion. Two years later, Love criticized him publicly over his alleged refusal to attend her daughter's sweet 16 party. After they parted ways, Corgan stated in a March 2010 interview, "I have no interest in supporting [Love] in any way, shape or form. You can't throw enough things down the abyss with a person like that." Shortly after, when her band's album Nobody's Daughter was released, Corgan used Twitter to post anger-filled rants against her in reference to two songs he had written, "Samantha" and "How Dirty Girls Get Clean", which ended up on the album without his permission. Love then wrote an apology to him on her Facebook account, but the feud continued. Corgan took to Twitter to rant against her again. She responded to him on Twitter, saying, "All i am is nice about you so if you wanna be mean be mean i don't feel anything. i have too much to feel dear." In 2008, he blamed his dedication to music for what he called "a bad marriage and seven bad girlfriends in a row". The two eventually reconciled, and Love was invited to perform at Smashing Pumpkins' 30th Anniversary Show. In 2020, Corgan told the Los Angeles Times that only a few people really matter to him and that Courtney is one of them, describing their relationship as a family bond.

In 2009, Corgan briefly dated reality TV actress Tila Tequila following their prior established friendship, accompanying her at the Bravo A-list Awards. He then was later linked with pop star Jessica Simpson. He started dating Australian singer Jessica Origliasso in 2010, and remained in a relationship with her until early June 2012. Origliasso blamed their split on their careers forcing them to spend too much time apart.

He has been in a relationship with Chloe Mendel since 2013. She was 19 when they met, Corgan was 44. He announced their marriage on September 17, 2023, during the 30th anniversary Siamese Dream show at Madame Zuzu's. They had wed the day before, on September 16. They have three children together, a son: Augustus Juppiter, born November 16, 2015, and two daughters: Philomena Clementine, born October 2, 2018, and Juno Delphine, born on March 18, 2025.

=== Political beliefs ===
In 1998, Corgan said that he had not participated in an election since 1992, when he voted for Bill Clinton. After the election of Barack Obama in 2008, Corgan said, "I'm very proud of my country right now for doing the right thing." He has since said that he was disappointed with Obama's presidency, and that he lacks faith in both major political parties. In 2009, he posted a transcript of a webcast by political activist Lyndon LaRouche to the official Smashing Pumpkins forum. On March 10, 2009, Corgan testified in front of Congress on behalf of the musicFIRST Coalition. He spoke in favor of H.R. 848, the Performance Rights Act, which gives musicians and artists their share of compensation when their music is played on radio stations.

In an interview with radio host and conspiracy theorist Alex Jones in 2016, Corgan voiced discontent with "social justice warriors", comparing them to Maoists, cult members, and the Ku Klux Klan, and calling their actions a threat to freedom of speech. In 2018, he called himself a "free-market libertarian capitalist".

=== Diet ===
Corgan adopted a pescetarian diet in 2013, and stated in 2017 that he had begun following a vegan and gluten-free diet. In 2012, he opened a Madame Zuzu's Tea House in the Ravinia neighborhood of Highland Park; the tea house closed in 2018 and reopened in a bigger space in downtown Highland Park in 2020.

== Collaborations ==
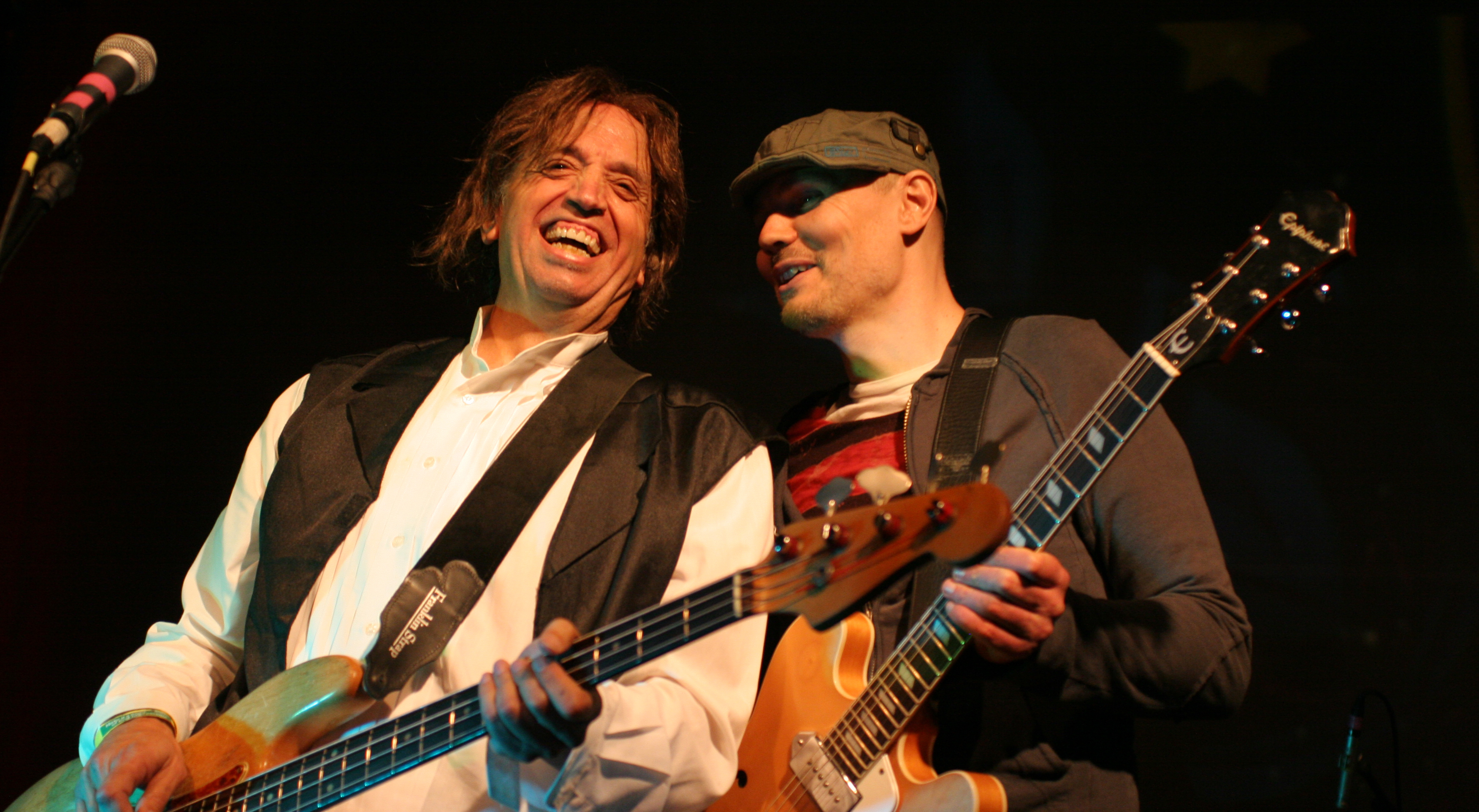
Corgan (right) performing with Mark Tulin of The Electric Prunes at a benefit concert for Sky Saxon

In addition to performing, Corgan has produced albums for Ric Ocasek, the Frogs, and Catherine. He shared songwriting credit on several songs on Hole's 1998 album Celebrity Skin; the title track became Corgan's second No. 1 modern rock hit. He also acted as a consultant for Marilyn Manson during the recording of the album Mechanical Animals. He has produced three soundtracks for the movies Ransom (1996), Stigmata (1999) and Spun (2002) in which he appeared as a doctor.

Corgan appeared at the 1996 Rock and Roll Hall of Fame ceremony to induct one of his biggest musical influences, Pink Floyd. He played acoustic guitar during the ceremony with Pink Floyd, when they performed their song "Wish You Were Here".

In particular, Corgan guided and collaborated with three bands in the 2000s—Breaking Benjamin (during sessions for 2004's We Are Not Alone), Taproot (for Blue-Sky Research, 2005), and Sky Saxon.

In 2010, Corgan claimed co-writing credit (with ex-girlfriend Courtney Love) on at least two of the songs on Hole's final album Nobody's Daughter and tried to assert a right of approval before the album could be released. Corgan had helped develop the album during its early stages. The album was released without the writing controversy ever being litigated or publicly resolved.

Corgan appeared as a guest vocalist on the song "Loki Cat" on Jimmy Chamberlin's first solo album, Life Begins Again, and Chamberlin played drums for the song "DIA" on Corgan's solo debut, where Robert Smith from the Cure teamed up with Corgan to do a cover of the Bee Gees' "To Love Somebody". In 2007, Corgan provided vocals on the Scorpions' song "The Cross", on their album Humanity: Hour I. In 2010 Corgan featured on Ray Davies' album See My Friends on the album's closer, a mash-up of the Kinks songs "All Day and All of the Night" and "Destroyer". He also contributed his guitar work on "Did You Miss Me" by the Veronicas. Corgan has also collaborated with Tony Iommi, Blindside, David Bowie (singing "All the Young Dudes" with Bowie at Bowie's 50th birthday party), New Order and Marianne Faithfull. Corgan has co-written several songs with Blue October frontman Justin Furstenfeld. So far two of their co-written compositions "Don't Say it Wasn't Love" and "Sobriety" have appeared on the Blue October albums Spinning The Truth Around Parts I and II, respectively.

In July 2025, Corgan performed as a member of the house band at Back to the Beginning, singing on covers of "Breaking the Law and "Snowblind".

== Musical style and influences ==
Corgan's guitar playing incorporates elements of heavy metal and grunge. His styles range from abrasive to melodic. He downtunes his guitar.

When asked in a 1994 Rolling Stone interview about his influences, Corgan replied:

Eight years old, I put on the Black Sabbath record, and my life is forever changed. It sounded so heavy. It rattled the bones. I wanted that feeling. With Bauhaus and the Cure, it was the ability to create a mood and an atmosphere. The air gets heavier. With Jimi Hendrix it was the ability to translate this other level of guitar. Cheap Trick—it was a vocal influence. Although Tom Petersson once told me that Rick Nielsen called us 'tuneless and nonmelodic.'

Corgan wrote six articles for Guitar World in 1995, and his solos for "Cherub Rock" and "Geek U.S.A." were included on their list of the top guitar solos of all time. AllMusic said "Starla" "proves that Corgan was one of the finest (and most underrated) rock guitarists of the '90s", while Rolling Stone called him and his Smashing Pumpkins bandmates "ruthless virtuosos". His solo for "Soma" was No. 24 on Rolling Stone's list of the top guitar solos. He is a fan of Eddie Van Halen and interviewed him in 1996 for Guitar World. Other guitarists Corgan rates highly include Uli Jon Roth, Tony Iommi, Ritchie Blackmore, Leslie West, Dimebag Darrell and Robin Trower.

His bass playing, which has featured on nearly every Smashing Pumpkins album, was influenced by post-punk figures like Peter Hook and Simon Gallup.

Corgan has praised Radiohead, saying "if they're not the best band in the world, then they're one of the best". He is also a fan of Pantera and appeared briefly in their home video 3 Watch It Go. Other favorites include Depeche Mode, Siouxsie and the Banshees, Rush, Pink Floyd, Led Zeppelin, Metallica, Slayer, Queen, Electric Light Orchestra, Dinosaur Jr., My Bloody Valentine, and Spiritualized. Corgan stated in 1997 that upon hearing the U2 song "New Year's Day", at 16, "[U2] quickly became the most important band in the world to me." Corgan particularly went out of his way to praise Rush in his interview for Rush: Beyond the Lighted Stage, a documentary on the band, where he criticized mainstream reviewers for consciously marginalizing the band and their influence, and highlighted the fact that many of his musical peers were influenced by Rush.

He has listed his artistic influences as William S. Burroughs, Pablo Picasso, Jimi Hendrix, Jack Kerouac, and Philip K. Dick.

== Instruments ==
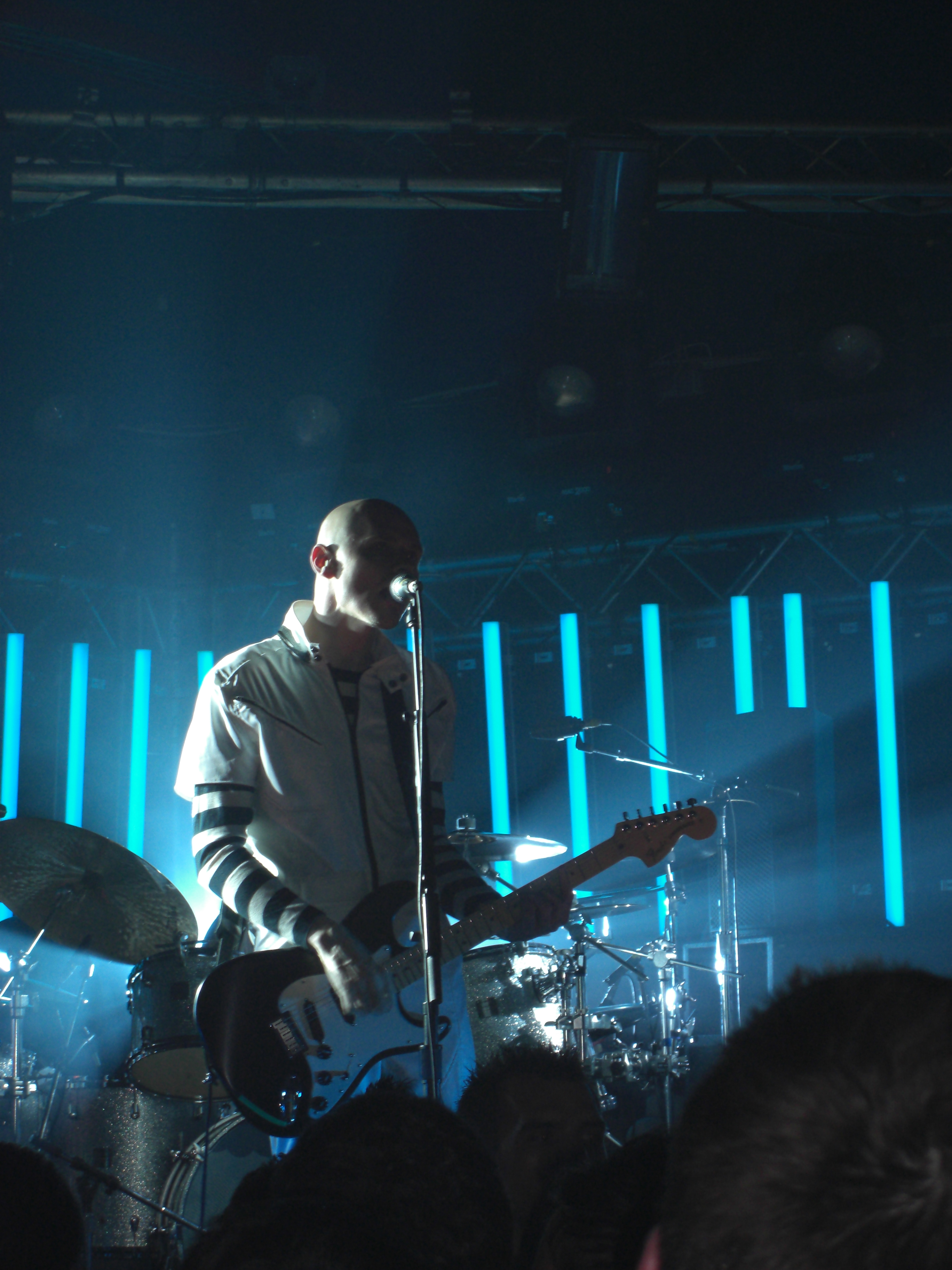
Corgan performing in 2007

During the Gish-Siamese Dream era, Corgan played a customized 1957 Reissue Fender Stratocaster equipped with three Fender Lace Sensor pickups (the Lace Sensor Blue in the neck position, the Lace Sensor Silver in the middle position, and the Lace Sensor Red at the bridge position). It also has a five-position pickup selector switch which he installed himself. This battered Strat became his number one guitar by default. He owned a 1974 Strat that was stolen shortly after Gish was completed. Corgan was reunited with this guitar in early 2019.

Corgan also used a wide variety of guitars on Mellon Collie and the Infinite Sadness. On "Where Boys Fear to Tread", Corgan used a Les Paul Junior Reissue, and on "Tonight Tonight" he used a 1972 Gibson ES-335. He is also known to use a 1974 Strat which has since been painted baby blue. That guitar was used on the recordings for "Bullet with Butterfly Wings" and also "Muzzle", because the heavier wood gave it the basic Strat sound with a bit more bottom. During the recording and tour of the album Zeitgeist, he used a Schecter C-1 EX baritone, finished in black with Tony Iommi signature pickups. Corgan endorsed Reverend Guitars in his Zwan era, most notably playing a Reverend Slingshot.

In 2008, Corgan released to the market his own Fender Stratocaster. This new guitar was made to Corgan's exact specs to create his famous mid-1990s buzzsaw tone; the instrument features three DiMarzio pickups (two custom for this instrument), a string-through hardtail bridge and a satin nitrocellulose lacquer finish. When playing live, he uses both his signature Strats as well as two other Fender Strats, one in red with a white pick guard and one in silver-grey with a black pick guard; a Gibson Tony Iommi signature SG; and his Schecter C-1 (only used on the Zeitgeist song "United States").

A video called "Stompland" on the official Smashing Pumpkins YouTube channel is informative about Corgan's choice of effects pedals. In the video he reveals an extensive collection of pedals used throughout his career with the Smashing Pumpkins. Corgan's tone is often characterized by his use of fuzz pedals, particularly vintage versions of the Electro-Harmonix Big Muff

In 2016, Reverend Guitars released the BC-1 Billy Corgan signature guitar featuring Railhammer Billy Corgan signature pickups. The Reverend Billy Corgan Signature Terz was launched at the 2018 NAMM Show—an electric version of a 19th-century instrument that is played as if the guitar is capoed at the third fret, and tuned G-g standard. Corgan often uses the capo at the third fret and asked for a higher-register guitar.

Corgan is noted for having used Marshall and Diezel amps. He has also used modular preamps based on many different amps in conjunction with Mesa Boogie poweramps. The preamps were custom built by Salvation Mods. In August 2017, he sold a large collection of instruments and gear used throughout his career via music gear website Reverb.

In 2020, Billy Corgan collaborated with Brian Carstens of Carstens Amplification to produce Grace, Corgan's first and only signature guitar amplifier to date.

== Discography ==
=== Albums ===
List of albums, with selected chart positions
Title	Album details	Peak chart positions										Sales
Title	Album details	US	AUS	FRA	GER	JPN	NLD	NZ	SWE	SWI	UK	Sales
TheFutureEmbrace	Released: June 21, 2005; Label: Reprise; Formats: CD, digital download	31	24	73	67	49	77	25	45	82	89	US: 69,000
Aegea	Released: May 5, 2014; Label: Martha's Music; Formats: LP	—	—	—	—	—	—	—	—	—	—	
Ogilala	Released: October 13, 2017; Label: Martha's Music/BMG; Formats: CD, digital download, LP	183	—	—	—	—	—	—	—	86	—	
Cotillions	Released: November 22, 2019; Label: Martha's Music; Formats: CD, digital download, LP	—	—	—	—	—	—	—	—	—	—	
"–" denotes a recording that did not chart or was not released in that territory.

=== Singles ===
List of singles, with selected chart positions
Title	Year	Peak chart positions	Album
Title	Year	UK	Album
"Walking Shade"	2005	74	TheFutureEmbrace
"Aeronaut"	2017	—	Ogilala
"The Spaniards"	2017	—	Ogilala
"—" denotes a recording that did not chart or was not released in that territory.

=== As featured artist ===
List of singles, with selected chart positions
Title	Year	Peak chart positions	Album
Title	Year	US Main. Rock	Album
"Take Shape" (with Code Orange)	2023	35	The Above
"—" denotes a recording that did not chart or was not released in that territory.

=== Soundtrack work ===
- 1996: Ransom
- 1997: First Love, Last Rites ("When I Was Born, I Was Bored")
- 1999: Stigmata
- 2000: Any Given Sunday (Corgan is credited on "Be A Man" by Hole)
- 2002: Spun (Corgan wrote original songs for this soundtrack)
- 2006: "Dance of the Dead" (episode of Masters of Horror)
- 2007: When a Man Falls in the Forest (three previously unreleased songs)
- 2011: The Chicago Code (Corgan performs the opening theme, written by Robert Duncan)
- 2018: Rampage – "The Rage" Performed by Kid Cudi featuring vocals by Corgan (from the Smashing Pumpkins track Bullet with Butterfly Wings)

=== Albums featured ===
- 1991: Sparkle (by Catherine, The EP is produced by Corgan)
- 1994: Songs About Girls (by Catherine, The song "It's No Lie" is produced by Corgan)
- 1994: Chante Des Chanson Sur Les Filles (by Catherine, The EP is produced by Corgan as "Johhny Goat")
- 1994: Sleepy EP (by Catherine, The EP is produced by Corgan)
- 1996: Guitars That Rule the World, Vol. 2: Smell the Fuzz:The Superstar Guitar Album (by Various Artists, Corgan is credited as writer and performer of "Ascendo")
- 1997: Starjob (by The Frogs, The EP is produced by Corgan as "Johhny Goat")
- 1997: Troublizing (by Ric Ocasek, Corgan is credited as writer of "Asia Minor" and playing guitar on "The Next Right Moment", "Crashland Consequence", "Situation", "Fix on You" and "People We Know")
- 1998: Celebrity Skin (by Hole, Corgan is credited as co-writer of "Celebrity Skin", "Hit So Hard", "Malibu", "Dying" and "Petals")
- 1998: "I Belong to You" single (by Lenny Kravitz, Corgan remixed the second track "If You Can't Say No (Flunky in the attic Mix)")
- 1998: Mechanical Animals by Marilyn Manson, Corgan performed backing vocals on Speed of Pain, although not credited, he is thanked in the album credits.
- 1999: Paraphernalia (by Enuff Z'Nuff, Corgan is credited as guitarist on the song "Everything Works If You Let It")
- 2000: Iommi (by Tony Iommi, Corgan is credited as writer of and vocalist/bassist/additional guitarist on "Black Oblivion")
- 2001: Get Ready (by New Order, Corgan is contributing voice on "Turn My Way")
- 2002: Kissin Time (by Marianne Faithfull, Corgan is credited as writer of "Wherever I Go", "I'm on Fire" and contributing on "Something Good")
- 2003: "Lights Out" single (by Lisa Marie Presley, Corgan is credited as writer of "Savior")
- 2004: We Are Not Alone (by Breaking Benjamin, Corgan is credited as writer of "Follow", "Forget It" and "Rain")
- 2004: The Essential Cheap Trick (by Cheap Trick, Corgan is playing guitar on the live recording of the track "Mandocello")
- 2004: About a Burning Fire (by Blindside, Corgan is playing guitar on "Hooray, It's L.A.")
- 2005: Life Begins Again (by Jimmy Chamberlin Complex, Corgan is contributing voice on "Loki Cat")
- 2005: Blue-Sky Research (by Taproot, Corgan wrote the track "Lost in the Woods" and co-wrote the tracks "Violent Seas" and "Promise")
- 2006: ONXRT:Live From The Archives Volume 9 (A compilation CD from the radio station 93 WXRT in Chicago features the live recording of the track "A100")
- 2007: Humanity: Hour I (by Scorpions, Corgan is contributing voice on "The Cross")
- 2010: Nobody's Daughter (by Hole, Corgan is credited as co-writer of "Pacific Coast Highway", "Samantha" and "Loser Dust")
- 2010: See My Friends (by Ray Davies, Corgan is featured in the song "All Day And All of the Night/Destroyer")
- 2011: Ghost on the Canvas (by Glen Campbell, Corgan is featured in the song "There's No Me... Without You")
- 2011: Fancy Space People (by Fancy Space People, Corgan is credited as engineer and playing guitar)
- 2014: Did You Miss Me (on The Veronicas by The Veronicas, guitar contributions)
- 2019: The Nothing (by Korn, Corgan is credited as co-writer of "You'll Never Find Me")
- 2019: Blvds of Splendor (by Cherie Currie, Corgan provides guitar, bass and Backing Vocals on "Blvds Of Splendor")
- 2019: Screamer (by Third Eye Blind, Corgan described as the "musical consigliere" of the album, and credited as co-writer of "Light It Up")
- 2020: Ceremony (by Phantogram, Corgan is credited as co-writer of "Into Happiness" and "Love Me Now")
- 2021: Bodies (by AFI, Corgan is credited as co-writer of "Dulcería")

== Awards ==
- Women's Wrestling Hall of Fame
  - WWHOF Award (1 time)
    - Historian Award (2025)
