= Cotillions (album) =

2019 studio album by William Patrick Corgan

Studio album by William Patrick Corgan
- Released: November 22, 2019
- Recorded: 2018–2019
- Genre: Americana
- Length: 62:05
- Label: Martha's Music; BMG
- Producer: Billy Corgan

William Patrick Corgan chronology
Ogilala (2017)	Cotillions (2019)

Professional ratings
Aggregate scores
Source	Rating
AnyDecentMusic?	6.3/10
Metacritic	68/100
Review scores
Source	Rating
Pitchfork	6.4/10
Consequence of Sound	B−
Kerrang!	3/5
NME	3/5

Cotillions is the third solo album by American musician and Smashing Pumpkins vocalist Billy Corgan (under his full name, William Patrick Corgan). It was released on November 22, 2019. The songs on the album were reportedly written in 2017 during a month-long journey Corgan took across America. There was enough material to allow for a 17-track double album. Corgan has said this album is a "true labor of love" in an Instagram post about Cotillions, expressing his gratitude towards his fans and his disdain of the mass media, while also being grateful of living in a "different world", where "an artist can speak directly to you without the filter of mass media shaping your heart and opinions before you've even had a chance to decide whether this music speaks to you."

== Track listing ==
Cotillions track listing
No.	Title	Length
1.	"To Scatter One's Own"	4:16
2.	"Hard Times"	3:12
3.	"Jubilee"	5:04
4.	"Fragile, the Spark"	2:43
5.	"Cotillions"	5:09
6.	"Faithless Darlin'"	3:01
7.	"Colosseum"	3:34
8.	"Martinets"	2:56
9.	"Buffalo Boys"	2:55
10.	"Dancehall"	4:33
11.	"Cri de Coeur"	3:56
12.	"Like Lambs"	3:39
13.	"Rider"	3:01
14.	"Apologia"	3:08
15.	"Neptulius"	4:09
16.	"6+7"	4:15
17.	"Anon"	2:08
Total length:		62:05
