= Yelena Yemchuk =

Ukrainian-American photographer (born 1970)

- Єлена Ємчук
- Born: 1970 (age 55–56); Kiev, Ukrainian SSR, Soviet Union (now Kyiv, Ukraine)
- Education: Parsons School of Design ArtCenter College of Design
- Occupations: Photographer, painter, film director
- Partner: Ebon Moss-Bachrach
- Children: 2
- Website: yelenayemchuk.com

Yelena Yemchuk (Note: Ukrainian: Єлена Ємчук, romanized: Yelena Yemchuk) (born 1970) is a Ukrainian-American photographer, painter and film director, best known for her work with The Smashing Pumpkins.

== Early life ==
Born in Kyiv, Ukraine to an athlete and a teacher, her family moved to Brooklyn, New York in 1981. Before immigrating to the United States, Yemchuk would spend her summers in a recreational area in Kyiv along the Dnieper River called Hidropark, which would later become the inspiration for her 2011 book by the same name. Yemchuk describes the area as a "Soviet version of Coney Island" during the summer when woods and waterfronts of the area are turned into a playground.

She studied at Parsons School of Design in New York City and at ArtCenter College of Design in Pasadena, CA.

Her interest in photography was sparked when her father gave her a camera for her fourteenth birthday.

== Career ==
Yemchuk directed or co-directed the videos for "Zero" and "Thirty-Three" by the Smashing Pumpkins. In addition, she handled art direction for the album Adore by the Smashing Pumpkins and its related singles. Her photographs appear in the "Zero" EP, The Aeroplane Flies High box set, and the Rotten Apples compilation. She received an art direction credit for the 2000 Smashing Pumpkins' album Machina/The Machines of God, and appeared in the video for the song "Stand Inside Your Love". She also provided the photography for albums by Savage Garden and Rufus Wainwright. Her fashion photography is featured in the September 2010 Urban Outfitters catalog.

She has exhibited her paintings at the Dactyl Foundation. Her paintings "displays her uniquely surrealist approach to art with satiric storytelling and undeniable Eastern European influences".

Her current focus on fashion photography began in 1997. Since then, Yemchuk has contributed to Italian and Japanese Vogue, The New Yorker and W, and has shot advertising campaigns for Kenzo, Cacharel and Dries Van Noten.

She was involved with Pumpkins frontman Billy Corgan from 1995 to about 2003. She also provided the cover art for his book Blinking with Fists.

In 2011, Yelena published her first book, Gidropark. This book allows audiences to see a more personal side of Yemchuk, given that most of her body of work revolves around portraiture and fashion photography. The photos published within the book were taken during the summers of 2005 through 2008. More recently, in 2021 she worked on the film Mabel, Betty and Bette, which explores "female archetypes of the Golden Age of Hollywood."

== Personal life ==
Yemchuck has two daughters with American actor Ebon Moss-Bachrach, who is best known for his roles in the Marvel Cinematic Universe movie The Fantastic Four: First Steps, HBO television series Girls and the Hulu series The Bear. Yemchuk and Moss-Bachrach currently reside in Brooklyn, N.Y.
