= Dactyl Foundation =

American nonprofit arts organization

Coordinates: 40°43′19.98″N 74°0′11.92″W

Dactyl Foundation is a 501 (c)(3) not-for-profit arts organization in New York City founded by New York-based artist Neil Grayson and novelist/philosopher of science V.N. Alexander.

== History ==
Founded in 1997 in the "evening of the postmodern day," Dactyl Foundation supports an aesthetic that is informed by science, history, and philosophy. Dactyl hosts visual art exhibitions, readings, screenings, and performances, which are supplemented with research, conferences and lectures, "bringing the sciences back into the arts." Dactyl Review is a 2.0 literary fiction review site created for and by the literary fiction community and offers a $1,000 annual prize for a novel or collection of short stories.

== Notable projects ==
- 1998 Stephen Jay Gould, Lecture hosted by The Antioch Review.
- 1998 "One Painting & Drawings" with artist Judy Glantzman.
- 2000 "Chaos in Literature, Science and Art" with James P. Crutchfield.
- 2001 "Paintings & Drawings" with artist Judy Glantzman.
- 2001 "History, Memory, Trauma," Lecture by Dominick LaCapra, recipient of the Dactyl award for aesthetic theory, September 28, 2001.
- 2002 "Phenomena+Existence No. 1" with artist Yelena Yemchuk.
- 2003 "Paintings, Monoprints & Drawings" with artist Judy Glantzman.
- 2005 Poetics-Cognitive Science Colloquy with speakers John Ashbery, Angus Fletcher, Walter J. Freeman, Rebecca Goldstein and Steven Pinker.
- 2004 "Dreamreaders" with artist Yelena Yemchuk.
- 2006 Fredo Viola, debut live performance.
- 2006 Society for Science, Literature and the Arts 20th Annual Conference, co-hosted with the Center for Inquiry with speakers Lynn Margulis, Dorion Sagan, Jesper Hoffmeyer, Donald Favareau, Eric Schneider, and Neil deGrasse Tyson.
- 2007 "FTW" with artist Sage Vaughn
- 2007 "Closed Casket," with street artist Neck Face.
- 2008 "Dialogues," art exhibition featuring Picasso, Goya, Max Ernst, Victor Hugo, Monet and other classic, Modern and contemporary masters, curated by Jan Krugier. This was Krugier's last exhibition.
- 2009 "Thirty-Year Retrospective" with artist Judy Glantzman.
- 2009 Helena Christensen, United Nations, photography exhibition
- 2010 Norman Lock's ShadowPlay receives Dactyl Foundation Literary Award.
- 2010 photography by Helena Christensen for the Chernobyl Children's Project International
- 2011 11th annual Gathering in Biosemiotics at Rockefeller University
- 2011 David Schmahmann's The Double Life of Alfred Buber receives Dactyl Foundation Literary Award
- 2013 Lindsay Hill's Sea of Hooks receives Dactyl Foundation Literary Award
- 2016 Millbrook Literary Festival, Millbrook, NY
