= War Tapes =

American rock band

- Origin: Los Angeles, California, United States
- Genres: Indie rock, post-punk, new wave
- Years active: 2004–present
- Labels: Sarathan
- Members: Neil Popkin; Becca Popkin; Matthew Bennett; William Mohler
- Website: wartapesband.com

War Tapes is an American rock band formed in Los Angeles, California, in 2004. The band has played shows and toured across the US and in the UK with The Smashing Pumpkins, Tiger Army, Shiny Toy Guns, Moving Units, The Bravery, Longwave, VNV Nation, She Wants Revenge, Mark Burgess of The Chameleons, Elefant, Jonathan Richman, and The Unseen. Their songs "Dreaming of You" and "The Night Unfolds" were featured on Last Call with Carson Daly; the song "Mind Is Ugly" was featured on a Season 5 episode of the MTV series The Hills, and the band also performed on the season 2 finale of the ABC Family show Greek. They define their sound as: "Heart-Quaking Doom Pop" and they released their first album, The Continental Divide in May 2009.

== History ==
=== Formation and debut EP (2006–2008) ===
The band is composed of brother and sister Neil and Becca Popkin, Matthew Bennett, and William Mohler. Neil and Becca originally hail from Boston, Matt was born in Hawaii, and William was born in Southern California. Recently, the band added longtime friend Ian Sterling Smith, formerly of Sleepmask, to play during live performances. The band was formed in Downtown Los Angeles in 2004 (according to their Myspace page), and they made their live debut in 2006. The band played anywhere they could get booked, including warehouse parties and small punk clubs, and also some higher profile venues like The Wiltern, the Bowery Ballroom and The Warfield. The band arguably played its biggest show in San Francisco in 2007, opening for the reformed Smashing Pumpkins at the Fillmore. According to Neil, it also marked a turning point in the band. He stated: "...To see how hard they (Smashing Pumpkins) worked and how much they rehearsed, we decided we needed to step it up." After more touring and shows the band released a six-song, self-titled EP at the end of 2008.

=== The Continental Divide & acoustic EP (2009) ===
War Tapes closed out the year with more live performances in the Los Angeles area and in early 2009, they completed work on their debut LP, The Continental Divide. Four songs off of their EP were remixed and remastered for The Continental Divide. The entire record was written and recorded in Los Angeles, mostly at Regime Studios. William also serves as the band's producer. In the 11 weeks leading up to the release, the band debuted one new song on their Myspace page every Sunday at midnight. The record was released on May 26, 2009. The band then held two CD release parties, one at Club Moscow in Hollywood, CA, and another in Orange County, California. The album has received several positive reviews from websites including: Ripplemusic, Indiemusicnews, Indieblips, Shakefire.com, and Post-Punk.com.

Although The Continental Divide has been out for a little over a year, Neil has stated that a second album's worth of material is already completed.

On November 20, 2009, the band released a new EP entitled Turtles, featuring acoustic versions of songs from their previous releases plus a cover of "Illusion" by VNV Nation. Between December 1 and December 31 proceeds from the album went to PETA.

=== Tour with VNV Nation and television appearances (2009) ===
War Tapes accompanied futurepop band VNV Nation on a 23-date tour across North America. The first show was held at the Nokia Theatre in L.A. on June 26, 2009, and it ended at the Marquee in Phoenix, Arizona on July 30, 2009.

The songs "Dreaming Of You" and "The Night Unfolds" featured on Last Call With Carson Daly, and the song "Mind Is Ugly" was featured on the MTV series The Hills, in the Season 5 episode entitled "Play Mates Bring The Drama". The band also performed on the ABC Family television series Greek in the season 2 finale "At World's End" on June 15, 2009.

=== Fever Changing ===
On October 19, 2010 War Tapes released their EP entitled "Fever Changing" which features five brand-new songs. War Tapes offers this EP for free or allows people to donate what they want for the music through the website BandCamp.com More music is in the works and War Tapes plans on releasing another EP before the end of 2010.

== Musical style ==
War Tapes define their sound as "Heart-Quaking Doom Pop", at times being compared to The Cure, Depeche Mode, and Joy Division. However, the band themselves have stated they are inspired more by bands that they don't actually sound like. Becca is a classically trained pianist and guitarist. William was trained in jazz bass and guitar, while Matt played in several shoegaze and punk bands before joining War Tapes. Becca and William had also never played (bass and drums, respectively) in a band before booking their first gig in 2006. Neil states that although he did musical theatre back in High School, his voice was still highly undeveloped upon the band's inception. He took vocal lessons and continuously practiced to improve.

== Band members ==
- Neil Popkin – vocals, rhythm guitar
- Becca Popkin – bass, backing vocals, piano
- Matthew Bennett – lead guitars
- Billy Mohler – drums, production
- Ian Sterling Smith - keyboards, guitar, percussion, shakerbitch (during live performances)

== Discography ==
Studio albums

- 2009: The Continental Divide

EPs

- 2008: War Tapes
- 2009: Turtles
- 2010: "Fever Changing"

Music videos

- "Mind Is Ugly"
- "Dreaming Of You"
- "The Night Unfolds"
- "Illusion"
- "Sheets Unknown"
