= Jan Krugier =

Polish-Swiss art dealer (1928–2008)

Janick "Jan" Krugier (12 May 1928 in Radom, Poland – 16 November 2008 in Geneva, Switzerland) was a Polish born Swiss dealer in modern art most known for his relationship to the works of Pablo Picasso and a survivor of the Holocaust.

== Life ==
Krugier was raised by his father (his mother died when he was five), who made his living representing mining companies but whose passion was French art. At home, the dealer remembered, there were “bad Impressionists, lots of Utrillos.”

During World War II he served as a member of the Polish Resistance, was captured and then sent to Auschwitz. Following the cessation of conflict Krugier studied art with Johannes Itten. He then moved to Paris in 1947 in order to paint but abandoned his dream of a career as artist to open a gallery. The gallerist later attributed his decision to being pushed in that direction by the artists Alberto Giacometti and Henri Matisse. It was in 1966 in Geneva that he finally realized this goal and opened his inaugural space. "Krugier was the first gallerist to stage an exhibition of Pablo Picasso’s work following the artist’s death in 1973."

== Art dealer ==
Krugier was the exclusive dealer for the works by Pablo Picasso inherited by his granddaughter Marina Picasso and of the works of Joaquín Torres-García from the collection of his grandchildren. He also had close business ties to the Swiss artists Alberto Giacometti and Balthus. His gallery also represented works by Francis Bacon, Balthus, Jean-Michel Basquiat, Pierre Bonnard, Georges Braque, Alexander Calder, Paul Cézanne, Marc Chagall, Edgar Degas, Eugène Delacroix, Jean Dubuffet, Max Ernst, Théodore Géricault, Alberto Giacometti, Phillip Guston, Victor Hugo, Paul Klee, Franz Kline, Wifredo Lam, Henri Matisse, Giorgio Morandi, Zoran Music, Odilon Redon, Germaine Richier, Georges Seurat, Paul Signac, Yves Tanguy, J.M.W. Turner and Édouard Vuillard, among others.

"What distinguished Krugier — who had been in the business since the days when he sat at a café table with Alberto Giacometti and Jean Dubuffet — was a staying power that his compeers didn’t share. “He was part of a tiny, tiny sliver — Andre Emmerich, Stephen Hahn, Klaus Perls, Eugene V. Thaw, Ernst Beyeler,” says the New York-based prints and drawings dealer David Tunick, citing giants of the trade from Krugier’s generation, who are all either retired or deceased. And none of them showed (or sold) the range of work that he did: Picasso, Cézanne, Klee, Giacometti and other modern greats; an elite selection of contemporaries, including the Chinese painter Zao Wou-Ki; plus antiquities and tribal art once consigned to the category “primitive.” (You didn’t find installations at his galleries, or video or much photography.)"

However, Krugier's final exhibition at Dactyl Foundation entitled "Diologues," featured an installation of the last palette and painting table used by Picasso. Before the close of the exhibition, he "died at age 80.., the art world lost the final remaining member of the generation of postwar connoisseur-dealers." Krugier amassed an important private collection of impressionist and modern art works from which were auctioned off by Christies in New York City in 2013 and by Sotheby's in London in 2014.
