= The Drowning Men =

American rock group

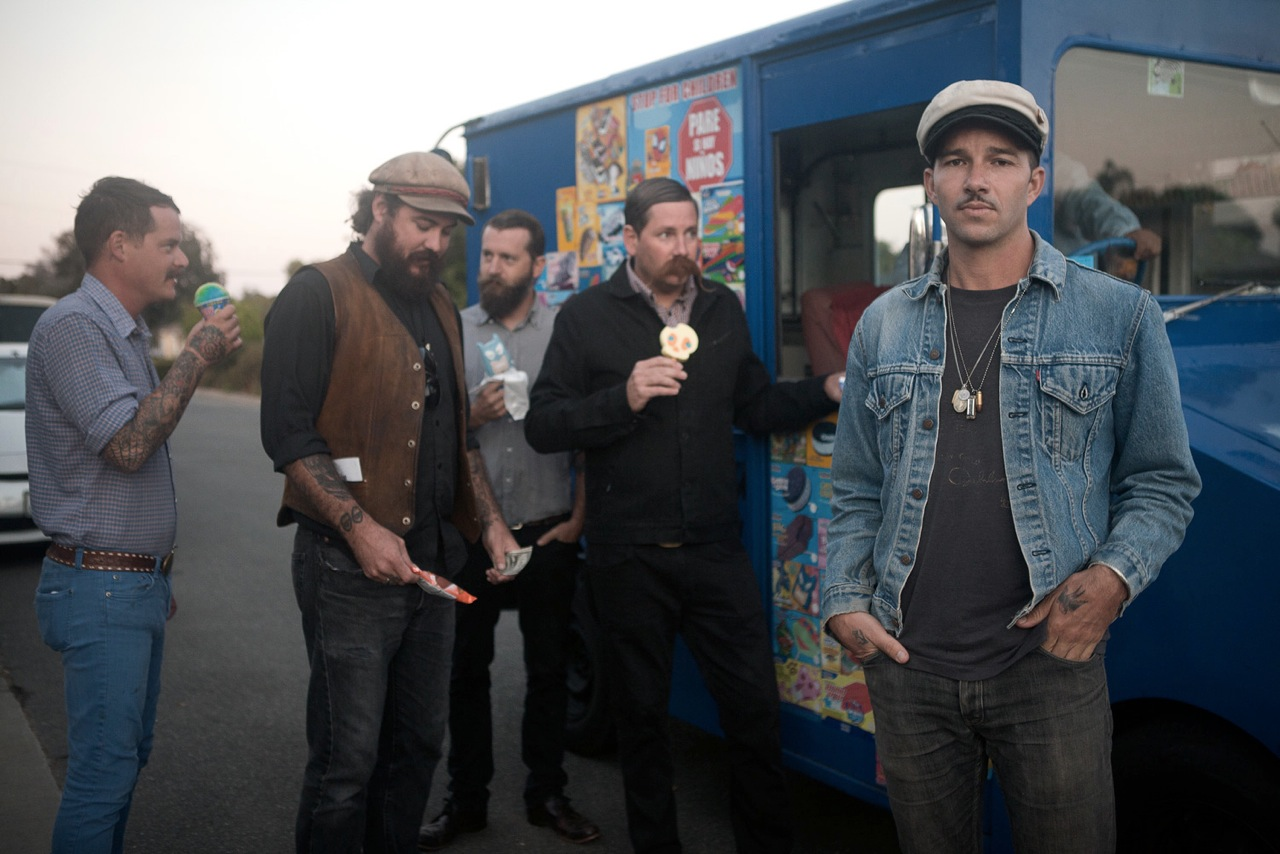
The Drowning Men

The Drowning Men is an American indie-rock quintet from Oceanside, California. The members are Nato Bardeen (vocals, keyboards, guitar, mandolin), James Smith (lead guitar, vocals), Todd Eisenkerch (bass, vocals), Rory Dolan (percussion), and Gabelani Messer (keyboards, vocals).

== Band formation ==
Based upon the songwriting of Nathan (Nato) Bardeen, the band was formed by Bardeen, as well as close friends, Rory, James, and original bass player Jason Young, in April 2005. The unnamed group played their first show in late 2005. As the band began to pick up momentum from songwriting and shows, Jay's position at the up-and-coming clothing company Brixton called for most of his daily attention. Shortly after, Jay left the band to focus on the clothing line. Todd Eisenkerch, a childhood friend of the members, and guitar player of another band Bardeen had played and sung in, The Plug Uglies, (who were now defunct) was positioned to play bass. Drummer Rory described the rehearsal where Todd was recruited: "Todd was hanging out with us when Jay left, we handed him a bass and said "looks like you're the new bass player". Todd obliged and has been a member since that day. Additional multi-instrumental Gabe Messer was added to the band after their initial E.P. Kill The Matador was released, as well as their first full album, Beheading of the Songbird, and as the band was continuing to work on various songs for their next record. Messer added additional talent as well as layers to the sound of previous songs and songs they continued to work on, primary adding the playing of various keys.

== Finding a name ==
Having a handful of shows under their belt, and a number of songs for a set, the band still had no name. As the band discussed potential names, Nato always had one that stuck in his head, he mentioned it to the other members, and the band agreed that "The Drowning Men" seemed to fit perfectly (Nato credits Nick Cave's poetry book And the Ass Saw the Angel).

== Evolutions ==
2006 saw the band's first show as The Drowning Men. The show took place at the Kensington Club in Kensington, San Diego, California. The band continued playing local shows, occasionally venturing out beyond their immediate area. In 2007, the band recorded the Kill The Matador EP.

In 2008, while banking, Nato struck up a conversation with bank teller Ryan Morgan. During the conversation, Ryan told Nato he was a trained pianist/keyboard player. After a successful try out the band asked Ryan to join them. Already a working band with shows booked, the band moved forward, and the sound evolved through interludes, multiple harmonies, and a new dynamic. In 2010 Ryan, also college student, decided to finish his college career and resigned from the band.

Seeking a replacement, the band thought of a local multi-instrumentalist, Gabe Messer. Gabe was a natural musician and he shared the same musical and local background as the members. Gabe had mixed the band a number of times as the house engineer for Hensley's Pub.

== Albums ==
The band has released the 2007 EP Kill the Matador, the 2009 Pall Jenkins produced LP Beheading of the Song Bird, and, in 2012, All Of The Unknown.

== Tours ==
The Drowning Men opened the Green 17 2011 Tour for Moneybrother and Flogging Molly. The band also supported Flogging Molly on two legs of US touring. The band opened Alkaline Trio's 15th Anniversary tour on the East Coast of the US in mid-2011. Later that year, the band supported the Airborne Toxic Event. The band toured the west coast with Memphis, TN's Lucero in early 2012.

The band began recording their sophomore album with producer Billy Mohler in 2011. Together, the band and producer crafted the music that would later become the record All Of The Unknown, through March 2012. After a courting period with indie and major labels alike, The Drowning Men signed with LA indie label Borstal Beat Records. Borstal Beat re-released The Drowning Men's 2009 album, Beheading Of The Songbird on October 25, 2011, followed by the band's next All Of The Unknown on July 17, 2012.

The band supported The Airborne Toxic Event on their 2013 European Tour.

== Discography ==
- Kill The Matador - (2007)
- Beheading Of The Songbird - (2009)
- All Of The Unknown - (2012)
