= Two Loons for Tea =

Musical duo

Background information
- Origin: Seattle, Washington, USA
- Genres: Indie pop; alternative rock; jazz; downtempo; trip hop
- Years active: 1999–present
- Labels: Sarathan Records
- Members: Sarah Scott, Jonathan Kochmer
- Website: twoloons.com

Two Loons for Tea are a musical duo consisting of singer Sarah Scott and instrumentalist Jonathan Kochmer. Formed in Seattle in 1999, they have released three albums on Sarathan Records. Their first album was an eponymous release in 2001, followed by Looking for Landmarks in 2002. In 2007 they released Nine Lucid Dreams, which was nominated for best pop/rock album of 2008 in the Independent Music Awards.

== Critical response ==
Two Loons for Tea have gotten significant critical attention, particularly since the release of Nine Lucid Dreams. According to CD Universe, they are "... stylistically diverse -- ranging from pop, trip-hop, rock, jazz and drum n' bass [but] there is a distinct and consistent essence that is immediately identifiable as 'the Two Loons for Tea sound': sensuous, moody, cinematic, and emotionally compelling."

According to Under the Gun Review, their sound "...is not the most original concept to come out of the musical woodwork, but it is for sure something to notice. Sarah Scott and Jonathon Kochman flawlessy weave indie pop simplicity with thick jazz grooves to mold a sound that is hard to deny as anything less than stunning."

Properly Chilled summarizes their sound as "Sexy, just too sexy to even mention, almost erotic, really! ... [the music] brings in a bagful of styles from the jazzy ambience to the trip-hopped folk rock. ... Two Loons for Tea will end up setting the mood for beautiful, sunny afternoons spent in the park with the headphones on".

Yahoo Music Blogs described them as "... like some mad Nashville duo lost on planet chill, or perhaps they're Victorian dancehall entertainers forecasting a successful Vaudeville career for their as yet unborn but talented children. ... Scott sings with a sassy impertinence that recalls dark heroines from Dinah Washington and Rickie Lee Jones to Beth Gibbons, while Kochmer's stylized arrangements recall Zero 7, Air and a touch of Massive Attack. It's vibrant cocktail electronica for the 7pm set, feelgood music for the modern urban sophisticate".

== Discography ==
- Two Loons for Tea (2001)
- Looking for Landmarks (2002)
- Nine Lucid Dreams (2007)
