= California Sober =

California Sober may refer to:

- Being "California sober", which refers to sobriety excluding the use of cannabis.
- "California Sober", a 2021 song by Demi Lovato from the album Dancing with the Devil... the Art of Starting Over
- "California Sober", a 2024 song by Post Malone featuring Chris Stapleton from the album F-1 Trillion
- "California Sober", a 2023 single by Billy Strings featuring Willie Nelson
- "California Sober", a 2024 song by Yours Truly from the album Toxic
