= Performance Rights Act =

Legislation in the United States

- Long title: A bill to provide fair compensation to artists for use of their sound recordings.
- Acronyms (colloquial): Performance Rights Act

Legislative history
- Introduced in the Senate as S.379 by Patrick Leahy (D–VT) on October 15, 2009; Committee consideration by Committee on the Judiciary

On February 4, 2009, Congressman John Conyers, Jr. introduced H.R. 848, the Performance Rights Act in the U.S. House of Representatives, 111th Congress. The Bill was referred to the House Judiciary Committee and on December 14, 2010, it was placed on the Union Calendar, Calendar No. 405. Under this Bill's version, performance rights was broadly designed to protect the civil rights of minority, religious, rural, and small communities with components to public access and education.

Musician George Clinton has spearheaded the H.R. 848 initiative through his foundation, Mothership Connection Education Foundation, with public awareness educational campaigns on copyright recapturing and reclaiming royalties for children of civil rights era musical performers.

The Performance Rights Act is an amendment to United States copyright law proposed by Senator Patrick Leahy. The bill would expand the protection for public performances of copyrighted sound recordings.

Under the Digital Performance Right in Sound Recordings Act, sound recordings have a limited public performance right in digital transmissions, such as webcasting. This bill would expand the performance right to cover terrestrial broadcasts, such as AM/FM radio. The bill is both strongly contested and supported. Artists who support the bill argue that it properly compensates performing artists. Broadcasters who oppose the bill argue that the performance right is unnecessary and overly burdensome.

== Previous Bills ==
In 2007, Howard Berman proposed legislation (H.R.4789) entitled the Performing Rights Act. That bill included a provision to establish a flat fee for non-profit radio stations, or stations that make less than $1.25 million in gross revenue. Still, broadcasters opposed this bill because of the potential increase in transaction costs for operating a radio station.
