= Frank Catalano =

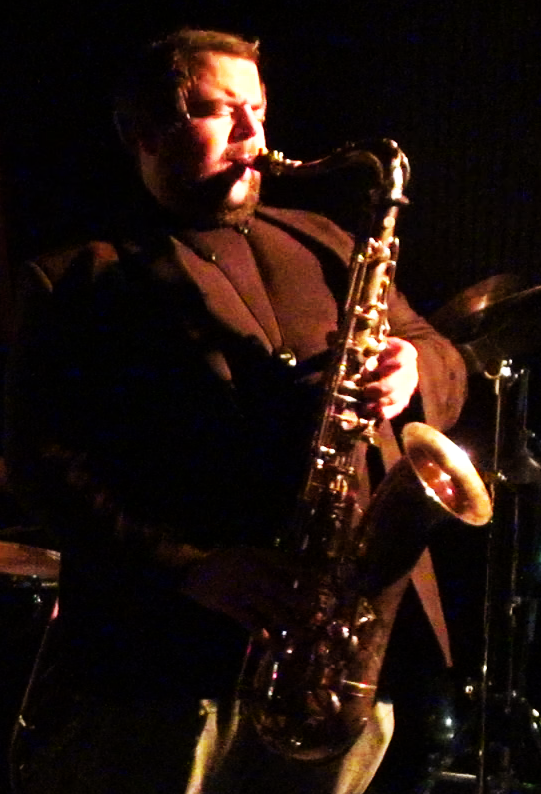

Background information
- Born: March 12, 1977 (age 49); Chicago, Illinois, U.S.
- Genres: Jazz
- Occupation: Musician
- Instrument: Saxophone
- Years active: 1987–present
- Labels: Lake Shore, Delmark, Savoy, Ropeadope
- Website: catalanomusic.com

Frank Catalano is an American jazz saxophonist.

== Biography ==
Frank Catalano began playing saxophone at age 7. When he was 16, his right middle finger was severed while working on a car engine. Following reconstructive surgery, he forced his hands to relearn his technique. When he was 18, he toured with the rock band Santana, then signed with Delmark to record his first solo album, Cut it Out (1988), with trumpeter Ira Sullivan.

Cut It Out was chosen for album of the year lists by the Chicago Tribune, Los Angeles Weekly, and JazzTimes. Catalano has worked with Louie Bellson, Tony Bennett, Randy Brecker, Charles Earland, Kenny Loggins, Jimmy McGriff, Arturo Sandoval, Johnny "Hammond" Smith, and Clark Terry. He recorded Bye Bye Blackbird with David Sanborn and Jimmy Chamberlin of the Smashing Pumpkins.

While recording with Ministry in 1999, Catalano was inspired by the band's use of sampling and engineered a sampling keyboard attachment for the saxophone. His device was patented on December 11, 2001, on the second anniversary of the death of his mentor, Charles Earland.

His albums include You Talkin to Me?!, which features a tandem tenor session with Von Freeman, and Live at the Green Mill with Randy Brecker on trumpet. Mighty Burner debuted at No. 11 on the Billboard sales chart, while Bang debuted at No. 12.

== Discography ==
- Cut It Out!?! (Delmark, 1998)
- Pins 'n' Needles (Chicago Lakeside Jazz, 1999)
- You Talkin' To Me?! with Von Freeman (Delmark, 2000)
- Live at the Green Mill (Delmark, 2001)
- Mighty Burner (Bright, 2006)
- Bang! (Savoy, 2008)
- Topics of Conversation with Paul Wertico (Blue Sky Fable, 2013)
- God's Gonna Cut You Down (Ropeadope, 2015)
- Bye Bye Blackbird (Ropeadope, 2016)
- Tokyo No. 9 (Ropeadope, 2017)
- Set Me Free with Lurrie Bell (Self-produced, 2024)
