= Sarathan Records =

Record label

- Founded: 2005
- Founder: Jonathan Kochmer
- Genre: Indie rock
- Country of origin: United States
- Location: Seattle, Washington
- Official website: www.sarathan.com

Sarathan Records is an indie rock record label based in Seattle, Washington. The label was formed in 2005 by Jonathan Kochmer, a member of indie band Two Loons For Tea.

== Artists ==
- Airpushers
- Shane Bartell
- Chrisopher Blue
- The Purrs
- Sensation Junkies
- Abra Moore
- Lisbeth Scott
- Jason Trachtenburg
- Trachtenburg Family Slideshow Players
- Two Loons For Tea
- Peter Bradley Adams
- Feral Children
- War Tapes

== See also ==
- List of record labels
