= Ogilala =

Studio album by William Patrick Corgan
- Released: October 13, 2017
- Recorded: 2016–2017
- Studio: Shangri-La Recording Studio in Malibu, California, United States
- Genre: Folk; acoustic rock
- Length: 38:32
- Label: Martha's Music; BMG
- Producer: Rick Rubin; Billy Corgan

William Patrick Corgan chronology
AEGEA (2014)	Ogilala (2017)	Cotillions (2019)

Singles from Ogilala
- 1. "Aeronaut" Released: August 22, 2017; 2. "The Spaniards" Released: September 29, 2017

Professional ratings
Aggregate scores
Source	Rating
Metacritic	70/100
Review scores
Source	Rating
AllMusic	3.5/5 stars
The A.V. Club	C+
Clash Music	7/10
Consequence of Sound	B−
DIY Magazine	4/5 stars
Pitchfork	5.7/10
Record Collector	2/5 stars

Ogilala (/ɔːɡiːlɑːlɑː/) is the second solo album by American musician Billy Corgan (under his full name, William Patrick Corgan), frontman of alternative rock band The Smashing Pumpkins. The album was released on October 13, 2017, in the United States. It marks Corgan's first solo album since his 2005 debut, TheFutureEmbrace. The album was co-produced by Corgan with Rick Rubin, and does not feature Corgan's longtime collaborator Bjorn Thorsrud. "Aeronaut" preceded the record as its lead single, with a US tour beginning the day after the record's release.

The album's songs are primarily acoustic and are predominantly performed on acoustic guitar, piano and strings, contrasting with much of Corgan's other work, as well as his debut solo album. The song "Processional" marked the first time since the Smashing Pumpkins' initial break-up in 2000 that Corgan had collaborated with the band's founding guitarist James Iha.

== Track listing ==
All tracks are written by Billy Corgan.

Ogilala track listing
No.	Title	Length
1.	"Zowie"	2:41
2.	"Processional"	3:55
3.	"The Spaniards"	4:08
4.	"Aeronaut"	3:40
5.	"The Long Goodbye"	2:43
6.	"Half-Life of an Autodidact"	3:27
7.	"Amarinthe"	3:54
8.	"Antietam"	3:16
9.	"Mandarynne"	3:56
10.	"Shiloh"	3:11
11.	"Archer"	3:41
Total length:		38:32

Some tracks are cross-faded in the physical version, thus reducing the playing time of the album about 20 seconds.

== Personnel ==
- Billy Corgan (as William Patrick Corgan) – vocals, acoustic & electric guitars, piano, Mellotron, photography, production
- James Iha – guitar and Mellotron on "Processional"
- Sierra Swan – occasional backing vocals
- Rick Rubin – production

== Charts ==
Chart (2017)	Peak position
New Zealand Heatseeker Albums (RMNZ)	7
Swiss Albums (Schweizer Hitparade)	86
US Billboard 200	183
