= Zwan =

American alternative rock band

- Zwan in 2003. Left to right: David Pajo, Billy Corgan, Matt Sweeney, Paz Lenchantin, and Jimmy Chamberlin.

Background information
- Also known as: The True Poets of Zwan, Djali Zwan (acoustic)
- Origin: Chicago, Illinois and Los Angeles, California, U.S.
- Genres: Alternative rock; pop rock; power pop
- Years active: 2001–2003
- Label: Reprise
- Spinoff of: The Smashing Pumpkins, Slint, A Perfect Circle, Chavez
- Past members: Billy Corgan; Matt Sweeney; Jimmy Chamberlin; David Pajo; Paz Lenchantin

Zwan was an American alternative rock supergroup formed in 2001 by lead guitarist/vocalist Billy Corgan and drummer Jimmy Chamberlin (both of the Smashing Pumpkins). Other members included bassist Paz Lenchantin (A Perfect Circle), plus guitarists David Pajo (Slint) and Matt Sweeney (Chavez). The band released only one album, Mary Star of the Sea (2003), before breaking up acrimoniously that year during their world tour to promote the album.

Following the disbanding, Corgan released a solo album, TheFutureEmbrace, before reforming the Smashing Pumpkins in 2005, with Chamberlin joining in 2006. Despite allusions to multiple albums' worth of material written by band members, no further material has surfaced beyond their only studio album. None of the material had been revisited in performances by any of the members until a 2014 solo show by Corgan; he also played Zwan songs on a brief 2017 tour. In his 2019 solo shows, Corgan played "Honestly" and "Endless Summer" on several dates of his European summer tour.

== History ==
=== Formation and Mary Star of the Sea (2001–2003) ===
Following the breakup of the Smashing Pumpkins, Corgan and drummer Jimmy Chamberlin joined forces with Matt Sweeney (formerly of the bands Chavez and Skunk) to start Zwan. Corgan had been friends with Sweeney since early in his career and Sweeney was thanked in the liner notes to the Smashing Pumpkins album Siamese Dream. Juan Alderete was one of the musicians who auditioned for the bassist position, before Sweeney recruited David Pajo (member of Slint, Papa M, Stereolab and many Drag City acts). The band debuted as a four-piece in late 2001. Later, former A Perfect Circle bassist Paz Lenchantin joined the band in 2002, and Pajo was moved to third guitarist.

Zwan had two different incarnations. The first, and more common version, the True Poets of Zwan (or simply "Zwan"), used three guitars, bass guitar and drums. Zwan's only album, Mary Star of the Sea, is attributed to the True Poets of Zwan in the liner notes. Zwan is credited with being a bridge between the success of the Smashing Pumpkins in the 1990s and the further career developments and experimentations undertaken by Corgan in the 2000s, as well as his shift from his sombre, dark themes towards more hopeful lyrics in line with his spiritual development at the time.

Djali Zwan, an acoustic incarnation of Zwan, which also featured cellist Ana Lenchantin, Paz's sister, was to film and record the making of a new album in the studio in the fall of 2003, with an album and DVD to be issued in early 2004. Corgan spoke with Rolling Stone about his plans: "We're going to do it Let It Be-style," Corgan said, referring to the documentary about the 1970 Beatles album. "The album would be recorded live, with the cameras rolling. When you get the DVD, you can watch the takes on the album being done." He described the songs he'd written for Djali Zwan as "more folk-driven, rooted in traditional music. I don't want to compromise veins of material to fit into an electric band, which I often did in the Pumpkins. With Djali Zwan, I can write an acoustic song and not worry how it's going to stand up against some rock epic."

Billy Corgan, Linda Strawberry, and Matt Sweeney came together to create the soundtrack for the movie Spun (2002), directed by Jonas Åkerlund, and were credited as The Djali Zwan.

=== Break-up (2003) ===
Billy Corgan announced the band had broken up on Chicago's WGN on September 15, 2003. "I really enjoyed my experience with Zwan, but at the end of the day, without that sense of deeper family loyalty, it just becomes like anything else," Corgan said.

In August 2004, Corgan wrote a blog entry in which he finally commented in more detail about the dynamics behind the breakup, calling Pajo, Sweeney, and Lenchantin "dirty, filthy people who have no self-respect or class" whose "main concern is whether or not their indy friends still like them." He was later quoted in the April 24, 2005 edition of the Chicago Tribune: "The music wasn't the big problem, it was more their attitude... Sex acts between band members in public. People carrying drugs across borders. Pajo sleeping with the producer's girlfriend while we were making the record."

In the May 27, 2005, edition of Entertainment Weekly, Corgan elaborated on his version of what went wrong:

Sex and drugs and junk. Tick off the list: heroin, band members having relationships...You don't trust the person next to you. I'm on the bus. I send an email to somebody and I throw my BlackBerry in my little day bag. The next day, my ex-girlfriend calls me screaming. Somebody in the group went into my BlackBerry and forwarded her an e-mail that another girl sends me. I mean, that's the kind of stuff we were dealing with.

Corgan also stated that he can no longer listen to Mary Star of the Sea, because to him it sounds like "thousands of lies upon lies upon lies. It's a shame because there's tons of music unreleased that will just sit in a box until I can stomach it." When asked which of his two former bands would ever reform, he said, "Pumpkins. You'll never see Zwan. I'll never go anywhere near those people. Ever. I mean, I detest them. You can put that in capital letters. Bad people. James and D'arcy are good people. They might be misguided people, but they're good people."

A decade after Zwan's demise, Corgan's stance would soften regarding performance of its material. He included Zwan songs in a set of mostly Smashing Pumpkins material during a solo show in August 2014, and the following year announced a Smashing Pumpkins acoustic tour that would also incorporate Zwan material in its sets. Zwan songs were also featured in Corgan's tour to support his 2017 solo album, Ogilala.

Matt Sweeney, who initiated the band with Corgan, said in 2017, "We had a friendship from before he was famous. One on one, we had a pretty great thing going. We had a great year where we made like a hundred songs. Nobody's ever heard that stuff. But once it went public, everything was different. I was confused, it started to feel like fulfilling a commitment where the game had changed. It was interesting, I'm still sort of unpacking that experience. We all had to sign confidentiality agreements, so I can't really talk about it." David Pajo was also still negative about the band as of 2017.

== Musical style ==
Zwan's debut and only album was described as "an efficient exercise in the kind of American alternative rock with big choruses that makes the boys at the front jump up and down." The band's style is mostly pop-orientated and closer to mainstream pop rock, evoking "the candied pop that characterised much of the Pumpkins' later work." Nevertheless, the songs also contrast with late Pumpkins material, being described as a "bright blast of tuneful guitar rock, as effervescent as the late Pumpkins material was gloomy." In addition to being considered as power pop, the band's work also features guitarist David Pajo's post-rock textures.

== Band members ==
- Jimmy Chamberlin – drums (2001–2003)
- Billy Corgan – guitar, lead vocals (2001–2003)
- David Pajo – bass guitar (2001–2002), guitar (2002–2003)
- Matt Sweeney – guitar, backing vocals (2001–2003)
- Paz Lenchantin – bass guitar, backing vocals (2002–2003)

== Discography ==
=== Studio albums ===
List of studio albums, with selected chart positions
Title	Album details	Peak chart positions									
Title	Album details	US	AUS	CAN	GER	IRL	ITA	NLD	NZ	SWE	UK
Mary Star of the Sea	Released: January 28, 2003 (US); Label: Reprise; Formats: CD, LP, MC, digital download	3	6	4	17	10	14	30	10	17	33

=== Singles ===
List of singles, with selected chart positions, showing year released and album name
Title	Year	Peak chart positions										Album
Title	Year	US Bub.	US Alt.	AUS	CAN	GER	IRL	ITA	NLD	SWE	UK	Album
"Honestly"	2002	3	7	26	17	86	42	18	92	35	28	Mary Star of the Sea
"Lyric"	2003	—	—	—	—	—	—	—	—	—	44	Mary Star of the Sea
"—" denotes a recording that did not chart or was not released in that territory.
