= List of the Smashing Pumpkins band members =

Members of American alternative rock band

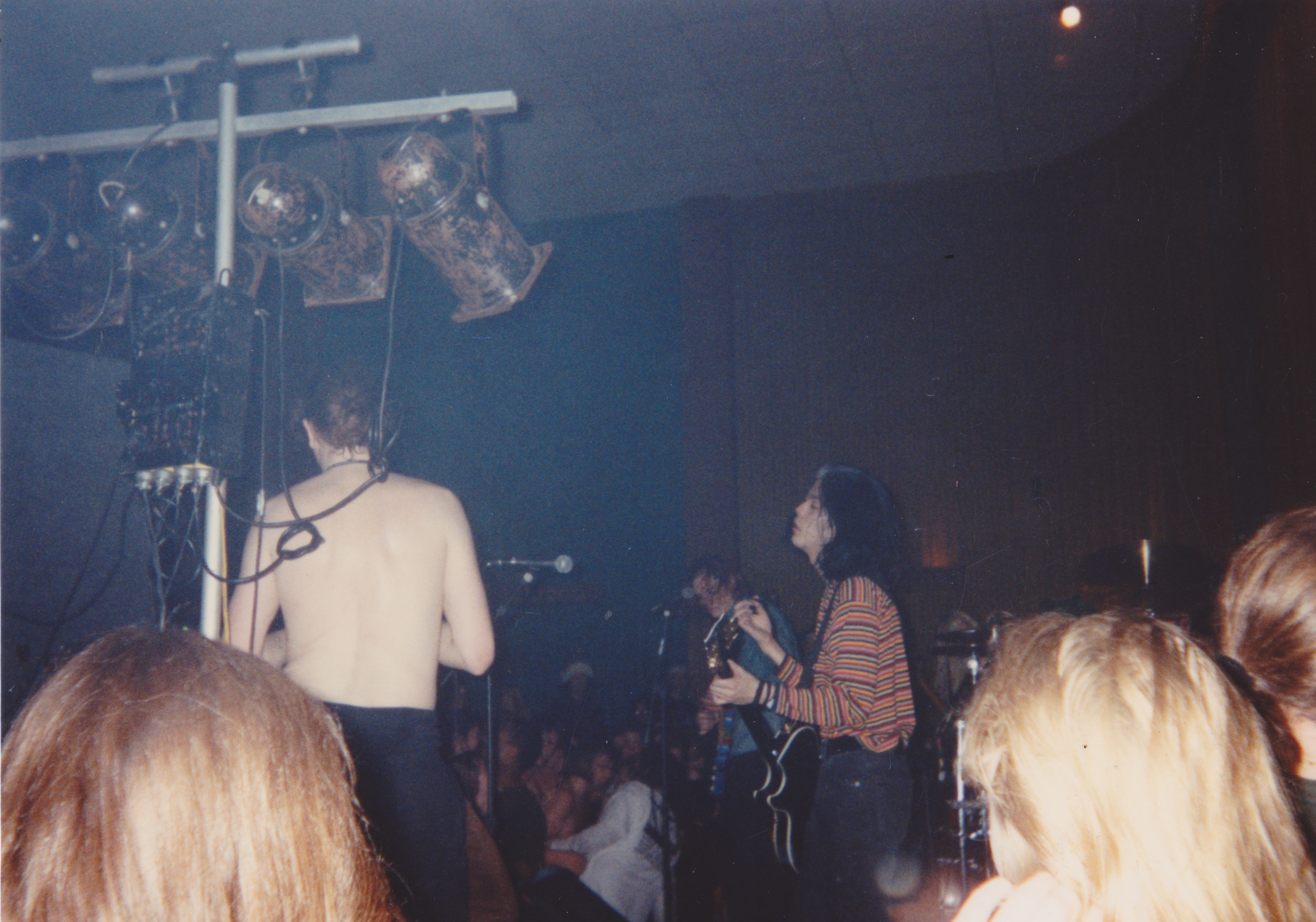
(left to right) Billy Corgan, D'arcy Wretzky, James Iha and Jimmy Chamberlin

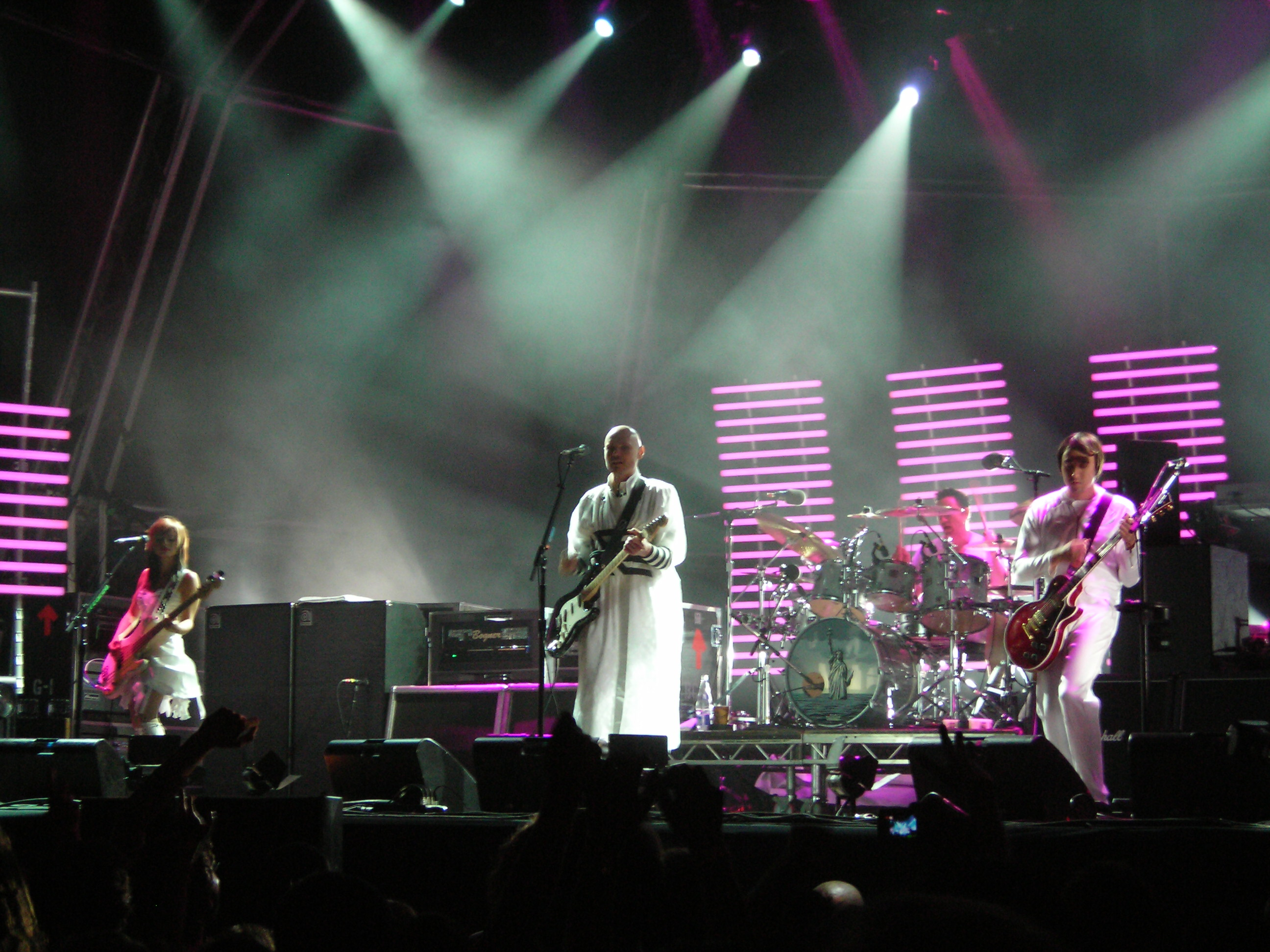
(left to right) Ginger Reyes, Billy Corgan, Jimmy Chamberlin (Back) and Jeff Schroeder (Lisa Harriton not shown)

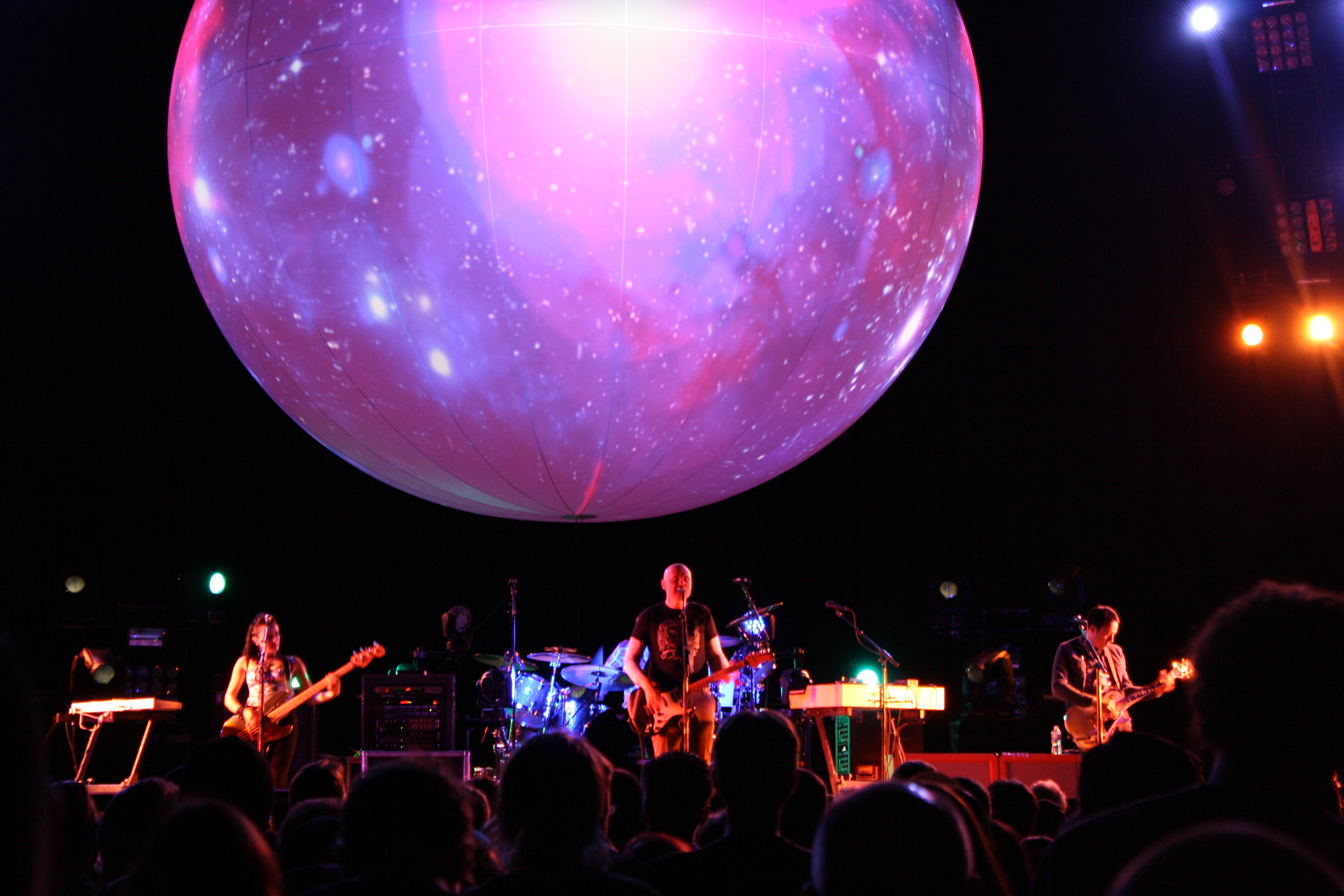
(left to right) Nicole Fiorentino, Billy Corgan, and Jeff Schroeder (Mike Byrne is obscured at the drums)

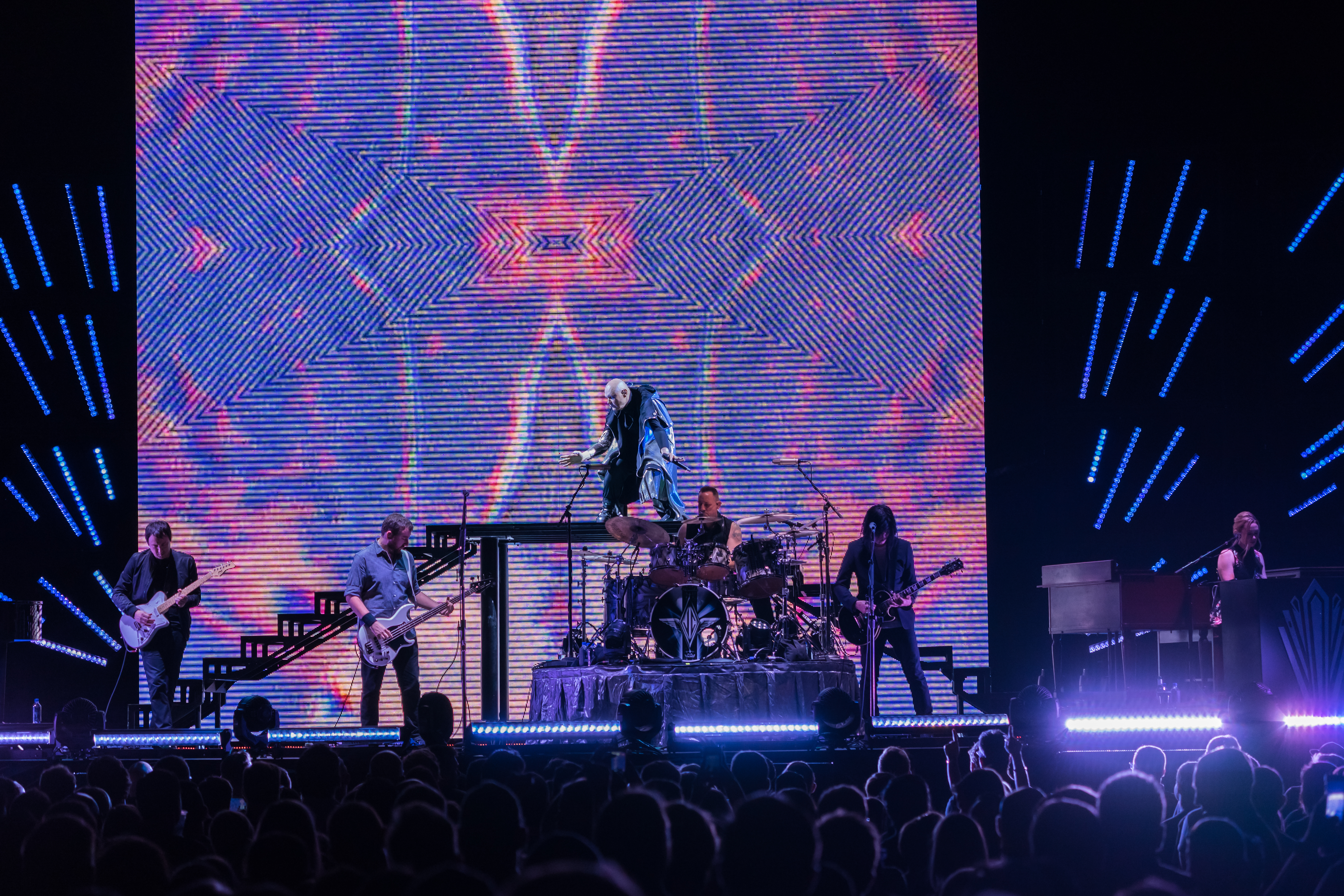
(left to right) Jeff Schroeder, Jack Bates, Billy Corgan, Jimmy Chamberlin, James Iha and Katie Cole

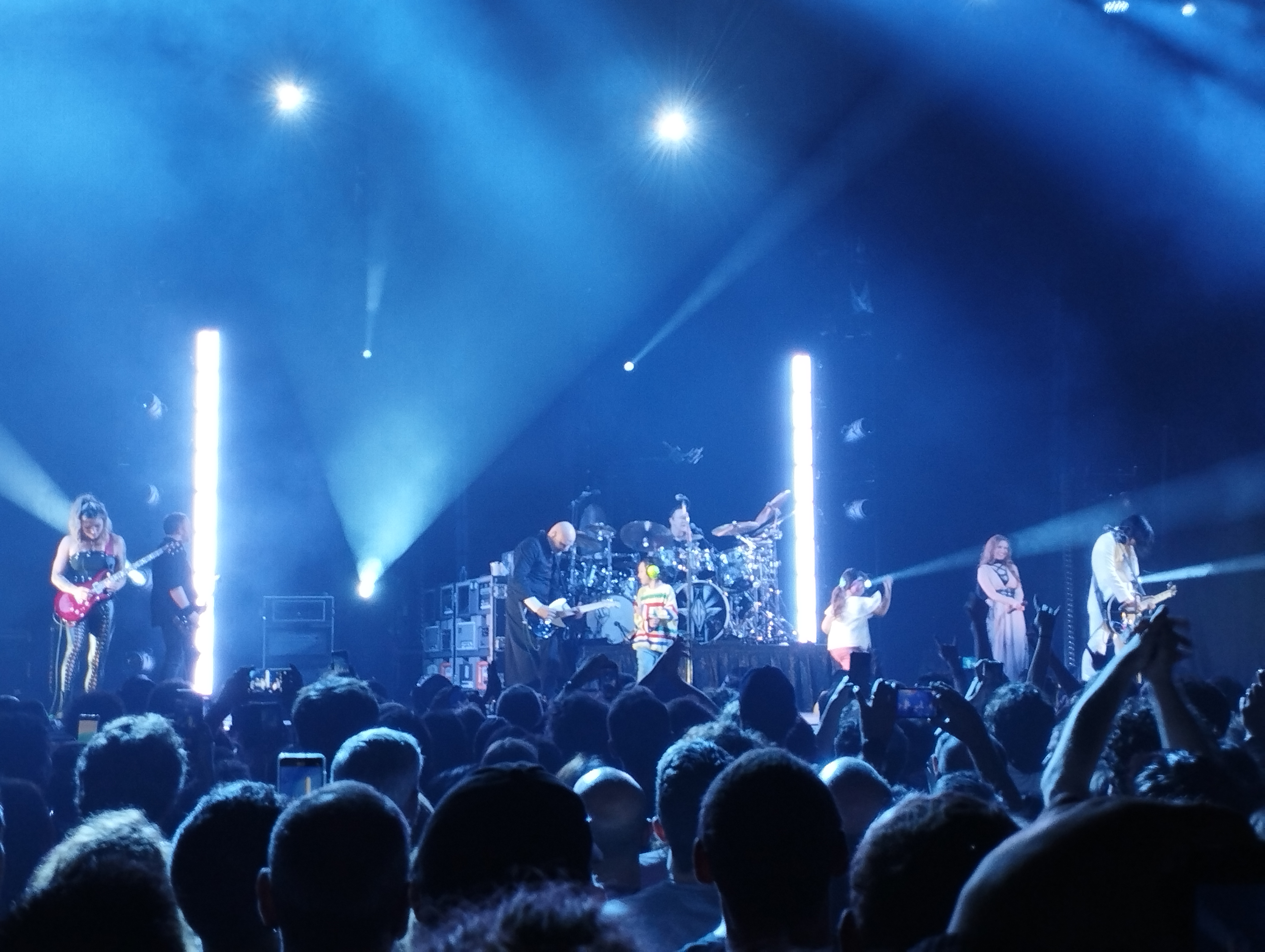
(left to right) Kiki Wong, Jack Bates, Billy Corgan, Jimmy Chamberlin, Katie Cole and James Iha.

Five lineups of the Smashing Pumpkins performing in 1991, 2007, 2012, 2018 and 2024

The Smashing Pumpkins is an alternative rock band formed in Chicago, Illinois, in 1988. The band was formed by guitarist/vocalist Billy Corgan and guitarist James Iha after the demise of Corgan's first band, the Marked. The two musicians were soon joined by bassist D'arcy Wretzky and drummer Jimmy Chamberlin. Since its inception, the Smashing Pumpkins has gone through several line-up changes, with Corgan the only consistent member.

Their current formation includes Corgan alongside Iha (who rejoined in 2018) and Chamberlin, who has had four tenures. The band also tours with bassist Jack Bates (who first joined in 2015), and guitarist Kiki Wong (since 2024).

== History ==
After the breakup of his gothic rock band the Marked, singer and guitarist Billy Corgan left St. Petersburg, Florida, to return to his native city of Chicago, where he took a job in a record store. While working there, he met guitarist James Iha. The pair soon began writing songs together with the aid of a drum machine. Corgan met bassist D'arcy Wretzky in mid 1988 after a show by the Dan Reed Network where they argued the merits of the band. After finding out Wretzky played bass, Corgan stated his band's need for a bassist and gave Wretzky his telephone number. Wretzky soon joined the band, and she and Iha later had a short-lived romance.

The first performance of the Smashing Pumpkins was on July 9, 1988, at the Polish bar Chicago 21. This performance included only Corgan and Iha with a drum machine. On August 10, 1988, the band played for the first time as a trio at the Avalon Nightclub. After this show, Cabaret Metro owner Joe Shanahan agreed to book the band on the condition that they replace the drum machine with a live drummer. Jazz drummer Jimmy Chamberlin was recruited for the band after a recommendation from a friend of Corgan's. On October 5, 1988, the complete band took the stage for the first time at the Cabaret Metro.

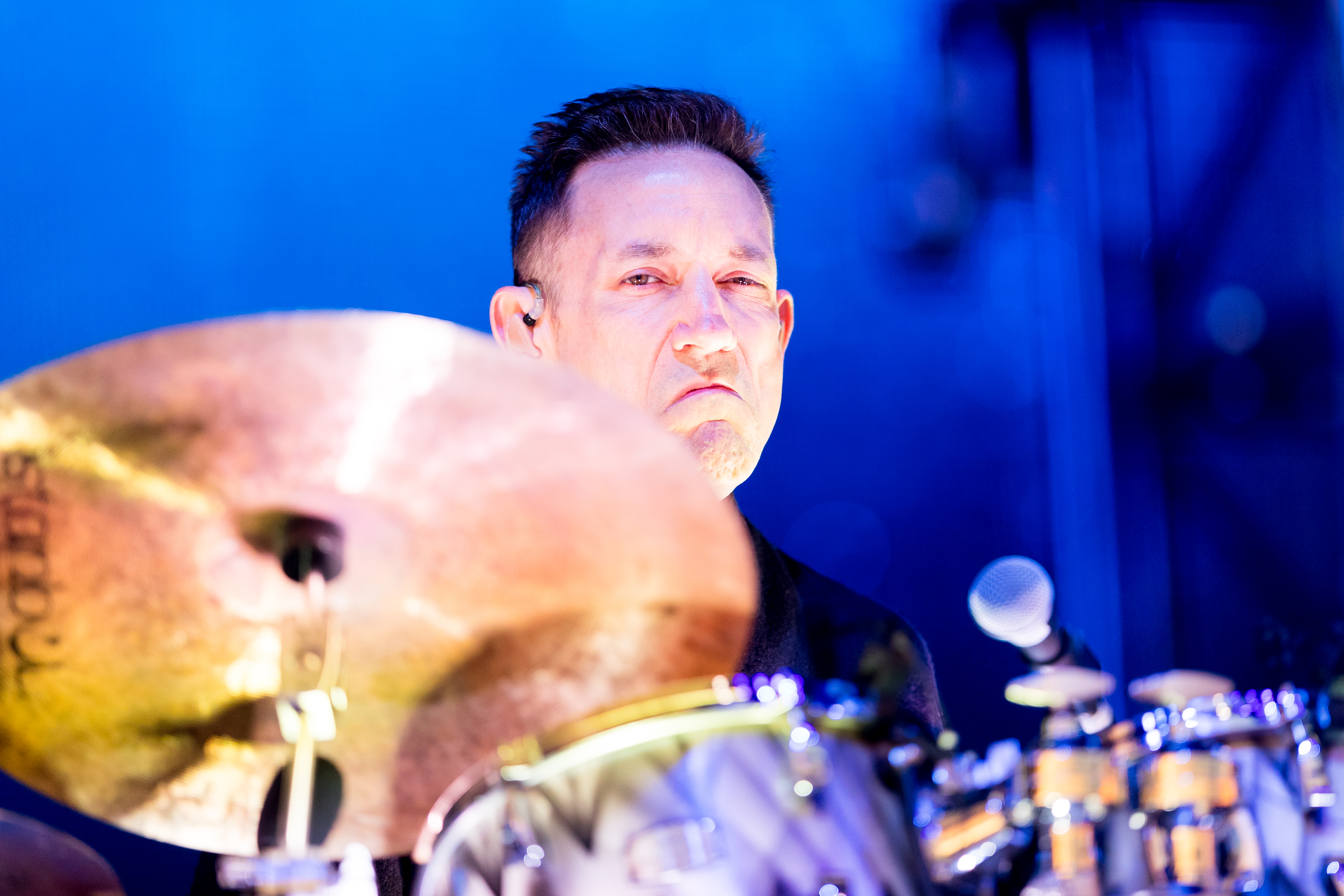
Original drummer Jimmy Chamberlin was fired in 1996 and has been in and out of the band several times since.

Soon after the release of their third album, Mellon Collie and the Infinite Sadness in 1995, the group recruited keyboardist Jonathan Melvoin to perform on the ensuing tour. However, on July 11, 1996, Melvoin and Chamberlin overdosed on heroin in a New York City hotel room. Melvoin died, and Chamberlin was arrested for drug possession. A few days later, the band announced that Chamberlin had been fired as a result of the incident. The Pumpkins chose to finish the tour, and hired drummer Matt Walker and keyboardist Dennis Flemion as temporary replacements. Corgan later said the decision to continue touring was the worst the band had ever made, damaging both their music and their reputation.

In early 1999, Jimmy Chamberlin rejoined the band; however, the reunion was short-lived, as bassist D'arcy Wretzky announced her departure that September. She was subsequently replaced by former Hole bassist Melissa Auf der Maur, who performed on the “Sacred and Profane" tour and appeared in music videos. On May 23, 2000, in a live radio interview on KROQ-FM (Los Angeles), Billy Corgan announced the band's decision to break up at the end of that year following additional touring and recording. The Smashing Pumpkins played at the Cabaret Metro on December 2, 2000, before a six-year disbandment.

On July 21, 2005, Corgan stated in full-page advertisements in the Chicago Tribune and Chicago Sun-Times that he planned to reunite the band. On April 20, 2006, the band's official website confirmed the reunion. Corgan and Chamberlin were verified as participants in the reunion, but it was unclear whether other former members of the band would participate. In April 2007, Iha and Auf der Maur separately confirmed that they were not taking part in the reunion. Wretzky did not make an announcement, but Chamberlin would later state that Iha and Wretzky "didn't want to be a part of" the reunion. The Smashing Pumpkins performed live for the first time since 2000 on May 22, 2007, in Paris, France, with new members Jeff Schroeder on guitar and Ginger Reyes on bass guitar, as well as keyboardist Lisa Harriton.

This line-up toured to promote the 2007 album Zeitgeist and performed again throughout 2008 to celebrate the band's 20th anniversary—this time, the instrumentation was augmented by No Doubt trumpeter Stephen Bradley and trombonist Gabrial McNair, Kristopher Pooley on accordion and keyboards, and Gingger Shankar playing the rare 10-string violin. In March 2009, Corgan announced on the band's website that longtime drummer Jimmy Chamberlin had left the group; Chamberlin stated that the split was amicable, commenting that he was "glad [Corgan] has chosen to continue under the name. It is his right." Corgan later stated that he fired Chamberlin and began searching for his replacement.

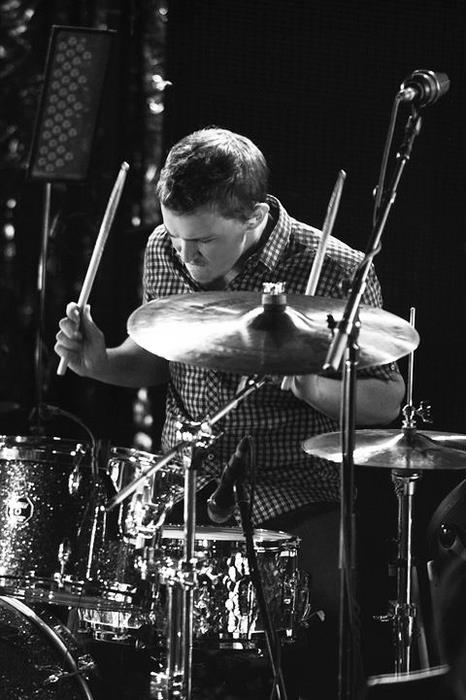
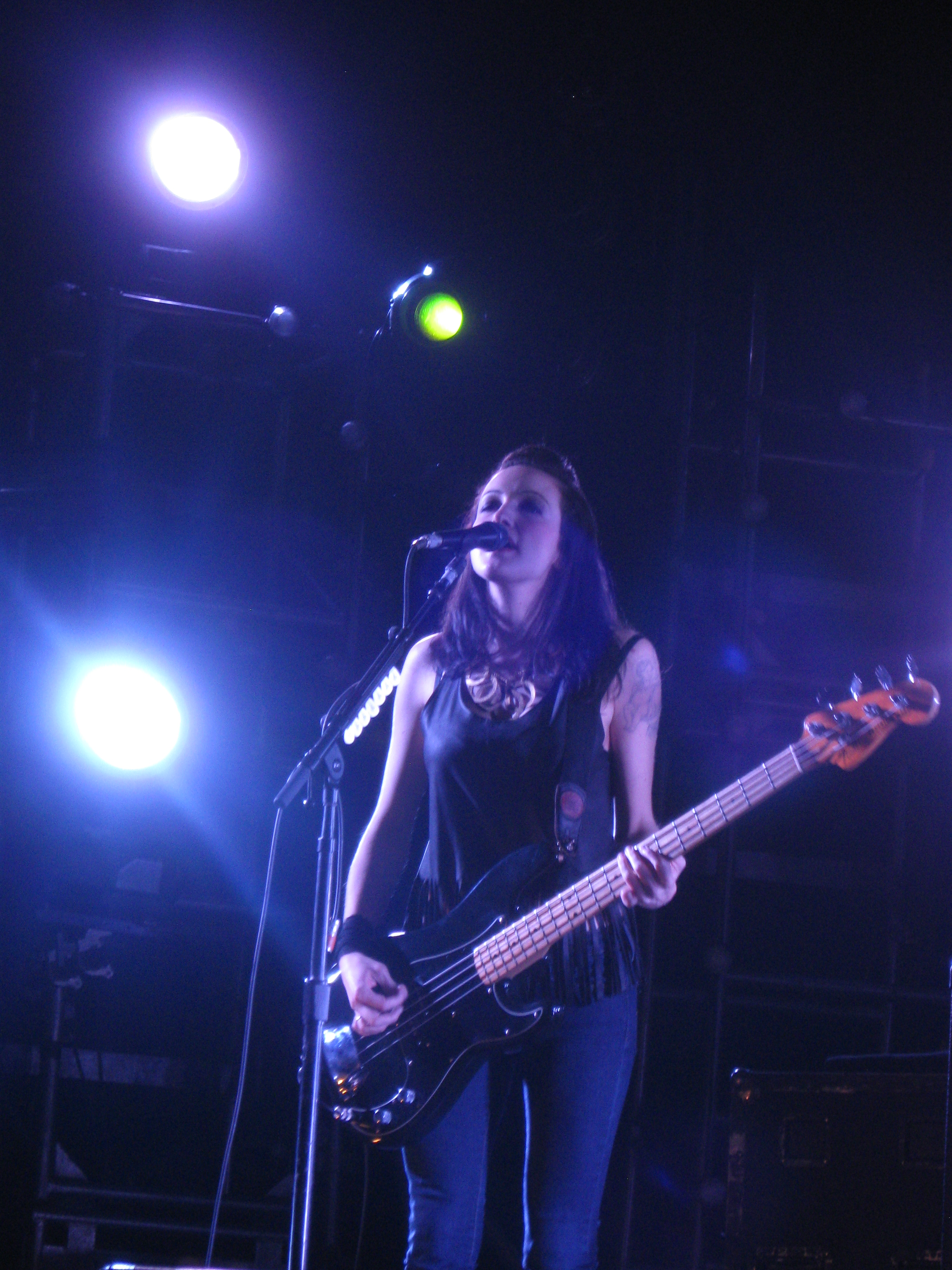
Drummer Mike Byrne and bassist Nicole Fiorentino joined the band in 2009 and 2010, respectively.

In August 2009, Corgan confirmed on the band's website that drummer Mike Byrne had replaced Chamberlin after a series of open auditions. Keyboardist Lisa Harriton quietly left the group in 2009. In March 2010, bassist Ginger Reyes (now Ginger Pooley) officially left the band in order to focus on her family and was briefly replaced by Mark Tulin of the Electric Prunes. In May 2010, Nicole Fiorentino was announced as the official replacement for Pooley. However, she was later dismissed from the band in 2014, alongside Byrne.

Mötley Crüe's Tommy Lee played on Monuments to an Elegy and Brad Wilk toured with the band, alongside bassist Mark Stoermer for tour dates in late 2014 and early 2015. In 2015, the band were to be joined by drummer Robin Diaz and bassist Katie Cole; however, Diaz was replaced by original drummer Chamberlin on a touring basis. Cole was also replaced by Jack Bates during the tour. Cole returned in 2016, this time on keyboards and guitar, while Sierra Swan joined on bass, keyboards and other instruments.

In February 2018, Iha and Chamberlin officially rejoined for the Shiny And Oh So Bright Tour with touring members Cole and Bates. On October 24, 2023, it was announced on the band's social media that Jeff Schroeder had decided to leave the band "to explore a slightly different path". In April 2024, the band revealed Kiki Wong as new touring guitarist.

== Band members ==
=== Current members ===
Image	Name	Years active	Instruments	Release contributions
	Billy Corgan	1988–2000; 2006–present	lead vocals; guitars; bass; keyboards	all of The Smashing Pumpkins' releases.
	James Iha	1988–2000; 2016 (guest); 2018–present	guitars; bass; backing and occasional lead vocals	all releases from Gish (1991) to Machina II/The Friends & Enemies of Modern Music (2000); all releases from Shiny and Oh So Bright, Vol. 1 / LP: No Past. No Future. No Sun. (2018) onward
	Jimmy Chamberlin	1988–1996; 1999–2000; 2006–2009; 2015–2017 (touring only); 2018–present	drums; percussion	all releases from Gish (1991) to Mellon Collie and the Infinite Sadness (1995); Machina/The Machines of God (2000); Machina II/The Friends & Enemies of Modern Music (2000); Zeitgeist (2007); American Gothic (2008); all releases from Shiny and Oh So Bright, Vol. 1 / LP: No Past. No Future. No Sun. (2018) onward

=== Current touring members ===
Image	Name	Years active	Instruments	Release contributions
	Jack Bates	2015; 2018–present	bass	none
	Kiki Wong	2024–present	guitar	none

=== Former members ===
Image	Name	Years active	Instruments	Release contributions
	D'arcy Wretzky	1988–1999	bass; backing and occasional lead vocals	all releases from Gish (1991) to Machina II/The Friends & Enemies of Modern Music (2000)
	Melissa Auf der Maur	1999–2000; 2026 (guest)	bass; backing vocals	none
	Jeff Schroeder	2006–2010 (touring only); 2010–2023	guitars; backing vocals; keyboards	all releases from American Gothic (2008) to Atum: A Rock Opera in Three Acts (2022–2023)
	Mike Byrne	2009–2014	drums; percussion; backing vocals; keyboards	Teargarden by Kaleidyscope (2009–2014)
	Nicole Fiorentino	2010–2014	bass; keyboards; backing vocals	Teargarden by Kaleidyscope (2009–2014)

=== Former touring members ===
Image	Name	Years active	Instruments	Release contributions
	Eric Remschneider	1993–1994	cello	Siamese Dream (1993)
	Jonathan Melvoin	1995–1996 (his death)	keyboards; backing vocals	none
	Dennis Flemion	1996–1997 (died 2012)	keyboards; backing vocals	Adore (1998)
	Matt Walker	1996–1997	drums; percussion	Adore (1998)
	Mike Garson	1998; 2000	piano; keyboards	Machina/The Machines of God (2000); Machina II/The Friends & Enemies of Modern Music (2000)
	Kenny Aronoff	1998	drums; percussion	none
	Stephen Hodges	1998	percussion	none
	Dan Morris	1998 (died 2007)	percussion	none
	Chris Holmes	2000	keyboards; vocoder	none
	Ginger Reyes	2007–2010	bass; backing vocals	American Gothic (2008)
	Lisa Harriton	2007–2010	keyboards; backing vocals	American Gothic (2008)
	Stephen Bradley	2008	trumpet; backing vocals	none
	Gabrial McNair	2008	trombone; backing vocals	none
	Kristopher Pooley	2008	accordion; keyboards; backing vocals	none
	Gingger Shankar	2008	10-string violin	none
	Mark Tulin	2010 (died 2011)	bass	Teargarden by Kaleidyscope (2009–2014)
	Mark Stoermer	2014–2015	bass	none
	Brad Wilk	2014–2015	drums	none
	Katie Cole	2015; 2016–2024	keyboards; guitar; bass; backing vocals; various other instruments	Cyr (2020); Atum: A Rock Opera in Three Acts (2022–2023); Aghori Mhori Mei (2024)
	Sierra Swan	2016–2017	bass; keyboards; backing vocals; various other instruments	Cyr (2020); Atum: A Rock Opera in Three Acts (2022–2023)

=== Studio and guest musicians ===
Image	Name	Years active	Instruments	Release contributions
	Mary Gaines	1990–1991	cello on "Daydream"	Gish (1991)
	Chris Wagner	1990–1991	violin and viola on "Daydream"	Gish (1991)
	Mike Mills	1992–1993	piano on "Soma"	Siamese Dream (1993)
	David Ragsdale	1992–1993	string arrangements and violin on "Disarm" and "Luna"	Siamese Dream (1993)
	Kerry Brown	1994; 2009–2010	drums; congas	Teargarden by Kaleidyscope (2009–2014)
	Chicago Symphony Orchestra	1995	orchestra in "Tonight, Tonight"	Mellon Collie and the Infinite Sadness (1995)
	Greg Leisz	1995	pedal and lap steel guitar on "Take Me Down"'	Mellon Collie and the Infinite Sadness (1995)
	Jimmy Flemion	1996; 1997–1998	instruments; additional vocals	Adore (1998)
	Matt Cameron	1997–1998	drums on "For Martha"	Adore (1998)
	Joey Waronker	1997–1998	drums on "Perfect"; additional drums on "Once Upon a Time" and "Pug"	Adore (1998)
	Bon Harris	1997–1998	additional programming on tracks 2–5, 7–9 and 13; additional vocals in "For Martha"	Adore (1998)
	Brad Wood	1997–1998	additional vocals in "Behold! The Night Mare"; organ in "Blank Page"	Adore (1998)
	Bjorn Thorsrud	1998–1999 (died 2021)	programming	Machina/The Machines of God (2000)
	Ysanne Spevack	2010	violin; viola	Teargarden by Kaleidyscope (2009–2014)
	Linda Strawberry	2010	backing vocals	Teargarden by Kaleidyscope (2009–2014)
	Kevin Dippold	2011	backing vocals	Teargarden by Kaleidyscope (2009–2014)
	Tommy Lee	2014	drums; percussion	Teargarden by Kaleidyscope (2009–2014)
	Sstaria (Sheri Shaw)	2014	backing vocals on "Anaise!"	Teargarden by Kaleidyscope (2009–2014)
	Daphne Chen – violin	2018	strings on "Knights of Malta" and "Alienation"	Shiny and Oh So Bright, Vol. 1 / LP: No Past. No Future. No Sun. (2018)
	Eric Forman – violin	2018	strings on "Knights of Malta" and "Alienation"	Shiny and Oh So Bright, Vol. 1 / LP: No Past. No Future. No Sun. (2018)
	Richard Dodd – cello	2018	strings on "Knights of Malta" and "Alienation"	Shiny and Oh So Bright, Vol. 1 / LP: No Past. No Future. No Sun. (2018)
	Leah Katz – viola	2018	strings on "Knights of Malta" and "Alienation"	Shiny and Oh So Bright, Vol. 1 / LP: No Past. No Future. No Sun. (2018)
	Charissa Nielsen	2018	additional background vocals on "Knights of Malta"	Shiny and Oh So Bright, Vol. 1 / LP: No Past. No Future. No Sun. (2018)
	Briana Lee	2018	additional background vocals on "Knights of Malta"	Shiny and Oh So Bright, Vol. 1 / LP: No Past. No Future. No Sun. (2018)
	Missi Hale	2018	additional background vocals on "Knights of Malta"	Shiny and Oh So Bright, Vol. 1 / LP: No Past. No Future. No Sun. (2018)

== Line-ups ==
The Smashing Pumpkins line-ups
Period	Members	Releases
early 1988	Billy Corgan – lead vocals, guitar, bass, keyboards; James Iha – guitar, bass, backing vocals	none – one live performance each
mid 1988	Billy Corgan – lead vocals, guitar, keyboards; James Iha – guitar, backing vocals; D'arcy Wretzky – bass, backing vocals	none – one live performance each
October 1988 – June 1992	Billy Corgan – lead vocals, guitar, keyboards; James Iha – guitar, backing vocals; D'arcy Wretzky – bass, backing vocals; Jimmy Chamberlin – drums, percussion	Gish (1991); Lull (1991); Peel Sessions (1992)
July 1992 – early 1995	Billy Corgan – lead vocals, guitar, keyboards; James Iha – guitar, backing vocals; D'arcy Wretzky – bass, backing vocals; Jimmy Chamberlin – drums, percussion; Eric Remschneider – cello (touring/session)	Siamese Dream (1993)
early 1995 – July 1996	Billy Corgan – lead vocals, guitar, keyboards; James Iha – guitar, backing vocals; D'arcy Wretzky – bass, backing vocals; Jimmy Chamberlin – drums, percussion; Jonathan Melvoin – keyboards, backing vocals (touring)	Mellon Collie and the Infinite Sadness (1995)
July 1996 – March 1998	Billy Corgan – lead vocals, guitar, keyboards; James Iha – guitar, backing vocals; D'arcy Wretzky – bass, backing vocals; Matt Walker – drums, percussion (touring/session); Dennis Flemion – keyboards, backing vocals (touring/session)	Adore (1998)
April – September 1998	Billy Corgan – lead vocals, guitar, keyboards; James Iha – guitar, backing vocals; D'arcy Wretzky – bass, backing vocals; Kenny Aronoff – drums, percussion (touring); Mike Garson – piano, keyboards (touring); Dan Morris – percussion (touring); Stephen Hodges – percussion (touring)	none – live performances only
October 1998 – early 1999	Billy Corgan – lead vocals, guitar, keyboards; James Iha – guitar, backing vocals; D'arcy Wretzky – bass, backing vocals; Kenny Aronoff – drums, percussion (touring); Mike Garson – piano, keyboards (touring)	none – live performances only
early – September 1999	Billy Corgan – lead vocals, guitar, keyboards; James Iha – guitar, backing vocals; D'arcy Wretzky – bass, backing vocals; Mike Garson – piano, keyboards (touring/session); Jimmy Chamberlin – drums, percussion	Machina/The Machines of God (2000)
September – December 1999	Billy Corgan – lead vocals, guitar, bass, keyboards; James Iha – guitar, bass, backing vocals; Mike Garson – piano, keyboards (touring/session); Jimmy Chamberlin – drums, percussion	Machina II/The Friends & Enemies of Modern Music (2000)
December 1999 – December 2000	Billy Corgan – lead vocals, guitar, keyboards; James Iha – guitar, backing vocals; Mike Garson – piano, keyboards (touring); Jimmy Chamberlin – drums, percussion; Melissa Auf der Maur – bass, backing vocals	none – live performances only
2000–2006	Band inactive	
April 2006 – April 2007	Billy Corgan – lead vocals, guitar, bass, keyboards; Jimmy Chamberlin – drums, percussion	Zeitgeist (2007)
April 2007 – October 2008	Billy Corgan – lead vocals, guitar, bass, keyboards; Jimmy Chamberlin – drums, percussion; Jeff Schroeder – guitar, backing vocals, keyboards; Ginger Reyes – bass, backing vocals (touring); Lisa Harriton – keyboards, backing vocals (touring)	American Gothic (2008)
October – December 2008	Billy Corgan – lead vocals, guitar, bass, keyboards; Jimmy Chamberlin – drums, percussion; Jeff Schroeder – guitar, backing vocals, keyboards; Ginger Reyes – bass, backing vocals (touring); Lisa Harriton – keyboards, backing vocals (touring); Kristopher Pooley – accordion, keyboards, backing vocals (touring); Stephen Bradley – trumpet, backing vocals (touring); Gabriel McNair – trombone, backing vocals (touring); Gingger Shankar – 10-string violin (touring)	none – live performances only
December 2008 – March 2009	Billy Corgan – lead vocals, guitar, bass, keyboards; Jimmy Chamberlin – drums, percussion; Jeff Schroeder – guitar, backing vocals, keyboards; Ginger Reyes – bass, backing vocals (touring); Lisa Harriton – keyboards, backing vocals (touring)	none – rehearsals only
August 2009 – March 2010	Billy Corgan – lead vocals, guitar, bass, keyboards; Jeff Schroeder – guitar, backing vocals, keyboards; Ginger Reyes – bass, backing vocals (touring); Lisa Harriton – keyboards, backing vocals (touring); Mike Byrne – drums, backing vocals	none – rehearsals only
April 2010	Billy Corgan – lead vocals, guitar, bass, keyboards; Jeff Schroeder – guitar, backing vocals, keyboards; Mark Tulin – bass (touring); Mike Byrne – drums, percussion, backing vocals	none – live performances only
May 2010 – mid 2014	Billy Corgan – lead vocals, guitar, bass, keyboards; Jeff Schroeder – guitar, backing vocals, keyboards; Mike Byrne – drums, percussion, backing vocals, keyboards; Nicole Fiorentino – bass, keyboards, backing vocals	Oceania (2012)
March – July 2014	Billy Corgan – lead vocals, guitar, bass, keyboards; Jeff Schroeder – guitar, backing vocals, keyboards; Tommy Lee – drums, percussion (session)	Monuments to an Elegy (2014)
November 2014 – April 2015	Billy Corgan – lead vocals, guitar, bass, keyboards; Jeff Schroeder – guitar, backing vocals, keyboards; Mark Stoermer – bass (touring); Brad Wilk – drums, percussion (touring)	none – live performances only
June 2015	Billy Corgan – lead vocals, guitar, bass, keyboards; Jeff Schroeder – guitar, backing vocals, keyboards; Jimmy Chamberlin – drums, percussion (touring); Katie Cole – bass, keyboards, guitar backing vocals (touring)	none – live performances only
July – August 2015	Billy Corgan – lead vocals, guitar, bass, keyboards; Jeff Schroeder – guitar, backing vocals, keyboards; Jimmy Chamberlin – drums, percussion (touring); Jack Bates – bass (touring)	none – live performances only
March – May 2016	Billy Corgan – lead vocals, guitar, bass, keyboards; Jeff Schroeder – guitar, backing vocals, keyboards; Jimmy Chamberlin – drums, percussion (touring); Katie Cole – keyboards, guitar, bass, backing vocals (touring); Sierra Swan – bass, keyboards, backing vocals (touring)	none – live performances only
March 2018 – October 2023	Billy Corgan – lead vocals, guitar, bass, keyboards; Jeff Schroeder – guitar, backing vocals, keyboards; Jimmy Chamberlin – drums, percussion; Katie Cole – keyboards, guitar, backing vocals (touring/session); James Iha – guitar, bass, backing vocals; Jack Bates – bass (touring)	Shiny and Oh So Bright, Vol. 1 / LP: No Past. No Future. No Sun. (2018); Cyr (2020); Atum: A Rock Opera in Three Acts (2022–2023)
April – October 2024	Billy Corgan – lead vocals, guitar, bass, keyboards; James Iha – guitar, bass, backing vocals; Jimmy Chamberlin – drums, percussion; Katie Cole – keyboards, guitar, backing vocals (touring/session); Jack Bates – bass (touring); Kiki Wong – guitar (touring)	Aghori Mhori Mei (2024)
October 2024 – present	Billy Corgan – lead vocals, guitar, bass, keyboards; James Iha – guitar, bass, backing vocals; Jimmy Chamberlin – drums, percussion; Jack Bates – bass (touring); Kiki Wong – guitar (touring)	none – live performances only
