= American Gothic (EP) =

EP by the Smashing Pumpkins
- Released: January 1, 2008
- Recorded: December 2007
- Genre: Alternative rock
- Length: 17:01
- Label: Reprise
- Producer: Jimmy Chamberlin; Billy Corgan; Roy Thomas Baker

The Smashing Pumpkins chronology
Zeitgeist (2007)	American Gothic (2008)	Teargarden by Kaleidyscope (2009)

American Gothic is the fourth EP by the Smashing Pumpkins. The EP was announced on the band's website on December 19, 2007 with songwriter Billy Corgan describing it as a continuation of their 2007 album Zeitgeist. It was released digitally on January 2, 2008 and as a CD in the United Kingdom on February 11, 2008.

== Background ==
After playing "Again Again Again" in Los Angeles in late 2006 at an event organized by Pete Townshend's girlfriend, Corgan was asked by Townshend himself if the song was going to be on Zeitgeist. While the song did not make the album, Corgan always planned to release it in some form, resulting in its appearance on American Gothic.

Corgan said of the EP,

I had written a bunch of material during the residencies in Asheville and San Francisco [earlier this year], and fans kept asking us if we were gonna put any of that stuff out. iTunes came to us wanting to do something together, so it just felt right.

Corgan also made high-resolution artwork for the EP available for download through the band's website.

In an interview with the Los Angeles Times, Billy Corgan stated that, with American Gothic and the new single "G.L.O.W.", the band "finally turned the corner... where it's starting to feel like our music again, and not theirs, whoever 'they' might be," referring to the band's choice to continue making music without a record label.

== Music ==
The EP contains four acoustic tracks that feature folk strumming. Their sound has been described as "an extension of the straight-ahead alternative rock sound that the Smashing Pumpkins returned to on the band's 2007 comeback outing, Zeitgeist." The EP also features a more polished production work in contrast to the band's previous acoustic music input, which mostly consisted of demos.

The track "The Rose March" features an electric rhythm guitar and guitar picking reminiscent of the Smashing Pumpkins' early work, as well as overdubbed harmonies. The track "Again, Again, Again (The Crux)", which was described to be catchiest on the EP, features drum fills played by the Smashing Pumpkins Jimmy Chamberlin. The "jangly" track "Pox" was described as "the pick of the bunch, grungy acoustic and bass fairly thrumming with latent menace," while the track "Sunkissed" is an atmospheric song that "recaptures some of the group's '90s verve."

== Release ==
The EP includes four unreleased tracks recorded in the late 2007 break between tours at the Pass Studio in Los Angeles. In the United States, the EP was released as an exclusive digital release for the iTunes Store on January 1, 2008 as part of a re-release of Zeitgeist, but it received a physical release internationally on February 11 and March 4 in Canada.

7digital also released a download-only "UK Tour Edition" on February 25 that features four bonus tracks, all recorded during the February 2008 UK tour.

== Critical reception ==
Professional ratings
Review scores
Source	Rating
Consequence of Sound	C−
Drowned in Sound	4/10

Consequence of Sound critic Michael Roffman wrote: "If anything, Gothic is a step forward from Zeitgeist, in that there are hints, both lyrically and musically, of that despair and angst that made ballads “Tonight, Tonight” and “Crush” so successful." Nevertheless, Roffman also criticized Corgan's creative dominance over the release, stating: "If Corgan wants us to buy into his new motley crew of Pumpkins, he is going to have to be more of a collaborator and less of a dictator." Alex Denney of Drowned in Sound wrote: "It's passably structured, yes, but instantly forgettable and with a curious lack of personality that’s unfortunately become one of Corgan’s calling cards post-Y2K." Joachim Hackshaw of Television New Zealand praised the EP and stated: "The EP is full of shifts in momentum and the drums really drive the mood on this brief musical journey." Hackshaw eventually concluded: "I can't really say enough about this EP apart from to give it my full recommendation, I just wish it was longer." Allmusic commented: "Though it probably won't result in many new converts, the EP proves that the well-received Zeitgeist wasn't just a Corgan-fueled fluke."

== Track listing ==
All songs written by Billy Corgan:

1. "The Rose March" – 4:32
2. "Again, Again, Again (The Crux)" – 3:44
3. "Pox" – 3:38
4. "Sunkissed" – 5:10

UK tour edition bonus tracks

5. "Lily (My One and Only)" (Live, February 2008) – 3:27
6. "That's the Way (My Love Is)" (Live, February 2008) – 4:17
7. "1979" (Live, February 2008) – 4:34
8. "Perfect" (Live, February 2008) – 4:15

== Personnel ==
The Smashing Pumpkins

- Jimmy Chamberlin – drums, production, mixing
- Billy Corgan – lead vocals, guitar, keyboards, production, mixing, art direction, photography

Additional musicians

- Lisa Harriton – keyboards, backing vocals on "Lily" and "That's the Way"
- Ginger Reyes – bass guitar, backing vocals on "Lily"
- Jeff Schroeder – guitar, backing vocals on "Lily"

Production

- Roy Thomas Baker – production and mixing on "Again, Again, Again"
- Stephen Marcussen – mastering
- Zephrus Sowers – assistant engineer
- Matt Taylor – art direction, design
- Bjorn Thorsrud – recording, mixing

== Charts ==
Chart performance for American Gothic
Chart (2008)	Peak position
Australia (ARIA)	82
