= Jeff Schroeder =

American musician (born 1974)

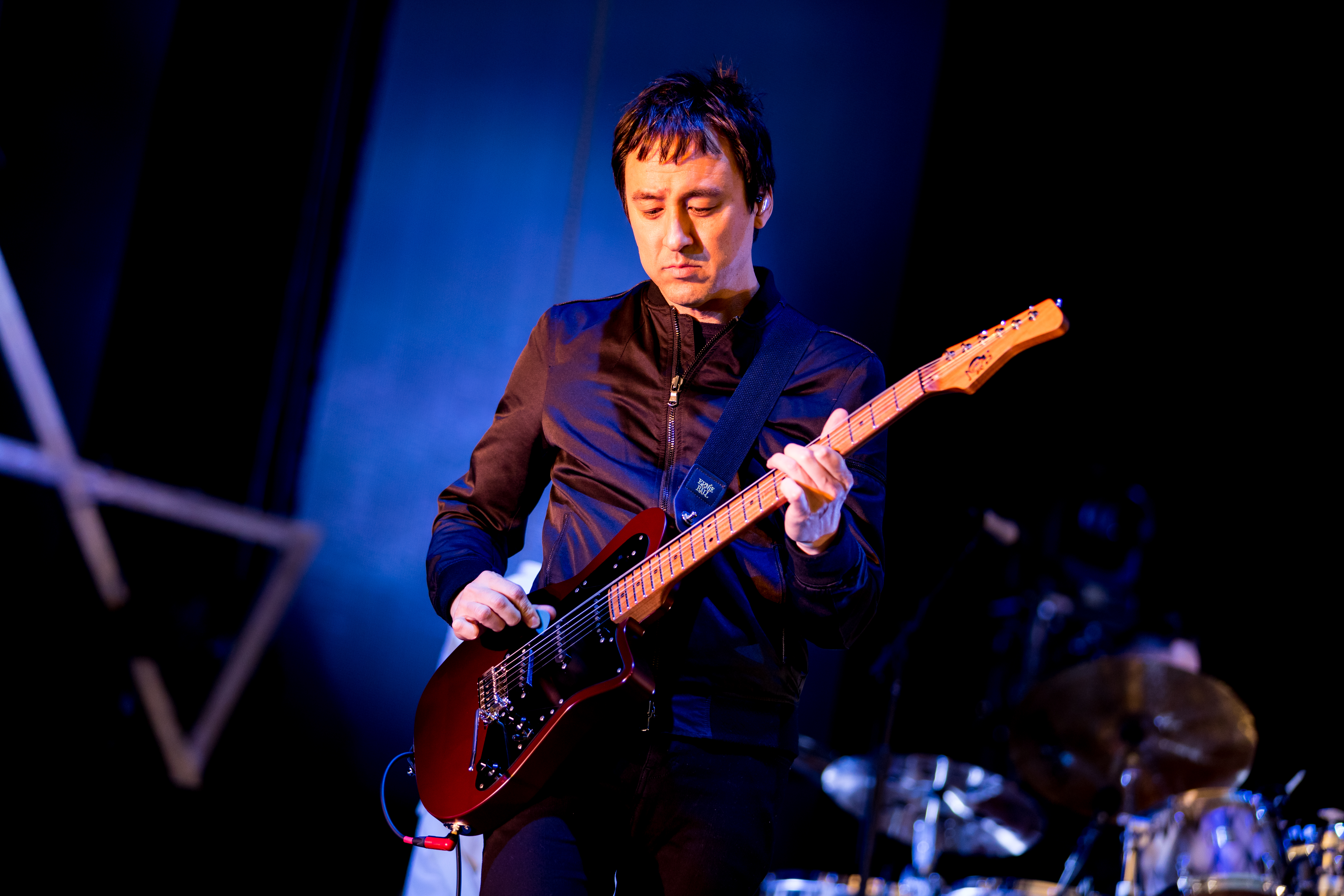
- Schroeder performing with the Smashing Pumpkins in 2019

Background information
- Born: Jeffrey Kim Schroeder; February 4, 1974 (age 52); Los Angeles, California, United States
- Genres: Alternative rock; alternative metal; shoegaze; indie pop; dream pop
- Occupations: Musician, songwriter
- Instruments: Guitar; keyboards
- Years active: 1996–present
- Formerly of: The Violet Burning; The Lassie Foundation; The Smashing Pumpkins

Jeffrey Kim Schroeder (born February 4, 1974) is an American musician. He is best known as a former guitarist in the alternative rock band the Smashing Pumpkins, performing with them from 2007 to 2023. He recorded five studio albums with the band, from 2012's Oceania to 2022's Atum. After bandleader Billy Corgan, drummer Jimmy Chamberlin, and Schroeder's predecessor and later bandmate James Iha, Schroeder is the fourth-longest-serving member of the group.

Initially replacing co-founder James Iha, Schroeder made his live debut with the Smashing Pumpkins on May 22, 2007, in Paris, France, as the band embarked on an extensive comeback tour in support of the album Zeitgeist. After the tour's completion, Schroeder became a core member of the band and was described by Corgan as a key collaborator on the subsequent albums Oceania (2012) and Monuments to an Elegy (2014). Following Iha's return in 2018, Schroeder remained in the band, ushering in a three-guitar lineup, before his amicable departure in October 2023.

== Early days and the Lassie Foundation ==
Schroeder began taking formal guitar lessons from David Koval (Dakoda Motor Co. and Breakfast with Amy) at age twelve. When he was eighteen, he joined the band the Violet Burning, only to become a guitarist and one of the founding members of the shoegazing band the Lassie Foundation a few years later. The group described their style as "pink noise pop". Schroeder played guitar on three full-length albums and toured with the band from 1996 until they went on hiatus, in 2006.

He joined the Smashing Pumpkins' touring lineup in 2007 and also recorded for the new Lassie Foundation album in late 2007 and early 2008.

== The Smashing Pumpkins ==
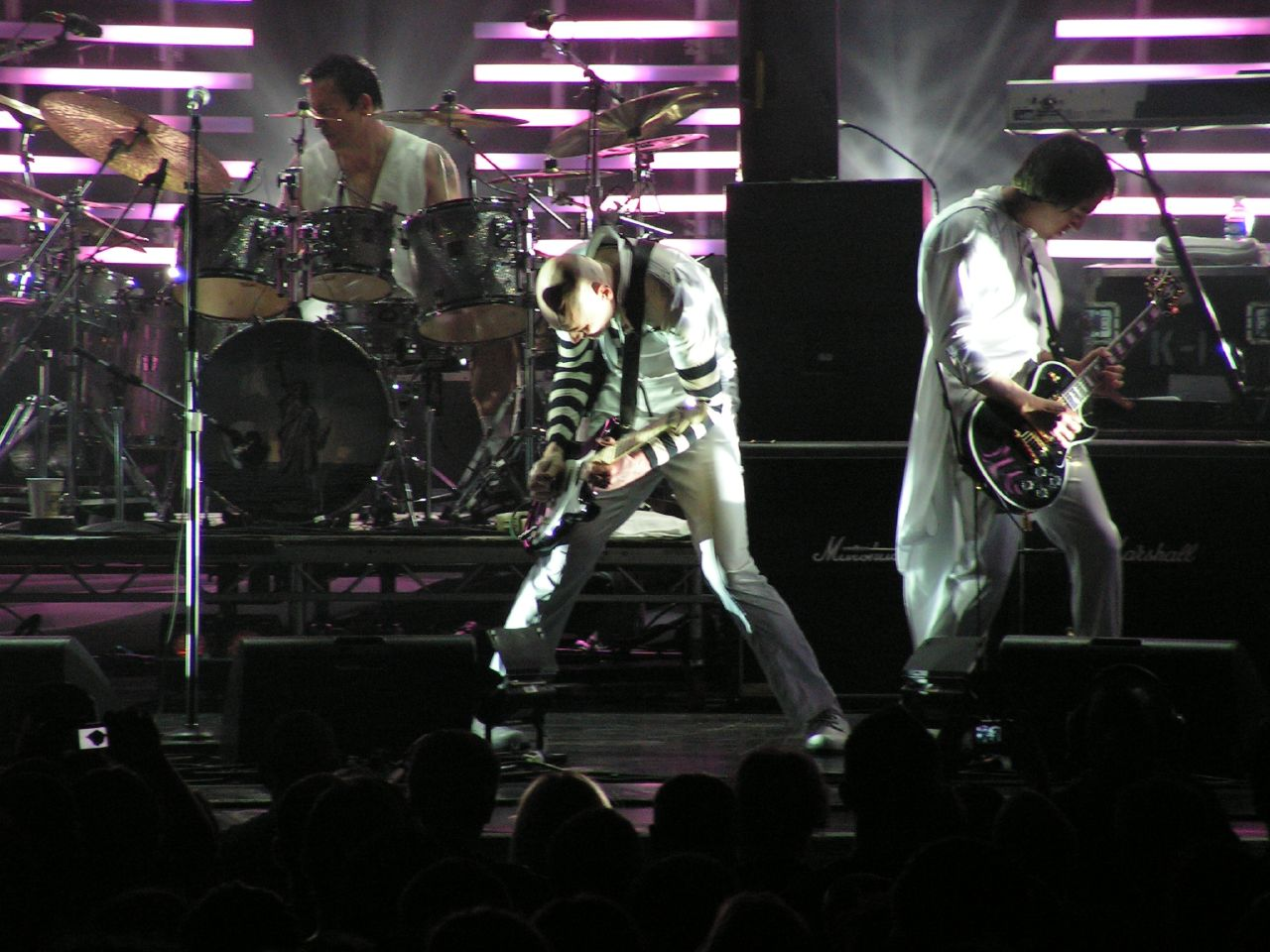
Schroeder (right) performing with the Smashing Pumpkins in 2007

On April 6, 2007, rock rumor webzine Buddyhead reported that Schroeder was the new guitarist for the Smashing Pumpkins, replacing James Iha. Schroeder toured with the band throughout 2007 and 2008 and appeared in the music videos for "Tarantula", "That's the Way (My Love Is)", and "G.L.O.W."

Following the departure of drummer Jimmy Chamberlin and fellow new addition Ginger Pooley in 2010, Schroeder remained the only member of the band besides Corgan still present from the 2007 revival show in Paris. Looking back on this time, Schroeder noted: "When I joined, the idea was the band was going to pick up and carry on what it started, or from where it left off. That would be making new music, doing tours focused on the new music and some of the stuff from the defining era. What we came up against was an industry that said, 'If you're going to be a successful band from the past, you're going to have to become a greatest hits band.' That wasn't something we were interested in doing, so things fragmented and fell apart. People left the band, and at one point, it was just Billy and me until we found [drummer] Mike Byrne and [bassist] Nicole Fiorentino."

In 2018, after performing and recording with the Smashing Pumpkins for over eleven years, Schroeder remained within the band's core lineup, alongside returning founding members James Iha and Jimmy Chamberlin. Reflecting on the importance of this, Schroeder noted: "I personally had a pretty touchy moment for myself in that I was sitting there tuning my guitar [in the studio], and then I looked around and saw Billy, Jimmy, and James. And then I look through the window and see [producer] Rick Rubin, and I thought like, 'Wow. This is a really special moment.' To think that when I joined the band it was such a different scenario, that to even think twelve years later you'd be at this point, it was really unfathomable. So I really kind of took a second and took it in."

Schroeder remained in the band's core lineup for the next five years, in which time they released Cyr in 2020 and Atum: A Rock Opera in Three Acts in 2023. In October 2023, he announced his amicable departure from the band via social media, "to explore a slightly different path". Reflecting upon his departure, Schroeder noted: "What I'm most proud of from when I joined the band in 2007 to when I left here in 2023 is the journey. With Jimmy, James, and Billy still there, I feel like the band is in a better place than when I joined, which feels very good and positive. Even though we went through some really rough and confusing years while trying to figure out how to be a band in this modern era, it feels positive."

== Gear ==
When performing live, Schroeder plays Yamaha guitars, including a Revstar Standard, as his main instrument, a custom Pacifica, and an SG. He also uses a Yamaha SA2200 semi-hollow guitar with Lollar Pickups. He has been a longtime Yamaha player and endorser. His main signal chain consists of two Line 6 Helix effect processors with Revv tube amplifier heads. He also uses a Malmsteen signature and an Origin Effects RevivalDrive overdrive pedal and a Vox Satchurator distortion pedal.

In the studio, Schroeder plays a Warm Machine by Carstens Amplification. "It's a 50-watt British-style, single-channel, point-to-point boutique type of amp. When I tried it I was like, "Wow, this is one of the best amps I've ever heard in my life!"

== Personal life ==
In 2014, Schroeder was finishing his PhD in comparative literature at UCLA, where he specializes in Asian American literature, Francophone literature, and critical theory.

== Discography ==
with the Smashing Pumpkins

- Teargarden by Kaleidyscope EPs and stand-alone songs (2009–2011)
- Oceania (2012)
- Monuments to an Elegy (2014)
- Shiny and Oh So Bright, Vol. 1 / LP: No Past. No Future. No Sun. (2018)
- Cyr (2020)
- Atum: A Rock Opera in Three Acts (2022–2023)

with the Violet Burning

- The Violet Burning (1996)

with the Lassie Foundation

- Pacifico (1999)
- The El Dorado L.P. (2001)
- Face Your Fun (2004)

Solo

- Metanoia (2024)
