= Justin Coloma =

- Born: October 31, 1975 (age 49); Los Angeles, California, U.S.
- Occupation: Film director
- Years active: 1998 – present

Justin Coloma (born October 31, 1975) is a Peruvian American film director and editor.

== Biography ==
Justin Coloma was raised in Lima, Peru, and moved to California in 1992. He received a Bachelor of Arts in Film Studies from The University of California, Berkeley, in 1998. He is best known for his music video work with Smashing Pumpkins, including "Superchrist" and "G.L.O.W.".

He was the principal editor of If All Goes Wrong, produced by Coming Home Studios, which chronicles the Smashing Pumpkins' 12 show residency at the Fillmore in San Francisco in July and August 2007.

Justin Coloma married Linda Strawberry on July 18, 2009.

== Videography ==
2003

- Eagles of Death Metal – "Midnight Creeper"

2007

- Linda Strawberry – "Dig"

2008

- Smashing Pumpkins – "G.L.O.W."
- Smashing Pumpkins – "Superchrist"

2009

- The Higher – "It's Only Natural"
- Boomkat – "Lonely Child"
- Miss Derringer – "Click Click Bang Bang"

2010

- Morgan Page – "Fight For You"

2011

- Morgan Page – "I've Had Friends"
- Peter Murphy – "I Spit Roses"
- Peter Murphy – "Seesaw Sway"
- Peter Murphy – "The Prince and Old Lady Shade"
- Uh Huh Her – "Black and Blue"
- Uh Huh Her – "Another Case"
- Uh Huh Her – "Wake to Sleep"
- Morgan Page – "In the Air"

2012

- Ashlee Simpson – "Bat for a Heart"

2013

- Delta Rae – "If I Loved You"
- Echosmith – "Come Together"

2021

- Jessica Simpson - "Particles"
