= Zeitgeist (The Smashing Pumpkins album) =

- Standard edition cover art by Shepard Fairey; different retailers had green, orange, silver, purple, or blue covers

Studio album by the Smashing Pumpkins
- Released: July 9, 2007
- Recorded: August 2006 – February 2007
- Genres: Alternative rock; hard rock; alternative metal
- Length: 52:22
- Labels: Martha's; Reprise
- Producers: Billy Corgan; Jimmy Chamberlin; Terry Date; Roy Thomas Baker

The Smashing Pumpkins chronology
Earphoria (2002)	Zeitgeist (2007)	American Gothic (2008)

Singles from Zeitgeist
- 1. "Tarantula" Released: May 21, 2007; 2. "That's the Way (My Love Is)" Released: September 10, 2007

Zeitgeist is the seventh studio album by American rock band the Smashing Pumpkins, first released on July 9, 2007 (Note: Its release in the United States and Canada was on Tuesday July 10, 2007. In some other countries including the United Kingdom it was released the day before on July 9.) on Martha's Music and Reprise Records. Recorded solely by returning members Billy Corgan and Jimmy Chamberlin, the album was the band's first since reuniting in 2006. It was produced by Roy Thomas Baker and Terry Date, alongside Corgan and Chamberlin.

Preceded by the single "Tarantula", the album debuted at number two on the US Billboard 200, but sales soon decreased, and critical reception was mixed. It was certified Gold in the United States on February 1, 2008. To tour in support of the release, Corgan and Chamberlin recruited touring members Jeff Schroeder (guitar), Ginger Reyes (bass), and Lisa Harriton (keyboards), with Schroeder eventually becoming a core member of the band. The album was the last to feature Chamberlin until 2018's Shiny and Oh So Bright, Vol. 1 / LP: No Past. No Future. No Sun.

== Background ==
After the Smashing Pumpkins disbanded in 2000, Corgan and Chamberlin reunited for the short-lived supergroup Zwan, also featuring members of Slint, Chavez, and A Perfect Circle. The group released one album, Mary Star of the Sea in early 2003, before dissolving six months after the release. Chamberlin then formed Jimmy Chamberlin Complex, while Corgan would focus on a solo album. On June 21, 2005, the day of the release of his album TheFutureEmbrace, Corgan took out full-page advertisements in the Chicago Tribune and Chicago Sun-Times to announce that he had "made plans to renew and revive the Smashing Pumpkins." Chamberlin soon announced that he would be rejoining the band, and the two began living together in north Scottsdale, Arizona in November 2005, writing and rehearsing new songs. Within three weeks of practicing, the pair decided they had recaptured the sound of the band and prepared to record a new album.

On April 20, 2006, the band's website confirmed that the band had reunited and started work on a new album. The website later announced that the new album would be produced by Roy Thomas Baker. Chamberlin and Corgan were verified as participants in the reunion, but there was question as to whether other former members of the band would participate. In April 2007, James Iha and Melissa Auf der Maur separately confirmed that they were not taking part in the reunion.

== Recording ==
With the other band members absent, Chamberlin and Corgan decided to record the album alone, which Corgan claims is not a serious departure from how previous Pumpkins albums were made. After the songs were finalized, Chamberlin laid down all of the drum tracks. Notably, the drums for the ten-minute track "United States" were recorded in one live take. After the drums were completed, Chamberlin began the process of interviewing prospective touring band members, while Corgan went about recording the guitar, bass, keyboard, and vocal parts. Chamberlin described the recording sessions as a "long laborious process to greatness". For the first time on a Smashing Pumpkins record, Chamberlin served as one of the producers, and was present and influential through much more of the recording process than he typically has been.

The band's insistence on recording live to tape, without click tracks or editing, was met with distaste by most producers they spoke to. One executive at Reprise suggested using American Idiot producer Rob Cavallo, in the name of commercial success. The band held out until they met someone willing to record analog, and with the right energy and philosophy, eventually choosing producer Roy Thomas Baker, whom they considered "a real soul mate." Terry Date also contributed, and, according to Corgan, Date's production style helped the songs "resonate on a physical level". The album was largely recorded in the home studio of former Catherine drummer (and D'arcy Wretzky's ex-husband) Kerry Brown, on the same 24-track tape recorder that 1995's Mellon Collie and the Infinite Sadness was recorded on—in fact, no computers were used for the recording of the album. As with the other Smashing Pumpkins albums, Zeitgeist was recorded in twelve-hour days, six or seven days a week, until it was finished. The mixing process also differed from previous albums'. According to Baker, "everything had sort of an on/off switch. So instead of having various degrees of volumes, we'd have the approach of, 'It's either on or it's not'".

== Style ==
Chamberlin explained the Pumpkins' goals for the album:

The mindset of the record was to put our best foot forward and not get too artsy. We wanted to try to create a body of work that was concentrated enough to bring back a fan base and invigorate a new fan base. We kept it pretty close to the chest, and we didn't branch out too deep into art zone while we were writing the record.

Corgan said the album's goals were threefold—to make an accessible, mainstream rock record, to comment on the "emerging fascist" political climate of the United States, and to explore the nature of his band and his friendship with Chamberlin. Although Corgan has, in the past, said a political slant from Smashing Pumpkins would be "not right", Zeitgeist stands as the most overtly political work ever released by the band or Corgan himself, which Chamberlin attributes to the band's interest in the music and life of Fela Kuti.

Corgan's mantra for the album's rhythm parts was "Shuffle!", which Jimmy Chamberlin resisted, but which eventually resulted in two songs on the albums with shuffle beats.

The album is among the heavier releases by Smashing Pumpkins. Corgan attributes this to his perception that "people wanted to hear some energy, that they didn't want us rolling over and crying in our milk". He compared the mindset of the record to that of Gish, which was to make a statement "without trying to make the next The Wall." Regarding the aggressive drumming on the album, Chamberlin observes that "the world is ready for something with some balls behind it."

The album has prominent vocal overdubs – nearly every song has multiple layers of Corgan's voice, a decision brought about by Baker's operatic production style as well as the knowledge that the new touring members would be able to sing harmonies.

The song "Bleeding the Orchid," about the commercial exploitation of the early-90s alternative rock movement, was deliberately styled after the music of Alice in Chains, a band that Corgan now greatly admires. "Pomp and Circumstances" was set to have string arrangements by Danny Elfman, but when he amicably withdrew from the project, the band decided to create its own synthesized orchestration.

== Development and promotion ==
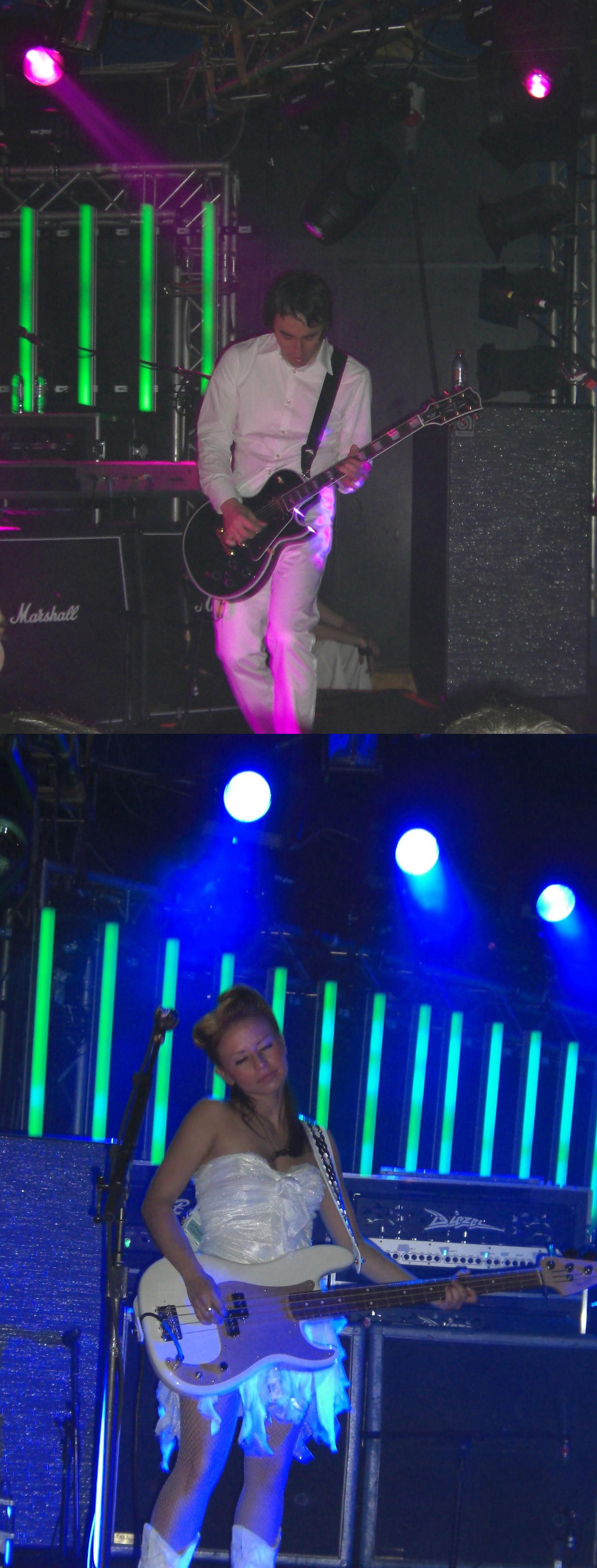
Jeff Schroeder and Ginger Reyes made their debut with the Smashing Pumpkins on May 22, 2007 in Paris, France. They only toured with the band; Corgan and Chamberlin recorded the album themselves.

"Tarantula" was announced and released as the album's first single on May 23, 2007. The track "Doomsday Clock" appeared on the soundtrack of the film Transformers. On June 19, 2007, the track was released to iTunes. On July 2, 2007, the entire album was posted on Muchmusic for free streaming.

=== Tour ===
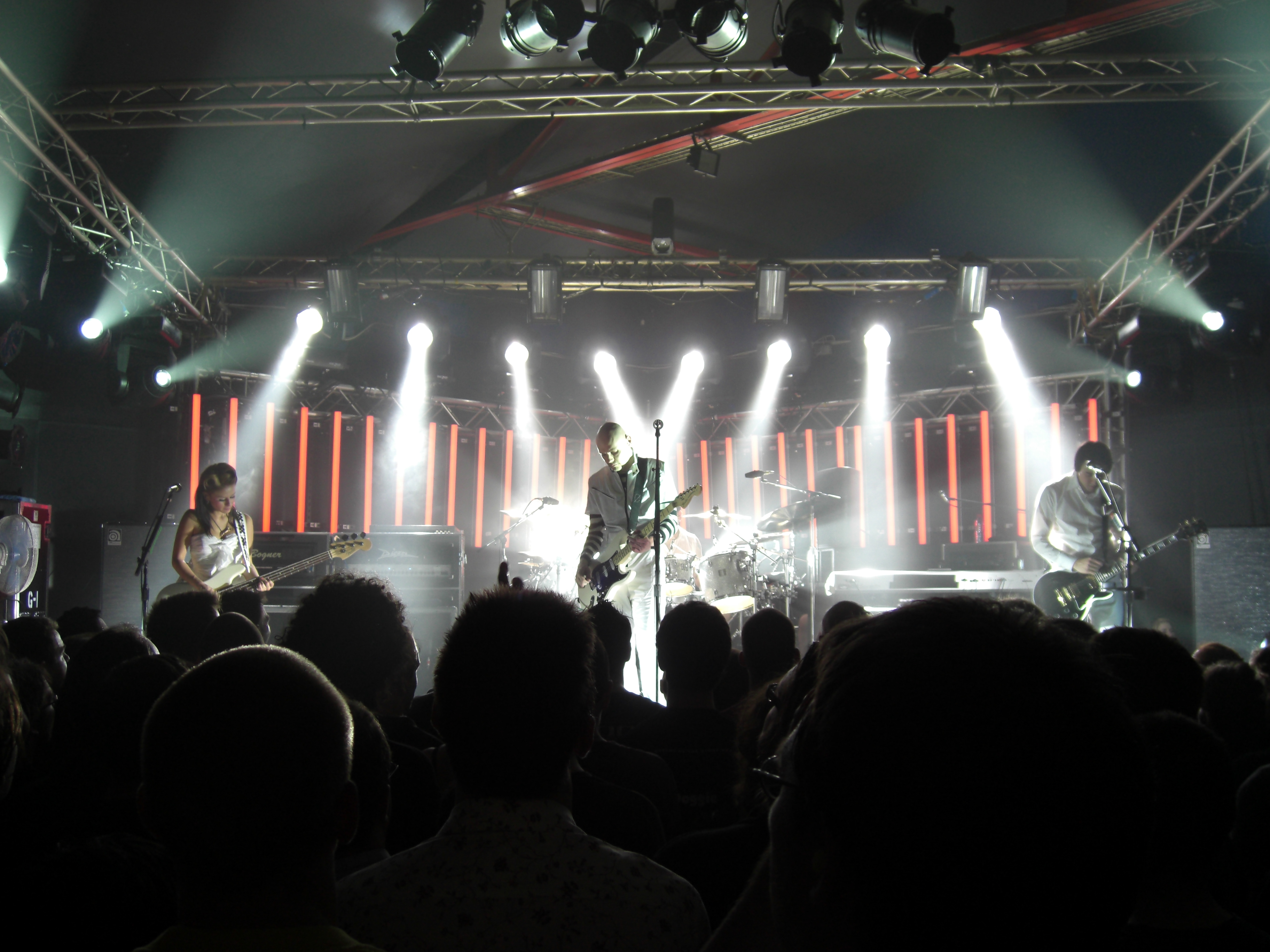
The Smashing Pumpkins on May 24, 2007, in Luxembourg City. Left to right: Ginger Reyes, Billy Corgan, Jimmy Chamberlin (back), Jeff Schroeder

Prior to the album's release, the reunited Smashing Pumpkins made their debut performing live for the first time on May 22, 2007 in Paris, France. There, the band unveiled new members Jeff Schroeder and Ginger Reyes, who took over rhythm guitar and bass duties, respectively. Lisa Harriton completed the line-up on keyboards and vocals.

Finishing their debut leg in Europe in June 2007, the band would continue touring, repeatedly jumping between Europe and North America. The band returned stateside for an American leg of their tour kicked off with a sold-out, nine-day residency at the Orange Peel in Asheville, North Carolina, on June 23, 2007. A similar residency at The Fillmore was chronicled for the DVD If All Goes Wrong. The tour would also include an appearance at Al Gore's Live Earth festival on July 7, 2007, three days before the North American release of the album. Europe would see the band return on another European leg on August 12, 2007, in Stockholm, Sweden and when the band headlined Reading and Leeds Festivals on the August bank holiday weekend of 2007 in England. The Pumpkins returned in September 2007 to play shows in North America, and continued until mid-November. On January 28, 2008, the band returned to Europe to play shows in the Czech Republic and Austria and playing their first Belfast performance in February. They later went on to perform at London's O2 Arena in England, each show attracted a sell out crowd with the London concert attracting over 20,000 people to the O2. Apart from Europe, the band co-headlined the 2008 V Festival in Australia, and played three gigs in New Zealand.

== Release ==
Zeitgeist debuted at #2 on the Billboard 200, selling 145,000 copies in its first week. It also reached the top spots on Billboard's Internet Albums and Rock Albums charts in its first week, and hit the top 10 in Canada (#1), New Zealand (#1), the United Kingdom (#4), Germany (#7), Australia (#7), and other countries. The album was certified gold by the RIAA with 500,000 copies shipped as of February 1, 2008.

The album isn't available on digital streaming services—the songs are considered "out of print".

== Reception ==
Professional ratings
Aggregate scores
Source	Rating
Metacritic	59/100
Review scores
Source	Rating
AllMusic	2/5 stars
Drowned in Sound	5/10
Entertainment Weekly	B
The Guardian	2/5 stars
Melodic	3/5 stars
Pitchfork	4.9/10
PopMatters	8/10 stars
Rolling Stone	4/5 stars
Spin	7/10
Stylus Magazine	D+

Zeitgeist received mixed reviews, indicated by a score of 59/100 on Metacritic. Some negative criticism of the album stemmed from the absence of half of the original lineup, with Pitchfork's Rob Mitchum suggesting the name was revived for "cash or attention or both." Q's Paul Rees commented that "at least half of Zeitgeist is made up of grinding songs that amount to riffs, pummelling and little else," and that Zeitgeist's emotional range is "limited and wearing", but praised Chamberlin's drumming, stating that he "remains one of the most powerful drummers in rock." In addition, Modern Drummer proclaimed that the album contains "Chamberlin's greatest drumming ever put to CD." NME gave it a score of five out of ten and said, "It's best treated as a curio in the Smashing Pumpkins' legacy; and for those who grew up on 'Today', '1979' and 'Ava Adore', you're better left with your memories." The A.V. Club gave it a C+ and said that it "ends up sounding like a Corgan career retrospective in B-side form." musicOMH gave it a score of two-and-a-half stars out of five and said, "Recounting such thoughts, by this point almost an hour has been spent in the company of a record which stares back at you with the appeal of an ex you'd rather not have bumped into." Hot Press gave it a mixed review and said, "The best you can offer is that it's not a disaster – now do you want to tell Billy or should I?" Robert Christgau simply gave the record a "Dud" rating. Slant Magazine gave it a score of two out of five and called it "the Pumpkins' most aggressively metal album to date. But heaps of guitars, vocal overdubs, and ridiculous effects don't mask a lack of inventiveness or even plain ol' quality songwriting." Canadian magazine Now also gave it a score of two stars out of five and called it "no-frills rawk that's been dumbed down for mass consumption." Melodic magazine gave it a score of three stars out of five, calling the album a disappointing return of the band. Tiny Mix Tapes gave it a score of one-and-a-half stars out of five and said that "the mixing problems extend far beyond Corgan's voice. The Band of a Hundred Murderous Guitars has turned into a modern-radio-rock band."

However, the album garnered higher marks from other sources, including ratings of 4/5 from Rolling Stone, and Uncut. Positive reviews have downplayed the personnel changes, pointing out Corgan's dominance over songwriting and music throughout the band's history. The album was praised by April Long of Uncut for its energy and retention of Smashing Pumpkins' "signature goth-metal-shoegaze sound." Spence D. of IGN gave the album a score of 6.9 out of 10 and said, "Zeitgeist isn't a bad album; it's just not a great album. Which means that it's rather indicative of the times. ... Here's to hoping that the next Pumpkins outing gives into the experimental urge and builds upon the intriguing elements displayed on the album's final two songs. Though we aren't beyond hoping that they keep a little of the apocalyptic crunch intact for good measure, as well." John Cruz of Sputnikmusic gave it a score of 3.5 out of 5 and said, "While not enough to stand among the best the Pumpkins have to offer, Zeigeist nonetheless stands fairly well on its own, Smashing Pumpkins or no." This album was #43 on Rolling Stone's list of the Top 50 Albums of 2007.

=== Legacy ===
The album divided the Pumpkins' fanbase. Corgan would later admit, "I know a lot of our fans are puzzled by Zeitgeist. I think they wanted this massive, grandiose work, but you don't just roll out of bed after seven years without a functioning band and go back to doing that". Regarding the album's sales and overall reception in 2010, Corgan stated that the album "went gold. But people didn't listen to it. I could tell that people weren't listening to the album. In the past if you put out an album, people at least knew the first song. We would go out and play "Doomsday Clock" and I could tell that they hadn't even listened to it. I don't view it as a gross disappointment. It's disappointing to me that what I was trying to communicate didn't get the chance to be communicated."

== Artwork ==
On May 6, 2007, four photographs of the album booklet artwork were leaked on Netphoria, a Smashing Pumpkins fan message board. The band management soon released a statement to the media stating the photos are "stolen goods" that should not be posted on the Internet. Later in the week, the alleged thieves were identified as Joshua Kuhl and Simon Brown, both 21. The Chicago Police announced that 39 photographs and three guitar picks were stolen, although only four to six of those photographs were leaked online. The two were held on $100,000 bond. Asked about the band's predicament, a Chicago police officer commented, "They were pissed." The pair were arrested and charged with felony burglary after other tenants of the building provided a description that led police to the suspects.

On May 16, 2007, the band's official website published an official album cover made by Obey Giant graphic designer and illustrator Shepard Fairey: a red, black and white illustration of a drowning Statue of Liberty, positioned in front of the sun. Fairey, whose credits include creating anti-war posters and the poster art for the feature film Walk the Line, commented on the album cover:

I think global warming is an issue that is currently relevant, time sensitive, and a symptom of the shortsightedness of the U.S. As a broader metaphor, the drowning Statue of Liberty, a revered icon of the U.S., symbolizes the eminent [sic] demise of many of the ideals upon which the nation was founded. Civil liberties, freedom of speech, privacy, etc. have been decreasing since 9/11. The sun in the image could either be setting or rising and this ambiguity shows that there is still hope to turn things around ... The U.S. is the dominant global force. When things are going wrong in the U.S. they are probably going wrong around the world. I think this image conveys both the U.S. situation and its larger global implications.

Corgan commented, "Like a great artist can do, Shepard had summed up very simply a lot of complex themes. He also used the type font from our very first single, and I asked him about it and he had no idea. He was just on point." Fairey also remarked "I use red frequently because it is a visually powerful, emotionally potent color. Red gets people's attention. In this case there is the added possibility that the red liquid could be blood, giving it an even more sinister sense of foreboding." The red color of the artwork was changed for most of the special edition releases. The Best Buy reissue features a black-and-white version of the original artwork.

== Track listing ==
All tracks are written by Billy Corgan.

Original issue (Red cover)
No.	Title	Producer(s)	Length
1.	"Doomsday Clock"	Billy Corgan; Jimmy Chamberlin	3:44
2.	"7 Shades of Black"	Corgan; Chamberlin	3:17
3.	"Bleeding the Orchid"	Corgan; Chamberlin	4:03
4.	"That's the Way (My Love Is)"	Corgan; Chamberlin; Terry Date	3:48
5.	"Tarantula"	Corgan; Chamberlin	3:51
6.	"Starz"	Corgan; Chamberlin; Roy Thomas Baker	3:43
7.	"United States"	Corgan; Chamberlin	9:52
8.	"Neverlost"	Corgan; Chamberlin; Date	4:20
9.	"Bring the Light"	Corgan; Chamberlin; Baker	3:40
10.	"(Come On) Let's Go!"	Corgan; Chamberlin; Date	3:19
11.	"For God and Country"	Corgan; Chamberlin; Date	4:24
12.	"Pomp and Circumstances"	Corgan; Chamberlin; Baker (additional production)	4:21
Total length:			52:22

Target edition bonus track (Purple cover)
No.	Title	Producer(s)	Length
13.	"Zeitgeist"	Corgan; Chamberlin	2:49

Best Buy reissue + DVD (Silver cover)
No.	Title	Producer(s)	Length
1.	"Doomsday Clock"		3:44
2.	"7 Shades of Black"		3:17
3.	"Bleeding the Orchid"		4:03
4.	"That's the Way (My Love Is)"		3:48
5.	"Tarantula"		3:51
6.	"Starz"		3:43
7.	"United States"		9:52
8.	"Death from Above"	Corgan; Chamberlin; Date	4:07
9.	"Bring the Light"		3:41
10.	"(Come On) Let's Go!"		3:19
11.	"Neverlost"		4:20
12.	"Stellar"	Corgan; Chamberlin	6:22
13.	"Ma Belle"	Corgan; Chamberlin; Date	4:08
14.	"For God and Country"		4:24
15.	"Pomp and Circumstances"		4:21

== Alternative versions ==
Zeitgeist was released in multiple special editions in six different colors with 16 tracks in total. Three American versions each had a unique bonus track, but were exclusive to the iTunes Store, Best Buy, and Target. This move was criticized by Pitchfork and Rolling Stone. In October 2007, less than four months after the album's release, Best Buy released an exclusive reissue of Zeitgeist that included three bonus tracks (one exclusive) and a DVD. Finally, in January 2008, iTunes released a "Deluxe Edition" that included the American Gothic EP.

Variant editions of Zeitgeist
Color	Version	Distinction
Red	Regular version	Includes the 12 tracks listed above
Red	Deluxe edition	Includes 76-page book
Red	Japanese version	Includes "Death from Above" (at track 13)
Orange	Best Buy version	Includes "Death from Above" (at track 9)
Orange	German Amazon.de version	Includes "Death from Above" (at track 9)
Purple	UK version	Standard track listing
Purple	Target version	Includes "Zeitgeist" (at track 13)
Purple	Müller version	Includes "Zeitgeist" (at track 13)
Green	HMV version	Standard track listing
Blue	iTunes version	Includes "Stellar" (at track 11), 5 MySpace covers (for U.S. pre-order), "Zeitgeist" (for international pre-order)
Blue	iTunes Deluxe edition (January 2008)	Includes American Gothic EP, as well as videos of "Tarantula" and "That's the Way"
Silver	Best Buy CD/DVD edition (October 2007)	Resequenced track listing and three bonus tracks: "Death From Above", "Stellar", and "Ma Belle"; plus bonus DVD disc with a 20-minute documentary, Inside the Zeitgeist, and the music videos for "Tarantula" and "That's the Way"

== Outtakes ==
The following songs were written for Zeitgeist but did not make any version of the released album.

- "Gossamer" – played on the summer leg of the Zeitgeist tour, and a regular feature of Smashing Pumpkins live sets right up to 2010. Its debut at the first Paris show indicates that it was written during the Zeitgeist sessions, but this is not confirmed. Ranging from 15 to 35 minutes, it was played throughout the 2007 tour. Chamberlin and Corgan confirmed in an August 2007 interview that this song was recorded live at the Fillmore and has been released on the DVD If All Goes Wrong.
- "Signal to Noise" – covered by Matt Walker's new band, The Most Dangerous Race, for the Myspace cover album project. This cover also appears on a compilation tribute CD to the band by the German magazine Visions. A version of this song by the Smashing Pumpkins has yet to be revealed.
- "Superchrist" – written during the Zeitgeist sessions, Corgan opted against recording the track for the album, stating that he "didn't understand the song, and thought playing it on tour would help us sort it out." Superchrist received its live debut on July 24, 2007 during their residency at The Fillmore, and would go on to become a staple of the bands' live shows by the time it was finally recorded in January 2008 at Sunset Sound. Co-produced by Kerry Brown of the band Catherine (and also the ex-husband of former Smashing Pumpkins bassist, D'arcy Wretzky), the song was highly publicized by the band, including a music video that debuted on MySpace on February 27, 2008; it was also notable for being the band's first release without a record label. The song was initially available in a limited capacity on the compilation Fresh Cuts: Volume 2. Available solely in Guitar Center outlets, the album otherwise featured songs performed by Guitar Center employees. A more general release was later given to the track digitally on the iTunes Store on November 4, 2008, packaged with "G.L.O.W." as a 'digital 45".'
- "FOL" – released for free download after debuting on national television in a Hyundai Genesis coupe commercial prior to Super Bowl XLIII.

== Personnel ==
=== The Smashing Pumpkins ===
- Jimmy Chamberlin – drums, percussion, production
- Billy Corgan – vocals, guitar, bass guitar, keyboards, production

=== Production ===
- Roy Thomas Baker – production and recording (tracks 6, 9, 12), additional production (tracks 5, 12), mixing
- Terry Date – production (tracks 4, 8, 10, 11), recording (except tracks 6, 9)
- Bruce Dickson, Justin Corrigan – photo shoot art supervision
- Shepard Fairey – cover art, back cover design
- Amber Griffin – photo shoot hair and makeup
- Stephen Marcussen – mastering
- Cynthia Obsenares – photo shoot costume design
- Chris Owens, Kevin Mills, Alex Pavlides, Zephyrus Sowers, Bo Joe, Davey Rieley – assistant engineering
- Vanessa Parr, Noel Zancanella – mix assistance and assistant engineering
- Matt Taylor – package art direction and design
- Bjorn Thorsrud – recording (tracks 1, 2, 3, 5, 7, 12), mix assistance
- Christina Wagner – photo shoot producer

=== Reissue personnel ===
- Kristin Burns – "in studio" photography
- Linda Strawberry – "in studio" photo-illustrations

=== Inside the Zeitgeist ===
- P. R. Brown – director, "Tarantula" and "That's the Way (My Love Is)" videos
- Kristin Burns, Lisa Johnson – still photography
- Bruce Dickson – studio footage
- Will Knapp – editing
- Janelle Lopez – associate production
- On the Scene Productions, Inc.; Vision Istanbul Prod. Services; Speedway Films – interview footage
- Jared Paul, Devin Sarno, Rob Gordon – executive production

== Charts ==
=== Weekly charts ===
Weekly chart performance for Zeitgeist
Chart (2007)	Peak position
Australian Albums (ARIA)	7
Austrian Albums (Ö3 Austria)	5
Belgian Albums (Ultratop Flanders)	6
Belgian Albums (Ultratop Wallonia)	8
Canadian Albums (Billboard)	1
Danish Albums (Hitlisten)	14
Dutch Albums (Album Top 100)	7
Finnish Albums (Suomen virallinen lista)	11
French Albums (SNEP)	24
German Albums (Offizielle Top 100)	7
Irish Albums (IRMA)	5
Italian Albums (FIMI)	5
Japanese Albums (Oricon)	11
New Zealand Albums (RMNZ)	14
Norwegian Albums (VG-lista)	1
Portuguese Albums (AFP)	7
Scottish Albums (Official Charts)	7
Spanish Albums (Promusicae)	19
Swedish Albums (Sverigetopplistan)	15
Swiss Albums (Schweizer Hitparade)	5
UK Albums (Official Charts)	4
US Billboard 200	2
US Top Album Sales (Billboard)	2
US Top Alternative Albums (Billboard)	1
US Top Hard Rock Albums (Billboard)	1
US Top Current Album Sales (Billboard)	2
US Top Rock Albums (Billboard)	1

=== Year-end charts ===
Year-end chart performance for Zetigeist
Chart (2007)	Position
US Billboard 200	165

== Certifications ==
Certifications for Zeitgeist
Region	Certification	Certified units/sales
New Zealand (RMNZ)	Gold	7,500^{^}
United States (RIAA)	Gold	500,000^{^}
^{^} Shipments figures based on certification alone.
