= If All Goes Wrong =

Video by The Smashing Pumpkins
- Released: November 11, 2008
- Recorded: 2007
- Genre: Alternative rock
- Length: 271:00
- Label: Coming Home Media
- Director: Jack Gulick and Daniel Catullo
- Producer: Jack Gulick and Daniel Catullo

Professional ratings
Review scores
Source	Rating
About.com	link
PopMatters	(The Fillmore Residency) (Live from the Floor of the Fillmore) link
Rolling Stone	link
Short and Sweet NYC	(favorable) link
CommonLine	(favorable) link

If All Goes Wrong is a feature-length documentary about The Smashing Pumpkins, which chronicles the band's residencies at The Orange Peel in Asheville and The Fillmore in San Francisco in summer 2007. It was screened, in competition, at Ghent Film Festival in October 2008. It also screened in select theaters in the United States on November 6, 2008, as well as in other countries, including the United Kingdom, Canada, Germany, Australia and New Zealand.

The documentary covers Pumpkins frontman Billy Corgan's attempts to write and debut new music at the residencies, as well as the revival of the band with new members. Much of the documentary deals with the struggle to remain relevant as a band, both artistically and commercially.

The documentary was released as part of a two-disc DVD set. The first disc contains the documentary, as well as Voices of the Ghost Children, a featurette about the band's fans, and an interview with The Who guitarist Pete Townshend. The second disc contains 15 songs recorded at various points during the residency, all mixed in surround sound with five songs recorded during rehearsals on the floor of the venue included.

On February 14, 2009, the DVD won Outstanding Achievement in Sound Mixing in the DVD Original Programming category at the Cinema Audio Society awards.

== Track listing ==
The Fillmore Residency

1. "The Rose March"
2. "Peace + Love"
3. "99 Floors"
4. "Blue Skies Bring Tears"
5. "Superchrist"
6. "Lucky 13"
7. "Starla"
8. "Death from Above"
9. "The Crying Tree of Mercury"
10. "Winterlong"
11. "Heavy Metal Machine"
12. "Untitled"
13. "No Surrender"
14. "Gossamer"
15. "Zeitgeist"

Live from the Floor of the Fillmore

1. "99 Floors"
2. "Peace + Love"
3. "Mama"
4. "No Surrender"
5. "Promise Me"

== Release history ==
- United States, Canada: November 11, 2008
- Australia: November 14, 2008
- The Netherlands: November 24, 2008
- United Kingdom: December 1, 2008

== Personnel ==
The Smashing Pumpkins

- Billy Corgan – Vocals, guitar
- Jimmy Chamberlin – Drums, Guitar on "Zeitgeist"
- Ginger Reyes – Bass, vocals
- Jeff Schroeder – Guitar, vocals
- Lisa Harriton – Keyboards, vocals

Production

- Jack Gulick – producer, director
- Daniel Catullo – producer, director
- Tilton Gardner – executive producer
- Jeff Geoffray – executive producer
- Walter Josten – executive producer
- Justin Coloma – principal editor
- Jon Lemon – live audio mixer
- Kerry Brown – re-recording audio mixer
- Kevin Dippold – re-recording audio mixer
- Brian Slack – re-recording audio mixer
- Linda Strawberry – cover artist
- Lauren DiSalvi-Salciccia – transcriptionist
- Kateri Forbes – Corgan's personal assistant

== Chart positions ==
Year	Chart	Peak position
2008	Billboard Top Music Video	4
