= Halo Friendlies =

American pop punk band

- Also known as: The Halo Friendlies
- Origin: Long Beach, California, U.S.
- Genres: Pop punk; punk rock; emo pop
- Years active: 1998–2004
- Labels: Jackson Rubio, Tooth & Nail Records
- Past members: Judita Wignall; Ginger Pooley; Natalie Bolanos; Claudia Rossi; Deanna Moody; Cheryl Hecht; Christina Hock

The Halo Friendlies were an American all-female pop punk band from Long Beach, California. After snatching up a guitar in a thrift shop while on her first date with then-boyfriend now-husband Matt Wignall of Havalina/Matt Death and the New Intellectuals, Judita Wignall made the decision to start a band. Originally featuring Wignall on lead vocals and guitar, Cheryl Hecht on guitar, Natalie Bolanos on bass guitar, Tafida Allen on drums, and Deanna Moody on percussion on their 1998 self-titled debut, by 1999's Acid Wash, Hecht had dropped out of the project. She was then replaced by Ginger Reyes, who not only began sharing lead vocals with Wignall, but also took up bass guitar, allowing Bolanos to switch to lead guitar. In 2000 the Halo Friendlies replaced Moody with Christina Hock (Theobald). Theobald/Hock, however, was replaced shortly before the band's first sweep of the United Kingdom in 2003 by Claudia Rossi (ex-Jack Off Jill).

The Halo Friendlies were an overtly Christian band, but when they broached religious topics they weren't dogmatic.

Currently, the band is on an indefinite hiatus to allow its members some time for solo creative efforts.

From April 2007 until March 2010, Ginger Reyes played bass guitar for The Smashing Pumpkins.

== In popular culture ==
They had a song called "Me vs. the world" which appears on the Freaky Friday soundtrack, while the video for the song appears on the Freaky Friday DVD.

They appear in season 6 episode 9 of Buffy the Vampire Slayer titled "Smashed" and perform their song "Run Away".

They also appear on the track "Play it Loud" on MxPx's 2003 release Before Everything & After.

Some of their tracks, such as "Over It" and "Anything For You" appeared on the TV series Joan Of Arcadia.

Judita Wignall (with Scouts of St. Sebastian) sang vocals on "In Love", a bonus song from the 2007 video game Guitar Hero III.

== Members ==
- Natalie Bolanos – bass, lead guitar, backing vocals (1998–2004)
- Judita Wignall – lead and backing vocals, guitar (1998–2004)
- Tafida Allen – drums (1998)
- Ginger Reyes – bass, backing and lead vocals (1999–2004)
- Claudia Rossi – drums (2003–2004)
- Cheryl Hecht – guitar (1998–1999)
- Deanna Moody – drums (1998–2000)
- Christina Hock – drums (2000–2003)

== Discography ==
- Halo Friendlies (1998, Jackson Rubio, Review: The Phantom Tollbooth, HM Magazine)
- Acid Wash (1999, Jackson Rubio, Review: The Phantom Tollbooth, HM Magazine)
- Ghetto Demo (2000)
- Get Real (2002, Tooth & Nail)

== See also ==
- List of all-women bands
