= Doomsday Clock (song) =

2007 Smashing Pumpkins song

Song by the Smashing Pumpkins

from the album Zeitgeist and Transformers: The Album
- Recorded: 2007
- Genre: Stoner rock
- Length: 3:42
- Label: Reprise Records
- Songwriter: Billy Corgan
- Producers: Billy Corgan and Jimmy Chamberlin

Audio sample
- file; help

"Doomsday Clock" is a song by the American alternative rock group the Smashing Pumpkins, and is the opening track on their album Zeitgeist. Although not released as a single, the song charted on the Billboard Hot 100 and the Pop 100, due to digital sales.

It was released on iTunes for immediate download along with the pre-order for the album on June 19, 2007.

It is also included on the soundtrack for the 2007 Transformers movie. The song appears twice in the film: once as an instrumental-only version during a climactic action sequence, and the second time as a song over the closing credits. It's also heard in the second trailer for the 2008 Marvel Studios movie The Incredible Hulk.

The song's original arrangement was described by Jimmy Chamberlin as "folk/calypso" and was eventually slowed down and made much heavier for the recorded version.

In early 2008, "Doomsday Clock" was licensed to the professional wrestling outfit Ring of Honor for use as the theme song of the taped pay-per-view, ROH Undeniable.

== Chart positions ==
Chart (2007)	Peak position
U.S. Billboard Pop 100	81
U.S. Billboard Hot 100	97

== See also ==
- Doomsday Clock
