= Daniel Catullo =

American film director

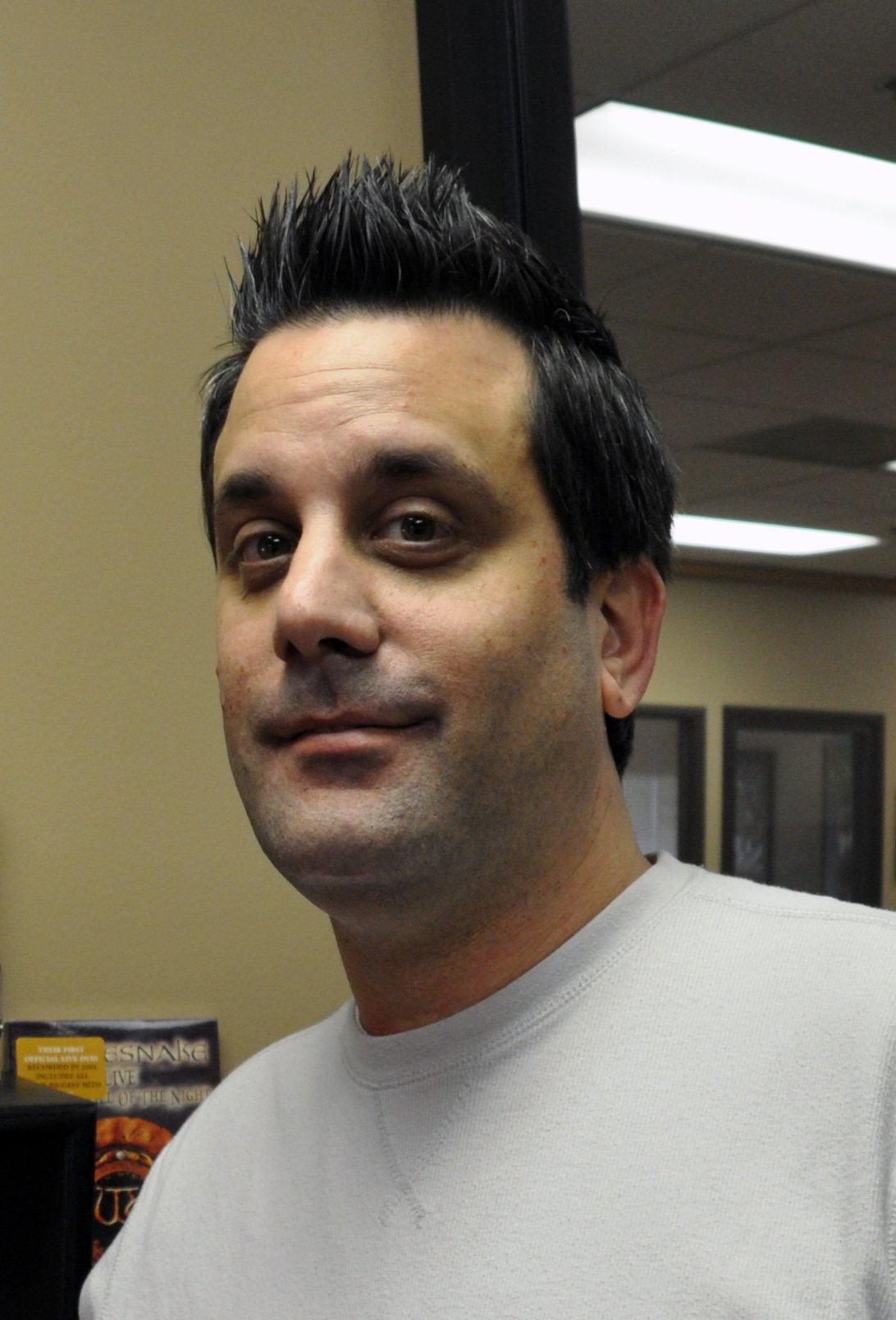
- Born: Daniel Edward Catullo III; Yonkers, New York, United States
- Occupations: Concert promoter, director, producer
- Years active: 1991–present
- Spouse: Madelyn
- Parent(s): Daniel and Dolores Catullo
- Website: www.dc3global.com

Daniel E. "Dan" Catullo III is an American concert promoter, director, and producer, and the co-founder and CEO of DC3 Music Group and The City Drive Entertainment Group, both production and distribution companies specializing in 3D films, music videos, documentaries and live DVDs. The companies have produced projects for a range of artists including Rage Against the Machine, Alter Bridge, Creed, Mariah Carey, Godsmack, and Chickenfoot. He is the Creator, Director and Producer of the groundbreaking series Landmarks Live.

== Career ==
Catullo is a concert promoter, having promoted more than 300 shows in his career. He was the President and Founder of Cement Shoes Records, a record label featuring such bands as Ill Nino and Revolution Mother. It was launched in 2006 with Peter Koepke, the former president and partner of London Records and Jimmy Rollins of the Philadelphia Phillies. The label closed its doors in 2008. CSR was distributed by Universal/Fontana.

Catullo was a partner in Serenity Recording, a recording studio complex in Hollywood that he co-founded in 2004 with Sully Erna, the lead singer of hard rock band Godsmack. Some Spiral artists include Justin Timberlake, The Black Eyed Peas, Fergie, Godsmack, Terrence Howard, Macy Gray, John Legend, Mel B, Britney Spears and others.

=== Recent projects ===
In December 2012, Catullo produced and released the Sully Erna Box Set, according to the website for the band Godsmack. Also released in 2012 was the Catullo produced Steel Panther release of their first Live DVD British Invasion in Australia in September 2012. The DVD was released worldwide on October 22, 2012. The DVD was filmed at Brixton Academy in London and features a two-hour concert/documentary based on the bands sold-out British tour and is currently the No. 1 selling DVD in Australia

Catullo served as executive producer of the film The Square (2013), a documentary about the Egyptian Revolution of 2011.

In August 2013, Catullo directed the music video for the hard rock band Alter Bridge called "Addicted To Pain". The video was released on September 5, 2013. This was Catullo's second music video for Alter Bridge. He previously directed the video for "Isolation" in 2010. He also directed and produced both concert DVDs for the band's 2009 "Live From Amsterdam" (2009) and Live From Wembley" (2011).

On July 13, 2013, Catullo directed and produced a film of Mariah Carey with the NY Philharmonic in Central Park for MLB All Star Week. Details have not been released on what was filmed or when it will be released.

He produced and directed the livestream pay-per-view concert Kiss New Year's Eve 2020 Goodbye concert that broke 2 Guinness world records- one for the highest flame projection in a music concert and another for the most flame projections launched simultaneously in a music concert. It was produced as part of Catullo's own series Landmarks Live Presents, and was filmed with over 50 4K camera with 360-degree views on a 250-foot stage at The Royal Beach at Atlantis.

== Benefit specials ==
Rockin' the Corps – (2005 live variety special) (Director/Producer) Comedy and music concert at Del Mar Beach, Camp Pendleton for 50,000 Marines returning home from Iraq. Acts included Kiss, Godsmack, Ted Nugent, Destiny's Child, Cedric the Entertainer, Jay Mohr and Louie Anderson.

== Filmography, awards and, recognition ==
- Rush – Rush in Rio (2004-Live Music Special/DVD) (Director) – Won two Telly Awards and the Juno Award for "Music DVD of the year". Grammy nomination for "Best Rock Instrumental".
- Matchbox Twenty – Show- a Night in the Life of Matchbox Twenty (2004-Live Music Special/DVD) (Producer) – Won two Telly Awards for "Best TV or Cable Program/ Music Video" and Best TV or Cable Program/ Music Video" and a Golden Eagle Cine Award.
- Boz Scaggs – Greatest Hits Live (2004-Live Music Special/DVD) (Executive Producer) – Golden Eagle Cine Award and 2005 Demmy Award nominee.
- Catullo was awarded a Guinness World record in 2009 for the most cameras used in a live concert recording. A record 239 cameras were used to record Creed's 'Full Circle' tour.
- In 2020, Catullo won an Emmy award for Best Documentary Cultural/Topical for directing, writing and producing the film Breathe Nolan Breathe. The film also won the IndieFEST Film Award of Excellence and was named Best Film of the 2020 Feedback Documentary Film Festival.

== Partial filmography ==
- Guns N' Roses Chinese Democracy Tour Live in 3D (2010) (Director/ Producer)
- Usher Evolution 8701: Live in Concert (2002-TV Special) (Executive Producer)
- Nickelback: Live from Sturgis (2007-Live Music Special/DVD) (Director)
- The Smashing Pumpkins: If All Goes Wrong (2008-Live Music Special) (Producer)
- Alter Bridge: Live from Amsterdam (2009-Live DVD) (Director)
- Creed: Creed Live (2009-Live DVD) (Director/Producer)
- Chickenfoot: Get Your Buzz on Live (2009– Live DVD) (Director/Producer)
- The Black Eyed Peas: Live From The DNC (2008– Documentary/ TV Special) (Director/Producer)
- Godsmack: Changes (2004– Live Music Special/DVD) (Director/ Producer)
- Matchbox Twenty: Show A Night in the Life Of (2004– Live Music Special/ DVD) (Producer)
- Etta James: Burnin Down The House (2001– Live Music Special/DVD) (Director/Producer)
- Marilyn Manson: Guns, God & Government World Tour (2002– Live Music Special/DVD) (Producer)
- The Cult: Music Without Fear (2001– Live Music Special/DVD) (Producer)
- Dave Matthews Band: The Central Park Concert (2003– Live Music Special/DVD) (Producer)
- Steve Miller Band: Live From Chicago (2007– Live Music Special/DVD) (Director/Producer)
- U2: In 3D- Live Concert Film (Special Thanks)
- Breathe, Nolan, Breathe- Winner of 2020 Emmy for Best Documentary Cultural/Topical.
- Katy Perry: The Lifetimes Tour – Live from Paris (2026) (Producer)

== Businesses ==
- Founder & CEO of DC3 Music Group
- Founder & Former President of Coming Home Studios, a music DVD production house.
- Founder & Partner of Cement Shoes Records, a record label, founded in 2005 with Jimmy Rollins & Peter Koepke (former President of London Records).
- Founder & CEO of The City Drive Entertainment Group, Inc.

== Philanthropy ==
Catullo is active in working with charities including The Wheelchair Foundation, The Thalians and various children's charities. He is the entertainment chairperson for the Wheelchair Foundation. After the 2010 Haiti earthquake, Catullo organized a relief mission to Haiti and in 7 days raised over $1 million in medical supplies and wheelchairs and a donated jet. Catullo's company DC3 is listed as a sponsor of the Global Adolescent Project, a non-profit that was formed shortly after the Plane to Haiti trip. Catullo also sits on its board of directors.
