= Kristopher Pooley =

American rock musician from Detroit (born 1976)

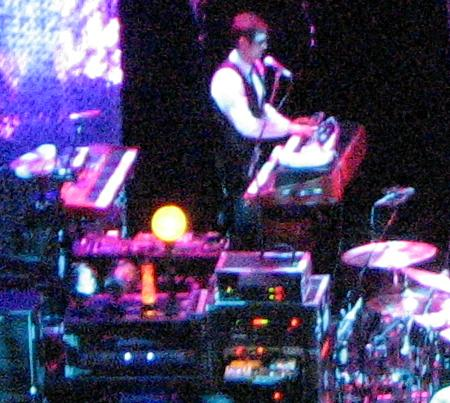
- Khristopher Pooley (2008)

Background information
- Born: October 30, 1976 (age 49)
- Origin: Waterford, Michigan
- Genres: Rock; pop
- Occupations: Musical director, composer, keyboardist
- Instruments: Piano, keyboards, drums, guitar
- Years active: 1992–present
- Website: www.pooleymusic.com

Kristopher Michael Pooley (born October 30, 1976) is an American rock musician from Detroit. He toured with Gwen Stefani as her keyboardist, programmer, and musical director. He is also the music director for Katy Perry, Kesha, Demi Lovato, Adam Lambert, Børns, Rita Ora and has toured with Jane's Addiction, Kenna, Justincase, Liz Phair, Siouxsie Sioux, Nick Lachey, The Vandals, Smashing Pumpkins, Morrissey, and Melissa Etheridge. Also a TV music producer, he has produced music for Glee, The American Bible Challenge, American Horror Story, The Glee Project, and The New Normal. On February 1, 2015, he was the music director for Super Bowl XLIX halftime featuring Katy Perry.

He married Smashing Pumpkins bassist Ginger Reyes in Los Angeles on June 22, 2008. He played with the Smashing Pumpkins during their fall 2008 tour including their performance on Jimmy Kimmel Live! and the Scream Awards on Spike TV/G4.

It was announced in January 2018 that Kris Pooley would be the new music director for American Idol on ABC. He has maintained that role since the sixteenth season.
