= Yamaha SA2200 =

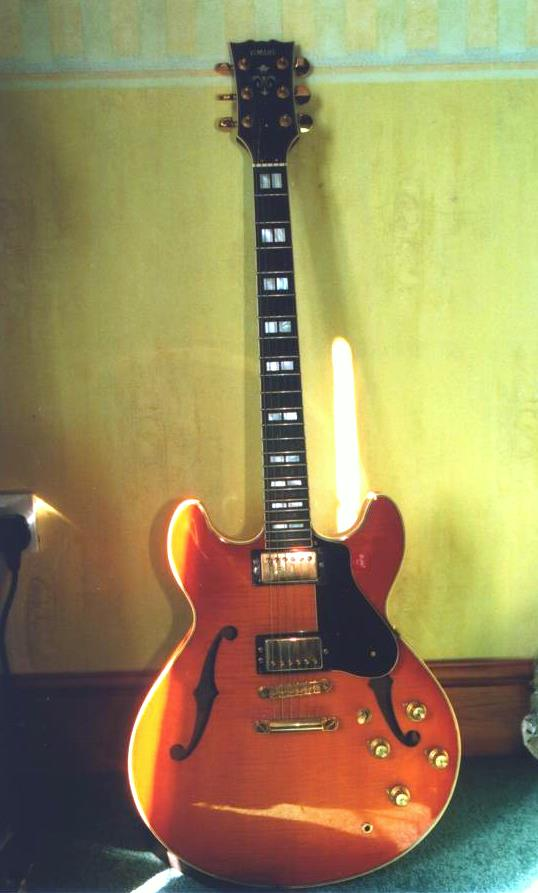
- Manufacturer: Yamaha

Construction
- Body type: thinline semi-solid
- Neck joint: Set
- Scale: 24.73 in (628 mm)

Woods
- Body: laminated maple top, back and sides, solid maple center block
- Neck: one piece mahogany
- Fretboard: single bound 22-fret ebony

Hardware
- Bridge: gotoh nashville style tune-o-matic, gold plated
- Pickup: twin alnico humbuckers with gold plated covers

Colors available
- brown sunburst, violin sunburst

The Yamaha SA2200 is a Japanese made semi-hollowbody electric guitar model that replicates Gibson's ES-335 classic save for the popular Far Eastern variation of thinner horns. The detailing more closely resembles the more upmarket ES-347 with gold-plated hardware, split block inlaid ebony fretboard and multi-bound body and headstock detailing.

The headstock angle is slightly flatter than the classic 17-degree angle used by Gibson, with Yamaha choosing to retain the volute to help strengthen the area behind the nut. The finger board uses medium gauge (2.54mm x 1.2mm) frets, which unlike the Gibson, extend over the single edge binding.

== Pickups ==
The standard Gibson-style wiring is augmented by Yamaha's push-push tone pot switches which knock out the outer coils of each Alnico V humbucker allowing for combinations of humbucking to single-coil use. The coil-taps produce a Strat-style mix with both pickups on, while the neck single-coil alone provides a thinner, more acoustic like version of the plummy humbucker mode.

== Notable SA2200 Users ==
- Miles Okazaki
- John Scofield
- Torsten de Winkel
