= Lisa Harriton =

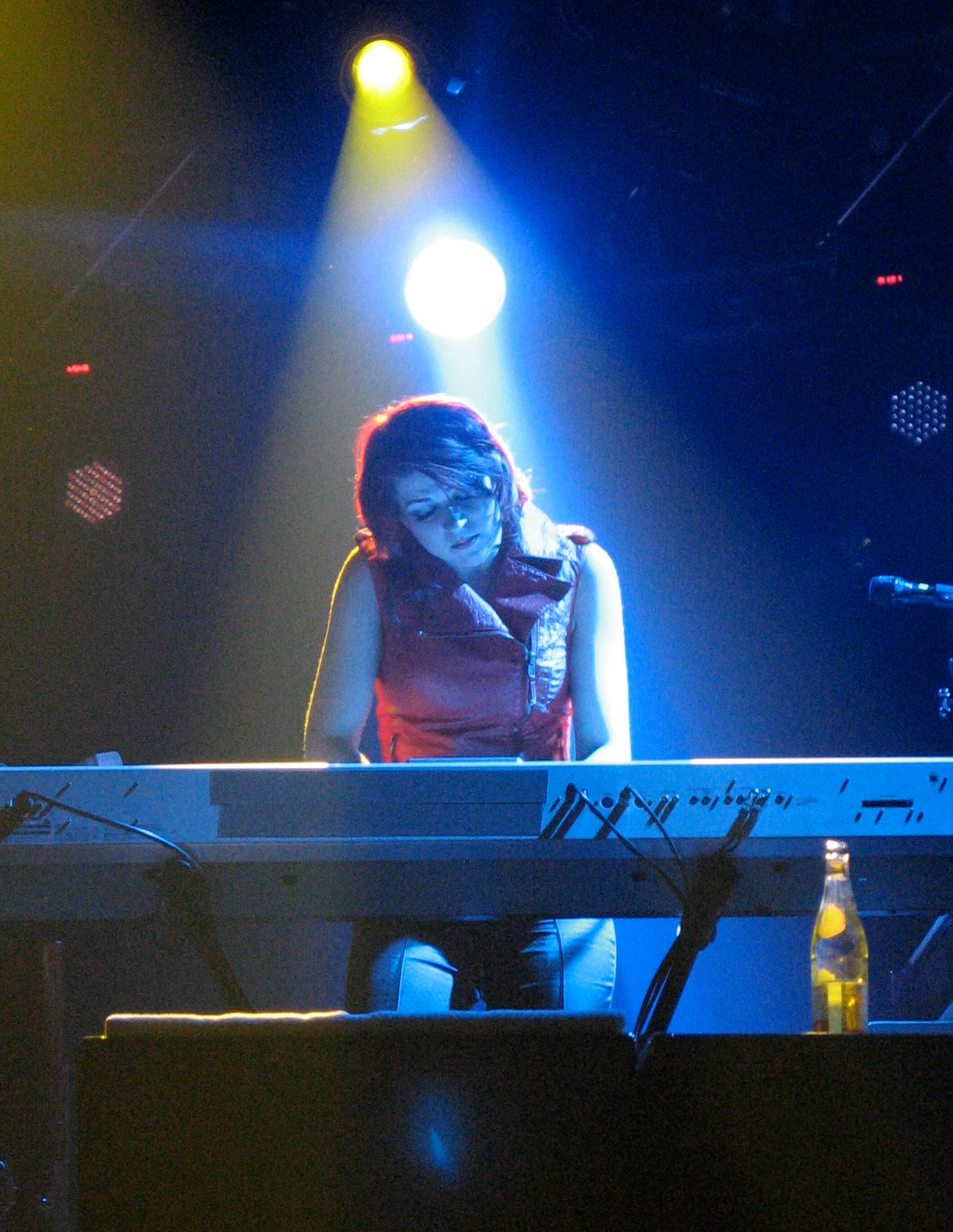

Background information
- Born: Lisa Rae Harriton; Los Angeles
- Genres: Pop, Electronic, rock
- Occupations: Singer-songwriter, pianist, educator
- Instruments: Piano, keyboards, vocals
- Website: www.lisaharriton.com

Lisa Rae Harriton is an American singer-songwriter, keyboardist and sound designer. She writes and records music with her husband Joshua Bartholomew under the moniker JoLi. Harriton is a co-writer of the Grammy and Oscar nominated song "Everything Is Awesome" from The Lego Movie. She teaches Keyboard Performance at the Los Angeles College of Music.

== Early life and education ==
Harriton was born in Los Angeles, California and grew up in Van Nuys, California. She began working as a studio singer at age 8 on dates for Disney, Integrity Media and Word Records. She sang the preproduction duet vocals on Rod Stewart's Great American Songbook.

Harriton attended California State University, Northridge, and completed classical piano studies at the Royal Schools of Music in London, and completed further jazz piano studies at the University of Southern California.

== Music career ==
Harriton has performed in China when she was 16 years old as part of the Cal State Northridge Jazz Band. She has also toured Japan, Peru and Los Angeles jazz clubs and has worked with musicians such as Ingrid Jensen and Ernie Watts.

On May 22, 2007, in Le Grand Rex club in Paris, she was unveiled as touring keyboardist and backing vocalist for the reformed alternative rock band, Smashing Pumpkins. Harriton appeared in the videos for "Tarantula" and "That's the Way (My Love Is)". She also appeared in the documentary concert film "If All Goes Wrong."

In 2009 she toured with Adam Lambert performing as his keyboardist. She also appeared with Lambert on the CBS Early Show, Late Night with David Letterman, The View, and the American Music Awards. In 2010 she performed keyboard duties for Kesha including an appearance on Ellen.

In 2012, Harriton launched a solo career under the stage name Elle Rae.

== Awards and nominations ==
=== "Everything Is Awesome" awards and nominations ===
- Nominated for Best Original Song at the 87th Academy Awards
- Nominated for a Grammy Award for Best Song Written for Visual Media
- Nominated for a Critics' Choice Movie Award for Best Song
- Nominated for a 2014 Georgia Film Critics Association for Best Original Song
- Nominated for a Satellite Award for Best Original Song
- Nominated for an Awards Circuit Community Award Best Original Song
- 2014 Denver Film Critics Society for Best Original Song
- 2014 Hollywood Music in Media Award for Song – Animated Film
- 2014 Houston Film Critics Society for Best Original Song
- 2014 Iowa Film Critics for Best Original Song
- 2014 Phoenix Film Critics Society Awards for Best Original Song
- 2015 Talk Film Society Awards for Best Original Song
- Variety Artisans Award
