= Ginger Pooley =

American rock musician (born 1977)

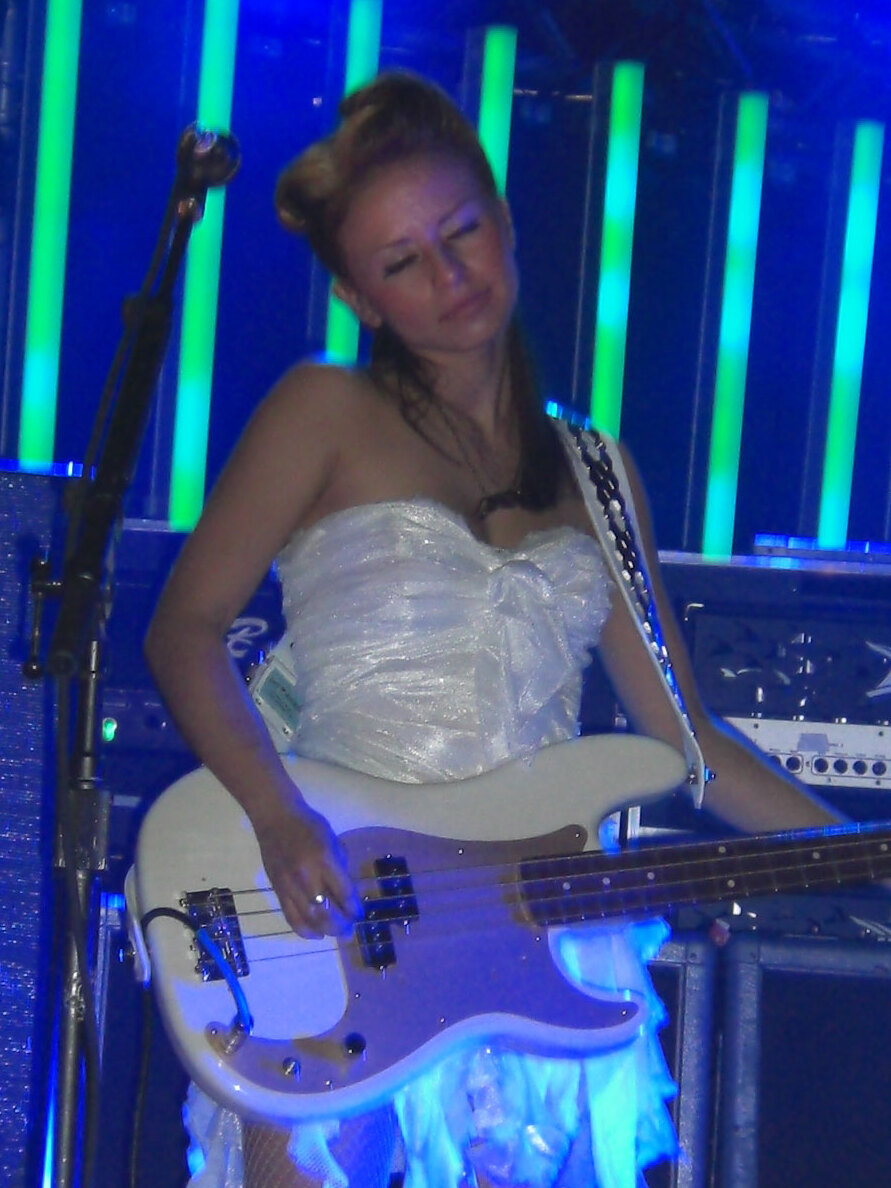
- Pooley performing with The Smashing Pumpkins in 2007

Background information
- Also known as: Ginger Sling
- Born: Ginger Reyes; April 22, 1977 (age 49); Chicago, Illinois, U.S.
- Genres: Indie pop, pop-punk, alternative rock
- Occupation: Musician
- Instruments: Bass, guitar, vocals
- Years active: 1998–present
- Label: Pineapple Heart

Ginger A. Pooley (née Reyes, born April 22, 1977) is an American musician. She was the bassist and backing vocalist for the alternative rock band The Smashing Pumpkins from 2007 to 2010. She has played bass for Gwen Stefani, Lea Michele and Garbage, and was part of the female punk band the Halo Friendlies. Reyes has released solo music under the name Ginger Sling.

== Early life and education ==
Reyes was born in Chicago, Illinois, of Peruvian ancestry. She has had a long musical career, playing in bands and writing songs since her freshman year in high school. Her first band was the Israelites, a Christian ska band from La Crescenta, California. She later replaced Cheryl Hecht as the bassist for the all girl pop-punk band the Halo Friendlies. She attended UCLA from 1998 to 2000 and has a degree in history.

== Career ==
Ginger played bass for the band Lo-Ball during the 2001 Warped Tour. The 2004 music video for her song "Faith" was directed by Djay Brawner. In 2004 she released her "Room EP" on Pineapple Heart Records, and in 2005, another EP entitled "Laguna Beach Demos" on the same label.

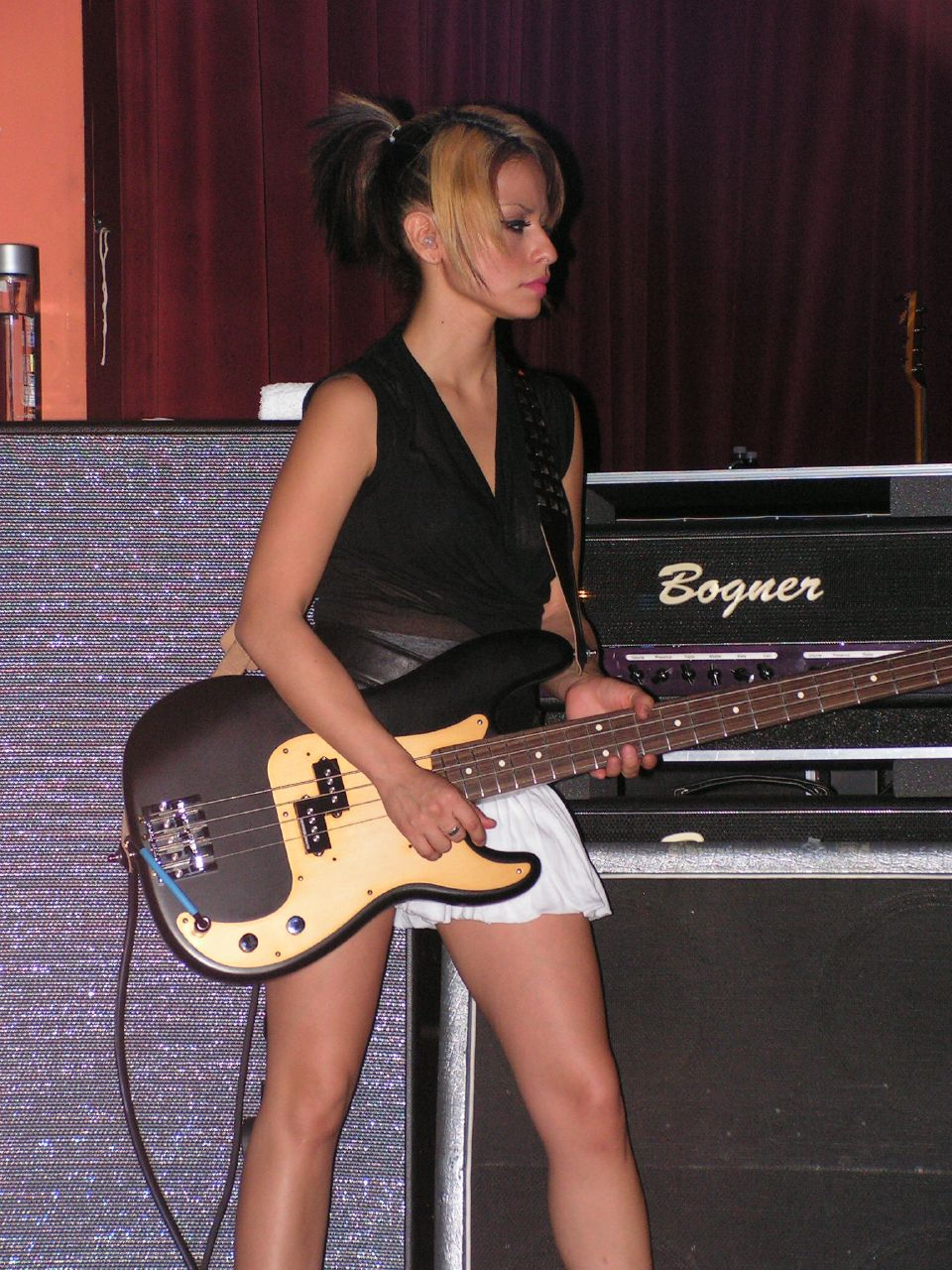
Pooley onstage

On April 6, 2007, rock rumor website Buddyhead reported that Ginger Reyes was the new bassist for The Smashing Pumpkins, replacing former bassists D'arcy Wretzky and Melissa Auf der Maur, in the new line-up.

Reyes has taken part in three Smashing Pumpkins music videos: "Tarantula", "That's the Way (My Love Is)" and "G.L.O.W."

In March 2010, Pooley left The Smashing Pumpkins to focus on her family, stating:

With sorrow and yet with much thankfulness for the opportunity to have played in the Pumpkins, I am sad to say that I can no longer tour with the Pumpkins. Although I've been blessed beyond belief over the past few years through playing with the Pumpkins, my priority now is to keep our little family unit together, which includes my husband and my baby.

Pooley made a guest appearance during the Smashing Pumpkins' Record Store Day performance on April 17, 2010, in Hollywood, CA. She played bass during the rendition of "Bullet with Butterfly Wings". She also played bass for Glee Live in 2010 and 2011 and is working on a solo EP.

In April 2024, Pooley was announced as new touring bassist for Garbage.

== Personal life ==
During The Smashing Pumpkins' concert on February 16, 2008, at the O2 Arena in London, Billy Corgan announced that Reyes had recently become engaged. She married Kristopher Pooley June 22, 2008, in Los Angeles. Pooley is a professional musician who toured as Gwen Stefani's keyboardist and joined the Smashing Pumpkins on their 2008 20th Anniversary tour.

On April 6, 2009, it was announced on The Smashing Pumpkins' official website that Pooley and her husband Kris were expecting their first child later that year. It was announced via Twitter that on October 17, 2009, she gave birth to a baby girl, Talula Victoria Pooley.

Preceded by Melissa Auf der Maur	The Smashing Pumpkins bassist 2007–2010	Succeeded by Nicole Fiorentino
