= G.L.O.W. (song) =

Single by The Smashing Pumpkins
- B-side: "Superchrist"
- Released: November 4, 2008
- Recorded: May – July 2008
- Genre: Alternative rock
- Length: 3:20
- Songwriter: Billy Corgan
- Producers: Billy Corgan; Jimmy Chamberlin; Bjorn Thorsrud

The Smashing Pumpkins singles chronology
| "That's the Way (My Love Is)" (2007) | "G.L.O.W." (2008) | "Freak" (2010) |

Alternative Version Cover
- Promotional CD single cover

Music video
- "G.L.O.W." on YouTube

"G.L.O.W." is a song by the American alternative rock band the Smashing Pumpkins. It premiered on Chicago alternative rock station Q101 on September 29, 2008. This song was the last recorded Smashing Pumpkins song to feature drummer Jimmy Chamberlin, who left the band in March 2009, and before he rejoined in 2018.

== Background ==
In July 2008 it was announced on the band's official website that the recording of this song was complete. Bjorn Thorsrud was confirmed as a co-producer of the track, stating: "'G.L.O.W.' has me glowing all over". Later that month the band's website reported that the track had entered the mixing stage, with mixing by Chris Lord-Alge, and that it was still slated for a September release. The article also featured a photo of Billy Corgan and Jimmy Chamberlin among others at Ardent Studios in Memphis, Tennessee where "G.L.O.W." was recorded.

In an interview with the Los Angeles Times, Billy Corgan stated that, with American Gothic and "G.L.O.W.", the band "finally turned the corner... where it’s starting to feel like our music again, and not theirs, whoever 'they' might be," referring to the band's choice to continue making music without a record label.

"G.L.O.W." was released as a "digital 45" on the iTunes Store on November 4, 2008 and was released as a downloadable track for Guitar Hero World Tour on December 4, 2008, along with "1979" and "The Everlasting Gaze". It was the first digital 45 to be released by iTunes. The band worked on a music video with Justin Coloma for the song. The video premiered on MySpace on December 2, 2008.

The cover art was created by artist Kateri Forbes.

== Track listing ==
Digital 45

1. "G.L.O.W." – 3:20
2. "Superchrist" – 7:05

Guitar Hero download package

1. "G.L.O.W." – 3:20
2. "1979" – 4:24
3. "The Everlasting Gaze" – 4:01

== Chart positions ==
| Chart (2008) | Peak Position |
|---|---|
| US Bubbling Under Hot 100 (Billboard) | 8 |
| US Alternative Airplay (Billboard) | 11 |
| US Mainstream Rock (Billboard) | 25 |
| Canada Hot 100 (Billboard) | 80 |
