= Tarantula (The Smashing Pumpkins song) =

Song by the Smashing Pumpkins

Single by the Smashing Pumpkins

from the album Zeitgeist
- B-side: "Death from Above"; "Zeitgeist"
- Released: May 21, 2007
- Recorded: 2007
- Genre: Garage rock; stoner rock
- Length: 3:51
- Label: Reprise
- Songwriter: Billy Corgan
- Producers: Billy Corgan and Jimmy Chamberlin

The Smashing Pumpkins singles chronology
| "Untitled" (2001) | "Tarantula" (2007) | "That's the Way (My Love Is)" (2007) |

Alternative cover
- iTunes release

"Tarantula" is a song by the Smashing Pumpkins. It is the first single from their seventh album, Zeitgeist, and their first release since their 2006 reunion.

== Release and structure ==
Billy Corgan mentioned during a concert of June 5 in Berlin that "Tarantula" was titled in honor of the German rock band Scorpions, with whom Corgan had recently collaborated on the Scorpions song "The Cross". The intro and the outro of the song are inspired by the song "Dark Lady" of Scorpions, while Corgan stated that he wrote the solo of the song thinking how Uli Jon Roth could have played it. Corgan and Chamberlin believe the song is a culmination of music they've been listening to all their lives, specifically the Scorpions and UFO.

"Tarantula"

A 30-second clip of the song was released on May 14, 2007. On May 21, 2007, the single was released on iTunes for the United States, followed by the United Kingdom and Canada on May 22. On this date, "Tarantula" was played for the first time live in Paris at the Pumpkins' first show in seven years. The song was also played on the Late Show with David Letterman on July 9, 2007.

On July 2, a single was released on CD and 7-inch in the UK, both containing the B-side "Death from Above". Both covers have a black-and-white photo of Paris Hilton holding a BlackBerry with the Zeitgeist album cover on the screen, and a low-resolution image of a mushroom cloud in the background. A separate 7-inch was released in a clear plastic sleeve on white vinyl. Hilton talked to Stereogum about the cover art, saying: "Billy [Corgan] and I were friends, and he called me one day and was like, 'I want to do this photo shoot with you and Lindsay Lohan and Britney Spears. I have this whole idea; will you come and meet me?' [Editor's note: Spears and Lohan didn't end up making it to the shoot.]We went to some studio or something, and we shot it together. It was really awesome. I love him. He's so talented and such a nice person. It was just so cool to be on an album cover for one of my favorite bands growing up."

On July 15, "Tarantula" entered the UK Rock Singles Chart at number one.

== Critical reception ==
Upon release, "Tarantula" received mixed reviews. Drowned in Sound commented that Corgan's vocals "are trying too hard to sound like Pumpkins vocals, clumsily washed in reverb" and "is too much like a cobbled together montage of Smashing Pumpkins sounds to be exciting."

Alana King of website Roomthirteen called "Tarantula" a "promising track and is proof that the Smashing Pumpkins are as strong and resilient as ever." Rob Taylor of website Clickmusic.com called the single "a slick and professional effort worthy of anyone's ear."

== Music video ==
The music video debuted on July 2, 2007 on Spinner.com. It features the band (dressed primarily in the white outfits of the 2007 tour) playing with multiple extra people, in front of a psychedelic visual collage, and is partially shot in 3D. The video was directed by P.R. Brown.

In July 2007, it was announced via the Smashing Pumpkins' official website that the green screen files for the video would be released online. Fans with video editing skills will be allowed to make their own version of the Tarantula video and enter it into a contest via the website.

Two winners were announced in August 2007. 1st place was awarded to Levi Ahmu and 2nd place was awarded to Mason Williams. Both videos consisted of vast amounts of visual effects. Honorable mention was made for Ryan Webber for his live action take on the music video.

== Formats and track listing ==
1. "Tarantula" – 3:51
2. "Death from Above" – 4:06
3. "Zeitgeist" – 2:49 (Dutch CD single bonus track)

== Charts ==
=== Weekly charts ===
Weekly chart performance for "Tarantula"
| Chart (2007) | Peak position |
|---|---|
| Australia Digital Tracks (ARIA) | 46 |
| Belgium (Ultratop 50 Flanders) | 50 |
| Belgium (Ultratip Bubbling Under Wallonia) | 14 |
| Canada Hot 100 (Billboard) | 30 |
| Canada Rock (Billboard) | 8 |
| Denmark (Tracklisten) | 14 |
| Ireland (IRMA) | 44 |
| Scotland Singles (Official Charts) | 11 |
| UK Singles (Official Charts) | 59 |
| UK Rock & Metal (Official Charts) | 1 |
| US Billboard Hot 100 | 54 |
| US Alternative Airplay (Billboard) | 2 |
| US Mainstream Rock (Billboard) | 6 |
| US Pop 100 (Billboard) | 50 |

=== Year-end charts ===
Year-end chart performance for "Tarantula"
| Chart (2007) | Position |
|---|---|
| US Alternative Songs (Billboard) | 20 |
| US Mainstream Rock Songs (Billboard) | 33 |
