= That's the Way (My Love Is) =

Single by The Smashing Pumpkins

from the album Zeitgeist
- B-side: "Stellar"; "Daydream"
- Released: September 10, 2007
- Recorded: 2007
- Genre: Alternative rock
- Length: 3:44
- Label: Reprise
- Songwriter(s): Billy Corgan
- Producer(s): Billy Corgan, Jimmy Chamberlin, Terry Date

The Smashing Pumpkins singles chronology
"Tarantula" (2007)	"That's the Way (My Love Is)" (2007)	"G.L.O.W." (2008)

"That's the Way (My Love Is)" is a song written by Billy Corgan and performed by The Smashing Pumpkins on their album Zeitgeist.

"That's the Way (My Love Is)" is the second, and final, commercial single from the album, and was released to radio in August 2007, with a retail single in September. The song was played live on the Late Show with David Letterman on July 13, 2007.

Billy Corgan commented that the song initially sounded like an outtake from 1995's Mellon Collie and the Infinite Sadness, but it was slowed down and given a different drum beat in the course of recording the song.

Some of the formats of the physical single release contain a live solo performance of "Daydream" recorded on June 5, 2007 in Berlin, Germany, with Corgan on vocals and guitar.

== Critical reception ==
Upon release, the single received mixed reviews. Drowned in Sound notes that while it is "a far better single than lead effort 'Tarantula'", "That's the Way (My Love Is)" is respectable enough until it's compared to the Pumpkins’ back catalogue—and then it comes off sounding like album-filler." James Thomson of website AllGigs said the single "is a long way from the bands' best efforts." Jo Vallance of website Roomthirteen called it "a rather weak echo of the Pumpkins' former splendour" and that the single "seems to have no drive or motivation."

John Murphy of website OMH Music gave it a positive review, commenting that "while Zeitgeist was admittedly rather disappointing, it did have a fair few killer songs, of which this is one of the best."

Reception in recent years has greatly improved with Spin ranking 18 out of all 315 Smashing Pumpkins songs released.

== Music video ==
It is set in a dull, gray, futuristic world. Most of the video is set up on a loose plot of Corgan trying to follow a woman (played by actress Ve Sidra Magni). The video then cuts to the band performing on a platform, still in the futuristic world, while images of the band (and a brief apparition of Paris Hilton) float around on screens.

== Track listing ==
All songs were written by Billy Corgan.

UK CD single

1. "That's the Way (My Love Is)" – 3:48
2. "Stellar" – 6:27
3. "Daydream" (Live)" – 2:54

7" vinyl and US CD single

1. "That's the Way (My Love Is)" – 3:48
2. "Daydream" (Live)" – 2:54

== Charts ==
Chart (2007)	Peak position
US Alternative Airplay (Billboard)	23
US Mainstream Rock (Billboard)	32
UK Singles (OCC)	94
