= Shiny and Oh So Bright Tour =

2018 concert tour by the Smashing Pumpkins

- Concert by The Smashing Pumpkins
- Poster to the concert in London, Canada
- Location: Europe; North America
- Associated album: Shiny and Oh So Bright, Vol. 1 / LP: No Past. No Future. No Sun.
- Start date: July 12, 2018
- End date: October 18, 2018
- Legs: 2
- No. of shows: 42

The Smashing Pumpkins concert chronology
- In Plainsong (2016); Shiny and Oh So Bright Tour (2018); 30th Anniversary Series (2018)

The Shiny and Oh So Bright Tour was the Smashing Pumpkins' headlining reunion tour after Jimmy Chamberlin and James Iha formally rejoined the band in early 2018. Prior to the tour, there were some notable exchanges from frontman Billy Corgan and founding bassist D'arcy Wretzky over her absence from the reunited band. The tour was noted also for having a three-hour setlist with material solely from the band's first five albums, except for four covers and the 2018 single "Solara".

== Background ==
For many years after the band's initial breakup, they had toured with a litany of members, including Chamberlin himself when the band first reformed in 2006, although he quickly departed by early 2009. In 2015 he made a return to the band as a touring member for The End Times Tour with Marilyn Manson and 2016's In Plainsong tour, which was “acoustic-electro” and saw the band reach into their catalog of rarities alongside some hits. James Iha made a few surprise returns on this tour as well, marking the first time he had shared a stage with Corgan since December 2, 2000. On February 15, 2018, the band announced both Chamberlin and Iha would return on a full-member basis, alongside now longtime member Jeff Schroeder, making the band's first ever lineup with three permanent guitarists.

This tour would be the band's first arena trek since the Oceania tour, which itself was a mixture of arenas and theaters. Before the tour kicked off its arena stops across the United States, Canada, the United Kingdom, and Italy, two warmup shows were played at The Troubadour in Los Angeles, which saw AFI's Davey Havok make a guest appearance to perform the Joy Division song "Transmission", and a small backyard house show where the band had filmed the "1979" music video years earlier.

== Reception ==
Reviews of the tour were mixed, but leaned towards positive more often. Many praised the tour for how much ground the setlist covered throughout the performance. Others pointed out the tour's focus on fans' nostalgia, and that the tour performed every hit song along with several rarities and cover songs. The band's performance of Led Zeppelin's renowned song "Stairway to Heaven" also garnered lots of attention for being authentic to the original. Some complaints raised by some who reviewed the tour included the extensive length that the band performed, as they had a set spanning three and a quarter hours, and others pointed out the lack of any material from the band's catalog after Machina/The Machines of God.

== Set list ==
Typical set list during the tour.

1. "Mellon Collie and The Infinite Sadness"
2. "Disarm"
3. "Rocket"
4. "Siva"
5. "Rhinoceros"
6. "Space Oddity" (David Bowie cover)
7. "Drown"
8. "Zero" (Preceded by Zero Speech Interlude video and jam intro)
9. "The Everlasting Gaze"
10. "Stand Inside Your Love"
11. "Thirty-Three"
12. "Eye"
13. "Soma"
14. "Blew Away" (Preceded by Mark McGrath Vaudeville Interlude 1 video)
15. "For Martha"
16. "To Sheila"
17. "Mayonaise"
18. "Porcelina of the Vast Oceans"
19. "Landslide" (Fleetwood Mac cover)
20. "Tonight, Tonight"
21. "Stairway to Heaven" (Led Zeppelin cover)
22. "Cherub Rock"
23. "1979" (Preceded by Mark McGrath Vaudeville Interlude 2 video and radio intro)
24. "Ava Adore"
25. "Try, Try, Try"
26. "The Beginning Is The End Is The Beginning"
27. "Hummer"
28. "Today"
29. "Bullet With Butterfly Wings"
30. "Muzzle"

Encore

31. "Solara"
32. "Baby Mine" (Betty Noyes cover)

=== Notes ===
- On the two European shows in October 2018, the band performed "Silvery Sometimes (Ghosts)" in the encore instead of "Solara."
- Also on the two European shows, the band performed "Landslide" with Amalie Bruun from their opening band Myrkur.

== Tour dates ==
List of 2018 concerts
Date	City	Country	Venue	Opening act
July 12, 2018	Glendale	United States	Gila River Arena	Metric
July 14, 2018	Oklahoma City	United States	Chesapeake Energy Arena	Metric
July 16, 2018	Austin	United States	Frank Erwin Center	Metric
July 17, 2018	Houston	United States	Toyota Center	Metric
July 18, 2018	Dallas	United States	American Airlines Center	Metric
July 20, 2018	Nashville	United States	Bridgestone Arena	Metric
July 21, 2018	Louisville	United States	KFC Yum! Center	Metric
July 22, 2018	Duluth	United States	Infinite Energy Arena	Metric
July 24, 2018	Miami	United States	American Airlines Arena	Metric
July 25, 2018	Tampa	United States	Amalie Arena	Metric
July 27, 2018	Baltimore	United States	Royal Farms Arena	Metric
July 28, 2018	Philadelphia	United States	Wells Fargo Center	Metric
July 29, 2018	Uncasville	United States	Mohegan Sun Arena	Metric
July 31, 2018	Boston	United States	TD Garden	Metric
August 1, 2018	New York City	United States	Madison Square Garden	Metric
August 4, 2018	Pittsburgh	United States	PPG Paints Arena	Metric
August 5, 2018	Detroit	United States	Little Caesars Arena	Metric
August 7, 2018	Montreal	Canada	Bell Centre	Metric
August 8, 2018	Toronto	Canada	Scotiabank Arena	Metric
August 9, 2018	London	Canada	Budweiser Gardens	Metric
August 11, 2018	Columbus	United States	Schottenstein Center	Metric
August 13, 2018	Chicago	United States	United Center	Metric
August 14, 2018	Chicago	United States	United Center	Metric
August 16, 2018	Kansas City	United States	Sprint Center	Metric
August 17, 2018	Indianapolis	United States	Bankers Life Fieldhouse	Metric
August 19, 2018	Saint Paul	United States	Xcel Energy Center	Metric
August 20, 2018	Omaha	United States	CenturyLink Center	Metric
August 21, 2018	Sioux Falls	United States	Denny Sanford Premier Center	Metric
August 24, 2018	Seattle	United States	KeyArena	Metric
August 25, 2018	Portland	United States	Moda Center	Metric
August 27, 2018	Oakland	United States	Oracle Arena	Metric
August 28, 2018	Sacramento	United States	Golden 1 Center	Metric
August 30, 2018	Inglewood	United States	The Forum	Metric
August 31, 2018	Inglewood	United States	The Forum	Metric
September 1, 2018	San Diego	United States	Viejas Arena	Metric
September 2, 2018	Las Vegas	United States	T-Mobile Arena	Metric
September 4, 2018	Salt Lake City	United States	Vivint Smart Home Arena	Metric
September 5, 2018	Denver	United States	Pepsi Center	Metric
September 8, 2018	Calgary	Canada	Scotiabank Saddledome	—N/a
September 9, 2018	Edmonton	Canada	Rogers Place	—N/a
October 16, 2018	London	England	The SSE Arena, Wembley	Myrkur
October 18, 2018	Casalecchio di Reno	Italy	Unipol Arena	Myrkur

=== Cancelled dates ===
List of cancelled concerts, showing date, city, country, venue and reason for cancellation
Date	City	Country	Venue	Reason
September 7, 2018	Nampa	United States	Ford Idaho Center	Alleged low ticket sales

== Personnel ==
- Billy Corgan - lead vocals, guitar, piano on "For Martha," "To Sheila," and "Stairway to Heaven"
- James Iha - backing vocals, guitar, lead vocals on "Blew Away"
- Jimmy Chamberlin - drums, ukulele on "Baby Mine"
- Jeff Schroeder - guitar
- Katie Cole - backing vocals, keyboards, guitar
- Jack Bates - bass
