= Machina: Aranea Alba Editio =

Box set by the Smashing Pumpkins
- Released: October 2025
- Length: 5:17:56 (combined main and bonus tracks)
- Label: Martha's Music

The Smashing Pumpkins chronology
Aghori Mhori Mei (2024)	Machina: Aranea Alba Editio (2025)

Machina: Aranea Alba Editio is a box set by American alternative rock band the Smashing Pumpkins. It was released as an octuple vinyl box set in October 2025, after some delays in production, via the website of Billy Corgan's Madame Zuzu's tea shop. The box set consists of material from the band's 2000 albums Machina/The Machines of God and Machina II/The Friends & Enemies of Modern Music. The band broke up shortly after the release of the latter record, with Corgan saying he considered the entire Machina project "unfinished".

The set includes a 48 track version of the Machina album, as well as 32 bonus tracks. It includes some rerecorded songs, and all the material has been remixed and remastered. It was promoted by a concert tour of North America, with Corgan forming a new band titled Billy Corgan and the Machines of God. The band included Corgan alongside bassist Kid Tigrrr and drummer Jake Hayden, as well as the Smashing Pumpkins's touring guitarist Kiki Wong.

== Background ==
"Out of all the records I made, [Machina is] the one where it's a coin flip as to whether or not it should've been finished. I don't think it was produced to a point of completion, it's like looking at an unfinished film. But that's the story of the album, me trying to hold something together that had no more organic reason to hold together other than the name above the door. Until I do the reissue, I can't work out what the last component is and exorcise the ghost of the record."

— Billy Corgan commenting on the Machina project.

After the muted response to the Smashing Pumpkins's 1998 album Adore, Billy Corgan decided to end the band following the release of their next studio album. He envisioned Machina as a rock opera concept album spread out over two discs. Original drummer Jimmy Chamberlin returned to the band in early 1999, after he had been fired following a heroin overdose in 1997. Corgan sought to record the two-disc album with all original band members. However, original bassist D'arcy Wretzky quit following a concert tour of club venues in April 1999, the final event to feature all four original members. Wretzky is credited with playing bass on Machina/The Machines of God, although the extent of her contributions remains unclear.

Machina/The Machines of God was released commercially by Virgin Records in February 2000, with sequel Machina II/The Friends & Enemies of Modern Music released independently that September. The band produced 25 vinyl copies of the latter album, with recipients instructed to share it online as a free download. Virgin had refused to release Machina commercially as a double album.

== Re-recording and remixing ==
In 2011, Corgan announced a reissue campaign of all of the Smashing Pumpkins's 1990's albums, with a tentative release date for the Machina reissue scheduled for 2013. He said both Machina albums would be released together "as originally conceived", noting Machina II was "unfinished" at the time of release, and that the reissue would be released on streaming services. Following the 2014 reissue of Adore, Corgan said work had finally begun on the Machina reissue, confirming it would include material from both Machina/The Machines of God and Machina II/The Friends & Enemies of Modern Music.

Corgan said in 2014 that the band were working from the original master tapes and a "host of select live shows", and all the material would be remixed and remastered and released in its "intended double/triple album sequence". He said his intention with the reissue was to present Machina in its entirety "as a theatrical narrative". In order to fully realize the narrative, he said the band could expand upon the original material by using acoustic and alternate takes, "re-contextualized soundtrack pieces", and spoken word pieces to "create an immersive experience." He also said he was "not opposed to asking current artists to participate, singing songs as such on the compositions meant for other character's voices. Finishing what the band started so long ago, and we just didn't have the strength to end."

In 2018, he confirmed the band were re-recording tracks from the Machina albums, specifically noting that Jimmy Chamberlin was re-recording drums for the Machina II track "Whyte Spyder". He said the album would contain songs that were previously unfinished, and that the release would contain new artwork. The band began work on remixing the material in 2020. Corgan said the material was being remixed from a variety of sources, including the original master recordings, DAT mixes, and two tape transfers created in 1999. However, he said the latter would have to be "redone" after the band discovered they were originally created using the discontinued Dolby SR recording format. Corgan also said the band were working from safety tapes – backup copies of the original master tapes – as their label had transferred the originals over five years ago.

Corgan confirmed in 2021 that re-recording and remixing of the reissue was complete, and that it was in the process of being mastered. He said of the leftover tracks: "Some are unfinished, almost like a sketch. But in the aggregate of listening to it, you kinda get a sense of the movie I was after. It's pretty wild. It's almost impossible to put into words." He also confirmed the package would contain an essay explaining the storyline of the work, and that it would contain around 80 songs.

== Release and promotion ==
Remixed and remastered versions of Machina/The Machines of God were released on August 22, 2025, via Universal Music Enterprises. The CD version retains the original 15-song track list, while vinyl editions include the bonus track "Speed Kills", which had been included on the original vinyl edition. The eight vinyl box set, Machina: Aranea Alba Editio, was set to be released on September 5 exclusively via the website of Corgan's Madame Zuzu's tea shop, based in Illinois. However, due to pressing delays, the release was delayed until October 2025. The box set contains 80 songs: a 48-track version of the main album (encompassing tracks from both Machina/The Machines of God and Machina II/The Friends & Enemies of Modern Music), as well as 32 bonus tracks of outtakes, demos, and live performances. Corgan said the vinyl box set is the "only place one can get this expansive, 80-song collection".

To promote the reissue, Corgan embarked on a solo tour with a new band titled Billy Corgan and the Machines of God. The band included Corgan alongside bassist Kid Tigrrr and drummer Jake Hayden, as well as the Smashing Pumpkins' touring guitarist Kiki Wong. Smashing Pumpkins members James Iha and Chamberlin did not take part in the tour, with Corgan saying the three "weren't in agreement about what the purpose of such a thing might be for. And we have this agreement, which has been really helpful over the past seven or eight years, that says if we're not in alignment about something like that, nobody is going to pull rank and say it has to be done."

The tour took place in June, and saw the band performing in smaller venues throughout North America, with sets consisting mostly of material from Machina, 1995's Mellon Collie and the Infinite Sadness, and 2024's Aghori Mhori Mei. Melissa Auf der Maur appeared as the bassist during the tour's Montréal date, where she joined the band for a performance of "The Everlasting Gaze". Auf der Maur had taken over from Wretzky for the Machina tours in 1999 and 2000.

The 5CD version boxset was released in October 2026

== Track listing ==
All tracks are written by Billy Corgan, except where noted.

Aranea Alba Editio LP 1
No.	Title	Length
1.	"Le Deux Machina"	2:22
2.	"Stand Inside Your Love"	4:14
3.	"I of the Mourning"	4:37
4.	"God's Promise"	2:55
5.	"The Crying Tree of Mercury"	3:45
6.	"Slow Dawn"	3:14
7.	"The Sacred and Profane"	4:19
8.	"The Everlasting Gaze"	4:04
9.	"Here's to the Atom Bomb"	4:25
10.	"Wound"	3:57
Total length:		37:57

Aranea Alba Editio LP 2
No.	Title	Length
11.	"Glass' Theme"	1:54
12.	"Heavy Metal Machine"	5:55
13.	"Blue Skies Wrought Tears"	3:29
14.	"Pale Scales"	2:18
15.	"Vanity"	4:09
16.	"Autumn"	2:00
17.	"Machina, Machina"	2:52
18.	"Raindrops + Sunshowers"	5:34
19.	"Glass and the Ghost Children"	9:45
Total length:		38:02

Aranea Alba Editio LP 3
No.	Title	Length
20.	"Real Love"	4:07
21.	"The Imploding Voice"	4:30
22.	"One Moment"	3:04
23.	"Speed Kills"	5:09
24.	"Here's to the Atom Bomb, Too"	4:44
25.	"Try, Try, Try"	5:13
26.	"Whyte Spyder"	3:43
27.	"Don't Wanna Be Your Lover"	2:48
28.	"Cash Car Star"	3:19
Total length:		36:47

Aranea Alba Editio LP 4
No.	Title	Length
29.	"Dross"	3:30
30.	"Lucky 13"	3:04
31.	"HMM"	6:13
32.	"Without You"	3:38
33.	"Winterlong"	4:59
34.	"Laugh"	2:49
35.	"If There Is a God"	4:51
36.	"This Time"	4:42
37.	"Blue Skies Bring Tears"	6:03
Total length:		40:04

Aranea Alba Editio LP 5
No.	Title	Writer(s)	Length
38.	"In My Body"		6:16
39.	"Innosense"	Corgan; James Iha	2:33
40.	"Try (Again)"		4:16
41.	"Drain"		2:26
42.	"Yet Another Promise"		1:49
43.	"Home"		4:34
44.	"With Every Light"		3:59
45.	"Age of Innocence"		4:02
46.	"Let Me Give the World to You"		4:15
47.	"Soot + Stars"		6:40
48.	"Machina Theme"		2:09
Total length:			43:03 (03:15:54)

Aranea Alba Editio LP 6: Bonus Tracks
No.	Title	Writer(s)	Length
49.	"Untitled"		3:51
50.	"Blue Skies Bring Tears" (Early version)		4:09
51.	"Go" (Machina II version)	Iha	3:47
52.	"Vanity" (Sadlands demo)		4:32
53.	"Raindrops + Sunshowers" (Band demo)		3:33
54.	"Soul Power" (Machina II version)	James Brown	2:58
55.	"Here I Am" (Sadlands demo)		3:27
56.	"The Crying Tree"		3:14
57.	"Glass and the Ghost Children" (Pumpkinland demo)		6:08
58.	"Age of Innocence" (Acoustic demo)		3:49
59.	"Rock On"	David Essex	5:35
60.	"End of the Joke"		3:19
Total length:			39:27

Aranea Alba Editio LP 7: Bonus Tracks
No.	Title	Writer(s)	Length
61.	"Stand Inside Your Love" (Early version)		4:05
62.	"Home" (Home demo)		2:37
63.	"Identify" (Movie demo)	Corgan; Mike Garson	4:38
64.	"Rainy Day Song"	Iha	2:53
65.	"Lucky 13" (Machina II demo)		2:17
66.	"Satur9" (Machina II version)		3:38
67.	"The Imploding Voice" (Pumpkinland demo)		4:44
68.	"Without You" (Sadlands demo)		3:40
69.	"Wound" (Sadlands demo)		3:21
70.	"Speed Kills" (Early version)		4:22
Total length:			39:37

Aranea Alba Editio LP 8: Bonus Tracks
No.	Title	Writer(s)	Length
71.	"Whyte Spyder" (Machina II version)		3:39
72.	"Summer" (Rehearsal)	Iha	3:31
73.	"Let Me Give the World to You" (Sadlands demo)		4:12
74.	"Heavy Metal Machine" (Machina II version)		5:00
75.	"I of the Radio" (Instrumental demo)		3:52
76.	"Sleeping Giant"		3:43
77.	"Attached By Satellites" (Sadlands demo)		3:34
78.	"Glass' Theme" (Machina II demo)		1:59
79.	"Promise" (New York City demo)		3:45
80.	"Fuck You (An Ode to No One)" (Live December 2, 2000)		4:17
Total length:			41:52 (02:02:02)
