= The Smashing Pumpkins – Greatest Hits Video Collection (1991–2000) =

2001 DVD by the Smashing Pumpkins

Video by Smashing Pumpkins
- Released: November 20, 2001
- Genre: Alternative rock
- Length: 123:00
- Language: English
- Label: Virgin
- Producer: Nicola Doring, Eric Ferris, June Guterman, Bart Lipton, Ali Newling, Line Postmyr

Smashing Pumpkins chronology
Machina II/The Friends & Enemies of Modern Music (2000)	The Smashing Pumpkins – Greatest Hits Video Collection (1991–2000) (2001)	Zeitgeist (2007)

Professional ratings
Review scores
Source	Rating
AllMusic	4.5/5 stars
Ultimate Guitar Archive	9/10

The Smashing Pumpkins – Greatest Hits Video Collection (1991–2000) is a DVD containing nearly all of The Smashing Pumpkins music videos released prior to the band's breakup in late 2000. Extras include an exclusive short film Try, a previously unreleased "I Am One" music video, behind-the-scenes and outtakes footage, two live videos, and commentary by Jimmy Chamberlin, Billy Corgan, James Iha, and the video directors.

This DVD was released in 2001 in conjunction with Rotten Apples, a greatest hits compilation CD which also contains many of the same titles. Both the DVD and CD were certified Gold less than a month after their release.

Both the DVD and the CD omit "The End Is the Beginning Is the End" from their track lists because the single and video were licensed to Warner Bros. for use with the Batman & Robin soundtrack. The video can be found as a bonus feature on the special edition version of the Batman & Robin DVD, released in 2005.

The song which accompanies the Gish menu is a studio recording of "Pale Scales". All other menu songs are from either Rotten Apples or its bonus disc, Judas O.

Each video includes audio commentary with the band and director(s) while select videos include full outtakes. The video for "1979" includes bonus commentary titled Lost Tapes Commentary which is about how the master tapes for the original shooting of the video (most of it assumed to be the same as the final video) was lost and the search for the tapes.

The live video for "Geek USA" was recorded at the sound level of the PA system used in the unknown club they performed in. According to captions on the video, you can experience the club sound by putting the volume of your sound system at its maximum.

According to Corgan on the commentary of "Rhinoceros" there are two version of the video (the second one being featured on the DVD). The first version could be considered an outtake of the final version which is filmed in the fashion as the final (using Super 8mm film) as a woman is followed as she walks around a town with footage of live video cut in. The first version was not featured due to being lost until early 2009 when it was discovered while compiling rare music and video which has been unreleased officially or on a bootleg.

The video for "Untitled" may be viewed by highlighting the "extras" button on the main screen and hitting the "left" arrow button on your DVD remote/player.

== Track listing ==
1. "Siva" (Directed by Angela Conway in Chicago, May 1991)
2. "Rhinoceros" (Directed by Angela Conway in London, September 1991)
3. "Cherub Rock" (Directed by Kevin Kerslake in San Francisco, July 1993)
4. "Today" (Directed by Stéphane Sednaoui in Los Angeles, August 1993)
5. "Disarm" (Directed by Jake Scott in Los Angeles, December 1993)
6. "Rocket" (also with an alternate performance cut) (Directed by Jonathan Dayton and Valerie Faris in Sylmar, April 1994)
7. "Bullet with Butterfly Wings" (Directed by Samuel Bayer in Los Angeles, October 1995)
8. "1979" (Directed by Jonathan Dayton and Valerie Faris in Santa Clarita, January 1996)
9. "Zero" (Directed by Yelena Yemchuk in Los Angeles, March 1996)
10. "Tonight, Tonight" (Directed by Jonathan Dayton and Valerie Faris in Los Angeles, March 1996)
11. "Thirty-Three" (Directed by Yelena Yemchuk and Billy Corgan in Los Angeles and New York, October 1996)
12. "Ava Adore" (Directed by Dom and Nic in London, May 1998)
13. "Perfect" (Directed by Jonathan Dayton and Valerie Faris in Los Angeles, July 1998)
14. "The Everlasting Gaze" (Directed by Jonas Åkerlund in London, January 2000)
15. "Stand Inside Your Love" (Directed by W.I.Z. in Santa Clarita, December 1999)
16. "Try, Try, Try" (Directed by Jonas Åkerlund in Stockholm and London, June 2000)
17. "Geek U.S.A." (live) (Directed by Jonathan Dayton and Valerie Faris in Seattle, October 1993)
18. "An Ode to No One" (live at Metro final performance) (Directed by Bart Lipton in Chicago, December 2000)
19. "I Am One" (Directed by Kevin Kerslake in Chicago, January 1992)
20. Try – A short film
21. "Untitled" (Easter egg) (Directed by Bart Lipton in Chicago, November 2000)

== Personnel ==
The Smashing Pumpkins

- Melissa Auf der Maur – bass guitar
- Jimmy Chamberlin – drums
- Billy Corgan – vocals, guitar
- James Iha – guitar, vocals
- D'arcy Wretzky – bass guitar

Directors

- Jonas Åkerlund
- Samuel Bayer
- Angela Conway
- Billy Corgan
- Jonathan Dayton
- Dom and Nic
- Valerie Faris
- Kevin Kerslake
- Bart Lipton
- Jake Scott
- Stéphane Sednaoui
- W.I.Z.
- Yelena Yemchuck

== Certifications ==
Region	Certification	Certified units/sales
Australia (ARIA)	Platinum	15,000^{^}
^{^} Shipments figures based on certification alone.
