= Beguiled (song) =

Single by The Smashing Pumpkins

from the album Atum: A Rock Opera in Three Acts
- Released: September 20, 2022
- Recorded: 2018–2022
- Genre: Alternative metal; electronic rock
- Length: 3:58
- Label: Martha's Music
- Songwriter(s): Billy Corgan
- Producer(s): Billy Corgan

The Smashing Pumpkins singles chronology
"Purple Blood/Dulcet in E" (2020)	"Beguiled" (2022)	"Spellbinding" (2023)

Music video
- "Beguiled" on YouTube

"Beguiled" is a song by the American alternative rock band The Smashing Pumpkins. It was released as the first single from their twelfth studio album, Atum: A Rock Opera in Three Acts on September 20, 2022. The song debuted with a live music video premiering on TikTok directed by Linda Strawberry. The single was released digitally to streaming services the following day.

The song reached number seven on the Billboard Rock Airplay chart, the band's first top ten hit since "Tarantula" in 2007. In January 2023, the song peaked at number 12 on Billboard's Alternative Airplay chart. "Beguiled" was performed live for the first time on September 20, 2022 at the Metro, Chicago. The song was performed by the band on The Tonight Show with Jimmy Fallon on September 23, 2022.

== Background and recording ==
The single was the first to be released from the upcoming studio album Atum: A Rock Opera in Three Acts, a three-part concept album that acts as a sequel to 1995's Mellon Collie and the Infinite Sadness, 2000's Machina/The Machines of God and Machina II/The Friends & Enemies of Modern Music. The album was released in three separate acts of 11 songs with ATUM: Act One released on November 15, 2022, ATUM: Act Two released on January 31, 2023, and ATUM: Act Three released on April 23, 2023.

According to Billy Corgan, the song is sung from the perspective of the Authoritarian of the story, as relaying propaganda to the masses: "'Trust the message'. At the height of the pandemic, we kept saying trust the science. Having been in public life for 35 years, anytime anyone asks you to trust them, that's when I run. So it's a little bit like somebody saying, if you just have faith in what we stand for, everything will be fine."

The guitar riff for "Beguiled" came to fruition very early in the demo sessions for Atum: A Rock Opera in Three Acts. In the same interview with Kerrang magazine, Corgan described how the riff for the song came about and how the band in a rare move never changed the song from its initial inception, "...we never changed the tempo, which is very, very rare. Almost always you speed things up or whatever. But there's something about it being so slow that we just never changed. And that's probably the only thing on the entire record that didn't go through some sort of metamorphosis."

== Music video ==
The live performance video of the song was streamed live over TikTok on September 19, 2022. The video was directed by long-time band creative partner and Creative Director Linda Strawberry. Similarly to the music video for "Ava Adore", "Beguiled" was shot in one take, streamed live over TikTok. The video features a mix of live band performance, performance artists, dancers and various friends and family members of the band parading toward the fixed camera.

The edited version of the live performance music video premiered on YouTube on September 20, 2022 and serves as the song's official music video.

== Critical reception ==
Upon release the song received generally positive reviews. Writing for Billboard, Gil Kaufman called the song a "chugging, Black Sabbath-like single". In a NME review for the song, writer Tom Skinner described the song previewing the upcoming album as "the swaggering, all-guns-blazing 'Beguiled', which sees the Pumpkins return to their gritty, guitar-led sound." Guitar World writer Michael Astley-Brown said of the track; "Beguiled is a four-to-the-floor riffer that rarely lets up in its barrage of palm-muted chugs" and that it was "in the vein of classic Pumpkins cut Zero."

== Track listing ==
All tracks are written by Billy Corgan.

No.	Title	Length
1.	"Beguiled"	3:58

== Personnel ==
The Smashing Pumpkins

- Jimmy Chamberlin – drums
- Billy Corgan – vocals, guitar, bass, keyboards, production
- James Iha – guitar
- Jeff Schroeder – guitar

Technical personnel

- Billy Corgan – production, song writing

== Charts ==
=== Weekly charts ===
Weekly chart performance for "Beguiled"
Chart (2022)	Peak position
Canada Rock (Billboard)	25
US Rock & Alternative Airplay (Billboard)	7

=== Year-end charts ===
Year-end chart performance for "Beguiled"
Chart (2023)	Position
US Rock Airplay (Billboard)	25
