= Solara (song) =

Single by Smashing Pumpkins

from the album Shiny and Oh So Bright, Vol. 1 / LP: No Past. No Future. No Sun.
- Released: June 8, 2018
- Recorded: 2018
- Studio: Shangri Las
- Genre: Rock
- Length: 4:22
- Songwriter: Billy Corgan
- Producer: Rick Rubin

Smashing Pumpkins singles chronology
"Run2me" (2015)	"Solara" (2018)	"Silvery Sometimes (Ghosts)" (2018)

"Solara" is a song by American rock band Smashing Pumpkins. It was the band's first song to be released after reforming three fourths of the band's original lineup in 2018, featuring Billy Corgan, James Iha, and Jimmy Chamberlin performing on a track together for the first time since 2000's Machina/The Machines of God album and subsequent non-album single "Untitled" prior to their original breakup. It was released as a single on June 8, 2018, as the first song from a set of two upcoming EPs that were set for release in 2018 before a full-length album titled Shiny and Oh So Bright, Vol. 1 / LP: No Past. No Future. No Sun. was announced in September. The song peaked at number 47 on the US Hot Rock Songs chart.

== Background ==
The song was first released on June 8, 2018, making it the first song to be released by original members Billy Corgan, James Iha, and Jimmy Chamberlin in 18 years. The song does not feature original bassist D'arcy Wretzky, but does feature long-time guitarist Jeff Schroeder, who has been with the band since 2007. The song was produced by record producer Rick Rubin, who the band had previously worked with on the Adore track "Let Me Give the World to You".

The song made its live debut on national television on The Tonight Show Starring Jimmy Fallon on Monday, June 11, 2018.

== Writing and composition ==
The song was originally written and demoed for band's ninth studio album, Monuments to an Elegy (2014), with Corgan noting: "Jeff [Schroeder] and I were the only people in the band at that time and we just couldn’t find the magic. We always thought the song was strong [...] so when we came in, in this situation, the minute we put it in Jimmy Chamberlin's hands, it’s like, 'Oh, there’s the magic.' It got a lot easier after that." Guitarist Jeff Schroeder elaborated: "We didn’t over-intellectualize it and try to write a song that would reintroduce the band. I think that we just played, and I think certain characteristics that are strong points of the band came into play, and so I think that what you hear is very classic Pumpkins, because that’s kind of everybody doing their job and doing it well and it just works."

== Music video ==
A music video directed by Nick Koenig was released on June 28, 2018, containing "classic horror imagery". Rolling Stone described the video as "utterly bizarre", in which lead singer Corgan is "being held captive in an otherworldly asylum." The music video was not released in conjunction of the song's release, despite Corgan teasing a still frame from the video as early as May 2018.

== Reception ==
Consequence of Sound had a mixed response to the song, praising Chamberlin's drumming, but ultimately feeling that "'Tarantula' was a far more memorable reunion jam". Billboard described the song's sound as a "chest-out rock song, loaded with grinding guitars, a pounding rhythm section and big fills. The song was described as have "chugging" and "stuttering" sound in the verses building into a soaring and multi-layered chorus, with Corgan singing "Tear down the sun/Bring down the sun/I'm not everyone/I'm not everyone/I'm not everyone." Revolver noted that the song sounded more like the band attempting to tap into their established sound and "write a track that's fun" than push the boundaries of their sound artistically.

== Personnel ==
Band

- Billy Corgan – vocals, guitar, bass
- James Iha – guitar
- Jeff Schroeder – guitar
- Jimmy Chamberlin – drums

Production

- Rick Rubin – production

== Charts ==
Chart (2018)	Peak position
Canada Rock (Billboard)	30
US Hot Rock & Alternative Songs (Billboard)	47
US Rock & Alternative Airplay (Billboard)	46
