= Rotten Apples =

2001 compilation album by the Smashing Pumpkins

Greatest hits album by the Smashing Pumpkins
- Released: November 20, 2001
- Recorded: 1991–2000
- Genre: Alternative rock
- Length: 73:51 (US); 75:54 (International)
- Label: Virgin
- Producers: Billy Corgan; Ted de Bono; Flood; James Iha; Alan Moulder; Bjorn Thorsrud; Butch Vig; Howard Willing; Brad Wood

The Smashing Pumpkins chronology
Machina II/The Friends & Enemies of Modern Music (2000)	Rotten Apples (2001)	Earphoria (2002)

Singles from Rotten Apples The Smashing Pumpkins: Greatest Hits
- 1. "Untitled" Released: 2001

Professional ratings
Review scores
Source	Rating
AllMusic	4/5 stars
laut.de	4/5 stars
NME	4/5 stars

Rotten Apples (The Smashing Pumpkins – Greatest Hits as titled on the album's cover) is a greatest hits compilation album by alternative rock band the Smashing Pumpkins. In the US, it was released on November 20, 2001, along with a bonus disc titled Judas O. The album's concluding track, "Untitled", was the Pumpkins' final recording before their breakup. Completed in the days leading up to the band's farewell concert at the Metro in Chicago, it was also released as a single. Another notable track is "Real Love"; while previously released on Machina II/The Friends & Enemies of Modern Music, this was taken from the factory master tapes and, as a result, lacks the pops and clicks inherent in all copies of Machina II (which is vinyl sourced).

The title of the album comes from the name of a B-side that was originally released on the "Tonight, Tonight" single. Peaking at number 31 in the US, the album sold 77,000 units in its first week of being released.

== Release and reception ==
Rotten Apples was released on November 20, 2001. According to Dan Tallis, writing for BBC, this album was "[a] rare pleasure these days, a collection of tracks that span a band's career that can actually justify the Greatest Hits title." Regarding the Judas O disc, Tallis wrote, "[t]he Judas O B-sides and rarities collection will satisfy Pumpkin obsessives with its outtakes from the Adore and Machina sessions, but it simply cannot compete with its sister CD. 'Here's to the Atom Bomb', 'Waiting' and 'Rock On', (yes, a cover of the David Essex classic - which also features lyrics from Van Halen songs) stand out from the others, which at worst slip into incoherent rock ramblings."

== Track listing ==
There exist two versions of Rotten Apples; one is exclusive to North America and includes the song "Landslide", which is replaced by "Try, Try, Try" in the international version.

All tracks are written by Billy Corgan, except where noted.

US version
No.	Title	Writer(s)	Album	Length
1.	"Siva"		Gish (1991)	4:19
2.	"Rhinoceros^{a}"		Gish	5:52
3.	"Drown^{b}"		Singles: Original Motion Picture Soundtrack (1992)	4:30
4.	"Cherub Rock"		Siamese Dream (1993)	4:58
5.	"Today"		Siamese Dream	3:19
6.	"Disarm"		Siamese Dream	3:17
7.	"Landslide"	Stevie Nicks	Pisces Iscariot (1994)	3:08
8.	"Bullet with Butterfly Wings"		Mellon Collie and the Infinite Sadness (1995)	4:18
9.	"1979"		Mellon Collie and the Infinite Sadness	4:26
10.	"Zero"		Mellon Collie and the Infinite Sadness	2:40
11.	"Tonight, Tonight"		Mellon Collie and the Infinite Sadness	4:14
12.	"Eye"		Lost Highway soundtrack (1997)	4:57
13.	"Ava Adore"		Adore (1998)	4:20
14.	"Perfect"		Adore	3:23
15.	"The Everlasting Gaze"		Machina/The Machines of God (2000)	4:00
16.	"Stand Inside Your Love"		Machina/The Machines of God	4:14
17.	"Real Love"		Machina II/The Friends & Enemies of Modern Music (2000)	4:10
18.	"Untitled"			3:51

^a "Rhinoceros" is misprinted as "Rhinocerous" on the back cover and the disc. Also, the version on the compilation is the version off the Lull EP where the last 30 seconds of the original recording (some guitar noise) are cut off.
^bThe last half of "Drown" is also cut, getting rid of the extended guitar solo.

International version
No.	Title	Album	Length
1.	"Siva"	Gish (1991)	4:21
2.	"Rhinoceros"	Gish	5:54
3.	"Drown"	Singles: Original Motion Picture Soundtrack (1992)	4:30
4.	"Cherub Rock"	Siamese Dream (1993)	4:58
5.	"Today"	Siamese Dream	3:22
6.	"Disarm"	Siamese Dream	3:17
7.	"Bullet with Butterfly Wings"	Mellon Collie and the Infinite Sadness (1995)	4:17
8.	"1979"	Mellon Collie and the Infinite Sadness	4:24
9.	"Zero"	Mellon Collie and the Infinite Sadness	2:40
10.	"Tonight, Tonight"	Mellon Collie and the Infinite Sadness	4:16
11.	"Eye"	Lost Highway soundtrack (1997)	4:54
12.	"Ava Adore"	Adore (1998)	4:20
13.	"Perfect"	Adore	3:23
14.	"The Everlasting Gaze"	Machina/The Machines of God (2000)	4:02
15.	"Stand Inside Your Love"	Machina/The Machines of God	4:13
16.	"Try, Try, Try"	Machina/The Machines of God	5:09
17.	"Real Love"	Machina II/The Friends & Enemies of Modern Music (2000)	4:10
18.	"Untitled"		3:53
Total length:			76:10

== Personnel ==
=== The Smashing Pumpkins ===
- Jimmy Chamberlin – drums (except "Eye", "Ava Adore" and "Perfect")
- Billy Corgan – vocals, guitar, programming, mixing, production, art direction, bass guitar
- James Iha – guitar
- D'arcy Wretzky – bass guitar

=== Additional musicians ===
- Matt Walker – drums on "Ava Adore"
- Joey Waronker – drums on "Perfect"

=== Technical staff ===
- Ted de Bono – production on "Landslide"
- Bon Harris – additional programming on "Ava Adore" and "Perfect"
- Butch Vig – production on "Siva", "Rhinoceros", "Drown", "Cherub Rock", "Today", and "Disarm"
- Flood – production and mixing on "Bullet with Butterfly Wings", "1979", "Zero", "Tonight, Tonight", "Perfect", "The Everlasting Gaze", "Stand Inside Your Love", "Real Love", "Untitled", and "Try, Try, Try"; additional production and mixing on "Ava Adore" and "Perfect"
- Roger Lian – digital editing
- Alan Moulder – production and mixing on "Bullet with Butterfly Wings", "1979", "Zero", and "Tonight, Tonight"; mixing on "The Everlasting Gaze", "Stand Inside Your Love" and "Real Love"
- Jennifer Quinn-Richardson – production coordination
- Howie Weinberg – mastering
- Brad Wood – additional production on "Ava Adore"

=== Art ===
- Danny Clinch – photography
- Lynne Fischer – photography
- Lisa Johnson – photography, cover photo
- David LaChapelle – photography
- Michael Lavine – photography
- Melodie McDaniel – photography
- Greg Sylvester – art direction
- Yelena Yemchuk – photography

== Judas O ==
Judas O

Compilation album by the Smashing Pumpkins
- Released: November 20, 2001
- Recorded: 1995–2000
- Genre: Alternative rock
- Length: 70:12
- Language: English
- Label: Virgin
- Producers: Kerry "Mango" Brown; Billy Corgan; Ted de Bono; Flood; James Iha; Alan Moulder; Bjorn Thorsrud; Butch Vig; Howard Willing; Brad Wood

The Smashing Pumpkins chronology
Machina II/The Friends & Enemies of Modern Music (2000)	Judas O (2001)	Zeitgeist (2007)

Judas O (also known as Judas Ø) is a collection of B-sides and rarities by the Smashing Pumpkins. Initially released as free downloadable tracks by the band, it was ultimately packaged as a bonus disc in a limited-edition printing of the greatest hits collection Rotten Apples. The songs are from the Mellon Collie and the Infinite Sadness, Adore, and Machina/The Machines of God recording sessions, and some tracks can be found on The Aeroplane Flies High, and Machina II/The Friends & Enemies of Modern Music.

=== Track listing ===
All tracks written by Billy Corgan, except for "Believe" written by James Iha and "Rock On" written by David Essex.

#	Track	Previously unreleased	Notes	Length
1	"Lucky 13"	*	from Machina II	3:09
2	"Aeroplane Flies High"		Edited version, originally a B-side from the "Thirty-Three" single	7:53
3	"Because You Are"	*	Adore outtake	3:46
4	"Slow Dawn"	*	from Machina II	3:12
5	"Believe"		B-side from the "1979" single	3:12
6	"My Mistake"	*	Adore demo	4:00
7	"Marquis in Spades"		B-side from the "Zero" single	3:12
8	"Here's to the Atom Bomb"		B-side from the "Try, Try, Try" single, a different version is also available on Machina II	4:26
9	"Sparrow"	*	Adore demo	2:56
10	"Waiting"	*	Adore outtake, released on the untitled Machina promo	3:48
11	"Saturnine"	*	Adore outtake, a different version is also available on Machina II as "Satur9"	3:49
12	"Rock On"	*	David Essex cover, live recording of a song that was often played during the Sacred and Profane tour	6:06
13	"Set the Ray to Jerry"		B-side from the "1979" single	4:09
14	"Winterlong"	*	Machina demo	4:59
15	"Soot and Stars"	*	Machina demo	6:39
16	"Blissed and Gone"		Adore outtake, released on the promotional EP Still Becoming Apart	4:46

=== Personnel ===
The Smashing Pumpkins

- Melissa Auf der Maur – bass guitar on "Rock On"
- Billy Corgan – vocals, guitar, piano, producer, art direction
- Jimmy Chamberlin – drums
- James Iha – guitar, vocals, producer on "Believe"
- D'arcy Wretzky – bass guitar

Additional musicians

- Matt Cameron – drums on "Because You Are"
- Bon Harris – additional squeaks and plonks on "Saturnine"
- Rick Nielsen – additional guitar on "Blissed and Gone"
- Matt Walker – drums on "My Mistake"

Production

- Kerry "Mango" Brown – production on "Believe"
- Danny Clinch – photography
- Eric Ferris — executive producer
- Lynne Fischer – photography
- Flood – production on "Lucky 13", "Here's to the Atom Bomb", and "Set the Ray to Jerry"
- Lisa Johnson – photography, cover photo
- David LaChapelle – photography
- Michael Lavine – photography
- Roger Lian — digital editing
- Melodie McDaniel – photography
- Jennifer Quinn – production manager
- Greg Sylvester – art direction
- Howie Weinberg – mastering
- Yelena Yemchuk – photography

== Charts ==
=== Weekly charts ===
2001 weekly chart performance for Rotten Apples
Chart (2001)	Peak position
Australian Albums (ARIA)	4
Austrian Albums (Ö3 Austria)	22
Belgian Albums (Ultratop Flanders)	15
Belgian Albums (Ultratop Wallonia)	37
Canadian Albums (Billboard)	5
Finnish Albums (Suomen virallinen lista)	25
German Albums (Offizielle Top 100)	28
Italian Albums (FIMI)	15
New Zealand Albums (RMNZ)	5
Norwegian Albums (VG-lista)	11
Scottish Albums (Official Charts)	24
Swedish Albums (Sverigetopplistan)	31
Swiss Albums (Schweizer Hitparade)	40
UK Albums (OCC)	28
US Billboard 200	31

2024 weekly chart performance for Rotten Apples
Chart (2024)	Peak position
German Albums (Offizielle Top 100)	12

=== Year-end charts ===
Year-end chart performance for Rotten Apples
Chart (2001)	Position
Australian Albums (ARIA)	99
Canadian Albums (Nielsen SoundScan)	125

== Certifications ==
Region	Certification	Certified units/sales
Australia (ARIA)	Gold	35,000^{^}
Canada (Music Canada)	Platinum	100,000^{^}
New Zealand (RMNZ)	Platinum	15,000^{^}
Spain (Promusicae)	Gold	50,000^{^}
United Kingdom (BPI)	Platinum	300,000^{‡}
United States (RIAA)	Gold	500,000^{^}
Video
Australia (ARIA)	Platinum	70,000^{^}
Canada (Music Canada)	Platinum	10,000^{^}
France (SNEP)	Gold	10,000^{*}
United Kingdom (BPI)	Gold	25,000^{^}
United States (RIAA)	Gold	50,000^{^}
^{*} Sales figures based on certification alone.^{^} Shipments figures based on certification alone.^{‡} Sales+streaming figures based on certification alone.
