= Cyr (album) =

Studio album by the Smashing Pumpkins
- Released: November 27, 2020
- Genres: Synth-pop; electropop; alternative rock; new wave
- Length: 72:06
- Labels: Martha's Music; Sumerian
- Producer: Billy Corgan

The Smashing Pumpkins chronology
Shiny and Oh So Bright, Vol. 1 / LP: No Past. No Future. No Sun. (2018)	Cyr (2020)	Atum: A Rock Opera in Three Acts (2022–2023)

Singles from Cyr
- 1. "Cyr"/"The Colour of Love" Released: August 28, 2020; 2. "Confessions of a Dopamine Addict"/"Wrath" Released: September 25, 2020; 3. "Anno Satana"/"Birch Grove" Released: October 9, 2020; 4. "Ramona"/"Wyttch" Released: October 30, 2020; 5. "Purple Blood"/"Dulcet in E" Released: November 20, 2020

Cyr is the eleventh studio album by American alternative rock band the Smashing Pumpkins, released on November 27, 2020, on Sumerian Records. Produced by band leader Billy Corgan, the album features a synth-pop sound and was preceded by the release of ten of its songs as singles, with Corgan actively seeking out a "contemporary" sound during the recording process.

The release of Cyr was accompanied by a five-part animated series, In Ashes, written by Corgan and directed by Mike Anderson, which served as official videos for five of the album's tracks.

== Background and recording ==
After the band's previous album, Shiny and Oh So Bright, Vol. 1 / LP: No Past. No Future. No Sun. was released, the band toured in support of it, while at the time subtly talking about their upcoming recording efforts via Billy Corgan's Instagram stories. Drummer Jimmy Chamberlin notes that he and Corgan began planning the aesthetic of Cyr in early 2019, with Corgan sending him up to 35 potential song options: "It's hard when you start with, like, 35 songs. Then you just whittle them down, except the criteria for the record was pretty high. Billy started sending me sketches of stuff he was thinking about, and we started talking about the drum sound."

In early 2020, Corgan confirmed that a new album was in the process of being recorded: "In many ways, this is the first real album [since the reunion] where we've hunkered down and made a classic, 'Let's throw it all at the wall and see what happens' type of Pumpkins record. [...] This is the first album since the album that came out in 2000, Machina, where me, James and Jimmy worked on something for a very long time. It's got a greater conceptual base, and it's probably a wider swath of music. The last one was kind of like, 'Let's just jump in, record some stuff real fast, and let it be what it is,' so I'm excited about this, because we're kind of back in the lane of taking a risk, and trying to bring something new to the table, as opposed to just aping what we're known for."

Regarding the band's shift to a synth-pop sound, Corgan noted: "I got sick of making music that people kept telling me didn't sound contemporary. In my mind, I'm in a contemporary band. I'm a contemporary artist. [...] Now the positive thing there is I frame myself as a progressive musician. So I took that on and thought, 'OK, I'm gonna make contemporary music; I don't care what it takes'. I told the band, 'This is what we're gonna do' and everybody said, 'OK, fine'" Chamberlin elaborated, "Once we got a bead on what the record was gonna be, we had this pile of songs and they either translated to that architecture or they didn't, and that's kind of [how we got to] the 20 that we ended up with. They were the best of the best representation of that, ideologically."

Unlike the previous album, produced by Rick Rubin, Corgan self-produced Cyr, pushing himself to record and work outside his comfort zone: "I was trying to bring myself into modernity. I got Logic, I got some beats going, but I just wasn't feeling it. I started to feel like the Luddite who couldn't evolve. But then I realized that when I first heard Siouxsie and the Banshees, Sisters of Mercy and Joy Division, they were making very modern music by using the technology that they had at hand. So I had to get inside the choices that they made." The band members recorded parts on their typical instruments, with synthesizers being recorded by Corgan and backing vocals by Sierra Swan and touring member Katie Cole. Chamberlin notes that the sound of his drums on the album were influenced by "early-seventies prog rock bands, that type of tight dry drum sound."

== Release and promotion ==
Cyr was released on all digital platforms, as well as on CD and vinyl, on November 27, 2020. After the band teased the upcoming project with their countdown timers, they released the lead single "Cyr" and "The Colour of Love", on August 28, 2020, with an accompanying music video for the titular track. Several weeks later, the band released another single, which featured "Confessions of a Dopamine Addict" and "Wrath". This release also included 2 animated episodes of the band's short series In Ashes, which featured music from "The Colour of Love" and "Confessions of a Dopamine Addict". On October 9, 2020, the band released the third single from the album, "Anno Satana" and "Birch Grove", as well as the third episode of In Ashes. On October 30, 2020 the band released a fourth pair of songs as a single, "Ramona" and "Wyttch." On November 13, 2020, the band released a music video for "Wyttch" as part of a Friday the 13th event through their label Sumerian Records. The band released a final pair of songs, "Purple Blood" and "Dulcet in E" as the fifth single for Cyr.

The band was set to embark on the Rock Invasion 2 tour soon after recording wrapped up, but was forced to cancel due to the COVID-19 pandemic, which also led to the band having to remotely work on the music video for lead single "Cyr". The album was teased with a series of time counters on the band's website before the first single was released, and had five singles, which were all composed of two songs, as well as three music videos and a five-part animated short series that was released leading up to the album's release.

The title song was later used in promotion of the NWA Back For The Attack professional wrestling event, and the NWA Powerrr companion series, PowerrrSurge, both produced by the Corgan-owned National Wrestling Alliance.

== Reception ==
Professional ratings
Aggregate scores
Source	Rating
AnyDecentMusic?	5.9/10
Metacritic	61/100
Review scores
Source	Rating
AllMusic	3.5/5 stars
American Songwriter	4/5 stars
Clash	7/10
Classic Rock	3.5/5 stars
The Guardian	2/5 stars
Kerrang!	4/5
NME	3/5 stars
Rolling Stone	2/5 stars
Slant	3/5 stars
Under the Radar	5/10

The album earned mixed reviews. At Metacritic, which assigns a normalized rating out of 100 to reviews from mainstream critics, it holds an average score of 61 out of 100, which indicates "generally favorable reviews", based on 19 reviews. At AnyDecentMusic?, which collects critical reviews from more than 50 media sources, the album scored 5.9 points out of 10, based on 26 reviews.

A review by NME stated that the album was "far better than anything Corgan produced when he was running with the Pumpkins name on his own", while The Guardian called it "a synth-fuelled endurance test of an album." Rolling Stone was less positive, criticizing Corgan's move to an electro-pop and new wave sound on the album, stating that the reliance on synths made it sound more like a Corgan solo album, but that "unfortunately he has neither the singular vision he had in the Nineties nor the melodic savvy of Talk Talk's Mark Hollis to pull it off...most of the songs, all filled with neo-goth romantic lyrics, stumble and fumble over meandering melodies with no sing-along choruses to buttress them." Marc Burrows of The Quietus praised the album's tone and texture, but worried that it had limited sonic variety given its 70-minute running time, describing Corgan as having "a commendable ambition to move forward and a maddening stubbornness preventing that ambition growing past a certain point."

== Track listing ==
All tracks are written by Billy Corgan.

Cyr track listing
No.	Title	Length
1.	"The Colour of Love"	4:24
2.	"Confessions of a Dopamine Addict"	3:13
3.	"Cyr"	4:03
4.	"Dulcet in E"	3:21
5.	"Wrath"	3:45
6.	"Ramona"	3:48
7.	"Anno Satana"	3:49
8.	"Birch Grove"	3:16
9.	"Wyttch"	3:43
10.	"Starrcraft"	4:10
11.	"Purple Blood"	3:19
12.	"Save Your Tears"	3:31
13.	"Telegenix"	3:23
14.	"Black Forest, Black Hills"	4:42
15.	"Adrennalynne"	3:42
16.	"Haunted"	3:11
17.	"The Hidden Sun"	3:24
18.	"Schaudenfreud"	3:02
19.	"Tyger, Tyger"	2:49
20.	"Minerva"	3:32
Total length:		72:06

== Personnel ==
Personnel per booklet.

The Smashing Pumpkins

- Billy Corgan – vocals, guitar, bass guitar, synthesizers, production, mixing
- James Iha – guitar
- Jeff Schroeder – guitar
- Jimmy Chamberlin – drums

Additional musicians

- Katie Cole – backing vocals
- Sierra Swan – backing vocals

Production

- Howard Willing – engineering, production
- Tnsn Dvsn – design, art direction
- Howie Weinberg – mastering, recording
- David Schiffman – mixing
- Dan Burns – recording
- David Spreng – recording
- Tony Buchen – recording
- Nikola Dokic – recording

== Charts ==
Chart performance for Cyr
Chart (2020)	Peak position
Australian Albums (ARIA)	36
Austrian Albums (Ö3 Austria)	65
Belgian Albums (Ultratop Flanders)	154
Belgian Albums (Ultratop Wallonia)	49
Canadian Albums (Billboard)	66
German Albums (Offizielle Top 100)	31
Irish Albums (IRMA)	95
Italian Albums (FIMI)	42
Scottish Albums (Official Charts)	37
Swiss Albums (Schweizer Hitparade)	21
UK Albums (Official Charts)	71
UK Independent Albums (Official Charts)	13
US Billboard 200	86
US Top Rock Albums (Billboard)	10
