= Cyr/The Colour of Love =

2020 single by The Smashing Pumpkins

"Cyr"/"The Colour of Love"

Single by The Smashing Pumpkins

from the album Cyr
- Released: 27 August 2020
- Recorded: 2020
- Genre: Alternative rock, synth-pop
- Length: 4:03 ("Cyr"); 4:24 ("The Colour of Love")
- Label: Sumerian Records
- Songwriters: Billy Corgan; James Iha; Jimmy Chamberlin; Jeff Schroeder
- Producer: Billy Corgan

The Smashing Pumpkins singles chronology
"Knights of Malta" (2018)	"Cyr"/"The Colour of Love" (2020)	"Confessions of a Dopamine Addict / Wrath" (2020)

Music video
- "Cyr" on YouTube

"Cyr" and "The Colour of Love" are songs by the American alternative rock band The Smashing Pumpkins, released as a double-A side single from their eleventh studio album, Cyr. A music video was produced for "Cyr".

== Background and recording ==
"Cyr" and "The Colour of Love" were recorded in Chicago and produced by frontman Billy Corgan.

== Music videos ==
A black and white music video was directed, edited, and colored by Linda Strawberry. She has described the music video as “a goth fever dream of pent up emotion – an artistic visual release attempting to create a momentary escape from the emotional black cloud hanging over all of us this year. A dark seduction filmed in quarantine at a social distance.”

== Critical reception ==
Both songs generally received positive reviews. Consequence of Sound described “Cyr” as "a dance anthem that sounds like Adore meets ABBA", while they described “The Colour of Love” as an "all the midnight anthems within 2000’s Machina". They also added that both tracks "hearken back to Billy Corgan’s salad days, back when he worshipped The Cure on FM radio".

== Track listing ==
No.	Title	Length
1.	"Cyr"	4:03
2.	"The Colour of Love"	4:24

== Personnel ==
The Smashing Pumpkins

- Jimmy Chamberlin – drums
- Billy Corgan – vocals, guitar, bass, keyboards, production
- James Iha – guitar
- Jeff Schroeder – guitar

Additional personnel

- Katie Cole – background vocal
- Sierra Swan – background vocal

== Charts ==
Chart performance for "Cyr"
Chart (2020)	Peak position
US Alternative Airplay (Billboard)	19
US Rock & Alternative Airplay (Billboard)	35
