= Atum: A Rock Opera in Three Acts =

2023 studio album by the Smashing Pumpkins

Studio album by the Smashing Pumpkins
- Released: Atum: Act One: November 15, 2022; Atum: Act Two: January 31, 2023; Atum: Act Three: May 5, 2023
- Recorded: 2020–2022
- Genres: Alternative rock; progressive rock; synthpop; electronic rock
- Length: 138:09
- Labels: Martha's Music; Thirty Tigers
- Producer: Billy Corgan

The Smashing Pumpkins chronology
Cyr (2020)	Atum: A Rock Opera in Three Acts (2022–2023)	Aghori Mhori Mei (2024)

Singles from Atum: A Rock Opera in Three Acts
- 1. "Beguiled" Released: September 20, 2022; 2. "Spellbinding" Released: March 28, 2023; 3. "Empires" Released: April 13, 2023

Atum: A Rock Opera in Three Acts is the twelfth studio album by American rock band the Smashing Pumpkins. The album was released in three separate installments of 11 songs—Atum: Act One was released on November 15, 2022, Atum: Act Two was released on January 31, 2023, and Atum: Act Three was released on May 5, 2023. A physical box set consisting of all 33 songs, along with a group of 10 additional exclusive songs, under the title "Zodeon at Crystal Hall" was released in early May 2023.

Announced as a "sequel" album to Mellon Collie and the Infinite Sadness (1995) and Machina/The Machines of God (2000), Atum: A Rock Opera in Three Acts is a concept album. The album continues the interconnected story from the aforementioned albums. The story follows Shiny, previously known as Zero (Mellon Collie and the Infinite Sadness) and Glass (Machina/The Machines of God), as he struggles with his exile and the ramifications of his legacy. The album also tells the story from the perspectives of several characters, including June, Osirah and an organisation known as The X+I. Produced by Billy Corgan, the album has elements of alternative rock, electronic rock, progressive rock and synthpop.

Upon the album's release, critical reception was generally favourable. The majority of reviews praised the album's diversity in sound and how its staggered release helped listeners undertake the project's scale. Some critics were more critical with the album in comparison to the band's discography. The album had some commercial success worldwide, with the album reaching the top five in Australia and Scotland, and the top 20 in several European countries.

Three singles were issued from the album: "Beguiled", "Spellbinding" and "Empires". A podcast named Thirty-Three with William Patrick Corgan was released alongside the acts of the album, detailing the concept along with specials guests and retrospectives of the band's back catalogue. During the album's release cycle the band embarked on a North American tour named "Spirits on Fire" and continued with a world tour called "The World is a Vampire". The album marked the band's final studio album to feature guitarist Jeff Schroeder, before his departure in October 2023.

== Background ==
Frontman Billy Corgan first announced his plans to release a "sequel" concept album to Mellon Collie and the Infinite Sadness (1995) and Machina/The Machines of God (2000) in October 2020, shortly prior to the release of the band's eleventh studio album Cyr in November 2020. Corgan had wanted to create the sequel as early as 2017, but with developments including guitarist James Iha being back in the band for the first time in 18 years, and plotting a large tour around 3/4 of the original band being together again, he instead opted on the less-ambitious 8 song album Shiny and Oh So Bright (2018). The COVID-19 pandemic caused the band to cancel much of their planned tours, and Corgan decided to revisit the concept. The album was recorded over a span of two years, some of it concurrently with Cyr.

== Concept and structure ==
Atum is a concept album that Corgan describes as a sequel to the band's Mellon Collie and the Infinite Sadness and Machina/The Machines of God. The album tells the story of the same character followed in the prior two albums ("Zero" and "Glass" respectively), with the character now being much older than portrayed in the prior albums, and now known as "Shiny". Similar to the prior albums, the story is described by Corgan as having "...one foot in reality and one foot in a made up world... It's based on a lot of autobiographical things. But there's lots of things that are things I'm just interested in exploring that don't necessarily have anything to do with me."

Atum (pronounced the same as Autumn) was released in three main parts, called "Act 1, Act 2, and Act 3". Each act consists of 11 songs, and each act was released 11 weeks after the prior. Concurrent to the third act releasing, a physical box set containing all 33 songs, and an additional 10 extra songs, was also released. The release schedule was designed by Corgan to help listeners pace themselves in digesting the large body of work.

== Composition ==
The standard edition of the album consists of 33 songs, all written and produced by Billy Corgan with production assistance from Howard Willing. The album has elements of alternative rock (Note: As discussed by Pitchfork's Brad Shoup and Rolling Stone's Dan Epstein.), progressive rock (Note: As discussed by Pitchfork's Brad Shoup and Beats Per Minute's John Wohlmacher.), synth pop (Note: As discussed by Pitchfork's Brad Shoup and musicOMH's Ross Horton.) and synth rock (Note: As discussed by Pitchfork's Brad Shoup and Beats Per Minute's John Wohlmacher.). Contrary to Cyr's electronic and guitar-light sound, Corgan described Atum as more guitar-driven in its sound. He describes the sound as going "into a million different directions", noting that around a third of the album is "heavy", a third of it sounds "kind of more similar to what [the band has] been doing recently", and a third of it sounds more "esoteric" in advancing the concept/musical aspects of the album.

== Artwork ==
Atum's cover artwork contains visual similarities to a film poster designed in 1980 by Zdeněk Vlach for the Czech-market release of Ingmar Bergman's 1978 film Autumn Sonata. According to Pitchfork's Brad Shoup, the artwork "suggests a space-rock album illustrated by Roger Dean".

== Release and promotion ==
The album's title and three part release structure was announced on September 19, 2022. The album's first single, "Beguiled", was released the following day. Atum: Act One was released on November 15, 2022, Atum: Act Two was released on January 31, 2023, and Atum: Act Three was released on May 5, 2023. A physical box-set, consisting of all 33 songs, along with a group of 10 additional exclusive songs, was released in early May 2023. In the Fall of 2022 the band embarked on the Spirits on Fire tour across North America with Jane's Addiction and Poppy leading up to the album's first act releasing, with Our Lady Peace filling in on select Canadian dates for Jane's Addiction, and Meg Myers doing the same for Poppy.

On March 28, 2023 "Spellbinding" was released on streaming as the album's second single. The song was also featured in the end credits of Murder Mystery 2 on Netflix. On the same day that "Spellbinding" was released, the band also announced a summer tour entitled The World Is A Vampire tour. Consisting of amphitheaters and a couple of smaller indoor theaters, the band will continue to promote Atum while having support from Stone Temple Pilots, Interpol, and Rival Sons. The tour occurred after the festivals of the same name that took place in Mexico City and in 8 Australian cities. On April 13, 2023, the music video for "Empires" was released, showing performance footage from the Spirits on Fire tour. It was directed by Kevin Kerslake who also directed the music video for "Cherub Rock".

=== Zodeon at Crystal Hall ===
Simmatar/Magdalena 7" single artwork by artist Liz Hirsch

In addition to the standard release of Atum: A Rock Opera in Three Acts, an additional 10 tracks were released exclusively with the "1st Edition" box set through Corgan's Chicago based tea room Madame ZuZu's. The 10 tracks were released on five 7" double A-side singles and recorded live to tape in monophonic sound. In episode four of the Thirty-Three podcast Billy Corgan announced the tracks were part of the shelved Shiny and Oh So Bright series, being the third volume to 2018's Shiny and Oh So Bright, Vol. 1 / LP: No Past. No Future. No Sun. and 2020's Cyr albums. In the final episode of the podcast, he revealed the title of collection and that six of the tracks will feature on the future full release, with four being b-sides.

The collective tracks are mostly acoustic guitar driven and contain elements of psychedelic rock and folk music. Reception was positive towards the available tracks from Beats Per Minute's John Wohlmacher. He opined that the band had "already moved on to better things", having given Atum a mixed review. The artwork of the five singles, as with the artwork for Atum: A Rock Opera in Three Acts, was designed and created by artist Liz Hirsch.

Zodeon at Crystal Hall was released as an official album on vinyl in November 2025, with a newly curated sequencing compiled from the original limited 7-inch singles along with three additional tracks. The album was released on CD and digitally on May 15, 2026.

=== Thirty-Three with William Patrick Corgan ===
In September 2022, along with the announcement of the album, it was announced that a 33 episode weekly podcast, called Thirty-Three with William Patrick Corgan would be released. Each episode of the podcast featured, in track list order, a song from Atum: A Rock Opera in Three Acts and its narrative within the album's concept, special guest interviews as well as discussion of tracks from the band's back catalogue, side projects and solo works. Notable guests on the podcast included singers Willow Smith and Yungblud, pianist Mike Garson and producer and Garbage drummer Butch Vig.

== Critical reception ==
Professional ratings
Aggregate scores
Source	Rating
AnyDecentMusic?	6.6/10
Metacritic	72/100
Review scores
Source	Rating
AllMusic	4/5 stars
Beats Per Minute	52%
Classic Rock (de)	4/10
The Glasgow Guardian	2/10
musicOMH	3/5 stars
NME	4/5 stars
laut.de	2/5 stars
Pitchfork	6.3/10
Rolling Stone	3.5/5 stars
Sputnikmusic	2/5 (Note: Only Atum: Act II was reviewed and scored in this instance; the review does not assess the complete Atum: A Rock Opera in Three Acts.)

According to the review aggregator Metacritic, Atum: A Rock Opera in Three Acts received "generally favorable reviews" based on a weighted average score of 72 out of 100 from 7 critic scores.

A number of critics praised the album for its variety in sound, despite its overall length. Shoup, Rolling Stone's Dan Epstein, and NME's Damien Jones all praised the diversity of the tracks and the album's ambition. Pitchfork opined the "stylistic flexes are enjoyable", continuing "in its own ponderous way, it is generous". Others, including Allmusic's Matt Collar called the album "ambitiously sprawling" and summarized the record as having a "pleasing flow and emotional arc to the collection that draws you deeper in the further you go". In praise of listening experience, Rolling Stone declared the album as "the kind of record that requires your full attention".

Some critics were more critical of the album, comparatively to the band's back catalogue. Beats Per Minute's John Wohlmacher contrasted the album to the band's earlier studio albums, stating Atum "lacked the arcane glow of the occult Machina or romantic passion and gothic sensuality of Mellon Collie", later calling the album "the most controversial and strangest of all Smashing Pumpkins albums". musicOMH's Ross Horton, despite praising some of the tracks, pointed readers to the band's earlier work, stating "Listen to their first three albums on shuffle with a few short synth-pop instrumentals and you’ll have a much improved listening experience".

Dan Epstein of Rolling Stone spoke of the album's length, stating "a 33-song album totaling nearly two hours and twenty minutes would be a lot to digest". He opined that Corgan "wisely" premiered songs weekly through the Thirty-Three podcast, along with the truncated release of each act.

== Commercial performance ==
The album was successful in Australia, reaching the top five in the ARIA Top 100 Albums Chart, the band's first top 10 since Oceania in 2012. The album also reached the top five in the Scottish Albums Chart. In Europe, the album had minor chart success, reaching the top 20 on the Offizielle Top 100 albums chart in Germany and the Schweizer Hitparade Albums Top 100 in Switzerland. In the United States the album sold 9000 copies in its first week, with 4000 copies sold in the vinyl format. The album charted at number 111 on the Billboard 200, the bands first album since Gish in 1991 to not reach the top 100.

== Track listing ==
All tracks are written by Billy Corgan.

Atum: Act One
No.	Title	Length
1.	"Atum"	3:32
2.	"Butterfly Suite"	3:28
3.	"The Good in Goodbye"	4:40
4.	"Embracer"	3:39
5.	"With Ado I Do"	2:52
6.	"Hooligan"	3:05
7.	"Steps in Time"	3:49
8.	"Where Rain Must Fall"	4:15
9.	"Beyond the Vale"	3:42
10.	"Hooray!"	3:43
11.	"The Gold Mask"	3:36
Total length:		40:21

Atum: Act Two
No.	Title	Length
1.	"Avalanche"	5:42
2.	"Empires"	3:10
3.	"Neophyte"	4:16
4.	"Moss"	2:59
5.	"Night Waves"	2:53
6.	"Space Age"	3:12
7.	"Every Morning"	6:10
8.	"To the Grays"	3:12
9.	"Beguiled"	3:58
10.	"The Culling"	4:30
11.	"Springtimes"	4:01
Total length:		44:03

Atum: Act Three
No.	Title	Length
1.	"Sojourner"	7:41
2.	"That Which Animates the Spirit"	3:55
3.	"The Canary Trainer"	3:57
4.	"Pacer"	5:24
5.	"In Lieu of Failure"	3:26
6.	"Cenotaph"	3:04
7.	"Harmageddon"	4:20
8.	"Fireflies"	3:26
9.	"Intergalactic"	8:58
10.	"Spellbinding"	4:06
11.	"Of Wings"	5:28
Total length:		53:45

Audio Story
No.	Title	Length
1.	"Act 1 of ATUM"	25:05
Total length:		25:05

All tracks are written by Billy Corgan.

Zodeon at Crystal Hall (vinyl edition)
No.	Title	Length
1.	"Simmatar"	3:40
2.	"Magdalena"	3:22
3.	"Saffron"	2:57
4.	"Huzzah!"	3:01
5.	"Automaton"	3:31
6.	"Burr"	3:39
7.	"Excelsior"	2:22
8.	"Necromance"	3:36
9.	"Apocalypso"	2:50
10.	"MaryQ"	3:35
11.	"Story for Another Day"	2:59
12.	"The Bard"	3:03
Total length:		38:32

- The vinyl edition compiles most of its tracks from the original limited 7-inch singles but removes “Zope,” and adds three previously unreleased songs—“Apocalypso,” “Story for Another Day,” and “The Bard”.

== Personnel ==
The Smashing Pumpkins

- Billy Corgan – vocals, guitar, bass guitar, keyboards, composer, producer
- James Iha – guitar
- Jeff Schroeder – guitar, keyboards
- Jimmy Chamberlin – drums

Additional performers

- Alivia Enstrom – violin
- Andrew Dunn – cello
- April Rucker – choir/chorus
- Austin Hoke – cello
- Craig Nelson – string base
- David Angell – violin
- David Davidson – violin
- Devonne Fowlkes – choir/chorus
- Emily Bowland – clarinet, clarinet (bass)
- Erik Gratton – flute, flute (alto), flute (base)
- Jennifer Kummer – French horn
- Jovan Bender – choir/chorus
- Katie Cole – vocal arrangement, vocals (background)
- Kimberly Nicole Mont – choir/chorus
- Kimberly Fleming – choir/chorus
- Kristin Wilkinson – leader, viola
- Monisa Angell – viola
- Rachel Miller – harp
- Sierra Swan – vocals (background)
- Somerlie DePasquale – horn (English), oboe
- Steve Patrick – flugelhorn, trumpet
- Tim Lauer – adaption, arranger, celeste, harpsicord, percussion, piano
- Will Merrell – choir/chorus

Technical

- Andrew Scheps – mixing engineer
- David Paulin – engineer
- David Schiffman – mixing engineer
- Doug Clarke – engineer
- Howard Willing – engineer, mixing engineer
- Joe Trentacosti – engineer
- Josiah Mazzaschi – engineer
- Liz Hirsch – art direction, design
- Lowell Reynolds – engineer
- Matt Walker – programming
- Michael Grasley – design
- Nikola Dokic – engineer
- Paul Elledge – photography
- Ryan Smith – mastering
- Stephen Lamb – music preparation, orchestration

== Charts ==
Chart performance for Atum: A Rock Opera in Three Acts
Chart (2023)	Peak position
Australian Albums (ARIA)	5
Austrian Albums (Ö3 Austria)	50
Belgian Albums (Ultratop Flanders)	64
Belgian Albums (Ultratop Wallonia)	51
French Albums (SNEP)	131
German Albums (Offizielle Top 100)	18
Portuguese Albums (AFP)	23
Scottish Albums (Official Charts)	5
Spanish Albums (Promusicae)	62
Swiss Albums (Schweizer Hitparade)	16
UK Albums (Official Charts)	85
UK Independent Albums (Official Charts)	4
US Billboard 200	111
US Independent Albums (Billboard)	16
US Top Alternative Albums (Billboard)	10
US Top Rock Albums (Billboard)	15
US Top Hard Rock Albums (Billboard)	7
US Top Rock & Alternative Albums (Billboard)	20
