= Shiny and Oh So Bright, Vol. 1 / LP: No Past. No Future. No Sun. =

Studio album by The Smashing Pumpkins
- Released: November 16, 2018
- Recorded: February–June 2018
- Studio: Shangri La Studios, Malibu, California
- Genre: Alternative rock
- Length: 31:48
- Label: Martha's Music; Napalm
- Producer: Rick Rubin

The Smashing Pumpkins chronology
Monuments to an Elegy (2014)	Shiny and Oh So Bright, Vol. 1 / LP: No Past. No Future. No Sun. (2018)	Cyr (2020)

Singles from Shiny and Oh So Bright, Vol. 1 / LP: No Past. No Future. No Sun.
- 1. "Solara" Released: June 8, 2018; 2. "Silvery Sometimes (Ghosts)" Released: September 13, 2018; 3. "Knights of Malta" Released: November 7, 2018

Shiny and Oh So Bright Vol. 1 / LP: No Past. No Future. No Sun. (stylized in all caps) is the tenth studio album by the American alternative rock band The Smashing Pumpkins, released on November 16, 2018 through Napalm Records. Produced by Rick Rubin, it is the band's first album to feature founding members James Iha and Jimmy Chamberlin since Machina II/The Friends and Enemies of Modern Music (2000) and Zeitgeist (2007), respectively.

Initially planned as two four-song EPs, the release was preceded by the singles "Solara", "Silvery Sometimes (Ghosts)", and "Knights of Malta", and reached number fifty-four on the US Billboard 200 chart.

== Background and recording ==
In early February 2018, it was announced that original members James Iha and Jimmy Chamberlin had rejoined the band. The reunited line-up, alongside longtime guitarist Jeff Schroeder, started production on new material in February 2018 with Rick Rubin producing, the first time he had worked with the band since the Adore album cycle. Recording took place at Shangri La recording studio, Malibu, California. The group originally presented eight song demos to Rubin with the intention of releasing one as a comeback single. After Rubin approved of all eight, the group planned two four-song EPs, the first of which was originally scheduled to be released in May 2018. In September 2018, it was announced that the EPs would take the form of a full-length album. Former bassist D'arcy Wretzky claims Iha and Rubin's involvement in the album was limited, saying "He [Iha] was only involved in the one Rick Rubin song. Billy’s got a lot of nerve going out there saying Rick recorded the whole album. He only had a week to record one song."

In early 2020, while recording the band's follow-up album, Cyr, Billy Corgan retroactively dismissed Shiny and Oh So Bright's status as a full studio album: "When we got back together with James, we went in with Rick Rubin and did eight songs. It was put out as a formal album, but I said at the time — and I did mean it — in my eyes, it wasn’t an album. We didn’t approach it like we’ve approached every other album we’d ever done, which is more like making a movie."

In the final episode of the podcast Thirty Three with William Patrick Corgan, Corgan mentioned that the track "Alienation" actually began as the opening track for what would become the band's 2023 album Atum: A Rock Opera in Three Acts, but was vastly reworked into what became its final version.

== Release and promotion ==
The album's first single, "Solara", was released on June 8, 2018. The second single "Silvery Sometimes (Ghosts)" was released on September 13, 2018. The opening track "Knights of Malta" was secretly released as a private YouTube video on November 7, 2018.

Lead single "Solara" was performed live on national television on The Tonight Show Starring Jimmy Fallon on Monday, June 11, 2018.

== Reception ==
Professional ratings
Aggregate scores
Source	Rating
AnyDecentMusic?	6.4/10
Metacritic	65/100
Review scores
Source	Rating
AllMusic	4/5 stars
Consequence of Sound	B
Exclaim!	4/5 stars
NME	4/5 stars
Pitchfork	3.4/10
PopMatters	3/5 stars
Rolling Stone	2/5 stars
Slant	3/5 stars
Spectrum Culture	2.5/5 stars
Spin Magazine	4/5 stars

The album received generally positive reviews.

Consequence of Sound gave the album a B and named it album of the week. AllMusic claimed "Corgan delivers something unexpected: music that's rich but settled, music that plays to his strengths, music where he seems happy in his own skin." NME remarked "The heavier moments refuse to act as a sledegehammer of alt-rock pastiche, which this record could so easily have been. Instead, it’s a showcase of songcraft that’s allowed to breathe and reveal itself. Bring on volume two. The dream lives on." Spin Magazine noted "All signs pointed to Shiny and Oh So Bright ... as an authoritative step back on track."

Exclaim! was mixed on the album, stating "At only eight tracks, it's the shortest Smashing Pumpkins full-length and it feels less grandiose than most of their work simply due to that brevity, which makes it harder to measure against their other LPs--although it easily blows the last album out of the water and is more immediately catchy than Zeitgeist." DIY Magazine reported "There’s not much in the way of stylistic cohesion, either, and you wonder whether that’s simply because the creativity was flowing out of the almost-fully-reformed lineup or simply because Billy felt confident in following his every whim."

Rolling Stone published a more negative review, giving the album 2 out of 5 stars. Christopher R. Weingarten, writing for Rolling Stone, states that "no amount of Adore-ation can excuse the absolute maelstrom of inconsequential material that Pumpkins leader Billy Corgan, guitarist James Iha and drummer Jimmy Chamberlin have made in the 18 years since they’ve played on a Smashing Pumpkins record together." Weingarten concludes his review, stating "[s]ave the few fire-breathing dragon moments of Lollapalooza-era churn, it’s the Smashing Pumpkins in name only, and that ice cream truck has long left the gas station."

== Track listing ==
All tracks are written by Billy Corgan, except where noted.

Shiny and Oh So Bright, Vol. 1 / LP: No Past. No Future. No Sun. track listing
No.	Title	Writer(s)	Length
1.	"Knights of Malta"		4:37
2.	"Silvery Sometimes (Ghosts)"		3:31
3.	"Travels"		5:23
4.	"Solara"		4:22
5.	"Alienation"		5:01
6.	"Marchin' On"		2:39
7.	"With Sympathy"	Corgan, Jimmy Chamberlin	3:30
8.	"Seek and You Shall Destroy"		2:45
Total length:			31:48

== Personnel ==
=== The Smashing Pumpkins ===
- Billy Corgan – vocals, guitar, bass guitar, keyboards
- James Iha – guitar, bass guitar
- Jeff Schroeder – guitar
- Jimmy Chamberlin – drums

=== Additional musicians ===
- The Section Quartet – strings on "Knights of Malta" and "Alienation"
  - Daphne Chen – violin
  - Richard Dodd – cello
  - Eric Forman – violin
  - Leah Katz – viola
- Charissa Nielsen, Briana Lee, Missi Hale – additional background vocals on "Knights of Malta"

=== Production ===
- Rick Rubin – production
- Dana Nielsen – recording, mixing
- Jason Lader – additional recordings, strings recording
- Davis Spreng – additional recordings
- Vlado Meller – mastering

== Charts ==
=== Weekly charts ===
Chart (2018)	Peak position
Australian Albums (ARIA)	63
Austrian Albums (Ö3 Austria)	33
Belgian Albums (Ultratop Flanders)	71
Belgian Albums (Ultratop Wallonia)	58
Canadian Albums (Billboard)	66
Dutch Albums (Album Top 100)	79
French Albums (SNEP)	123
German Albums (Offizielle Top 100)	20
Irish Albums (IRMA)	84
Italian Albums (FIMI)	25
Japan Hot Albums (Billboard Japan)	97
Japanese Albums (Oricon)	90
Scottish Albums (OCC)	32
Spanish Albums (PROMUSICAE)	47
Swiss Albums (Schweizer Hitparade)	28
UK Albums (OCC)	43
UK Independent Albums (OCC)	3
US Billboard 200	54
US Independent Albums (Billboard)	2
US Top Alternative Albums (Billboard)	8
US Top Rock Albums (Billboard)	10

=== Year-end charts ===
Chart (2019)	Position
US Independent Albums (Billboard)	43
