= Spellbinding =

2023 single by The Smashing Pumpkins

Single by The Smashing Pumpkins

from the album Atum: A Rock Opera in Three Acts
- Released: March 28, 2023
- Recorded: 2018–2022
- Genre: Electronic rock, pop rock
- Length: 4:06
- Label: Martha's Music
- Songwriter: Billy Corgan
- Producer: Billy Corgan

The Smashing Pumpkins singles chronology
"Beguiled" (2022)	"Spellbinding" (2023)	"Empires" (2023)

"Spellbinding" is a song by American alternative rock band The Smashing Pumpkins. It was released as the second single from their twelfth studio album, Atum: A Rock Opera in Three Acts on March 28, 2023. The song was featured in the end credits of the Netflix film Murder Mystery 2, which was released on March 31, 2023.

In March 2023, the song reached number 26 on the Billboard Rock Airplay chart and number 16 on the Alternative Airplay chart.

== Track listing ==
All tracks are written by Billy Corgan.

No.	Title	Length
1.	"Spellbinding"	4:06

== Personnel ==
The Smashing Pumpkins

- Jimmy Chamberlin – drums
- Billy Corgan – vocals, guitar, bass, keyboards, production
- James Iha – guitar
- Jeff Schroeder – guitar

== Charts ==
=== Weekly charts ===
Weekly chart performance for "Spellbinding"
Chart (2023)	Peak position
US Alternative Airplay (Billboard)	16
US Rock & Alternative Airplay (Billboard)	26

=== Year-end charts ===
Year-end chart performance for "Spellbinding"
Chart (2023)	Peak position
US Alternative Airplay (Billboard)	45
