= Silvery Sometimes (Ghosts) =

Single by Smashing Pumpkins

from the album Shiny and Oh So Bright, Vol. 1 / LP: No Past. No Future. No Sun.
- Released: September 13, 2018
- Recorded: 2018
- Studio: Shangri La
- Genre: Alternative rock
- Songwriter(s): Billy Corgan
- Producer(s): Rick Rubin

Smashing Pumpkins singles chronology
"Solara" (2018)	"Silvery Sometimes (Ghosts)" (2018)	"Knights of Malta" (2018)

"Silvery Sometimes (Ghosts)" is a song by American alternative rock band The Smashing Pumpkins, written by the band's frontman, Billy Corgan. It was announced on the band's Twitter account on September 13, 2018. The song was released as the second single from the band's tenth album, Shiny and Oh So Bright, Vol. 1 / LP: No Past. No Future. No Sun., the same day. The track was recorded with Rick Rubin in early 2018 and is the second track from the reforming three-quarters of the band's original lineup.

== Background and recording ==
The single was released on September 13, 2018 and is the follow-up to the album’s first single "Solara", in its partially reformed incarnation. The song was produced by record producer Rick Rubin, who the band had previously worked with in the late '90s. It was recorded at the Shangri La recording studio, Malibu, California in early 2018.

== Music video ==
On September 13, 2018, Corgan announced on his personal Instagram account that production had wrapped on the music video for the song. The video was directed by Corgan himself and produced by long-time Smashing Pumpkins collaborator Linda Strawberry. Fans of the band were recruited as extras for the video. The music video features Mark McGrath of the rock band Sugar Ray playing the role of DJ Jackie Cherry, who has recruited the band to promote a Halloween haunted house charity event. The band must survive the night at the house to win the money for charity. Each member is visited by apparent ghosts and demonic creatures, including members of Drab Majesty, before it is revealed that Corgan is in control of all the preceding events that unfolded.

== Critical reception ==
Rolling Stone was positive about the track, describing it as having "bright melodies" and that it was reminiscent of the band's hit single "1979". Uproxx said the song "finds the band recapturing some of their past glory" and that Corgan's delivery is "melodic and accessible".

== Personnel ==
Band

- Billy Corgan – vocals, guitar, bass
- James Iha – guitar
- Jeff Schroeder – guitar
- Jimmy Chamberlin – drums

Production

- Rick Rubin – production

== Charts ==
Chart (2018)	Peak position
US Rock & Alternative Airplay (Billboard)	41
