= Try, Try, Try =

Single by the Smashing Pumpkins

from the album Machina/The Machines of God
- B-side: "Here's to the Atom Bomb"
- Released: September 11, 2000
- Recorded: 1999
- Length: 5:09
- Label: Virgin
- Songwriter: Billy Corgan
- Producers: Flood; Billy Corgan

The Smashing Pumpkins singles chronology
"I of the Mourning" (2000)	"Try, Try, Try" (2000)	"Untitled" (2001)

"Try, Try, Try" is a song by American alternative rock band The Smashing Pumpkins. It was the third and final single from the band's fifth studio album, Machina/The Machines of God, and was released on September 11, 2000. It was written by Billy Corgan, as was the B-side "Here's to the Atom Bomb".

== Song information ==
An alternate version of "Try, Try, Try" appears on the third EP of the album Machina II/The Friends & Enemies of Modern Music and the "Untitled" single. The alternate version is a more sparse version of the song, orchestrated on acoustic guitar with a repeating keyboard part, as opposed to the piano, synth, and electric guitar-heavy Machina version.

"Try, Try, Try" replaced "Landslide" on the international release of the band's greatest hits album Rotten Apples.

The single cover was designed by Vasily Kafanov and features alchemic symbols such as the 18th century Figuarum Aegyptiorum Secretarum and references to Christianity and Hermes Trismegistus.

== Music video ==
The music video for "Try, Try, Try" was a very different approach for a Pumpkins video, featuring only Corgan seated in a chair, despite instrumentation in the song from the other band members. The video was directed by Jonas Åkerlund and was adapted from a short film he made entitled Try, which followed the story of two homeless drug addicts named Linda and Max in Sweden. The video juxtaposes the somewhat upbeat music with graphic footage of a drug overdose, prostitution, and larceny. In contrast, there is also a very vibrantly happy dream sequence past the middle of the video, featuring a "perfect family" that suddenly takes an extreme turn for the worse. The video ends with Linda in hospital, now recovering from a heroin overdose and having suffered a miscarriage with Max holding her hand and hugging her. The fifteen-minute short film version, Try, expands the footage of the music video greatly; Linda is also heard in a voiceover waxing philosophically about her situation during the entire film. Sparse ambient sections of the song are used in this version of the video and Corgan is nowhere to be seen. The long version also features an alternate ending, where Linda dies of her overdose and when Max goes to her hospital room (which is mirrored from the music video edit), but it is empty, making him realize that he is too late. Linda's funeral takes place after this, where the coffin goes into the incinerator and the incinerator is sealed shut, ending the video. Both the music video and the short film are available on the DVD version of the Pumpkins' Greatest Hits Video Collection.

== Critical reception ==
Pitchfork called it one of the album's strongest tracks, opining that it sounds like "New Order in a crystal convertible flossed out with chrome."

== Track listing ==
All tracks are written by Billy Corgan.

"Try, Try, Try" track listing
No.	Title	Length
1.	"Try, Try, Try"	5:09
2.	"Here's to the Atom Bomb"	4:26

== Charts ==
Chart (2000)	Peak position
Italy (FIMI)	36
UK Singles (Official Charts)	73
