= Untitled (The Smashing Pumpkins song) =

Single by The Smashing Pumpkins

from the album Rotten Apples
- B-side: "Try"; "Age of Innocence"
- Released: 2001
- Recorded: 2000
- Genre: Alternative rock
- Length: 3:54
- Label: Virgin
- Songwriter: Billy Corgan
- Producer: Billy Corgan

The Smashing Pumpkins singles chronology
"Try, Try, Try" (2000)	"Untitled" (2001)	"Tarantula" (2007)

Music video
- "Untitled" on YouTube

"Untitled" is a song by American alternative rock band The Smashing Pumpkins, written by Billy Corgan. It was their final release and recording as a band before their breakup in 2000.

== Background ==
On November 29, 2000, just prior to the Pumpkins' penultimate show at the United Center in Chicago, Corgan debuted the song by presenting it to Q101 DJ James VanOsdol, saying that it was a "sort of special see-ya-later song". Q101 gave away a single copy of the single that was given to them by Corgan. The single featured the artwork of Rotten Apples, their greatest hits album. An official single was issued by Virgin Records in Europe with outtakes from the Machina/The Machines of God sessions as B-sides. There is only one known official mix of the song released on promotional acetate in the US, known as the 'Pop Mix'.

Corgan stated that "Untitled" intentionally sounds more like the earlier Pumpkins of Gish and Siamese Dream, and that they could always produce music that sounded like their older albums, but chose instead to try to push their music in new directions. Corgan later commented, "The song was our way of saying ‘fuck you’ to all those people who thought we’d somehow lost our minds and weren’t able to return home. We were in the studio for what appeared to be the last time, so it was very emotional, and we had only three days."

It was originally considered for use as the ending song for Shrek, but Smash Mouth's cover of "I'm a Believer" was used instead.

== Music videos ==
Two music videos for the song were released. The first was an edited collage of footage of the band from 1988 to 2000, and was only released through television and online content providers in the late summer of 2001. A second one was released as a secret feature (easter egg) on the band's Greatest Hits Video Collection. The video simply features footage of the band recording the song at the Chicago Recording Company, the band's preferred studio. Stills from this footage were used on the cover of the European single. The video was directed by Bart Lipton.

== Personnel ==
Neither D'arcy Wretzky nor her replacement Melissa Auf der Maur were present at the recording, leaving only three of the four core members active in the band at the beginning and end, so bass duties were handled by Billy Corgan as can be seen in the aforementioned "Studio" video.

== Track listing ==
All tracks are written by Billy Corgan.

No.	Title	Length
1.	"Untitled"	3:54
2.	"Try" (Alternate Version)	4:20
3.	"Age of Innocence" (Early Version)	4:14
