= Machina II/The Friends & Enemies of Modern Music =

Studio album by The Smashing Pumpkins
- Released: September 5, 2000
- Recorded: 1999–2000
- Studios: CRC, Chicago
- Genre: Alternative rock
- Length: 92:23
- Label: Constantinople
- Producers: Billy Corgan; Flood

The Smashing Pumpkins chronology
Machina/The Machines of God (2000)	Machina II/The Friends & Enemies of Modern Music (2000)	Rotten Apples (2001)

Machina II/The Friends & Enemies of Modern Music is the sixth studio album by the American alternative rock band The Smashing Pumpkins. It was released for free on the Internet on September 5, 2000. Plans for a standard physical release, bundled with the first part Machina/The Machines of God, were revealed to happen sometime in 2013, but was postponed due to legal setbacks. In an Instagram Q&A in 2018, the band's frontman, Billy Corgan, revealed that all legal issues had been resolved. The two albums were remastered and released as a deluxe box set on September 5, 2025.

The album itself, a double LP, was packaged with three EPs full of B-sides and alternate versions. The album's artwork was created by Carlos Segura. Both Machina albums are loose concept albums telling the story of "a rock star gone mad". Machina II was the last Smashing Pumpkins studio album until the band reformed in 2006, their final studio album to feature guitarist James Iha until his return in 2018, as well as the final album to feature their original line-up, as bassist D'arcy Wretzky departed during the recording of both Machina albums and did not return when the band reformed.

== Background ==
Near the conclusion of the Machina sessions, it was Billy Corgan's wish to release a double album of material, but Virgin Records was unwilling to do so following the disappointing sales of Adore. After the release and poor sales of the single-disc Machina/The Machines of God, Corgan then wanted to release the second Machina album separately, but Virgin declined this as well. The band nonetheless returned to the Chicago Recording Company in July 2000 to finish what would become Machina II/The Friends & Enemies of Modern Music, which was subsequently released on Corgan's own Constantinople Records label. Only twenty-five vinyl copies were made, and were given mostly to friends of the band in addition to radio station Q101. A few of the 25 copies were shipped to prominent fans in the online community with instructions to rip and redistribute the album on the Internet free of charge. Because of this, all publicly available digital copies of the album are vinyl rips.

== Composition ==
The A.V. Club stated that Machina II reflects "Corgan's obsession with dream-pop, Cure- and Depeche Mode-styled synth-goth, and glam-tinged heavy metal." The album picks up the thematic elements of "Glass and The Machines of God" started in Machina/The Machines of God. Songs like "Glass' Theme", "Cash Car Star", "Home", and the B-side "Speed Kills" are related to Corgan's story. The first three songs ("Glass' Theme", "Cash Car Star", and "Dross"), considerably more intense than much of the Pumpkins' other releases, are a hearkening to the earlier, famous Smashing Pumpkins sound, blending dream pop with arena rock, while "Let Me Give the World to You" has a melodic, radio-friendly sound. "Real Love", which would later appear on the band's Rotten Apples, has a sound reminiscent of My Bloody Valentine. "Home" has been called "simply gorgeous" and compared to U2. The album's closing track, "Here's to the Atom Bomb", has been compared favorably to the Pumpkins' biggest hit, "1979".

== Promotion ==
The Pumpkins performed a track from the album ("Cash Car Star") on The Tonight Show with Jay Leno, which also ended up being the band's final television appearance until their 2007 revival. A previous live performance of the song, in an earlier and slightly different-than-final-version form, had been broadcast as a portion of Kiss' 1998 Psycho Circus Halloween special, where The Smashing Pumpkins served as the opening act.

== Critical reception ==
Professional ratings
Review scores
Source	Rating
AllMusic	3/5 stars
The A.V. Club	favorable
Kerrang!	4/5 stars
laut.de	5/5 stars
Pitchfork	7.7/10
The Tech	favorable

Because it was not released conventionally, few professional reviews of the album were published; however, those that surfaced were generally positive. The A.V. Club called it an "artistic high" for the band. Pitchfork opined that while the band sounded "energized and at a creative peak", "there isn't really any new ground broken here, but the band revisits nearly every style they've adopted over the years", ultimately concluding that listeners should "take this as a proper farewell to the Smashing Pumpkins" and that "it's a nice album to remember them by". AllMusic stated that "As a high-class artifact and a gift to a loyal fan base, Machina II is a winner." The Michigan Daily also published a review calling the music "some of the best Pumpkins material to date".

In April 2010, Billy Corgan commented on the album's reception, stating that: "I think the fan response at the time was very positive, as the fans who were around at the time seemed to like Machina II better than Machina I. That said, Machina I is proving now to be the more influential part of the work for many of the younger bands that I've talked to. [...] At the time I saw [releasing the album for free] as a one-time thing. I never thought we would see a near collapse of the music business and its dominant control on how music reaches people."

== 25th anniversary reissue ==
On January 28, 2021, NME reported that the Machina reworking was complete and Billy Corgan stated that it will contain at least 80 songs. On March 31, 2025, Corgan announced that a twenty-fifth anniversary box set edition of the material from Machina/The Machines of God and Machina II/The Friends & Enemies of Modern Music would be released on August 22, 2025. The new Machina: Aranea Alba Editio contains 80 fully remixed and remastered songs including the majority of Machina II, divided as a 48-song version of a combined Machina and 32 b-sides, outtakes and live cuts.

== Track listing ==
All tracks are written by Billy Corgan, except where noted.

Two-LP set (CR-04)
No.	Title	Length
1.	"Glass" (sometimes listed as "Glass' Theme")	1:54
2.	"Cash Car Star"	3:18
3.	"Dross"	3:26
4.	"Real Love"	4:16
5.	"Go" (James Iha)	3:47
6.	"Let Me Give the World to You"	4:10
7.	"Innosense (Corgan/Iha)"	2:33
8.	"Home"	4:29
9.	"Blue Skies Bring Tears" (sometimes subtitled "Version Electrique" or "Heavy")	3:18
10.	"White Spyder"	3:37
11.	"In My Body"	6:50
12.	"If There Is a God" (sometimes subtitled "Full Band")	2:08
13.	"Le Deux Machina" (sometimes subtitled "Synth")	1:54
14.	"Atom Bomb" (sometimes listed as "Here's to the Atom Bomb" and subtitled "Alternate Take" or "New Wave Version")	3:51

EP one (CR-01)
No.	Title	Length
1.	"Slow Dawn"	3:14
2.	"Vanity"	4:08
3.	"Saturnine" (sometimes listed as "Satur9")	4:11
4.	"Glass" (sometimes listed as "Glass' Theme" and subtitled "Alternate Version" or "Spacey Version")	2:55

EP two (CR-02)
No.	Title	Length
1.	"Soul Power" (James Brown)	3:02
2.	"Cash Car Star" (sometimes subtitled "Version 1", "Version I", "Alternate" or "Alternate Take")	3:41
3.	"Lucky 13"	3:05
4.	"Speed Kills" (sometimes listed as "Speed Kills But Beauty Lives Forever" or "Speed Kills (But Beauty Lives Forever)")	4:51

EP three (CR-03)
No.	Title	Length
1.	"If There Is a God" (sometimes subtitled "Piano and Voice" or "Piano/Vox")	2:34
2.	"Try" (sometimes listed as "Try, Try, Try" and subtitled "Version 1", "Version I", "Alternate", "Alternate Music/Lyrics" or "Alternate Take")	4:23
3.	"Heavy Metal Machine" (sometimes subtitled "Version 1 Alternate Mix", "Version I Alternate Mix" or "Alternate Take")	6:47

- The two-LP set is the album itself. Corgan has said that the three EPs are "technically the B-sides." CR-01, CR-02, etc. all refer to their released on Constantinople Records (Constantinople Records-Released 1, etc.). The only other Constantinople release, CR-05, was Live at Cabaret Metro 10-5-88, a gift given to fans exiting their farewell concert at the Cabaret Metro. The songs "Let Me Give the World to You", "Saturnine", and "Cash Car Star" were originally written and recorded for Adore. The original "Let Me Give the World to You" was produced by Rick Rubin, and was later released on the deluxe edition of the 2014 reissue of Adore, alongside demos and remixes of "Saturnine" and a remixed version of Cash Car Star.

== Personnel ==
- Billy Corgan – vocals, guitars, bass, keyboards, piano
- James Iha – guitars, bass, vocals on "Go"
- D'arcy Wretzky – bass guitar
- Jimmy Chamberlin – drums, percussion

== Release sources ==
A number of a release sources exist for Machina II. All of them are sourced from vinyl (except for the noted commercial releases of select tracks).

Virgin promos
This source is from in-house promo CDs made for internal use at Virgin Records (sourced from the vinyl records), made before Machina II was released to the public over the Internet. Two versions of the promos exist, a UK (type I) and U.S. (type II) version, both with four CDs corresponding to the vinyl copies. As it was done in-house at a record company, it is generally assumed to be a high-quality transfer, though some of the faint voices which can be heard in the background before some of the EP songs are cut off, and, in general, it is missing a considerable amount of audio between song transitions.

Q101 transfer
As mentioned above, the radio station Q101 received one of the 25 vinyl copies. It was subsequently transferred to two CDs by the station (one CD containing the EP tracks and one containing the LP tracks). The transfer was done by a high-profile radio station (presumably with high-end equipment and professional oversight) and spectral analysis shows the transfer to be of good quality. Copies were given away as prizes from the station. It is worth noting that this transfer is the only one to have been digitally mastered.

SPIFC transfer
The SPIFC transfer was produced from a vinyl copy by a member of the SPIFC. A transfer was eventually performed onto two CDs with "high-end" equipment. The SPIFC offers MP3 downloads of the transfer to members and held a contest giving away CD-R copies. The SPIFC transfer shows a 21 kHz tone which casts some doubt on the quality of the transfer.

MP3 web releases
Following the vinyl release a number of MP3 versions quickly surfaced on the web. A select number of people involved in the Smashing Pumpkins online fan community received one of the 25 releases. Using audio equipment they had immediate access to, these tracks were recorded, encoded to MP3, and quickly released for the masses. Later MP3 releases may be from one of the CD sources listed above or newer lesser-known transfers. The Smashing Pumpkins' official site also had the full 25 tracks for download in both mp3 format (at 320 kbit/s) and in RealAudio format. In 2007, the album was once again posted for download on the newly reopened SmashingPumpkins.com.

Commercial releases
Four tracks from Machina II have been released commercially. These are of specific note, because these versions were sourced from the master tapes rather than amateur vinyl transfers. "Real Love" was featured on Rotten Apples. "Lucky 13" and "Slow Dawn" appeared on Judas O, which was included with early copies of Rotten Apples. The Machina II version of "Try, Try, Try" was one of the B-sides to the "Untitled" single, titled "Try" (Alternate Version). The studio banter that precedes "Try, Try, Try" on Machina II has been removed from this version. All tracks included in Machina 1 and 2 are set to be released on September 5th 2025 in remixed and remastered form on "Machina: Aranea Alba Editio"
