= Let Me Give the World to You =

Song by The Smashing Pumpkins

from the album Adore (2014 Reissue) and Machina II/The Friends & Enemies of Modern Music
- Released: September 5, 2000; September 23, 2014 (original)
- Genre: Alternative rock, electronic rock
- Length: 3:26
- Songwriter(s): Billy Corgan
- Producer(s): Billy Corgan, Rick Rubin

"Let Me Give the World to You" is a song from the American alternative rock band The Smashing Pumpkins. The song, produced with music producer Rick Rubin in 1997 during the sessions for Adore album, was removed from the album at the last second by band frontman Billy Corgan, who did so as a last-ditch effort to keep the record company from releasing it as a single against his wishes. A heavily reworked version was recorded for their 2000 album Machina II without Rubin's help. Still, the song would go unreleased for sixteen years until being put on the extended reissue of Adore in 2014.

== Background and recording ==
After the band's breakthrough success with the very guitar-heavy Siamese Dream album in 1993, among the grunge movement of the early 1990s, the band moved into a more eclectic collection of music in their next album, Mellon Collie and the Infinite Sadness. The band retained their guitar-driven sound, but also experimented in other musical sounds, most notably their single "1979", which had a stripped-down, simple guitar and electronic sounds. The song ended up being the band's biggest hit, reaching number 12 on the Billboard Hot 100 and number one on the Mainstream Rock Tracks and the Modern Rock Tracks charts.

The song's success inspired frontman Billy Corgan to pursue a more minimalist and electronic sound for their next album, which would be 1998's Adore. However, the sessions were very long and difficult for the band; after the sprawling and massively successful album, Corgan found himself facing many difficult issues, including musical burnout, the absence of his "best friend and musical soul mate in the band" Jimmy Chamberlin, who was kicked out of his band due to continued issues with drug addiction, the end of his marriage, and the death of his mother to cancer.

The band's record label and management, growing concerned with the album's new direction and lack of progress, decided to send influential music producer Rick Rubin to assist Corgan in the studio. Corgan agreed to work with him on a song, the result being "Let Me Give the World to You". Corgan enjoyed working with Rubin on the track, but felt creative control slipping away, and limited his input to the one song. The track was considered to be on the album until just before the release of the album - it was completely mixed and mastered with the rest of the album, with it being planned as the album's closer. Corgan felt that while it didn't fit well with Adore's artistic direction, putting it at the end of the album helped it stand out less, and would serve as his backup plan as a future single if the album's new direction wasn't well received. Plans changed when Corgan learned at the last second that his record label was insisting that it instead be the album's lead single. Corgan felt that the poppy, upbeat sound misrepresented the album's more sombre and introspective direction. Corgan explained:

And the true story is, I handed in the record to the record company. And I get the call, they want to make ‘Let Me Give the World to You’ the first single. And I was like, ‘Hell, no.’ And the only way I could stop them was to take it off the record. Someone asked me about this, ‘It sounds like it could have been a hit song at that time, so why take it off the record?’ And I said, ‘Because I spent a whole f—ing year trying to make this avant-garde thing.’ ‘Perfect’ or ‘Ava Adore’ were more representative [of the album], and now we’re gonna release the song with the dry, milquetoast production. And it isn’t even as avant-garde as the stuff on Mellon Collie, much less Adore! I didn’t want to step back to simple pop [on the single], and then try to sell this avant-garde record! It wasn’t that I hated it, or even that I hated what Rick had done. He did a great job. It was more than I didn’t want to blow up everything I’d done for this one song. So the song had to go. And in the basement it went, for sixteen or eighteen years.

With the song being cut from the album, "Ava Adore" and "Perfect" would subsequently be the singles released from the album in its place.

== Release and promotion ==
While the song was withheld from the final version of Adore's original release in 1998, a different, alternate version of the song was recorded and released on Machina II/The Friends and Enemies of Modern Music in 2000. The original Adore version was finally released in 2014, on the extended re-issue of Adore, sixteen years after its initial planned release on Adore. The song was debuted by the band, putting it up for streaming on YouTube in August, followed by its official release on the Adore reissue in September.

== Reception ==
Reception for the Adore version of the song was generally positive, with many journalists noting that it would have fit well into the rest of the band's catalogue of songs in the 1990s. Rolling Stone praised the song for being more "upbeat" and "straightforward" than their 1998 singles for Adore, concluding that "It's got all the marks of the Pumpkins' big hits, deciding to hold it in favor of "Ava Adore" all the more frustrating." Both Colin Joyce of Spin and Michael Nelson of Stereogum asserted that it sounded like it belonged on Mellon Collie and the Infinite Sadness, the former calling it "essential listening" and the latter calling it "a really good song". Exclaim! Praised the song as well, calling it "immaculately produced" and disagreeing with Corgan's notion that it wouldn't have fit on Adore's original release.

The Machina II version of the song generally received less attention, due to the album being released for free on the internet just before the band's 2000 breakup, but still received positive marks from critics. Joshua Klein of The A.V. Club referred to the track as the most "shocking" of the album, referring to it as "prettier and more accessible than virtually anything the band has done".
