= Stand Inside Your Love =

2000 single by the Smashing Pumpkins

Single by The Smashing Pumpkins

from the album Machina/The Machines of God
- B-side: "Speed Kills"
- Released: February 8, 2000
- Genre: Dream pop; pop rock
- Length: 4:12
- Label: Virgin
- Songwriter: Billy Corgan
- Producers: Flood; Billy Corgan

The Smashing Pumpkins singles chronology
"The Everlasting Gaze" (1999)	"Stand Inside Your Love" (2000)	"I of the Mourning" (2000)

Music video
- "Stand Inside Your Love" on YouTube

"Stand Inside Your Love" is a song by American alternative rock band the Smashing Pumpkins. It was released as the second US single and the lead international single from their fifth studio album, Machina/The Machines of God (2000). The song was written by Billy Corgan.

== Content ==
Billy Corgan claims the song is written about his then-girlfriend Yelena Yemchuk. He explained, "'Stand Inside Your Love' is one of those rare songs that seems to write itself really quickly... As far as the song goes, it's sort of a love song that rocks, which is pretty rare, even for me. And I even got my girlfriend dancing in the video, so it's all a tribute to my girlfriend, I guess." Corgan would also call it the only "true" love song he's ever written.

"Stand Inside Your Love" was initially conceived to be similar to the new wave style of the band's earlier hit "1979"; however, Corgan opted for what he considered "the classic Pumpkins sound".

The single contains one B-side, "Speed Kills", which appears in a shortened form on the vinyl and import CD versions of Machina, and in a heavier incarnation on the band's following album Machina II/The Friends & Enemies of Modern Music.

The single cover of "Stand Inside Your Love" was designed by Vasily Kafanov and is primarily a depiction of the alchemical androgyne, one of the most significant symbolic representations within alchemy, and, on its most basic level, represents the perfect union between man and woman when joined as a single entity. Atop their head is a single crown, known to the Kabbalists as Kether, the source of all creation, and the first Sephiroth on the Tree of Life.

== Release ==
While "The Everlasting Gaze" was the lead single in the United States from Machina, with a promotional single and music video released, "Stand Inside Your Love" was ultimately released as the lead international single.

== Music video ==
The music video of "Stand Inside Your Love" is a tribute to the 1891 play Salomé by Oscar Wilde. Billy Corgan created the video's look together with English director W.I.Z. under the heavy influence of original Salomé illustrations by Aubrey Beardsley. The man sitting on the throne is played by Ken Davitian, known later for his role as Azamat Bagatov in the movie Borat. Corgan's then-girlfriend Yelena Yemchuk played the main character in the video.

Sharon Osbourne cited her dislike for the music video, along with her conflicts with Corgan, as a motive for her departure from the band's management. The music video won the Most Visionary Video award at the 2000 VH1 Fashion Awards.

== Track listing ==
All tracks are written by Billy Corgan.

No.	Title	Length
1.	"Stand Inside Your Love"	4:16
2.	"Speed Kills"	5:17

== Charts ==
=== Weekly charts ===
Chart (2000)	Peak position
Australia (ARIA)	31
Canada Rock/Alternative (RPM)	3
Europe (Eurochart Hot 100)	69
Iceland (Íslenski Listinn Topp 40)	14
Ireland (IRMA)	30
Italy (FIMI)	4
New Zealand (Recorded Music NZ)	17
Norway (VG-lista)	12
Scottish Singles Sales (Official Charts)	22
Spain (Promusicae)	4
Sweden (Sverigetopplistan)	43
UK Singles (Official Charts)	23
UK Rock & Metal (Official Charts)	1
US Alternative Airplay (Billboard)	2
US Mainstream Rock (Billboard)	11

=== Year-end charts ===
Chart (2000)	Position
US Mainstream Rock Tracks (Billboard)	57
US Modern Rock Tracks (Billboard)	37

== Release history ==
Region	Date	Format(s)	Label(s)	Ref.
United States	8 February 2000	Mainstream rock; active rock radio	Virgin	
United Kingdom	21 February 2000	CD; cassette	Hut; Virgin	
