= The Everlasting Gaze =

1999 single by the Smashing Pumpkins

- Cover of the promo CD

Single by the Smashing Pumpkins

from the album Machina/The Machines of God
- Released: December 14, 1999
- Genre: Alternative metal; industrial rock
- Length: 4:01
- Label: Virgin
- Songwriter: Billy Corgan
- Producers: Flood; Billy Corgan

The Smashing Pumpkins singles chronology
"Crestfallen" (1998)	"The Everlasting Gaze" (1999)	"Stand Inside Your Love" (2000)

Alternative cover
- VHS single cover

"The Everlasting Gaze" is a song written by Billy Corgan and recorded by the Smashing Pumpkins. It is the opening track from the band's fifth studio album, Machina/The Machines of God (2000). The song was released as the lead North American single on December 14, 1999. It was also originally going to be released internationally in January 2000, but despite the heavy rotation of the Jonas Åkerlund-directed music video, it was rejected in favor of "Stand Inside Your Love".

== Song information ==
The unique guitar sound in the song was achieved by using a small Crate practice amp. Corgan has said that this song "has a lot to do with spirituality and trying to find my place in the universe and sort of humbly accepting limitations and the things I've been graced with. It's more of a humanistic world view. I'm not writing anymore for the tortured teen—both me and whoever was listening. I'm writing with the idea that everybody's experiencing these things all the time, and even if they're not experiencing them personally, they're affected by them. You can live in the street and write about the garbage, or you can try to get up a little higher and look down and try to see the bigger picture."

During the recording of Machina/The Machines of God, an early version of this song with very different lyrics had the working title of "Disco King". The final version of the song retains Chamberlin's consistent use of offbeat hi-hat beats. The final chorus was cut from the final version, though an a cappella section was added.

== Music video ==
The music video was directed by Jonas Åkerlund and is a performance-based music video, the first to feature Melissa Auf der Maur, playing bass with the band after the departure of D'arcy Wretzky. Originally, the band had considered Jonathan Dayton and Valerie Faris to direct the video.

== Charts ==
=== Weekly charts ===
Chart (2000)	Peak position
Canada Rock/Alternative (RPM)	11
US Mainstream Rock (Billboard)	14
US Alternative Airplay (Billboard)	4

=== Year-end charts ===
Chart (2000)	Position
US Mainstream Rock Tracks (Billboard)	69
US Modern Rock Tracks (Billboard)	59
