= Machina/The Machines of God =

2000 studio album by the Smashing Pumpkins

Studio album by the Smashing Pumpkins
- Released: February 29, 2000
- Studios: Sadlands (Chicago); Pumpkinland (Chicago); CRC (Chicago)
- Genres: Alternative rock; alternative metal
- Length: 73:23
- Label: Virgin
- Producers: Billy Corgan; Flood

The Smashing Pumpkins chronology
Adore (1998)	Machina/The Machines of God (2000)	Machina II/The Friends & Enemies of Modern Music (2000)

Singles from Machina/The Machines of God
- 1. "The Everlasting Gaze" Released: December 9, 1999; 2. "Stand Inside Your Love" Released: February 21, 2000; 3. "Try, Try, Try" Released: September 11, 2000

Machina/The Machines of God is the fifth studio album by the American alternative rock band the Smashing Pumpkins, released on February 29, 2000, by Virgin Records. A concept album, it marked the return of drummer Jimmy Chamberlin and was intended to be the band's final official LP release prior to their initial breakup in 2000. A sequel album—Machina II/The Friends & Enemies of Modern Music—was later released independently via the Internet, and in highly limited quantities for the physical version.

Following the electronic and industrial rock elements established by its predecessor, Adore, Machina again proved controversial to the band's fan base and failed to reconnect them with chart-topping success. However, after the relatively brief Adore tour, the new lineup with Chamberlin and the former Hole bass guitarist Melissa Auf der Maur mounted longer international tours that returned the live incarnation of the band to a guitar-driven hard rock style.

== Background and concept ==
After the Adore tour ended in the second half of 1998, lead singer/guitarist Billy Corgan immediately began to work on new material, playing new songs as early as October of that year. In the same month, the four original band members convened, and decided that Jimmy Chamberlin would rejoin the band, and that a final album and tour would be mounted before the group disbanded permanently. "If you want to know what Jimmy brings back to the band," Corgan told Q, "then listen to Adore and this new record back-to-back. It speaks for itself." According to an August 19, 2014 interview with Ryan Leas, Corgan explained about Adore, "I was thinking like, you know, what the Beatles did with Sgt. Pepper's. Why can't we make a really different type of record? So that was my thinking going into it."

Corgan envisioned a lengthy concept album in conjunction with a musical theater approach to a tour, based around the idea of the band playing exaggerated versions of themselves, as the press and public seemed to view them. He later explained, "the band had become such cartoon characters at that point in the way we were portrayed in the media, the idea was that we would sort of go out and pretend we were the cartoon characters." From there, a story was conceived revolving around a rock star named Zero (based on the public persona of Corgan) hearing the voice of God, renaming himself Glass, and renaming his band The Machines of God. Fans of the band were referred to as the "Ghost Children".

Billy Corgan's chart showing the loose story of Machina and Machina II

Corgan originally wanted Machina to be a double album, but Virgin Records was not interested after the disappointing sales of Adore.

== Recording ==
Much like previous albums, the songs were first tracked acoustically at Corgan's house in late 1998 before the band set to work on them at their practice space and the Chicago Recording Company. The recording was conducted with the team responsible for finishing Adore – co-producer Flood and engineers Howard Willing and Bjorn Thorsrud.

The band took a break from recording in April 1999 to embark on the Arising! tour, which took the band to nine small clubs. After the tour's conclusion, the bass guitarist, D'arcy Wretzky, left the band, leaving the rest of them in a difficult position. Corgan later said, "This put a stress obviously on the full integrity of the project, because it was connected to the band not only bringing the music to fruition fully, but also the public component of being in character. I ended up in a broken band with a half-ass enthusiasm towards finishing a project already started." In Wretzky's absence, Corgan and Iha shared bass duties for the recording of the album.

Flood later remembered, "We decided that we were going to have to make a very different kind of record [...] we pretty much went back to the drawing board. Certain songs on the record are survivors from that first period, but it meant a shift in the ways songs had to be formed."

Corgan described the new recording process for Machina, now focused more on the song development than on the concept:

We spent most of the time trying to take the songs as far as they could be taken down a particular avenue. So if it was gonna be proto-cyber metal, we tried to make it very proto and very cyber. If it was acoustic, then we tried to not fall into the typical ballad-y kind of aspects. That's where we spent most of our time. The songs were probably written in about a day.

Many of the lyrics almost certainly reflect Corgan trying to come to terms with the band ending and the need to move on. In "This Time" he whispers "This time I need to know, I really must be told, that it's over" while in "With Every Light" he sings "It's almost over, it's almost over, no more war and no more soldier" over a hazy-sounding acoustic guitar. Other songs, including "Wound", "'I of the Mourning'" and "Try, Try, Try" cover survival - likely in reference to Corgan getting over recent professional and personal crises including Jimmy Chamberlin's departure from the band and the death of his mother, Martha. Songs with lyrics inspired Corgan's original abstract concept for the album remain only in places, most notably in "Glass and The Ghost Children" and "The Everlasting Gaze". According to Corgan, the album was structured so that the first eight tracks would be "more poppy", and the last seven "more arty". Generally, Corgan appraised the sound of the album as "a rock 'n' roll approach with pop sensibility".

== Marketing and release ==
"The Everlasting Gaze"
Sample of "The Everlasting Gaze", the first single from Machina/The Machines of God (2000).

Machina was released as a single album on February 29, 2000, with a bonus disc, Still Becoming Apart, available at certain stores.

"I Of The Mourning" was a promotional single for Machina/The Machines of God.

A video was made for "Stand Inside Your Love", the planned first single, in late 1999, but at the last minute, "The Everlasting Gaze" was issued as the album's first promotional radio single in December 1999. "Stand Inside Your Love" was released as the first commercially available single on January 21, 2000. "I of the Mourning" was also released as a promotional single and received limited airplay. "Heavy Metal Machine" was issued as a promotional cassette but was not distributed to radio stations.

On March 9, the band went on the Thursday edition of @MTV Week at Broadway Studios in New York City for a half-hour live TV special. During the broadcast they performed "The Everlasting Gaze" as well as "I of the Mourning" after an online and call-in voting competition between three songs from Machina. The special also featured Carson Daly interviewing the band members and online chats with the band, and an interactive online video for "The Crying Tree of Mercury".

On May 23, Corgan announced on KROQ-FM that the band would be breaking up at the end of the year. The band reconvened in a studio to finish off the leftover Machina tracks, but Virgin remained uninterested, so the band released Machina II on their own in September, handing them off to fans to distribute free over the Internet.

The video for the final single, "Try, Try, Try", directed by Jonas Åkerlund, was released on September 11, 2000, but did not receive airplay in the US due to its graphic content.

=== Glass and The Machines of God ===
Although the full extent of the original concept went unrealized, the storyline of Glass was tied to the album's release and marketing. A sequence of writings, by Corgan, were released under the name "Glass and the Machines of God" starting in the CD booklet and continuing over the Internet and elsewhere. Corgan challenged fans to solve the "Machina mystery" hinted at through it all, and in December 2000 posted his favorite fan interpretations.

The booklet artwork, a series of paintings by Vasily Kafanov, loosely told the album's story while hinting at themes related to alchemy, chemistry, metallurgy, physics, medicine, astrology, semiotics, mysticism, spiritualism, and art. The album was nominated for a 2001 Grammy for Best Recording Package.

In June 2001, a viral marketing campaign written by Jim Evans and Ben Allgood was launched via the Smashing Pumpkins message board, encouraging users to seek out mysterious websites and video clips. This early example of an internet-based alternate reality game eventually unveiled the news of a new online animated series by Sony based on the Machina story. Due in part to the changing circumstances surrounding the album's rollout, the series was shelved before any episodes were completed, though several portions have been leaked to YouTube. In a 2010 interview, Corgan commented on the abandoned cartoon, stating, "Yeah, I think you can find a few bits and pieces, but it never got finished unfortunately. That would've at least explained what the fuck I was trying to do [laughs]. I'm not even sure now what I was trying to do. But I was trying to do something."

== Reception ==
=== Critical reception ===
Professional ratings
Aggregate scores
Source	Rating
Metacritic	66/100
Review scores
Source	Rating
AllMusic	3/5 stars
Chicago Sun-Times	3.5/4 stars
Entertainment Weekly	C+
Los Angeles Times	3/4 stars
NME	3/5 stars
Pitchfork	4.2/10
Q	4/5 stars
Rolling Stone	3.5/5 stars
Spin	7/10
The Village Voice	C+

According to Metacritic, the album received generally favorable reviews, scoring 66 out of 100 based on 15 reviews.

Jim DeRogatis of the Chicago Sun-Times called Machina "an exceedingly impressive and hard-driving record" and contended that it was the band's "masterpiece".

"Machina finds the quartet back at their grunge-rocking best", wrote Clark Collis in The Daily Telegraph. "[Corgan] seems re-energised as a writer and singer with the likes of 'Stand Inside Your Love' and 'Try Try Try' standing among their best work to date, while the lyrical refrain of the epic 'Glass and the Ghost Children' should please all those who like their rock music to be mean, moody and not a little psychotic."

In Q, Paul Elliott described it as "mostly, a wonderful rock album" that was "not without its faults". "'Heavy Metal Machine' is a hokey title for a dull rock song. 'Glass and the Ghost Children' sounds like mid-'80s U2 pretending to be The Doors... Often Corgan is at his most effective when he keeps it simple... 'With Every Light' is the gentlest song on Machina, and perhaps the best."

However, a few reviews were negative, such as NME's, who criticized the album for "[not sounding] like a band in love with the potential and power of music".

=== Commercial performance ===
Machina is the second lowest-selling commercially released Pumpkins album to date, with US sales of 583,000 units up to 2005. Although it entered the US charts at number 3, selling 165,000 copies in its first week, sales declined sixty percent the second week, and continued to slide. Regarding the disappointing sales, Jimmy Chamberlin commented, "It was like watching your kid flunking out of school after getting straight A's for ten years." Corgan, in 2008, summarized the failures of the album:

I think the combination of the band breaking up during that record, D'arcy leaving the band... Korn was huge at the time, Limp Bizkit was huge at the time, so the album wasn't heavy enough. It wasn't alternative enough, it was sort of caught between the cracks. And it was a concept record, which nobody understood. So the combination of those elements was a career-killer... Adore didn't alienate the audience, they were just sort of like, 'Oh, it's not the record I want.' [Machina] alienated people.

== 25th anniversary reissue ==
In April 2011, Corgan told Rolling Stone that Machina was scheduled to be reissued as a resequenced double album with the Machina II material (as he had originally envisioned), with a release date of 2013. The original co-producer Flood will be involved with a complete remix of all the material and sequencing into its original order as a two-disc concept album. Part of the restored concept album will be a suite simulating a live Machines of God concert, possibly with crowd noise added, with a mix inspired by Kiss' Alive!.

In July 2015, it was reported that the reissue's release was put on permanent hold due to legal troubles with the record label. Corgan has said he has spent a lot of time on this and wants it to be released, but the legal issues need to be resolved first. In August 2018, Billy answered an Instagram Q&A about this. The question was "Will the Machina reissue ever see the light of day?" He answered "Just signed legal settlement today on that. So yes". Corgan announced in later Q&As that the reissue will feature completely new artwork and will not reuse any of the original Machina artwork by Vasily Kafanov.

On January 28, 2021, NME reported that the Machina reworking was complete and Billy Corgan stated that it would contain at least 80 songs. On March 31, 2025, Corgan announced that a twenty-fifth anniversary box set edition of Machina/The Machines of God and Machina II/The Friends & Enemies of Modern Music, titled Machina: Aranea Alba Editio, would be released on August 22, 2025. As per the previous reports, it will contain 80 fully remixed and remastered songs, divided as a 48-song version of Machina and 32 b-sides, outtakes and live cuts.

== Track listing ==
All tracks are written by Billy Corgan.

No.	Title	Length
1.	"The Everlasting Gaze"	4:00
2.	"Raindrops + Sunshowers"	4:39
3.	"Stand Inside Your Love"	4:14
4.	"I of the Mourning"	4:37
5.	"The Sacred and Profane"	4:22
6.	"Try, Try, Try"	5:09
7.	"Heavy Metal Machine"	5:52
8.	"This Time"	4:43
9.	"The Imploding Voice"	4:24
10.	"Glass and the Ghost Children"	9:56
11.	"Wound"	3:58
12.	"The Crying Tree of Mercury"	3:43
13.	"With Every Light"	3:56
14.	"Blue Skies Bring Tears"	5:45
15.	"Age of Innocence"	3:55
Total length:		73:23

Vinyl
No.	Title	Length
13.	"Speed Kills" ( (Note: "Speed Kills" is a different version than the release on Machina II/The Friends & Enemies of Modern Music but the same version that appears on the "Stand Inside Your Love" single. On vinyl it is presented in its entirety; on Japan CD release, it is truncated by two minutes with a fadeout. The last four tracks are resequenced. One early release of the album often referred to as the "premaster" has an extended version of "The Sacred and Profane" with two bars of electronic drum beat at the beginning of the song, electric guitar instead of acoustic in "Age of Innocence", "The Crying Tree of Mercury" titled "The Mercury Tree", and a different, more lo-fi mix overall.))	5:21
14.	"Age of Innocence"	3:55
15.	"With Every Light"	3:56
16.	"Blue Skies Bring Tears"	5:45

Notes

All tracks are written by Billy Corgan, except where noted.

Machina Aranea Alba Edition (25th Anniversary)
No.	Title	Length
1.	"Le Deux Machina"
2.	"Stand Inside Your Love"
3.	"I of the Mourning"
4.	"God's Promise"
5.	"The Crying Tree of Mercury"
6.	"Slow Dawn"
7.	"The Sacred and Profane"
8.	"The Everlasting Gaze"
9.	"Here's to the Atom Bomb"
10.	"Wound"
11.	"Glass' Theme"
12.	"Heavy Metal Machine"
13.	"Blue Skies Wrought Tears"
14.	"Pale Scales"
15.	"Vanity"
16.	"Autumn"
17.	"Machina, Machina"
18.	"Raindrops + Sunshowers"
19.	"Glass and the Ghost Children"
20.	"Real Love"
21.	"The Imploding Voice"
22.	"One Moment"
23.	"Speed Kills"
24.	"Here's to the Atom Bomb, Too"
25.	"Try, Try, Try"
26.	"Whyte Spyder"
27.	"Don't Wanna Be Your Lover"
28.	"Cash Car Star"
29.	"Dross"
30.	"Lucky 13"
31.	"HMM"
32.	"Without You"
33.	"Winterlong"
34.	"Laugh"
35.	"If There Is a God"
36.	"This Time"
37.	"Blue Skies Bring Tears"
38.	"In My Body"
39.	"Innosense"
40.	"Try (Again)"
41.	"Drain"
42.	"Yet Another Promise"
43.	"Home"
44.	"With Every Light"
45.	"Age of Innocence"
46.	"Let Me Give the World to You"
47.	"Soot + Stars"
48.	"Machina Theme"

Bonus tracks
No.	Title	Writer(s)	Length
49.	"Untitled"
50.	"Blue Skies Bring Tears" (Early version)
51.	"Go" (Machina II version)	James Iha
52.	"Vanity" (Sadlands demo)
53.	"Raindrops + Sunshowers" (Band demo)
54.	"Soul Power" (Machina II version)	James Brown
55.	"Here I Am" (Sadlands demo)
56.	"The Crying Tree"
57.	"Glass and the Ghost Children" (Pumpkinland demo)
58.	"Age of Innocence" (Acoustic demo)
59.	"Rock On"	David Essex
60.	"End of the Joke"
61.	"Stand Inside Your Love" (Early version)
62.	"Home" (Home demo)
63.	"Identify" (Movie demo)	Corgan; Mike Garson
64.	"Rainy Day Song"	Iha
65.	"Lucky 13" (Machina II version)
66.	"Satur9" (Machina II version)
67.	"The Imploding Voice" (Pumpkinland demo)
68.	"Without You" (Sadlands demo)
69.	"Wound" (Sadlands demo)
70.	"Speed Kills" (Early version)
71.	"Whyte Spyder" (Machina II version)
72.	"Summer" (Rehearsal)	Iha
73.	"Let Me Give the World to You" (Sadlands demo)
74.	"Heavy Metal Machine" (Machina II version)
75.	"I of the Radio" (Instrumental demo)
76.	"Sleeping Giant"
77.	"Attached By Satellites" (Sadlands demo)
78.	"Glass' Theme" (Machina II demo)
79.	"Promise" (NYC demo)
80.	"Fuck You (An Ode to No One)" (Live 12.02.00)

== Personnel ==
The Smashing Pumpkins

- Billy Corgan – vocals, guitar, bass guitar, keyboards, piano, production, art direction, mixing
- James Iha – guitar, bass guitar
- D'arcy Wretzky – bass guitar
- Jimmy Chamberlin – drums

Additional musicians

- Mike Garson – piano on "With Every Light"

Production

- Bill Douglass – mixing assistance
- Flood – production, mixing
- Vasily Kafanov – sleeve paintings and etchings
- Tommy Lipnick – technical assistance
- Tim "Gooch" Lougee – technical assistance
- Jef Moll – mixing assistance
- Alan Moulder – mixing
- Andrew Nicholls – mixing assistance
- Erin Piepergerdes – mixing assistance
- Scott Schimpff – technical assistance
- Greg Sylvester – art direction
- Bjorn Thorsrud – recording, mixing, digital editing, compilation, additional programming
- Howie Weinberg – mastering
- Howard C. Willing – recording, mixing
- Thomas Wolfe – art direction
- Yelena Yemchuk – art direction
- Mike Zainer – mixing assistant

== Charts ==
=== Weekly charts ===
2000 weekly chart performance for Machina/The Machines of God
Chart (2000)	Peak position
Australian Albums (ARIA)	2
Austrian Albums (Ö3 Austria)	10
Belgian Albums (Ultratop Flanders)	4
Belgian Albums (Ultratop Wallonia)	8
Canadian Albums (Billboard)	2
Danish Albums (Hitlisten)	16
Dutch Albums (Album Top 100)	15
Finnish Albums (Suomen virallinen lista)	6
French Albums (SNEP)	4
German Albums (Offizielle Top 100)	4
Irish Albums (IRMA)	3
Italian Albums (FIMI)	2
New Zealand Albums (RMNZ)	4
Norwegian Albums (VG-lista)	2
Scottish Albums (Official Charts)	8
Spanish Albums (AFYVE)	10
Swedish Albums (Sverigetopplistan)	3
Swiss Albums (Schweizer Hitparade)	12
UK Albums (Official Charts)	7
US Billboard 200	3

2025 weekly chart performance for Machina/The Machines of God
Chart (2025)	Peak position
German Rock & Metal Albums (Offizielle Top 100)	8

=== Year-end charts ===
Year-end chart performance for Machine/The Machines of God
Chart (2000)	Position
Canadian Albums (Nielsen SoundScan)	122
US Billboard 200	197

== Certifications ==
Certifications and sales for Machina/The Machines of God
Region	Certification	Certified units/sales
Australia (ARIA)	Gold	35,000^{^}
Canada (Music Canada)	Platinum	100,000^{^}
France (SNEP)	Gold	100,000^{*}
Japan (RIAJ)	Gold	100,000^{^}
New Zealand (RMNZ)	Gold	7,500^{^}
United Kingdom (BPI)	Silver	60,000^{^}
United States (RIAA)	Gold	500,000^{^}
^{*} Sales figures based on certification alone.^{^} Shipments figures based on certification alone.
