= List of Skid Row members =

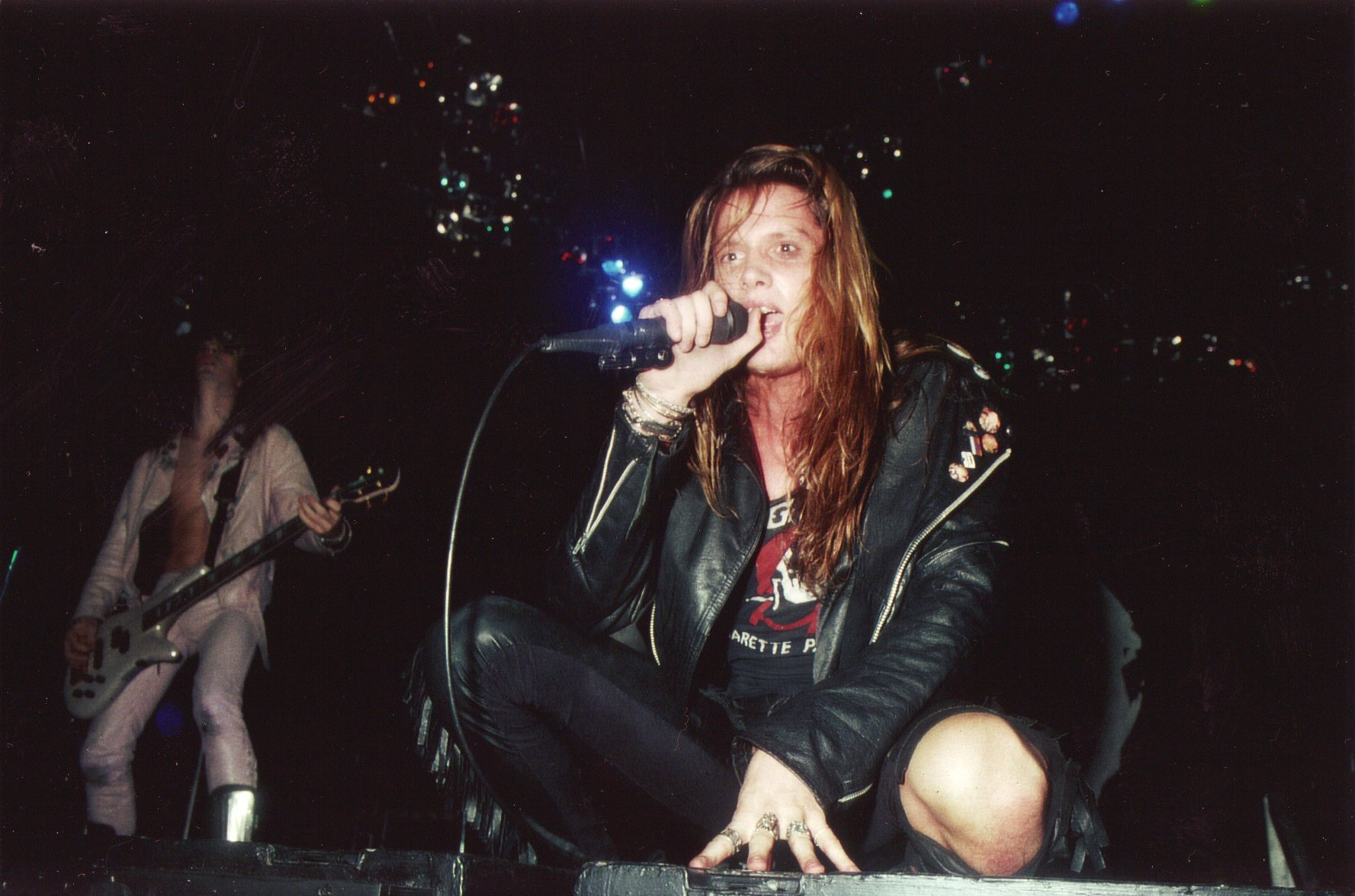
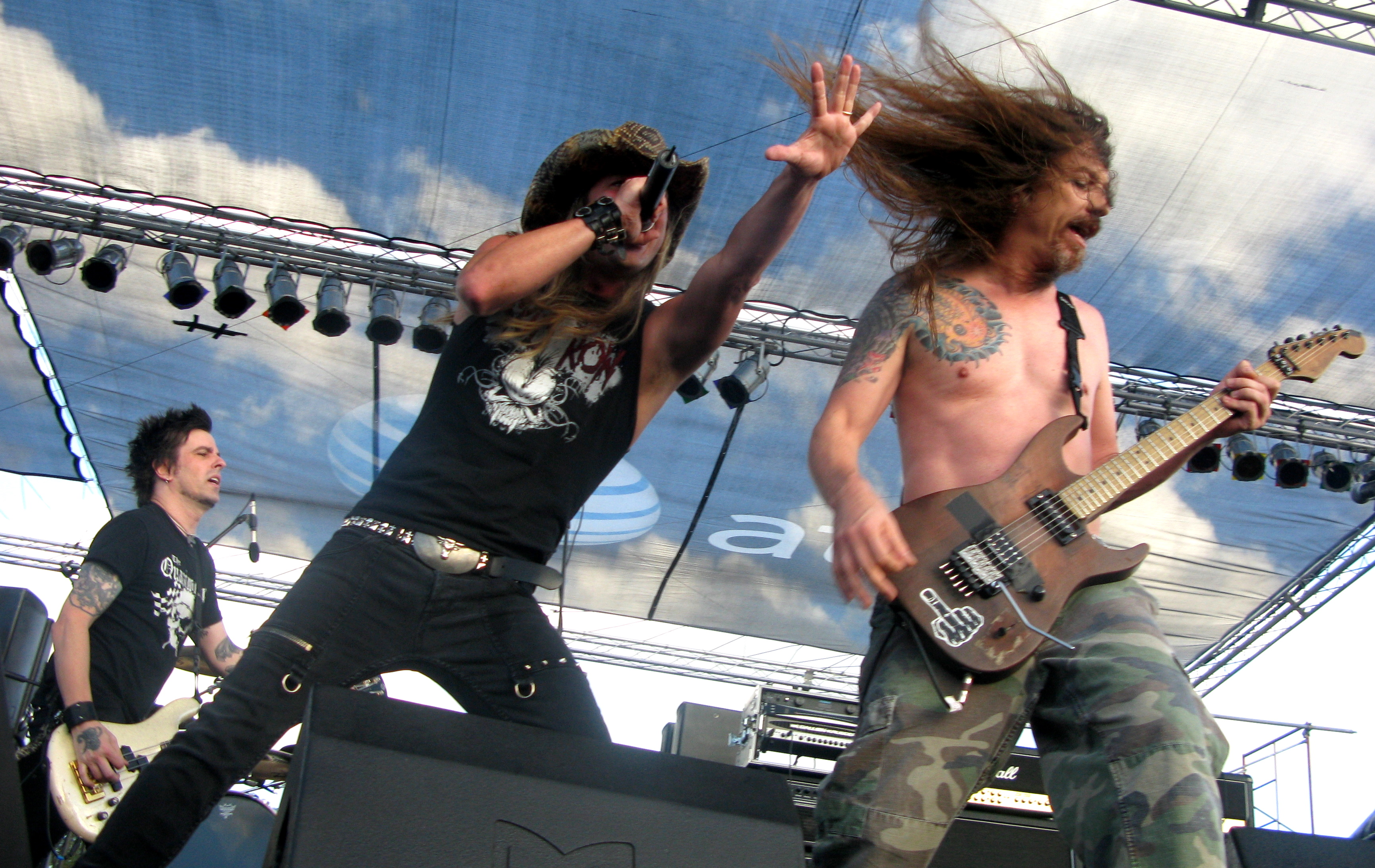
Two lineups of Skid Row performing live in 1989 (top) and 2008 (bottom)

Skid Row is an American heavy metal band from Toms River, New Jersey. Formed in 1986, the group originally included guitarist Dave "The Snake" Sabo, lead vocalist Matt Fallon, drummer John Ratkowski Jr., bassist Rachel Bolan and guitarist Steve Brotherton (soon replaced by Kurtis Jackson, in turn replaced by Jim Yuhas).

By March 1987, the lineup had changed to feature Scotti Hill in place of Yuhas and Rob Affuso in place of Ratkowski. Fallon was replaced by Sebastian Bach on June 13, 1987.

After releasing three studio albums together, Skid Row began an unofficial hiatus in August 1996. Bach left the band in December, claiming that Sabo and Bolan had fired him. The group's remaining members formed Ozone Monday with vocalist Shawn McCabe in 1998.

In January 1999, Sabo, Bolan and Hill reformed Skid Row, adding new lead vocalist Johnny Solinger and drummer Charlie Mills. In July 2000, it was announced that Phil Varone had replaced Mills, who was forced to leave the band due to "lack of income". The new drummer performed on the group's first studio album in over eight years, 2003's Thickskin, but in January 2004 left "abruptly" due to "personal reasons", with Timothy DiDuro taking his place. Varone had rejoined by March, but within two months had left again, with Dave Gara joining as his replacement. Gara remained in the band until April 2010, with Rob Hammersmith taking his place in May.

After more than 15 years with the band, Solinger left Skid Row in April 2015, reportedly in order to focus on his solo career. Sabo and Bolan later disputed that Solinger had left the band of his own accord, claiming that they had instead fired him. Despite rumours of a reunion with Bach, Solinger was replaced by former TNT frontman Tony Harnell. His tenure was short-lived, however, and by the end of the year he had departed after claiming that the other band members "ignored and disrespected" him. Early the following year, Skid Row began touring with former DragonForce frontman ZP Theart, who was made an official member of the band in January 2017. Theart remained until March 2022, when he was replaced by Erik Grönwall.

Grönwall left in March 2024, due to health issues. His temporary replacement was Lzzy Hale of Halestorm.

In October 2026, singer Justin Sargent joined Skid Row after over two years of band inactivity.

== Members ==
=== Current ===
Image	Name	Years active	Instruments	Release contributions
	Dave "The Snake" Sabo	1986–1996, 1999–present	guitar; backing vocals	all Skid Row releases
	Rachel Bolan	1986–1996, 1999–present	bass; backing vocals	all Skid Row releases
	Scotti Hill	1987–1996, 1999–present	guitar; backing vocals	all Skid Row releases
	Rob Hammersmith	2010–present	drums; backing vocals	all Skid Row releases from United World Rebellion: Chapter One (2013) onwards
	Justin Sargent	2026–present	lead vocals	none

=== Former ===
Image	Name	Years active	Instruments	Release contributions
	Matt Fallon	1986–1987	lead vocals	none, except early demo recordings
	John Ratkowski Jr.	1986–1987	drums	none, except early demo recordings
	Cody Howell	1986	bass	none
	Steve Brotherton	1986	guitar	none
	Kurtis Jackson	1986	guitar	none
	Jim Yuhas	1986–1987	guitar	none
	Rob Affuso	1987–1996	drums	all Skid Row releases from Skid Row (1989) to Subhuman Beings on Tour (1995), 40 Seasons: The Best of Skid Row (1998)
	Sebastian Bach	1987–1996	lead vocals	all Skid Row releases from Skid Row (1989) to Subhuman Beings on Tour (1995), 40 Seasons: The Best of Skid Row (1998)
	Johnny Solinger	1999–2015 (died 2021)	lead vocals	all Skid Row releases from Thickskin (2003) to United World Rebellion: Chapter Two (2014)
	Charlie Mills	1999–2000	drums	none
	Phil Varone	2000–2004	drums	Thickskin (2003)
	Timothy DiDuro	2004	drums	none
	Dave Gara	2004–2010	drums	Revolutions per Minute (2006)
	Tony Harnell	2015	lead vocals	"18 and Life" (2015)
	ZP Theart	2016–2022	lead vocals	none
	Erik Grönwall	2022–2024	lead vocals	The Gang's All Here (2022)

=== Former touring musicians ===
Image	Name	Years active	Instruments	Release contributions
	Rob Halford	1993; 1995	vocals	Judas Priest singer sang on "Delivering the Goods" from B-Side Ourselves (1992), and guested with the band on the Subhuman Beings on Tour.
	Rick Marty	1994	guitar	none
	Keri Kelli	2005; 2008	guitar	none
	Ryan Cook	2007; 2012	guitar	none
	Alex Grossi	2008	guitar	none
	Johny Dey	2015	guitar	none
	Ryan Cook	2019	guitar	none
	Casey Sproatt	2022; 2023	guitar (2022); bass (2023)	none
	Lzzy Hale	2024	vocals	none

== Lineups ==
Period	Members	Releases
Early 1986	Matt Fallon – lead vocals; Dave Sabo – guitar, backing vocals; Steve Brotherton – guitar; Cody Howell – bass guitar; John Ratkowski Jr. – drums	none
Early 1986	Matt Fallon – lead vocals; Dave Sabo – guitar, backing vocals; Steve Brotherton – guitar; Rachel Bolan – bass guitar, backing vocals; John Ratkowski Jr. – drums	self-titled demo (1986)
1986	Matt Fallon – lead vocals; Dave Sabo – guitar, backing vocals; Kurtis Jackson – guitar; Rachel Bolan – bass guitar, backing vocals; John Ratkowski Jr. – drums	none
1986 — February 1987	Matt Fallon – lead vocals; Dave Sabo – guitar, backing vocals; Jim Yuhas – guitar; Rachel Bolan – bass guitar, backing vocals; John Ratkowski Jr. – drums	none
March – June 1987	Matt Fallon – lead vocals; Scotti Hill – guitar, backing vocals; Dave Sabo – guitar, backing vocals; Rachel Bolan – bass guitar, backing vocals; Rob Affuso – drums	none
June 1987 – August 1996	Sebastian Bach – lead vocals; Scotti Hill – guitar, backing vocals; Dave Sabo – guitar, backing vocals; Rachel Bolan – bass guitar, backing vocals; Rob Affuso — drums	Skid Row (1989); Oh Say Can You Scream (1990); Slave to the Grind (1991); B-Side Ourselves (1992); Road Kill (1993); No Frills Video (1993); Subhuman Race (1995); Subhuman Beings on Tour (1995); 40 Seasons: The Best of Skid Row (1998)
Band inactive August 1996 – January 1999
January 1999 – July 2000	Johnny Solinger – lead vocals; Scotti Hill – guitar, backing vocals; Dave Sabo – guitar, backing vocals; Rachel Bolan – bass guitar, backing vocals; Charlie Mills – drums	none
July 2000 – January 2004	Johnny Solinger – lead vocals; Scotti Hill – guitar, backing vocals; Dave Sabo – guitar, backing vocals; Rachel Bolan – bass guitar, backing vocals; Phil Varone – drums, backing vocals	Thickskin (2003)
January – March 2004	Johnny Solinger – lead vocals; Scotti Hill – guitar, backing vocals; Dave Sabo – guitar, backing vocals; Rachel Bolan – bass guitar, backing vocals; Timothy DiDuro – drums	none
March – May 2004	Johnny Solinger – lead vocals; Scotti Hill – guitar, backing vocals; Dave Sabo – guitar, backing vocals; Rachel Bolan – bass guitar, backing vocals; Phil Varone – drums, backing vocals	none
May 2004 – April 2010	Johnny Solinger – lead vocals; Scotti Hill – guitar, backing vocals; Dave Sabo – guitar, backing vocals; Rachel Bolan – bass guitar, backing vocals; Dave Gara – drums, backing vocals	Revolutions per Minute (2006)
May 2010 – April 2015	Johnny Solinger – lead vocals; Scotti Hill – guitar, backing vocals; Dave Sabo – guitar, backing vocals; Rachel Bolan – bass guitar, backing vocals; Rob Hammersmith – drums, backing vocals	United World Rebellion: Chapter One (2013); United World Rebellion: Chapter Two (2014)
April – December 2015	Tony Harnell – lead vocals; Scotti Hill – guitar, backing vocals; Dave Sabo – guitar, backing vocals; Rachel Bolan – bass guitar, backing vocals; Rob Hammersmith – drums, backing vocals	"18 and Life" (2015)
February 2016 – March 2022	ZP Theart – lead vocals; Scotti Hill – guitar, backing vocals; Dave Sabo – guitar, backing vocals; Rachel Bolan – bass guitar, backing vocals; Rob Hammersmith – drums, backing vocals	none
March 2022 – March 2024	Erik Grönwall – lead vocals; Scotti Hill – guitar, backing vocals; Dave Sabo – guitar, backing vocals; Rachel Bolan – bass guitar, backing vocals; Rob Hammersmith – drums, backing vocals	The Gang's All Here (2022)
March 2024 – June 2024	Scotti Hill – guitar, backing vocals; Dave Sabo – guitar, backing vocals; Rachel Bolan – bass guitar, backing vocals; Rob Hammersmith – drums, backing vocals; Lzzy Hale - lead vocals (touring)	none
June 2024 – present	Scotti Hill – guitar, backing vocals; Dave Sabo – guitar, backing vocals; Rachel Bolan – bass guitar, backing vocals; Rob Hammersmith – drums, backing vocals	none
