= Skid Row (American band) discography =

Discography of American rock band Skid Row

Skid Row discography
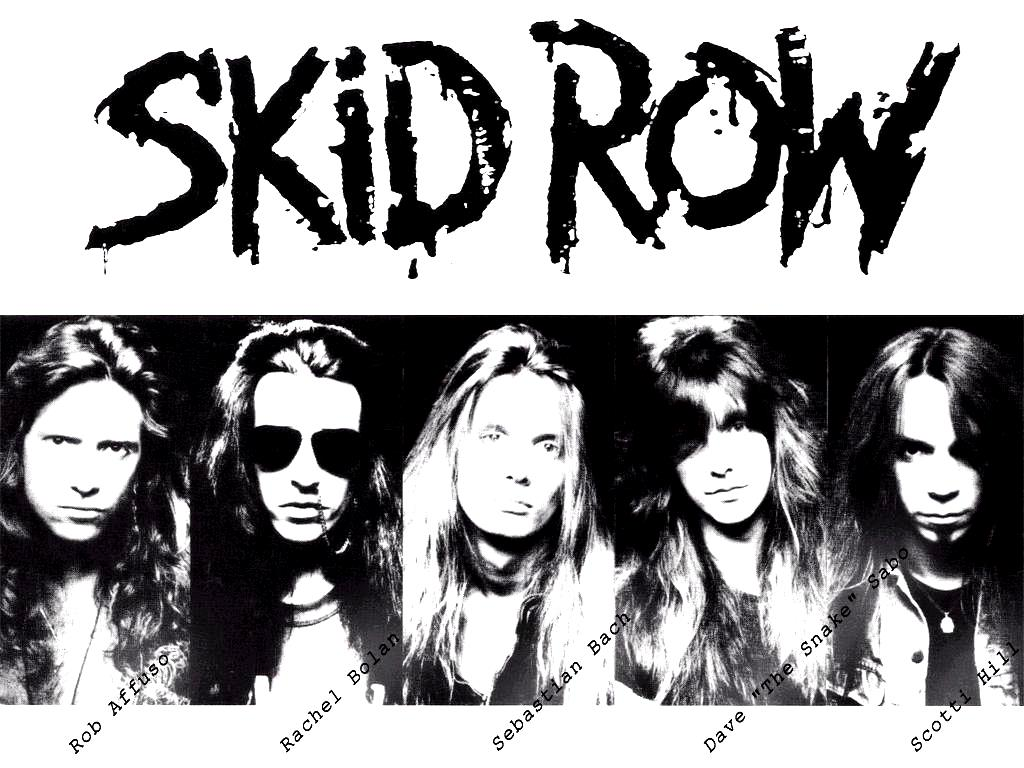
- Classic lineup of Skid Row (1987–1996)
- Studio albums: 6
- Extended plays: 4
- Live albums: 1
- Compilation albums: 1
- Singles: 30
- Video albums: 5
- Music videos: 27

The discography of Skid Row, an American heavy metal band, consists of six studio albums, four EPs, and one compilation album.

Skid Row was formed in 1986 in Toms River, New Jersey. They were most successful in the late 1980s and early '90s when their first two albums with lead singer Sebastian Bach and drummer Rob Affuso were multi-platinum successes. Their current line-up consists of Dave "The Snake" Sabo, Scotti Hill (guitar), Rachel Bolan (bass), and Rob Hammersmith (drums). As of the end of 1996, the band has sold over 20 million albums worldwide.

== Albums ==
=== Studio albums ===
Year	Album details	Peak chart positions												Certifications (sales threshold)
Year	Album details	US	AUS	AUT	CAN	GER	JPN	NL	NOR	NZ	SWE	SWI	UK	Certifications (sales threshold)
1989	Skid Row: Release date: January 24, 1989; Label: Atlantic	6	12	—	11	22	35	—	—	1	21	26	30	US: 5× Platinum; AUS: Platinum; CAN: 3× Platinum; UK: Gold
1991	Slave to the Grind: Released: June 11, 1991; Label: Atlantic	1	3	16	8	12	3	—	12	8	9	15	5	US: 2× Platinum; AUS: Gold; CAN: Platinum; UK: Silver
1995	Subhuman Race: Release date: March 28, 1995; Label: Atlantic	35	5	—	31	57	6	84	—	—	21	49	8	
2003	Thickskin: Release date: August 5, 2003; Label: SPV	—	—	—	—	—	111	—	—	—	—	—	—	
2006	Revolutions per Minute: Release date: October 24, 2006; Label: SPV	—	—	—	—	—	—	—	—	—	—	—	—	
2022	The Gang's All Here: Release date: October 14, 2022; Label: earMUSIC	—	94	28	—	15	30	—	—	—	33	5	67	
"—" denotes releases that did not chart

=== Compilation albums ===
Year	Album details	Peak positions
Year	Album details	UK Rock
1998	40 Seasons: The Best of Skid Row: Release date: November 3, 1998; Label: Atlantic	23

=== Live albums ===
Year	Album details	Peak positions
Year	Album details	UK Rock
2024	Live in London: Release date: September 20, 2024; Label: earMUSIC	34

== Box Sets ==
Year	Details
2021	The Atlantic Years (1989 – 1996): Release date: December 3, 2021; Label: Atlantic

== Extended plays ==
Year	EP details	Peak positions				Certifications (sales threshold)
Year	EP details	US	AUS	SWE	JPN	Certifications (sales threshold)
1992	B-Side Ourselves: Release date: September 22, 1992; Label: Atlantic	58	51	48	15	US: Gold
1995	Subhuman Beings on Tour: Release date: 1995; Label: East West	—	—	—	—	
2013	United World Rebellion: Chapter One: Release date: April 16, 2013; Label: Megaforce	—	—	—	—	
2014	United World Rebellion: Chapter Two: Release date: August 5, 2014; Label: Megaforce	—	—	—	—	

== Singles ==
Year	Title	Peak chart positions								Certifications (sales threshold)	Album
Year	Title	US	US Main Rock	CAN	AUS	NZ	SWI	SWE	UK	Certifications (sales threshold)	Album
1989	"Youth Gone Wild"	99	27	—	148	—	—	—	42		Skid Row
1989	"18 and Life"	4	11	6	126	50	—	17	12	US: Gold	Skid Row
1989	"I Remember You"	6	23	14	12	2	—	—	36	AUS: Gold	Skid Row
1989	"Piece of Me" (promo)	—	—	—	—	—	—	—	—		Skid Row
1989	"Sweet Little Sister” (promo)	—	—	—	—	—	—	—	—		Skid Row
1991	"Monkey Business"	—	13	59	31	21	—	—	19		Slave to the Grind
1991	"Slave to the Grind"	—	—	—	—	—	—	—	43		Slave to the Grind
1991	"Wasted Time"	88	30	—	—	—	—	—	20		Slave to the Grind
1991	"In a Darkened Room"	—	—	—	—	—	27	—	—		Slave to the Grind
1992	"Quicksand Jesus"	—	—	—	—	—	—	—	—		Slave to the Grind
1992	"Youth Gone Wild / Delivering the Goods"	—	—	—	—	—	—	—	22		B-Side Ourselves
1992	"Little Wing" (promo)	—	—	—	—	—	—	—	—		B-Side Ourselves
1993	"C'mon and Love Me" (promo)	—	—	—	—	—	—	—	—		B-Side Ourselves
1995	"My Enemy"	—	—	—	—	—	—	—	—		Subhuman Race
1995	"Breakin' Down"	—	—	—	—	—	—	—	48		Subhuman Race
1995	"Into Another"	—	28	—	—	—	—	—	—		Subhuman Race
2003	"Ghost"	—	—	—	—	—	—	—	—		Thickskin
2003	"New Generation"	—	—	—	—	—	—	—	—		Thickskin
2003	"I Remember You Two"	—	—	—	—	—	—	—	—		Thickskin
2003	"Thick is the Skin"	—	—	—	—	—	—	—	—		Thickskin
2006	"Shut Up Baby, I Love You"	—	—	—	—	—	—	—	—		Revolutions per Minute
2006	"Strength"	—	—	—	—	—	—	—	—		Revolutions per Minute
2006	"Nothing"	—	—	—	—	—	—	—	—		Revolutions per Minute
2013	"Kings of Demolition"	—	—	—	—	—	—	—	—		United World Rebellion: Chapter One
2013	"This Is Killing Me"	—	—	—	—	—	—	—	—		United World Rebellion: Chapter One
2014	"We Are The Damned"	—	—	—	—	—	—	—	—		United World Rebellion: Chapter Two
2015	"18 and Life (2015)"	—	—	—	—	—	—	—	—		Re-recorded 2015 single
2022	"The Gang's All Here"	—	—	—	—	—	—	—	—		The Gang's All Here
2022	"Tear It Down"	—	—	—	—	—	—	—	—		The Gang's All Here
2022	"Time Bomb"	—	—	—	—	—	—	—	—		The Gang's All Here
2022	"October's Song"	—	—	—	—	—	—	—	—		The Gang's All Here
2023	"Resurrected"	—	—	—	—	—	—	—	—		The Gang's All Here
2024	"Slave to the Grind (Live)"	—	—	—	—	—	—	—	—		Live in London
2024	"Piece of Me (Live)"	—	—	—	—	—	—	—	—		Live in London
"—" denotes releases that did not chart or were not released

== Videography ==
=== Video albums ===
Year	Album details	Certifications (sales threshold)
1990	Oh Say Can You Scream: Release date: December 4, 1990; Label: Atlantic Records	US: Platinum
1993	Road Kill: Release date: October 16, 1993; Label: Atlantic Records	
1993	No Frills Video: Release date: November 2, 1993; Label: Atlantic Records	
2003	Under the Skin: Release date: 2003	
2024	Live in London: Release date: 2024	

=== Music videos ===
Year	Song
1989	"Youth Gone Wild"
1989	"18 and Life"
1989	"I Remember You"
1989	"Piece of Me"
1990	"Big Guns"
1991	"Monkey Business"
1991	"Slave to the Grind"
1991	"Wasted Time"
1992	"In a Darkened Room"
1992	"Quicksand Jesus"
1992	"Psycho Love"
1993	"Little Wing"
1993	"C'Mon and Love Me"
1993	"Psychotherapy"
1995	"My Enemy"
1995	"Breakin' Down"
1995	"Into Another"
2003	"Ghost"
2003	"New Generation"
2003	"Thick Is the Skin"
2003	"One Light"
2013	"Kings of Demolition"
2013	"This Is Killing Me"
2014	"We Are the Damned"
2022	"The Gang’s All Here"
2022	"Tear It Down"
2022	"Time Bomb"
2022	"October's Song"
2023	"Resurrected"
2024	"Slave to the Grind (Live)
2024	"Piece of Me (Live)"
