= Oh Say Can You Scream =

Video by Skid Row
- Released: December 4, 1990
- Genre: Heavy metal
- Length: 100 mins
- Label: Atlantic Records
- Director: Jean Pellerin

Professional ratings
Review scores
Source	Rating
Allmusic	2.5/5 stars

Oh Say Can You Scream is a VHS video of live performances by Skid Row featuring songs from the band's self-titled debut album. It was released on December 4, 1990. Running time is 100 minutes. The video includes 12 live performances from all over the world plus behind the scenes footage and uncensored video clips of "18 and Life", "Youth Gone Wild", "I Remember You", and "Piece of Me".

== Track listing ==
1. "Big Guns" (Rob Affuso, Rachel Bolan, Scotti Hill, Dave "The Snake" Sabo)
2. "Makin' a Mess" (Sebastian Bach, Bolan, Sabo)
3. "Rattlesnake Shake" (Bolan, Sabo)
4. "Piece of Me" (Bolan)
5. "Sweet Little Sister" (Bolan, Sabo)
6. "I Remember You" (Bolan, Sabo)
7. "Cold Gin" (Ace Frehley)
8. "Here I Am" (Bolan, Sabo)
9. "Holidays in the Sun" (Paul Cook, Steve Jones, Glen Matlock, Johnny Rotten)
10. "Train Kept A-Rollin'" (Tiny Bradshaw, Howard Kay, Lois Mann)
11. "Blitzkrieg Bop" (Dee Dee Ramone, Tommy Ramone)
12. "Youth Gone Wild" (Bolan, Sabo)

Promo videos

1. "Youth Gone Wild"
2. "Piece of Me (Uncut Version)"
3. "18 and Life (Uncut Version)"
4. "I Remember You"

== Certifications ==
Region	Certification	Certified units/sales
Australia (ARIA)	Gold	7,500^{^}
United States (RIAA)	Platinum	100,000^{^}
^{^} Shipments figures based on certification alone.
