= I Remember You (Skid Row song) =

1989 single by Skid Row

Single by Skid Row

from the album Skid Row
- B-side: "Makin' a Mess"; "Big Guns" (live)
- Released: November 18, 1989
- Genre: Glam metal
- Length: 5:14
- Label: Atlantic
- Songwriters: Rachel Bolan; Dave Sabo
- Producer: Michael Wagener

Skid Row singles chronology
"18 and Life" (1989)	"I Remember You" (1989)	"Monkey Business" (1991)

"I Remember You" is a song by American heavy metal band Skid Row. It was released on November 18, 1989, as the third single from their eponymous debut album. Composed as a yearning power ballad about a lost love, it was written by bandmates Rachel Bolan and Dave "the Snake" Sabo. It reached number six on the US Billboard Hot 100 and number 23 on the Billboard Album Rock Tracks in early 1990. The song also charted at number two in New Zealand and entered the top 20 in Australia, Canada, Finland, and Ireland.

In 2003, Skid Row, this time featuring new lead singer Johnny Solinger, recorded a second version of the song entitled "I Remember You Two." The song appears in the album Thickskin.

== Background ==
Bassist Rachel Bolan said, "'I Remember You' was just that one thing that kind of came out the way it did, and it was something that wasn't planned. It was a cool chord progression that Snake had, and I wrote some lyrics, and we worked on it."

Before releasing it on their debut album in 1989, Skid Row performed the song in numerous small clubs and bars, and the ballad was popular with women. However, Skid Row did not want to be known as a "chick band", and Bolan and guitarist Snake hesitated to include the song on the album. However, singer Sebastian Bach and the record label saw the potential in the song, and persuaded the addition of the track.

== Reception ==
The song was described by Ultimate Classic Rock as an "explosive power ballad". In a 2007 interview, vocalist Sebastian Bach commented, "'I Remember You' was the number-one prom song in the United States of America in the year 1990....You talk about making memories! Literally the whole country of America did their prom dance to 'I Remember You' one year, and that's a real heavy memory to beat."

== Track listings ==
7-inch and cassette single

1. "I Remember You" – 5:10
2. "Makin' a Mess" – 3:38

UK 12-inch single and European maxi-CD single

A1. "I Remember You"
B1. "Makin' a Mess"
B2. "Big Guns" (live)

== Personnel ==
- Sebastian Bach – vocals
- Dave Sabo – guitars
- Scotti Hill – guitars
- Rachel Bolan – bass
- Rob Affuso – drums

== Charts ==
=== Weekly charts ===
Chart (1989–1990)	Peak position
Australia (ARIA)	12
Canada Top Singles (RPM)	14
Europe (Eurochart Hot 100)	87
Finland (Suomen virallinen lista)	18
Ireland (IRMA)	12
New Zealand (Recorded Music NZ)	2
UK Singles (Official Charts)	36
US Billboard Hot 100	6
US Mainstream Rock (Billboard)	23

=== Year-end charts ===
Chart (1990)	Position
Australia (ARIA)	57
New Zealand (RIANZ)	33
US Billboard Hot 100	72

== Certifications ==
Region	Certification	Certified units/sales
Australia (ARIA)	Gold	35,000^{^}
^{^} Shipments figures based on certification alone.

== Release history ==
Region	Date	Format(s)	Label(s)	Ref.
United States	November 18, 1989	—N/a	Atlantic	
Japan	January 1, 1990	Mini-CD	Atlantic	
Australia	February 26, 1990	7-inch vinyl; cassette	Atlantic	
United Kingdom	March 19, 1990	7-inch vinyl; 12-inch vinyl; CD	Atlantic	
United Kingdom	April 9, 1990	Special 7-inch vinyl; special 12-inch vinyl; cassette	Atlantic	
Australia	April 30, 1990	12-inch vinyl	Atlantic	

== In popular culture ==
The song appears in the film adaptation of Rock of Ages, when Drew (Diego Boneta) and Sherrie (Julianne Hough) are in Tower Records at the beginning of the film. The song also appears in the episode of South Park called "Guitar Queer-O", where Stan Marsh visits Kyle Broflovski after having a fight. The fictional group Queens of Dogtown covered the song in the fourth season of Californication.

The song appears in the beginning of the 2025 film A Minecraft Movie, when we are introduced to Garrett "The Garbage Man" Garrison (Jason Momoa).
