= Skid Row discography =

Skid Row is the name of two rock bands; for their discographies see:

- Skid Row (American band) discography
- Skid Row (Irish band) discography
