= Johnny Solinger =

American singer (1965–2021)

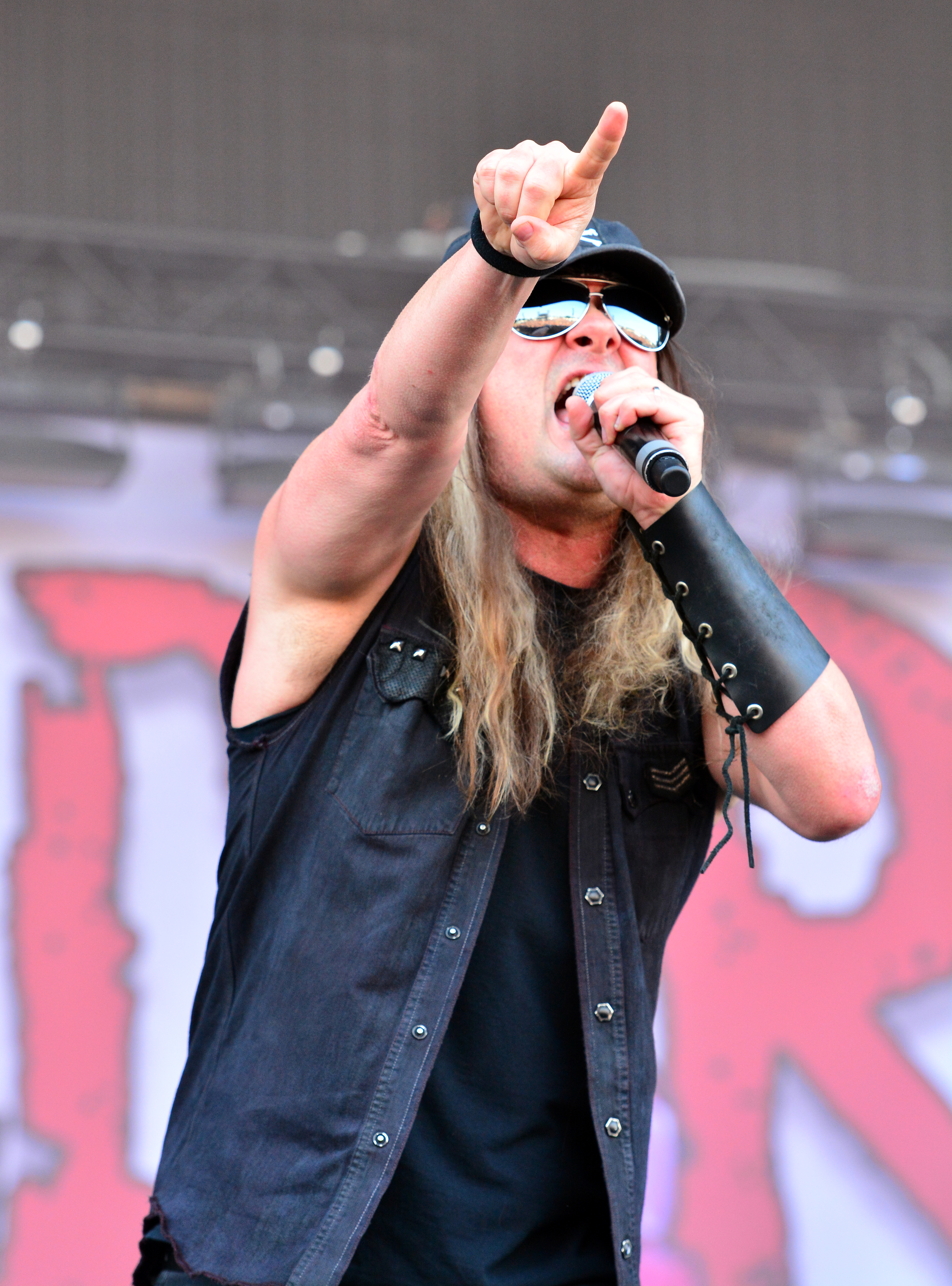
- Solinger at Wacken Open Air 2014

Background information
- Born: John Preston Solinger; August 7, 1965; Dallas, Texas, U.S.
- Died: June 26, 2021 (aged 55)
- Genres: Hard rock, heavy metal, alternative rock, country
- Occupation: Singer
- Years active: 1990–2021
- Formerly of: Solinger; Skid Row
- Website: johnnysolinger.com

John Preston Solinger (August 7, 1965 – June 26, 2021) was an American singer known for being the lead vocalist of the hard rock/heavy metal band Skid Row from 1999 to 2015.

== Career ==
=== Solinger ===
Johnny Solinger moved to the Dallas–Fort Worth area as a young boy, where he was exposed to hard rock and country music, and fell in love with them. In 1990, he formed the rock band Solinger in Dallas, recording four independent records: Solinger, Solinger II, Chain Link Fence, and Solinger Live. He enjoyed live performance and radio success throughout the Southwest.

=== Skid Row ===
In 1999, Skid Row members Dave "The Snake" Sabo, Rachel Bolan, and Scotti Hill hired Solinger to replace previous lead vocalist Sebastian Bach. In 2000, Skid Row was the opening band on Kiss's "Farewell Tour."

With over 15 years in the band, he was their longest-serving vocalist, and performed on the studio albums Thickskin (2003) and Revolutions Per Minute (2006), along with Chapters 1 and 2 of the United World Rebellion EP trilogy.

In April 2015, Solinger was fired from Skid Row, and was briefly replaced by Tony Harnell, who was eventually replaced by ZP Theart.

=== Solo career ===
In 2008, Solinger pursued a country music solo career. His first country album was only released regionally and is filled with both country and rock. The album includes the song "You Lie", which he recorded with his bandmates from Skid Row.

== Death ==
Solinger died on June 26, 2021, one month after he revealed that he was suffering from liver failure. He was 55 years old.

== Discography ==
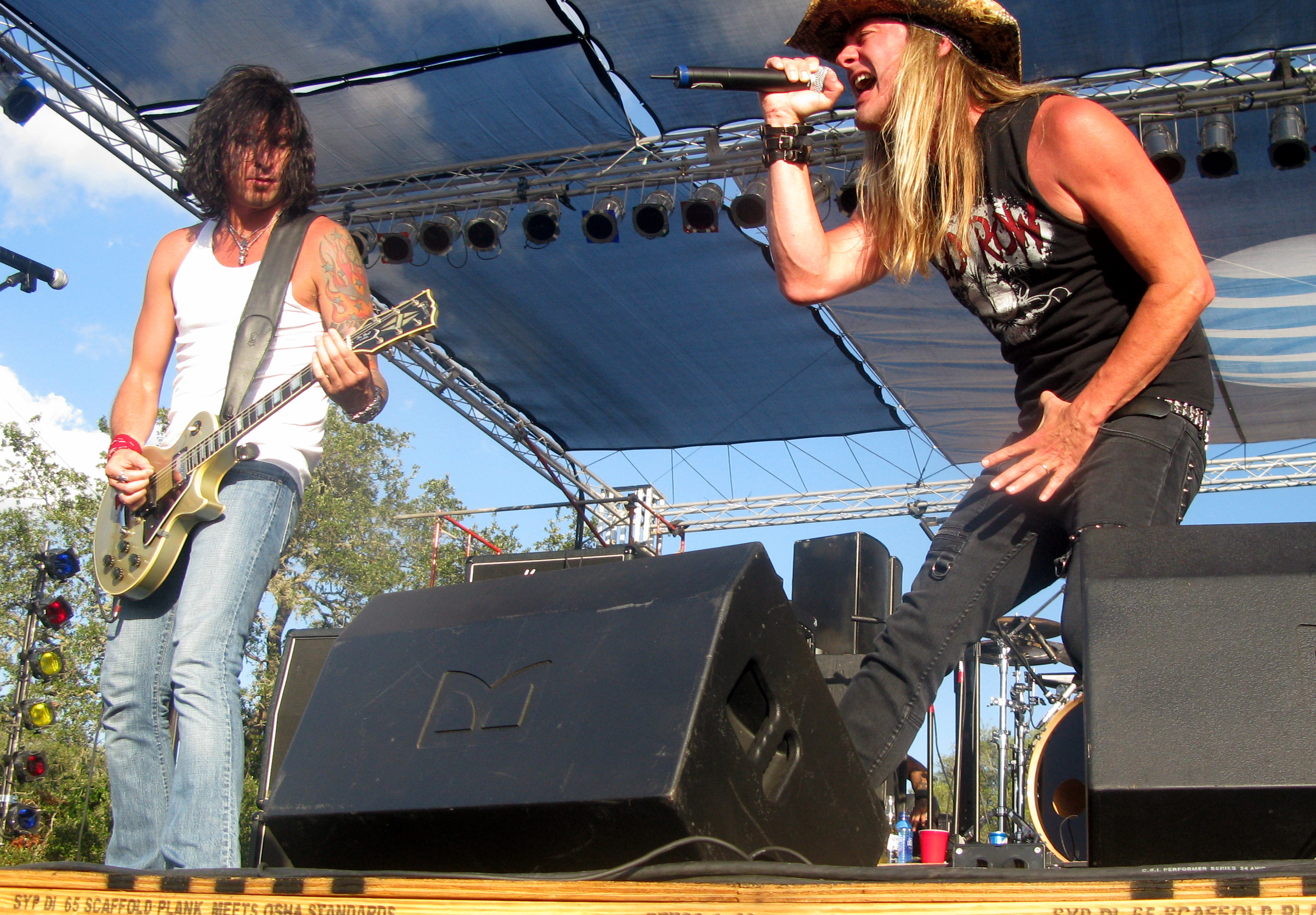
Solinger (right) performing with Skid Row in 2008

=== With Skid Row ===
- Thickskin (2003)
- Revolutions Per Minute (2006)
- United World Rebellion: Chapter One (2013)
- Rise of the Damnation Army – United World Rebellion: Chapter Two (2014)

=== Solo ===
- Chain Link Fence (2000)
- Solinger (2003)
- Solinger II (2003)
- Johnny Solinger (2008)

=== The (Party) Dolls ===
- Doll House Rock
