= Revolutions per Minute (Skid Row album) =

Studio album by Skid Row
- Released: October 24, 2006
- Recorded: 2005–2006
- Studios: WireWorld (Nashville, Tennessee)
- Genre: Heavy metal
- Length: 40:24
- Labels: SPV/Steamhammer; Victor (Japan)
- Producer: Michael Wagener

Skid Row chronology
Thickskin (2003)	Revolutions per Minute (2006)	United World Rebellion (2013–2014)

Singles from Revolutions per Minute
- 1. "Shut Up Baby, I Love You" Released: 2006; 2. "Strength" Released: 2006; 3. "Nothing" Released: 2006

Revolutions per Minute is the fifth studio album by American heavy metal band Skid Row, released on October 24, 2006. It is the band's only release with drummer Dave Gara, their last full album with vocalist Johnny Solinger, and also their last studio album for sixteen years until 2022's The Gang's All Here.

== Release and promotion ==
Michael Wagener temporarily reunited with Skid Row and produced the album. It had been 15 years since he co-produced the band's second album Slave to the Grind in 1991. The album received negative reviews and only charted in Japan at number 266. "Shut Up Baby, I Love You" and "Nothing" were released as promo singles and "Strength" is a cover song originally performed by The Alarm.

== Critical reception ==
Professional ratings
Review scores
Source	Rating
About.com	3.5/5 stars
AllMusic	2.5/5 stars
Melodic.net	1/5 stars
Rock Hard	7.0/10
Sputnikmusic	3/5 stars

The album received generally negative reviews. Rock Hard reviewer appreciated the "twelve strong and sometimes punk-tinged hard rockers" in the album and wrote that Skid Row were still capable of producing "ingenious catchy tunes". Marcus Pan of Legends Magazine enjoyed the album and wrote that Skid Row "sound very similar to how they did fifteen years ago", with Solinger a capable singer, who "can hold his own against Bach". Greg Prato of AllMusic had the same impression and wrote that the album offers the "same angry-yet-melodic riff rockers that you long ago came to expect from the group, while Solinger's singing style isn't that far removed from Bach's", concluding that this is "just what you'd expect from Skid Row - for better or for worse." On the contrary, Chad Bowar writing for About.com considered Revolution per Minute "a really diverse album", full of "really catchy songs, good musicianship and showcasing many different facets of Skid Row", with influences ranging from punk, to country, to new wave. Sputnikmusic reviewer found Revolutions per Minute "more appealing" than the "bland poke at modern alternative rock" that were Subhuman Race and Thickskin, but lamented "a massive lack of cohesion" in blending "elements of classic punk, post-punk, country and goth" which "come at the expense of the soaring melodies and break-neck dynamics that made Bach's Skid Row such an exciting listen." Kaj Roth of Melodic.net considered Revolutions per Minute "even worse" than Thickskin, their weakest album, and the music "a worthless cargo of nonsense hard rock."

== Track listing ==
No.	Title	Writer(s)	Length
1.	"Disease"	Rachel Bolan, Dave Sabo	3:32
2.	"Another Dick in the System"	Bolan	3:16
3.	"Pulling My Heart Out from Under Me"	Bolan	3:29
4.	"When God Can't Wait"	Bolan, Scotti Hill	2:15
5.	"Shut Up Baby, I Love You"	Bolan	3:16
6.	"Strength" (The Alarm cover)	Mike Peters, Dave Sharp, Eddie Macdonald, Nigel Twist, Rupert Black	5:07
7.	"White Trash"	Bolan, Sabo	2:53
8.	"You Lie"	Bolan	2:44
9.	"Nothing"	Bolan	3:29
10.	"Love Is Dead"	Bolan	3:38
11.	"Let It Ride"	Bolan	4:03
12.	"You Lie (Corn Fed Mix)" (bonus track)	Bolan	2:43

== Personnel ==
Skid Row

- Johnny Solinger – lead vocals
- Dave Sabo – lead guitar, backing vocals
- Scotti Hill – lead guitar, lap steel, backing vocals
- Rachel Bolan – bass, backing vocals, co-lead vocals on "Another Dick in the System"
- Dave Gara – drums, backing vocals

Additional musicians

- Rachel Hagen – additional vocals on "Another Dick in the System"
- "Jelly Roll" Johnson – harmonica on "You Lie (Corn Fed Mix)"

Production

- Michael Wagener – production, engineering, mixing
- Eric Conn – mastering at Independent Mastering, Nashville, Tennessee
- Rachel Bolan – cover design

== Charts ==
Chart (2006)	Peak position
Japanese Albums (Oricon)	266
