= Matt Fallon =

American heavy metal singer (born 1965)

- Born: Matthew Frankel; September 30, 1965 (age 60); Brooklyn, New York, U.S.
- Genres: Hard rock, heavy metal, glam metal, thrash metal
- Occupations: Musician, singer-songwriter
- Instrument: Vocals
- Years active: 1980–1995

Matt Fallon (born Matthew Frankel; September 30, 1965) is an American heavy metal singer best known for his work with Skid Row and Anthrax.

== Early life ==
Fallon moved to central New Jersey at the age of eight with his parents and younger brother, and by 15 he was playing in a neighborhood garage band with drummer Paul Monroe (aka Paul Schneiderman) who later played with the Los Angeles–based band, XYZ.

== Career ==
Inspired by bands like Led Zeppelin, Black Sabbath, Judas Priest and AC/DC, Fallon fronted several local acts in the early 1980s including Steel Fortune where he teamed up with guitar player Dave Sabo.

Steel Fortune and Anthrax were both on the bill when Metallica came to the Sayreville, New Jersey area in 1983 to promote the release of their first album. In mid 1984 Scott Ian of Anthrax crossed paths with Fallon again at a Steel Fortune show in New York City. After the show Ian asked Fallon if he would like to try out for the lead vocals spot recently vacated by Neil Turbin. Fallon accepted and Anthrax began writing & recording their next album Spreading the Disease at Pyramid Studios in Ithaca, New York. However, Fallon left before finishing the album, and he was replaced by Joey Belladonna.

In 1986, Fallon was contacted by Sabo about fronting his newly formed band Skid Row. Fallon accepted, and Skid Row began recording a demo at Jon Bon Jovi's studio in Philadelphia while playing crowd favorites like "Youth Gone Wild" and "18 and Life" in New York, New Jersey, and Pennsylvania area clubs throughout the year. Fallon also co-wrote the song “Midnight/Tornado” with Sabo. In December 1986 Fallon & Skid Row opened for Bon Jovi on their Slippery When Wet tour in Bethlehem and Johnstown, Pennsylvania. Fallon and Skid Row parted ways in 1987 and he was later replaced by Sebastian Bach.

Fallon continued to front local bands from 1987 through the mid-1990s. In 1990, he married Debra Contillo, and in 1991 he had a daughter, Brittany Rene. In 1991 he recorded a solo album named Fallon, which was released in November 2015.

== Discography ==
Anthrax

- Spreading the Disease (1985) (Lyrics)

Skid Row

- The Matt Fallon Demos (1986)
- Skid Row (1989) (Writing credit on "Midnight / Tornado")

Fallon (1991/2015)
01. Blue Sky in the Rain
02. Light It Up
03. Not a Thing
04. Queen
05. The Rain Inside
06. No Stranger
07. Modern Love
08. Feel It for the First Time
09. Me
10. Bad Attitude
11. Tears
12. Easy Come, Easy Go
