= Thickskin =

Studio album by Skid Row
- Released: August 5, 2003
- Recorded: 2002–2003
- Studios: Sanctuary Studios and Shorefire Studios, New Jersey, The Sanctuary and Reflections, Charlotte, North Carolina
- Genre: Heavy metal
- Length: 46:46
- Labels: Skid Row (U.S.); SPV/Steamhammer (Europe); Victor (Japan)
- Producers: Skid Row, Steven Haigler

Skid Row chronology
40 Seasons: The Best of Skid Row (1998)	Thickskin (2003)	Revolutions per Minute (2006)

Singles from Thickskin
- 1. "Ghost" Released: 2003; 2. "New Generation" Released: 2003; 3. "I Remember You Two" Released: 2003; 4. "Thick is the Skin" Released: 2003

Thickskin is the fourth studio album by American heavy metal band Skid Row, released on August 5, 2003. The come back album is the first to feature new vocalist Johnny Solinger who replaced original singer Sebastian Bach and the only album to feature then-former Saigon Kick drummer Phil Varone. The album featured a change to a more modern sound.

== Release and promotion ==
The album charted at number 46 on the Top Independent albums chart.

"Ghost" was released as a single with a music video filmed in Miami, Florida. Music videos were also made for the second single "New Generation", the promo single "Thick is the Skin" and "One Light", all of which were featured on the DVD Under the Skin (The Making of Thickskin). "I Remember You Two" is a remake of the single "I Remember You" in a punk rock-influenced fashion. The song "Born a Beggar" was written with Sean McCabe when Skid Row was briefly going under the moniker Ozone Monday.

== Reception ==
Professional ratings
Review scores
Source	Rating
AllMusic	3/5 stars
Melodic.net	2.5/5 stars
Rock Hard	8.5/10

Daniel Böhm in his review for the German Rock Hard magazine was very happy of Skid Row's return and wrote that "Thickskin is modern, dripping US Rock'n'Roll with good taste and 100% street credibility", where are exalted "the most uncompromising corners of the last two Skids albums", which old fans may find hard to digest. AllMusic Alex Henderson found Thickskin "surprisingly good" and appreciated the fact that Skid Row revamped their music, combining the "melodic yet hard-driving effort" of their previous albums with a "sort of post-grunge sound one would expect from the Foo Fighters, Silverchair, Creed, or Default". He also predicted that "diehard Bach loyalists" would "inevitably insist that an alterna-rock version of Skid Row isn't really Skid Row." Melodic.net reviewer is one of them, who would "rather play Slave to the Grind again before hearing this one more time." He found that only a couple of tracks retain the flavour of the old band and wrote that, even though the songs are in general decent and the music sounds modern, Thickskin is not a "classic".

== Track listing ==
No.	Title	Writer(s)	Length
1.	"New Generation"	Rachel Bolan, Dave Sabo	3:18
2.	"Ghost"	Bolan, Sabo, Damon Johnson	3:54
3.	"Swallow Me (The Real You)"	Bolan, Sabo	3:38
4.	"Born a Beggar"	Bolan, Sabo, Scotti Hill, Sean McCabe	4:28
5.	"Thick Is the Skin"	Bolan, Sabo	3:48
6.	"See You Around"	Bolan, Sabo, Johnson	4:19
7.	"Mouth of Voodoo"	Bolan, Sabo, Johnny Solinger	4:26
8.	"One Light"	Bolan, Sabo	4:07
9.	"I Remember You Two"	Bolan, Sabo	3:20
10.	"Lamb"	Bolan, Sabo	3:41
11.	"Down from Underground"	Bolan, Sabo, Johnson	4:35
12.	"Hittin' a Wall"	Bolan, Sabo, Hill	3:06

== Under the Skin (The Making of Thickskin) DVD ==
"Under the Skin" was released August 12, 2003, and features a behind-the-scenes look at the making of Thickskin. Set in a documentary style, the DVD also includes a photo gallery, interviews, music videos and live performances.

=== DVD track listing ===
1. "New Generation"
2. "Beat Yourself Blind"
3. "Lamb"
4. "Mouth of Voodoo"
5. "Thick Is the Skin"
6. "One Light"
7. "I Remember You Two"
8. "Ghost"
9. "Quicksand Jesus"
10. "Piece of Me"
11. "See You Around"

== Personnel ==
Skid Row

- Johnny Solinger – lead vocals
- Dave "The Snake" Sabo – lead guitar, backing vocals
- Scotti Hill – lead guitar, backing vocals
- Rachel Bolan – bass, backing vocals
- Phil Varone – drums

Production

- Steven Haigler – production with Skid Row on tracks 4–7, 10 and 12, engineering
- Joseph De Maio – engineering, mixing
- Leon Zervos – mastering at Masterdisk, New York

== Charts ==
Chart (2003)	Peak position
Japanese Albums (Oricon)	111
US Independent Albums (Billboard)	46
