= The Gang's All Here (Skid Row album) =

Studio album by Skid Row
- Released: October 14, 2022
- Recorded: 2021–2022
- Studios: WireWorld (Nashville, Tennessee)
- Genres: Heavy metal; glam metal
- Length: 41:15
- Label: earMUSIC
- Producer: Nick Raskulinecz

Skid Row chronology
United World Rebellion (2014)	The Gang's All Here (2022)	Live in London (2024)

Singles from The Gang's All Here
- 1. "The Gang's All Here" Released: March 25, 2022; 2. "Tear It Down" Released: 2022; 3. "Time Bomb" Released: 2022; 4. "October's Song" Released: 2022; 5. "Resurrected" Released: 2023

The Gang's All Here is the sixth studio album by American heavy metal band Skid Row, their first since Revolutions per Minute (2006). It was released on October 14, 2022, by earMUSIC. It is the band's only studio album with lead singer Erik Grönwall, who replaced ZP Theart in March 2022, as well as the first with Rob Hammersmith, the band's drummer since 2010.

== Background and recording ==
The album was recorded in Nashville, Tennessee and produced by Nick Raskulinecz.

== Release and promotion ==
The title track was released as the lead single and featured a music video which was released on May 25, 2022. The clip features live footage and photos taken and submitted by fans during the band's early 2022 concerts, as well as behind-the-scene footage showing the band rehearsing in the studio and backstage.

The band released the official music video for the second single "Tear It Down" in July 2022. The song is about breaking down barriers and the video was produced by Take 2 Productions / Rosey Media.

In September 2022, Skid Row released the third single "Time Bomb". The music video for the song was released on September 28, and featured director Dale Resteghini, whom Rachel Bolan sought out to realize his artistic vision for the song about humanity's continuing struggles with monotony and self-indulgence.

Following the album's release the band released the single and lyric video for "October's Song" in the first week of November 2022, celebrating the worldwide chart success of the album.

== Reception ==
Blabbermouth.net awarded the album 8/10 saying, "As unexpected as it is welcome, 'The Gang's All Here' is an exciting, edgy rock 'n' roll record with a heavy metal heart." While praising Grönwall as "an inspired addition", Loudersound.com was critical of the album's lyrics saying, "At times ... the material borders on trite ... but you're not looking for the meaning of life in a Skid Row song."

== Track listing ==
No.	Title	Writer(s)	Length
1.	"Hell or High Water"	Rachel Bolan, Dave "The Snake" Sabo	4:41
2.	"The Gang's All Here"	Bolan, Sabo, Paul Taylor	3:37
3.	"Not Dead Yet"	Bolan, Sabo, ZP Theart	2:48
4.	"Time Bomb"	Bolan	4:14
5.	"Resurrected"	Bolan, Scotti Hill, Sabo	3:25
6.	"Nowhere Fast"	Johnny Andrews, Bolan, Hill, Sabo	3:44
7.	"When the Lights Come On"	Bolan	3:54
8.	"Tear It Down"	Bolan, Marti Frederiksen, Hill, Sabo	3:57
9.	"October's Song"	Bolan, Sabo, Theart	7:07
10.	"World on Fire"	Bolan, Sabo, Theart	3:37
Total length:			41:15

== Personnel ==
Skid Row

- Erik Grönwall – lead vocals
- Rachel Bolan – bass, backing vocals
- Dave Sabo – lead & rhythm guitar, backing vocals
- Scotti Hill – lead & rhythm guitar, backing vocals
- Rob Hammersmith – drums, backing vocals

Production

- Nick Raskulinecz – production, engineering, mixing

== Charts ==
Chart (2022)	Peak position
Australian Albums (ARIA)	94
Austrian Albums (Ö3 Austria)	28
Belgian Albums (Ultratop Flanders)	162
Belgian Albums (Ultratop Wallonia)	145
French Albums (SNEP)	109
German Albums (Offizielle Top 100)	15
Japanese Albums (Oricon)	30
Scottish Albums (Official Charts)	17
Spanish Albums (Promusicae)	57
Swedish Albums (Sverigetopplistan)	33
Swiss Albums (Schweizer Hitparade)	5
UK Albums (Official Charts)	67
UK Independent Albums (Official Charts)	7
UK Rock & Metal Albums (Official Charts)	2
US Top Album Sales (Billboard)	14
US Top Hard Rock Albums (Billboard)	19
US Indie Store Album Sales (Billboard)	13
