= Skid Row (Skid Row album) =

Studio album by Skid Row
- Released: January 24, 1989
- Recorded: 1988
- Studios: Royal Recorders, Lake Geneva, Wisconsin
- Genres: Glam metal; hard rock; heavy metal
- Length: 39:28
- Label: Atlantic
- Producer: Michael Wagener

Skid Row chronology
Skid Row (1989)	Slave to the Grind (1991)

Singles from Skid Row
- 1. "Youth Gone Wild" Released: January 1989; 2. "18 and Life" Released: June 16, 1989; 3. "Piece of Me" Released: 1989; 4. "I Remember You" Released: November 18, 1989; 5. "Sweet Little Sister" Released: 1989

Skid Row is the debut studio album by American heavy metal band Skid Row, released on January 24, 1989, by Atlantic Records. After signing with manager Doc McGhee, Skid Row signed with Atlantic and began recording its debut. The album was recorded in Lake Geneva, Wisconsin, with producer Michael Wagener, and received mixed reviews upon its release. The band toured behind the album mainly as an opening act, supporting Bon Jovi and Aerosmith in 1989–1990. The album peaked at number six on the Billboard 200 and was certified 5× platinum by the Recording Industry Association of America (RIAA) in 1995 for shipping five million copies in the United States. It generated five singles: "Youth Gone Wild", "18 and Life", "I Remember You", "Piece of Me" and "Sweet Little Sister", all of which were accompanied by music videos and received heavy rotation on MTV. The album's commercial and critical success made Skid Row a regular feature in rock magazines and brought the group nationwide popularity.

== Background and recording ==
Skid Row was formed in 1986, in Toms River, New Jersey, when guitarist Dave Sabo met bassist Rachel Bolan in a local guitar store where Sabo worked. As they shared similar musical influences, they began rehearsing in Bolan's parents' garage. Guitarist Scotti Hill came from Bolan's previous club band, and Sabo's acquaintance, upstate New Yorker, Rob Affuso, played drums in a Rush tribute band. Once the band was formed, Skid Row started gigging in nightclubs throughout the Eastern United States and quickly built a small following. Sabo was a childhood friend of Jon Bon Jovi and they had agreed if one of them succeeded in the music business, to help the other out. Skid Row caught the attention of Bon Jovi's manager Doc McGhee while opening for Bon Jovi on their 1987 Slippery When Wet Tour. McGhee suggested the band replace original singer Matt Fallon because he lacked the rest of the group's drive.

Sebastian Bach was introduced to Skid Row by the parents of Jon Bon Jovi, who saw Bach sing at rock photographer Mark Weiss' wedding. After completing the lineup, the group signed with Richie Sambora's and Bon Jovi's publishing company Underground, unknowingly giving them the lion's share of the group's royalties. Skid Row later restored Sambora's share of the royalties, but Bon Jovi kept his, which caused a rift between Bon Jovi and Bach. After negotiating with Geffen and A&M, Skid Row finally settled with Ahmet Ertegun and Atlantic in 1988. The band used the Royal Recorders studio in Lake Geneva, Wisconsin with producer Michael Wagener to record its debut album. The unpretentious studio was in the back end of a hotel, where the band stayed. Skid Row worked according to a schedule made by Wagener and stayed "dry" while recording. The sessions went smoothly as the band had been playing and performing the songs for the past year. The label initially pressed 150,000 copies of the album and booked the band an opening slot on Bon Jovi's 1988–1989 New Jersey Syndicate Tour.

== Critical reception and legacy ==
Professional ratings
Review scores
Source	Rating
AllMusic	4/5 stars
Christgau's Record Guide	C+
Collector's Guide to Heavy Metal	7/10
The Encyclopedia of Popular Music	2/5 stars
Kerrang!	4.5/5 stars
Los Angeles Times	1.5/4 stars
Q	3/5 stars
Rock Hard	7.0/10
The Rolling Stone Album Guide	2.5/5 stars
Sputnikmusic	4/5 stars

Upon its release in January 1989, Skid Row did not immediately connect with listeners and received mixed reviews from the music press. With the success of the "I Remember You" single which cracked the Billboard Top 10 in the autumn of 1989, the album took off and eventually sold over 5 million copies, establishing the band as one of the top metal acts of the late 80s. Phil Wilding of Kerrang! found the album quite formulaic, but wrote that the praises for Skid Row expressed by Bon Jovi band members and the range of diversity in their music were "a big hint that they could be something very special in the future." Q magazine described the album as a fusion of rock riffs and commercial hooks, and proclaimed it a notable debut. Spin's Erik Davis said Skid Row was slightly different from contemporary albums by Warrant and Great White because it contained less "fake-gutter narratives of sluts and bad boys", and instead leaned more towards Bon Jovi's earnest anthems. Aniss Garza was more critical in the Los Angeles Times, finding the record "highly unoriginal" and lacking any lyrical substance or musical ingenuity. Robert Christgau in his negative review remarked how the band attempted some social commentary and was not "offensively sexist" if only by heavy metal standards, jokingly saying that the disreputable women in the songs were at least "characters rather than objects". Rock Hard reviewer wrote that this album is an example of how "independence and originality are by no means as in demand" in the US music world as the following of the "success schemes" established by bands like Guns N' Roses, with only a couple of good songs saving it from "sad mediocrity".

Modern reviews are generally more positive. Canadian journalist Martin Popoff described the album as a "basic well-executed corporate metal feast" and praised Bach's performance for carrying the record and "raising the average to something worth reckoning." He thought Skid Row represented a "grittier, more street version of hair metal", unlike its California-based peers. AllMusic's Steve Huey classified the album as "typical pop-metal fluff" of the late 1980s, but praised it for the consistent songwriting and said Bach's vocals gave the songs the much-needed nasty attitude. Sputnikmusic's Dave Donnelly considered Skid Row one of the more talented bands of the glam era because of its charismatic frontman, and described the group's debut as mainly a "party album" best remembered for its ballads. The critical and commercial success of Skid Row made the band a regular feature in rock magazines such as Hit Parader, Circus, and Metal Edge in the late 1980s and early 1990s.

In 2017, Metal Hammer included the album in their list of "the 10 hair metal albums you need in your record collection".

In 2022, Loudwire placed the album at No. 4 on their list of the Top 30 Hair Metal Albums, saying Skid Row "were decidedly more edgy [than other hair metal bands of the decade], focusing more on razor sharp riffs than razor-slashed stage wear".

== Promotion and touring ==
The 17-month worldwide tour included an appearance at Moscow Music Peace Festival in August 1989 to a crowd of 70,000. The event was organized by McGhee as a penance for drug smuggling and featured artists managed by him or his brother. Skid Row made its UK debut at the Milton Keynes Bowl supporting Bon Jovi, and headlined London's Hammersmith Odeon two months later. After finishing the tour in support of Bon Jovi's New Jersey album, Skid Row opened on Aerosmith's Pump Tour, which launched in October 1989 and lasted a year. At the concert in Springfield, Massachusetts in December, a fan threw a bottle onstage during Skid Row's set. Upset, Bach threw the bottle back into the crowd and hit a 17-year-old female fan in the face. The incident was filmed by a fan and Bach was arrested after the show. He was set free on $10,000 bail and received three years of probation. At another show in 1990, Bach wore a T-shirt with the anti-gay slogan "AIDS Kills Fags Dead". Bach said he put the T-shirt on after a fan threw it onstage, but later regretted the incident, saying he does not support homophobia. Thanks to heavy touring and the band's exposure on MTV, Skid Row quickly went platinum and remained a Billboard top 10 album three months after its release. The album spawned three singles: "Youth Gone Wild", "18 and Life", and "I Remember You", of which the last two charted in the top 10 on the Billboard Hot 100. "Piece of Me" and "Sweet Little Sister" were released as promo singles and also accompanied by music videos.

== Track listing ==
All tracks are written by Dave Sabo and Rachel Bolan, except where noted.

No.	Title	Writer(s)	Length
1.	"Big Guns"	Sabo; Bolan; Scotti Hill; Rob Affuso	3:36
2.	"Sweet Little Sister"		3:10
3.	"Can't Stand the Heartache"	Bolan	3:24
4.	"Piece of Me"	Bolan	2:48
5.	"18 and Life"		3:50
6.	"Rattlesnake Shake"		3:07
7.	"Youth Gone Wild"		3:18
8.	"Here I Am"		3:10
9.	"Makin' a Mess"	Sabo; Bolan; Sebastian Bach	3:38
10.	"I Remember You"		5:10
11.	"Midnight / Tornado"	Sabo; Matt Fallon	4:17
Total length:			39:28

30th Anniversary Deluxe Edition disc 2
No.	Title	Writer(s)	Length
12.	"Forever"	Sabo; Bolan; Hill	4:05
13.	"Makin' a Mess" (Live at The Marquee, Westminster, CA 4/28/89)	Sabo; Bolan; Bach	4:11
14.	"Piece of Me" (Live at The Marquee, Westminster, CA 4/28/89)	Bolan	3:07
15.	"Big Guns" (Live at The Marquee, Westminster, CA 4/28/89)	Sabo; Bolan; Hill; Affuso	4:07
16.	"18 and Life" (Live at The Marquee, Westminster, CA 4/28/89)		3:49
17.	"Sweet Little Sister" (Live at The Marquee, Westminster, CA 4/28/89)		3:55
18.	"Rattlesnake Shake" (Live at The Marquee, Westminster, CA 4/28/89)		3.43
19.	"I Remember You" (Live at The Marquee, Westminster, CA 4/28/89)		5.55
20.	"Here I Am" (Live at The Marquee, Westminster, CA 4/28/89)		5.34
21.	"Youth Gone Wild" (Live at The Marquee, Westminster, CA 4/28/89)		4.27
22.	"Cold Gin" (Live at The Marquee, Westminster, CA 4/28/89)	Ace Frehley	4.53
Total length:			1:27:00

== Personnel ==
Credits are adapted from the album's liner notes.

=== Skid Row ===
- Sebastian Bach
- Dave Sabo
- Scotti Hill
- Rachel Bolan
- Rob Affuso

=== Production ===
- Michael Wagener – production, engineering, mixing
- David Kent – additional engineering
- David Michael Kennedy – front cover photography
- Mark Weiss – back cover photography
- Gina Guarini – logo design
- Bob Defrin – art direction
- Jason Flom, Dorothy Sicignano – A&R

== Charts ==
=== Weekly charts ===
Chart (1989–1990)	Peak position
Australian Albums (ARIA)	12
Canada Top Albums/CDs (RPM)	11
Finnish Albums (The Official Finnish Charts)	5
German Albums (Offizielle Top 100)	22
Italian Albums (Musica e Dischi)	16
Japanese Albums (Oricon)	35
New Zealand Albums (RMNZ)	1
Swedish Albums (Sverigetopplistan)	21
Swiss Albums (Schweizer Hitparade)	26
UK Albums (Official Charts)	30
US Billboard 200	6

Chart (2023)	Peak position
UK Rock & Metal Albums (Official Charts)	28

=== Year-end charts ===
Chart (1989)	Position
US Billboard 200	11

Chart (1990)	Position
New Zealand Albums (RMNZ)	12
US Billboard 200	38

== Certifications ==
Region	Certification	Certified units/sales
Australia (ARIA)	Platinum	70,000^{^}
Canada (Music Canada)	3× Platinum	300,000^{^}
Finland (Musiikkituottajat)	Gold	29,570
Japan (RIAJ)	Platinum	200,000^{^}
New Zealand (RMNZ)	Platinum	15,000^{^}
United Kingdom (BPI)	Gold	100,000^{^}
United States (RIAA)	5× Platinum	5,000,000^{^}
^{^} Shipments figures based on certification alone.
