= United World Rebellion =

EP / EPs by Skid Row
- Released: April 16, 2013; August 5, 2014
- Recorded: 2012–2014
- Genre: Heavy metal
- Length: Chapter 1 – 30:30; Chapter 2 – 28:46
- Label: Megaforce
- Producers: Rachel Bolan, Dave Sabo

Skid Row chronology
Revolutions per Minute (2006)	United World Rebellion (2013)	The Gang's All Here (2022)

Chapter Two cover

Rise of the Damnation Army – United World Rebellion: Chapter Two

Singles from United World Rebellion
- 1. "Kings of Demolition" Released: 2013; 2. "This Is Killing Me" Released: 2013; 3. "We Are the Damned" Released: 2014

United World Rebellion is a double EP from the American heavy metal band Skid Row. The first and second chapters were released on April 16, 2013, and August 5, 2014, by Megaforce Records and were Skid Row's final recordings with singer Johnny Solinger. A third chapter was planned and scheduled for a 2015 release but was pushed back to 2016 due to Solinger's departure and pushed back again due to Tony Harnell's sudden departure. The third installment was eventually planned to feature ex-DragonForce lead singer ZP Theart, but once he was replaced by Erik Grönwall, the EP was scrapped in favour of a full new album, which ultimately became The Gang's All Here in 2022.

== Release and promotion ==
=== United World Rebellion: Chapter One ===
United World Rebellion: Chapter One was released on April 16, 2013, and is the band's first EP since 1995, and the first in a set of upcoming EPs over the next 12–18 months. The recording was released by Megaforce Records and sold 1,500 copies in its first week in the US. "Kings of Demolition" was released as a single and features a music video. "This Is Killing Me" was released as the second single and also features a music video.

=== Rise of the Damnation Army – United World Rebellion: Chapter Two ===
Rise of the Damnation Army – United World Rebellion: Chapter Two was released on August 5, 2014, by Megaforce, and sold 1,300 copies in the US in its first week. "We Are the Damned" was released as a single and features a music video.

== Critical reception ==
Professional ratings
Review scores
Source	Rating
AllMusic	3/5 stars
Blabbermouth	8/10
Classic Rock	3.5/5 stars

Chapter One: Since its release, the album has been met with mostly positive reception from critics. Music Enthusiast Magazine described the album as "a maelstrom of nostalgic heavy rock, that sounds like what should have been the follow-up to Subhuman Race".

Chapter Two: Crash Crafton of Legendary Rock Interviews said in his review: "I thoroughly enjoyed the first chapter but this one takes it to a whole new level. They return as aggressive and angry as ever! ... The band is firing on all cylinders and is as cohesive as ever."

== Track listing ==
=== Chapter One ===
1. "Kings of Demolition" - 4:10
2. "Let's Go" - 2:55
3. "This Is Killing Me" - 4:56
4. "Get Up" - 4:57
5. "Stitches" 3:42
6. "Fire Fire" (Ezo cover) – 5:51
7. "United" (Judas Priest cover) – 3:59

=== Chapter Two ===
1. "We Are the Damned" – 4:22
2. "Give It the Gun" – 3:46
3. "Catch Your Fall" – 4:22
4. "Damnation Army" – 3:54
5. "Zero Day" – 4:36
6. "Sheer Heart Attack" (Queen cover) – 3:27
7. "Rats in the Cellar" (Aerosmith cover) – 4:19

== Personnel ==
=== Skid Row ===
Chapters 1 and 2

- Johnny Solinger – lead vocals
- Dave Sabo – guitar, backing vocals
- Scotti Hill – guitar, backing vocals
- Rachel Bolan – bass, backing vocals
- Rob Hammersmith – drums, backing vocals
