= The Gang's All Here (song) =

2022 single by Skid Row

Single by Skid Row

from the album The Gang's All Here
- Released: March 25, 2022 (single)
- Length: 3:37
- Label: earMUSIC
- Producer: Nick Raskulinecz

Skid Row singles chronology
"18 and Life (2015)" (2015)	"The Gang's All Here" (2022)	"Tear It Down" (2022)

"The Gang's All Here" is a song by American rock band Skid Row. It was released on March 25, 2022, as the first single from their sixth studio album of the same name and the first song to feature frontman Erik Grönwall following ZP Theart's dismissal from the band in March 2022.

== Writing ==
The song was written by Skid Row. The lyrics makes a nod to "tricky little Vicky," who first appeared in the band's 1989 song "Rattlesnake Shake."

== Recording ==
The song was recorded in Nashville, Tennessee, and produced by Grammy Award-winning producer Nick Raskulinecz who has previously worked with the Foo Fighters, Rush, Alice in Chains, Halestorm, and Evanescence. Frontman Erik Grönwall recorded the vocals while he was still in Sweden prior to him joining the band for their tour with the Scorpions for the latter's Las Vegas residency. In an interview, guitarist Dave Sabo shed some light on the recording process for the song, revealing that vocalist Erik Grönwall laid down the vocals for the song in 24 hours upon receiving it from the band.

== Release ==
A snippet of the song premiered on SiriusXM's Trunk Nation With Eddie Trunk on March 23, 2022. Two days later, the song received its official premiere online.

== Music video ==
The music video for "The Gang's All Here" was released on May 25, 2022. The clip features live footage and photos taken and submitted by fans during the band's early 2022 concerts, as well as behind-the-scene footage showing the band rehearsing in studio and backstage.

== Reception ==
Reviews for "The Gang's All Here" have been positive. Ultimate Classic Rock's Bryan Rolli described the song as "[a]n upbeat nod to [the band's] classic era". Loudwire's Joe DiVita praised Grönwall's "killer set of pipes and a ton of charisma," calling the song "a standout track" and "one that will take many fans right back to the late '80s and early '90s."

== Live performance ==
Skid Row debuted the song live on March 26, 2022, at the Zappos Theater in Las Vegas as the group served as the opening act for the Scorpions' Sin City Nights residency, which ran until April 16, 2022.
