= Youth Gone Wild =

1989 single by Skid Row

Single by Skid Row

from the album Skid Row
- Released: January 1989 (US)
- Recorded: 1988
- Genre: Glam metal
- Length: 3:18
- Label: Atlantic
- Songwriters: Rachel Bolan, Dave Sabo
- Producer: Michael Wagener

Skid Row singles chronology
"Youth Gone Wild" (1989)	"18 and Life" (1989)

"Youth Gone Wild/ Delivering the Goods"

Single by Skid Row

from the album B-Side Ourselves
- Released: 17 August 1992 (UK)
- Genre: Glam metal
- Label: Atlantic
- Songwriters: Rachel Bolan, Dave Sabo
- Producer: Michael Wagener

Skid Row singles chronology
"Quicksand Jesus" (1992)	"Youth Gone Wild/ Delivering the Goods" (1992)	"My Enemy" (1995)

"Youth Gone Wild" is the debut single from American heavy metal band Skid Row's debut album, released in January 1989.

"Sleazegrinder" of Louder included the song in his list of "The 20 Greatest Hair Metal Anthems Of All Time".

== Music and lyrics ==
"Sleazegrinder" of Louder said the track "is pure rip-snorting, hard-as-nails power-rock". He said the song's lyrics "captured the essence of glam’s suburban teenage malaise."

== Background ==
The song's music video received heavy airplay on MTV; however, as a single it only reached #99 on the US Billboard Hot 100 and reached #27 on the Mainstream Rock Tracks.

The song was re-released as a single in 1992, with a live recording of "Delivering the Goods" (from the band's B-Side Ourselves EP) as the B-side; it charted again at #22 on the UK Singles chart.

== Track listing ==
=== 7" vinyl, CC, Japan mini CD ===
1. "Youth Gone Wild"
2. "Sweet Little Sister"

=== UK 7" shaped vinyl ===
1. "Youth Gone Wild"
2. "Rattleshake Snake (live)"

=== UK 12" vinyl ===
1. "Youth Gone Wild"
2. "Makin' A Mess (live)
3. "Sweet Little Sister"

=== Youth Gone Wild/Delivering The Goods UK 7" vinyl, CC (1992) ===
1. "Youth Gone Wild"
2. "Delivering the Goods" (live, Judas Priest cover)

=== Youth Gone Wild/Delivering The Goods UK 12" vinyl, CD (1992) ===
1. "Youth Gone Wild"
2. "Delivering the Goods" (live, Judas Priest cover)
3. "Psycho Therapy (Ramones cover)"
4. "Get the Fuck Out"

== Personnel ==
- Sebastian Bach – vocals
- Dave Sabo – guitar
- Scotti Hill – guitar
- Rachel Bolan – bass
- Rob Affuso – drums

== Charts ==
Chart (1989)	Peak position
UK Singles (Official Charts)	42
US Billboard Hot 100	99
US Mainstream Rock (Billboard)	27
