= Timothy DiDuro =

American drummer

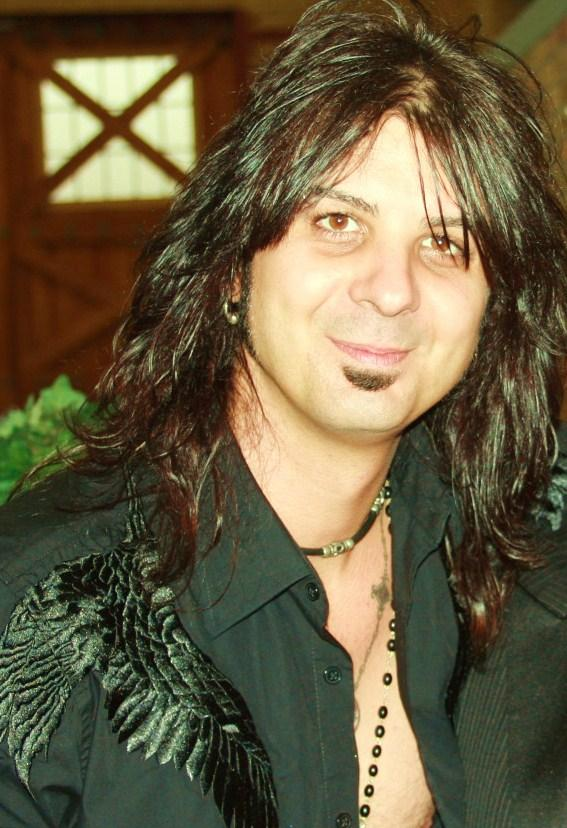

Background information
- Born: Timothy M. DiDuro; August 2, 1971 (age 55); Geneva, New York, United States
- Genres: Rock; glam metal; heavy metal
- Occupations: Drummer, musician
- Instrument: Drums
- Years active: 1991–present
- Website: https://timothydiduro.com/

Timothy DiDuro (born August 2, 1971) is an American hard rock drummer. DiDuro played drums for the bands Skid Row and Slaughter.

== Biography ==
Born in Geneva, New York, DiDuro learned to play drums at age 5. He played with various local bands during high school. He moved to Orlando, Florida in 1991 and played with Andrew "Duck" MacDonald in the band Playground for 5 years.

He joined The Kill in 1997. In 1998, The Kill won a contest called "Kick Start Your Career," which was a Battle of the Bands-type competition that the band Mötley Crüe was sponsoring; one winner in each city got to open for the Mötley Crüe show - The Kill opened in Orlando. The Kill also won the 1998 Orlando Music Awards for best Metal Band. They released one album on Forbidden Records in 1998. He then played with Brizz (one of the original founding member of the band Lyte Funky Ones[LFO]) from 2001 to 2003.

In early 2004, he replaced Skid Row's drummer Phil Varone, who had abruptly left the band. He also appeared in the Skid Row video "Ghost." In late 2004, he auditioned for Slaughter and, although he was never given the job, he played with them until 2011 as their temporary touring drummer.

He has also played with Vince Neil, and with Mark Slaughter's band Scrap Metal. Scrap Metal consists of Mark Slaughter and other platinum-selling singers such as Gunnar Nelson (Nelson) and Eric Martin (Mr. Big).

DiDuro currently plays drums with Pipestone, which is a five-piece heavy rock band from the Florida area. Collectively the band members have had 5 number one radio hits and have toured the United States extensively with other projects. The band recorded their first CD with producer Brett Hestla.

DiDuro currently plays Pearl drums, having previously endorsed DW. He also uses Remo drumheads and Sabian cymbals, also having been seen previously with the likes of Zildjian and Meinl.

== Discography ==
The Kill

- Superdragsmackheadpsychoplasticgogopunk (1998)

== See also ==
- Slaughter
- Skid Row
