= Skid Row (American band) =

American rock band

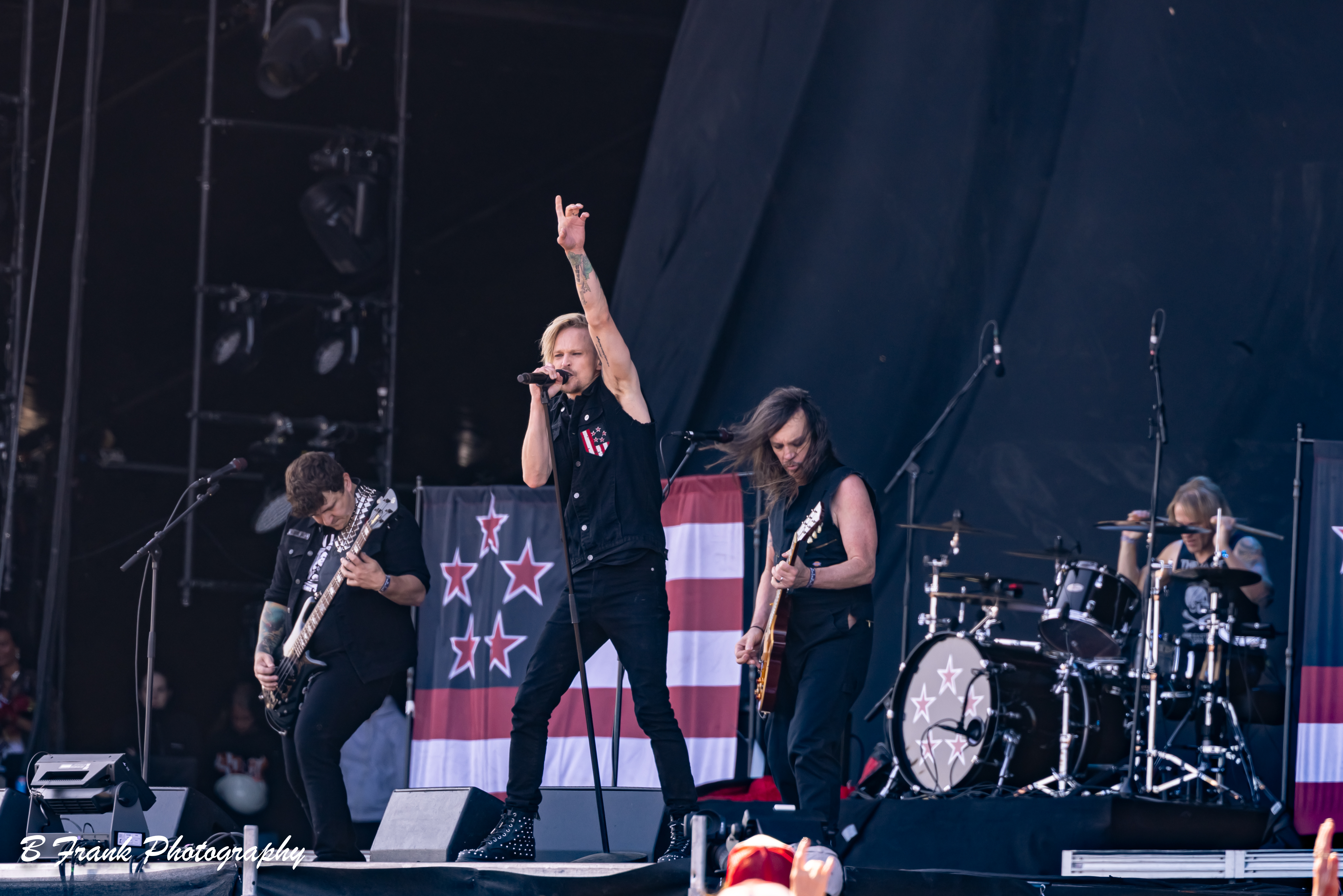
- Skid Row performing in 2023

Background information
- Origin: Toms River, New Jersey, U.S.
- Genres: Heavy metal; hard rock; glam metal
- Works: Discography
- Years active: 1986–1996; 1999–present
- Labels: Atlantic; SPV; Megaforce; earMUSIC
- Spinoffs: Ozone Monday; Prunella Scales
- Members: Dave Sabo; Rachel Bolan; Scotti Hill; Rob Hammersmith; Justin Sargent
- Past members: Sebastian Bach; Matt Fallon; Rob Affuso; Johnny Solinger; Phil Varone; Tony Harnell; Dave Gara; ZP Theart; Erik Grönwall
- Website: skidrow.com

Skid Row is an American hard rock/heavy metal band formed in 1986 in Toms River, New Jersey. Their current lineup comprises bassist Rachel Bolan, guitarists Dave Sabo and Scotti Hill, drummer Rob Hammersmith and frontman Justin Sargent.

The group achieved commercial success with their multi-platinum albums Skid Row (1989) and Slave to the Grind (1991), the latter of which reached number one on the Billboard 200. Those two albums also produced some of Skid Row's most popular hits, both in the United States and abroad. Those hits include "18 and Life" and "I Remember You", which peaked in the Top 10 of the Billboard Hot 100, and other charting singles such as "Youth Gone Wild", "Monkey Business", "Slave to the Grind", "Wasted Time", and "In a Darkened Room". The band's third album Subhuman Race (1995) was also critically acclaimed, but failed to repeat the success of its predecessors. The first three Skid Row albums featured the band's "classic" lineup, which consisted of Bolan, Sabo, Hill, drummer Rob Affuso, and frontman Sebastian Bach. The band had sold 20 million albums worldwide by the end of 1996. Amid rising tensions, Bach was fired and Affuso left Skid Row towards the end of that year, after which the band entered a three-year hiatus.

Skid Row reformed in 1999 with Johnny Solinger on lead vocals and a revolving cast of drummers, the latest being Hammersmith. Solinger recorded two studio albums with the band. – Thickskin (2003) and Revolutions per Minute (2006) – as well as the EPs United World Rebellion: Chapter One and Rise of the Damnation Army – United World Rebellion: Chapter Two (2013 and 2014, respectively). Other lead vocalists for the band have included Tony Harnell, ZP Theart, Erik Grönwall (who debuted on their 2022 studio album, The Gang's All Here), Lzzy Hale, and Justin Sargent.

== History ==
=== Early years (1986–1988) ===
Skid Row was formed in 1986 in Toms River, New Jersey, by bassist Rachel Bolan and guitarist Dave Sabo. The pair recruited guitarist Scotti Hill and drummer Rob Affuso through newspaper ads. Lead vocalist Sebastian Bach replaced original singer Matt Fallon after the band spotted Bach singing at rock photographer Mark Weiss's wedding at the age of 18, and the members asked him to join in early 1987. Bolan claimed in a 2020 interview on the Chuck Shute Podcast that, before settling with Bach on vocals, future Mötley Crüe singer John Corabi auditioned for Skid Row. The band began playing shows in clubs throughout the eastern United States.

Sabo and Jon Bon Jovi were teenage friends and Sabo was briefly a member of Bon Jovi before being replaced by guitarist Richie Sambora. Sabo and Bon Jovi agreed that if one of them made it in the music business, he would help the other. Bon Jovi's manager Doc McGhee sought out Skid Row and secured the band a record deal with Atlantic Records in 1988. Skid Row recorded its debut album Skid Row at the Royal Recorders in Lake Geneva, Wisconsin with producer Michael Wagener. Before releasing the album, the management paid a reported $35,000 to guitarist Gary Moore for the rights to the name of his original band.

=== Skid Row and Slave to the Grind (1989–1992) ===
The band's debut album Skid Row, released in January 1989, was an instant success. The album went 5× platinum on the strength of three singles: "Youth Gone Wild", "18 and Life" and "I Remember You", the latter two becoming Top 10 hits. Skid Row supported the album by opening for Bon Jovi on their New Jersey tour. As part of the six-month tour, Skid Row played its first-ever UK gig supporting Bon Jovi's outdoor show at Milton Keynes Bowl on August 19, 1989. The next day, Skid Row played a successful club show at London's Marquee Club in Charing Cross Road. Skid Row also took part in the Moscow Music Peace Festival, which was set up to keep McGhee out of jail, recording a cover of the Sex Pistols' "Holidays in the Sun" for the Make A Difference Foundation release Stairway to Heaven/Highway to Hell. McGhee was facing drug trafficking charges, and therefore set up an anti-drug/peace concert in Russia, featuring a few of the artists that he and his brother managed.

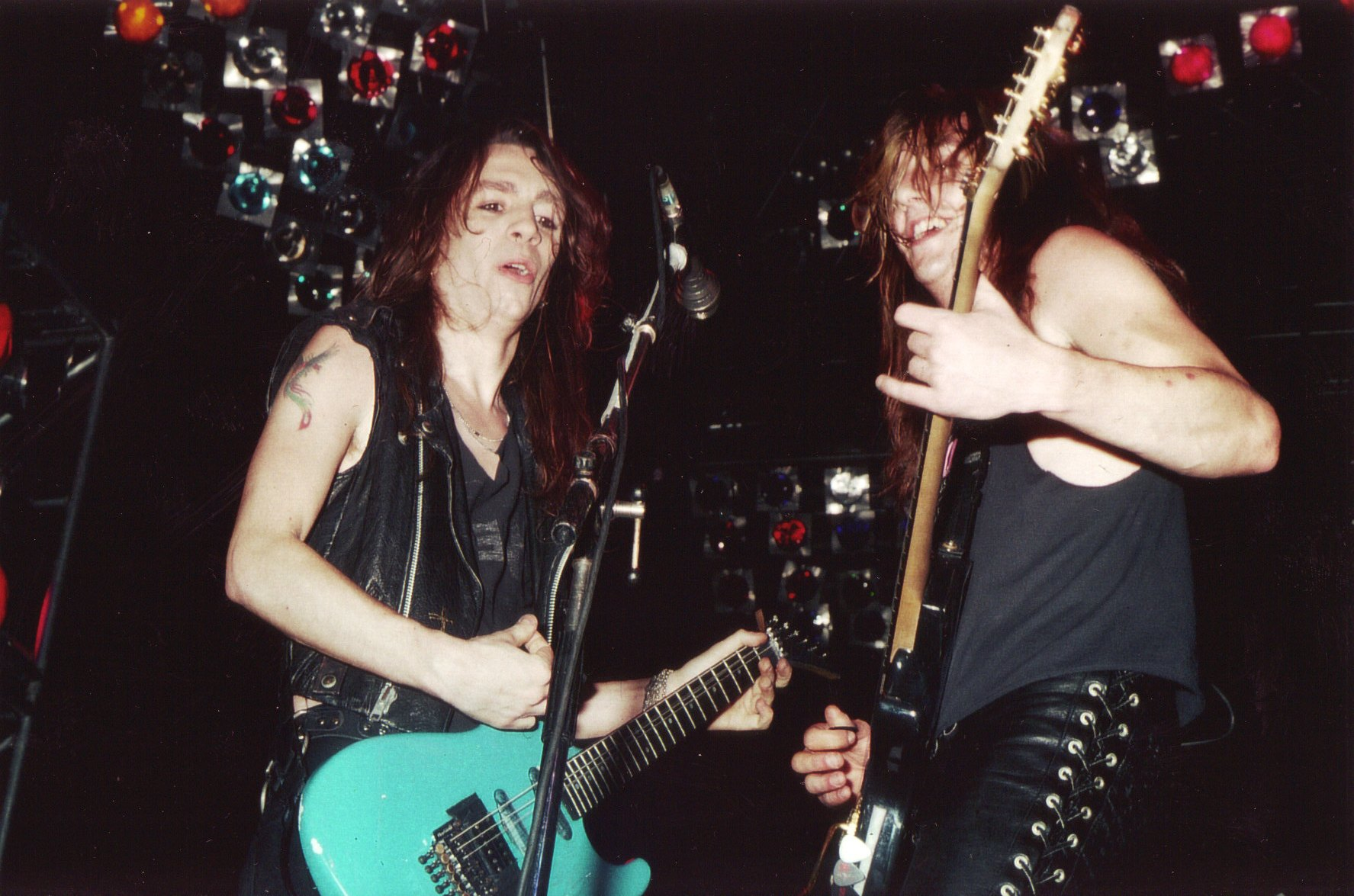
Guitarists Scotti Hill and Dave "Snake" Sabo performing with the band in 1989

Skid Row returned to the UK three months later, opening for Mötley Crüe on their European Dr. Feelgood world tour in early November 1989 with Mr. Big. That was followed by a UK headlining tour culminating in a show at London's Hammersmith Odeon, with Vain supporting. Skid Row continued touring into 1990, including supporting Aerosmith on the North American leg of their Pump tour.

In what is referred to as "The Bottle Incident" by fans of the band, Bach was hit onstage with a bottle thrown from the crowd at a concert in Springfield, Massachusetts, where Skid Row was opening for Aerosmith on December 27, 1989. Bach threw the bottle back, hitting a girl (not the thrower), then he jumped on the crowd to beat the person who can be seen on a tour video released by Skid Row called Oh Say Can You Scream in 1990.

Shortly thereafter, at another show, Bach put on a T-shirt proclaiming the anti-gay slogan "AIDS Kills Fags Dead" as a spoof of the slogan for the insecticide Raid, "Raid Kills Bugs Dead". The shirt was previously given to him by a fan, as Bach was seen wearing the year prior. On MTV News Bach dismissed the controversy saying "I don't see what the big deal is really but I guess if someone wore a T-shirt saying 'Cancer Kills Grandmas Dead' I'd probably be a little bit pissed too." Bach eventually expressed regret over the incident, claiming that he did not read the slogan before putting the shirt on, even though he wore it for a photo shoot in Metal Edge magazine.

Skid Row returned to the studio with Wagener in 1990 to record its second studio album Slave to the Grind. The album was released in June 1991 and debuted at number one on the Billboard 200, reaching 2× platinum status without any radio hits. It was a departure for the band; while Skid Row was an album that followed the typical 1980s band formula, Slave to the Grind had a heavier sound. Skid Row once again went out on a worldwide tour that lasted over a year, including a leg supporting Guns N' Roses in 1991 and an appearance at Monsters of Rock in Castle Donington in 1992. The band then took out Pantera, Soundgarden, L.A. Guns and Love/Hate as supporting acts as part of the tour supporting Slave to the Grind. Skid Row had originally asked then-upcoming grunge band Nirvana to open for them but they declined, saying that Skid Row was "too homophobic", relating to the Sebastian Bach T-shirt incident. Coincidentally, an earlier incarnation of Nirvana was briefly also named Skid Row.

On June 10, 1991 in Saratoga Springs, NY while opening for Guns N' Roses the band was playing Monkey Business (Skid Row song) when a eager fan ran onstage and Sebastian sang with him for a second before letting the fan run across the stage, Sebastian noticed the fan being hassled by security in front of the amp stack, Bach ran over to intervene, ending with Bach narrowly missing the stack falling on him, on multiple occaisons he'd describe this incident as him nearly getting crushed to death.

An EP of covers B-Side Ourselves was released in September 1992. Not only does the EP include cover versions of songs originally recorded by artists that had influenced Skid Row, but it is essentially a compilation of tracks that had previously appeared as B-sides of the Slave to the Grind-era singles, while its closing track – the cover version of Jimi Hendrix's "Little Wing" – had never appeared elsewhere. B-Side Ourselves peaked at number 58 on the Billboard 200 (Skid Row's lowest chart position to date), and it was certified gold by the RIAA approximately six months after its release.

=== Subhuman Race (1993–1998) ===
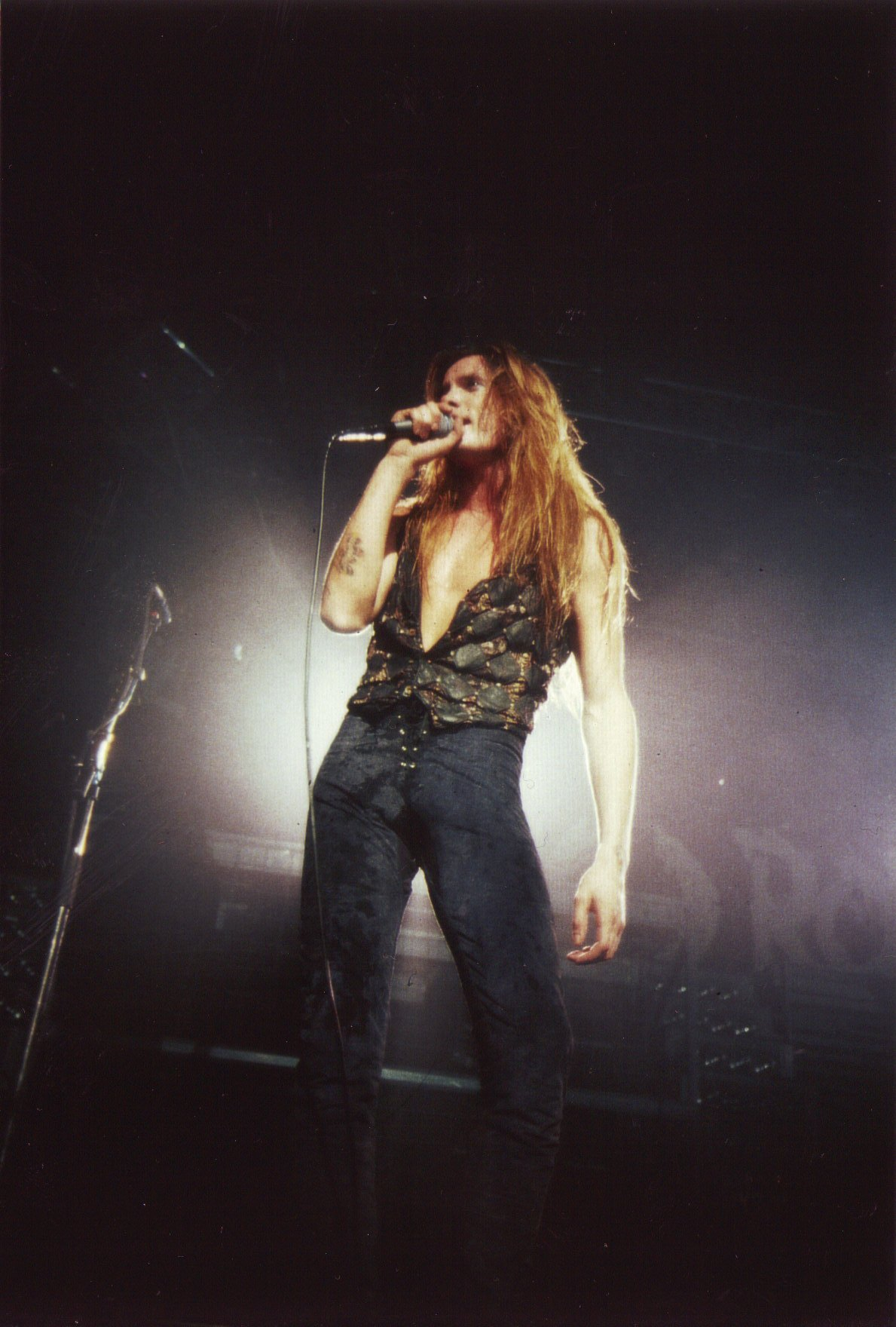
Sebastian Bach, who replaced early frontman Matt Fallon, was the lead singer for Skid Row from 1987 until 1996.

After the Slave to the Grind tour ended in February 1993 in Australia, where they again opened for Guns N' Roses, Skid Row took an extended hiatus on McGhee's recommendation to wait for the grunge movement to fade away. Also during this period, Skid Row parted ways with Wagener, possibly due to the music taking a different direction for the follow-up to Slave to the Grind. In 1994, the band returned to the studio with producer Bob Rock to record its third album Subhuman Race. The members of Skid Row have claimed that its recording sessions were filled with rising tensions between both the band members and Rock, including debates over the album's musical direction, and have also indicated that this was the beginning of the band's strained relationship with Bach. Subhuman Race was released in March 1995, and peaked in the top 40 on the US charts, supported by the singles "My Enemy", "Breakin' Down" and "Into Another", the latter being the band's last to chart there. Although the album did not achieve the success of its predecessors, it received mixed to positive reviews and has also been viewed as Skid Row's darkest album. As of 2019, the band rarely plays any songs from Subhuman Race live; most of them were last performed on the album's tour in 1995, while "Beat Yourself Blind" is the only song they have played live with its subsequent singers Johnny Solinger and ZP Theart.

At that point, the band shifted to performing at smaller venues and its videos were rarely played on MTV, partly because of the rise in popularity of grunge and the subsequent decline of the 1980s style of heavy metal. Skid Row was the opening act for Van Halen on the North American leg of their Balance tour. Eventually, Bach was fired from the band in late 1996 after an argument with Bolan who turned down an opening slot on the Kiss reunion tour even though Bach had already booked it. The other band members told Bach that Skid Row was too big to be an opening act and that they were not going to do the show. Bach, a Kiss fan, then left a message on Snake's answering machine telling them the band would never be too big to open for Kiss along with a number of insults; this resulted in Snake telling Bach that he would never work with him again.

Dangerous Toys vocalist Jason McMaster revealed in a May 2020 interview on The Chuck Shute Podcast that, during this period, he was approached by Sabo and Bolan to audition for Skid Row as Bach's replacement, but turned it down as he was "just not a huge fan" and "was trying to get Toys back on the road." McMaster also recalled: "Sebastian was gone, so whatever year he was gone [is when they got in touch with me]. When he left, and here's a campfire, and Snake and Rachel are sitting around: 'Well, who do we wanna try out?' And my name was on the list."

Bolan had a side project, the punk band Prunella Scales. Four years later, Skid Row was one of the opening acts for the 2000 Kiss Farewell Tour despite the other members having previously indicated to Bach that the band was too big for such a thing. In 1998, Skid Row released the compilation 40 Seasons: The Best of Skid Row without Bach's input. After Bach's departure, the remaining members continued as Ozone Monday with singer Shawn McCabe of Mars Needs Women. In 1998 and 1999, the group opened up for Kiss and Mötley Crüe under the new moniker.

=== Thickskin and Revolutions per Minute (1999–2008) ===
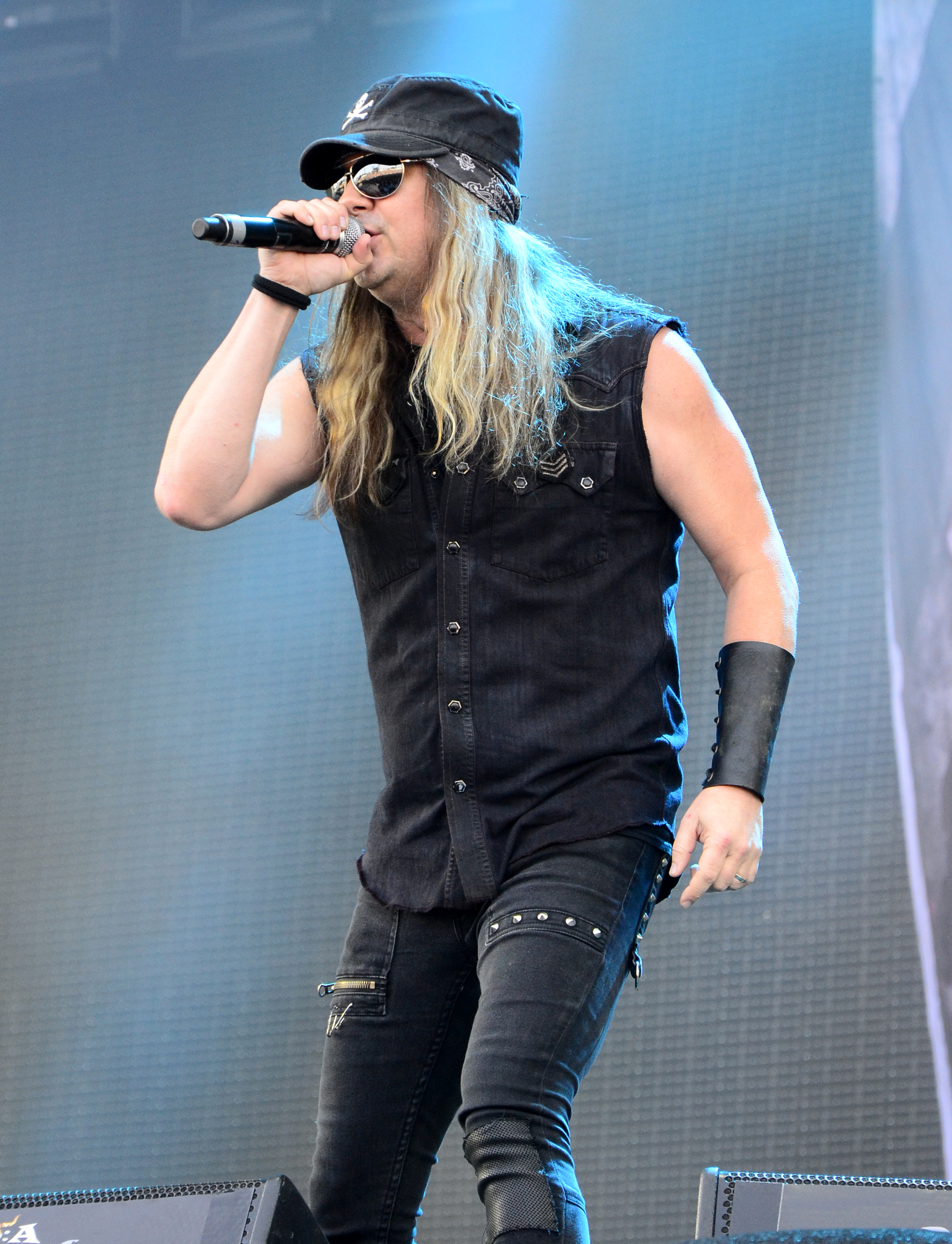
Former Solinger frontman Johnny Solinger (pictured performing with the band at Wacken Open Air 2014) joined Skid Row in 1999 as the replacement of "classic" frontman Sebastian Bach, and stayed with the band until 2015.

Skid Row reformed in 1999 with new lead vocalist, former Solinger vocalist Johnny Solinger and drummer Phil Varone, then-formerly of Saigon Kick. After reforming, the band opened for Kiss on its farewell tour, and also played with other 1980s metal bands such as Poison and INXS bassist Garry Gary Beers. In 2002 they were part of the Rock Never Stops Tour. Skid Row released its fourth full-length studio album Thickskin in the summer of 2003, which was the first album to feature Solinger, the only to feature Varone, and its first studio album in 8 years. In 2004, Dave Gara joined as the new drummer.

The fifth Skid Row album Revolutions per Minute was released in October 2006 by SPV Records, the second and final album to feature Solinger and only to feature Gara. Wagener reunited with Skid Row and became this album's producer. In 2007, the band recorded "Jingle Bells" for a Monster Ballads Christmas album. In January 2008 they performed as part of the Motley Cruise with Mötley Crüe, Ratt and Slaughter. In early 2010 Rob Hammersmith became the band's new drummer.

=== United World Rebellion (2009–2016) ===
Speaking in 2009 about the next Skid Row album, Hill said "we haven't sat down and recorded anything yet, but we have sat down and worked out some ideas and just played them on a handheld recorder. Everybody's writing and we're getting into that mindset. Once the wheels get in motion we'll all probably fly out to Atlanta spend a week or two up there come home, go back up there do it again, we're all living in different cities, which can make it difficult at times."

In February 2013 Skid Row signed with Megaforce Records, and stated the new material would be released as three separate EPs. The first chapter United World Rebellion: Chapter One, was released in April 2013, with two more EPs set to follow in the following 12 to 18 months.

In February 2014, the band began working on the second EP. In August 2014, Skid Row released the second chapter of the trilogy titled Rise of the Damnation Army. In February 2015, Skid Row were writing the third chapter of the United World Rebellion series. In April, Solinger was fired from the band, and the same day he was replaced with Tony Harnell, then-formerly of the Norwegian power metal band TNT. That same month the band released a re-recorded version of its early single, "18 and Life," as a free download.

=== The Gang's All Here (2016–present) ===
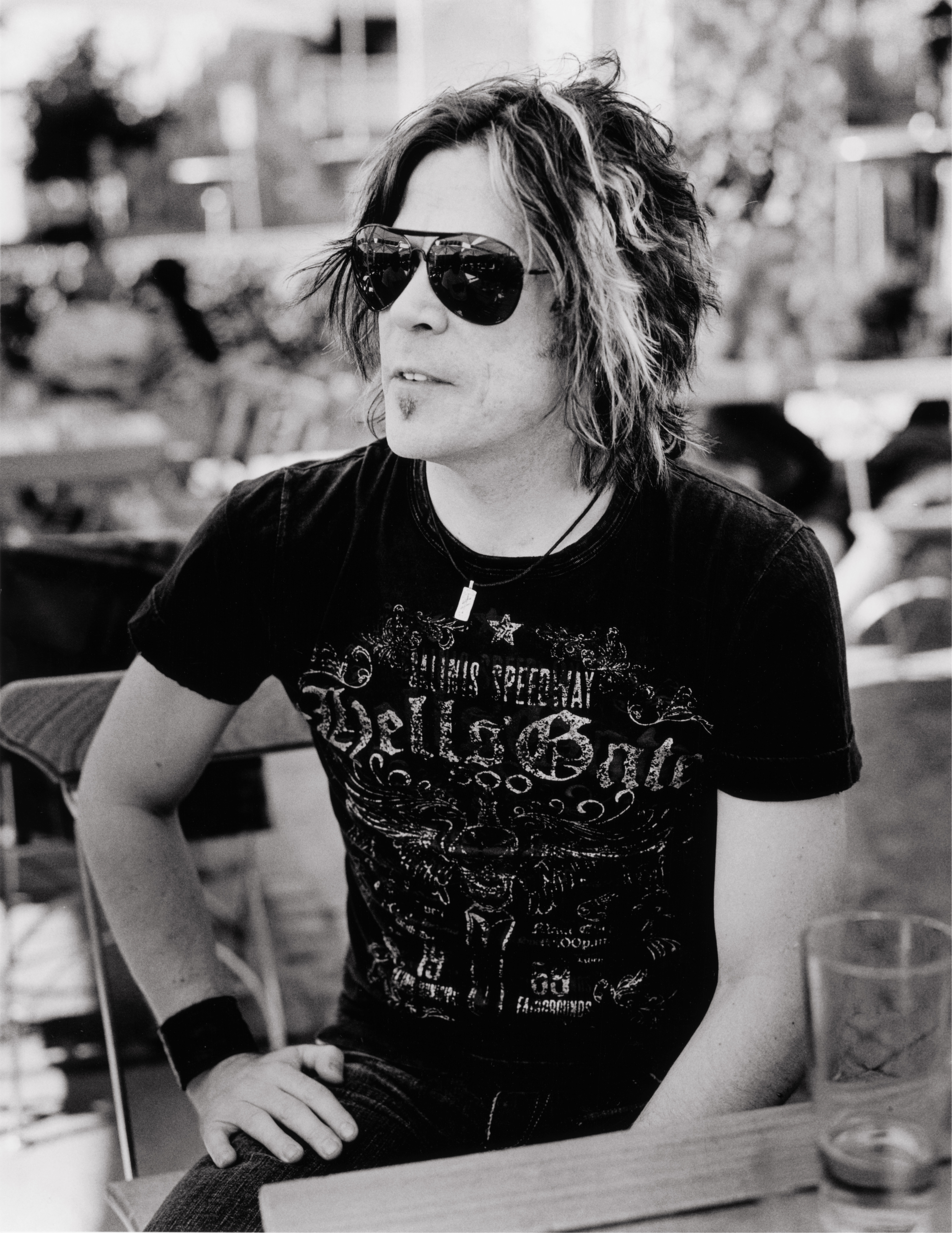
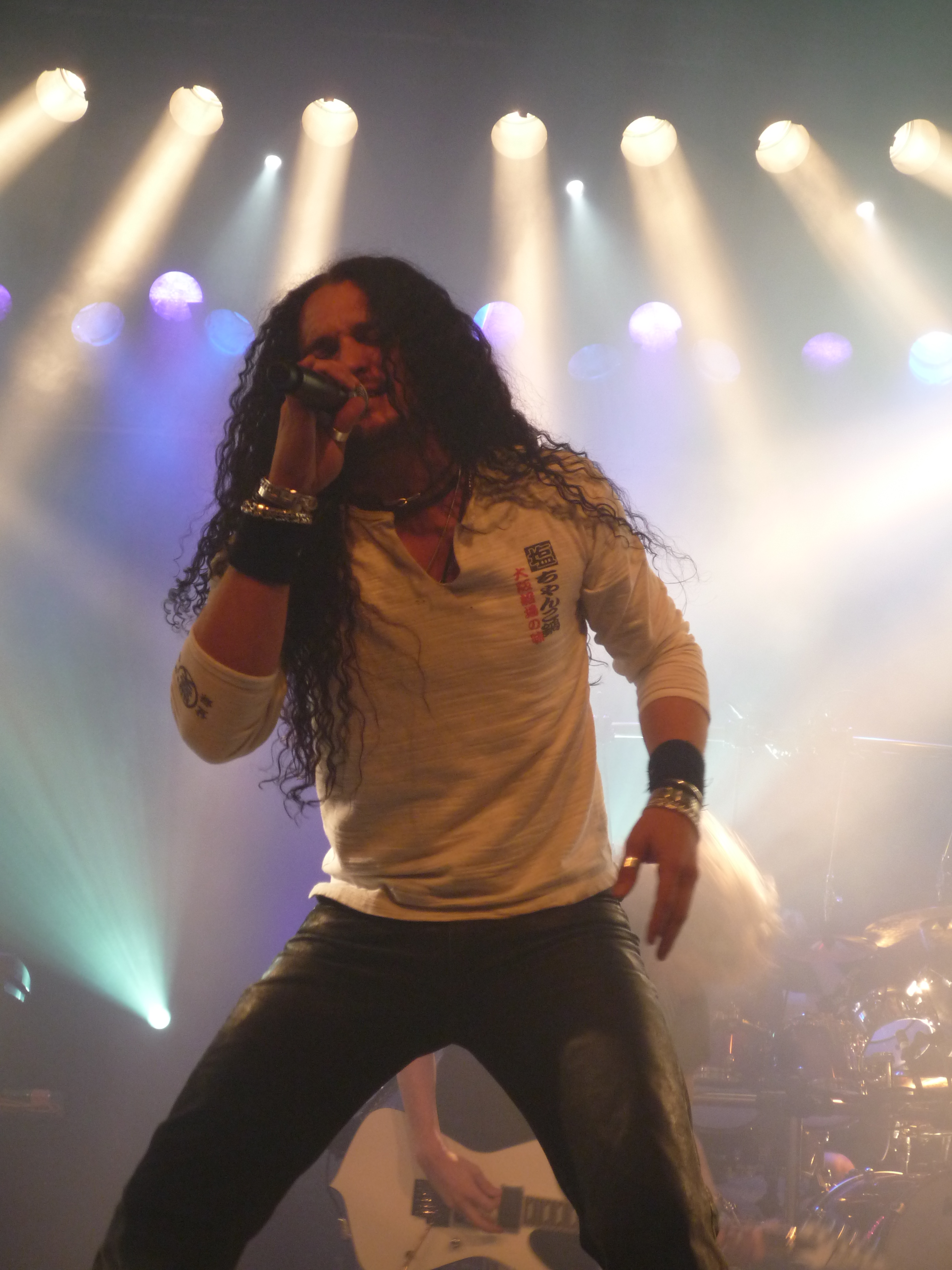
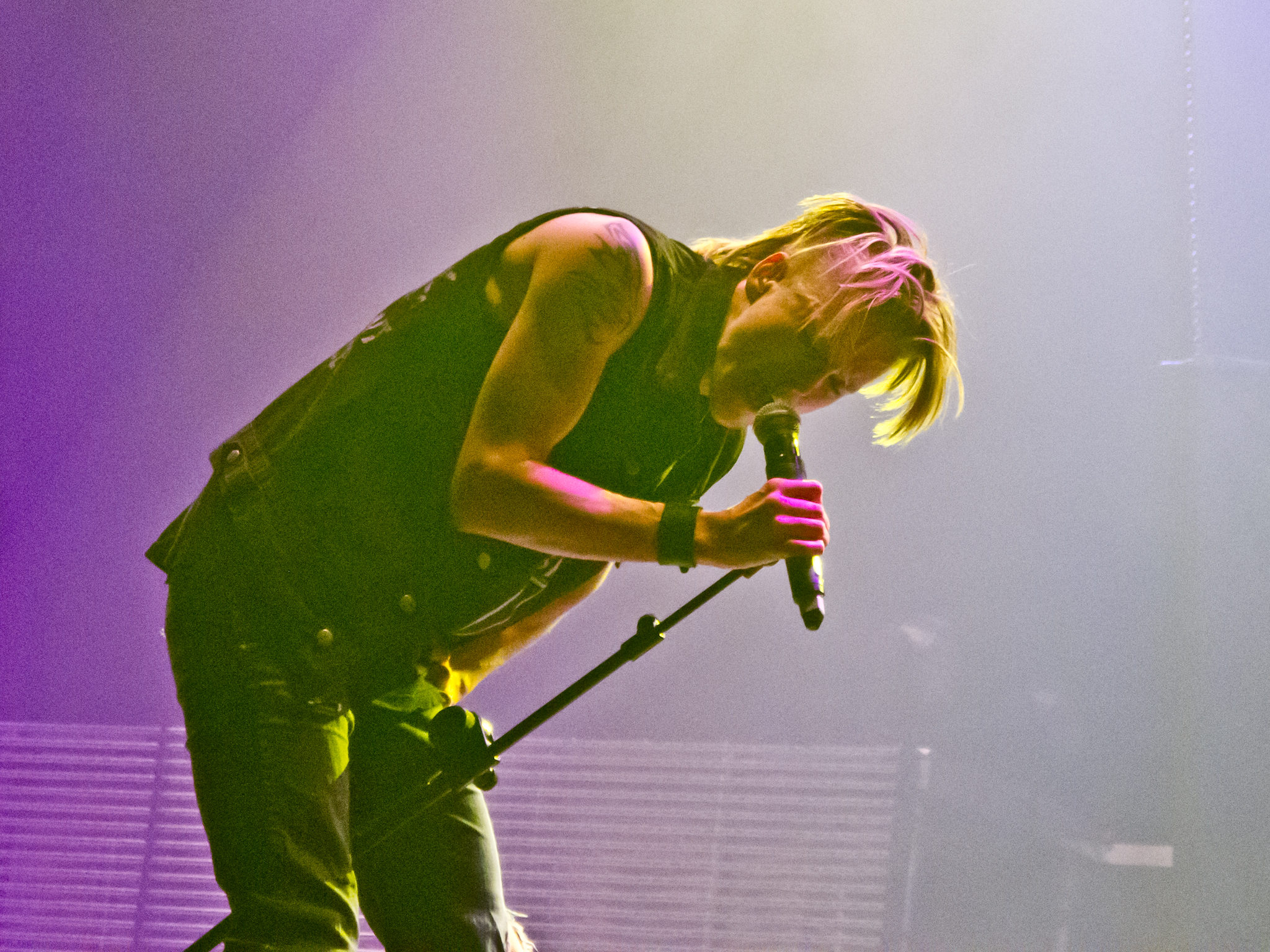
Following Johnny Solinger's dismissal in 2015, Skid Row had continued on with two different singers, first Tony Harnell and then ZP Theart, before Erik Grönwall (pictured below) joined the band in 2022 and left in 2024.

Harnell left Skid Row in December 2015, and former DragonForce vocalist ZP Theart was filling in as the lead singer for concerts in 2016. In January 2017, ZP Theart was named as an official member of the band. In March 2018, it was revealed the band's next release for the United World Rebellion trilogy would now be a full-length album and would be released sometime in 2019, however this did not eventuate.

In January 2019, a deluxe edition of Skid Row's self-titled debut album was released digitally, which included the original album remastered for the first time (with "Forever" added as a bonus track), as well as a recording of the band's April 28, 1989, performance at The Marquee in Westminster, California. The band members have stated that they had no input into the reissue.

In the summer of 2019, former Skid Row singer Sebastian Bach revealed plans to perform the band's self-titled debut album in its entirety on tour as a celebration of its 30th anniversary, and issued an open invitation for the band to play on stage with him for the first time since their split, hoping it would result in a proper Skid Row reunion with Bach. Guitarist Dave "Snake" Sabo declined the offer, while former drummer Rob Affuso subsequently confirmed that he would be joining Bach on stage during the tour.

On June 26, 2021, former vocalist Johnny Solinger died one month after revealing that he was suffering from liver failure.

In a February 2022 interview with The Music Universe, Sabo confirmed that the band's sixth studio album was expected to be released on September 16 (his 58th birthday), and added its single would be released "around the second [or] third week of March." On March 23, 2022, the band parted ways with ZP Theart. Erik Grönwall joined the band after Theart's departure. After Grönwall joined, the single "The Gang's All Here" premiered online. Their new album, The Gang's All Here, was released on October 14.

In March 2023, Sabo revealed that Skid Row has begun writing new material for their seventh studio album: "There's four potential songs for the next record already. And who knows whether they'll make it or not. We've never done that before. So that's kind of where everybody's head is at. We're really staying in the moment, but we're also utilizing this newfound energy, shall I say, to be really creative and productive."

May 2023 saw Skid Row attempt to embark on an Australian tour, however it was fraught with problems; the May 17 show in Brisbane was abruptly canceled minutes before the doors were to open, with Grönwall coming down with flu-like symptoms. The band was able to complete their Sydney tour date on the 19th, however Grönwall's symptoms worsened and eventually the whole tour ended up being postponed.

On March 27, 2024, after finishing the postponed shows, which ended in Sault Ste. Marie, Michigan, the band announced that they had parted ways with Grönwall due to health issues, and that several of their upcoming shows would feature Lzzy Hale on vocals. Hale performed four shows with Skid Row in the United States, but stated that she would not be joining the band full-time. On October 29, 2026, the band announced Justin Sargent as their new vocalist.

== Musical style ==
Skid Row's music employed heavy guitar riffs and hooks. Jeff Mezydlo of Yardbarker said: "Skid Row always walked a wobbly line between outright heavy metal – their Slave To The Grind album is probably the heaviest record in the hair metal canon – and radio-baiting cheese." "Sleazegrinder" of Louder wrote: "Hair metal was littered with flamboyant frontmen, but few were as out-spoken, controversial, and flat-out obnoxious as head-Skid Sebastian Bach." They are considered to be one of the final glam metal acts to achieve mainstream success before the scene was eclipsed by the arrival of grunge in the 1990s.

== Band members ==
Current members

- Dave "The Snake" Sabo – guitars, backing vocals (1986–1996, 1999–present)
- Rachel Bolan – bass, backing vocals (1986–1996, 1999–present)
- Scotti Hill – guitars, backing vocals (1987–1996, 1999–present)
- Rob Hammersmith – drums, backing vocals (2010–present)
- Justin Sargent – lead vocals (2026–present)

== Awards and nominations ==
- American Music Awards

Year	Nominated work	Award	Result
1990	Skid Row	Favorite Heavy Metal/Hard Rock New Artist	Won
1990	Skid Row	Favorite Heavy Metal/Hard Rock Album	Nominated

== Discography ==
Studio albums

- Skid Row (1989)
- Slave to the Grind (1991)
- Subhuman Race (1995)
- Thickskin (2003)
- Revolutions per Minute (2006)
- The Gang's All Here (2022)
