= 18 and Life =

1989 single by Skid Row

Single by Skid Row

from the album Skid Row
- B-side: "Midnight/Tornado"
- Released: June 16, 1989
- Genre: Glam metal; pop metal
- Length: 3:51
- Label: Atlantic
- Songwriters: Rachel Bolan; Dave Sabo
- Producer: Michael Wagener

Skid Row singles chronology
"Youth Gone Wild" (1989)	"18 and Life" (1989)	"I Remember You" (1989)

Music video
- "18 and Life" on YouTube

"18 and Life" is a song by American heavy metal band Skid Row. It was released in June 1989 as the second single from their self-titled debut album. The power ballad is the band's biggest hit, reaching No. 4 on the US Billboard Hot 100 and No. 11 on the Billboard Album Rock Tracks chart. It was certified gold by the Recording Industry Association of America (RIAA) on September 13, 1989, when it sold 500,000 copies. The song also charted at No. 12 on the UK Singles Chart, No. 6 in Canada, and No. 5 in Ireland.

In April 2015, Skid Row released a new version of the song with then-lead vocalist Tony Harnell.

== Theme ==
The title of the song alludes to its subject, 18-year-old Ricky, receiving a sentence of life imprisonment for the murder of another teen. The song paints Ricky's youth as his undoing. It was believed for a long time that guitarist Dave Sabo got the idea from a newspaper article about an 18-year-old named Ricky who was sentenced to life imprisonment for killing his friend with a gun that, due to alcohol, he most likely guessed was not loaded. However, in an interview with the Professor of Rock, Sabo states that the original inspiration was his brother Rick's life after coming home from Vietnam. The writing process eventually led the song to being about an accidental murder. The music video also alludes to this.

== Critical reception ==
Pan-European magazine Music & Media described single as "a dramatic hard rock ballad complete with raw vocals and spicy guitars" and left a verdict: "Powerful stuff."

== Personnel ==
- Sebastian Bach – vocals
- Dave Sabo – guitars
- Scotti Hill – guitars
- Rachel Bolan – bass
- Rob Affuso – drums

== Charts ==
=== Weekly charts ===
Chart (1989–1990)	Peak position
Canada Top Singles (RPM)	6
Europe (Eurochart Hot 100)	30
Ireland (IRMA)	5
New Zealand (Recorded Music NZ)	50
Sweden (Sverigetopplistan)	17
UK Singles (Official Charts)	12
US Billboard Hot 100	4
US Mainstream Rock (Billboard)	11

=== Year-end charts ===
Chart (1989)	Position
Canada Top Singles (RPM)	80
US Billboard Hot 100	61

== Certifications ==
Region	Certification	Certified units/sales
United States (RIAA)	Gold	500,000^{^}
^{^} Shipments figures based on certification alone.

== Release history ==
Region	Date	Format(s)	Label(s)	Ref.
United States	June 16, 1989	7-inch vinyl; cassette	Atlantic	
Japan	July 10, 1989	Mini-CD	Atlantic	
United Kingdom	January 22, 1990	7-inch vinyl; 12-inch vinyl; CD	Atlantic	
