= Rob Affuso =

American drummer (born 1963)

- Born: Robert James Affuso; March 1, 1963 (age 63)
- Origin: Newburgh, New York, U.S.
- Genres: Heavy metal, hard rock, glam metal
- Occupation: Drummer
- Years active: 1986–present
- Formerly of: Skid Row
- Website: skidrow.com soulsystemorchestras.com

Robert James Affuso (born March 1, 1963) is an American heavy metal drummer best known as a member of the band Skid Row from 1987 to 1996.

Affuso is currently the band leader and drummer for Soulsystem, a band he formed while touring with Skid Row in 1992. He also formed an entertainment company Soulsystem Orchestras Inc. in New York. Affuso played in the band Ozone Monday with several of his former Skid Row bandmates. He was not involved in Skid Row's 1999 reunion. He has said that he would not rejoin the band without former lead singer Sebastian Bach.

Affuso is the only former member that keeps in contact with all former Skid Row bandmates and is still good friends with them all. He met Dave "Snake" Sabo while auditioning for Bon Jovi in 1985.

He normally plays Pearl drums and Sabian Cymbals with Soulsystem, and also used them whilst with Skid Row.

He was also a member of the Sutton Thomas Band (Tom Gleason, Ken Anthony, Frank Perrego) prior to joining Skid Row. He also played on Gilby Clarke's debut solo album in 1994 and Guns N' Roses bassist, Duff McKagan's solo album. Affuso played on the debut album of Jill Hennessy (Crossing Jordan/Law & Order) in 2008. Affuso made his first appearance in years in the metal community on VH1's That Metal Show. He was a guest in the audience, where host Eddie Trunk asked him if he would accept a Skid Row reunion, which he replied by saying "absolutely."

He reunited with Skid Row onstage in 2002. He also appeared with Sebastian Bach live on August 25, 2011 and again in early September 2025 performing "I Remember You" both times.

In April 2015, Affuso joined the band Four by Fate, which features former Frehley's Comet members Tod Howarth and John Regan.
