= Dave Sabo =

American guitarist (born 1964)

Dave "Snake" Sabo
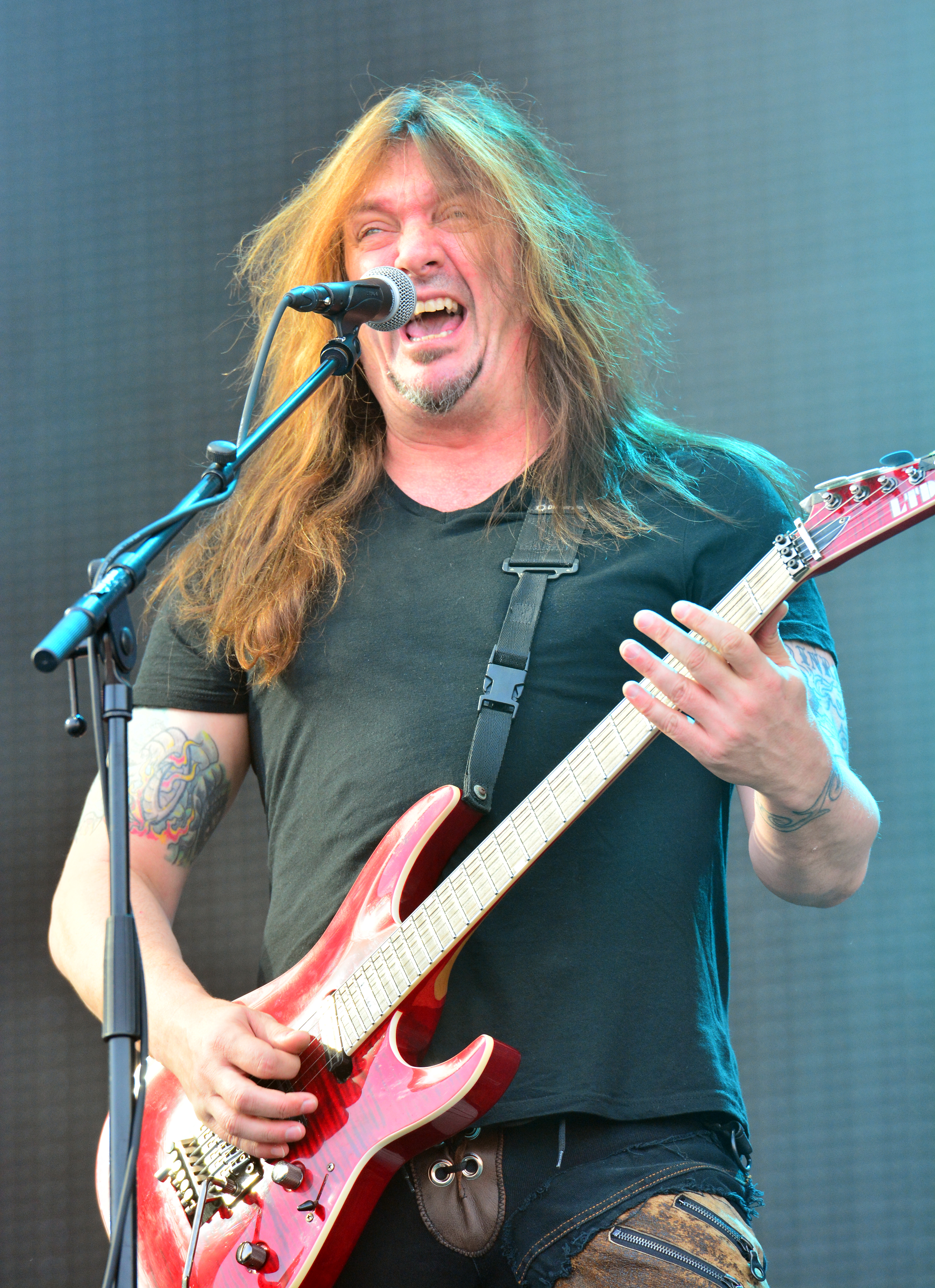
- Sabo performing with Skid Row in 2014

Background information
- Born: September 16, 1964 (age 61); Perth Amboy, New Jersey, U.S.
- Genres: Hard rock; heavy metal; glam metal
- Occupations: Musician; songwriter
- Instruments: Guitar
- Years active: 1978–present
- Member of: Skid Row
- Formerly of: Bon Jovi
- Website: skidrow.com

David Michael Sabo (born September 16, 1964), nicknamed Snake, is an American musician best known as one of the guitarists of heavy metal band Skid Row.

== Biography ==
=== Pre-Skid Row ===
Sabo was born in Perth Amboy, New Jersey, and grew up in nearby Sayreville, in the same neighborhood as childhood friend Jon Bon Jovi. His mother, Dorothy, raised him and his brothers as a single mother. Inspired by the likes of Kiss, Aerosmith, Judas Priest, Van Halen, Black Sabbath, as well as the Rolling Stones, Sabo began playing guitar at the age of 14 on a $40 Sears guitar his mother had purchased for his elder brother years earlier. His guitar teacher was Al Parinello, who also taught Jon Bon Jovi. Sabo was also a promising athlete, even being professionally scouted while a high school baseball player. Seeing Kiss play live as a teenager was the catalyst for Sabo to give up sports and focus on music full time.

Sabo's friendship with Jon Bon Jovi led to him becoming the original lead guitarist for Bon Jovi in 1983. Sabo took part in a short three-week tour to support a demo version of Bon Jovi's debut single "Runaway" which became a surprise New York City-area hit in 1983. Sabo's time in Bon Jovi was brief, and he was soon replaced by Richie Sambora as the band's lead guitarist. While working in Toms River, New Jersey, Sabo met local bassist Rachel Bolan and the pair agreed to form a band which would eventually become famous American rock band Skid Row.

=== Skid Row ===
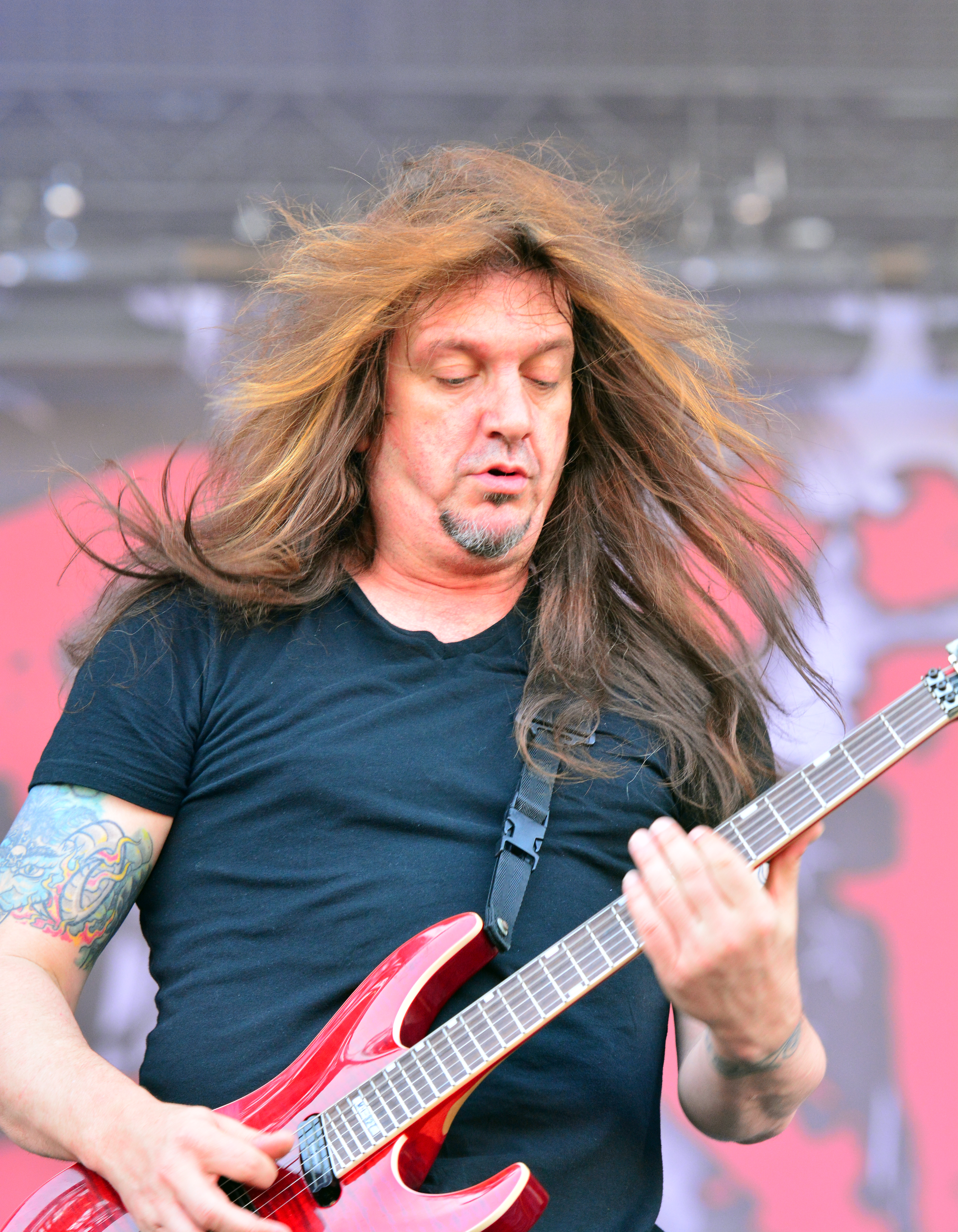
Sabo at Wacken Open Air 2014

Bolan and Sabo recruited guitarist Scotti Hill, drummer Rob Affuso and vocalist Matt Fallon and christened the new band Skid Row. Fallon was replaced by Sebastian Bach in 1987 and the band began playing shows in clubs throughout the eastern United States. With some help from childhood friend Jon Bon Jovi, Sabo was instrumental in securing a record deal for Skid Row with Atlantic. In 1989, the band released their debut album, Skid Row, which was an instant success. The record went multi-platinum and produced the hit singles "18 and Life", "I Remember You" and "Youth Gone Wild". Skid Row turned in a heavier direction on their double-platinum follow-up, the 1991 album "Slave to the Grind".

=== Other work ===
Sabo played lead guitar on "Trial of the Soul", a track by the band Kryst the Conqueror featuring former members of the Misfits as well as Jeff Scott Soto of the Yngwie Malmsteen band. Scott is credited under the pseudonym "Kryst the Conqueror" as he was under contract to Malmsteen and forced to remain anonymous.

Sabo was briefly a touring guitarist for Anthrax during their "Attack of the Killer A's" tour in early 2000.

== Family ==
Sabo is the uncle of former Association of Tennis Professionals player Matt Sabo.
