= Scotti Hill =

American guitarist (born 1964)

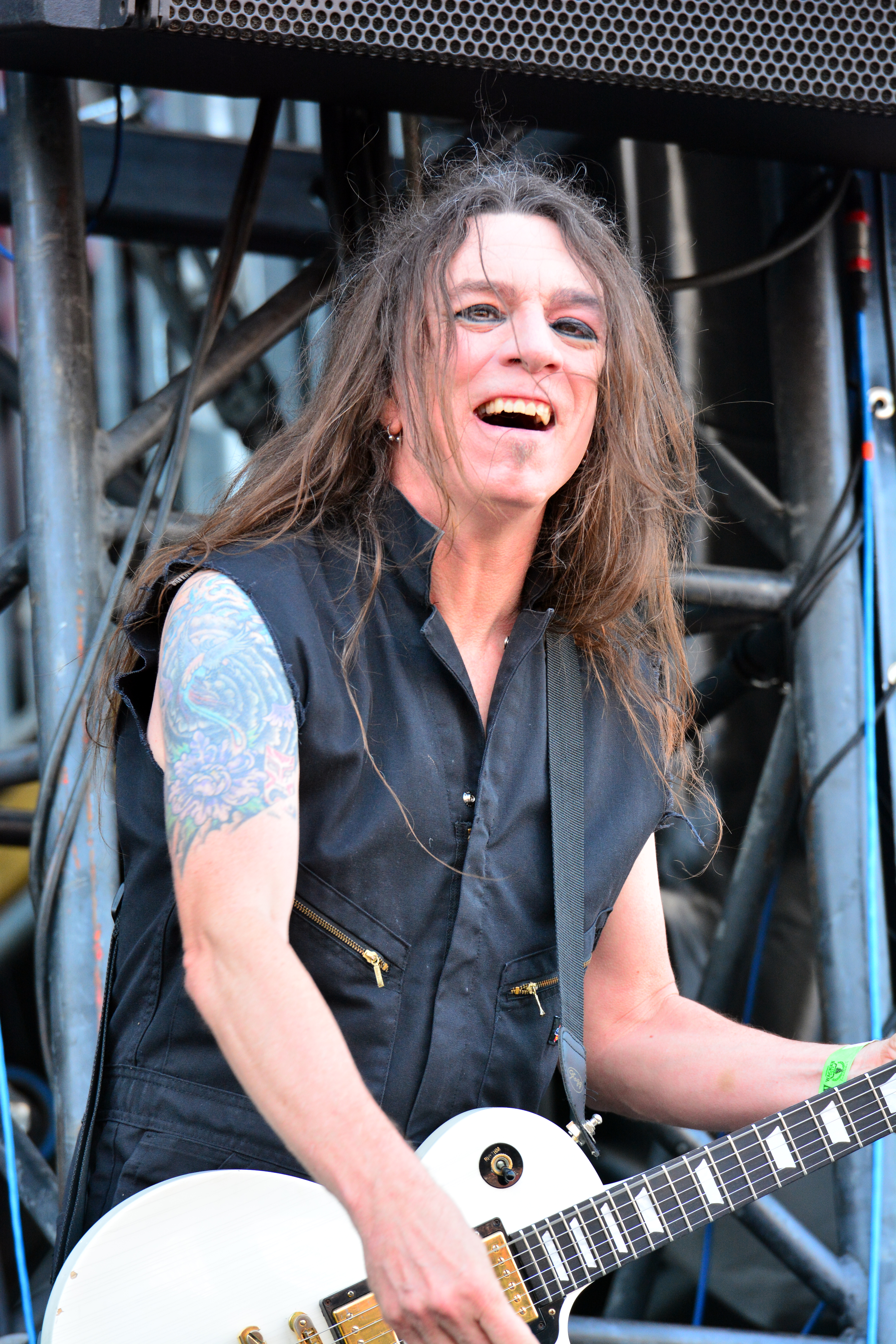
- Hill performing with Skid Row at Wacken Open Air 2014

Background information
- Born: Scott Lawrence Mulvehill; May 31, 1964 (age 62); Manhasset, New York, U.S.
- Genres: Heavy metal, hard rock
- Occupation: Guitarist
- Years active: 1985–present
- Member of: Skid Row
- Website: skidrow.com

Scotti Hill (born Scott Lawrence Mulvehill on May 31, 1964) is an American musician best known as a guitarist in the New Jersey heavy metal band Skid Row.

== Overview ==
Hill was also in the band Ozone Monday with singer Shawn McCabe, Skid Row members guitarist Dave "The Snake" Sabo and bassist Rachel Bolan and former Skid Row drummer Rob Affuso.
