= Rachel Bolan =

American bassist (born 1964)

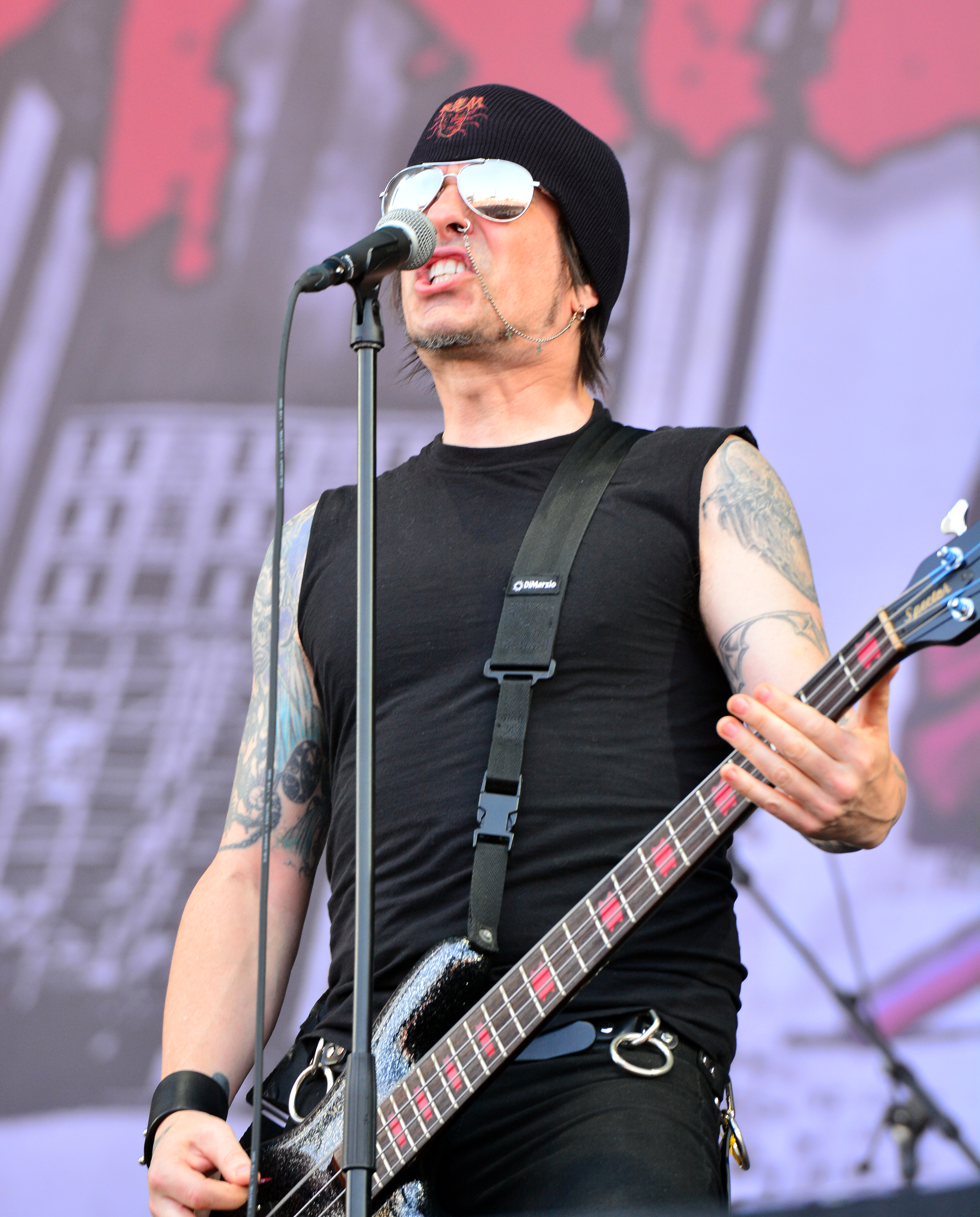
- Bolan performing with Skid Row at Wacken Open Air in 2014

Background information
- Born: James Richard Southworth; February 9, 1964 (age 62); Point Pleasant, New Jersey, U.S.
- Genres: Hard rock, heavy metal
- Occupations: Musician; songwriter; producer
- Instrument: Bass
- Years active: 1981–present
- Member of: Skid Row; Prunella Scales
- Website: skidrow.com

Rachel Bolan (born James Richard Southworth, February 9, 1964) is an American musician, best known as the bassist and main songwriter of the metal band Skid Row.

== Career ==
Bolan was born in 1964 to Aida and Hubert Southworth. He grew up in Toms River, New Jersey. The youngest of four children, Bolan is half Portuguese. When he was in junior high school he began considering a career in music after drummer Damian Cordisco asked him to play bass in his band. Bolan's first gig was in 1978 at Manasquan High School. Bolan credits Cordisco with opening his ears to music he had not heard, by artists such as Ramones, AC/DC, Joe Jackson, Sex Pistols, the Cars and Elvis Costello. Bolan graduated from Toms River High School East in 1982.

His stage name 'Rachel' is a hybrid of his brother's name, Richard, and his grandfather's name, Manuel. 'Bolan' is a tribute to one of his childhood idols, T. Rex frontman Marc Bolan. In 1990, Bolan legally changed his name to Rachel Bolan Southworth.

After high school, Bolan joined with Scotti Hill and other musicians to form a band named Godsend. In 1986, guitarist Dave "The Snake" Sabo was forming the band Darkness, and he brought Hill and Bolan into the band. They changed the band name to Skid Row in late 1986.

Bolan has appeared as a vocalist on two of Kiss guitarist Ace Frehley's solo albums and back-up vocals on Mötley Crüe's Dr. Feelgood album. He has produced numerous bands including Rockets to Ruin, the Luchagors in 2007 with former wrestler Amy "Lita" Dumas and Atlantic Records stoner metal band Godspeed. He formed the band Prunella Scales with Solace guitarist Tommy Southard and L. Wood. Prunella Scales released "Dressing Up the Idiot" on Mutiny Records in 1997. Jack Roberts (guitar) and Ray Kubian (drums), both from the New Jersey–based band Mars Needs Women, joined Prunella Scales for touring. He played the bass guitar for Stone Sour on the band's records House of Gold & Bones - Part 1 and House of Gold & Bones – Part 2 as a replacement for the departed bassist Shawn Economaki. He can also be seen playing bass in TRUSTcompany music video for the single "Heart in My Hands".

Bolan has another side project called the Quazimotors. He did this project with Skid Row drummer Rob Affuso, Jonathan Callicutt and Evil Jim Wright (guitarist for Spectremen, BigFoot, Road Hawgs).

In June 2026, Bolan released the album Gargoyle of the Garden State.

== Personal life ==
Bolan married longtime girlfriend Donna "Roxxi" Feldman on June 10, 1994, but they later divorced. He has no children.

He is a racecar hobbyist, and competes in high-performance go-karts, Legends Cars, Thunder Roadster, and Pro-Challenge series cars.
