= Damnocracy =

American heavy metal supergroup

- Damnocracy, the heavy metal supergroup - pictured left to right: Evan Seinfeld, Ted Nugent, Sebastian Bach, Jason Bonham, and Scott Ian

Background information
- Origin: United States
- Genres: Heavy metal
- Years active: 2006–2010
- Labels: VH1
- Members: Sebastian Bach; Ted Nugent; Scott Ian; Evan Seinfeld; Jason Bonham
- Website: Official website

Damnocracy was a heavy metal supergroup formed on, and for, the VH1 TV show Supergroup in 2006. The members of the band ultimately dubbed their band project Damnocracy. The five band members were known from bands like Skid Row, Anthrax, Biohazard or Bonham.

The band's assumed manager was Doc McGhee, who has managed the likes of Kiss, Scorpions, Mötley Crüe, and Night Ranger. He had previously worked with Sebastian Bach in the rock band Skid Row.

The band did not release any albums and disbanded in 2010. Its members continued to perform with their original bands or moved on to new projects.

== Band members ==
=== Sebastian Bach (vocals) ===
Former singer for the hard rock band Skid Row before embarking on a solo career. He also makes a living as an actor and television personality. Has appeared on many of VH1's programs, including their I Married... series, and Heavy: The Story of Metal.

=== Ted Nugent (lead guitar) ===
Former lead guitarist for The Amboy Dukes and Damn Yankees, he is most famous for his solo career. Some of his best known songs include "Stranglehold", "Free for All", "Dog Eat Dog", "Wang Dang Sweet Poontang", "Cat Scratch Fever", "Motor City Madhouse", "Great White Buffalo", "High Enough" and "Wango Tango". Often during the show, Scott Ian referred to how much he enjoyed working with Nugent, as Nugent was one of Ian's influences growing up.

=== Scott Ian (rhythm guitar) ===
Rhythm guitarist and founding member of the thrash metal band Anthrax, who are considered one of the "big four" of the genre. Anthrax still perform today, and Scott Ian has been a personality on various VH1 programs, including the I Love the 70s/80s/90s series. Ian is also a member of Stormtroopers of Death, one of the first crossover thrash bands who mixed thrash with hardcore punk.

=== Evan Seinfeld (bass) ===
Vocalist and bassist for the band Biohazard, as well as an actor, director and producer in the pornography business.

=== Jason Bonham (drums) ===
Son of late Led Zeppelin drummer John Bonham. He played drums in the bands Bonham, UFO and Foreigner.

== Premiere concert setlist ==
Following the TV series, the band performed at the Empire Ballroom in Las Vegas on March 5, 2006:

1. "Ace of Spades" (Motörhead)
2. "Free for All" (Ted Nugent)
3. "T.N.T." (AC/DC)
4. "Out on the Tiles" (Led Zeppelin)
5. "Only" (Anthrax)
6. "Take It Back" (Damnocracy original song)
7. "Punishment" (Biohazard)
8. "Stranglehold" (Ted Nugent)
9. "Sin City" (AC/DC)
10. "Youth Gone Wild" (Skid Row)
11. "Cat Scratch Fever" (Ted Nugent)
12. "Whole Lotta Love" (Led Zeppelin)
