= Doc McGhee =

American music manager

Doc McGhee (born September 5, 1950, in Chicago, as Harold Millard McGhee) is an American music manager, best known for working with hard rock bands Kiss, Bon Jovi and Mötley Crüe. The latter two groups experienced their rise to stardom under his management. He has also worked with Hootie & the Blowfish.

He was in a reality series for VH1 called Supergroup along with Scott Ian, Ted Nugent, Evan Seinfeld, Sebastian Bach and Jason Bonham. He was also seen on the AMC reality series 4th and Loud, which chronicled his, Gene Simmons', and Paul Stanley's roles as owners of the Los Angeles Kiss Arena Football League team.

== Moscow Music Peace Festival ==
In 1989, McGhee joined with Soviet musician and promotor Stas Namin to create the Moscow Music Peace Festival which brought together hard rock and metal bands from the United States, Europe and the Soviet Union to benefit programs to help drug addicts. The lineup consisted of Bon Jovi, Scorpions, Mötley Crüe, Skid Row, Gorky Park (the local Russian outfit), Ozzy Osbourne, and Cinderella. Aerosmith was also scheduled to perform there, but not only pulled out at the literal last minute, but also insisted their contribution, their rendition of The Doors' "Love Me Two Times", be lifted from the official Make A Difference album's final pressing, on the grounds of being suspicious as to where the money was actually going. Over 100,000 people attended and it was broadcast in 59 countries. The concert inspired one of the bands, the McGhee-managed Scorpions, to write the top-selling song Wind of Change. McGhee's life and involvement in the Festival is featured in episodes 5 and 6 of the podcast Wind of Change.

== Drug smuggling conviction ==
In November 1982, McGhee was arrested for contributing to the import of 20 tons of marijuana into North Carolina via shrimp boat. The 21-count indictment said that McGhee and the smugglers had the intent to distribute the marijuana. McGhee would have to serve 30 years in jail and be fined $140,000, but the possession-with-intent-to-sell charge was changed. Identified as a link between US smugglers and the Colombian drug suppliers (his soon-to-be-ex-business partner being none other than the infamous Noriega), McGhee pleaded guilty and was ordered to spend $250,000 and 3,000 hours dedicated to his Make a Difference Foundation, a non-profit aimed at deterring youth drug use. After the sentence, neither McGhee nor his office would comment on the sentencing.

== Bands managed ==
- Niteflyte (1978–1982)
- Pat Travers (1978–1981)
- Mötley Crüe (1982–1989)
- Bon Jovi (1984–1991)
- Guns N' Roses (2010–2011)
- Kiss (1995–2023)
- Skid Row (1988–)
- The Front (1989–1994)
- Hootie & the Blowfish
- Lovehammers
- Scorpions
- Benise
- Jypsi (2007–2010)
- Nico Vega (2009–2010)
- Night Ranger (2007–)
- Crooked X (2007–2008)
- Vintage Trouble (2010–)
- TNT
- Drew Davis Band
- Down
- Chasin' Crazy (2015–2016)

== Solo artists managed ==
- Bonnie McKee (2004–2009)
- Cheyenne Kimball (2007–)
- Darius Rucker
- Ted Nugent
- Paul Stanley
- Sacha Edwards
- Bob Schneider
- Richie Sambora
- Yoshiki
- Orianthi
- Mallary Hope

== Discography ==
Year	Title	Credits
1979	Niteflyte – Niteflyte	executive producer
1982	Pat Travers – Black Pearl	management
1983	Mötley Crüe – Shout at the Devil	management
1984	Bon Jovi – Bon Jovi	management
1985	Bon Jovi – 7800° Fahrenheit	management
1985	Mötley Crüe – Theatre of Pain	direction
1986	The Unforgiven – The Unforgiven	direction
1986	Bon Jovi – Slippery When Wet	management
1987	Mötley Crüe – Girls, Girls, Girls	management
1988	Bon Jovi – New Jersey	management
1989	Skid Row – Skid Row	management
1989	Mötley Crüe – Dr. Feelgood	management
1989	Stairway to Heaven/Highway to Hell	executive producer
1990	Scorpions – Crazy World	management
1991	Richie Sambora – Stranger in This Town	management
1993	Scorpions – Face the Heat	management
1994	Roger Taylor and Yoshiki – Foreign Sand	executive producer
1994	Roger Taylor – Happiness?	executive producer
1995	God Street Wine – $1.99 Romances	A&R
1998	Kiss – Psycho Circus	management
2003	Kiss – Kiss Symphony: Alive IV	Kiss management
2011	Night Ranger – Somewhere in California	management
