= So Fine (Howard Johnson song) =

Single by Howard Johnson

from the album Keepin' Love New
- B-side: "This Is Heaven"
- Released: 1982
- Genre: Boogie
- Length: 5:30
- Label: A&M (SP-12048)
- Songwriter: Kashif
- Producers: Kashif, Morrie Brown, Paul Lawrence Jones

Howard Johnson singles chronology
"So Fine" (1982)	"Say You Wanna" (1982)

"So Fine" is a 1982 single by former Niteflyte member Howard Johnson, released in 1982 as a single from his debut album Keepin' Love New. Fonzi Thornton provided vocals on the single. A music video for the single featured dancers that also appeared on Soul Train and Solid Gold.

The single topped the Dance Club Songs chart for one week. It was a Top 10 hit on the Hot Black Singles chart, peaking at No. 6. It bubbled under the Hot 100, peaking at No. 105. In September 1982, the single reached number 45 in the UK Singles Chart, where it remained for 6 weeks.

== Track listing ==
12" vinyl

- US: A&M / SP-12048

Side A
No.	Title	Length
1.	"So Fine"	5:32

Side B
No.	Title	Length
1.	"This Is Heaven"	5:22

== Charts ==
=== Weekly charts ===
Chart (1982–1983)	Peak position
US Bubbling Under Hot 100 (Billboard)	105
US Dance Club Songs (Billboard)	1
US Hot R&B/Hip-Hop Songs (Billboard)	6
UK Singles (OCC)	45

=== Year-end charts ===
Chart (1982)	Position
US Hot R&B/Hip-Hop Songs (Billboard)	40
