= 4th and Loud =

American reality television series

- Genre: Reality
- Original language: English
- No. of seasons: 1
- No. of episodes: 10

Production
- Production company: ThinkFactory Media

Original release
- Network: AMC
- Release: August 12 – October 17, 2014

4th and Loud is an American reality television series that debuted August 12, 2014, on the AMC cable network. The series chronicles Rock and Roll Hall of Famers Gene Simmons and Paul Stanley (of the rock band Kiss) as they establish their new Arena Football League franchise, the Los Angeles Kiss, and try to bring their vision to the sport. The AMC network announced that it would not renew the series for a second season, as the network was planning to move away from reality shows to focus more on its scripted programming.

== Cast ==
- Gene Simmons – Co-owner
- Paul Stanley – Co-owner
- Doc McGhee – Kiss manager
- Brett Bouchy – Co-owner
- Schuyler Hoversten – Team president
- Bob McMillen – Head coach
- Bruno Silva – Head Athletic Trainer
- Colt Brennan – Quarterback
- Scott Bailey – Director of player personnel
- J. J. Raterink – Quarterback
- Beau Bell – Linebacker
- B. J. Bell – Defensive linemen
- Russell Shaw – Assistant coach
- Grady Tucker, Jr. – Assistant coach
- Walt Housman – Defensive coordinator

== Episodes ==
No.	Title	Original release date
1	"A New Arena"	August 12, 2014
2	"Under Pressure"	August 19, 2014
3	"History Begins"	August 26, 2014
4	"The Fall Guy"	September 2, 2014
5	"Changing of the Guard"	September 9, 2014
6	"Paranoid Activity"	September 16, 2014
7	"Marked Man"	September 23, 2014
8	"Prodigal Son Returns"	September 30, 2014
9	"Boiling Over"	October 8, 2014
10	"Day of Reckoning"	October 14, 2014
