= Child Within the Man =

Studio album by Sebastian Bach
- Released: May 10, 2024
- Studio: Studio Barbarosa (Orlando, Florida)
- Genre: Heavy metal, hard rock
- Length: 47:35
- Label: Reigning Phoenix Music
- Producer: Michael Baskette

Sebastian Bach chronology
Give 'Em Hell (2014)	Child Within the Man (2024)

Singles from Child Within the Man
- 1. "What Do I Got to Lose?" Released: 2023; 2. "Everybody Bleeds" Released: 2024; 3. "(Hold On) to the Dream" Released: 2024; 4. "Freedom" Released: 2024; 5. "Future of Youth" Released: 2024; 6. "To Live Again" Released: 2025

Professional ratings
Review scores
Source	Rating
Kerrang!	3/5 stars
Maximum Volume Music	9/10 stars
Metal Temple	10/10 stars
The Rockpit	8/10 stars

Child Within the Man is the sixth studio album by heavy metal singer Sebastian Bach, released on May 10, 2024, by Reigning Phoenix Music. It marks his return after a decade-long hiatus since Give 'Em Hell in 2014. The album blends powerful heavy metal tracks with hard rock influences, showcasing Bach's iconic vocal prowess and lyrical depth.

== Track listing ==
No.	Title	Writer(s)	Length
1.	"Everybody Bleeds"	Sebastian Bach, Devin Bronson, Isaac Carpenter, Michael Elvis Baskette	4:26
2.	"Freedom"	Sebastian Bach, John 5, Michael Elvis Baskette	3:09
3.	"(Hold On) to the Dream"	Sebastian Bach, Devin Bronson, Isaac Carpenter, Michael Elvis Baskette	5:02
4.	"What Do I Got to Lose?"	Sebastian Bach, Myles Kennedy	4:49
5.	"Hard Darkness"	Sebastian Bach, Devin Bronson	4:22
6.	"Future of Youth"	Sebastian Bach, Orianthi, Devin Bronson, Michael Elvis Baskette	3:45
7.	"Vendetta"	Sebastian Bach, Devin Bronson, Isaac Carpenter, Michael Elvis Baskette	4:01
8.	"F.U."	Sebastian Bach, Steve Stevens	4:39
9.	"Crucify Me"	Sebastian Bach, Devin Bronson, Michael Elvis Baskette	4:23
10.	"About to Break"	Sebastian Bach, Devin Bronson, Brent Woods	4:11
11.	"To Live Again"	Sebastian Bach, Myles Kennedy, Devin Bronson, Isaac Carpenter, Michael Elvis Baskette	4:52

== Personnel ==
Primary musicians

- Sebastian Bach – vocals
- Devin Bronson – guitars
- Todd Kerns – bass
- Jeremy Colson – drums

Featured guests

- John 5 – lead guitar (track 2)
- Orianthi – lead guitar (track 6)
- Steve Stevens – lead guitar (track 8)

Production personnel

- Michael Elvis Baskette – production, mixing
- Bob Ludwig – mastering
- Jef Moll – engineering
- Josh Saldate – assistant engineering
- David Bierk – artwork, photography
- Gerardo Martinez – project manager, A&R

== Charts ==
Chart (2024)	Peak position
Scottish Albums (OCC)	35
UK Rock & Metal Albums (OCC)	3
UK Independent Albums (OCC)	11
US Billboard 200	44
