= Heavy: The Story of Metal =

2006 four-part documentary special

- Genre: Documentary
- Directed by: Michael John Warren
- Narrated by: Matt Pinfield
- Country of origin: United States
- Original language: English
- No. of episodes: 4

Production
- Executive producers: Matt Maranz; Brad Abramson; Michael Hirschorn; Shelly Tatro
- Producers: Thomas Coppola (episodes 1 & 4); Eliza Kurtz (episodes 2 & 4); Mike Stivala (episode 3)
- Editors: Eliza Kurtz (eps. 2 & 4); Jim Fabio; John Laprade (eps. 2 & 4); Mike Long (eps. 2–3); Mark Phelan (eps. 1 & 3–4); Michael John Warren (eps. 1 & 3)
- Running time: 41–43 min.
- Production company: 441 Productions

Original release
- Network: VH1
- Release: May 22 – May 25, 2006

Heavy: The Story of Metal is a four-part documentary special that aired on VH1 from May 22 to 25, 2006.

The series focuses on the origins, subgenres and the bands of heavy metal music, paying close attention to influential bands like Black Sabbath, Led Zeppelin, Judas Priest and Iron Maiden, who helped to define heavy metal in its early years. Other bands on the program include Alice Cooper, Kiss, AC/DC, Van Halen, Europe, Def Leppard, Quiet Riot, Mötley Crüe, Megadeth, Metallica, Anthrax, Guns N' Roses and Marilyn Manson. However, the documentary notably passes over lower profile metal subgenres such as death metal, black metal, doom metal, progressive metal, power metal and many others considered core elements of today's metal pantheon, focusing mostly on hard rock and traditional heavy metal. The documentary aired in Canada on MuchMoreMusic and on C4 in New Zealand. It is not available on DVD or video.

== Summary ==
The show is broken down into four parts. Each part focuses on different eras of the genre.

== Episodes ==
No.	Title	Original release date
1	"Welcome to My Nightmare"	May 22, 2006
This part of the documentary talks about the beginning of heavy metal music and how the term came about. It also documents punk rock's threat to heavy metal's popularity. Artists discussed include Black Sabbath, Led Zeppelin, Alice Cooper, Kiss, and AC/DC.
2	"British Steel"	May 23, 2006
This part focuses on the rise of the new wave of British heavy metal, the Soundhouse in London and the beginning of the L.A. scene with Van Halen. It also talks about Ronnie James Dio's influence on the birth of the "devil horns" and metal's leather fashion brought on by Rob Halford. Artists discussed include Judas Priest, Iron Maiden, Van Halen, and Def Leppard.
3	"Looks That Kill"	May 24, 2006
The third part focuses mostly on the glam metal movement of the 80s, the use of keyboards in metal, the "power ballad", and the decline of the genre. It also talks about the P.M.R.C hearings, the 1984 film This is Spinal Tap and the 1988 "rockumentary" The Decline of Western Civilization Part II: The Metal Years. Only two bands were discussed in this episode (Mötley Crüe, and Quiet Riot), while most of the episode focuses on glam metal's effects to the music industry.
4	"Seek & Destroy"	May 25, 2006
This part talks about the emergence of the underground sound of thrash metal in the 80's and the popularity of Guns N' Roses. It also talks about the popularity rise in nu metal, the influence of Marilyn Manson, and the beginning of Ozzfest. The documentary ends with saying how heavy metal has entered a "golden age" of sorts, with many classic bands returning to the stage and performing once again. Bands discussed include Metallica, Anthrax and Guns N' Roses.

== Interviews ==
The documentary features interviews from several heavy metal singers, musicians, authors, journalists, DJs, music historians, VJs, and record producers.

- Sebastian Bach
- Gavin Baddeley
- Geoff Barton
- Frankie Banali
- Frank Bello
- Nina Blackwood
- Greg Burke
- Geezer Butler
- Jerry Cantrell
- Richard Christy
- Alice Cooper
- Ian Christie
- Phil Collen
- Shawn "Clown" Crahan
- Stephen Davis
- Bruce Dickinson
- Ronnie James Dio
- Malcolm Dome
- K.K. Downing
- Kevin DuBrow
- Fred Durst
- Chuck Eddy
- Dave Ellefson
- Ace Frehley
- Jay Jay French
- David Fricke
- Rob Halford
- Ian Hill
- Glenn Hughes
- Scott Ian
- Tony Iommi
- Chris Jericho
- Joey Jordison
- Neal Kay
- Lemmy Kilmister
- Kerry King
- Chuck Klosterman
- David Konow
- Jani Lane
- Blackie Lawless
- Tommy Lee
- Doc McGhee
- Bret Michaels
- David Murray
- Dave Mustaine
- Vinnie Paul
- Stephen Pearcy
- Riki Rachtman
- Jack Russell
- Evan Seinfeld
- Nikki Sixx
- Slash
- Snake Sabo
- Adrian Smith
- Dee Snider
- Penelope Spheeris
- Geoff Tate
- Glenn Tipton
- Brad Tolinski
- Robert Trujillo
- Eddie Trunk
- Brian Turner
- Lars Ulrich
- Zakk Wylde
- Rob Zombie

== See also ==
- Metal: A Headbanger's Journey, a similar 2005 documentary film by Sam Dunn.
- Metal Evolution, a similar 2011-2012 VH1 series, also by Dunn.
