= Niteflyte (1979 album) =

Studio album by Niteflyte
- Released: 1979
- Recorded: 1979
- Studio: Quadradial Cinema Corp.; Bayshore Recording Studios; Sound Studios; Record Plant; Paragon Studios
- Genre: R&B, funk, soul
- Label: Ariola Records
- Producer: Barry Mraz; Sandy Torano

Niteflyte chronology
Niteflyte (1979)	Niteflyte (1981)

Singles from Niteflyte
- 1. "If You Want It" Released: 1979; 2. "All About Love" Released: 1979

Niteflyte is the debut self-titled album by Niteflyte, released in 1979 on Ariola Records.

The album peaked at No. 59 on Billboard's Top Soul LPs chart. "If You Want It" is the band's only top 40 entry on Billboard's Hot 100 and Hot Soul Singles charts, peaking at No. 37 and No. 21, respectively.

== Track listing ==
Side A
No.	Title	Writer(s)	Length
1.	"All About Love"	Torano	4:43
2.	"If You Want It"	Johnson, Torano	4:31
3.	"Sunshine"	Alexander	5:55
4.	"Make It Right"	Alexander	5:17

Side B
No.	Title	Writer(s)	Length
5.	"Get On the Fun"	Johnson	4:24
6.	"Tryin' to Find"	Alexander	5:22
7.	"I Wonder"	Torano	3:23
8.	"Easy Come"	Johnson	6:10
9.	"No Two Alike"	Torano	4:11

== Personnel ==
Niteflyte

- Howard Johnson – percussion, lead and backing vocals
- Sandy Torano – guitar, lead and backing vocals

Additional musicians

- Hamish Stuart – guitar, backing vocals
- Phyllis Hyman – backing vocals
- Frank Cornelius – bass
- Frank Garvis – bass
- Lamont Johnson – bass
- Cedrick Wright – drums
- Joe Galdo – drums
- Steve Ferrone – drums
- Jack Waldman – keyboards
- Richie Puente – percussion
- Rubens Bassini – percussion
- Angelo di Braccio – saxophone
- David Sanborn – saxophone
- Bob Schumacher – saxophone
- Michael Brecker – saxophone
- Randy Brecker – trumpet

Production

- Producer: Barry Mraz, Sandy Torano
- Photography: John Hamagami

== Charts ==
Album

Year	Chart	Position
1979	Billboard Top Soul LPs	59

Singles

Year	Single	Chart	Position
1979	"If You Want It"	Billboard Hot 100	37
1979	"If You Want It"	Billboard Hot Soul Singles	21
1980	"All About Love"	Billboard Hot Soul Singles	97
