= Keepin' Love New =

Studio album by Howard Johnson
- Released: 1982
- Recorded: 1982
- Genre: Post-disco, R&B
- Label: A&M Records
- Producer: Kashif; Morrie Brown; Paul Laurence

Howard Johnson chronology
| Keepin' Love New (1982) | Doin' It My Way (1983) |

Singles from Keepin' Love New
- 1. "So Fine" Released: 1982; 2. "Say You Wanna" Released: 1982; 3. "Keepin' Love New" Released: 1982

Professional ratings
Review scores
| Source | Rating |
|---|---|
| AllMusic | 3/5 stars |

Keepin' Love New is the debut album by former Niteflyte member Howard Johnson, released in 1982 on A&M Records.

The album is Howard Johnson's only US Billboard 200 entry, peaking at No. 122. "So Fine" is a chart-topper on the Dance Club Songs chart and a Top 10 hit on the Hot Black Singles chart, peaking at No. 6.

== Track listing ==
Side A
| No. | Title | Writer(s) | Length |
|---|---|---|---|
| 1. | "So Fine" | Kashif | 5:32 |
| 2. | "Take Me Through The Night" | Paul Laurence | 3:50 |
| 3. | "This Is Heaven" | Morrie Brown | 5:22 |
| 4. | "Jam Song" | Freddie Jackson, Paul Laurence | 3:48 |

Side B
| No. | Title | Writer(s) | Length |
|---|---|---|---|
| 5. | "Keepin' Love New" | Kashif | 4:05 |
| 6. | "So Glad You're My Lady" | Kashif, Paul Laurence | 4:35 |
| 7. | "Say You Wanna" | Kashif | 4:44 |
| 8. | "Forever Falling In Love" | Paul Laurence | 4:16 |

== Charts ==
Album

| Year | Chart | Position |
|---|---|---|
| 1982 | US Billboard 200 | 122 |

Singles

| Year | Single | Chart | Position |
|---|---|---|---|
| 1982 | "So Fine" | US Billboard Bubbling Under Hot 100 | 105 |
| 1982 | "So Fine" | US Billboard Hot Black Singles | 6 |
| 1982 | "So Fine" | US Billboard Dance Club Songs | 1 |
| 1982 | "So Fine" | UK Singles | 45 |
| 1982 | "Keepin' Love New" | US Billboard Hot Black Singles | 47 |
