= Phil Soussan =

British bassist (born 1961)

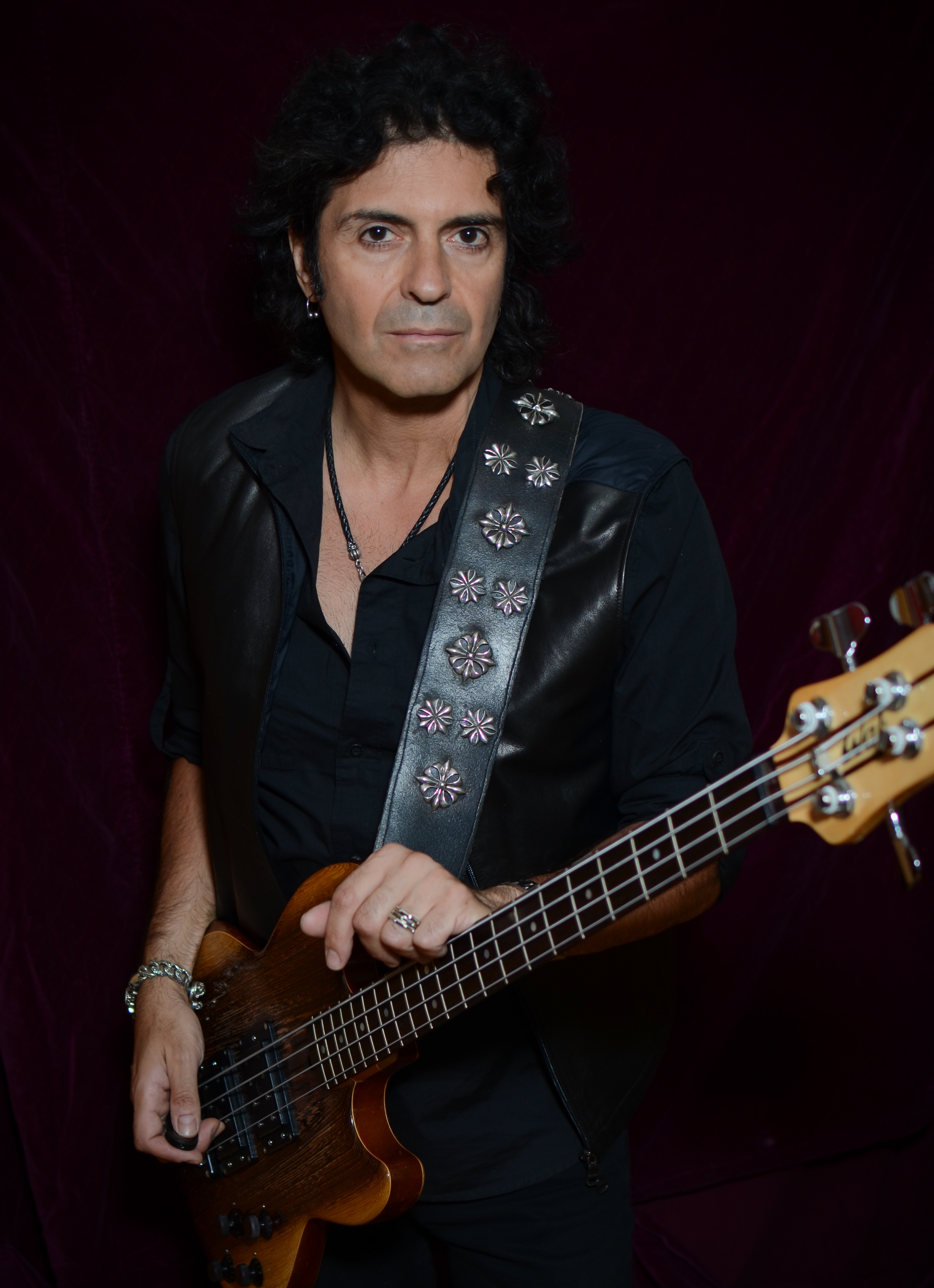
- Soussan in 2014

Background information
- Born: Philip Raphael Soussan; 23 June 1961 (age 65); Paddington London, England
- Genres: Hard rock, heavy metal
- Occupations: Musician, songwriter, record producer, chef
- Instrument: Bass guitar
- Years active: 1981–present
- Member of: Last in Line; The *uckers
- Formerly of: Wildlife, Ozzy Osbourne, Billy Idol, Vince Neil Band, Johnny Hallyday, John Waite, Big Noize
- Website: philsoussan.com

Philip Raphael Soussan (born 23 June 1961) is an English bass guitarist, songwriter and producer, known as a member of the rock bands Last in Line, Ozzy Osbourne, Vince Neil Band and Big Noize, as well as writing and producing for Dokken and Toto.

== Career ==
With Ozzy Osbourne, Soussan played on the 1986 album The Ultimate Sin and co-wrote the hit single "Shot in the Dark". He toured with Ozzy through the entire "Ultimate Sin" tour.

After leaving Ozzy in 1988 he accepted an invitation to be included in a new band for Billy Idol until 1990. He is featured on the Charmed Life album.

Soussan initially played with Vince Neil in the fictional band Black Plague, formed for the movie The Adventures of Ford Fairlane with Andrew Dice Clay; subsequently he was asked by Vince and his manager at the time, Bruce Bird, to write songs, put together a band and ultimately record songs for what would become the new Vince Neil Band. These songs became the basis of the band's first official album Exposed released in 1993.

As a songwriter, Soussan has contributed to all of the bands that he has been with, most notably co-writing five of the eleven songs on Exposed - the first solo album for Vince Neil following his departure from Mötley Crüe, co-writing half of the solo Luke album for Steve Lukather and co-writing "After You're Gone", the opening track to the Toto album Mindfields.

As a producer and mixer, Soussan has worked on many projects including Dokken's "Live from the Sun" CD and surround sound DVD, various Toto tracks and recordings as well as productions and recordings for many other artists and bands.

In 2006, Soussan released his debut solo album, Vibrate, featuring him singing and playing both guitar and bass on original material. His second solo album, No Protection, followed in 2011 with Soussan playing predominantly all instruments. Songs from both albums have been included in feature films.

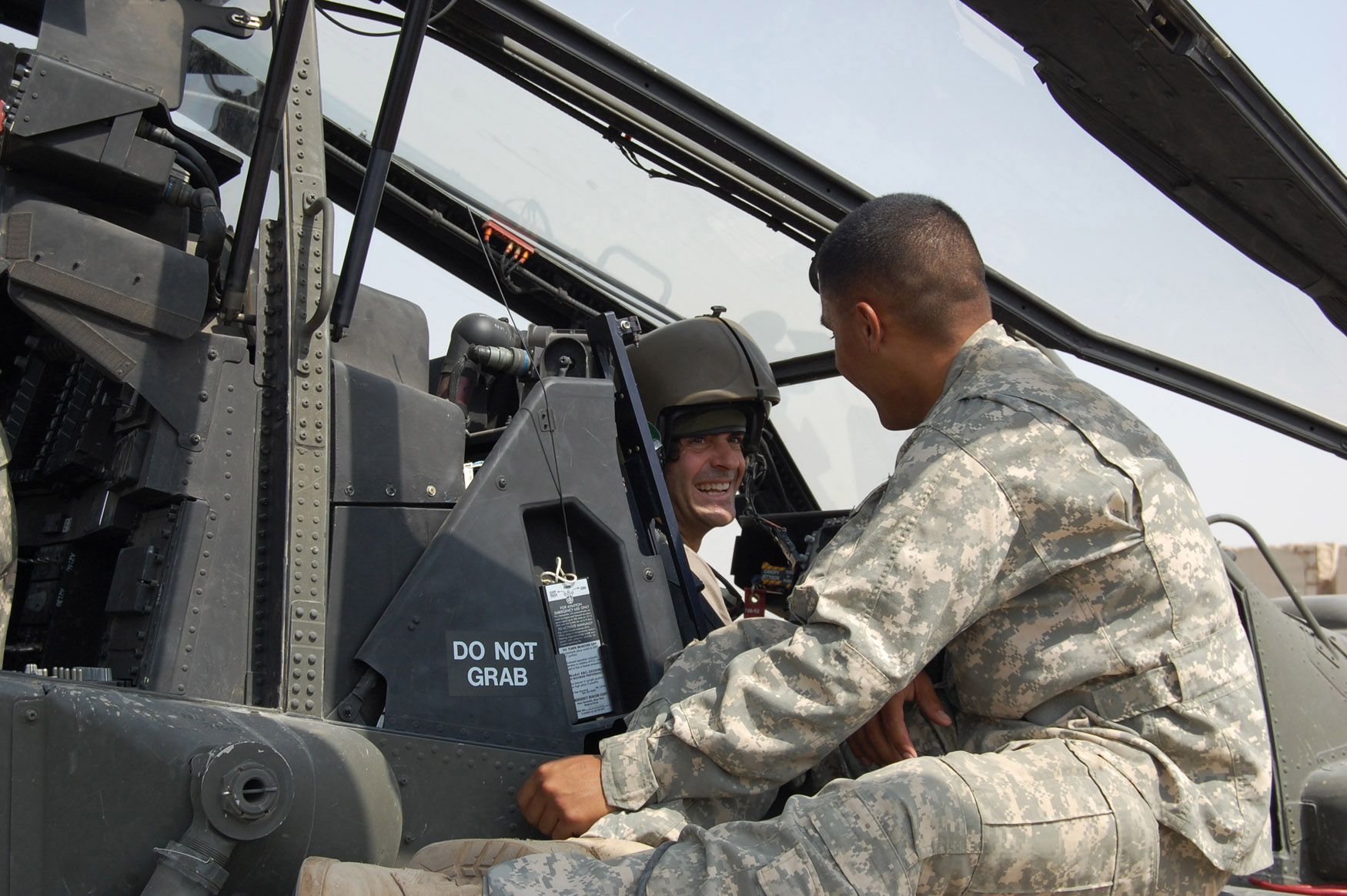
Soussan with Big Noize in Iraq, 2008.

Soussan was a member of the supergroup Big Noize along with singer Joe Lynn Turner, guitarist Carlos Cavazo, and drummer Vinny Appice. The group has since included keyboardists Gary Corbett and Teddy Andreadis, drummer Simon Wright, guitarist George Lynch and singer Sebastian Bach.

Soussan has had roles in several films; as part of the band Black Plague in The Adventures of Ford Fairlane, as himself in Rumble: The Indians Who Rocked the World and The Life Blood and Rhythm of Randy Castillo.

Outside of the immediate music scene, Soussan became elected to the Grammys, also known as NARAS, as a Board Member in 2007. In 2008, Soussan became Chairman of the Advocacy committee and in 2011 he was elected Vice President of the Grammys in the Los Angeles chapter, a position he held for two full terms.

After organizing the MusicCares grass roots "Giving 2010" benefit funding event funding he performed on 3 May 2010, For this Soussan formed the cover band "Carnival of Dogs" with Matt Sorum (Velvet Revolver, Camp Freddy, formerly of Guns N' Roses and The Cult), Franky Perez (Solo, Scars on Broadway, DKFXP) and Tracii Guns (L.A. Guns, formerly of Brides of Destruction). John Waite also made a guest vocal appearance.

Between 2016 and 2019, Soussan regularly appeared as a featured artist in the Raiding the Rock Vault musical show in Las Vegas.

In 2016, Soussan joined Last in Line, a band formed by former members of Dio, following the death of original bassist Jimmy Bain. He wrote, performed and contributed to the follow up II album as well as the third album Jericho.

In 2017, Soussan was inducted into the RockGodz Hall of Fame.

== Selected discography ==
=== With Ozzy Osbourne ===
- The Ultimate Sin (1986)

=== With Billy Idol ===
- Charmed Life (1990) (tracks 3, 10 & 11)

=== With Kings of the Sun ===
- Resurrection (1993)

=== With Beggars and Thieves ===
- Beggars & Thieves (1990)

=== With Johnny Hallyday ===
- Rough Town (1994)
- Live at La Cigale (1995)
- Lorada (1996)
- Lorada Tour Live (1996)
- Destination Vegas (1997)

=== With Steve Lukather ===
- Luke (1997)

=== With Last in Line ===
- II (2018)
- Jericho (2023)

=== Other recording and live appearances up to the present ===
- John Waite
- Richie Kotzen
- Edgar Winter
- Toto
- Jani Lane
- Solo dates – Vibrate, No Protection
- Big Noize (w/Sebastian Bach, George Lynch & Vinny Appice)
- Last in Line
- Diamond Kobra
- Kings of the Sun
