= If You Want It (Niteflyte song) =

1979 single by Niteflyte

Single by Niteflyte

from the album Niteflyte
- B-side: "I Wonder (If I'm Falling In Love Again)"
- Released: 1979
- Genre: R&B; funk; soul
- Length: 3:50 (single version); 4:30 (album & 12" version)
- Label: Ariola Records
- Songwriters: Howard Johnson; Sandy Torano
- Producers: Sandy Torano, Barry Mraz

Niteflyte singles chronology
| "If You Want It" (1979) | "All About Love" (1980) |

"If You Want It" is a song by Niteflyte. It was released in 1979 as a single from their debut self-titled album.

The song is the band's only Top 40 hit on the Billboard Hot 100 and Billboard's Hot Soul Singles charts, peaking at No. 37 and No. 21 respectively. In 2021, it was sampled by Flamingosis in his track "Cosmic Feeling".

== Chart performance ==
| Chart (1980) | Peak position |
|---|---|
| US Billboard Hot 100 | 37 |
| US Cashbox Top 100 | 59 |
| US Billboard Hot Soul Singles | 21 |
