= Big Noize =

American rock band (2006–2016)

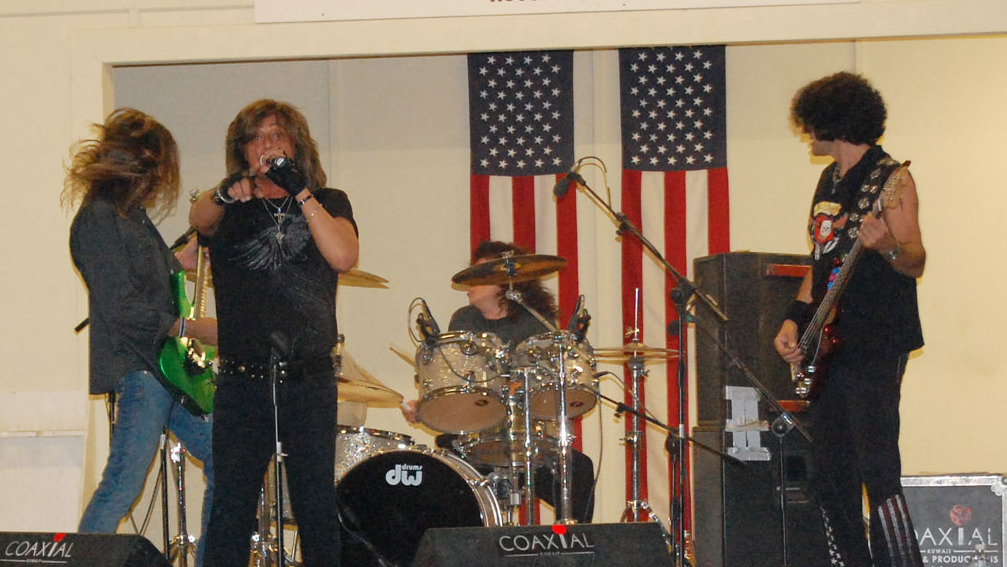
- Big Noize performing at Camp Taji in 2008

Background information
- Genres: Hard rock; heavy metal; glam metal
- Years active: 2006–2016
- Past members: Phil Soussan; Joe Lynn Turner; Carlos Cavazo; Vinny Appice; Gary Corbett; Teddy Andreadis; Simon Wright; Alex Bubenheim; Erik Norlander; Sebastian Bach; George Lynch; Bruce Kulick; Phil X; Craig Goldy

Big Noize, also written as Big Noise, were an American rock supergroup, including members of Deep Purple, Rainbow, Ozzy Osbourne, Dio, Black Sabbath, Quiet Riot, AC/DC, Skid Row, Dokken, Kiss and Bon Jovi. Bassist Phil Soussan was the band's only consistent member.

== History ==
Big Noize was formed in 2006 by singer Joe Lynn Turner (Rainbow, Deep Purple), guitarist Carlos Cavazo (Quiet Riot), drummer Vinny Appice (Dio, Black Sabbath), bassist Phil Soussan (Ozzy Osbourne, Billy Idol) and keyboardist Gary Corbett (Cinderella, Kiss). By 2008, Corbett was replaced by Teddy "Zig Zag" Andreadis (Guns 'N' Roses, Alice Cooper). The band's setlist mainly consisted of songs by band's that the members had been a part of.

The band did some shows at Camp Taji, Iraq for soldiers. For these shows, Appice was replaced by Simon Wright, who had replaced by in Dio and also played in AC/DC, keyboards were played by Alex Bubenheim. The band next played at Z Rock 2009 in Dudley, England, which Appice back as the band's drummer. They were inactive again until 2011, when Turner, Cavazo, Appice and Soussan were joined by keyboardist Erik Norlander.

Soussan and Appice unveiled a new line-up in 2013, featuring guitarist George Lynch (Dokken, Lynch Mob), and singer Sebastian Bach (Skid Row), Bach had previously performed with the band in 2012, when Turner was unavailable.

The band rebooted in 2014, again with Bach and Bruce Kulick on guitar, for a Mexican tour. The tour, however, was postponed due to an illness, and later cancelled. The band finally played a show in Moscow in 2016, with guitarist/vocalist Phil X (Bon Jovi), guitarist Craig Goldy (Dio, Giuffria), and returning keyboardist Teddy "Zig Zag" Andreadis.

== Members ==
- Phil Soussan – bass, backing vocals (2006–2016)
- Joe Lynn Turner – lead vocals (2006–2012)
- Carlos Cavazo – guitar (2006–2012)
- Vinny Appice – drums (2006–2008, 2009–2016)
- Gary Corbett – keyboards (2006–2007)
- Teddy "Zig Zag" Andreadis – keyboards, vocals (2008, 2016)
- Simon Wright – drums (2008)
- Alex Bubenheim – keyboards (2008)
- Erik Norlander – keyboards (2011)
- Sebastian Bach – lead vocals (2012, 2013)
- George Lynch – guitar (2013)
- Bruce Kulick – guitar (2014–2015)
- Phil X – lead vocals, guitar (2016)
- Craig Goldy – guitar (2016)
