= Supergroup (TV series) =

2006 American reality television show

- Starring: Scott Ian; Ted Nugent; Evan Seinfeld; Sebastian Bach; Jason Bonham; Doc McGhee
- Country of origin: United States
- No. of episodes: 7

Production
- Running time: 40 minutes

Original release
- Network: VH1
- Release: May 21 – July 2, 2006

Supergroup is an American reality television show which aired on VH1 in 2006. The show followed five well-known hard rock and heavy metal musicians over a 12-day period during which they lived together in a Las Vegas mansion owned by Nico Santucci in order to create, plan and perform a live show together. The show, which aired in seven segments, starred band members Sebastian Bach, Jason Bonham, Scott Ian, Ted Nugent and Evan Seinfeld. Doc McGhee, who had previously worked with Bach and his band Skid Row, appeared as the band's manager.

Journalist Lonn Friend and photographer Ross Halfin, who were long-time contributors for other VH1 features such as Behind the Music, appeared on the show.

== Band ==
The members of the band dubbed their band project Damnocracy, suggested by lead singer Sebastian Bach after hearing Scott Ian say "a god damn democracy, but we can't use 'god damn'" in response to their inability to come up with a band name everybody liked. Previously, the name Fist was also suggested by Sebastian Bach, saying that it means the five of them coming together, like fingers forming a fist. Eventually Sebastian and Ted agreed they had grown to dislike the name Fist.

Another name that was suggested was "Rawdog", then flipped around to "Godwar" by Evan Seinfeld, to which Bach replied that he did not want a band name that he "...had to think about". Ted Nugent suggested the name "Hunting Deer With a Bow and Arrow".

Yet another name that was suggested by Bach was "Savage Animal", but no one else liked the name. Bach liked it because it "rolled off the tongue" and because "rock and roll is a 'savage animal'." Savage Animal became one of the more popular names and became associated with the show, as many people laughed at its cliché title, despite Bach's ardent enthusiasm for the name. Bach's enthusiasm for the name Savage Animal became a popular subject of parody over the internet, with websites like YTMND and YouTube having made videos referencing that particular instance. The "Savage Animal" mania has gone as far as for Bach to be listed as a member of "Savage Animal" instead of "Damnocracy", intentionally or not, on some websites.

One initially proposed name was "Celebutard", a name suggested by Bach prior to "Savage Animal". This name was quickly laughed away.

The band's assumed manager was Doc McGhee, who has managed the likes of Kiss, Scorpions, Mötley Crüe, and Night Ranger. Doc had previously worked with Sebastian Bach in the rock band Skid Row.

The band did not release any albums and disbanded in 2010. Its members returned to their original bands or moved on to new projects.

== Band members ==
- Sebastian Bach – lead vocals
- Ted Nugent – lead guitar, backing vocals
- Scott Ian – rhythm guitar, backing vocals
- Evan Seinfeld – bass guitar, backing vocals
- Jason Bonham – drums, percussion

== Episodes ==
=== Original airing dates ===
1. Episode 1 – May 21
2. Episode 2 – May 28
3. Episode 3 – June 4
4. Episode 4 – June 11
5. Episode 5 – June 18
6. Episode 6 – June 25
7. Episode 7 – July 2

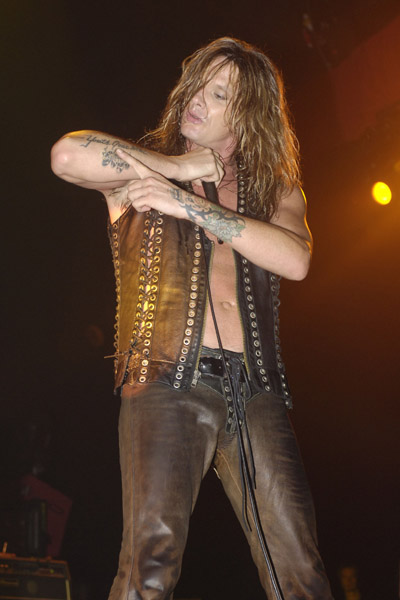
Sebastian Bach

=== Episode 1 ===
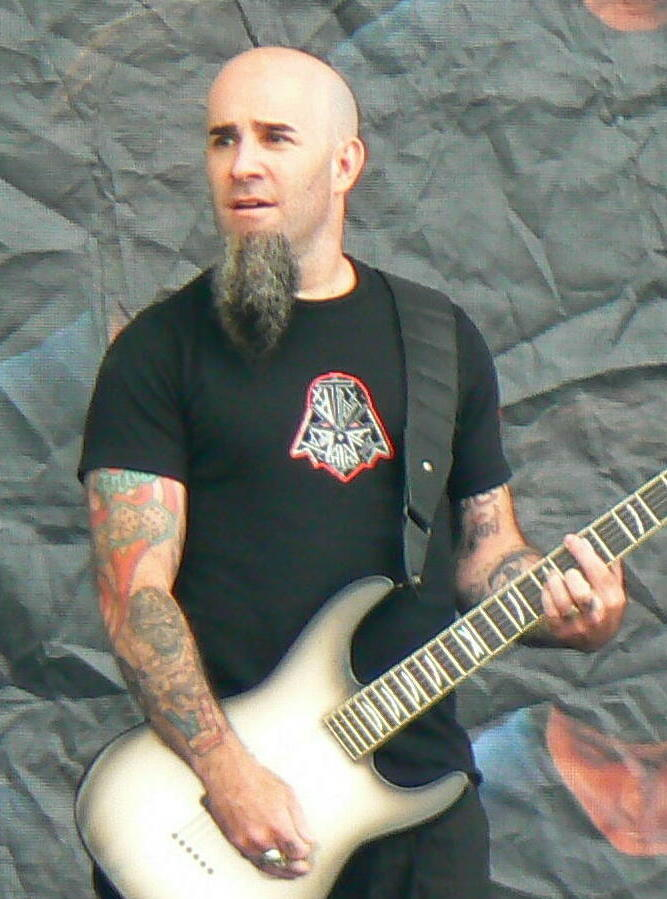
Scott Ian

The band members and Doc meet for the first time for the project. The band starts to explore their "creative space", a large mansion in Las Vegas. On the first rehearsals, they click musically, but are unable to come up with a name. They also meet Danushka Lysek, their chef for the upcoming two weeks, who immediately becomes a constant and easy target for tormenting, and a two-man PR team, whom they immediately disregard as business professionals. The first song also starts to take shape, but an unexpected problem occurs when the rehearsal space turns out to be less proficient for studio recording than expected.

=== Episode 2 ===
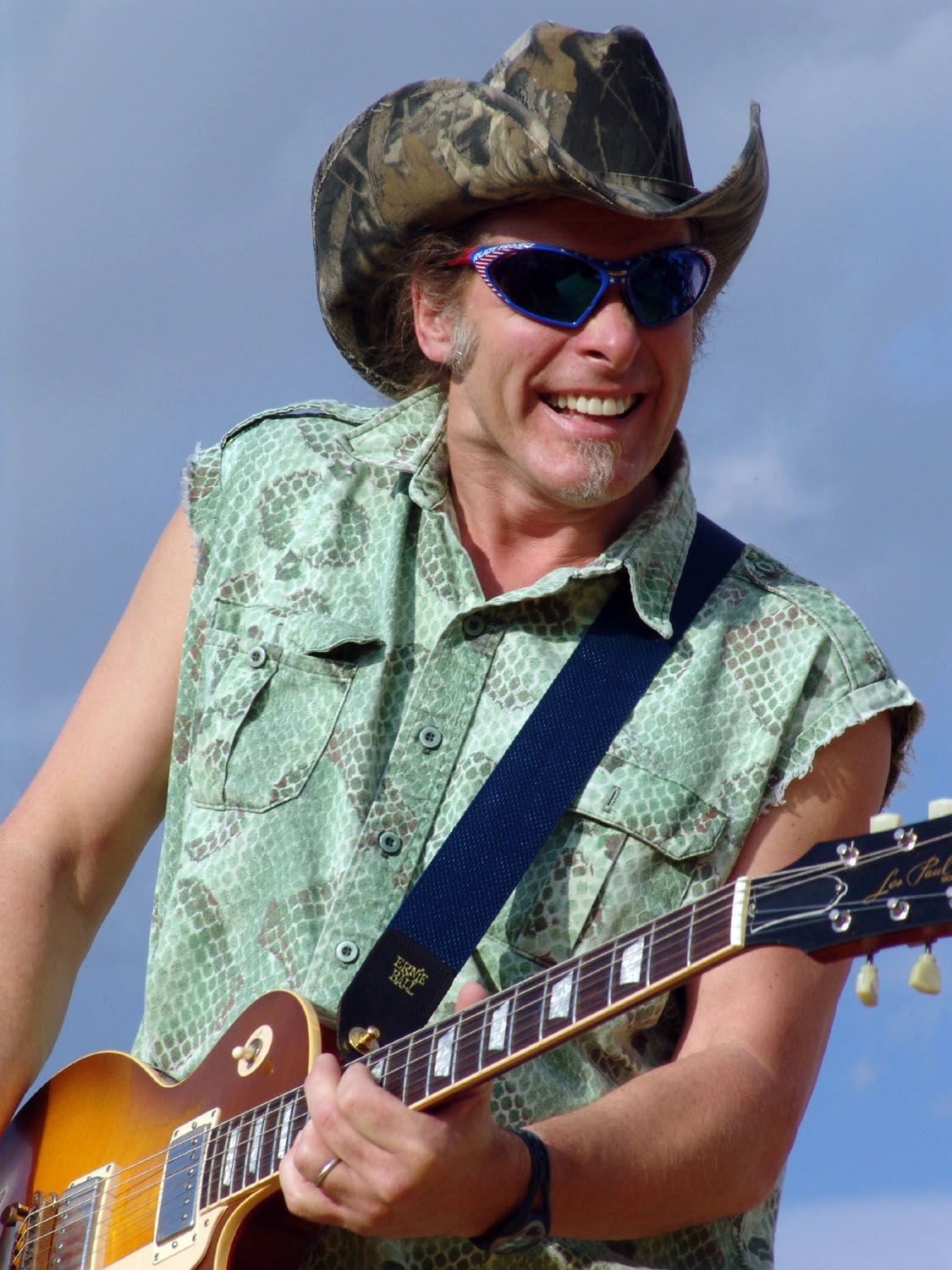
Ted Nugent

Jason Bonham has to leave because of two Foreigner shows he has to perform at, so the management gets Kid Beyond, a human beatboxer to fill in, as well as a fashion stylist to "update their image" — the band protests vehemently to both approaches (with Bach literally slamming the door in the beatboxer's face).

They do, however, manage to settle on a name, "Fist", which Sebastian explains by "five fingers coming together". Evan and Sebastian start to shape up the lyrics for their first co-written song, but while Evan insists on leaving for a dinner that he was hosting for the group, Sebastian stays and decides to work on the song, along with newly arrived recording engineer Kirk Moll, while Ted leaves to jam with Joe Bonamassa.

=== Episode 3 ===
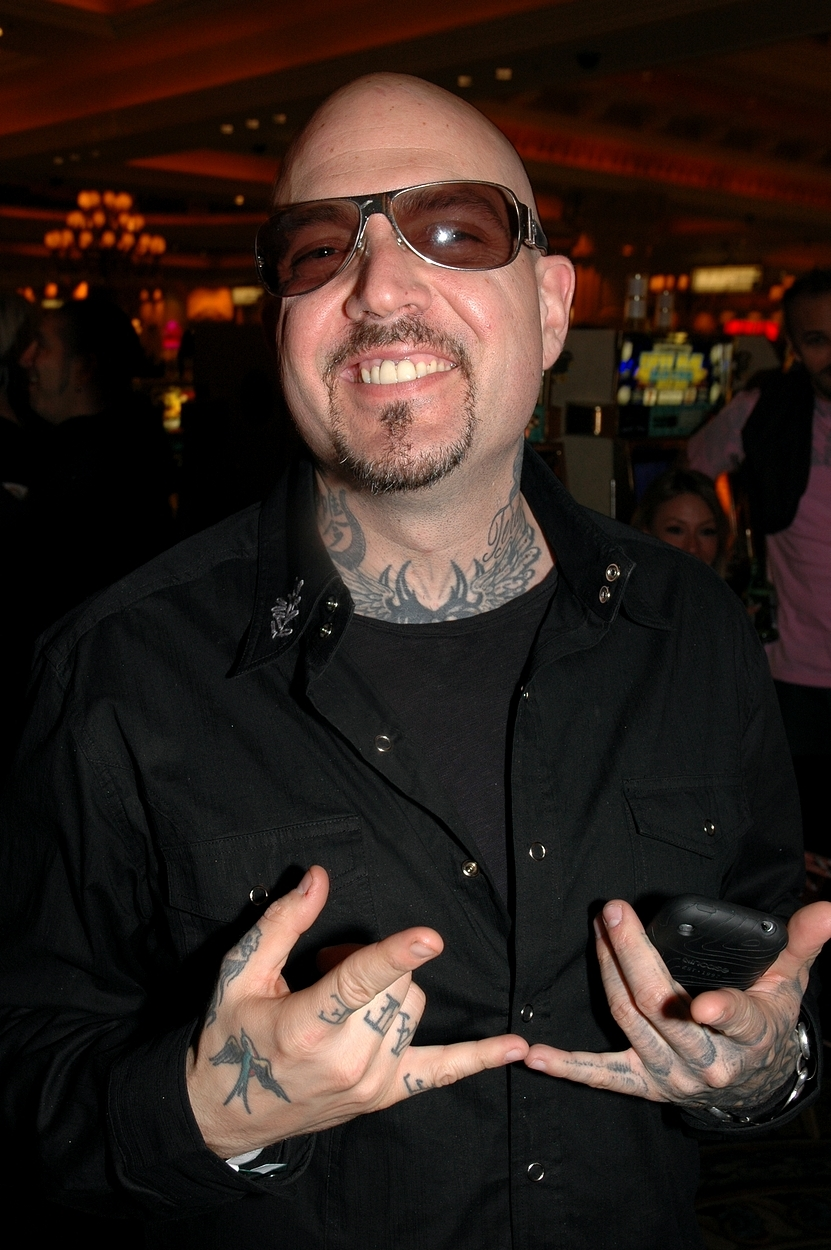
Evan Seinfeld

The band shows Doc their first song, but Doc is not impressed. Sebastian considers that it's because of an old rift between him and Doc. Evan decides to figure out what happened and talks to Doc, who explains his side of the story.

The band meets two graphic artists, who are to design the band logo. Valerie, the PR person, tells the band that Ross Halfin is coming from England to photograph them later that day. Sebastian insists on taking a jog and a makeover against the majority's will, seemingly upsetting the rest of the group, especially Jason.

During the wardrobe-check for the shoot, the group meets "Heatherette", a styling team, who presents the group a (perhaps deliberately) outrageous set of clothes. (Jason calmly remarks "I'm English", upon being presented a star-spangled jacket.) The group protests, except for Sebastian who picks out a jumpsuit, but is outvoted by the rest of the band, after pointing out that his choice is embarrassing to the rest of the band. At the photoshoot, Ross matches up Sebastian in verbal swashbuckling, much to the amusement of the rest of the band and the PR-team.

The next day, Evan explains his talk with Doc to Sebastian, who decides to settle things with Doc later. Sebastian also discovers the wine-cellar, and shows his discovery to Scott, who explains that the wine he's drinking is "two-buck Chuck", an extremely cheap brand. Sebastian pulls Doc aside at dinner and tries to talk to him, but neither of them shows any enthusiasm to settle things long-term.

Ted and Sebastian start to have second thoughts about the name "FIST". Sebastian has an interview scheduled, but he becomes hard to find and to convince after he decides to "be ready". During a rehearsal, Jason's thumb becomes numb and painful, so he visits a doctor and gets an X-ray, who advises a week of rest — something Jason obviously does not have time for. While Doc tries to enlist famed producer Rob Cavallo to help the band, Scott is visited by his wife (listed by VH1 as "fiancee") Pearl Aday. The band also disregards the idea of writing a ballad.

=== Episode 4 ===
Doc enlists Rob Cavallo to tell his opinion about their first song, "Take It Back". Cavallo voices his dislike of the song, telling the band that it's "dated" (which Ted considers an insult) and that the beat should be "more punk-like" (which insults Jason). The band, nevertheless, realizes that their views on the song are far too subjective, and sometimes they need a reality check.

Evan finally gets his revenge on Ted, and with the help of Scott, he wakes Ted up by putting his bass amp in front of Ted's door, cranking it up to the maximum and placing the bass nearby so it feeds back and resonates loudly. Ted acknowledges the effort, although he states that his door handle broke, so he could not display a white flag to surrender.

The band, much to the dismay of the management, decides to ditch the name "FIST", and starts wondering about another one. Evan and Scott come up with "Godwar", partly because it's "raw dog" spelled backwards. Sebastian (according to Jason, not entirely surprisingly) disregards the name, and insists on his choice, "Savage Animal", albeit at this radio interview, he only mentions that the band has a couple of ideas. During the final band meeting, Scott notes that things would work much better if it was not for the "damn democracy", which ignites Sebastian to come up with "Damnocracy". The band (and the management) finally agrees. Sebastian's wife Maria Bierk and Evan's wife Tera Patrick also arrive.

Sebastian also starts to show the repercussions of his wine consumption, at one point having a near-romantic talk to a quite puzzled Scott about how he would never change a guitar player. He also insists that the band should watch his performance on TV in the show Gilmore Girls — something no one really seems to enjoy besides him.

At dinner, Jason notes that Robert Plant and Jimmy Page recommended the band to do a cover of the Led Zeppelin song, "Out on the Tiles", because Zeppelin never performed it live. Since it is a song that was born after an idea by Jason's father, John Bonham (whose death also had its 25th anniversary in 2005), the band decides to pay tribute and rehearse the song, albeit all of them point out that playing a Led Zeppelin song recommended by Led Zeppelin comes with a large responsibility. The song's vocal range, however, seems to be a difficulty for Sebastian, who also insists on having constant eye-contact with Jason during songs, something that Jason does not quite understand.

Tera and Evan decide to do a photo shoot, only to later convince Maria to join in and make some photos together. Sebastian enjoys this immensely, but Ted says he is turned off by public displays of sex and leaves.

=== Episode 5 ===
The band discusses their next day warm-up performance, during which Sebastian and Jason debate their stage show, and while Sebastian insists that the drummer look him in the eye, Jason simply prefers to play his own thing and others to follow.

Ted takes Scott and Evan to a shooting range, where they fire various heavy weaponry. Jason stays home, because he does not like the idea, while Sebastian stays to take a rest. Ted's wife Shemane also arrives, and voices concern about her attitude not being a "rock-star wife" and not fitting in with the other wives, and the band's constant swearing.

Chris, a graphic artist, brings a promotional painting of the superheroic likenesses of the band that he was working on, which amazes the group, save Scott, who's a bit sad about his character looking like "mashed potato". Jason suggests to auction the picture for charity.

Sebastian eventually reaches a low point in inebriation, and starts to ramble during a rehearsal and recording session of a ballad they recently wrote. He insists on Evan to noogie him, and when that happens, the two jokingly start to wrestle on the floor. As soon as Scott can be heard "Here we go..." (and later noting that "I just looked at Jason and said, 'This is gonna get serious in about ten seconds'", possibly referring to experiences he previously talked about in Behind the Music when Anthrax's Charlie Benante and Frank Bello would fight the same way in the studio), Sebastian turns Evan over and pushes him on the floor, not realizing that Evan hits his head on a nearby amp. Evan becomes furious, pushes Sebastian away and tries to punch him. While Sebastian insists that he's just playing, Evan storms out from the room. Scott and Jason try to mediate, but Sebastian also storms out.

The next day, while Jason updates Ted with the news, Evan is still furious about Sebastian being out of control. Sebastian goes to him to apologize, attributing his out of control behavior to the wine. They end up settling things, but Evan clearly states that Sebastian has to cut down on his drinking.

The band gets ready for the performance, although Scott and Jason are worried about playing to "five tourists and ten people holding up Skid Row album covers". The gig eventually turns out to be quite popular, as the band plays "Sin City" (AC/DC) and "Cat Scratch Fever". The group is satisfied, although Doc points out that the songs were not as tight as they could have been, something which the band decides to work on.

The band decides to celebrate at a sushi restaurant, joined by Nikki Benz and Lexie Marie, models for TeraVision, invited by Tera. Evan is shocked to notice that Sebastian is drinking again.

=== Episode 6 ===
Ted goes to a radio promo show as a guest DJ, but flips out when the host decides to play Puddle of Mudd instead of Ted's music during the interview.

Evan, meanwhile, is still distraught about Sebastian drinking the night before, and starts to complain to other members, to which Doc responds with "you've been here 12 days... try 12 years" and they all conclude that Sebastian needs serious help.

T.L., the stylist shows up again with a set of clothes to try, with little luck on Evan, Scott or Ted, but is able to convince Jason to wear a cowboy hat, while Sebastian insists on a leather jacket which is visibly too small on him.

The band expands their playlist with Biohazard's song "Punishment", but Evan is concerned about Ted learning the song. Upon trying to show Ted the riffs, Evan ends up expressing his sadness about Sebastian's drinking problem, and tells Ted that if there's anyone who can convince him to stop, it's probably Ted, since Sebastian feels a paternal bond with him. Ted takes up the task, and has a tough talk with Sebastian, explicitly forbidding him any alcoholic drink. Sebastian is shocked, but promises to comply, and eventually adopts Ted as his "dad".

The group goes to a guitar store for a promotional signing, only to see that they can in fact have rabid fans at their show, some of them being lifetime fans of their respective bands. Back at home, upon practicing "Punishment", Jason admits that he's not familiar with the song, but promises to learn it as soon as he can.

At dinner, Ted and Shemane invite the whole band to their farm, something which the band is a little surprised but extremely happy about. Sebastian points out in front of everyone that he's not drinking, and insists on not ever doing so, in fright of Ted's repercussions.

Jason proceeds to learn "Punishment", and although first a bit alienated, he ends up admiring the song for bringing new elements to his style of drumming. Sebastian goes running in the nearby mountains, and enjoys the first day of his complete sobriety. Ted also learns the song, and he points out that while it's not his kind of music, he insists on playing it with full attitude, to the great satisfaction of Evan.

Doc takes the band to the Fremont Street Experience, for reasons unknown to them. When they arrive, they are shown a cartoon animation of the group represented as a superhuman rock group, destroying various "bubblegum pop" icons and joining forces upon seeing a searchlight with the Damnocracy logo (akin to the Bat-Signal). The band, for the first time in the show, genuinely agrees on the quality and effect of the animation. Evan and Sebastian stay in downtown Vegas to spend a romantic night with their respective wives.

=== Episode 7 ===
It's the day of the concert, and everyone starts to show signs of nerve and excitement. To calm down the other members, Ted arranges a barbecue to raise their spirits; at the barbecue, all band members express how much they enjoy the current project and agree to treat the project as an actual band instead of a one-off performance.

Upon asked about the band's future, Sebastian expresses concern about the business side of Damnocracy, as it is unknown who owns the rights to the band's name. This eventually turns out to be in reaction to a prior problem, where during his time in Skid Row, it turned out that Sebastian did not own any legal rights to the band name "Skid Row". While Doc does not understand the reason for this (as Sebastian was only the second singer of Skid Row), Sebastian and Doc talk through the issue and clear up matters.

Evan, however, suddenly packs up and storms out from the house with Tera without giving any reason to anyone, leaving the entire band and management alike in confusion. The band, however, has to leave immediately to do a soundcheck. The group meets the first members of their future audience, and proceeds to go to the soundcheck, to be joined by Evan 45 minutes later. The soundcheck brings out some classic technical problems such as wrong monitoring and broken or malfunctioning equipment, infuriating Scott for the first time during the show. After problems are resolved, the band prepares for the show backstage, being extremely excited about the performance.

The concert starts with the Motörhead classic "Ace of Spades", and the band enjoys complete comfort on stage as they head into AC/DC's "T.N.T.", Skid Row's "Youth Gone Wild", and Anthrax's "Only". They also perform "Punishment", the song they feared so much, but in retrospect, all of them confess that it was probably the tightest song during the whole set.

The group dedicates "Out on the Tiles" to the late John Bonham, and while Sebastian audibly has a tough time with the song, Jason performs a spectacular roll-off at the end. "Stranglehold" delivers a bit of a tension, when Sebastian continues to throw Damnocracy T-shirts in the crowd during Ted's guitar solo, but the band nevertheless continues with their own song, "Take It Back", the song previously labeled "dated", which, regardless, receives a large ovation.

During "Sin City", however, Sebastian shocks the band by pulling out a bottle of Jack Daniel's and guzzling part of it down on crowd request. A suspicious Ted takes part of the drink, and lights up to realize that it's in fact simple tea. The band closes the show with Cat Scratch Fever.

In retrospect, all band members express their joy with the project, and hope to work again on either an album or a tour. And at the end of the final seventh episode, viewers were left with a text message saying that Damnocracy had continued to rehearse and make new music after shooting wrapped. However, at the end of the text, the band was still willing to continue with even more rehearsing and making new music but they could not pull Ted Nugent away from going hunting.

== Premiere concert setlist ==
Performed at The Empire Ballroom on March 5, 2006:

1. "Ace of Spades" (Motörhead)
2. "Free for All" (Ted Nugent)
3. "T.N.T." (AC/DC)
4. "Out on the Tiles" (Led Zeppelin)
5. "Only" (Anthrax)
6. "Take It Back" (Damnocracy)
7. "Punishment" (Biohazard)
8. "Stranglehold" (Ted Nugent)
9. "Sin City" (AC/DC)
10. "Youth Gone Wild" (Skid Row)
11. "Cat Scratch Fever" (Ted Nugent)
12. "Whole Lotta Love" (Led Zeppelin)

(Note: This is a reported song order - the show might have presented the concert in an edited order.)

== Supergroup II ==
VH1 greenlit a second season of Supergroup which would have had an all female ensemble. Ann Wilson of Heart, Charlotte Caffey of The Go-Go's, and drummer Stefanie Eulinberg of Kid Rock fame were slated to take part. Financial and scheduling difficulties put a halt on the project and it never happened.
