= Nick Sterling =

American guitarist

Nicholas Sterling
- Born: Nicholas James Sterling; June 18, 1990; Mesa, Arizona, U.S.
- Genres: Rock, hard rock
- Occupation: Guitarist
- Spouse: Cyreena

Nicholas James Sterling (born June 18, 1990) is an American guitarist from Mesa, Arizona. He has played with rock musicians and bands such as Aerosmith, Kid Rock, Cheap Trick, Cinderella, Steve Vai, Joe Satriani, Eric Johnson, Gary Hoey, Peter Frampton, Gavin Degraw, Bachman–Turner Overdrive, Jackyl, Sebastian Bach, and Guns N' Roses.

== Biography ==
Sterling started learning guitar at the age of seven. By age 10, he had released his first CD, Ten. The same year, he shared a stage with Alice Cooper at a New Year's Eve concert. When he was 13, guitarist Dave Mason expressed admiration for his talent. In 2005, Sterling released his second CD, Life Goes On. Sterling played all the instruments, did the vocals and recorded both CDs himself. His third album Invisible was released in 2010.

Since 2008, Sterling has been a columnist for Modern Guitars Magazine.

In October 2009, Sebastian Bach announced that after a long search he had chosen Sterling to be his new guitar player. Sterling joined Bach on stage for the first time in Helsinki in December 2009 when they opened for Alice Cooper. In August 2012, Sterling was fired from Bach's band after refusing to sign a release to perform with Bach on AXS TV.

Sterling is currently the lead guitarist in the Phoenix-based band WYVES. He has a daughter with his fiancé Cyreena.

== Discography ==
=== Solo ===
1. Ten (2000) (Desert Dog)
2. Life Goes On... (2005) (Desert Dog)
3. Invisible (2010) (Desert Dog)

=== Sebastian Bach ===
1. Kicking & Screaming (2011) (Frontier Records)
