= Give 'Em Hell (Sebastian Bach album) =

Studio album by Sebastian Bach
- Released: March 26, 2014
- Recorded: April 30, 2013 – January 13, 2014
- Genre: Heavy metal, hard rock
- Length: 49:01
- Label: Frontiers; Get off My Bach! Avalon
- Producer: Bob Marlette

Sebastian Bach chronology
Kicking & Screaming (2011)	Give 'Em Hell (2014)	Child Within the Man (2024)

Singles from Give 'Em Hell
- 1. "Temptation" Released: 2014

Give 'Em Hell is the fifth studio album by heavy metal singer Sebastian Bach, and the third to include all original studio recordings. The album was released in Japan on March 26, 2014, in Europe on April 18, and in North America on April 22 by Frontiers Records. The album's lead single "Temptation", premiered on Jay Mohr's Stories podcast on February 17, 2014. Music videos were made for the single "Temptation", "Taking Back Tomorrow" and "All My Friends Are Dead".

Professional ratings
Review scores
Source	Rating
AllMusic	4.0/5 stars
Artistdirect	4.0/5 stars
Jukebox:Metal	4/5 stars

== Track listing ==
No.	Title	Writer(s)	Length
1.	"Hell Inside My Head"	Sebastian Bach, KS Anthony, Bob Marlette, Jeff George	3:57
2.	"Harmony"	Bach, Devin Bronson, Duff McKagan, Marlette	3:48
3.	"All My Friends Are Dead"	Bach, Bronson, Marlette, Isaac Carpenter	4:38
4.	"Temptation"	Bach, John 5, Johnny Chromatic, Marlette	3:46
5.	"Push Away"	Bach, Steve Stevens	5:20
6.	"Dominator"	Bach, Bronson, Marlette	4:32
7.	"Had Enough"	Bach, Bronson, Stevens, Marlette, KS Anthony	4:35
8.	"Gun to a Knife Fight"	Bach, Stevens, Marlette, KS Anthony	4:04
9.	"Rock N Roll Is a Vicious Game" (April Wine cover)	Myles Goodwyn	4:01
10.	"Taking Back Tomorrow"	Bach, Bronson, Carpenter, Marlette	4:01
11.	"Disengaged"	Bach, Bronson, Marlette, KS Anthony	3:13
12.	"Forget You"	Bach, Bronson, Marlette	3:06

Japanese edition
No.	Title	Writer(s)	Length
13.	"Rock N Roll Is a Vicious Game" (Acoustic)	Myles Goodwyn	4:00

== Personnel ==
- Sebastian Bach – lead vocals
- Duff McKagan – bass guitar
- Devin Bronson – guitar
- Bobby Jarzombek – drums and percussion

Guest musician

- John 5 – guitar (4)
- Steve Stevens – guitar (5, 7, 8)

Production

- Bob Marlette – producer
- Tom Baker – mastering
- Richard Villa – cover art

== Commercial performance ==
The album debuted at No. 72 on the Billboard 200 and at No. 3 in the Hard Rock Albums chart with 4,000 copies sold in its debut week in the U.S.

== Charts ==
Chart (2014)	Peak position
UK Rock & Metal Albums (OCC)	17
UK Independent Albums (OCC)	47
US Billboard 200	72
US Top Rock Albums (Billboard)	18
US Top Hard Rock Albums (Billboard)	3
