= Sell/Buy/Date =

- Official poster
- Directed by: Sarah Jones
- Screenplay by: Sarah Jones
- Story by: Sarah Jones; David Goldblum
- Produced by: Sarah Jones; David Goldblum; Julie Parker Benello
- Cinematography: Joshua Z. Weinstein
- Edited by: Melissa McCoy
- Music by: Jeff Beal
- Production companies: Foment Productions; Conscious Contact Entertainment; Secret Sauce Media; Artemis Rising Foundation; JustFilms/Ford Foundation; InMaat Foundation; Meadow Fund
- Distributed by: Cinedigm
- Release dates: March 11, 2022 (SXSW); October 14, 2022 (United States)
- Running time: 97 minutes
- Country: United States
- Language: English

Sell/Buy/Date is a 2022 American documentary-comedy-drama film directed, written, and produced by Sarah Jones, from a story by Jones and David Goldblum, based upon her off-Broadway play of the same name. Meryl Streep serves as an executive producer.

It had its world premiere at South by Southwest on March 11, 2022. It was released on October 14, 2022, by Cinedigm.

== Plot ==
The film follows Sarah Jones as she travels across the United States, navigating the sex industry's relationship with race, power, and economics. Jones additionally portrays four different characters, with Rosario Dawson, Bryan Cranston, Ilana Glazer, Evan Seinfeld, Lotus Lain, Terria Xo, Leslie Farrington, Alice Little, among others appearing in the film.

== Production ==
In January 2021, it was announced Sarah Jones would direct, write, and produce, a documentary revolving around the sex industry, based on her Off-Broadway play of the same name, with Meryl Streep, Laverne Cox and Rashida Jones serving as executive producers. The announcement of the project drew significant backlash, from sex workers and rights activists. Cox and Jones later exited the project. Following the backlash, Jones throughout the film made sure to include sex workers of various backgrounds.

== Release ==
The film had its world premiere at South by Southwest on March 11, 2022. In July 2022, Cinedigm acquired distribution rights to the film. It was released on October 14, 2022.

== Reception ==
On the review aggregator website Rotten Tomatoes, the film has an approval rating of 71% based on 14 reviews, with an average rating of 7.2/10.
