= Kicking & Screaming (Sebastian Bach album) =

Studio album by Sebastian Bach
- Released: September 21, 2011 (Japan)
- Recorded: February–May 2011
- Studio: Precision Mastering Studio (Los Angeles)
- Genre: Heavy metal, hard rock
- Length: 51:18
- Label: Frontiers; Get Off My Bach! Avalon
- Producer: Bob Marlette

Sebastian Bach chronology
Angel Down (2007)	Kicking & Screaming (2011)	Give 'Em Hell (2014)

Singles from Kicking & Screaming
- 1. "Kicking and Screaming" Released: 2011; 2. "My Own Worst Enemy" Released: 2011; 3. "I'm Alive" Released: 2011

Kicking & Screaming is the overall fourth release by heavy metal singer Sebastian Bach, and the second to include all original studio recordings. The album was released on September 21, 2011, in Japan, September 23, 2011, in Europe and Australia and September 27, 2011, in North America. The original album cover art was made by Richard Villa.

== Release and promotion ==
The album titled track "Kicking & Screaming" was released as the lead single in the US, UK and Australia. The music video premiered on the Revolver website on August 3, 2011. The track "My Own Worst Enemy" was also released as a single in Japan. Further videos were made for the promo single "I'm Alive" and "Tunnelvision".

The album debuted on the Billboard Top 200 album chart at No. 73.

The 2008 single "Battle with the Bottle", which Bach sang on the finale of the reality TV show "Gone Country season 2", is included as a bonus track on the album. The music video is also included on the deluxe DVD edition.

== Reception ==
The album was received positively. Dave Steed of Popdose.com said, "Kicking & Screaming is unexpectedly fantastic and the Sebastian Bach record that I've been wishing for, for more than a decade now."

Professional ratings
Review scores
Source	Rating
About.com	4/5 stars
AllMusic	3.5/5 stars
Artistdirect	3.5/5 stars
The Metal Critic	7.5/10 stars
Music Review	(75/100)

== Track listing ==
Standard edition
No.	Title	Writer(s)	Length
1.	"Kicking and Screaming"	Sebastian Bach, Nick Sterling, Bob Marlette	3:17
2.	"My Own Worst Enemy"	Sterling	3:44
3.	"TunnelVision"	Bach, John 5, Marlette	3:49
4.	"Dance on Your Grave"	Bach, Sterling, Marlette	3:28
5.	"Caught in a Dream"	Sterling	3:39
6.	"As Long as I Got the Music"	Deanna Johnston, Sterling	3:37
7.	"I'm Alive"	Sterling	4:21
8.	"Dirty Power"	Bach, Sterling, Marlette	3:05
9.	"Live the Life"	Sterling, Marlette, Bach	3:50
10.	"Dream Forever"	Sterling, Ken Davis	4:14
11.	"One Good Reason"	Bach, Sterling	4:41
12.	"Lost in the Light"	Bach, Sterling	4:28
13.	"Wishin'"	Sterling, John Godwin	4:57

Deluxe edition
No.	Title	Writer(s)	Length
14.	"Jumpin' Off the Wagon"	Bach, Vicky McGehee, Jeffrey Steele	3:28

iTunes exclusive edition
No.	Title	Writer(s)	Length
14.	"Ain't There Yet"	Bach	3:32
15.	"Kicking and Screaming" (music video)	Bach, Sterling, Marlette	3:17

Japanese edition
No.	Title	Writer(s)	Length
14.	"Battle with the Bottle"	Bach	3:47

== DVD (deluxe edition only) ==
As Long as I Got the Music: The Making of Kicking and Screaming is a bonus DVD included on the deluxe edition of the album. It features behind-the-scenes footage of the recording of the album, live footage from Bach's tours opening for Guns N' Roses, and three music videos from "Kicking & Screaming" including the title track, "Tunnelvision", and "I'm Alive". Also included is the music video for the single "Battle with the Bottle" and video shoots between tracks.

DVD track listing
No.	Title	Length
1.	"Live from Bogota: American Metalhead"
2.	"Live from Santiago: (Love Is) a Bitchslap"
3.	"Live from Santiago: Stuck Inside"
4.	"Live from Halifax: Live the Life"
5.	"Live from Bogota: By Your Side"
6.	"Live from Santiago: TunnelVision"
7.	"Live from Bogota: Stabbin' Daggers"
8.	"Live from Santiago: You Don't Understand"
9.	"Kicking and Screaming" (music video)
10.	"Tunnelvision" (music video)
11.	"I'm Alive" (music video)
12.	"Live from London: Stuck Inside"
13.	"Live from Santiago: American Metalhead"
14.	"Battle with the Bottle" (hidden music video)

== Personnel ==
Band

- Sebastian Bach – vocals
- Bobby Jarzombek – drums, percussion
- Nick Sterling – bass, guitar

Guest musicians

- John 5 – guitar (track 3)

Other personnel

- Tom Baker – mastering
- Kyle Hoffmann – assistant engineer
- Richard Mace – layout design
- Bob Marlette – engineer, mixing, producer
- Chris Marlette – digital editing
- Clay Patrick McBride – photography
- Jon Gordon McKenzie – cover photo
- Richard Villa III – cover art, logo

== Chart positions ==
Chart	Position
UK Rock & Metal Albums (OCC)	30
US Billboard 200	73
US Top Rock Albums (Billboard)	15
US Top Hard Rock Albums (Billboard)	6
US Independent Albums (Billboard)	10
BBC Top 40 Rock Albums	40
