= Los Angeles Kiss =

Arena football team

Logo

General information
- Founded: 2013
- Folded: 2016
- Headquartered: Honda Center in Anaheim, California
- Colors: Black, flame, gold, chrome, white

Personnel
- Owners: Gene Simmons; Paul Stanley; Doc McGhee
- Head coach: Omarr Smith
- President: Joe Windham

Team history
- Los Angeles Kiss (2014–2016)

Home fields
- Honda Center (2014–2016); Valley View Casino Center (San Diego, 2016 Playoffs)

League / conference affiliations
- Arena Football League (2014–2016): National Conference (2014–2016); West Division (2014–2015)

Playoff appearances (1)
- 2016

The Los Angeles Kiss (stylized as LA KISS) were a professional arena football team based in Anaheim, California, and members of the Arena Football League (AFL). The Kiss joined the AFL as an expansion team after Los Angeles' previous franchise (Los Angeles Avengers) did not return as a part of Arena Football 1. The team's ownership was a group of Gene Simmons and Paul Stanley, members of rock band Kiss, as well as their manager Doc McGhee. The team played its home games at the Honda Center in nearby Anaheim, which they shared with the Anaheim Ducks of the National Hockey League. The team was featured in the AMC series 4th and Loud.

== History ==
=== Southern California's prior AFL history ===
The Kiss was the third AFL team to represent Los Angeles, the fourth to represent Southern California, and the second to play at the Honda Center. Los Angeles' first AFL team was the Los Angeles Cobras, which called the Los Angeles Memorial Sports Arena home for the team's only season of 1988, in which they finished 5–6–1, making the playoffs but losing to the Chicago Bruisers in the first round. Eight years later, the Anaheim Piranhas moved from Las Vegas, beginning play for the 1996 season at the Honda Center (known as the Arrowhead Pond at the time). Their first season saw them finish 9–5 and make the playoffs (losing to the Tampa Bay Storm in the first round), but their second season saw them finish 2–12 and fold after year's end, most likely because of their owner, C. David Baker, being named the AFL's commissioner and wanting to focus on that.

Los Angeles' longest-running foray in arena football was the Los Angeles Avengers, which called the Staples Center home during their nine-year run from 2000 until the league's suspension of operations in 2008. During that time, the team made five playoff appearances and won one division title (in 2005), though only winning one of those playoff games.

=== Kiss arrives ===
On August 15, 2013, it was announced that Kiss (who performed the night before ArenaBowl XXVI) had purchased a share of an AFL expansion team set to begin play in 2014. Kiss lead members Gene Simmons and Paul Stanley, their manager Doc McGhee, and league veteran Brett Bouchy jointly own the team.

On September 10, 2013, Kiss began assembling their first roster, trading their first pick in the dispersal draft of Chicago Rush and Utah Blaze players, to the Iowa Barnstormers in exchange for quarterback J. J. Raterink. With their second and third picks, they drafted wide receiver Chase Deadder and linebacker Antwan Marsh. On September 17, 2013, they named Bob McMillen, the 2013 AFL Coach of the Year, the franchise's first head coach. On September 18, the Kiss hired former Los Angeles Dodgers business executive Schuyler Hoversten as its inaugural president.

The games were themed to echo a Kiss music concert: games opened with an electric guitar rendition of The Star-Spangled Banner; there was "loud pyrotechnics and music" throughout the game; "the Kiss logo is plastered everywhere: on the arena football field, on the end zone and on the flame-emblazoned jerseys in the stands. ... [There is a] Kiss Girls dance-squad in black leather." The team's artificial turf field was also colored in a unique silver color scheme.

On Tuesday, August 12, 2014, AMC premiered 4th and Loud, a reality documentary series focusing on the team's inaugural season.

On October 30, 2015, Bob McMillen stepped down as head coach and general manager of the Kiss. Shortly thereafter, the Kiss hired former Arizona Rattlers team president Joe Windham as their president and also hired former San Jose SaberCats player and assistant coach Omarr Smith as their second head coach in team history.

=== Playoff debut ===
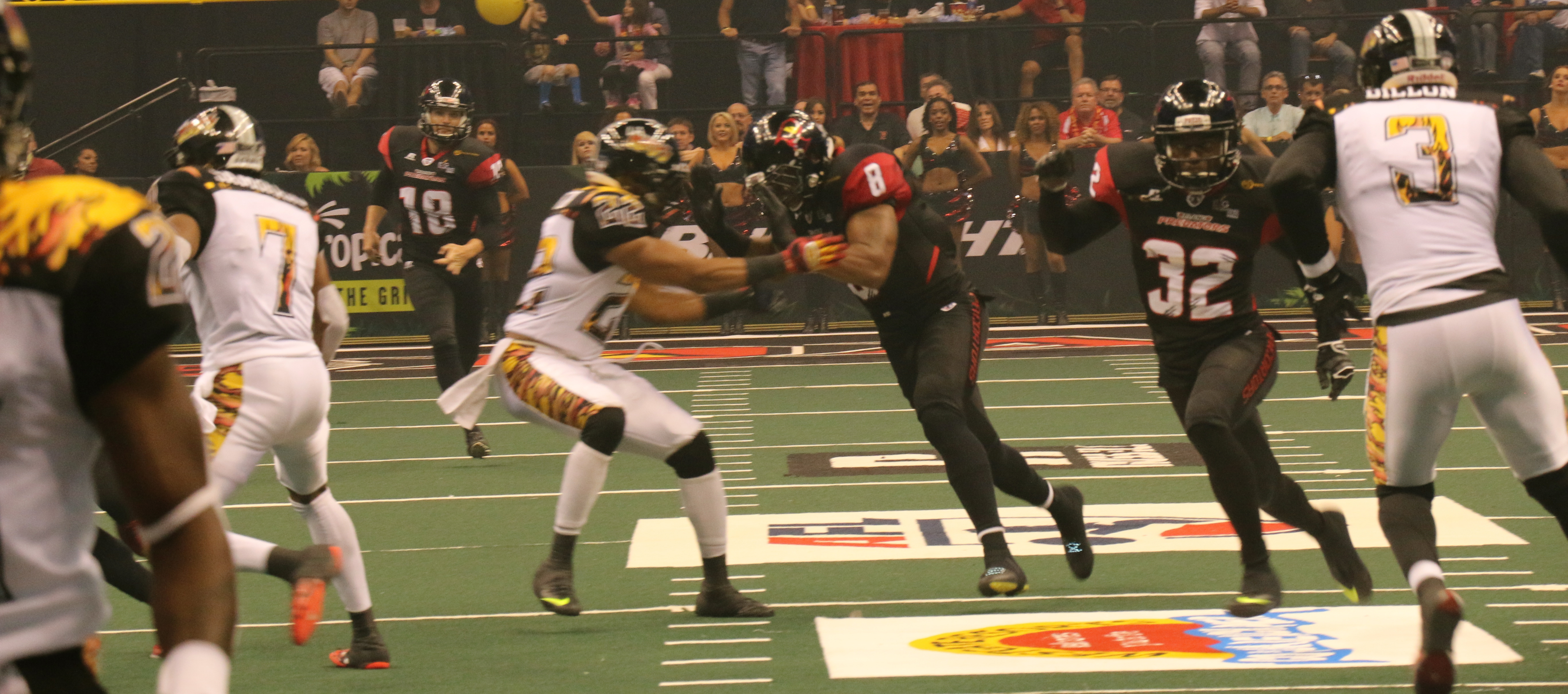
The Kiss playing the Orlando Predators in 2015

The Kiss made their inaugural playoff appearance on August 7, 2016, facing the Cleveland Gladiators in the first round of the AFL playoffs. The game was played at the Valley View Casino Center in San Diego, California, as their home arena, the Honda Center, played host to the Ringling Brothers and Barnum and Bailey Circus and a WWE RAW broadcast that weekend. The Kiss lost to the Gladiators 56–52 in front of 4,692 fans in San Diego. Shortly after the game, team captain Donavan Morgan announced his retirement.

The Kiss ceased answering their phones during the 2016 offseason and its roster was liquidated that October. In a long-form piece released in Sports Illustrated in April 2017, it was revealed that the band had pulled its support from the team shortly after the end of the season, privately stating they had done all they could to keep the franchise alive. Minority owners attempted to find new investors to keep the franchise afloat but were unsuccessful.

The Kiss represented the last team to attempt to fill a void in professional football that had existed for 21 years since the Los Angeles Rams left for St. Louis in 1995; the Kiss's folding coincided with the Rams' return to southern California.

== Media ==
All games were televised on ESPN, ESPN2, ESPN3, and the CBS Sports Network.

== Notable players ==
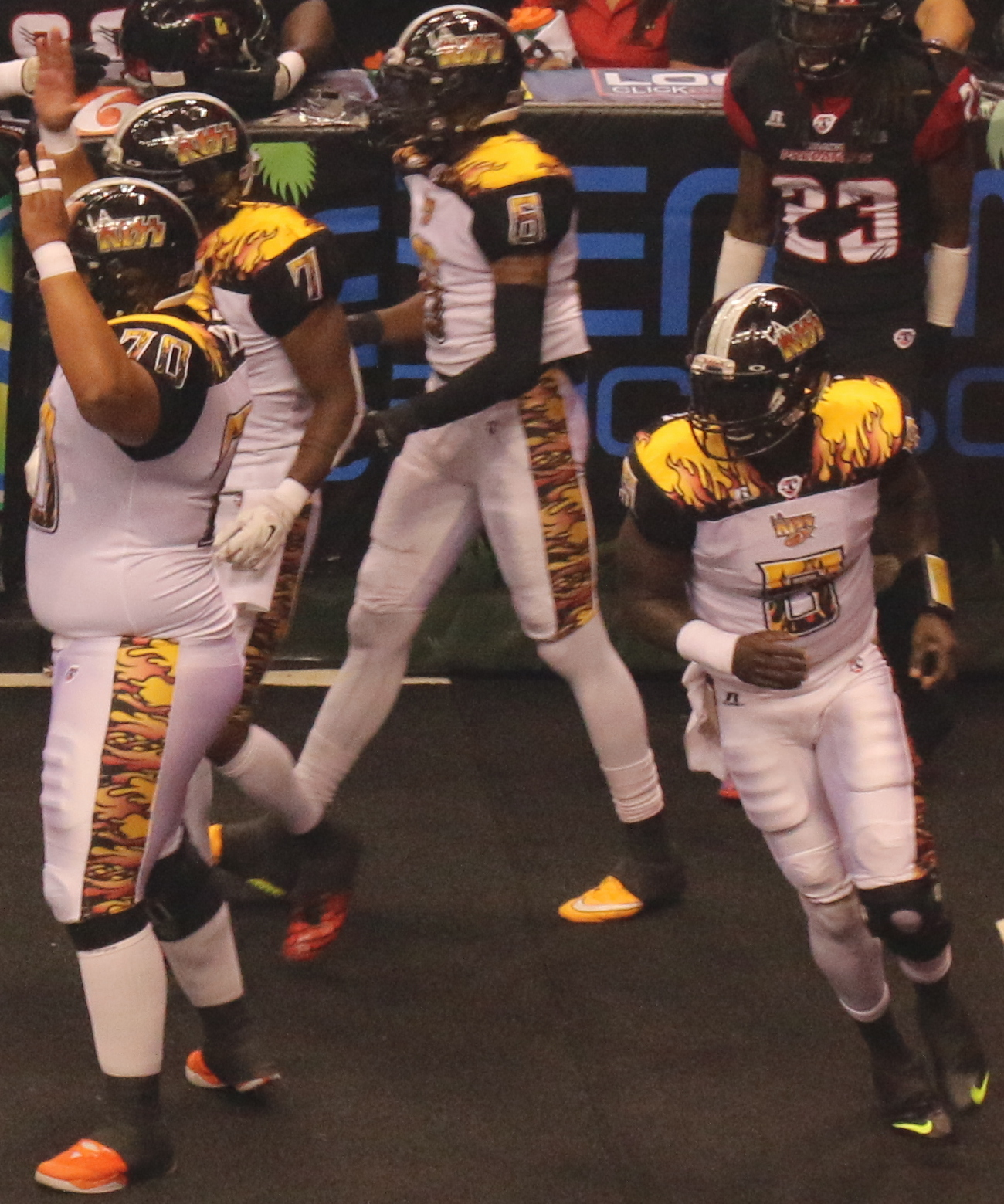
The Kiss in 2015

=== All-Arena players ===
The following players were named to All-Arena Teams while a member of the Kiss:

- WR Donovan Morgan (3)
- LB Beau Bell
- DB Rayshaun Kizer, Fredrick Obi

== Head coaches ==
Name	Term	Regular season				Playoffs		Awards
Name	Term	W	L	T	Win%	W	L	Awards
Bob McMillen	2014–2015	7	29	0	.194	0	0	
Omarr Smith	2016	7	9	0	.438	0	1	

== Season-by-season ==
ArenaBowl champions	ArenaBowl appearance	Division champions	Playoff berth

Season	Team	League	Conference	Division	Regular season			Postseason results
Season	Team	League	Conference	Division	Finish	Wins	Losses	Postseason results
Los Angeles Kiss
2014	2014	AFL	National	West	3rd	3	15	
2015	2015	AFL	National	West	3rd	4	14	
2016	2016	AFL	National	—	2nd	7	9	Lost Conference Semifinals (Cleveland) 52–56
Total						14	38	(includes only regular season)
Total						0	1	(includes only the postseason)
Total						14	39	(includes both regular season and postseason)
