= Devin Bronson =

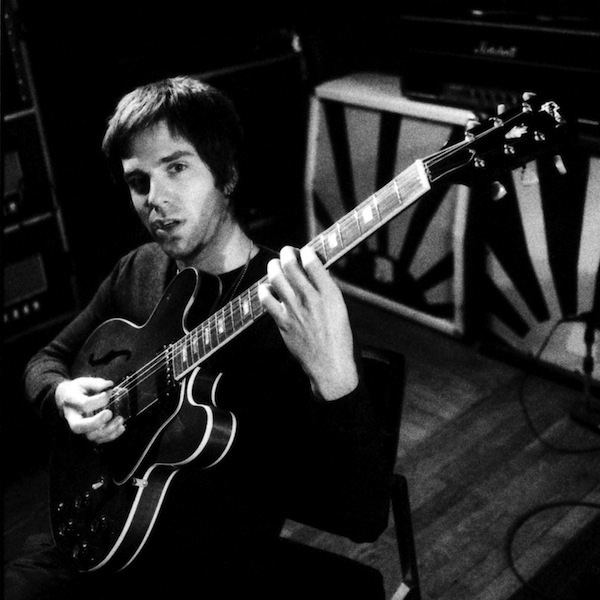

Background information
- Also known as: Evil D, D-rOck
- Born: Devin Joseph Bronson; May 15, 1983 (age 43)
- Origin: Seattle, Washington, United States
- Genres: Alternative rock, indie rock, pop punk, pop rock, power pop, acoustic
- Occupations: Musician, songwriter, guitarist
- Instruments: Vocals, guitar
- Years active: 2003–present
- Labels: Nettwerk, ViK, RCA
- Website: devinbronson.com

Devin Bronson (born Seattle, Washington, May 15, 1983) is a guitarist, songwriter and producer based in Los Angeles, having worked with artists such as Avril Lavigne, David Cook and Sebastian Bach. Bronson's versatility on stage and in the studio has carried him to success in a variety of musical platforms, including musical director, spokesperson and business entrepreneur.

== Touring ==
Devin Bronson's path to success began at age 11 when he first began playing guitar. Soon after, Bronson was on stage with bandmates years older than him. His natural talent eventually landed him a touring role at age 18 when he was asked to join Kelly Osbourne's touring band in 2002.

With international touring experience, Bronson joined Treble Charger for their Detox tour from 2003 to 2004, after the departure of lead guitarist Bill Priddle. Bronson was set to join the band in the studio for their 6th album when he accepted the invitation to take over as lead guitarist and musical director for Avril Lavigne's, which was previously held by Evan Taubenfeld.

Bronson's first performance with Avril Lavigne's band was at the 2004 Fashion Rocks! concert in New York where Avril performed 'Iris' by The Goo Goo Dolls with Johnny Rzeznik. Bronson has since joined Lavigne on multiple world tours.

Bronson took time in 2006 to tour with Ashley Parker Angel promoting his single during acoustic shows and TV appearances.

In 2007, Bronson and Taubenfeld began working on an album with producer John Fields for the band The Blacklist Club. The album was ultimate released as a solo album for Taubenfled entitled, "Welcome to the Blacklist Club". Bronson joined Taubenfeld for a full band show at the Roxy in LA and an acoustic set during Avril Lavigne's Fairfax, VA show in 2008.

In the summer of 2008, Bronson joined Butch Walker on stage for a host of shows including Lollapalooza. This led Bronson to working with P!nk whom he joined on stage to promote her single So What during TV appearances including the MTV Music Video Awards.

In 2011, Bronson was asked to join American Idol Season 7 winner David Cook's band. As the band's lead guitarist, Bronson took part in the This Loud Morning Tour as well as multiple TV appearances and international shows.

In 2014, Bronson joined Sebastian Bach on tour. Playing Sum 41 songs, Bronson joined Deryck Whibley and The Happiness Machines in 2015 for a short California tour. In 2016, Bronson played guitar alongside Krewella on their 16-stop Sweatbox Tour, in addition to performing at the Ultra Brasil music festival and Jingle Ball presented by Midnite Events.

== Production and Recordings ==
When not on tour, Bronson writes music for a wide array of TV including Californication on Showtime and Hellcats as well as movies including Friends with Benefits, 22 Jump Street and Home Sweet Hell starring Katherine Heigl.

Bronson puts in studio time collaborating with multiple artists, including work on Mike Posner's 2nd studio album and co-writing 12 Stones "Blind" with Christine Connolly and Tyler Connolly of Theory of a Deadman.

Bronson also played all the guitar solos on Demi Lovato's La La Land single. Co-writer and co-producer Nick Jonas originally wanted Steve Vai, but due to a schedule conflict, Bronson was asked to stepped in.

Bronson is the musical director for 78 Violet duo, Aly & AJ Michalka, co-writing two songs on their upcoming studio album produced by David Kahne. He was also the musical director for "Redd" by U.G.L.Y, the newest addition to Chris Brown's label.

Bronson played guitar and wrote music for Sebastian Bach's Give 'Em Hell 2014 album that also features Duff McKagan from Guns N' Roses.

== Performances ==
Bronson joined Avril Lavigne for TV appearances, music videos and the 2010 Winter Olympics closing ceremony. On April 14, 2007, Bronson performed with Avril Lavigne as the musical guest on the 32nd season of Saturday Night Live, with Shia LaBeouf booked as the host. Bronson appeared in Lavigne's videos for "What the Hell", "Girlfriend," and "Here's to Never Growing Up".

In July 2013, Bronson joined Aly & AJ of 78violet for a live performance at Billboard, New York City, as part of the Tastemakers Sessions series.

== Business endeavors ==
Bronson is co-owner of BN Audio, a San Diego–based audio company that produces high quality audio products. The flagship product of the company is the BlackBox, a high performance speaker system with a built in digital amplifier. Bronson is in charge of brand development and message communication to customers and dealers.

Bronson and Creative Director Adam Parker founded music production/licensing company Noise Candy Music, in 2017. Noise Candy Music has made a name for itself, landing placements in major studio films including Dune, Joker, Ghostbusters: Afterlife, and Five Feet Apart. Since its inception, Noise Candy Music has licensed music for an array of horror films, including It Chapter Two, Pet Sematary, Halloween (2018), and The Curse of La Llorona. In addition to their catalogue of film placements, Bronson and Parker have licensed music for commercials and television series, working with Jeep and on Netflix's The Umbrella Academy.
