= Sebastian Bach =

Canadian singer (born 1968)

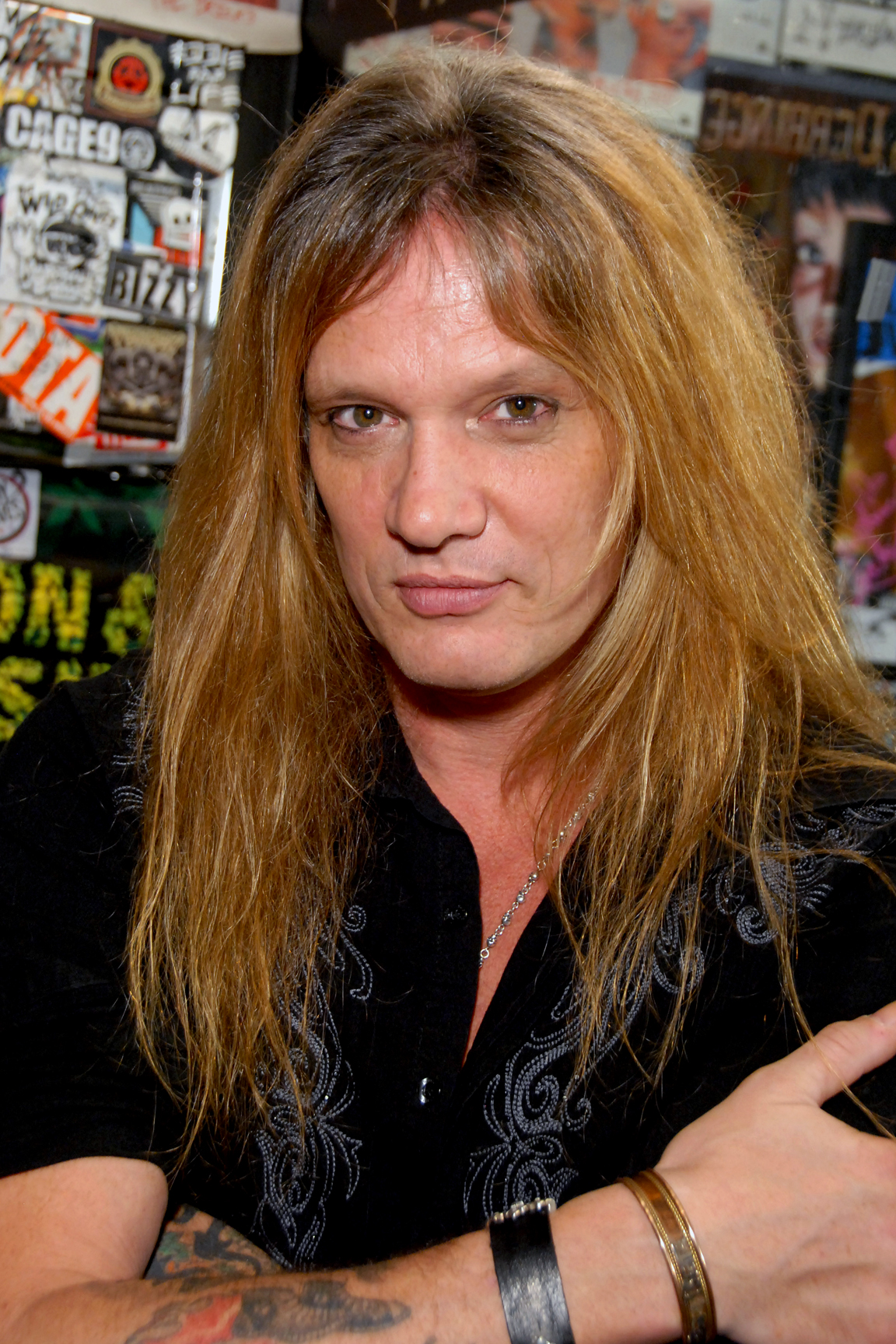
- Bach in 2012

Background information
- Born: Sebastian Philip Bierk; April 3, 1968 (age 58); Freeport, Bahamas
- Origin: Peterborough, Ontario, Canada
- Genres: Hard rock; heavy metal; glam metal
- Occupation: Singer
- Years active: 1983–present
- Labels: Atlantic; Frontiers; Get Off My Bach; Universal; MRV; Reigning Phoenix
- Member of: Twisted Sister
- Formerly of: Skid Row; Madam X; Kid Wikkid; Damnocracy; The Last Hard Men; Big Noize
- Spouses: Maria Aquinar (m. 1992; div. 2010) Suzanne Le (m. 2015)
- Website: sebastianbach.com

Sebastian Philip Bierk (born April 3, 1968), known professionally as Sebastian Bach, is a Canadian hard rock and heavy metal singer, songwriter, and actor who is best known as the frontman of the hard rock band Skid Row from 1987 to 1996. He continues his career as a solo artist and since 2026, as the lead singer of Twisted Sister. Bach has also acted on Broadway and has made appearances in film and television such as Trailer Park Boys, The Masked Singer and Gilmore Girls.

== Early years ==
Bach was born in the Bahamas, the son of artist David Bierk and was raised in Peterborough, Ontario after the family moved to Canada in the early 1970s for his father's teaching job. His father was a noted painter who painted the cover of Skid Row's album Slave to the Grind and the inside cover art of Subhuman Race, as well as the album cover of Bach's solo effort Angel Down and inside art for its follow-up, Give 'Em Hell. Sebastian is one of seven children. His brother Zac Bierk is a former professional ice hockey player.

Bach decided that he wanted to be a singer after he joined a church choir when he was eight years old. He attended Lakefield College School in Lakefield, Ontario.

== Career ==
=== Kid Wikkid (1983–1985) ===
The members of Kid Wikkid were based in Peterborough, Ontario. Upon hearing of the band and unaware of their ages, 14-year-old Bach auditioned for the group, and was hired by guitar player and band leader Jason Delorme.

=== Skid Row (1987–1996) ===
Skid Row initially formed in the mid-1980s with lead vocalist Matt Fallon fronting the group, and they began playing at various clubs around the New Jersey area. Fallon left the band in 1987, leaving Skid Row in search of a lead vocalist. Bach was spotted singing at rock photographer Mark Weiss's wedding by Jon Bon Jovi's parents, who subsequently approached him and suggested he get in touch with their son's friend, Dave Sabo, who was looking for a lead vocalist for his band.

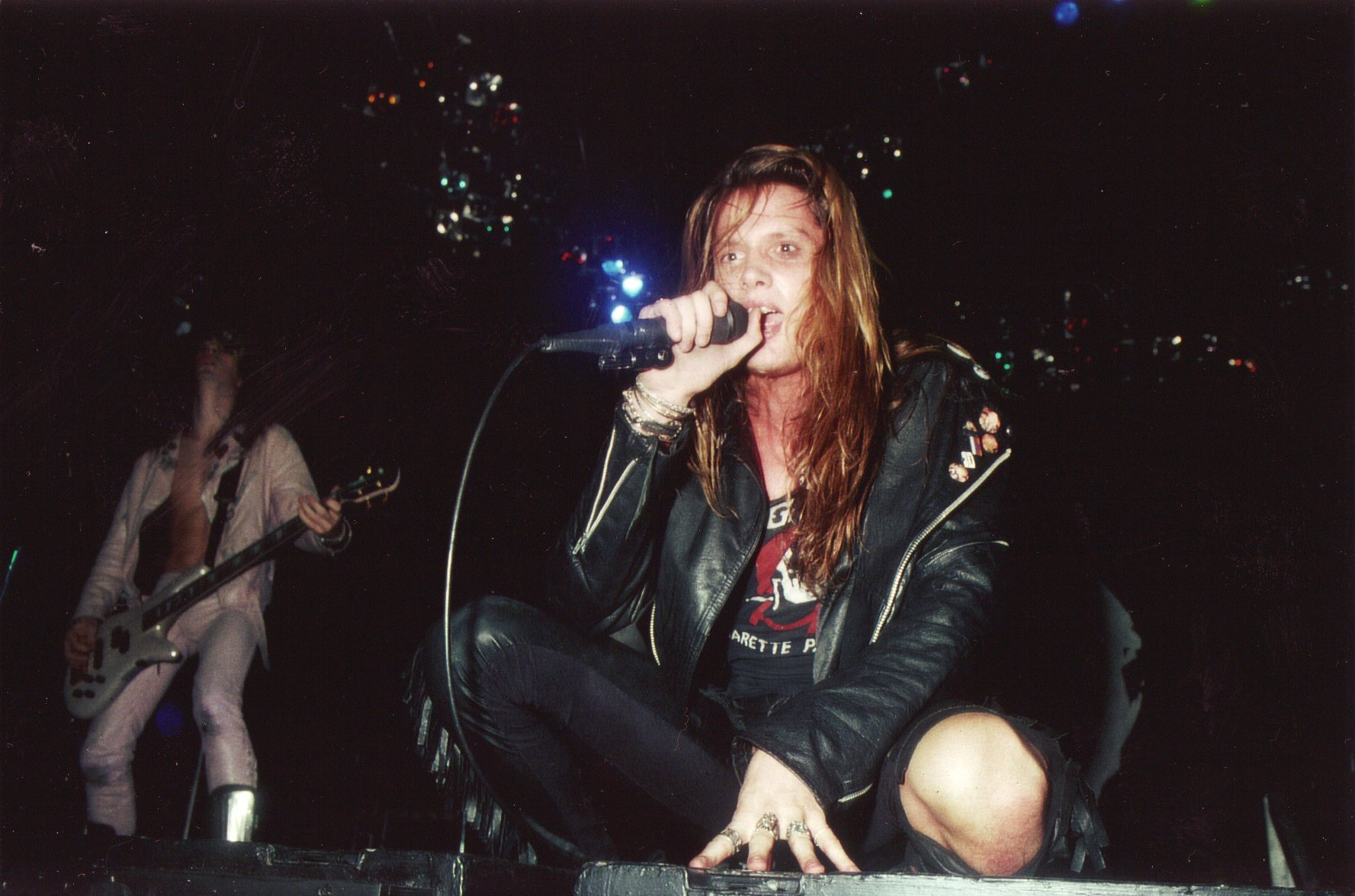
Rachel Bolan (left) and Bach opening for Mötley Crüe in 1989

Following disagreements over musical material and infuriating Bolan, Bach was fired from the band in 1996. However, rumors circulated that he had left the band due to his other bandmates believing they should not play as an opening act for Kiss. Bandmate Rachel Bolan also had a side project, a punk band, Prunella Scales, who were playing at the same time as the planned Kiss show. The rift between Bach and the other band members subsequently led to his leaving Skid Row. Four years later, Skid Row was one of the opening acts for the 2000 Kiss Farewell Tour, without Bach.

=== Broadway and other projects (1996–2006) ===
In 2000, Bach began performing in Broadway productions. He made his Broadway debut with the title role(s) in Jekyll & Hyde in April 2000. He also appeared as Riff Raff in The Rocky Horror Show in 2001. On November 28, 2001 Bach appeared at New York Steel, a benefit concert held in response to 9/11.

In 2003, Bach tried out for Velvet Revolver before the band found Scott Weiland, but was turned down because, according to Slash, "We sounded like Skid Roses!" From 2003 to 2007, Bach had a recurring role on the WB television show Gilmore Girls as "Gil", the lead guitarist in Lane Kim's band, Hep Alien.

=== Reality TV and Angel Down (2006–2010) ===
Bach starred in the 2006 VH1 reality show Supergroup, in which he, along with Ted Nugent, Scott Ian, Jason Bonham and Evan Seinfeld, were tasked with forming a heavy metal supergroup, with Bach as the lead vocalist. The seven-episode series was filmed during a twelve-day period when the musicians all lived together in a mansion in Las Vegas. The resulting band, originally called "Fist", was eventually named Damnocracy; both names were Bach's ideas. Damnocracy had no recorded output.

In 2007, Bach announced a partnership record label with EMI to jointly create a label owned by him, including his album Angel Down, which was released on November 20, 2007. Bach also recorded backing vocals for the track "Sorry" on Guns N' Roses' long-delayed Chinese Democracy, which was released in November 2008. He spent the summer of 2008 playing with Poison and Dokken.

Bach was the winner of the second season of the CMT reality show Gone Country, which aired in 2008.

=== Kicking and Screaming and Sterling's departure (2010–2012) ===
Bach toured as an opening act for Guns N' Roses' "Chinese Democracy Tour" 2009–2010, and performed "My Michelle" with Axl Rose in Quebec City on February 1, 2010. On January 5, 2011, he was featured on NBC's Jimmy Fallon Show in a live performance and a subsequent video of "We Are The Ducks", a power ballad written for University of Oregon Ducks, set to play in the BCS national championship game Monday, January 10, 2011. In 2011, Bach was interviewed by British metalcore band Asking Alexandria in the March/April issue of Revolver. The band are fans of Skid Row and covered two of their songs the preceding year of the interview. The same year, Bach performed "Youth Gone Wild" with the band live at the Revolver Golden Gods Awards and Rock on the Range. Bach was also filmed in their music video "Closure".

Bach provided the voice of Prince Triton, King Neptune's rebellious son, in the SpongeBob SquarePants episode, "SpongeBob and the Clash of Triton" in 2010. On June 15, 2011, Bach revealed the title of his upcoming solo album would be Kicking & Screaming. On July 8, 2011 track list, cover art and title of the first single were revealed. It was released September 27, 2011 for North America and worldwide and September 23, 2011 for Europe on Frontiers Records. On August 13, 2012, Nick Sterling was fired by Bach after refusing to sign an agreement to appear on an undisclosed TV show.

=== Big Noize (2012–2013) ===
Formed in 2007, Big Noize was a supergroup consisting in founder member and drummer Vinny Appice (Black Sabbath, Dio, Heaven & Hell) plus other "monsters" such as guitarist Carlos Cavazo (Quiet Riot), later replaced by George Lynch (Dokken, Lynch Mob), bassist Phil Soussan (Ozzy Osbourne) and vocalist Joe Lynn Turner (Rainbow). Turner was replaced by Bach for the Kavarna Rock festival on July 14, 2012 and for a tour to South America, starting in Chile on July 9, 2013.

=== Give 'Em Hell, touring, and memoir (2013–2023) ===
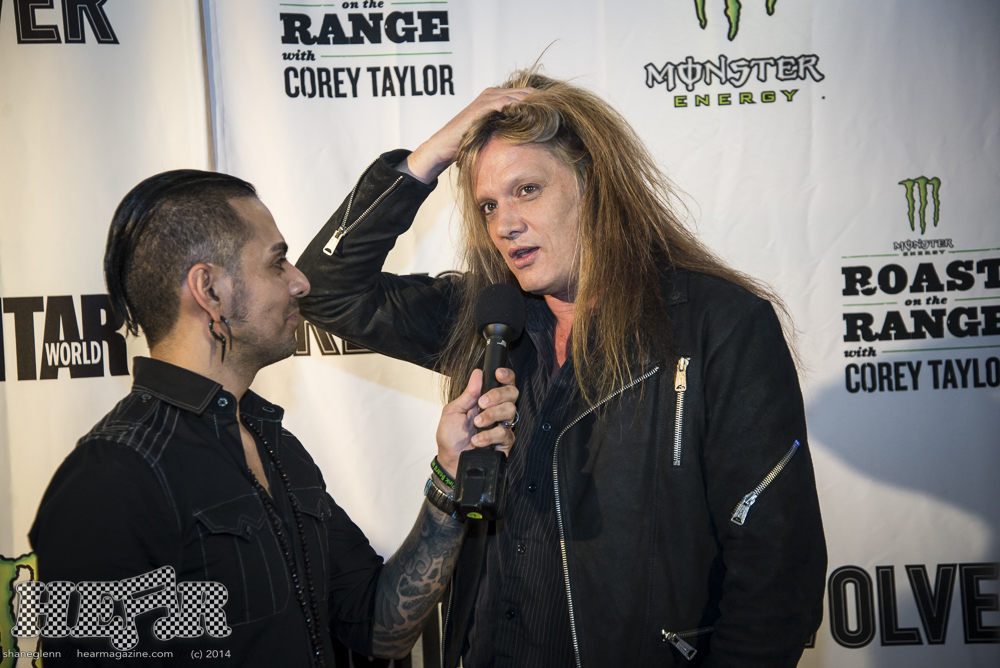
Bach being interviewed in 2014

On April 30, 2013, Bach confirmed via Twitter that a new studio album was in the works. He went on to say that Bob Marlette would be returning as producer. Bach had collaboration work for the upcoming album with John 5, Duff McKagan and Steve Stevens. On January 13, 2014, Give 'Em Hell was announced, with a prospective release date of April 22, 2014. He also appeared in two Trailer Park Boys episodes from their 2014 season. In 2014, Bach completed his Give 'Em Hell Tour. In 2015, he embarked on another tour 18 and Live. In 2016, Bach released a memoir, 18 and Life on Skid Row.

In 2019, Bach toured behind the 30th anniversary of Skid Row's self-titled debut album, playing it live in its entirety. On July 20, 2021, it was announced that Bach would be doing a tour in the fall for the 30th anniversary of Skid Row's Slave to the Grind.

=== Child Within the Man and joining Twisted Sister (2023–present) ===
In 2023, Bach competed in season ten of The Masked Singer as "Tiki". He was eliminated in "I Wanna Rock" alongside Ginuwine as "Husky". Also in December 2023, he released his first new song in nearly ten years, "What Do I Got to Lose?"

In March 2024, Bach announced his sixth album, Child Within the Man. It was released on May 10, 2024.

In early 2026, it was announced that Bach would be replacing Dee Snider as the lead singer of the heavy metal band Twisted Sister.

== Personal life ==
In the mid-1980s, Sebastian Bach began dating Maria Aquinar and the couple had three children; their son, Paris, plays drums in Bach's solo band. Bach and Aquinar split up in April 2010.

In August 2015, Bach married Suzanne Le. The couple currently resides in Las Vegas.

On July 13, 2017, Bach underwent "singing-related" hernia surgery. He started to recover a month later and then explained that the operation was needed, "because [he] literally screamed [his] guts out."

Bach is an avid fan and collector of Kiss memorabilia. His collection contains a rare mirror tied to the 1978 Kiss solo albums, two gargoyles from the Unmasked photo sessions, vintage posters, and other merchandise items.

Bach endorsed Kamala Harris in the 2024 US presidential election.

=== Legal issues ===
On December 27, 1989, Bach was arrested after he tossed a bottle at a fan at the Springfield Civic Center.

On March 13, 2002, Bach was arrested for making terrorist threats and drug possession after a dispute with a bartender in Middletown, New Jersey.

On November 15, 2010, Bach was arrested in Peterborough, Ontario after he allegedly bit a bar employee that was attempting to restrain him. Bach reportedly tried to leave the bar with a glass of wine and when staff told him he could not take the drink outside, Bach smashed the glass against the bar's doors. Police found around two grams of marijuana in Bach's possession.

In May 2011, Bach was arrested after being pulled over in Monmouth County, New Jersey for "failing to keep right". Police found 50 grams of marijuana in his possession.

== Controversies ==
Bach received criticism from AIDS activists after Metal Edge magazine ran a picture of the 21-year-old Skid Row vocalist wearing a T-shirt that read "AIDS kills fags dead". The phrase was a play on the tagline at the time for the insecticide Raid, "Raid Kills Bugs Dead". When asked about the photo on MTV, Bach replied:

I understand it's not cool to make fun of death. I guess nobody gets my jokes. Anyway, a kid threw [the shirt] on stage, I put it on, and all these people got mad at me. But let me just state this—I do not know, condone, comprehend or understand homosexuality in any way, shape, form or size.

In a 2003 interview, when asked about the controversy, he stated:

"That was really stupid and wrong for me to wear that for one half-hour in my life. What nobody brings up is in 2000, when I was in Jekyll & Hyde, and at an auction for Broadway Cares, I donated $12,000 of my own money to fight AIDS."

== Legacy ==
Despite maintaining a mainstream popularity for a short amount of time, the Sebastian Bach-fronted era of Skid Row maintains a lasting presence in the broader heavy metal discourse. In 2025, Ultimate Classic Rock named Bach as number one on a list of top 15 hair metal singers, citing his "enormous vocal range" in "18 and Life" and "I Remember You", and called him "one of the most gifted vocal interpreters of all time". Fozzy vocalist Chris Jericho praised Bach as "the perfect rock star".

== Solo band members ==
=== Current ===
- Sebastian Bach – vocals (1997–present)
- Federico "Fede" Delfino – bass, backing vocals (2024–present)
- Brody DeRozie – guitars, backing vocals (2024–present)
- Paris Bach – drums (2024–present)

=== Former ===
- Mark "Bam Bam" McConnell – drums (1997–2005)
- Jimmy Flemion – guitars (1997–1999)
- Larry Fisher– bass (1997–1999)
- Richie Scarlet – guitars (1998–2002)
- Anton Fig – drums (1998–2000)
- Paul Crook – guitars (1999–2004)
- Johnny Chromatic – guitars (2004–2014)
- Ralph Santolla – guitars (2004–2005)
- Randall X. Rawlings – guitars (2004–2005)
- Adam Albright – guitar (2004–2005)
- Cheeze (né Brian Hall) – bass (2004–2005)
- Mike Dover – drums (2004)
- Bobby Jarzombek – drums (2005–2019)
- "Metal" Mike Chlasciak – guitars (2005–2008)
- Steve Di Giorgio – bass (2005–2007)
- Nick Sterling – guitars (2009–2012)
- Jason Christopher – bass (2012–2014)
- Jeff George – guitars (2012–2013)
- Devin Bronson – guitars (2013–2014)
- Brent Woods – guitars (2014–2024)
- Rob De Luca – bass (2005–2012, 2014–2024)
- Jeremy Colson – drums (2019–2024)
- Clay Eubank – bass (2024)

== Discography ==
=== With Skid Row ===
- Skid Row (1989)
- Slave to the Grind (1991)
- Subhuman Race (1995)

=== With the Last Hard Men ===
- The Last Hard Men (1998)

=== Solo ===
- Angel Down (2007)
- Kicking & Screaming (2011)
- Give 'Em Hell (2014)
- Child Within the Man (2024)

== Filmography ==
=== Film ===
Year	Title	Role	Notes
1992	A Year and a Half in the Life of Metallica	Himself	Joking backstage with Slash and Lars Ulrich, imitating MTV host Riki Rachtman and former guitarist Dave Mustaine during 1992 stadium tour
1999	Final Rinse	Buddy	
2000	Point Doom	Slim	
2009	Trailer Park Boys: Countdown to Liquor Day	Randy's Customer / John	Uncredited
2010	Rush: Beyond the Lighted Stage	Himself	
2012	Asking Alexandria: Through Sin and Self-Destruction	Himself	
2012	Rock of Ages	Rocker	
2013	Sebastian Bach: Kicking and Screaming and Touring	Himself	
2013	Yukon Kornelius	Himself	Television film
2014	Swearnet: The Movie	Himself	
2016	Deserted	Archer	
2017	American Satan	Himself	Uncredited

=== Television ===
Year	Title	Role	Notes
1993	Saturday Night Live	Himself	Episode: "Charles Barkley/Nirvana"
2000	MTV Cribs	Himself	
2001	Strange Frequency	Grim Reaper	Episode: "Don't Fear the Reaper"
2002	I Love the '80s	Himself	
2002	Never Mind the Buzzcocks	Himself	
2003	I Love the '80s Strikes Back	Himself	
2003–2007	Gilmore Girls	Gil	13 episodes
2004	Kiss Loves You	Himself	
2004	I Love the '90s	Himself	
2006	Heavy: The Story of Metal	Himself	
2006	Supergroup	Himself	7 episodes
2007	Celebrity Rap Superstar	Himself	
2007–2014	Trailer Park Boys	Himself	7 episodes
2008	Robot Chicken	Wildman; Martian Manhunter	Voice; episode: "They Took My Thumbs"
2008	Z Rock	Himself	Episode: "Paul and David Nearly Miss a Huge Gig"
2008	VH1 100 Greatest Hard Rock Songs	Himself	
2008–2009	Gone Country	Himself	8 episodes
2010	Celebrity Fit Club	Himself	5 episodes
2010	SpongeBob SquarePants	Triton	Voice, episode: "The Clash of Triton"
2011	Adults Only	Shifty	
2012	The Eric André New Year's Eve Spooktacular	Himself	
2013	Californication	Tony	Episode: "Dead Rock Stars"
2014	Sing Your Face Off	Himself	6 episodes
2016	Gilmore Girls: A Year in the Life	Gil	Episode: "Winter"
2016–2017	Trailer Park Boys: Out of the Park	Himself	4 episodes
2022	Hell's Kitchen	Himself	Episode: "Slipping Down to Hell"
2023	The Masked Singer	Himself/Tiki	Season 10 contestant; 3 episodes
2024	Worst Cooks in America	Himself	Season 28 contestant; 3 episodes

=== Stage ===
Year	Title	Role	Notes
2000	Jekyll & Hyde	Dr. Henry Jekyll / Edward Hyde	
2001	The Rocky Horror Show	Riff Raff	
2002–2003	Jesus Christ Superstar	Jesus of Nazareth	
2004	Jekyll & Hyde	Dr. Henry Jekyll / Edward Hyde	Raleigh Memorial Auditorium
