= Beau Bell (American football) =

American gridiron football player (born 1986)

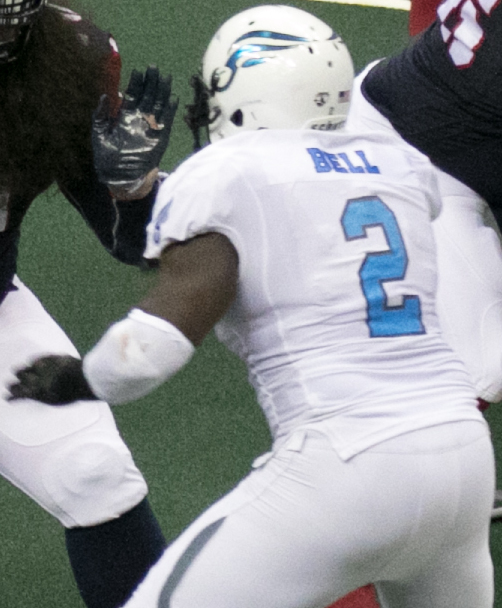
- Bell with the Philadelphia Soul in 2017

No. 58, 2
- Position: Linebacker

Personal information
- Born: May 26, 1986 (age 40); Tustin, California, U.S.
- Listed height: 6 ft 2 in (1.88 m)
- Listed weight: 243 lb (110 kg)

Career information
- High school: Tustin
- College: UNLV
- NFL draft: 2008: 4th round, 104th overall pick

Career history
- Cleveland Browns (2008); Omaha Nighthawks (2010)*; Spokane Shock (2011–2013); Las Vegas Locomotives (2011)*; BC Lions (2012)*; Los Angeles Kiss (2014); Philadelphia Soul (2015–2017)
- * Offseason or practice squad member only

Awards and highlights
- 2× ArenaBowl champion (2016, 2017); AFL Defensive Player of the Year (2017); 2× First-team All-Arena (2014, 2017); MW Defensive Player of the Year (2007); First-team All-MW (2007); Second-team All-MW (2005)

Career NFL statistics
- Total tackles: 3
- Stats at Pro Football Reference

Career AFL statistics
- Totals tackles: 255.5
- Sacks: 49.5
- Interceptions: 3
- Defensive touchdowns: 2
- Stats at ArenaFan.com

James Beaumont "Beau" Bell (born May 26, 1986) is an American former professional football player who was a linebacker in the National Football League (NFL) and Arena Football League (AFL). He was selected by the Cleveland Browns in the fourth round of the 2008 NFL draft. He played college football for the UNLV Rebels. Bell was also a member of the Omaha Nighthawks, Las Vegas Locomotives, Spokane Shock, BC Lions, Los Angeles Kiss, and Philadelphia Soul.

== Early life ==
James Beaumont Bell was born on May 26, 1986, in Tustin, California. He played high school football at Tustin High School in Tustin, California.

== College career ==
Bell played inside linebacker at UNLV. Bell was the 2007 Mountain West Conference Defensive MVP. He played 41 games at UNLV and started 26. He was named league player of the week four times, tying the school record set by former Rebel Randall Cunningham.

== Professional career ==
Bell was selected by the Cleveland Browns in the fourth round (104th overall) of the 2008 NFL draft. He was waived on September 5, 2009.

Bell signed with the Omaha Nighthawks of the United Football League (UFL) on August 12, 2010. He was released on September 9, 2010, before the start of the 2010 UFL season.

Bell played for the Spokane Shock of the Arena Football League (AFL) from 2011 to 2013.

Bell was signed by the UFL's Las Vegas Locomotives on August 10, 2011. He was released toward the end of training camp.

On May 17, 2012, Bell was signed by the BC Lions of the Canadian Football League. He was released on June 18, 2012.

Bell played for the AFL's Los Angeles Kiss in 2014.

On February 20, 2015, the Kiss Bell traded to the Philadelphia Soul in exchange for Derrick Ross. On January 28, 2016, Bell was assigned to the Soul for the 2016 season. On August 26, 2016, the Soul beat the Arizona Rattlers in ArenaBowl XXIX by a score of 56–42. He earned first-team All-Arena honors in 2017. On August 26, 2017, the Soul beat the Tampa Bay Storm in ArenaBowl XXX by a score of 44–40.

== Post-playing career ==
In March 2018, it was announced that Bell had joined the Albany Empire as the team's Director of Player Personnel and Pass Rush Coordinator.

In 2019, Bell returned to the Philadelphia Soul and was Promoted to General Manager / Assistant Head Coach.

On May 12, 2024, Bell was hired by the Miami Dolphins to serve as a pro scout.
