= Chasin' Crazy =

American country music group (2012–2017)

- Origin: Nashville, Tennessee, United States
- Genres: Country
- Years active: 2012–2017
- Labels: RPM Entertainment
- Past members: Landon Parker; Travis Fincher; Jimmy James Hunter; Creigh Riepe; Forest Miller

Chasin' Crazy was an American country music group composed of Landon Parker (acoustic guitar, vocals), Travis Fincher (drums, vocals), Jimmy James Hunter (lead guitar, vocals), Creigh Riepe (keyboards, guitar, vocals) and Forest Miller (bass, fiddle, mandolin, vocals). The group formed in Nashville, Tennessee in 2012, and was active through about 2017, after which members (including Parker) pursued solo work.

They signed to RPM Entertainment and released the debut single, "That's How We Do Summertime", in April 2014, produced by Marti Frederiksen and Blake Chancey. The track debuted at number 59 on Billboard Country Airplay (week of May 31, 2014) and ultimately peaked at number 47, charting for 13 weeks. A music video for the song premiered August 12, 2014. The follow-up single "Smack Dab" was released in August 2014, and the group later issued "Trespassin'" in October 2015, with an accompanying video.

A reality series about the band, also titled Chasin' Crazy, aired on Great American Country and premiered October 11, 2014.

== Discography ==
=== Singles ===
Year	Single	Peak positions	Notes
Year	Single	US Country Airplay	Notes
2014	"That's How We Do Summertime"	47	RPM Entertainment; released April 2014.
2014	"Smack Dab"	—	RPM Entertainment; released August 2014.
2015	"Trespassin'"	—	Released October 2015; video issued via VEVO/YouTube.
"—" denotes a release that did not chart or was not released to the format.

=== Music videos ===
Year	Video	Director
2014	"That's How We Do Summertime"	Steve Bates
2015	"Trespassin'"	

== Notes ==
- As of 2025, the former band domain chasincrazy.com is used by an unrelated Central New York bar band and is not affiliated with the Nashville act described in this article.
