= Evan Seinfeld =

American musician (born 1967)

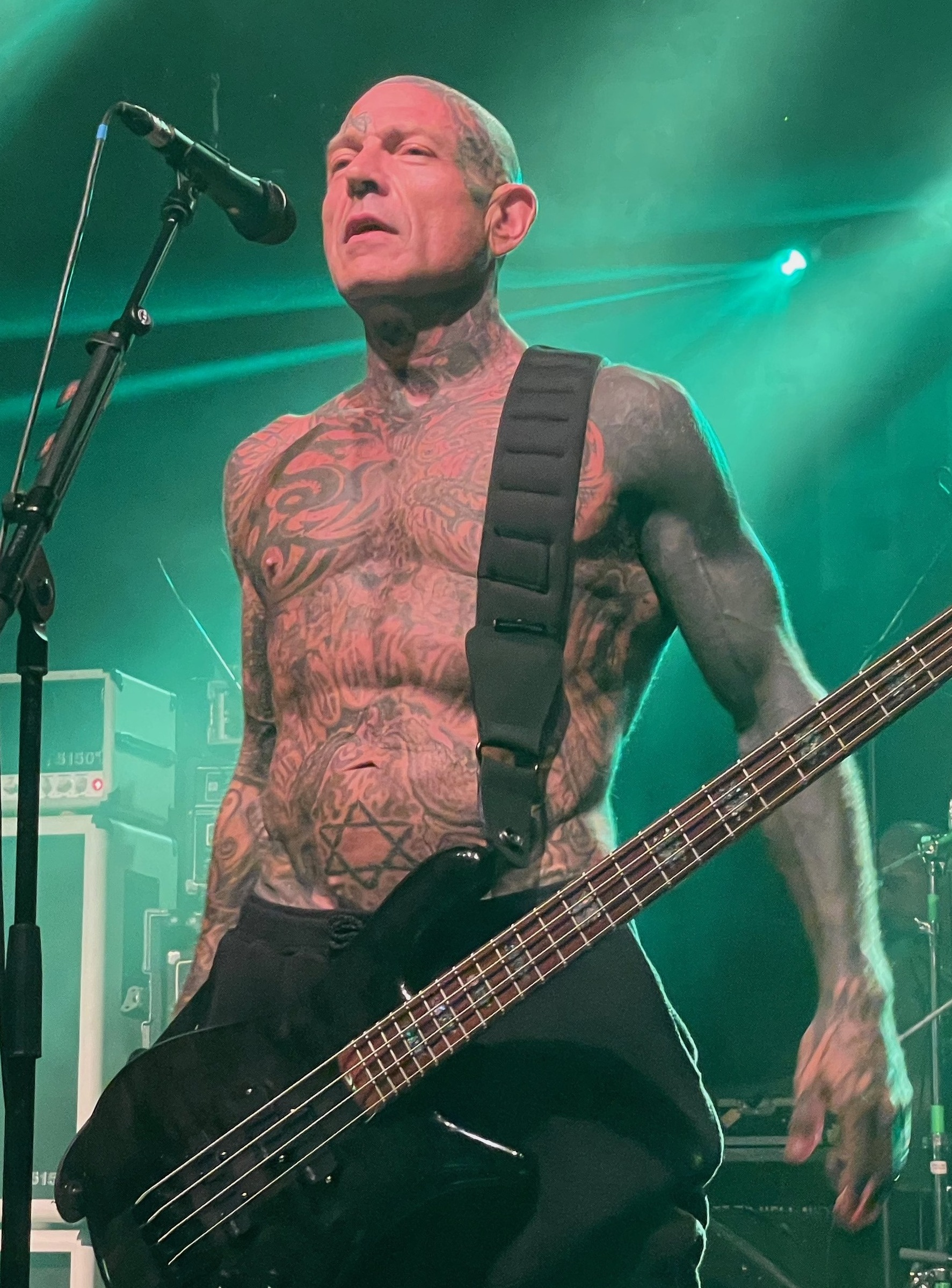
- Seinfeld with Biohazard in 2023

Background information
- Also known as: Spyder Jonez
- Born: November 1967 (age 58–59); Brooklyn, New York City, U.S.
- Genres: Hardcore punk; rap metal; groove metal
- Occupations: Musician; actor; film director; writer; photographer
- Instruments: Vocals; bass guitar
- Member of: Biohazard; Attika7
- Formerly of: Damnocracy
- Spouses: Tera Patrick (m. 2004; div. 2009) Lupe Fuentes (m. 2011; div. 2020)
- Website: instagram.com/evanseinfeld

Evan Seinfeld (born November 1967) is an American musician and former pornographic actor, writer and director. He is best known as the lead vocalist, bassist, and founding member of the hardcore/metal band Biohazard. Seinfeld left the band in May 2011 citing personal reasons, but rejoined in October 2022 after performing with several other acts.

== Career ==
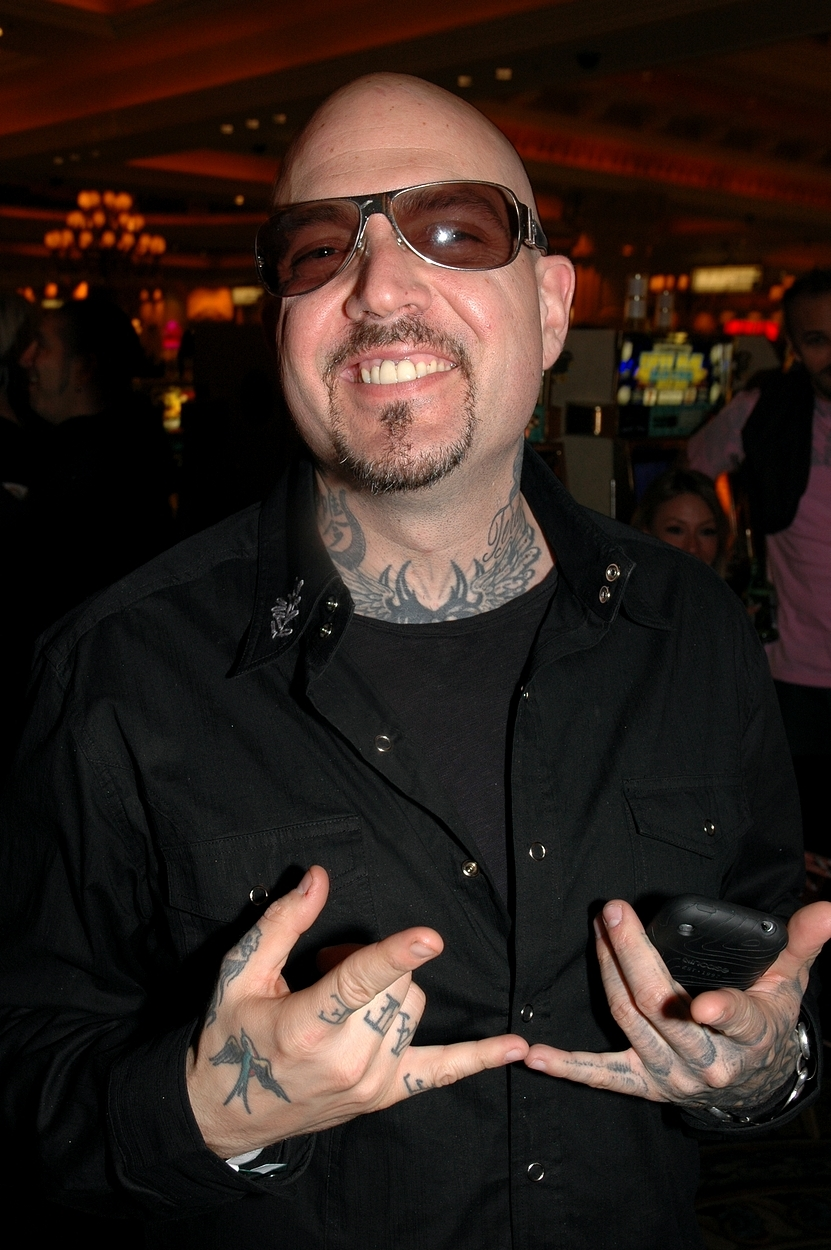
Seinfield in 2008

=== Music ===
Seinfeld is the founder, bassist and vocalist for the New York hardcore/heavy metal band Biohazard. He founded the band in 1987 but left in early 2011 before rejoining in 2022. He was also the bassist for the short-lived supergroup Damnocracy, featured in the VH1 reality television show Supergroup, with other members including Ted Nugent, Sebastian Bach, Scott Ian and Jason Bonham. In March 2007, Evan Seinfeld debuted his new band, The Spyderz, as an opening act for a Buckcherry performance. The band was originally named White Line Fever until it was discovered that a UK band already owned the name. The Spyderz also featured guitarist John Monte, formerly of Ministry, M.O.D. and The Disparrows vocalist Daniel Weber. In October 2008, Seinfeld briefly joined Tattooed Millionaires as a bassist and co-vocalist.

In 2011, Seinfeld joined Attika7, a band featuring former members of Walls of Jericho, Static-X, Soulfly, and Possessed. The band's debut album, Blood of My Enemies, was released on July 31, 2012.

On July 25, 2019, Seinfeld debuted the first single from his newest musical project SVG$ via YouTube. The song is titled "Authentic" and is Seinfeld's debut as a hip-hop artist. He rejoined Biohazard in October 2022.

=== Acting ===
Seinfeld portrayed Jaz Hoyt in the HBO prison drama Oz for a total of 40 episodes, spanning the majority of the series' six-year run. His character was the leader of the prison's biker gang and an ally of the Aryan Brotherhood, a white supremacist gang. He showed his full frontal nudity in some scenes of the series. In certain episodes of season 6, the Star of David tattoo on Seinfeld's stomach can be clearly seen.

Seinfeld, who was married to pornographic actress Tera Patrick, has performed with her in seven films under the stage name Spyder Jonez, including Reign of Tera, Teradise Island (which he also directed), Tera, Tera, Tera, and Desperate. He also performed in duo scenes with women other than Tera Patrick. He owns a production company, Iron Cross Entertainment and Teravison, with Tera Patrick, as well as his own "Rockstar Pornstar" website.

Seinfeld and Patrick appear in a number of celebrity TV series such as E! True Hollywood Story "Rockstar Wives", G4TV's A Day in the Life of Tera Patrick, VH1's Greatest Metal Songs, and WE's Secret Lives of Women.

Seinfeld appeared in the independent films Angry Dogs, Kiss Me Now, and Wizard of Gore. Both he and Patrick appeared in the documentary Fuck.

Seinfeld has voice acted in several Rockstar Games, voicing a Skin in Manhunt, the Honkers bouncer in Grand Theft Auto IV, and several gangsters in The Warriors, including Hog, Nails, Kevin K, and Fleece.

=== Other appearances ===
He is one of the characters in the book Sex Tips from Rock Stars by Paul Miles, published in July 2010 from Omnibus Press.

On November 21, 2011, he appeared on The Real Housewives of Beverly Hills performing in Ace Young's band for Taylor Armstrong's daughter's fifth birthday party.

In 2022, Seinfeld appeared as himself in Sell/Buy/Date directed by Sarah Jones.

== Personal life ==
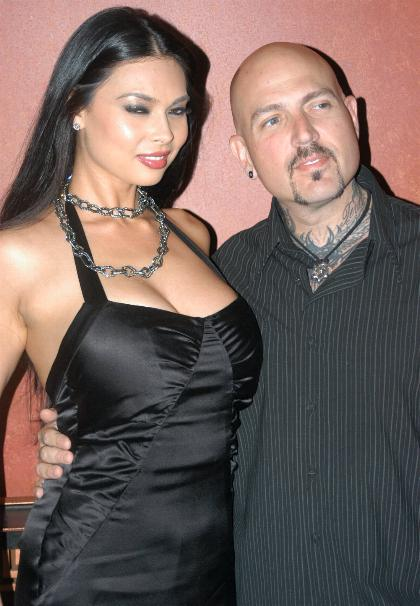
Seinfeld with his former wife Tera Patrick at the XRCO Awards 2007

Seinfeld is Jewish. He is a second cousin of comedian and actor Jerry Seinfeld.

After a three-year relationship, Seinfeld married pornographic actress Tera Patrick in a small ceremony on January 9, 2004. The ceremony was held in Las Vegas where they were attending the 2004 AVN Awards show. The couple announced on September 30, 2009, that they were ending their marriage, but that they would remain business partners.

In 2011, Seinfeld married singer and former pornographic actress Lupe Fuentes. They later divorced in 2020.

Seinfeld is the founder of subscription service IsMyGirl, and men's mental health and wellness platform Mantorship.

== Awards ==
- 2008 XBIZ Award – Crossover Male Star of the Year
- 2009 XBIZ Award – ASACP Service Recognition Award
