= Howard Johnson (soul singer) =

American singer

- Born: November 28, 1956 (age 69); Miami, Florida, United States
- Genres: Soul, disco, urban, boogie
- Years active: 1977–present
- Label: A&M Records

Howard Williams Johnson (born November 28, 1956, in Miami, Florida) is an American soul/disco singer, and founder of the group Niteflyte. He charted two songs on the Hot Dance Music/Club Play chart during the 1980s – "So Fine", which spent one week at No. 1 in 1982, and "Let This Dream Be Real", which reached No. 19 in 1983.

== Career ==
R&B vocalist Howard Johnson started out in Miami, performing in local bars and clubs until the appearance of a life-changing business contact. That was Sandy Torano, a guitarist and producer associated with performers such as the Commodores and Phyllis Hyman. Johnson was his choice for a new vocalist and thus began the singer's recording career in 1977, as the group Niteflyte under Ariola records. The project lasted for only two albums but A&M later signed Johnson to a solo contract.

A trio of close associates - Kashif, Paul Laurence Jones, and Morris Brown - produced Keepin' Love New (1982), Johnson's first album. Both "So Fine" and the title track did very well in the UK Singles Chart. The singer recorded two more albums for the label: Doin' It My Way (1983), produced by the System, and The Vision (1985), some of which was handled by Jimmy Jam and Terry Lewis. In 1986, Johnson recorded the ballad "Perfect Timing" with singer Donna Allen which appeared on her debut album of the same name. In 1989, the singer returned to A&M as part of the duo Johnson & Branson with Regis Branson.

Johnson kept a low profile during the 90s. He returned in the new millennium collaborating again with Regis Branson. He released Packed and Waitin' on Soul Japan Records in 2002. Roughly a decade later, Johnson's A&M albums were reissued by the Netherlands' PTG label.

== Discography ==
=== Studio albums ===
Year	Album	Peak chart positions	
Year	Album	US	US R&B
1982	Keepin' Love New	122	—
1983	Doin' It My Way	—	61
1985	The Vision	—	46
1989	Johnson and Branson (with Regis Branson)	—	—
2002	Packed and Waitin' (Japan only, with Regis Branson)	—	—
2010	Howard Johnson	—	—
2012	The Orange Album	—	—
2013	Jet Black Casanova	—	—
"—" denotes releases that did not chart.

=== Compilations ===
- Howard Johnson – Doin' It My Way / The Vision (2007)

=== Singles ===
Year	Single	Peak chart positions			Album
Year	Single	US Dance	US R&B	UK	Album
1982	"So Fine"	1	6	45	Keepin' Love New
1982	"Say You Wanna"	—	—	—	Keepin' Love New
1982	"Keepin' Love New"	—	47	—	Keepin' Love New
1983	"Let This Dream Be Real"	19	58	—	Doin' It My Way
1983	"Let's Take Time Out"	—	30	—	Doin' It My Way
1985	"Knees"	—	—	—	The Vision
1985	"Older Girl"	—	—	—	The Vision
1985	"Stand Up"	—	29	91	The Vision
1986	"Perfect Timing" (with Donna Allen)	—	—	—	Perfect Timing (by Donna Allen)
"—" denotes releases that did not chart or were not released in that territory.
