= Gary Corbett =

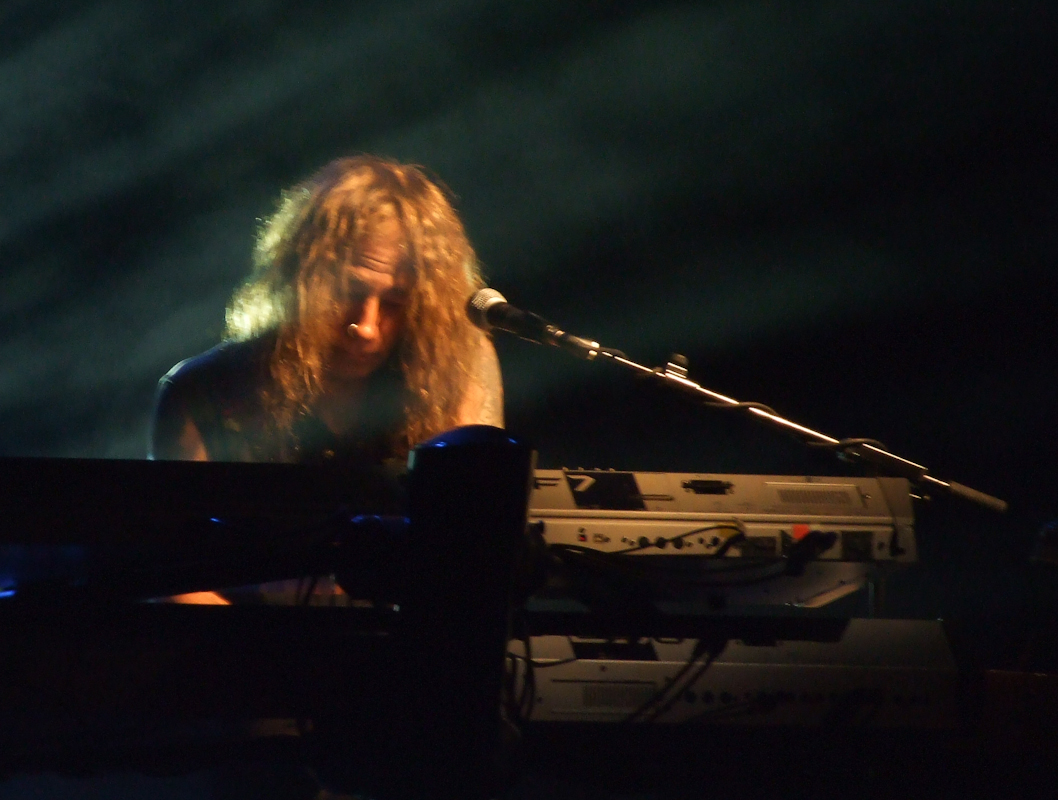
- Gary Corbett with Cinderella at Festivalna Hall, Sofia, June 15, 2011

Background information
- Born: Gary Corbett; July 15, 1958
- Origin: Hendersonville, Tennessee, U.S.
- Died: July 14, 2021 (aged 62)
- Genres: Heavy metal Hard rock
- Occupation: Keyboardist
- Instruments: Keyboards, piano
- Years active: 1984–2021
- Formerly of: Cinderella
- Website: Gary Corbett's Myspace page Cinderella Official Site

Gary Corbett (July 15, 1958 – July 14, 2021) (from Hendersonville, Tennessee) was an American keyboardist, composer and producer most famous for playing in the glam metal band Cinderella.

Corbett had contributed in various capacities to over 27 albums. In addition to his work with Cinderella he has toured with Kiss, Lou Gramm, has worked with all of Bob Marley's sons. In the 1980s, Corbett co-wrote "She Bop" with Cyndi Lauper.

Big Noise was a side project Corbett had been involved in, playing in Iraq for the U.S. Army in 2009.

Corbett died of lung cancer on July 14, 2021, aged 62, the day before his 63rd birthday.
