= Niteflyte =

American funk group

- Origin: United States
- Genres: Funk; soul
- Years active: 1979–1981, 2003
- Labels: Ariola Records
- Past members: Howard Johnson; Sandy Torano

Niteflyte was an American funk group, whose main members were Howard Johnson and Sandy Torano. They released an album on Ariola Records in 1979, which peaked at #59 on the Billboard Soul Albums chart, and a single, "If You Want It", which hit #37 on the U.S. Billboard Hot 100 chart.

A second album followed in 1981 on Ariola, but failed to attain the success they had. After the album's release, the band split and Johnson embarked on a solo career.

== Discography ==
=== Albums ===
Year	Album	Chart positions
Year	Album	US R&B
1979	Niteflyte	59
1981	Niteflyte II	—

=== Singles ===
Year	Title	Chart positions	
Year	Title	US	US R&B
1979	"If You Want It"	37	21
1980	"All About Love"	—	97
1981	"You're Breaking My Heart"	—	—
1981	"You Are"	—	79
"—" denotes the release failed to chart
