= Sebastian Bach discography =

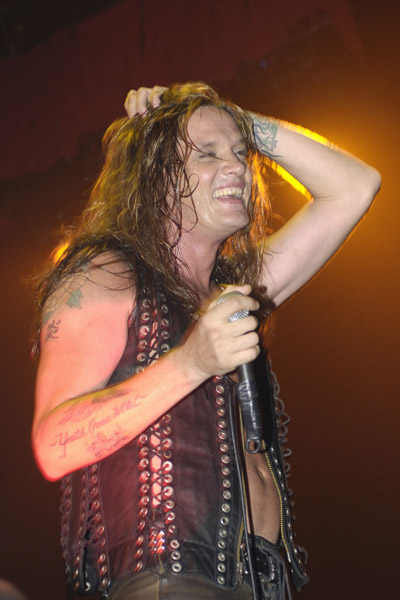
- Bach performing in 2006
- Studio albums: 4
- Extended plays: 1
- Live albums: 2
- Compilation albums: 1
- Singles: 18
- Video albums: 4
- Music videos: 14

The discography of Canadian heavy metal singer Sebastian Bach consists of four studio albums, one live album, one compilation album, one EP, eight singles, and various videos. This list include all solo material or side projects performed by Bach.

== Solo discography ==
=== Studio albums ===
| Title | Album details | Peak chart positions | | Sales |
| Title | Album details | US | JPN | Sales |
|---|---|---|---|---|
| Angel Down | Release date: November 20, 2007; Label: Caroline | 191 | 52 | WW: 100,000+; US: 6,000+ |
| Kicking & Screaming | Release date: September 27, 2011; Label: Frontiers | 73 | 73 | US: 6,000+ |
| Give 'Em Hell | Release date: April 22, 2014; Label: Frontiers | 72 | 178 | US: 4,000+ |
| Child Within the Man | Release date: May 10, 2024; Label: Reigning Phoenix Music | — | 41 | |

=== Extended plays ===
| Title | Album details |
|---|---|
| Finding My Way | Release date: October 1, 2009; Label: Deadline Music |

=== Live albums ===
| Title | Album details | Peak chart positions | Sales |
| Title | Album details | JPN | Sales |
|---|---|---|---|
| Bring 'Em Bach Alive! | Release date: November 2, 1999; Label: Spitfire | 95 | US: 16,979+ |
| ABachalypse Now | Release date: March 22, 2013; Label: Frontiers | — | |
"—" denotes a recording that did not chart or was not released in that territory.

=== Compilation albums ===
| Title | Album details |
|---|---|
| Bach 2: Basics | Release date: 2001; Label: Self-released |

=== Singles ===
| Year | Single | Peak chart positions | Album |
| Year | Single | SWE | Album |
|---|---|---|---|
| 1998 | "Superjerk, Superstar, Supertears" | — | Bring 'Em Bach Alive! |
| 1999 | "Rock N Roll" | — | Bring 'Em Bach Alive! |
| 2007 | "Back in the Saddle" (Aerosmith cover; feat. Axl Rose) | — | Angel Down |
| 2007 | "(Love Is) a Bitchslap" (feat. Axl Rose) | 4 | Angel Down |
| 2008 | "By Your Side" | — | Angel Down |
| 2008 | "You Don't Understand" | — | Angel Down |
| 2008 | "Falling into You" | — | Angel Down |
| 2008 | "Battle with the Bottle" | — | non-album single |
| 2011 | "Kicking & Screaming" | — | Kicking & Screaming |
| 2011 | "My Own Worst Enemy" | — | Kicking & Screaming |
| 2011 | "I'm Alive" | — | Kicking & Screaming |
| 2014 | "Temptation" | — | Give 'Em Hell |
| 2024 | "What Do I Got to Lose?" | — | Child Within the Man |
| 2024 | "Everybody Bleeds" | — | Child Within the Man |
| 2024 | "(Hold On) to the Dream" | — | Child Within the Man |
| 2024 | "Freedom" | — | Child Within the Man |
| 2024 | "Future of Youth" | — | Child Within the Man |
| 2025 | "To Live Again" | — | Child Within the Man |
"—" denotes releases that did not chart

=== Videography ===
==== Video albums ====
| Title | Album details | Peak chart positions |
| Title | Album details | JPN |
|---|---|---|
| Forever Wild | Release date: June 15, 2004; Label: Eagle Vision | 232 |
| Road Rage | Release date: November 20, 2008; Label: Caroline | — |
| As Long As I Got The Music | Release date: September 27, 2011; Label: Frontiers | — |
| ABachalypse Now | Release date: March 22, 2013; Label: Frontiers | — |
"—" denotes a recording that did not chart or was not released in that territory.

==== Music videos ====
| Year | Title | Directed |
|---|---|---|
| 2007 | "(Love Is) a Bitchslap" | — |
| 2008 | "Battle with the Bottle" | Wayne Isham |
| 2011 | "Kicking & Screaming" | Devin DeHaven |
| 2011 | "Tunnelvision" | — |
| 2011 | "I'm Alive" | Devin DeHaven |
| 2014 | "Temptation" | Patrick Fogarty |
| 2014 | "Taking Back Tomorrow" (lyric video) | — |
| 2014 | "All My Friends Are Dead" | — |
| 2024 | "What Do I Got to Lose?" | — |
| 2024 | "Everybody Bleeds" | — |
| 2024 | "(Hold On) to the Dream" | — |
| 2024 | "Freedom" | — |
| 2024 | "Future of Youth" | — |
| 2025 | "To Live Again" | — |

=== Other appearances ===
- Trouble Walkin' – Ace Frehley, backing vocals on "Back to School" (1989)
- Dr. Feelgood – Mötley Crüe, backing vocals on "Time for Change" (1989)
- Believe in Me – Duff McKagan, vocals on "Trouble" (1993)
- Acid Eaters – Ramones, backing vocals on "Out of Time" (1993)
- Working Man - A Tribute to Rush, lead vocals on "Working Man" & "Jacob's Ladder" (1995)
- Spacewalk: A Salute to Ace Frehley, lead vocals on "Rock Bottom" (1996)
- Thunderbolt: A Tribute to AC/DC, lead vocals on "Little Lover" & "TNT" (1998)
- Slave to the Power: The Iron Maiden Tribute, lead vocals on "Children of the Damned" (2000)
- Randy Rhoads Tribute - A Tribute to Randy Rhoads, lead vocals on "Believer", "Crazy Train" & "I Don't Know" (2000)
- Twisted Forever – A Tribute to Twisted Sister, lead vocals on "You Can't Stop Rock 'N Roll" (2001)
- Sophie – BulletBoys, backing vocals on "Neighborhood" (2003)
- Soundtrack of a Soul – Liberty N' Justice, lead vocals on "Another Nail" (2006)
- Trailer Park Boys – Season 7 (2007)
- 4-All:The Best of LNJ – Liberty N' Justice, lead vocals on "Another Nail" (2008)
- Chinese Democracy – Guns N' Roses, backing vocals on "Sorry" (2008)
- Heavy Hitters – Michael Schenker Group, lead vocals on "I Don't Live Today" (2008)
- Siam Shade Tribute, lead vocals on "Don't Tell Lies" (2010)
- Todos Os Meus Passos – Kiara Rocks, backing vocals on "Careless Whisper" (2012)
- Slave to the Empire – T&N, lead vocals on "Alone Again" (2012)
- Born to Rage non-album single – Dada Life, lead vocals (2013)
- Randy Rhoads Remembered Volume 1, lead vocals on "SATO" (2015)
- Magic Power: All Star Tribute to Triumph, lead vocals on "24 Hours a Day" & "Rock & Roll Machine" (2025)
- Black Flame – Nuclear Messiah, lead vocals on "Look at Yourself" (2026)
- The Transformers: The Movie Soundtrack: The Reformatted Edition, lead vocals on "Nothin's Gonna Stand in Our Way" (2026)
- Teutonic Titans 1976-2026 – Accept, lead vocals on "London Leatherboys" (2026)

== With Kid Wikkid ==
1985 Kid Wikkid / "Maple Metal" / LP & cassette / Attic Records / "Take a Look at Me" / Canada

== With Skid Row ==
- Basement Tapes (rare demo) (1988)
- Skid Row (1989)
- Slave to the Grind (1991)
- B-Side Ourselves (EP) (1992)
- Subhuman Race (1995)
- 40 Seasons: The Best of Skid Row (1998)

=== Live ===
- Subhuman Beings on Tour (EP) (1995)

=== Videos ===
- Oh Say Can You Scream (1991)
- No Frills Video (1993)
- Road Kill (1993)

== With The Last Hard Men ==
- The Last Hard Men (1998, re-released in 2001)

== With Frameshift ==
- An Absence of Empathy (2005)
