= 40 Seasons: The Best of Skid Row =

Greatest hits album by Skid Row
- Released: November 3, 1998
- Recorded: 1988–1995
- Genres: Heavy metal, glam metal
- Length: 66:23
- Label: Atlantic

Skid Row chronology
Subhuman Beings on Tour (1995)	40 Seasons: The Best of Skid Row (1998)	Thickskin (2003)

Professional ratings
Review scores
Source	Rating
AllMusic	4/5 stars
Collector's Guide to Heavy Metal	7/10
Stereo & Video	3/5 stars

40 Seasons: The Best of Skid Row is a greatest hits album by American heavy metal band Skid Row, released in November, 3, 1998. It includes the chart-topping singles "18 and Life", "I Remember You" and "Youth Gone Wild".

== Content ==
The compilation features songs from the first three Skid Row studio albums Skid Row, Slave to the Grind and Subhuman Race. The tracks "Into Another", "My Enemy" and "Breakin' Down" were remixed for this album with more tender, slightly cleaner mixes, presumably so they fit more suitingly with the other tracks. It also includes two unreleased tracks, one from the 1988 Skid Row sessions, and one from the 1990–91 Slave to the Grind sessions. The Japanese version features a bonus track from the B-Side Ourselves EP.

== Track listing ==
All tracks are written by Rachel Bolan and Dave Sabo, except where noted.

No.	Title	Writer(s)	Original album	Length
1.	"Youth Gone Wild"		Skid Row (1989)	3:21
2.	"18 and Life"		Skid Row	3:49
3.	"Piece of Me"	Bolan	Skid Row	2:48
4.	"I Remember You"		Skid Row	5:14
5.	"The Threat"		Slave to the Grind (1991)	3:48
6.	"Psycho Love"	Bolan	Slave to the Grind	3:58
7.	"Monkey Business"		Slave to the Grind	4:19
8.	"Quicksand Jesus"		Slave to the Grind	5:21
9.	"Slave to the Grind"	Sebastian Bach; Bolan; Sabo	Slave to the Grind	3:31
10.	"Into Another" (remix)		Subhuman Race (1995)	3:59
11.	"Frozen" (demo 1994)		Subhuman Race	5:32
12.	"My Enemy" (remix)	Scotti Hill; Rob Affuso; Bolan	Subhuman Race	3:32
13.	"Breakin' Down" (remix)	Sabo	Subhuman Race	4:28
14.	"Beat Yourself Blind" (live from The Astoria, London 1995)	Bach; Hill; Bolan; Sabo	Subhuman Beings on Tour (1995)	5:20
15.	"Forever" (previously unreleased, 1988)	Hill; Bolan; Sabo	New track	4:04
16.	"Fire in the Hole" (previously unreleased, 1991)	Hill; Bolan	New track	3:26

Japanese release unlisted bonus track
No.	Title	Writer(s)	{{{extra_column}}}	Length
17.	"Psycho Therapy" (Ramones cover)	Dee Dee Ramone; Johnny Ramone	B-Side Ourselves (1992)	2:30

== Personnel ==
- Sebastian Bach – lead vocals
- Dave Sabo – lead guitar, backing vocals
- Scotti Hill – rhythm guitar, backing vocals
- Rachel Bolan – bass, backing vocals
- Rob Affuso – drums, percussion

== Charts ==
Chart (1998)	Peak position
UK Rock & Metal Albums (Official Charts)	23
