= B-Side Ourselves =

EP by Skid Row
- Released: September 22, 1992
- Recorded: 1992
- Genre: Heavy metal
- Length: 18:33
- Label: Atlantic
- Producer: Jim Mitchell and Skid Row; Bruce Calder, Rachel Bolan, Sebastian Bach ("Delivering the Goods")

Skid Row chronology
Slave to the Grind (1991)	B-Side Ourselves (1992)	Subhuman Race (1995)

Singles from B-Side Ourselves
- 1. "Youth Gone Wild / Delivering the Goods" Released: 1992; 2. "Little Wing" Released: 1992; 3. "C'mon and Love Me" Released: 1993

Professional ratings
Review scores
Source	Rating
AllMusic	3.5/5 stars
Collector's Guide to Heavy Metal	6/10
Rock Hard	8.5/10

B-Side Ourselves is a studio EP by American heavy metal band Skid Row, released on September 22, 1992. It consists of cover versions of songs originally recorded by artists who influenced Skid Row. As the title suggests, most of the tracks had previously featured as B-sides on the band's various singles — "Psycho Therapy" and "Delivering the Goods" appeared on the 1992 re-release of "Youth Gone Wild", "C'mon and Love Me" appeared on both "Slave to the Grind" and "In a Darkened Room", while "What You're Doing" appeared on "Wasted Time"; only the final track, a cover of "Little Wing", was previously unreleased. The EP charted at number 58 on the Billboard 200.

== Release and promotion ==
"Delivering the Goods" is a live recording Phoenix, Arizona on 17 March 1992 and features Judas Priest singer Rob Halford sharing lead vocals with Sebastian Bach. The track was released as a promotional single and was later included on the A Tribute to the Priest album, while a different 1992 live recording - from MTV Studios, again featuring Halford, was released on Skid Row's live EP Subhuman Beings on Tour.

"Psycho Therapy" features a guest appearance from Faster Pussycat's Taime Downe on backing vocals. Music videos were made for "Psycho Therapy" (which features a guest appearance of Joey Ramone from Ramones as an elevator operator) and "Little Wing", the latter of which was also released as a promo single. Both music videos feature on the Skid Row video album No Frills Video.

Live performances of "Psycho Therapy" and "C'mon and Love Me" feature on the Skid Row video album Road Kill. "C'mon and Love Me" was also released as a promo single and featured a rare music video from the band.

== Track listing ==
No.	Title	Writer(s)	Length
1.	"Psycho Therapy" (Ramones cover)	Dee Dee Ramone; Johnny Ramone	2:30
2.	"C'mon and Love Me" (Kiss cover)	Paul Stanley	3:23
3.	"Delivering the Goods" (live; Judas Priest cover)	Rob Halford; K. K. Downing, Glenn Tipton	4:55
4.	"What You're Doing" (Rush cover)	Geddy Lee; Alex Lifeson	4:26
5.	"Little Wing" (The Jimi Hendrix Experience cover)	Jimi Hendrix	3:19
Total length:			18:33

== Personnel ==
=== Skid Row ===
- Sebastian Bach – lead vocals (tracks 2–5)
- Dave Sabo – guitar
- Scotti Hill – guitar
- Rachel Bolan – bass, backing vocals, lead vocals (track 1)
- Rob Affuso – drums, percussion

=== Additional musicians ===
- Taime Downe – backing vocals (track 1)
- Rob Halford – guest vocals (track 3)

== Charts ==
Chart performance for B-Side Ourselves
Chart (1992)	Peak position
Australian Albums (ARIA)	51
Finnish Albums (The Official Finnish Charts)	33
Japanese Albums (Oricon)	15
Swedish Albums (Sverigetopplistan)	48
US Billboard 200	58

== Certifications ==
Certifications for B-Side Ourselves
Region	Certification	Certified units/sales
United States (RIAA)	Gold	500,000^{^}
^{^} Shipments figures based on certification alone.
