= No Frills Video =

Video by Skid Row
- Released: November 2, 1993
- Genre: Heavy metal
- Length: 40 mins
- Label: Atlantic Records

Professional ratings
Review scores
Source	Rating
Allmusic	2.5/5 stars

No Frills Video is a video containing official Skid Row videos originally released on VHS in 1993. The video album features music videos from the Slave to the Grind album and the B-Side Ourselves EP. Running time is 40 minutes.

== Track listing ==
1. "Monkey Business"
2. "In A Darkened Room"
3. "Slave to the Grind"
4. "Quicksand Jesus"
5. "Psycho Therapy" (incorrectly listed as Psychotherapy)
6. "Little Wing"
7. "Wasted Time"
