= Bring 'Em Bach Alive! =

Live album with some studio recordings by Sebastian Bach
- Released: November 2, 1999
- Recorded: 1998 (live show), 1999 (studio tracks)
- Venues: Tokyo, Japan
- Studios: Electric Lady (New York City); WireWorld (Nashville, Tennessee)
- Genres: Heavy metal, hard rock
- Length: 74:31
- Labels: Spitfire (US); Atlantic (Japan)
- Producers: Michael Wagener, Sebastian Bach

Sebastian Bach chronology
The Last Hard Men (1998)	Bring 'Em Bach Alive! (1999)	Bach 2: Basics (2001)

Singles from Bring 'Em Bach Alive!
- 1. "Superjerk, Superstar, Supertears" Released: 1998; 2. "Rock 'N' Roll" Released: 1999

Professional ratings
Review scores
Source	Rating
AllMusic	3/5 stars
Collector's Guide to Heavy Metal	8/10
Metal Hammer	8/10

Bring 'Em Bach Alive! is the debut solo album by heavy metal singer Sebastian Bach released in November 1999, his first after his departure from Skid Row. It is mainly a live album composed of Skid Row songs of Bach's era; it also includes five new studio recordings which are the first five tracks on the album including the single "Superjerk, Superstar, Supertears" and the promo single "Rock 'N' Roll".

== Overview ==
The album charted at number 95 in Japan and sold in the US with a sale figure of 16,979+.

The song "The Most Powerful Man in the World" was originally released on the 1998 album The Last Hard Men from the band of the same name, which was formed and fronted by Bach after he left Skid Row in 1996.

== Track listings ==
No.	Title	Writer(s)	Length
1.	"Rock 'N' Roll" (new studio track)	Sebastian Bach, Wolf Hoffmann	5:52
2.	"Done Bleeding" (new studio track)	Bach, Larry Fisher, Richie Scarlet	5:07
3.	"Superjerk, Superstar, Supertears" (new studio track)	Jimmy Flemion	2:38
4.	"Blasphemer" (new studio track)	Flemion	2:26
5.	"Counterpunch" (new studio track)	Bach, Fisher	3:55
6.	"Slave to the Grind" (live)	Bach, Rachel Bolan, Dave "the Snake" Sabo	3:10
7.	"Frozen" (live)	Bolan, Sabo	7:00
8.	"18 and Life" (live)	Bolan, Sabo	5:10
9.	"Beat Yourself Blind" (live)	Bach, Bolan, Scotti Hill, Sabo	5:23
10.	"Riot Act" (live)	Bolan, Sabo	1:58
11.	"Mudkicker" (live)	Bach, Bolan, Sabo	4:04
12.	"In a Darkened Room" (live)	Bach, Bolan, Sabo	5:07
13.	"Monkey Business / Godzilla" (live; "Godzilla" is a Blue Öyster Cult cover)	Bolan, Sabo / Buck Dharma	9:30
14.	"The Most Powerful Man in the World" (live)	Flemion	2:44
15.	"I Remember You" (live)	Bolan, Sabo	5:59
16.	"Youth Gone Wild" (live)	Bolan, Sabo	4:21

Japanese edition
No.	Title	Writer(s)	Length
1.	"Done Bleeding" (new studio track)		5:02
2.	"Slave to the Grind" (live)		3:13
3.	"Frozen" (live)		6:55
4.	"Here I Am" (live)	Bolan, Sabo	3:26
5.	"18 and Life" (live)		5:22
6.	"Beat Yourself Blind" (live)		5:41
7.	"Blasphemer" (new studio track)		2:28
8.	"Riot Act" (live)		1:58
9.	"Sweet Little Sister" (live)	Bolan, Sabo	2:45
10.	"Mudkicker" (live)		4:56
11.	"In a Darkened Room" (live)		5:12
12.	"Get the Fuck Out" (live)	Bolan, Sabo	3:01
13.	": Monkey Business (Skid Row song); Monkey Business / Godzilla; " (live)		9:56
14.	"The Most Powerful Man in the World" (live)		3:39
15.	"I Remember You" (live)		6:40
16.	"Youth Gone Wild" (live)		4:46
17.	"Superjerk, Supestar, Supertears" (new studio track)		2:38
Total length:			77:38

== Personnel ==
Studio tracks

- Sebastian Bach – vocals
- Wolf Hoffmann – guitar (track 1), background vocals
- Richie Scarlet – guitar (tracks 2, 4, 5), harmonica (track 5), background vocals
- Dave Linsk – guitar (track 2)
- Jimmy Flemion – guitar (tracks 3, 4)
- Larry Fisher – guitar (track 5), bass, background vocals
- Anton Fig – drums

Live band

- Sebastian Bach – vocals
- Richie Scarlet – guitar, background vocals
- Jimmy Flemion – guitar, background vocals
- Larry Fisher – bass
- Mark "Bambam" McConnell – drums

Production

- Michael Wagener – producer, engineering, mixing
- Sebastian Bach – producer
- Todd Goldstein, Mike Nuceder – engineering
- Eric Conn – mastering
- David Bierk – art & design
- Mark Weiss – photography
- Wolf Hoffmann – photography

== Charts ==
Chart (1999)	Peak position
Japanese Albums (Oricon)	95
