= Forever Wild =

Video by Sebastian Bach
- Released: June 15, 2004
- Recorded: 1998
- Genres: Heavy metal, hard rock
- Length: 110:00
- Label: Eagle Vision (US)

Forever Wild is a DVD video of live performances by heavy metal singer Sebastian Bach, released on June 15, 2004. The performances are recorded in Los Angeles, Whisky a Go Go in 1998 and features several Skid Row songs. The DVD features full clips of some of Bach's favorite moments from his stint as host of VH1's Forever Wild TV show.

== Content ==
The DVD also features the music video for the song "Sleep" which was released on the 1998 album The Last Hard Men from the band of the same name which was formed and fronted by Bach after he left Skid Row in 1996. Also featuring from "The Last Hard Men" album is the track "The Most Powerful Man in the World".

Most of the live performances also feature on Bach's debut live solo album Bring 'Em Bach Alive!, including his original song "Blasphemer".

The concert also offers guest appearances from Vince Neil and Ted Nugent.

Professional ratings
Review scores
Source	Rating
AllMusic	2.5/5 stars

== Track listing ==
1. "Sleep"
2. "Slave to the Grind"
3. "Piece of Me"
4. "Frozen"
5. "Bach in the Basement"
6. "Here I Am"
7. "Mic Technique"
8. "Parasite" (Ace Frehley)
9. "18 and Life"
10. "Hangin' with Ted Nugent"
11. "Blasphemer"
12. "Riot Act"
13. "Sweet Little Sister"
14. "Race Car Driving with Vince Neil"
15. "In a Darkened Room"
16. "Monkey Business"
17. "Bach Fu"
18. "The Most Powerful Man in the World"
19. "I Remember You"
20. "Eternal Life"
21. "Youth Gone Wild"
22. "Golf Cart Madness"
