= Subhuman Beings on Tour =

Subhuman Beings on Tour!!

EP live by Skid Row
- Released: July 25, 1995
- Recorded: 1995 (except "Delivering the Goods" in 1992)
- Venue: The Astoria, London, UK (except "Delivering the Goods")
- Genre: Heavy metal
- Length: 29:28
- Label: East West Japan/Atlantic
- Producer: Skid Row

Skid Row chronology
Subhuman Race (1995)	Subhuman Beings on Tour!! (1995)	40 Seasons: The Best of Skid Row (1998)

Subhuman Beings on Tour!! is a live EP by American heavy metal band Skid Row. The EP was released in Japan in 1995 and consists of live performances from the Subhuman Race tour in support of their most recent album Subhuman Race.

== Background ==
Some of the tracks on the EP were released as B-sides on the "Breakin' Down" single in some territories. The live performance of "Beat Yourself Blind" would go on to appear again on the compilation album 40 Seasons: The Best of Skid Row.

The EP features a guest appearance by Judas Priest frontman Rob Halford on "Delivering The Goods" (a Judas Priest cover). A different recording, also featuring Halford, was previously featured on the band's preceding EP B-Side Ourselves, from which it was released as a promo single, as well as the A Tribute to the Priest album.

== Track listing ==
No.	Title	Writer(s)	Length
1.	"Slave to the Grind"	Sebastian Bach; Rachel Bolan; Dave "The Snake" Sabo	4:05
2.	"Delivering the Goods" (Judas Priest cover)	K. K. Downing; Rob Halford; Glenn Tipton	3:57
3.	"Beat Yourself Blind"	Bach; Bolan; Scotti Hill; Sabo	5:24
4.	"Psycho Therapy" (Ramones cover)	Dee Dee Ramone; Johnny Ramone	2:41
5.	"Riot Act"	Bolan; Sabo	2:26
6.	"Monkey Business"	Bolan; Sabo	8:42
7.	"Thanks from the Band"		2:07
Total length:			29:28

== Personnel ==
- Sebastian Bach – lead vocals
- Dave "The Snake" Sabo – guitar, backing vocals
- Scotti Hill – guitar, backing vocals
- Rachel Bolan – bass, backing vocals
- Rob Affuso – drums

Additional musicians

- Rob Halford – guest vocals on "Delivering the Goods"

Production

- Simon Efemey – engineering
- Bruce Calder – mixing
