= Lisa Rose Myers =

Lisa Rose Myers is a Port Severn and Toronto-based artist. Myers is of Anishinaabe ancestry, and has background growing up on a farm and working as a cook, all of which has influenced her artwork. Myers is known for her work with storytelling, indigenous culture, hospitality, mapping, and kinesthetic experience.

== Biography ==
"There are so many ways to begin. So I will start by saying that my name is Lisa Myers. I grew up on a farm in Milton. My mother was born in Shawanaga First Nation. If she were alive today, she'd be a band member at Christian Island, otherwise known as Beausoleil First Nations, otherwise known as Chimnissing. My dad's family settled in Oakville, and he is Austrian and English. That's one way to start." —Lisa Myers, Artist Talk at Onsite Gallery

In her own words, Lisa Myers is an independent curator and artist with a keen interest in interdisciplinary collaboration. Myers has a Master of Fine Arts in Criticism and Curatorial practice from OCAD University. Her recent work involves printmaking, stop-motion animation and performance art... Since 2010 she has worked with natural mediums like anthocyanin pigment from blueberries in printmaking, and stop-motion animation. Her participatory performances involve sharing berries and other food items in social gatherings reflecting on the value found in place and displacement; straining and absorbing. She has exhibited her work in solo and group exhibitions in venues including Urban Shaman (Winnipeg), Art Gallery of Peterborough and the Art Gallery of Ontario. Her writing has been published in a number of exhibition publications in addition to the journal Senses and Society, C Magazine and FUSE Magazine. She is currently an Assistant Professor in the Faculty of Environmental and Urban Change (formerly Faculty of Environmental Studies) at York University. Myers is a member of Beausoleil First Nation and she is based in Port Severn and Toronto, Ontario.

== Education and career ==
Myers is an assistant professor at York University.

Between 1992 and 2011, Myers received education from OCAD University, and Stratford Chefs School.

== Practices ==
Indigenous Canadian contemporary artist Lisa Myers often draws on her family histories in creating her artwork. The artworks all come together, intertwining to represent a fully fleshed out image of stories told to Myers by her Anishinaabe grandfather about his 250 km journey, which he took on foot, escaping a residential school in order to return home. Her work speaks to the generational traumas caused by the Canadian residential school system, honing in on her grandfather's journey as the primary source of inspiration, and expanding upon details of his journey, such as the fact that he sustained himself on wild blueberries during the long walk, in order to create a large, intertwining narrative through a series of many works. About her own work and the methods she uses, Myers states, "I consider walking and cooking as research methods for art making. Using video, super eight film, photographs, sound, and writing as documentation sources, I delve into stories and experiment with ways to retell or re-construct narratives in sculptural and installation form. I use a range of media and materials in my artwork including printmaking, sewn structures and surfaces often involving video projections, audio and the assemblage of materials such as food, seeds, canvas and beads. The tactile nature of working with these materials is similar to the creative process of cooking. Each ingredient has a story and its origin or cultivation contributes to the meal, as do the materials that I bring together in my artwork. The emphasis on food and place resonate through much of my work and reifies the stories and meaning embedded and imbued on these elements."

== Works ==
Myers has contributed writing to the OCAD university project "Walking With Artists", a small collection of reflections on walking practices by Canadian artists. She describes an 11-day walk she took following the path of her maternal grandfather's journey escaping his boarding school. In this walk Myers' grandfather survived on wild blueberries and reconnected with his indigenous heritage. This walk serves as the foundation for an ongoing series of works using blueberry pigments, titled Blueprints for a Long Walk.

One segment of Blueprints for a Long Walk, Blueprints (2012–15) is a set of four serigraphs, using blueberry ink, depicting a map of the area covered in Myers' walk. The first three prints represent the land, the water, and the train tracks individually, and the fourth depicts all three layers together.

Blueprints for a Long Walk also includes several works involving wood spoons. Two video artworks are featured on MAP Magazine: stop motion animation And From Then On we Lived on Blueberries for About a Week (2013), and Blueberry Spoons (2010). Additionally, in her exhibition Where a Heart Started at the Art Gallery of Ontario, Myers invited visitors to eat provided berries using small wood spoons, staining each spoon in the process. Myers used these resulting stained spoons in future works.

Lisa Myers draws inspiration from the stories of her ancestors as well as her maternal grandfather, Vance Essuance. In several works, she visits places which once belonged to her ancestors, such as Beausoleil Island in Georgian Bay. Through the works Here (2009) and Walking (2009) Myers retraces the steps of her ancestors, connecting to the settler histories of Canada with narratives about indigenatity and trauma and resilience.. Myers also uses her work to connect to the stories she was told by her grandfather, about the Canadian residential school system and his journey home after escaping a residential school. Along the Tracks (2011, work in progress) is a one minute, thirty two second video which draws on Myers journey following the 250 km route her grandfather took, on foot, in order to return home from a residential school. The video opens with a black screen, which these captions flash across; 250 km / following the route of their grandfather / three people walk from Shingwauk to Espanola / from a residential school in the direction of home. The journey and subsequent video draws on Myer's recorded conversations with her grandfather in which he relayed his journey home from a Residential School in Sault Ste. Marie. Myers listened to the recording, which was taken in the 90's several times before making the decision to travel the route herself in 2009, alongside her cousin Shelley and her nephew Gabriel. The journey took 11 days, and Myers states that it was a manner of placing herself within her grandfather's journey, his story, and her family's histories.

Myers repeatedly utilises materials such as blueberries or strawberries, cooked, strained then shared with others, to create pigments which she then uses as paint materials. Myers uses wooden spoons in her berry works, noting the ways in which the juices from the fruits stain the wooden spoons. Myers has mentioned that these stains denote the relationships between memories and food, and the manners in which certain foods can connect us to specific memories or ancestral stories. In her series Blueprints, Myers shifted her means of documenting her grandfather's journal from literal to metaphorical in a series of works in which she used ink made from the juice of blueberries, and stained a series of papers, creating maps. The series is made up of four prints, one depicting each aspect of the journey; land, water, and train tracks, and a fourth print in which all three components layer together and create a fully fleshed out map. Myers subverts the conventions of Western cartography, reflecting on the manners in which maps were used to separate land and promote the idea of land ownership and the creation of borders which pushed Indigenous peoples off of the land now referred to as Canada. Myers shifts the focus away from these conventions, and instead uses mapping as a means for storytelling, highlighting her grandfather's journey and the challenges he faced as a young Indigenous man in Canada. Following Blueprints, Myer's created another series which utilises blueberries as a means of storytelling and connecting with Essuance's journey, taking it a step further and expanding her ideas to include Indigenous peoples collective struggles, traumas, and histories. This collection, entitled Straining and Absorbing (2015) follows Myers' processes of cooking and straining blueberries until they are the correct pigmentation and texture for creating art.

Myers describes this process to Maya Wilson-Sanchez, describing the manner in which "The necessary processes required to make blueberries into a liquid involves separating, refining, and isolating certain parts of the fruit to only those that are useful. Myers explains, "I cook and from those berries I am able to make the colour I need. The colour fades after a time, but after boiling and straining, the consistency is smooth, uncomplicated and desirable. ..." Maya Wilson-Sanchez observes the process of Straining and Absorbing as a metaphor which asks "... what parts of history have been discarded? Which stories have been deemed not useful? Whose bodies and beliefs have gone through a process of separation, isolation, and refinement? This process calls to mind what is left behind when everything that is not deemed valuable to a certain process is thrown away."

Straining and Absorbing was part of Myers' work while she was the Art Gallery of Ontario's Artist in Residence in 2015. In an interview, Myers reflects on her use of berries, as well as her decisions to co-create with the individuals who eat the strained berries and then add their stained wooden spoon to the collection. "After people eat the blueberries with wooden spoons that absorb the juice, the spoons will be stained, so I'll collect those and use them in the animation. There will be a trace of somebody consuming something. The idea is that stories are absorbed, as well as food, and that the things we learn, the things we witness, make us who we are. They enable us to locate ourselves in society and in our culture." Myers works come together to create a larger narrative, in which each work represents a specific experience or meaning, and plays its own role in Myers' personal emotions, connections, and family histories. Her work continuously subverts 'traditional' means of creating art, as well as traditional means of storytelling.

Shore Lunch (2014-ongoing) is an ongoing performance art project in which Myers sets up a camp type kitchen at the shore of a great lake or other iconic Canadian waterfront. Inspired by stories told to Myers in which her own mother would catch a fish and then pull off to a shore and cook it over a fire, Myers seeks to recreate that same sense of community. Myers states that Shore Lunch is "Inspired by stories of my Mother's fishing skills and her love for pulling up on an island and frying up fish over a fire, I created this project to think more about the layers of history, the interaction of waterfront leisure areas and industrial hubs around the Great Lakes. This project also seeks to create spaces of sustenance." Shore Lunch has engaged the public on the shores of the Rideau Canal in Ottawa, next to Lake Ontario in Toronto, on the island of Montreal and also hammered down tent pegs in Clarkson, Ontario.

== Curatorial projects ==
In addition to having her own work featured in several exhibitions, Myers has curated exhibitions at art galleries and institutions across Canada. One of these exhibitions took place at the Kitchener Waterloo Art Gallery in 2017, entitled "Carry Forward". Myers' website states that this exhibition "presents documentary films that carry forward and reveal concealed Indigenous and Black histories. Each film has a sense of personal stakes the artist/filmmaker, and resonates to current social justice contexts and where living knowledge continues." Curator and artist Lisa Myers chose the analogy of "carrying forward" to describe the act of bringing something to the next generation, an action which she explores throughout her curation. In particular, Myers focuses here on engagements with "authority and authenticity of documents and documentation" through artworks that "reveal the biases and racism of dominant ideologies enshrined in official papers." Myers is also a curator and leader in the Finding Flowers project. Co-led by Anishinaabe artist, curator and educator Lisa Myers and native-bee ecologist Sheila Colla, Finding Flowers' main focus is researching, replanting and caring for the more-than-twenty Medicine and Butterfly Garden artworks created across Canada by the late Mi'kmaw/Beothuk and 2-Spirit artist Mike MacDonald. These are just two of the many exhibitions and projects which Lisa Myers has had a hand in curating and creating.
