= Mark McConnell =

American drummer

- Also known as: Bam-Bam
- Born: Mark McConnell; August 27, 1961
- Died: May 24, 2012 Gainesville, Florida, US
- Genres: Hard rock, heavy metal, Southern rock
- Occupation: Musician
- Instrument: Drums
- Years active: 1986–2012

Mark "Bam-Bam" McConnell (August 27, 1961 – May 24, 2012) was an American rock and heavy metal musician, best known for his role from 1997 to 2005 as drummer with Sebastian Bach, and later with Blackfoot and Southern Rock Allstars.

== Career ==
McConnell started his career with local bands in Florida, including the Luca-Gordon Band in 1987, and Madam X, replacing Roxy Petrucci. The vocalist with Madam X at that time was Canadian singer Sebastian Bach, who left in 1987 to join Skid Row. McConnell left Madam X the following year, and in 1989 he joined Carrera, and then Warp Drive, who released an album, Gimme Gimme the same year.

In 1997, McConnell teamed up again with Sebastian Bach who was released from Skid Row and was now a solo artist. Aside from touring together for eight years, McConnell featured on Bach's first post-Skid Row album release, Bring 'Em Bach Alive! in 2001, and the live DVD, Forever Wild in 2004.

In 2006, McConnell joined Southern rock veterans Blackfoot, although he left the following year. He subsequently teamed up with Southern Rock Allstars, originally formed by the first Blackfoot drummer, Jakson "Thunderfoot" Spires. He also played with a large number of other groups, including the Comatones, Cryptonaut, Future Urban Zoo, and Native Sun. He also formed a band called Sledgehammer with guitarist Dave Linsk from Overkill, and played on W.A.S.P.'s European tour.

In late May 2012, McConnell fell ill with liver and kidney failure, which also caused some damage to his brain. He died on May 24, 2012, at age 50. Tributes paid to McConnell included a message from Guns N' Roses guitarist Slash, who wrote on Twitter: "RIP Mark ‘Bam Bam’ McConnell. Tragic loss. My heart goes out to his family, friends & bandmates."

== Discography ==
- Warp Drive – Gimme Gimme (1989)
- Sebastian Bach – Bring 'Em Bach Alive! (2001)
- Sebastian Bach – Forever Wild (2004)
