= Breakin' Down =

1995 single by Skid Row

Single by Skid Row

from the album Subhuman Race
- Released: November 6, 1995
- Length: 4:30
- Label: Atlantic
- Songwriter: Dave Sabo
- Producer: Bob Rock

Skid Row singles chronology
"My Enemy" (1995)	"Breakin' Down" (1995)	"Into Another" (1995)

Alternative cover
- Part 2 of the 2 CD set cover

Alternative cover
- German version cover

"Breakin' Down" is a song by American rock band Skid Row and released as a single from their third album, Subhuman Race, in November 1995. It was written by Dave "the Snake" Sabo.

== Background ==
The song is known for its use in the Christopher Walken film The Prophecy. The song charted at No. 48 on the UK Singles Chart. A music video was filmed for "Breakin' Down", and a remix of the song was included on the bands compilation album, 40 Seasons: The Best of Skid Row.

== Track listings ==
UK 7-inch green vinyl

1. "Breakin' Down" (LP version)
2. "Riot Act" (live)

UK CD1 (Part 1 of a 2 CD set)

1. "Breakin' Down" (LP version)
2. "Firesign" (demo)
3. "Slave to the Grind" (live)
4. "Monkey Business" (live)

UK CD2 (Part 2 of a 2 CD set)

1. "Breakin' Down" (LP version)
2. "Frozen" (demo)
3. "Beat Yourself Blind" (live)
4. "Psycho Therapy" (live) (originally performed by the Ramones)

Germany CD

1. "Breakin' Down" (LP version)
2. "Firesign" (demo)
3. "Frozen" (demo)

US CD

1. "Breakin' Down”
2. "Monkey Business" (live)
3. "Slave to the Grind" (live)

== Charts ==
Chart (1995)	Peak position
UK Singles (OCC)	48
UK Rock Chart	3
