= ECT (TV programme) =

- Also known as: Extra Celestial Transmission
- Presented by: Annie Russell
- Country of origin: United Kingdom
- Original language: English
- No. of seasons: 1
- No. of episodes: 10

Production
- Production location: Wembley Studios
- Running time: 30-40 minutes
- Production company: Keefco

Original release
- Network: Channel 4
- Release: 12 April – 14 June 1985

ECT (Extra Celestial Transmission) is a British television music programme dedicated to hard rock and metal music genres.

Ten episodes were broadcast on Channel 4 from 12 April 1985 – 14 June 1985. It aired on Friday evenings (17:30–18:10) as part of Channel 4's "Friday Zone" that also included Paintbox (18:10–18:20) and Soul Train (18:20–19:00).

It preceded two other UK TV programmes aimed at fans of hard rock and heavy metal: Power Hour (1988–1990) and Raw Power (1990–1993).

== Recording ==
The shows were recorded at Wembley Studios and produced by Keith McMillan's Keefco production company. The series producer was Annie Russell.

== Format ==
Each artist played two or three songs live. In addition to the live bands, the show had its own dance troupe, Beauxartz, choreographed by Kevan Allen.

== Episodes ==
The episodes were:

Episode No.	Original Air Date	Artist	Songs
1	12 April 1985	Motörhead	Nothin' Up My Sleeve; Bomber; Mean Machine
1	12 April 1985	The Lords of the New Church	Russian Roulette; Method to My Madness
1	12 April 1985	Magnum	How Far Jerusalem; Just Like an Arrow
1	12 April 1985	Madam X	High in High School; Come One, Come All
2	19 April 1985	Tormé	Star; Here I Go
2	19 April 1985	Rogue Male	Dressed Incognito; Crazy Motor Cycle
2	19 April 1985	Girlschool	Running Wild; I Want You Back
2	19 April 1985	Waysted	Rolling Out the Dice; Heaven Tonight
3	26 April 1985	Shy	Keep the Fires Burning; Hold on to Your Love
3	26 April 1985	Tobruk	Breakdown; Falling
3	26 April 1985	Warrior	Fighting for the Earth; Defenders of Creation
3	26 April 1985	Hawkwind	The Right Stuff; Angels of Death
4	3 May 1985	Tygers Of Pan Tang	The Wreck-Age; Desert of No Love
4	3 May 1985	Mama's Boys	Needle in the Groove; Power and Passion
4	3 May 1985	Robin George	Heartline; Don't Turn Away
4	3 May 1985	McCoy	Freemind; Ride the Night
5	10 May 1985	Marino The Band (featuring Lisa Dominique)	Bad Situation; Suzie Don't Rock 'n' Roll
5	10 May 1985	Wildfire	Jerusalem; Natural Selection
5	10 May 1985	Spider	Gimme Gimme It All; Here We Go Rock 'n' Roll
5	10 May 1985	Gary Moore & Phil Lynott	Out in the Fields; Military Man
6	17 May 1985	Pet Hate	Wreck the Radio; Girls Grow Up too Fast
6	17 May 1985	Tarazara	Behind the Mask; Fantasy
6	17 May 1985	Chariot	When the Moon Shines; Vigilante
6	17 May 1985	Snowy White	Bird of Paradise; Land of Freedom
7	24 May 1985	Cannes	Love's Gone; Liar
7	24 May 1985	Lionheart	Hot Tonight; Heartbeat Radio
7	24 May 1985	The Grip	We Don't Want It; Bet You're Gonna Lose Her; Great Balls of Fire
7	24 May 1985	Persian Risk	Woman and Rock; Rise Up; Too Different
8	31 May 1985	The Gunslingers	Shake Some Action; Never a Dull Moment
8	31 May 1985	The Torpedoes	Foolin' Around; Hold Back the Tears
8	31 May 1985	Venom	Too Loud (For the Crowd); Nightmare; Die Hard
8	31 May 1985	Lee Aaron	Hot to Be Rocked; Shake It Up; Line of Fire
9	7 June 1985	Dumpy's Rusty Nuts	Boxhill or Bust; Hot Lover
9	7 June 1985	Doctor and the Medics	Mole Catcher; Silver Machine
9	7 June 1985	Rock Goddess	Satisfied then Crucified; Heaven; Love is a Bitch
9	7 June 1985	Heavy Pettin'	Rock ain't Dead; Sole Survivor; Love Times Love
10	14 June 1985	She	Love Every Day; Never Surrender
10	14 June 1985	Trash	Boogie Woogie Man; Rock Me... Rock You!
10	14 June 1985	Magnum	On a Storyteller's Night; Les Morts Dansant
10	14 June 1985	Warlock	Hellbound; Out of Control; All Night
