= The Last Hard Men =

The Last Hard Men may refer to:

- The Last Hard Men (film), a 1976 film
- The Last Hard Men (band), a band from the 1990s
