= The Last Hard Men (band) =

American rock music supergroup

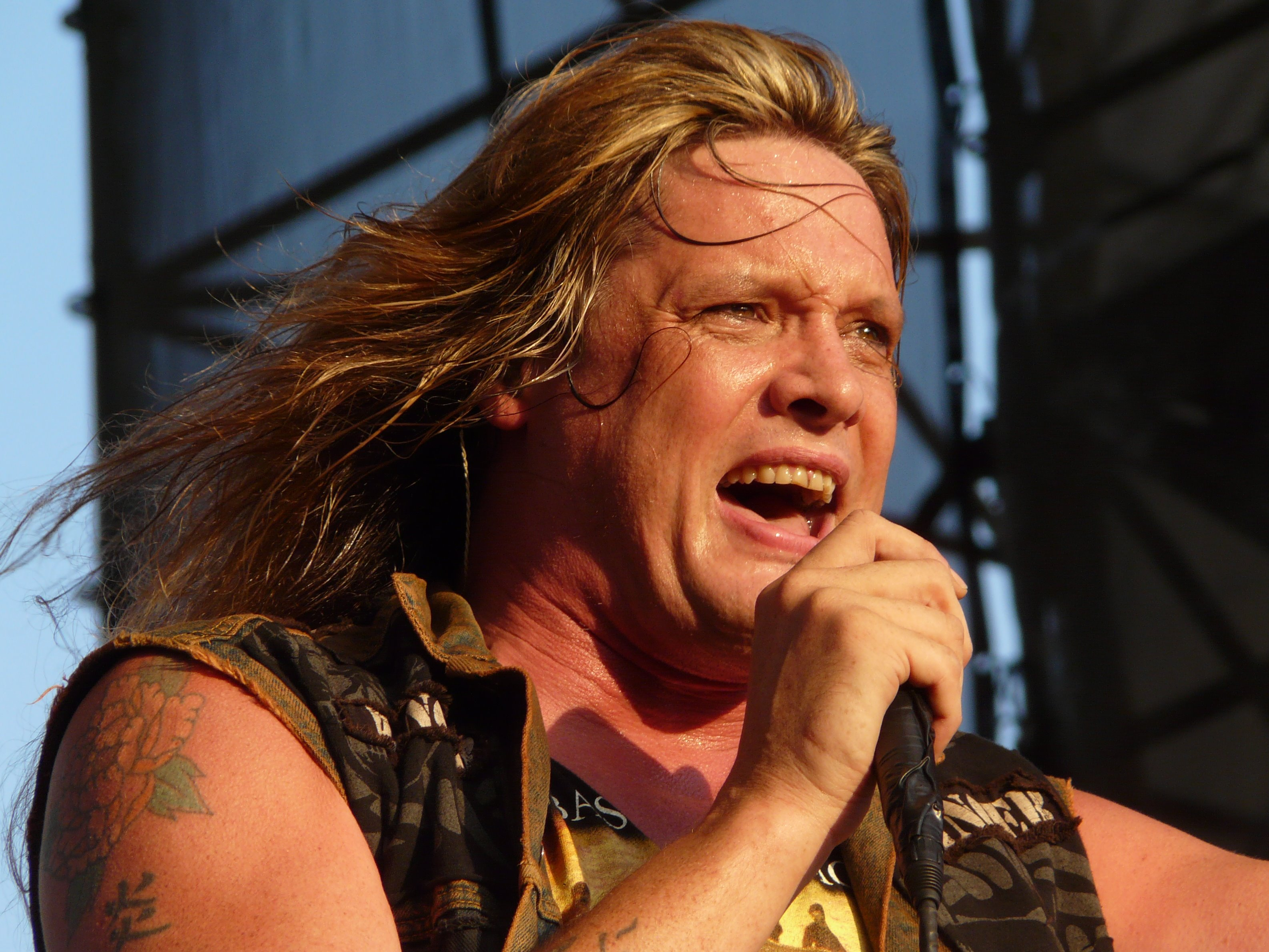
Sebastian Bach at the Moondance Jam on July 11, 2008 in Walker, Minnesota

The Last Hard Men were an alternative music supergroup composed of former Skid Row vocalist Sebastian Bach, The Frogs guitarist Jimmy Flemion, The Breeders guitarist–vocalist Kelley Deal, and The Smashing Pumpkins drummer Jimmy Chamberlin.

== Formation ==
Kelley Deal spoke about the formation of the band in a November 13, 1996, interview with the online magazine Addicted to Noise. She stated that she had read an article in Spin magazine about hair metal bands and was bothered by its derogatory tone especially concerning style, "I saw this article in Spin magazine about hair bands and I was really bothered by it. I mean, here they were making fun of these bands [and their style of clothes], but what were the interviewers wearing? Grunge flannel? Baggy pants? I was bothered that Spin made fun of style because everything is style and it was done in a really mean way. Don't get me wrong, I'm not a huge metal fan either. I mean I like Sabbath, but glam metal was so pussy. It just didn't seem fair."

Deal had previously heard that Sebastian Bach had a good voice and felt he "was the realest of the hair band squealers". She had a friend see if Bach could be reached to consider doing a project. A few weeks later Bach (recently broken up with the band Skid Row) called her up and agreed to discuss the idea. Soon after he met Deal backstage after one of her Kelley Deal 6000 shows in New York.

It was agreed that they would do a cover of Alice Cooper's "School's Out" for the soundtrack of Wes Craven's movie Scream. Deal told the interviewer "We knew they wanted someone to do that song for the movie, so I thought 'who else could I get to do this?' See, my idea was always to have a band with two heavy metal guys and two others. I wanted Jimmy (Flemion) and Sebastian was supposed to bring Tommy Lee, but that didn't happen. Sebastian said it was too bad we couldn't get Jimmy (Chamberlin), but that he didn't think he'd do it. But I did my thing and called Jimmy up and asked him to do it. He said sure."

Deal, Bach, Flemion, and Chamberlin met in the fall of 1996 at Pachyderm Studio in Minnesota. With Deal as producer they were set to record the cover "with Bach singing and playing theremin and percussion, Deal and Flemion singing and playing bass and guitar and Chamberlin handling drums, percussion and some vocals." Deal recalled that "once everybody got there, I extended the studio time and we knew we wanted to record more material." They completed twelve tracks in four days. As "If You Want a Rock, Go To the Quarry" was a Deal favorite by Flemion (from his band The Frogs) that was included, as well as a cover of the hard rock band Scorpions "In search of the peace of mind", and "I Enjoy Being a Girl" by Rodgers and Hammerstein "done in a 'Peggy Lee style.'" The other songs were written by Deal and Flemion. The name of the band was suggested by Deal.

At the time of the interview Deal planned to have the album to come out on her own Nice Records label "with distribution via a bigger label. She also stated "I don't know if it's a one-off. And I don't know if we'll tour, although Sebastian is already drawing up pyro plans for the shows, but I don't think it's odd at all. I think this is normal, it's the thing everybody should be doing."

In addition to their own album members of the band contributed "TNT" and "Little Lover" to Thunderbolt--A Tribute to AC/DC. Members of the band also appeared in Robert D. Tucker's film Final Rinse playing the song "Sleep" at a glam metal concert after being introduced by Joey Ramone.

In 1997 Bach took Flemion with him on a solo tour (along with Richie Scarlet, Mark McConnell, and "Larry") playing some of the songs off The Last Hard Men album along with Skid Row songs and new material. They toured for two weeks of international dates with 100 gigs including Japan, Korea, and Canada and two weeks in the USA. At the time MTV news said the Last Hard Men were waiting for confirmation on a record deal. Saying "Metal Edge Editor Gerri Miller reports that the contract is most likely to be will either Atlantic or a Nasty Man, Deal's own sub-label." In the end the album did not get distribution by a larger label nor was a record deal ever offered.

Bach made a solo record released on December 7, 1999, entitled Bring 'Em Bach Alive!, which Billboard Magazine reported was an idea stemming from his experience in "The Last Hard Men" as "The experience renewed Bach's desire to perform again." Bach told the magazine that "I was getting stir-crazy being off the road. Basically, I was inspired by Kelley Deal. She had her own solo band--the Kelly Deal 6000. I said, "Man, I can do that.'"

After all the band members went off to their own separate pursuits, Bach (promoting his new solo album) was asked about the band by a French magazine, he expressed his happiness with the project placing it alongside earlier work he was proud of. He told the interviewer "'The Last Hard Men' was just a project, nothing to do with Bring 'Em Bach Alive!...It was really rock'n roll because we didn't care about the album's production. When I think that some musicians had been staying in studio for weeks, that makes me crazy. When you listen to 'Monkey Business' from Slave to the Grind, the production wasn't really good, but it sounds so heavy."

== Recordings ==
The Last Hard Men

Studio album by The Last Hard Men
- Released: U.S. circa 1998, September 4, 2001 (re-release)
- Recorded: 1996–1997, Pachyderm Studio
- Genre: Alternative rock
- Label: Nice, Spitfire
- Producer: Sebastian Bach

Professional ratings
Review scores
Source	Rating
AllMusic	4.5/5 stars

The group recorded a full-length, self-titled album for Atlantic Records, who then optioned not to release it. In 1998, it was released on Kelley Deal's label, Nice Records, with no fanfare and a very limited pressing of 1,000 CDs, which may have been sold via mail order only. It was rereleased on Spitfire Records in 2001 with slightly different versions of the songs (mostly varying in length) produced by Get Off My Bach Productions. Despite the lateness of its release the album reached number 22 on the Japanese Top 50 Album chart in 2002. The album can currently be purchased from online retailers such as Amazon and iTunes.

The song "Sleep" features a music video. The music video along with a live performance of "The Most Powerful Man in the World" were released on the Sebastian Bach DVD Forever Wild in 2004.

The group appears on the soundtrack to the film Scream, with their cover of "School's Out".

== Track listing ==
=== 1998 version ===
Limited to 1,000 copies.

1. The Last Hard Men
2. Fucked Over Jesus
3. That Very Night
4. Interlude - Sebastian Bach Questions
5. The Most Powerful Man in the World
6. Sleep
7. Baby, I'm King
8. Interlude - Kelley Deal Questions
9. Who Made You Do It
10. "If You Wanna Rock, Go to the Quarry" – 2:31
11. Spider Love
12. I Hate The Way You Walk
13. Interlude - Jimmy Flemion Questions
14. When the Longing Goes Away
15. Candy Comes
16. Play in the Clouds
17. Interlude - Jimmy Chamberlin Questions
18. Satan's in the Manager [sic]
19. Destiny
20. Mail
21. Interlude

The interludes are not listed on the back cover, but are short separate tracks that feature weird Q&A with the band members.

=== 2001 version ===
1. Sebastian Bach Interview
2. Sleep
3. School's Out (Alice Cooper cover)
4. Kelley Deal Interview
5. The Last Hard Men
6. Who Made You Do It?
7. Candy Comes
8. The Most Powerful Man in the World
9. That Very Night
10. Play in the Clouds
11. Satan's in the Manger
12. In Search of the Peace of Mind (Scorpions cover)
13. Fan Mail
14. Jimmy Chamberlin Interview
15. I Enjoy Being a Girl
16. Spider Love
17. When the Longing Goes Away
18. I Hate the Way You Walk
19. Jimmy Flemion Interview
20. If You Want to Rock, Go to the Quarry
21. Baby, I'm King
22. Final Interview
23. Who Made You Do It? (II)

== See also ==
- The Last Hard Men (1976)
