= Road Kill (video) =

Video by Skid Row
- Released: October 16, 1993
- Genre: Heavy metal
- Length: 120 mins
- Label: Atlantic Records

Professional ratings
Review scores
Source	Rating
Allmusic	2.5/5 stars

Road Kill is a VHS video of live performances by Skid Row. It was released on October 16, 1993. The video collects promo clips, backstage footage, amateur videos from friends and fans, and concert highlights from shows in Japan, Brazil, Ireland, Iceland, and the United States.

Road Kill also includes the music video for"Psycho Love" in 3-D and features the cover songs "Psycho Therapy" and "C'mon And Love Me" which were featured on the band's most recent release B-Side Ourselves. Running time is 120 minutes.

== Track listing ==
1. "Psycho Love" (Video in 3-D)
2. "Slave to the Grind"
3. "Monkey Business"
4. "Here I Am"
5. "Big Guns"
6. "18 and Life"
7. "Psycho Therapy"
8. "Piece of Me"
9. "Get the Fuck Out"
10. "C'mon and Love Me"
11. "Midnight/Tornado"
12. "Mudkicker"
13. "Delivering The Goods"
14. "Cold Gin"
15. "Youth Gone Wild"
