= Madam X (band) =

American rock band

- Also known as: Pantagruel (1981); Hell's Belles (1991)
- Origin: Detroit, Michigan, U.S.
- Genres: Glam metal; heavy metal; hard rock
- Years active: 1981–1988; 1991; 2014–present
- Labels: Jet (1984–1985), EMP Label Group
- Members: Maxine Petrucci; Roxy Petrucci; Chris Doliber; Bret Kaiser
- Past members: John Grosjean; John Ward; Mark McConnell; Sebastian Bach; David Rolen; Shawn Duncan; Lenita Erickson; Irene Wohlman

Madam X is an American glam metal band formed in the early 1980s. Originally formed by sisters Maxine and Roxy Petrucci, the band also featured male members John Grosjean, Bret Kaiser and Chris Doliber, and later included future Skid Row vocalist Sebastian Bach. Disbanding in 1988, the group reformed briefly in 1991, and has become active again after reforming for a second time in 2013.

== History ==
Madam X was formed in Detroit, Michigan in 1981, by the Petrucci sisters, who had previously played in an all-female group called Pantagruel. They recruited bassist Chris Doliber and singer John Grosjean, and the band relocated to the East Coast.

In 1982, Grosjean left the band and was replaced by Bret Kaiser and they moved to New York. They were signed to Jet Records by Don Arden and released their debut album We Reserve the Right on October 29, 1984, which was produced by Rick Derringer. A single, "High in High School", was also released, but in the UK only. They also appeared on the British TV music show ECT in 1985.

Kaiser later left the band and was unsuccessfully replaced by British singer John Ward, later in the bands Sabre and Shy. More songs were recorded but remained unreleased as the band were dropped by Jet. Ward then left in summer 1986 and was replaced by unknown Canadian vocalist Sebastian Bach. Roxy Petrucci also was left in July 1987, and joining Vixen, and was replaced by Mark "Bam-Bam" McConnell. Despite touring with a flamboyant stage show, Bach left on June 12, 1987 to join Skid Row, and in 1988 McConnell left to join the band Carrera. Madam X recruited David Rolen in June 1987 and Shawn Duncan in early 1988, but when Doliber left on July 29 to form his own band Madam X disbanded.

In May 1991, the Petrucci sisters reformed Madam X with singer Lenita Erickson; this line-up was later renamed Hell's Belles with Irene Wohlman on bass, but soon disbanded.

Roxy Petrucci later reformed Vixen, being joined by Maxine on bass for a tour during 1998, only to leave Roxy's band thereafter. Vixen subsequently had to split following that tour when Roxy's previous bandmate Jan Kuehnemund filed a lawsuit to keep the rights to the Vixen name. After leaving Madam X, Bret Kaiser formed his own band (Kaiser) with his brother, and later performed with his own band ('56), releasing an album titled Steppin. Kaiser also performs as an Elvis Presley tribute artist. McConnell died on May 24, 2012.

The four original members, Bret Kaiser, Maxine Petrucci, Roxy Petrucci and Chris "Godzilla" Doliber, reunited at the Sweden Rock Festival on June 7, 2014.

In August 2017 EMP Label Group, a record label formed by David Ellefson of Megadeth, signed the original-member line-up of Madam X and their new album Monstrocity was released on October 31, 2017, as CD and April 20, 2018, as LP.

== Discography ==
Albums

- We Reserve the Right (1984)
- Monstrocity (2017)

Single

- "High in High School" (1984) (UK only)

Videos

- High in High School (1984)
- We Reserve the Right to Rock (1985)
- Monstrocity (2017)

== Members ==
=== Current members ===
- Maxine Petrucci — guitar, backing vocals (1981–1988, 1991, 2014–present)
- Roxy Petrucci — drums, backing vocals (1981–1986, 1991, 2014–present)
- Bret Kaiser — lead vocals (1982–1985, 2014–present)
- Chris «Godzilla» Doliber — bass guitar, backing vocals (1981–1988, 2014–present)

=== Past members ===
- John "Jayme" Grosjean — lead vocals (1981–1982)
- John Ward — lead vocals (1985–1986)
- Sebastian Bach — lead vocals (1986–1987)
- Mark McConnell — drums (1986–1988; died 2012)
- David Rolen — lead vocals (1987–1988)
- Shawn Duncan — drums (1988)
- Lenita Erickson — lead vocals (1991)
- Irene Wohlman — bass guitar, backing vocals (1991)
