= Excess All Areas (Shy album) =

1987 studio album by Shy

Studio album by Shy
- Released: 1 January 1987
- Studio: Soundpush Studios, Blaricum, Netherlands, Red Bus Studios, London, UK
- Genre: Glam metal, hard rock
- Length: 41:16
- Label: RCA/BMG
- Producer: Neil Kernon

Shy chronology
Brave the Storm (1985)	Excess All Areas (1987)	Misspent Youth (1990)

Singles from Excess All Areas
- 1. "Break Down the Walls" Released: 1987; 2. "Young Heart" Released: 1987; 3. "Just Love Me" Released: 1988

Professional ratings
Review scores
Source	Rating
Collector's Guide to Heavy Metal	4/10

Excess All Areas is the third album by the Birmingham, England band Shy. Recorded in the Netherlands with producer Neil Kernon, the album was published in 1987 on RCA/BMG. The album featured Shy's biggest hit, "Break Down The Walls", co-written with Don Dokken and reached Britain's top 75, with Metal Hammer magazine being appreciative.

== Track listing ==
Side one

1. "Emergency" (Michael Bolton, Duane Hitchings) - 3:35
2. "Can't Fight the Nights" (Michael Jay, Steve Harris, Tony Mills) - 3:59
3. "Young Heart" (Harris, Hitchings, Mills) - 3:55
4. "Just Love Me" (John Parker, Mills) - 3:58
5. "Break Down the Walls" (Don Dokken, Alan Kelly, Neil Kernon, Shy) - 5:04

Side two

6. "Under Fire" (Harris, Mills, Kelly) - 4:14
7. "Devil Woman" (Terry Britten, Christine Holmes) - 3:32 (Cliff Richard cover)
8. "Talk to Me" (Harris, Kelly, Paddy McKenna) - 3:51
9. "When the Love Is Over" (Jay, Harris, Mills) - 4:22
10. "Telephone" (Harris, Kelly) - 4:14

== Personnel ==
Shy

- Tony Mills – vocals
- Steve Harris – guitar
- Roy Stephen Davis – bass
- Alan Kelly – drums
- Paddy McKenna – keyboards

Production

- Neil Kernon - producer, engineer, mixing
- Frank Koppelman, John Smit, Matt Budd - engineers
- John Parker - associate producer on track 4
