= Dorothy Caldwell =

Canadian fibre artist (born 1948)

- Born: 1948 (age 77–78); Bethesda, Maryland, United States
- Education: Tyler School of Art
- Known for: Fibre art
- Awards: Saidye Bronfman Award
- Website: Official website

Dorothy Caldwell (born 1948) is a Canadian fibre artist. Her work consists primarily of abstract textile based wall hangings that utilize techniques such as wax-resist, discharge dyeing, stitching, drawing, and appliqué.

== Biography ==
Caldwell was born in Bethesda, Maryland, US in 1948. She emigrated to Canada in 1972 to live and work in Hastings, Ontario. In 1974, Caldwell co-founded the gallery Conqueror Worm, a wholesale and retail craft outlet, in Hastings, Ontario.

== Career ==
Caldwell studied painting at the Tyler School of Art in Philadelphia and received a B.A. in 1970. She was inspired to start working with textile techniques in her painting practice after seeing the World Crafts Council 1974 exhibition "In Praise of Hands". In 1980 she participated in a fibre-artists interchange at the Banff Centre and made the switch from painting to textile art. Upon receiving a research grant in 2007, she travelled to India to study women’s co-ops and Kantha stitching. Her research has also brought her to Japan, Australia, and the Canadian Arctic.

In 1974, Caldwell was a founding member of the artist-run centre Artspace in Peterborough, Ontario. She has artist files in numerous locations across Canada. Caldwell represented Canada at the World's Fair in Osaka in 1991. She has exhibited across Canada, the United States and Australia and is held in permanent collections by the Museum of Arts and Design Permanent Collection in New York, New York, the Canadian Museum of History, Gatineau, Quebec, and the Canadian Department of Foreign Affairs, Ottawa, Ontario. One notable commission, titled Landstat, was completed in the mid-1980s for the Red Deer Arts and Theatre Building at Red Deer College, Alberta.

In 1997, Caldwell received a research grant to travel around India and study women's co-ops and Kantha stitching. This research led to the exhibition Stitching Women's Live: Sujuni and Khatwa from Bihar, India co-curated with Dr. Skye Morrison.

Caldwell's work can be found in permanent collections including the Museum of Arts and Design in New York, the Canadian Museum of History, the Museum of Fine Arts in Boston, and the Art Gallery of Peterborough in Peterborough. Caldwell is represented by David Kaye Gallery, in Toronto; Mobilia Gallery, in Cambridge, Massachusetts; and Snyderman-Works Galleries, in Philadelphia.

=== Awards and recognition ===
1976 - Hand to Hand National Craft Exhibition Award for batiked fabric

1990 - Saidye Bronfman Award.

1990 - Representative EXPO 90, Osaka, Japan, Ontario Pavilion and recipient of the Saidye Bronfman Award
