= Zac Bierk =

Canadian ice hockey player

- Born: September 17, 1976 (age 49) Peterborough, Ontario, Canada
- Height: 6 ft 4 in (193 cm)
- Weight: 186 lb (84 kg; 13 st 4 lb)
- Position: Goaltender
- Caught: Left
- Played for: Tampa Bay Lightning; Minnesota Wild; Phoenix Coyotes
- NHL draft: 212th overall, 1995; Tampa Bay Lightning
- Playing career: 1997–2004

Zachary Bierk (born September 17, 1976) is a Canadian former professional ice hockey player. He played in 47 NHL games with the Tampa Bay Lightning, Minnesota Wild, and Phoenix Coyotes between 1997 and 2004. He most recently was the goaltending coach with the Ottawa Senators, and is now the Goaltending Advisor for the Senators.

== Junior career ==
Bierk was born in Peterborough, Ontario. He spent four years with the Peterborough Petes of the Ontario Hockey League (OHL) from 1993–94 to 1996–97. In the 1995–96 season, Bierk led the Petes to the Memorial Cup final, where they were defeated by the Granby Prédateurs 4–0 in the final. The following season, Bierk won the OHL goaltender of the year award, the Leo Lalonde trophy as the best over-age player in the league and was named to the OHL All-Star First Team and Canadian Hockey League All-Star Second Team.

== Professional career ==
Bierk was drafted by the Tampa Bay Lightning of the National Hockey League (NHL) in the 1995 NHL entry draft as their ninth-round pick, 212th overall, from the Peterborough Petes, although he originally expected to be drafted in the fourth or fifth round, and left the draft after he had not been selected by the end of the sixth round. His first victory came on March 30, 1998 in only his second career start, a 3–1 win in New York against the Rangers.

On January 8, 2003, while playing for the Phoenix Coyotes Bierk and Chicago Blackhawks goaltender Michael Leighton both earned their first NHL shutouts in a 0–0 tie. It was the first time in league history that two goalies had both earned their first career shutouts in the same game.

His final NHL appearance came on November 9, 2003, in a 2–1 overtime loss to the Mighty Ducks of Anaheim. Bierk finished his career with 47 game appearances, a 9–20–5 record, a 3.18 GAA and a 0.901 save percentage with 1 shutout. Bierk also had one assist and six penalty minutes.

== Post-playing career ==
After retiring, Bierk served as one of the instructors at the goaltending school, Team Shutout. Bierk joined the Oshawa Generals of the OHL in June 2013 as their goalie consultant, replacing Michael Lawrence. Bierk won a Memorial Cup with the Generals in 2015.

Bierk returned to the Coyotes organization in 2018 as the team's goaltending development coach, also serving as the goalie coach of their AHL farm club, the Tucson Roadrunners. On April 6, 2021, Bierk was hired as the goaltending coach for the Ottawa Senators. Bierk had many connections to the Senators prior to joining the organization. He and Senators' head coach D. J. Smith were both coaches with the Generals during their 2015 Memorial Cup win. Furthermore, with the Coyotes Bierk worked under Brian Daccord, the father of then-Senators' goaltender Joey Daccord. In January 2024, Bierk was replaced as goaltending coach by Justin Peters and assigned scouting duties.

Bierk also co-owns and runs a high-level goaltending school in the Greater Toronto Area, known as Armour Goaltending.

== Personal life ==
Bierk is the son of David Bierk, an artist whose paintings are still displayed at the Nancy Hoffman Gallery in New York City. One of eight children, he is the brother of musician and actor Sebastian Bach.

== Career statistics ==
=== Regular season and playoffs ===
			Regular season									Playoffs
Season	Team	League	GP	W	L	T	MIN	GA	SO	GAA	SV%	GP	W	L	MIN	GA	SO	GAA	SV%
1993–94	Peterborough Bees	OPJHL	4	—	—	—	205	17	0	4.98	—	—	—	—	—	—	—	—	—
1993–94	Peterborough Petes	OHL	9	0	4	2	423	37	0	5.22	.870	1	0	0	33	7	0	12.70	—
1994–95	Peterborough Petes	OHL	35	11	15	5	1779	117	0	3.95	—	6	2	3	301	24	0	4.78	—
1995–96	Peterborough Petes	OHL	58	31	16	6	3292	174	2	3.17	.910	22	14	7	1383	83	0	3.60	—
1995–96	Peterborough Petes	M-Cup	—	—	—	—	—	—	—	—	—	5	3	2	303	14	0	2.77	.929
1996–97	Peterborough Petes	OHL	49	28	16	0	2744	151	2	3.30	.916	11	6	5	666	35	0	3.15	—
1997–98	Tampa Bay Lightning	NHL	13	1	4	1	433	30	0	4.16	.857	—	—	—	—	—	—	—	—
1997–98	Adirondack Red Wings	AHL	12	1	6	1	557	36	0	3.87	.891	—	—	—	—	—	—	—	—
1998–99	Tampa Bay Lightning	NHL	1	0	1	0	59	2	0	2.04	.905	—	—	—	—	—	—	—	—
1998–99	Cleveland Lumberjacks	IHL	27	11	12	4	1556	79	0	3.05	.914	—	—	—	—	—	—	—	—
1999–00	Tampa Bay Lightning	NHL	12	4	4	1	509	31	0	3.66	.899	—	—	—	—	—	—	—	—
1999–00	Detroit Vipers	IHL	15	4	8	2	846	46	1	3.26	.914	—	—	—	—	—	—	—	—
2000–01	Minnesota Wild	NHL	1	0	1	0	60	6	0	6.00	.778	—	—	—	—	—	—	—	—
2000–01	Cleveland Lumberjacks	IHL	49	24	18	5	2785	134	6	2.89	.909	4	0	3	182	10	0	3.29	.903
2001–02	Augusta Lynx	ECHL	30	16	9	3	1748	68	1	2.33	.925	—	—	—	—	—	—	—	—
2001–02	Springfield Falcons	AHL	1	0	1	0	20	4	0	12.00	.778	—	—	—	—	—	—	—	—
2002–03	Phoenix Coyotes	NHL	16	4	9	1	884	32	1	2.17	.932	—	—	—	—	—	—	—	—
2002–03	Springfield Falcons	AHL	13	6	4	1	685	33	0	2.89	.915	—	—	—	—	—	—	—	—
2003–04	Phoenix Coyotes	NHL	4	0	1	2	190	12	0	3.79	.889	—	—	—	—	—	—	—	—
2003–04	Springfield Falcons	AHL	2	0	1	1	106	6	0	3.38	.903	—	—	—	—	—	—	—	—
NHL totals			47	9	20	5	2135	113	1	3.18	.901	—	—	—	—	—	—	—	—
