= David Bierk =

American-Canadian painter (1944–2002)

- Born: David Charles Bierk; June 9, 1944; Appleton, Minnesota, U.S.
- Died: August 28, 2002 (aged 58); Peterborough, Ontario, Canada
- Education: California College of Arts & Crafts; Humboldt State University
- Known for: Painter, draftsman
- Spouses: Kathleen Mae Hunter (m. 1967, divorced); Elizabeth Lovett Aimers (m. 1980)
- Children: Sebastian Bach, Zac Bierk, Heather Dylan Bierk

David Charles Bierk RCA (June 9, 1944 – August 28, 2002) was an American-Canadian realist painter known for working in the postmodern genre.

== Early life ==
Born in Appleton, Minnesota, to Glennon Bierk and Doris Ruth Steenson, Bierk moved with his mother to Lafayette, California, following his parents' divorce. Bierk said of his childhood,

"We were plunked into an upper middle class neighbourhood before divorce was common, and she [my mother] not only provided for me but also was my mother, father, teacher and friend. It was my uncle Spiros, though, who taught me – at an early age – what you might call the work ethic. I always worked, at least from the time I was in grade six or seven. Spiros owned a mayonnaise factory in San Francisco and I started working there, doing things like scraping the labels of returned mayonnaise bottles and scraping the mold from cheese – eight hour days in the summers from the time I was 12 or 13."

Bierk graduated from high school in 1962 and joined the National Guard. Initially he studied at California College of Arts & Crafts, Bierk dropped out after a year and half, and as he described it,

"...I took off, hitchhiked across the country, ended up in Florida, and then caught a boat to the Bahamas....I got a job as librarian at...Mary Star of the Sea School, a Catholic grammar school, where I persuaded Sister Mary Alice to let me teach art as well."

Upon his return to California, Bierk was admitted to Humboldt State University where he earned a Bachelor of Arts 1969, and a master of fine arts in 1970. Bierk's sister-in-law lived in Toronto, and in 1971 he emigrated there with his young family.

== Career ==
During the year that he lived in Toronto, Bierk immersed himself in the local cultural scene, which he described as exploratory. Then he moved to Peterborough, Ontario in 1972 to take up a teaching position at Kenner Collegiate Vocational Institute, and later at Fleming College. Along with poet Dennis Tourbin, Bierk founded and directed Artspace between 1974 and 1987, which was one of Canada's earliest artist operated art centers.

Bierk's early painting drew on sources such as diverse as American West Coast Pop and Photo Realism. In Canada, he expanded his West Coast Pop into Canadian images as well as painting a Canadian Rock series, and a multiple fold painting series. In the early 1980s, he began his Repaintings, quoting from famous artists of the past. In a June 2001 Art in America review, critic Jonathan Goodman wrote that

"Bierk quotes from the past not so much to critique current art as to reinterpret a way of seeing that he associates with artists as disparate as Vermeer, Eakins, Ingres, Manet and Fantin-Latour....[Bierk] accomplishes this particularly well when he starkly juxtaposes two or three of his eclectic art-historical references within a single work."

Noting the work's "virtuoso" technical quality, Goodman also observes that Bierk's "marvelously romantic" landscape paintings are, unlike these referential paintings, invented images, rather than appropriated or copied from masterworks. Both Goodman's review and Bierk's 2002 New York Times obituary note that Bierk used framing to call attention, in a way that is pointedly "postmodern", to the historical disjunction between the evoked masterworks and the contemporary cultural environment: "He painted copies of works by artists like Vermeer or the Hudson River School painter Frederic Edwin Church, for example, and framed them within broad steel panels, setting up a tension between humanism and old masterly craft on the one hand, and Modernist abstraction and industrial fabrication on the other."

== Exhibitions ==
His solo shows included exhibitions at Artspace, Peterborough (1976), the Art Gallery of Peterborough (1981–1983), and Museum London (1983). The travelling exhibition After History: The Paintings of David Bierck organized by the Montgomery Museum of Fine Arts, Montgomery, Alabama in 2002 toured in Canada. His group exhibitions were extensive. In 2017, his work was included in the Robert McLaughlin Gallery's show titled Land, Sea and Air.

== Public collections ==
- Art Gallery of Greater Victoria, Victoria, British Columbia
- Art Gallery of Ontario, Toronto
- Art Gallery of Peterborough, Peterborough, Ontario
- Art Gallery of Windsor, Windsor, Ontario
- Boca Raton Museum of Art, Boca Raton, Florida
- City of Peterborough, Ontario
- The Dayton Art Institute, Dayton, Ohio
- Evansville Museum of Arts and Science, Evansville, Indiana
- Montgomery Museum of Fine Arts, Montgomery, Alabama
- Museum London, London, Ontario
- National Gallery of Canada, Ottawa, Ontario
- The Robert McLaughlin Gallery, Oshawa, Ontario
- Tom Thomson Art Gallery Owen Sound, Ontario

== Awards ==
- 1991 Best Album Cover of the Year, RAW Magazine
- member in 1998 of the Royal Canadian Academy of Arts
- posthumously awarded the Queen's Golden Jubilee Medal

== Notable works ==
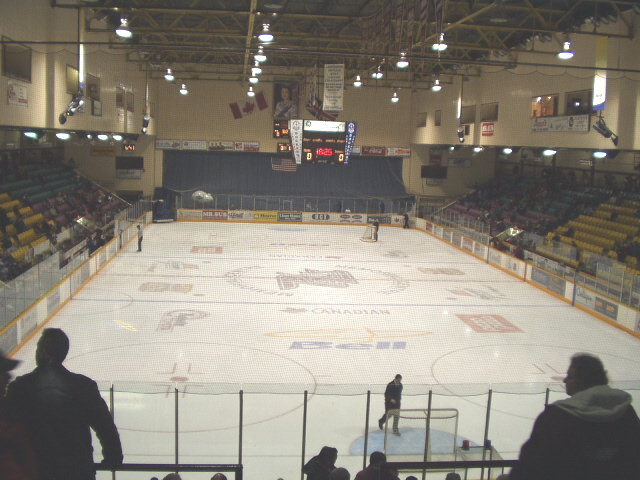
Queen Elizabeth II portrait hanging inside the (pre-renovation) Peterborough Memorial Centre

- Hockey Night in Canada (1975)
- The Laundromat, A Canadian Interior (1975)
- The Cremation of Sam McGee (Canada Post stamp, 1976)
- Locally one of his most famous paintings is his iconic, larger than life portrait of Queen Elizabeth II that overlooked the Peterborough Memorial Centre arena. Completed in 1981 and measuring 3.6m x 2.4m (12' x 8') is believed to be the largest portrait of the Queen in North America.
- Internationally his most widely recognizable work is the 1991 album cover of Skid Row's Slave to the Grind.

== Personal life and death ==
Bierk became a Canadian citizen in 1978. He married Kathleen Mae Hunter in Freeport, Bahamas, in 1967. Following his divorce from Hunter, Bierk married Elizabeth Lovett Aimers at Abercorn, Quebec, in 1980.

Bierk had eight children, including sons Sebastian Bach, former lead singer of the rock group Skid Row, and Zac Bierk, a former professional ice hockey player.

Bierk died in Peterborough, Ontario, in August 2002, aged 58, from pneumonia related to ongoing leukemia.
