= Into Another =

Single by Skid Row

from the album Subhuman Race
- Released: 1995
- Genre: Heavy metal
- Length: 4:02
- Label: Atlantic
- Songwriters: Rachel Bolan, Dave Sabo
- Producer: Bob Rock

Skid Row singles chronology
"Breakin' Down" (1995)	"Into Another" (1995)	"Ghost" (2003)

"Into Another" is a song by Skid Row. It was a single from their third album, Subhuman Race. The song was released in 1995 and written by bandmates Rachel Bolan and Dave "the Snake" Sabo. This is the last single Skid Row released with Sebastian Bach.

== Background ==
"Into Another" features a music video and a remix of the song was included on the band's compilation album, 40 Seasons: The Best of Skid Row.

The song reached #28 on the Mainstream Rock Tracks chart.

== Track listing ==
1. "Into Another" (LP Version)
2. "My Enemy" (LP Version)
3. "Firesign" (Demo Version)

== Charts ==
Chart (1995)	Peak position
US Mainstream Rock (Billboard)	28
