= Art Gallery of Peterborough =

Coordinates: 44°17′41″N 78°19′3.5″W

- Established: 1974
- Location: 250 Crescent Street; Peterborough, Ontario; K9J 2G1
- Type: Art museum
- Website: agp.on.ca

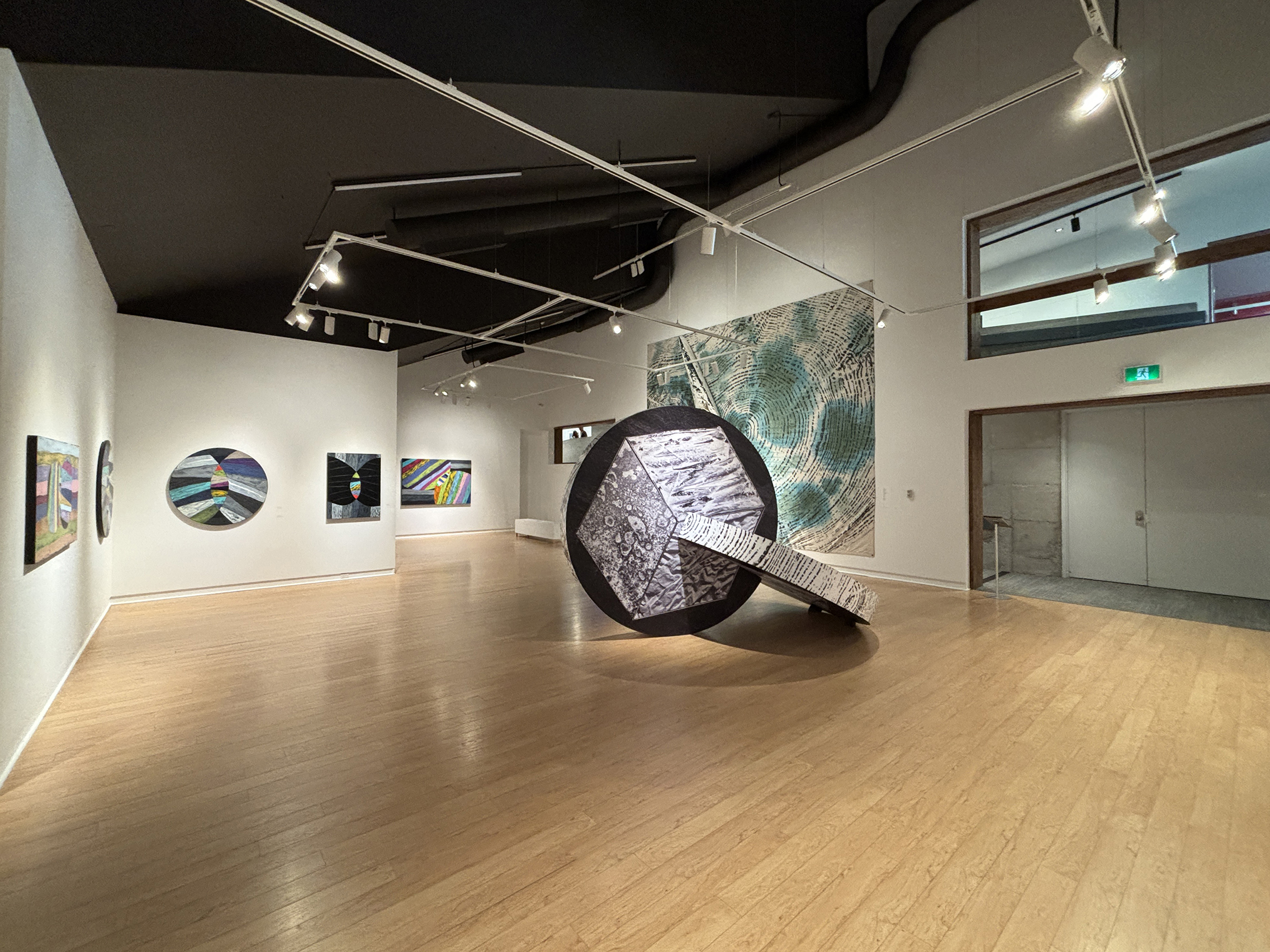
Gallery interior

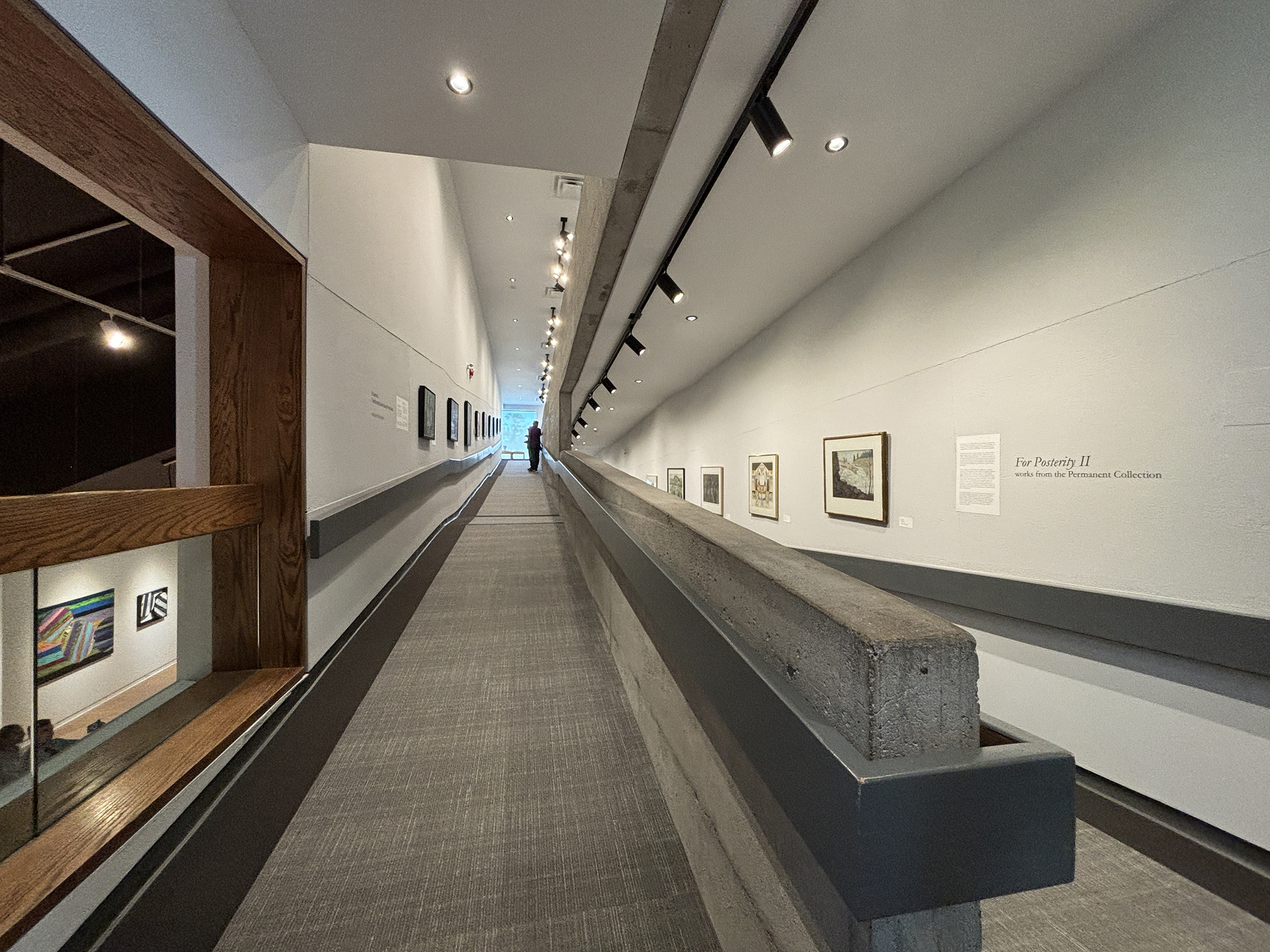
Gallery ramp

The Art Gallery of Peterborough is a free admission, non-profit public art gallery in Peterborough, Ontario, Canada. A registered charity that depends on the support of its members, it was founded in 1974 by an independent board of volunteers. In 1977 it was given the Foster House by the City of Peterborough, a historical residence set in parkland beside Little Lake. In 1979 The gallery expanded to its current size of 11,000 square feet (1,000 m^{2}) with the construction of its modernist wing designed by Crang & Boake architects.

From its incorporation, the AGP operated independently with grants from the Ontario Arts Council, the Canada Council for the Arts, and support from the City of Peterborough. Towards the end of the millennium, faced with increasing economic challenges, the Board initiated a conversation with the City towards organizational stability. In 2000, after negotiations between the AGP Board and the City of Peterborough, City Council invited the AGP to become part of the City’s Arts, Culture and Heritage Division.

The facility is now owned and managed by the City, and AGP employees are employees of the City of Peterborough. The Director of the AGP reports to the Board of Directors as well as the City of Peterborough’s Arts & Culture Division. The AGP Board of Directors remains the institution’s independently elected governing authority responsible for overseeing the mandate, programs, and the permanent collection as well as its not-for-profit incorporation and charitable status.

In addition to its permanent collection and exhibitions, the gallery offers many educational programs for adults and children. There is also a gallery shop featuring a variety of works by local and regional artists and makers.

The permanent collection presently numbers over 1,800 pieces. The acquisition program is funded by private donations and matching grants from the Canada Council. Annual operating and management costs are provided by the Ontario Arts Council, the Canada Council for the Arts, and community fundraising efforts. The Art Gallery of Peterborough is a City of Peterborough facility. The gallery is a member of the Ontario Association of Art Galleries.

Prominent Canadian artists with works in the collection include Carl Beam, Rebecca Belmore, David Bierk, Ron Bloore, Emily Carr, Dorothy Caldwell, A.J. Casson, Paterson Ewen, Ivan Eyre, Gershon Iskowitz, A.Y. Jackson, Rita Letendre, Sanaz Mazinani, Daphne Odjig, Jack Shadbolt, and Bill Vazan.

== Exhibitions ==
The art gallery holds frequent exhibitions, including:

- 2023 Tim Whiten - Elemental: Earthen
- 2020 Jack Bush + Francisco-Fernando Granados - duet
- 2019 Shelley Niro - women, land, river
- 2018 Dr. Roberta Bondar - Light in the Land ~ The Nature of Canada
- 2017 Charles Pachter - Of Moose and Monarchs
- 2017 Brenda Francis Pelkey - A Retrospective
- 2017 Spencer J. Harrison - Not a Freak Show: Growing Up Gay in Rural Ontario
- 2016 Arthur Shilling - The Final Works
- 2016 Bonnie Devine - La Rábida, Soul of Conquest: an Anishinaabe encounter
- 2011 (Summer) Robert Houle - Paris/Ojibwa
- 2010 (Winter) Allyson Mitchell - Ladies Sasquatch
- 2009 (Summer) Nobuo Kubota - Hokusai Revisited
- 2009 (Winter) Mendelson Joe - Joe's Politicians
- 2008 Kawartha Autumn Studio Tour collection
- 2000 Patrick Mahon : palindRome, Lethbridge, Alberta: Southern Alberta Art Gallery, ISBN 1-894699-00-9
- 1996 Bill Vazan : jumpgates, an overview of photoworks, 1981–1995, Peterborough, Ontario: Art Gallery of Peterborough, ISBN 1-896809-00-6
- 1994 In the absence of paradise : the art of David Bierk, Ottawa: Tellem Press, ISBN 1-895286-01-8
- 1993 Tony Urquhart - Dialogues of Reconciliation: The Imagination of Tony Urquhart
- 1992 Nameless, named : paintings and works on paper by Sheila Butler : December 3, 1992 to January 3, 1993., Toronto: Evelyn Aimis Gallery, ISBN 0-9694514-2-3
- 1990 Henry Moore's animals : prints from the permanent collection of the Art Gallery of Ontario, Toronto: Art Gallery of Ontario, ISBN 0-919777-81-3
