= Mary Star of the Sea Church, Freeport =

Coordinates: 26.517428°N 78.689424°W

Mary Star of the Sea Church
- Mary Star of the Sea Church
- Location: Freeport
- Country: Bahamas
- Denomination: Roman Catholic Church

The Mary Star of the Sea Church is a religious building belonging to the Catholic Church and is located in East Sunrise Highway in the city of Freeport the second largest in the Bahamas.

Follow the Roman or Latin rite and depends on the Catholic Archdiocese of Nassau (Archidioecesis Nassaviensis) based in the capital, Nassau, all religious services are conducted in English. This is one of 5 of Catholic churches located on Grand Bahama Island in the northern part of the Bahamas, the others being the Haitian Mission, the Church of St. Agnes, Church of St. Michael and Church of St. Vincent de Paul.

== See also ==
- Catholic Church in the Bahamas
