= Shy (band) =

British hard rock band

- Origin: Birmingham, England
- Genres: Hard rock; AOR; glam metal
- Years active: 1982–present
- Labels: RCA; MCA; Ebony; Z; MTM
- Website: shyonline.co.uk

Shy were a British hard rock band from Birmingham, formed in 1982 under the name Trojan.

== Biography ==
Formerly known as Trojan (not to be confused with NWOBHM band Tröjan who released the album Chasing the Storm), Shy featured vocalist Tony Mills, Steve Harris (guitars; not to be confused with Iron Maiden bassist Steve Harris), Paddy McKenna (keyboards), Mark Badrick (bass) and drummer Alan Kelly. Their first album, called Once Bitten...Twice..., was released in 1983. Initial reports from Kerrang! were positive. After the release, Mills dropped his David Bowie-esque make-up, and Mark Badrick was replaced by former Trouble bassist Roy Davies.

Shy made their major label debut on RCA Records with 1985's Brave the Storm. This release gained success despite the single "Hold On (To Your Love)" being disqualified from the charts, as early copies included a shrink-wrapped T-shirt. Reviews from Kerrang! were more positive, comparing Mill's soaring vocals with those of Geoff Tate, vocalist of Queensrÿche. In the eighteen months that preceded the band's third album, Shy toured with Bon Jovi, Meat Loaf, Twisted Sister, Gary Moore and UFO.

The band's 1987 album, Excess All Areas, was recorded in the Netherlands with producer Neil Kernon. The album featured Shy's biggest hit, "Break Down the Walls", co-written with Don Dokken. The album reached the UK Albums Chart, with Metal Hammer magazine being appreciative. RCA dropped Shy after this album. 1989 saw the release of Misspent Youth on MCA. The album, produced by Roy Thomas Baker, was promoted with American and European tours.

By 1994, Mills had been replaced by vocalist Jon Wardi Ward, previously in NWOBHM band Sabre and US hair band Madam X. The band's 1994 album Welcome to the Madhouse was released in Japan by Phonogram but initially failed to get distribution elsewhere. The band released a live album in 1999, recorded in Europe, and two albums containing previously unreleased songs, Let the Hammer Fall and Regeneration.

Mills returned to the band in 2000. In 2002, Shy recorded and released an album featuring Mills, Unfinished Business which saw Man drummer Bob Richards replacing Kelly.

In 2005, Shy released Sunset and Vine on the MTM Music label. In addition to Mills, Harris and Davis, this album featured Mills' ex-Siam colleague Ian Richardson on rhythm guitar and keyboard player Joe Basketts, who had previously worked with Mills on his solo album.

In 2006, Mills met with Norwegian rock act TNT, and announced he was leaving Shy to take up the vocalist slot, empty since the announced departure of Tony Harnell. Shy supported TNT on their final tour.

Shy originally had planned for Tony O'Hora from Praying Mantis and Andy Scott's Sweet to replace Mills. However, vocalist Lee Small, formerly of Surveillance and the supergroup Phenomena, took the helm for a handful of gigs before parting company with Shy in January 2009, though he rejoined the band soon after. Their latest album, entitled simply Shy, was released in Japan in September 2011 on the Marquee Avalon label, and in Europe in October on Escape Music. Ian Richardson (previously in Siam) has since left Shy but provided some additional rhythm guitar on the latest release.

Steve Harris died of a brain tumour in October 2011. Songs written by Harris have appeared posthumously on albums by the melodic rock band Edge of the Blade.

Tony Mills died from pancreatic cancer on September 18, 2019, aged 57.

== Band members ==
=== Current members ===
- Lee Small – vocals
- Roy Davis – bass
- Joe Basketts – keyboards
- Bob Richards – drums

=== Former members ===
- Tony Mills – vocals (died 2019)
- Ian Richardson – guitars
- Steve Harris – guitar (died 2011)
- Alan Kelly – drums
- Paddy "Pat" McKenna – keyboards
- Mark Badrick – bass
- John "Wardi" Ward

== Discography ==
=== Studio albums ===
- Once Bitten...Twice... (1983)
- Brave the Storm (1985)
- Excess All Areas (1987)
- Misspent Youth (1989)
- Welcome to the Madhouse (1994)
- Regeneration (1999)
- Let the Hammer Fall (1999)
- Unfinished Business (2002)
- Sunset and Vine (2005)
- Shy (2011)

=== Live albums ===
- Live in Europe (1999)

=== Compilation albums ===
- Reflections: The Anthology 1983-2005 (2006)

=== Extended plays ===
- Breakaway (2001)

== See also ==
- List of new wave of British heavy metal bands
