= Wasted Time (Skid Row song) =

1991 single by Skid Row

Single by Skid Row

from the album Slave to the Grind
- Released: November 11, 1991
- Genre: Heavy metal
- Length: 5:49
- Label: Atlantic
- Songwriters: Sebastian Bach; Rachel Bolan; Dave Sabo
- Producer: Michael Wagener

Skid Row singles chronology
| "Slave to the Grind" (1991) | "Wasted Time" (1991) | "In a Darkened Room" (1991) |

"Wasted Time" is a song by Skid Row. It was their third single released from their second album, Slave to the Grind. The song was released in 1991 and written by bandmates Sebastian Bach, Rachel Bolan and Dave "the Snake" Sabo. It became the band's last song to appear on the US Billboard Hot 100 and was promoted with a music video.

== Background ==
Lead singer Sebastian Bach said the song was written about the spiraling effect of drug use on his friend Steven Adler, the original drummer of American hard rock band Guns N' Roses.

The song reached number 88 on the Billboard Hot 100, number 30 on the Mainstream Rock Tracks chart and number 20 on the UK Singles chart. Some versions of the single included the Rush cover "What You're Doing".

== Track listing ==
1. "Wasted Time" (Edit)
2. "Psycho Love"
3. "Get The Fuck Out" (Live)
4. "Holidays in the Sun" (originally performed by Sex Pistols)

== Personnel ==
- Sebastian Bach – vocals
- Dave Sabo – guitars
- Scotti Hill – guitars
- Rachel Bolan – bass
- Rob Affuso – drums

== Charts ==
| Chart (1991–1992) | Peak position |
|---|---|
| UK Singles (OCC) | 20 |
| US Billboard Hot 100 | 88 |
| US Mainstream Rock (Billboard) | 30 |
