= Slave to the Grind =

- Cover art by David Bierk

Studio album by Skid Row
- Released: May 21, 1991: June 7, 1991 (EU) June 18, 1991 (Japan)
- Recorded: October 1990–March 1991
- Studios: New River Studios (Fort Lauderdale, Florida); Scream Studios (Studio City, Los Angeles)
- Genres: Heavy metal; hard rock; glam metal
- Length: 48:41: 64:05 (Japan)
- Label: Atlantic
- Producer: Michael Wagener

Skid Row chronology
Skid Row (1989)	Slave to the Grind (1991)	Subhuman Race (1995)

Singles from Slave to the Grind
- 1. "Monkey Business" Released: June 3, 1991; 2. "Slave to the Grind" Released: September 2, 1991; 3. "Wasted Time" Released: November 11, 1991; 4. "In a Darkened Room" Released: October 1991; 5. "Quicksand Jesus" Released: May 25, 1992 (Japan only)

Slave to the Grind is the second studio album by American heavy metal band Skid Row, released on May 21, 1991, through Atlantic. It displayed a heavier sound than its predecessor Skid Row.

Slave to the Grind is the first heavy metal album to chart at number one on the Billboard 200 in the Nielsen SoundScan era, selling 134,000 copies in its opening week. The album was certified 2× platinum by the Recording Industry Association of America (RIAA) on April 8, 1998, for shipping two million copies in the United States.

The album produced five singles: "Monkey Business", "Slave to the Grind", "Wasted Time", "In a Darkened Room" and "Quicksand Jesus". Skid Row promoted the album opening for Guns N' Roses in 1991 and as a headliner the following year.

== Composition and recording ==
Skid Row wrote most of Slave to the Grind in a New Jersey studio and demoed the tracks with Michael Wagener, who produced their previous album. Recording began between October 1990 to March 1991 and took place at two studios: New River in Fort Lauderdale, Florida and Scream in Studio City, California.

Slave to the Grind marked the band's move toward a heavier sound, with the title track verging on speed metal, but the album also includes power ballads and a few lighter tracks. Some sources still classified the album as glam metal, despite its heavier sound.

The lyrics were more complex, criticizing modern ways of life, authority, politics, drugs, and organized religion, among other topics. Wagener said the demoing and pre-production went well, and the title track was recorded and mixed in an hour, and was placed on the album without being remixed.

During a February 2017 interview for the Backspin segment of Yahoo! Music, vocalist Sebastian Bach revealed that the version of the title track included in the finished album is actually the original demo the band recorded during pre-production with producer Michael Wagener. The band recorded a proper version during the album sessions, but were unable to match the intensity of the demo, and therefore opted to use the former instead.

== Cover art ==
Sebastian Bach's father, David Bierk, painted the cover art, which is actually a long mural, continued inside the album's booklet.

Although it is set in the medieval era, it depicts people using modern technological gadgets. The cover was inspired by Caravaggio's Burial of St. Lucy from 1608 and shows John F. Kennedy in the crowd.

== Release and promotion ==
When recording finished, Skid Row opened for Guns N' Roses on the 1991 North American leg of their Use Your Illusion Tour.

In 1992, Skid Row took Pantera and Soundgarden as supporting bands on its Slave to the Grind Tour.

Two different versions of the album were released: the original and a "clean" version, in which "Get the Fuck Out" is replaced with the less-offensive "Beggar's Day".

Music videos were produced for all five singles: "Monkey Business", "Slave to the Grind", "Wasted Time", "In a Darkened Room" and "Quicksand Jesus", all of which feature on the video album No Frills Video. Skid Row's label Atlantic Records was not supportive of the group's transformation when filming the video for the title track.

The label wanted a bikini model to star in the video, but the idea was turned down by the band because the song was not about female sexuality. A music video was also made for "Psycho Love" in 3D which featured on the video album Road Kill.

== Critical reception ==
Professional ratings
Review scores
Source	Rating
AllMusic	4.5/5 stars
Kerrang!	4/5 stars
NME	1/10
Entertainment Weekly	A−
Chicago Tribune	3.5/4 stars
Spin	favourable
Rolling Stone	3/5 stars
Christgau's Consumer Guide	(dud)
Collector's Guide to Heavy Metal	9/10
Encyclopedia of Popular Music	3/5 stars

Slave to the Grind debuted at number one on the Billboard 200, selling 134,000 copies in its first week.

Slave to the Grind received generally positive reviews by music critics. Spin's Daina Darzin said the album had integrity and passion, and reminded her of early Mötley Crüe and Judas Priest.

Martin Popoff called the album "a surprising and welcome jolt to the system", with Skid Row "proving their mettle, their self-worth, their guts" on songs taking the listener "to dark unsettling places where reflection collides with worry."

AllMusic's Steve Huey said Slave to the Grind was more aggressive than its predecessor and called it one of the best examples of mainstream hard rock and heavy metal.

Brenda Herrmann of the Chicago Tribune observed that Bolan and Sabo improved their songwriting and wrote positively about the group's attitude and humor.

Conversely, Rolling Stone's David Fricke thought Skid Row had not matured lyrically at all, rehashing the glam metal cliches. However, he complimented Wagener's production and the band's interplay and sound.

Robert Christgau was less enthusiastic and graded the album a "dud", indicating "a bad record whose details rarely merit further thought".

Janiss Garza of the Entertainment Weekly praised the ballads' lyrical depth and the fury of "Riot Act" and the title track, giving the album an A−.

The album was the first to debut atop the Billboard 200 in the Nielsen SoundScan era, since it was uncommon for albums to open at number one before SoundScan began tracking sales in 1991.

Previously, the only albums to debut at number one had been Elton John's Captain Fantastic and the Brown Dirt Cowboy in 1975 and Michael Jackson's Bad in 1987.

== Track listing ==
Liner notes are adapted from the original LP.

All tracks are written by Dave Sabo and Rachel Bolan, except where noted.

Side 1
No.	Title	Writer(s)	Length
1.	"Monkey Business"		4:20
2.	"Slave to the Grind"	Sabo; Bolan; Sebastian Bach	3:31
3.	"The Threat"		3:52
4.	"Quicksand Jesus"		5:26
5.	"Psycho Love"	Bolan	3:58
6.	"Get the Fuck Out"		2:42

Side 2
No.	Title	Writer(s)	Length
1.	"Livin' on a Chain Gang"		4:00
2.	"Creepshow"	Bolan; Scotti Hill; Rob Affuso	3:59
3.	"In a Darkened Room" (Album liner notes incorrectly list the length as 4:57.)	Sabo; Bolan; Bach	3:57
4.	"Riot Act"		2:42
5.	"Mudkicker"	Bolan; Hill; Bach	3:56
6.	"Wasted Time"	Sabo; Bolan; Bach	5:50
Total length:			48:41

Japanese edition bonus tracks
No.	Title	Writer(s)	Length
1.	"Beggar's Day" (replaces "Get the Fuck Out" on the clean version)	Sabo; Bolan; Bach	4:05
2.	"Holidays in the Sun" (Sex Pistols cover)	Johnny Rotten; Steve Jones; Paul Cook; Sid Vicious	3:38
3.	"Get the Fuck Out" (live at Wembley Stadium, 1991)		5:31
4.	"Delivering the Goods" (Judas Priest cover, live in Arizona, 1992)	Glenn Tipton; K. K. Downing; Rob Halford
5.	Untitled		4:52
Total length:			64:05

== Personnel ==
Liner notes are adapted from the original LP.

Skid Row

- Sebastian Bach
- Dave Sabo
- Scotti Hill
- Rachel Bolan
- Rob Affuso

Production

- Michael Wagener – producer, mixing
- Riley J. Connell – assistant engineer
- Craig Doubet – assistant engineer
- George Marino – mastering
- Bob Defrin – art direction

== Charts ==
Weekly charts

Chart (1991)	Peak position
Australian Albums (ARIA)	3
Austrian Albums (Ö3 Austria)	16
Canada Top Albums/CDs (RPM)	5
Finnish Albums (The Official Finnish Charts)	3
German Albums (Offizielle Top 100)	12
Hungarian Albums (MAHASZ)	32
Japanese Albums (Oricon)	3
New Zealand Albums (RMNZ)	8
Norwegian Albums (VG-lista)	12
Swedish Albums (Sverigetopplistan)	9
Swiss Albums (Schweizer Hitparade)	15
UK Albums (Official Charts)	5
US Billboard 200	1

Chart (2020)	Peak position
US Indie Store Album Sales (Billboard)	23

Chart (2023)	Peak position
UK Rock & Metal Albums (Official Charts)	22

Year-end charts

Chart (1991)	Position
German Albums (Offizielle Top 100)	92
US Billboard 200	54

== Certifications ==
Region	Certification	Certified units/sales
Australia (ARIA)	Gold	35,000^{^}
Canada (Music Canada)	Platinum	100,000^{^}
Japan (RIAJ)	Gold	100,000^{^}
United Kingdom (BPI)	Silver	60,000^{^}
United States (RIAA)	2× Platinum	2,000,000^{^}
^{^} Shipments figures based on certification alone.
