= Subhuman Race =

Studio album by Skid Row
- Released: March 28, 1995
- Recorded: October–December 1994
- Studios: Greenhouse and Seacoast Sound (Vancouver, Canada)
- Genres: Heavy metal; alternative metal
- Length: 56:39
- Label: Atlantic
- Producer: Bob Rock

Skid Row chronology
| B-Side Ourselves (1992) | Subhuman Race (1995) | Subhuman Beings on Tour (1995) |

Singles from Subhuman Race
- 1. "My Enemy" Released: 1995; 2. "Breakin' Down" Released: November 6, 1995; 3. "Into Another" Released: 1995

Subhuman Race (stylized sUBHUMAN rACE) is the third studio album by American heavy metal band Skid Row, released on March 28, 1995, by Atlantic Records. This is the last Skid Row album with singer Sebastian Bach and drummer Rob Affuso, and the last one to be released on Atlantic. Despite receiving positive reviews, Subhuman Race was not as successful as the band's first two albums. Certain tracks from the album were remixed for the band's compilation 40 Seasons: The Best of Skid Row, given slightly cleaner mixes to fit better with the other tracks.

== Overview ==
Released during the decline of hard rock and heavy metal, Subhuman Race marked a significant change in the band's sound, with Bob Rock replacing Michael Wagener as its producer, and resembling a mixture of heavy metal with grunge, alternative, punk rock, thrash metal and groove metal influences. It has also been noted as more of a dark album than previous works.

To promote Subhuman Race, Skid Row supported Van Halen in North America on their Balance tour. Following the album and tour, they released a live EP titled Subhuman Beings on Tour, featuring live performances from the Subhuman Race tour. The band has not played any songs from Subhuman Race since the album's tour in 1995–1996, though Bach has occasionally played them on his solo tours, including "Beat Yourself Blind", "Frozen", and the singles "My Enemy", "Into Another" and "Breakin' Down". "Beat Yourself Blind" was the only song from this album to be performed live since Bach's departure, until ZP Theart performed "Medicine Jar" in 2018, while "Remains to Be Seen" has never been played live once.

The album debuted at #35 on the Billboard 200, staying for nine weeks, being a significant drop off from Slave to the Grind's #1 debut. By July 1999, Subhuman Race has sold 165,424 copies, falling significantly behind their previous records.

== Critical reception ==
Professional ratings
Review scores
| Source | Rating |
|---|---|
| AllMusic | 4/5 stars |
| Chicago Tribune | 2.5/4 stars |
| Collector's Guide to Heavy Metal | 8/10 |
| Entertainment Weekly | D |
| Kerrang! | 4/5 stars |
| Q | 4/5 stars |
| Rock Hard | 7/10 |
| Rolling Stone | 3/5 stars |

Subhuman Race received mixed to mostly positive reviews from music critics. AllMusic's Stephen Thomas Erlewine wrote that it saw the band "strip back their music to the basics" and was their "strongest and most vicious record to date." Rolling Stone reviewer called it "the freshest riffage since last year's Soundgarden record" and also noted the "tight, hot guitar lines and radio hooks that burn themselves into your brain". Q praised both the guitars that "grumble and mutter more menacingly than ever" and Bach's "awesome vocal pyrotechnics", summarizing that "Skid Row has come up with an outright winner." Canadian journalist Martin Popoff found the album quite complex, with Skid Row "absorbing the best elements of grunge into their over-the-top love of all things metal." He praised Bach's performance and the band's "street-savvy" attitude and "prog ethic" shown in the record.

Conversely, Jim Farber of Entertainment Weekly considered Subhuman Race made of "the same squealing, yowling, third-rate metal that made Skid Row pariahs in the first place", calling them an "unrepentant hair band of the '80s" which had mangled their melodies "to get over their old 'power ballad' stigma." Dean Golemis of the Chicago Tribune criticised Skid Row's "campy, formulaic arrangements that still cater to commercial appeal and offer nothing new to a genre plagued by cliches and copycats", but remarked as "Bach's vocal bravura stands as the album's saving grace." Thomas Kupfer in his review for the German Rock Hard magazine wrote that "Skid Row will offend a lot of old fans with this disc", where "mediocrity dominates, the songs seem uninspired, and only the compact sound and the solid craftsmanship of the band members" save the album.

The band members also do not reflect positively on their work on Subhuman Race. In an interview in November 2006, bassist Rachel Bolan expressed his negative feelings about the album: "That record was a nightmare. Internally the band had fallen apart but we were forced to go in and do another record and it was a nightmare with the recording, writing and producing. We worked with someone we had not worked with before after being so successful with Michael and we were used to the way he did things. I am not slighting Bob at all, he is a genius producer but it was bad timing. I did not have the greatest time, it was nobody's fault, it was just the way things were. Also the record absolutely sucks." In a June 2018 interview on the "Rock Talk with Mitch Lafon" podcast, vocalist Sebastian Bach indicated that, despite featuring "some good tunes", the "very dated production sound" of Subhuman Race has made it an unlistenable album: "In the same way, probably, Lars Ulrich might think St. Anger is dated to that time, I think Subhuman Race might be our St. Anger."

== Track listing ==
| No. | Title | Writer(s) | Length |
|---|---|---|---|
| 1. | "My Enemy" | Scotti Hill; Rob Affuso; Rachel Bolan | 3:38 |
| 2. | "Firesign" | Sebastian Bach; Hill; Bolan; Dave Sabo | 4:54 |
| 3. | "Bonehead" | Bolan; Sabo | 2:16 |
| 4. | "Beat Yourself Blind" | Bach; Hill; Bolan; Sabo | 5:02 |
| 5. | "Eileen" | Bach; Affuso; Bolan; Sabo | 5:36 |
| 6. | "Remains to be Seen" | Hill; Bolan; Sabo | 3:34 |
| 7. | "Subhuman Race" | Hill; Bolan; Sabo | 2:40 |
| 8. | "Frozen" | Bolan; Sabo | 4:43 |
| 9. | "Into Another" | Bolan; Sabo | 4:02 |
| 10. | "Face Against My Soul" | Bach; Affuso; Bolan; Sabo | 4:20 |
| 11. | "Medicine Jar" | Hill; Bolan; Sabo | 3:36 |
| 12. | "Breakin' Down" | Sabo | 4:30 |
| 13. | "Iron Will" | Hill; Affuso; Bolan; Sabo | ^{[†]}7:43 |
| Total length: | | | 56:39 |

† The song "Iron Will" ends at 4:45 followed by 2:15 of silence before a hidden track plays.

== Personnel ==
Personnel per liner notes.

Skid Row

- Sebastian Bach – vocals
- Scotti Hill – guitar, backing vocals
- Dave Sabo – guitar, backing vocals
- Rachel Bolan – bass, backing vocals
- Rob Affuso – drums, percussion

Production

- Bob Rock – producer
- Randy Staub – engineer, mixing at The Warehouse Studio, Vancouver, Canada
- Brian Dobbs, Darrin Grahn – assistant engineers
- George Marino – mastering at Sterling Sound, New York City

== Charts ==
| Chart (1995) | Peak position |
|---|---|
| Australian Albums (ARIA) | 5 |
| Canada Top Albums/CDs (RPM) | 31 |
| Dutch Albums (Album Top 100) | 84 |
| Finnish Albums (The Official Finnish Charts) | 15 |
| French Albums (SNEP) | 36 |
| German Albums (Offizielle Top 100) | 57 |
| Japanese Albums (Oricon) | 6 |
| Scottish Albums (Official Charts) | 18 |
| Swedish Albums (Sverigetopplistan) | 21 |
| Swiss Albums (Schweizer Hitparade) | 49 |
| UK Albums (Official Charts) | 8 |
| UK Rock & Metal Albums (Official Charts) | 1 |
| US Billboard 200 | 35 |

== Certifications ==
| Region | Certification | Certified units/sales |
|---|---|---|
| Japan (RIAJ) | Gold | 100,000^{^} |
^{^} Shipments figures based on certification alone.
