= In a Darkened Room =

Single by Skid Row

from the album Slave to the Grind
- Released: November 1991
- Genre: Glam metal
- Length: 3:57
- Label: Atlantic
- Songwriters: Sebastian Bach, Rachel Bolan, Dave Sabo
- Producer: Michael Wagener

Skid Row singles chronology
"Wasted Time" (1991)	"In a Darkened Room" (1991)	"Quicksand Jesus" (1992)

"In a Darkened Room" is a song by American rock band Skid Row, and a single from their second album Slave to the Grind. The song was released in 1991 and written by bandmates Sebastian Bach, Rachel Bolan and Dave "the Snake" Sabo. It charted in Switzerland at number 27.

The song features a music video.

== Track listing ==
1. "In a Darkened Room"
2. "Beggar's Day"
3. "C'mon and Love Me" (originally performed by Kiss)

== Personnel ==
- Sebastian Bach – vocals
- Dave Sabo – guitar
- Scotti Hill – guitar
- Rachel Bolan – bass
- Rob Affuso – drums

== Charts ==
Chart (1991)	Peak position
Australia (ARIA)	157
Switzerland (Schweizer Hitparade)	27
