= Monkey Business (Skid Row song) =

Single by Skid Row

from the album Slave to the Grind
- Released: June 3, 1991
- Length: 4:20
- Label: Atlantic
- Songwriters: Rachel Bolan, Dave Sabo
- Producer: Michael Wagener

Skid Row singles chronology
"I Remember You" (1989)	"Monkey Business" (1991)	"Slave to the Grind" (1991)

"Monkey Business" is a song by American heavy metal band Skid Row. It was released in June 1991 as the lead single from their second album, Slave to the Grind (1991). It was written by bandmates Rachel Bolan and Dave "The Snake" Sabo.

== Background ==
The song was the biggest hit on Slave to the Grind. Although the song did not appear on the US Billboard Hot 100, it reached number 13 on the Album Rock Tracks chart. The song also charted at number 19 on the UK Singles Chart.

== Track listing ==
1. "Monkey Business"
2. "Slave to the Grind"
3. "Riot Act"

== Personnel ==
- Sebastian Bach – lead vocals
- Dave Sabo – lead guitar, backing vocals
- Scotti Hill – rhythm guitar, backing vocals
- Rachel Bolan – bass, backing vocals
- Rob Affuso – drums

== Charts ==
Chart (1991)	Peak position
Australia (ARIA)	31
Canada Top Singles (RPM)	59
Europe (Eurochart Hot 100)	77
Ireland (IRMA)	19
New Zealand (Recorded Music NZ)	21
UK Singles (Official Charts)	19
US Mainstream Rock (Billboard)	13

== Release history ==
Region	Date	Format(s)	Label(s)	Ref.
United Kingdom	June 3, 1991	7-inch vinyl; 12-inch vinyl; CD	Atlantic	
Australia	June 17, 1991	Cassette	Atlantic	
Australia	July 1, 1991	7-inch vinyl; 12-inch vinyl; CD	Atlantic	
Japan	July 10, 1991	Mini-CD	Atlantic	

== Covers ==
- Croatian hard rock band Animal Drive covered the song on their EP Back to the Roots (2019).
