= Slave to the Grind (song) =

Single by Skid Row

from the album Slave to the Grind
- Released: September 2, 1991
- Genre: Speed metal; glam metal
- Length: 3:31
- Label: Atlantic
- Songwriters: Sebastian Bach; Rachel Bolan; Dave Sabo
- Producer: Michael Wagener

Skid Row singles chronology
"Monkey Business" (1991)	"Slave to the Grind" (1991)	"Wasted Time" (1991)

"Slave to the Grind" is a song by American rock band Skid Row, written by bandmates Sebastian Bach, Rachel Bolan, and Dave "The Snake" Sabo. It is title track from their second album, Slave to the Grind (1991), and was released as the album's second single on September 2, 1991. The song reached number 43 on the UK Singles Chart.

== Track listing ==
1. "Slave to the Grind"
2. "Creepshow"
3. "C'Mon And Love Me" (originally performed by Kiss)
4. "Beggar's Day"

== Personnel ==
- Sebastian Bach – vocals
- Dave Sabo – guitars
- Scotti Hill – guitars
- Rachel Bolan – bass
- Rob Affuso – drums

== Charts ==
Chart (1991)	Peak position
UK Singles (Official Charts)	43
