= Starjob =

EP by The Frogs
- Released: May 6, 1997
- Recorded: 1994
- Genre: Alternative rock
- Length: 15:57
- Label: Scratchie Records/Mercury Records; Polygram
- Producer: Johnny Goat

The Frogs chronology
My Daughter the Broad (1996)	Starjob (1997)	Bananimals (1998)

Professional ratings
Review scores
Source	Rating
Allmusic	2.5/5 stars
Pitchfork Media	(8.6/10)

Starjob is an EP by The Frogs that was recorded in 1994, and finally released in 1997. Billy Corgan produced the record under the alias "Johnny Goat", and Jimmy Chamberlin played bongos on the song "Raped".

The songs on Starjob deal with celebrity and fame, although the songs "Raped" and "Weird on the Avenue" continue the perverse themes of previous albums. "I Only Play 4 Money" may be the most well known song by the band, which contains the lyrics "I don't give a fuck about the fans" and "if you send me fanmail/I won't write back". "Lord Grunge" is an homage to Kurt Cobain, and references The Who, Black Sabbath, Black Flag and the Beatles as the forefathers of grunge.

Jimmy Flemion, on a Facebook post relating to a rough mix of the release in which Kurt Cobain had received in early 1994, stated in 2023, that he wrote the track “Lord Grunge” after seeing Mudhoney at Marquette University on April 18, 1993, but the chorus & bridge section of “Lord Grunge” Jimmy wrote later in 1993, possibly around the time of the band met and saw Nirvana, in October 1993 during the In Utero tour.

Flemion stated that the song “Raped” was written April 18, 1991, while “Weird” was written March 5, 1992, “Starboy” was written November 5, 1992, “I Only play 4 Money” was written February 19, 1993, with “Prick” (1st section of “I Only Play 4 Money”) also written on February 19, 1993. “I Only Play 4 Money”’s chorus section was written on October 19, 1985, and that “Stargirl” was written on September 27, 1994.

This release is considerably better-produced than most of the Frogs' previous material, which can sound like home recordings.

In November 2023, Starjob + was released digitally, which contains demo and rough mixes of Starjob music.

== Track listing ==
Starjob Track listing
No.	Title	Length
1.	"Lord Grunge"	2:30
2.	"Raped"	1:38
3.	"Weird on the Avenue"	2:13
4.	"Starboy"	2:42
5.	"I Only Play 4 Money"	4:33
6.	"Stargirl"	2:20
Total length:		15:57

== Personnel ==
- Jimmy Flemion - Guitars, bass, lead vocals
- Dennis Flemion - Drums, keyboards, backing vocals
- Billy Corgan - Additional guitar, bass, backing vocals
- Jimmy Chamberlin - Additional percussion

== See also ==
- 1991: The Year Punk Broke
- Seattle Sound
