= Racially Yours =

Studio album by The Frogs
- Released: 2000
- Recorded: 1990–1993
- Genres: Folk rock, acoustic rock
- Length: 1:00:40
- Label: Four Alarm Records
- Producer: The Frogs

The Frogs chronology
Bananimals (1999)	Racially Yours (2000)	Hopscotch Lollipop Sunday Surprise (2000)

Singles from Racially Yours
- 1. "Now You Know You're Black" Released: 1994

Professional ratings
Review scores
Source	Rating
AllMusic	2.5/5 stars
The Encyclopedia of Popular Music	3/5 stars

Racially Yours is the fifth Studio Album by the band the Frogs, released in 2000. The album was originally presented to Homestead Records in the early '90s, but they refused to release it due to its controversial subject matter. At this point the album only consisted of the first 12 songs. After much delay, it was released in 2000 on Four Alarm Records with an additional 13 tracks, and a tongue-in-cheek sticker proclaiming it "the most controversial album of all time."

Unlike the sexually charged and comedic material on It's Only Right and Natural and My Daughter the Broad, Racially Yours focuses on subjects such as American racism, genocide and patriotism. The songs are sung from the point of view of both African Americans and white Americans. The lyrics are as serious as they are satirical; in the song "Blackman, Blackman", Dennis quips, "a black man's heaven is a white man's hell." In "The Flag", Jimmy urges, "brother, let's make the flag red, white and 'black'."

== Critical reception ==
The A.V. Club wrote that "at 60 musically primitive minutes, Racially Yours can feel as much like cultural homework as any number of albums that wear strident identity politics on their sleeve, but it's an audacious footnote that fully earns its notorious reputation." SF Weekly wrote: "Surprisingly, the album is less over-the-top parody than expected; in fact, it's relatively somber and serious, making interpretation even more difficult."

== Track listing ==
1. "Truth"
2. "Holidays 4 King"
3. "Sorry I'm White"
4. "White Guy"
5. "400 Years"
6. "Racially Yours"
7. "Now You Know You're Black"
8. "White Like Me"
9. "My Slave"
10. "Freedom"
11. "Whitefully Dead"
12. "BlackMan, BlackMan"
13. "Full of Monkeys"
14. "I Had a Dream"
15. "Revolution"
16. "Massa"
17. "Darkmeat 4 Sale"
18. "The Flag"
19. "An Unwanted Child & A Wanted Man"
20. "2 Blacks Don't Make a White"
21. "The Purification of the Race"
22. "You're a Bigot"
23. "The Blue-eyed Devil & Brown-eyed Angel"
24. "Uncle Sam Loves U"
25. "Prejudiced"

== Personnel ==
- Jimmy Flemion – Guitars, Keyboards, Vocals on 01–03, 05–10, 13, 15–23, 25
- Dennis Flemion – Drums, Keyboards, Vocals on 04, 11–12, 14, 24
