= Greatest Hits (Wesley Willis album) =

Compilation album by Wesley Willis
- Released: July 7, 1995
- Recorded: 1992–1995
- Genre: Alternative rock; outsider music; spoken word
- Length: 60:58
- Label: Alternative Tentacles

Wesley Willis chronology
Fireman Rick (1995)	Greatest Hits (1995)	Jason Rau (1996)

Professional ratings
Review scores
Source	Rating
AllMusic	2.5/5 stars

Greatest Hits is a greatest hits compilation album by the American musician Wesley Willis, released on July 7, 1995.

== Background ==
The album is a compilation of songs from Willis' output from 1992 to 1995, compiled by Alternative Tentacles' label manager Jello Biafra. This includes then-unreleased tracks and over 10 CDs. Most songs follow Willis' trademark style of simplistic, repetitive songwriting and lyrics that discuss influences, comical situations, and personal issues of physical and mental health due to Willis's chronic schizophrenia. Most of his songs use instrumentals made with a 1980's Casio keyboard. His songs often end with the phrase "Rock over London, rock on Chicago," followed by a sponsor, such as "Wheaties: Breakfast of Champions."

== Reception ==
In a review for AllMusic, Blake Butler wrote the CD is "a must for everyone with a sense of humor".

== Track listing ==
Adapted from CD liner notes.

All tracks are written by Wesley Willis.

Original CD release
No.	Title	Length
1.	"Rock N Roll McDonalds"	2:26
2.	"Larry Nevers/Walter Budzyn"	2:41
3.	"Rick Sims"	2:27
4.	"Outburst"	2:44
5.	"Chronic Schizophrenia"	3:10
6.	"Urge Overkill"	2:07
7.	"Skrew"	2:02
8.	"Tammy Smith"	2:08
9.	"Vampire Bat"	2:40
10.	"Elvis Presley"	2:26
11.	"The Chicken Cow"	2:29
12.	"Kris Kringle Was a Car Thief"	3:24
13.	"Eazy-E"	2:04
14.	"Jesus is the Answer" (with the Wesley Willis Fiasco)	3:59
15.	"He's Doing Time in Jail" (with the Wesley Willis Fiasco)	3:35
16.	"I'm Sorry that I Got Fat" (with the Wesley Willis Fiasco)	4:00
17.	"Aftab Noorani"	2:28
18.	"Northwest Airlines"	2:45
19.	"I Wupped Batman's Ass"	3:27
20.	"Who Killed John Columbo"	3:12
21.	"Stabbing Westward"	2:18
22.	"Richard Speck"	2:25
Total length:		60:58

- Note: the 1995 vinyl version removes track 15; the 2001 vinyl version removes tracks 16, 20, and 21.

== Personnel ==
Adapted from LP liner notes:

- Wesley Willis – writer, vocals, programming, artwork
- Jello Biafra – compiler
- Wesley Willis Fiasco – backing band (14-16)
  - Dale Meiners – guitar, bass guitar, mixing (tracks 14, 15), recording (tracks 14–16)
  - Pat Barnard - guitar
  - Dave Nooks - bass guitar
  - Brendan Murphy - drums
- John Yates – additional art, layout
