= HLSS =

HLSS can refer to:

- Half-Life Sound Selector, a program that allows users to play audio files using voice communication on games developed by Valve.
- Heart Lake Secondary School, a high school in Brampton, Ontario, Canada
- Hopscotch Lollipop Sunday Surprise, a 2001 album by The Frogs
- School of Humanities, Languages and Social Sciences (UWE), Bristol
