= Hopscotch Lollipop Sunday Surprise =

Studio album by The Frogs
- Released: 6 February 2001
- Recorded: 1995–2000
- Genre: Alternative rock, electronic, industrial
- Label: Scratchie Records
- Producer: John Hiler

The Frogs chronology
Racially Yours (2000)	Hopscotch Lollipop Sunday Surprise (2001)	Count Yer Blessingsz (2012)

Professional ratings
Review scores
Source	Rating
Allmusic	4/5 stars

Hopscotch Lollipop Sunday Surprise is the sixth studio album by The Frogs, released in 2001. Although brushing on satirical homoerotic and religious themes, the album chiefly consists of serious love songs. Musically, the album features heavy electric guitars, acoustic guitars, and industrial/electronic beats mixed. There is also a cover of Bob Dylan's 1973 song, "Billy 1". Hopscotch is considerably better-produced than most of the Frogs' material, which can sometimes be no more than home recordings. Scratchie Records released the album in early 2001 but cut further distribution after weak initial sales, much to the band's disgust.

== Track listing ==
All tracks written by Jimmy Flemion unless otherwise noted.

No.	Title	Writers	Length
1.	"Whisper"		3:14
2.	"Sleep on the Street"		2:26
3.	"The Longing Goes Away"		3:03
4.	"Bad Daddy"		2:39
5.	"Bear"		3:08
6.	"Jewels"		2:13
7.	"Better Than God"		3:40
8.	"Know It All"		2:20
9.	"Nipple Clamps"		3:22
10.	"Bad Mommy"		2:24
11.	"Billy"	Bob Dylan	2:38
12.	"Fuck Off"		2:06
13.	"Enter I"		1:57
Total length:			35:20

== 2022 Edition ==
On May 8, 2022, Jimmy Flemion announced the release of Hopscotch Lollipop Sundae Surprise (Alternate 2022 Edition), which contains new mixes and versions of the original album.

== Personnel ==
- Jimmy Flemion - Guitar, Bass, Vocals
- Dennis Flemion - Drums, Keyboards, Samples, Vocals
- Billy Corgan - Additional Guitar, Keyboards & Samples

=== Additional production ===
- Billy Corgan aka Johnny Goat ("The Longing Goes Away")
- Chuck E. Myers ("Better Than God")
- Bjorn Thorsrud (engineering, mixing & editing)
- John Hiler (engineering & mixing)

== See also ==
- Pat Garrett & Billy the Kid (1973)
