= It's Only Right and Natural =

Studio album by The Frogs
- Released: 27 March 1989
- Recorded: 1986–1988
- Genre: Alternative rock, comedy rock
- Length: 28:24
- Label: Homestead Records
- Producer: The Frogs

The Frogs chronology
| The Frogs (1988) | It's Only Right and Natural (1989) | My Daughter the Broad (1996) |

Professional ratings
Review scores
| Source | Rating |
|---|---|
| AllMusic | 4.5/5 stars |
| Tiny Mix Tapes | 5/5 stars |

It's Only Right and Natural is the second studio album by the band The Frogs and was released in 1989 by Homestead Records. Gerard Cosloy, who was in charge of Homestead at the time, came into possession of some of the Flemion Brothers' improvised homemade tapes and signed them to the label. The Flemions were originally hoping that Homestead would release their debut album The Frogs, but Cosloy convinced them to release a gay-themed album instead. The album was recorded on 4-Track reel-to-reel in Dennis's living room and was originally meant to be for the Flemion brothers and their friends' own amusement, and was not originally considered for release.

Most of the songs on the album deal with stereotypes associated with homosexuality, especially negative ones used by social conservatives. The lyrics are highly satirical and portray stereotypes in an absurdly over-the-top manner. Shortly before the album's release, the Flemions went forward with a gay-themed live act, with Dennis wearing a trademark pink sailor suit. Audiences who knew the Frogs from their earlier material were often confused by this change of direction. The album has since become an underground classic. The album's cover depicts a very young Dennis Flemion wearing a gay pride button. The album was a frequent target of conservative Christians at the time of its release, and was featured in the video series "Hell's Bells: The Dangers of Rock 'N' Roll" (as chronicled on Toy Porno).

The band were chosen by Animal Collective to perform the album in its entirety at the All Tomorrow's Parties festival that they curated in May 2011.

== Track listing ==
It's Only Right and Natural Track listing
| No. | Title | Length |
|---|---|---|
| 1. | "I've Got Drugs (Out of the Mist)" | 2:20 |
| 2. | "I Don't Care If U Disrespect Me (Just So You Love Me)" | 2:04 |
| 3. | "Hot Cock Annie" | 2:19 |
| 4. | "These Are the Finest Queen Boys (I've Ever Seen)" | 2:12 |
| 5. | "Rosy Jack World" | 2:23 |
| 6. | "Someone's Pinning Me to the Ground" | 1:44 |
| 7. | "Baby Greaser George" | 1:54 |
| 8. | "(Thank God I Died in) The Car Crash" | 2:12 |
| 9. | "Gather 'Round for Savior #2" | 2:35 |
| 10. | "Richard Dick Richards" | 1:40 |
| 11. | "Men (Come on Men)" | 2:39 |
| 12. | "Dykes Are We" | 3:02 |
| 13. | "Been a Month Since I Had a Man" | 2:27 |
| 14. | "Homos" | 1:55 |
| Total length: | | 28:24 |

== Personnel ==
- Jimmy Flemion - Guitars, Cello, Lead Vocals on 01, 07, 09, 12–14, Backing Vocals on 05
- Dennis Flemion - Drums, Keyboards, Lead Vocals on 01–06, 08, 10–11, Backing Vocals on 12

== Influence ==
- The album was one of Kurt Cobain's favorites. It was on the Nirvana Top 50 albums list.
- The quip "That was a good drum break" from the song "I Don't Care If U Disrespect Me (Just So You Love Me)" was sampled for the song "Where It's At" by Beck.
- DJ Rozwell, under the alias of "KFC Murder Chicks", sampled the pre-first verse instrumental part of "I Don't Care If U Disrespect Me (Just So You Love Me)" for his song "Tsundere".
- Nick Oliveri's band Mondo Generator named their album A Drug Problem That Never Existed (2003), after a lyric in the song "I've Got Drugs (Out Of The Mist)".
- Blake Babies named an EP Rosy Jack World after this album's fifth song.
- Australian punk band Frenzal Rhomb covered the song "Homos" from this album, which was released on their "i miss my lung" single and also in the traveling flea circus release.
- The Lemonheads have performed "Homos" and possibly other Frogs songs in concert.
