= Bananimals =

Studio album by the Frogs
- Released: 12 October 1999
- Recorded: 1986–1995
- Genre: Folk rock
- Length: 34:26
- Label: 4 Alarm Records
- Producer: The Frogs

The Frogs chronology
My Daughter the Broad (1996)	Bananimals (1999)	Racially Yours (2000)

Professional ratings
Review scores
Source	Rating
AllMusic	4.5/5 stars
Austin Chronicle	2/5 stars
PopMatters	unfavorable

Bananimals is the fourth studio album recorded by the band the Frogs. It was released in 1999 on Four Alarm Records. It is the third in a series of Frogs albums that contain improvised home recordings. The album continues the themes of homosexual and sadistic eroticism, but also briefly touches on the music scene of the early 1990s. The first track, "Pay" details smashing the records of lo-fi contemporaries Pavement, Sebadoh, Sonic Youth and Wesley Willis. The tracks "Für Z Musik Biz" and "My Show Business Days" detail the brothers' growing dissatisfaction with the music business. The track "Evil Arnold" continues the split personality saga of murderous Evil Jack from 1996's My Daughter the Broad.

== Sound ==
The sound is a return to the earlier, less-produced Frogs albums. Many of the Frogs lyrical conventions (including homosexuality) are still prevalent, with "Sailors Board Me Now" being a prime example of both lyrical content and recording production.

== Track listing ==
1. "Pay"
2. "La Da Da Da, La Da Da Dee, La Da Da Dum Dum"
3. "Love Me Or Die Bitch"
4. "Evil Arnold (w/ The Ugly Name)"
5. "Is It Right to Kiss the Boys (When You're a Girl and Not a Boy?)"
6. "One of Them Wore Wings, the Other Did the Painting"
7. "Golden Showers"
8. "Dead Pussy in the Road w/ Mother's Name on Top"
9. "U Bastards"
10. "(Try Out My New) Sex Doll Baby!!!"
11. "Love in the Sand"
12. "Für Z Muzik Biz (10 Years to Waste)"
13. "Blonde & Beautiful, Beat-up (and the Bitch was Young)"
14. "I'm Back to Women (I Couldn't Keep It Up)"
15. "My Show Business Days"
16. "Sailors Board Me Now"

== Personnel ==
- Jimmy Flemion – Guitar, Keyboards, Vocals on 02 & 13
- Dennis Flemion – Drums, Keyboards, Vocals on 01, 03–12, 14–16
- Jay Tiller – Bass
