= The Frogs (album) =

Studio album by the Frogs
- Released: August 8, 1988
- Recorded: 1986–1988
- Studio: Pearl (Milwaukee)
- Genre: Pop rock; synth-pop
- Length: 33:57
- Label: Self-released; Moikai Records (reissue)
- Producer: The Frogs

The Frogs chronology
The Frogs (1988)	It's Only Right and Natural (1989)

Professional ratings
Review scores
Source	Rating
AllMusic	3/5 stars

The Frogs is the debut studio album by American rock band the Frogs. It was originally released in limited quantities (only 1010 LP copies), and was re-released on CD by Moikai Records in 1999. The album was self-produced on 8-track and took a long time to record because of the engineer's limited availability. After this album the Frogs would release recordings made at home. This debut gave listeners a mere taste of the black humor that was to follow on their second album. In 2022, an "addition" version was released onto streaming services, containing alternate mixes and demos of the tracks.

== Track listing ==
No.	Title	Length
1.	"And So You're the King""	1:51
2.	"C-r-y"	1:47
3.	"Layin Down My Love 4 U"	2:10
4.	"Ocean Tide"	1:52
5.	"She was a Mortal"	2:15
6.	"I'm a Jesus Child"	1:50
7.	"What the Trouble Was"	2:03
8.	"Funhouse"	2:11
9.	"Buried Me Alive"	1:43
10.	"Smile"	1:50
11.	"Persian cat"	2:12
12.	"F'd Over Jesus"	2:36
13.	"Hades High School"	2:05
14.	"Don't B Afraid"	2:39
15.	"I Can't Remember"	1:59
16.	"Whether U Like It or Not I Love U"	2:55
Total length:		33:57

=== "Addition" version ===
1. "F'd Over Jesus (In Strum Mental)
2. "Hades High School (Scream)"
3. "Trap"
4. "She Was A Mortal (Immortal Mix)"
5. "Ocean Tide (In Strum Mental)"
6. "C-R-Y (Demo)
7. "Why Did It Have 2 Rain?"
8. "Smile (Aaron's Calling!)"
9. "What the Trouble Was with Your Mind"
10. "Layin' Down My Love 4 U (In Strum Mental)
11. "Buried Me Alive (Demo)"
12. "Therapist"
13. "And so You're the King (3 Guitars)"
14. "F'd over Jesus #2"
15. "Don't B Afraid (Demo)"
16. "Funhouse #2"
17. "I Can't Remember (Irish Grandpa)"
18. "Ocean Tide (Top Hat Mix)"
19. "I'm a Jesus Child (Joy Ride Mix)"
20. "Purrsion Cat"
21. "Whether U Like It or Not I Love U (Demo)"
22. "I Can't Remember (In Strum Mental)"

== Personnel ==
- Jimmy Flemion - Guitar, Bass, Lead Vocals
- Dennis Flemion - Drums, Keyboards, Backing Vocals, Lead Vocal on "F'd Over Jesus"
