= Scratchie =

Scratchie and similar may refer to:

- Scratchcard, a type of card with portions that can be scratched off to reveal information
- Scratchie Records, an independent record label
- Scratchy, a fictional character in the Itchy & Scratchy Show, part of The Simpsons
