= Wesley Willis =

American musician and artist (1963–2003)

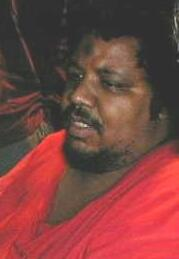
- Willis in October 2000

Background information
- Born: Wesley Lawrence Willis; May 31, 1963; Chicago, Illinois, U.S.
- Died: August 21, 2003 (aged 40) Skokie, Illinois, U.S.
- Genres: Outsider music; punk rock
- Instruments: Vocals; keyboards; guitar
- Years active: 1976–2003 (as artist); 1989–2003 (as musician)
- Labels: W. Willis Records; Alternative Tentacles; American Recordings; Cornerstone R.A.S.; Fuse; Ghetto Love; Oglio; Typhoid Mary
- Formerly of: Wesley Willis Fiasco; The Dragnews
- Website: Wesley Willis on Alternative Tentacles

Wesley Lawrence Willis (May 31, 1963 – August 21, 2003) was an American musician and visual artist. Diagnosed with schizophrenia in 1989, Willis began a career as an underground singer-songwriter in the outsider music tradition. Willis' songs are typically partially spoken in an MC style, and partially sung in a nasal and out-of-tune manner reminiscent of punk rock vocals. They feature bizarre, humorous and sometimes obscene or absurd lyrics sung over backing created by using the auto accompaniment feature on his Technics KN keyboard. His songs cover a wide variety of topics, with mental illness and consumerism being the most prominent themes. Dubbed "The Daddy of Rock 'n' Roll", he is best known for songs such as "Rock N Roll McDonald's" as well as a series of songs where he would directly insult his demons.

Willis gained a large cult following in the 1990s, particularly after the release of his 1995 Greatest Hits album on the Alternative Tentacles label. Jello Biafra compiled the album's track list. In addition to a large body of solo musical work, Willis fronted his own punk rock band, the Wesley Willis Fiasco, during the 1990s. He was a visual artist long before he developed an interest in music, and produced hundreds of intricate, unusual, colored ink-pen drawings, most of them depicting Chicago streetscapes; he frequently sold these on the street for between $20 and $40.

Despite his mainly underground career, Willis has influenced a variety of media. For example, music software company Nullsoft took their slogan "It really whips the llama's ass!" for Winamp from Willis's song "Whip the Llama's Ass".

== Life and career ==
Wesley Lawrence Willis was born in Chicago, Illinois, on May 31, 1963, to Walter and Annie Willis. According to the Los Angeles Times, "Willis grew up in Chicago's projects as one of 10 children of parents who had a violent relationship and separated when he was young; he spent time in several foster homes and was essentially raised by two older brothers, who went with him from home to home." His brothers include Ricky, who is also a disabled artist, and Jerry, who worked as an exterminator as of 2014. Willis began hearing voices during a period of living at his mother's home in the 1980s, when her abusive boyfriend Roger Lee Carpenter held a gun to his head and robbed him of $600 Willis had saved. By the end of the 1980s, he was diagnosed with paranoid schizophrenia and institutionalized for two months after his diagnosis.

Willis reportedly expressed a desire to become an architect. During childhood, he developed an interest in art, and in 1988, he was featured in a Chicago public access documentary feature created by Carl W. Hart titled Wesley Willis: Artist of the Streets. In Artist of the Streets, he was shown walking through Chicago's Loop neighborhood, producing his ink pen drawings outside of the Marshall Field and Company Building, and interacting with people curious about his art. The drawings typically encompass detailed Chicago streetscapes, including buildings, vehicles, trees, and landmarks. Willis was known for his ability to draw from memory a completely different location than the one in which he was sitting. During his lifetime, he frequently gave his drawings away to friends or sold them for small amounts (typically $10 or $20) in Chicago parks. However, after his death, Willis began to receive recognition in the art community for his large body of visual art. In 2008 his artwork was exhibited at the Mohamed Khalil Museum of Egypt, and he was the subject of a special exhibit entitled Drawn by Wesley Willis at Dominican University.

In 1991, after befriending some musicians from Chicago's alternative rock scene and recording several solo albums, he formed the punk rock band the Wesley Willis Fiasco. The band developed a popular underground following as well as attention from musicians such as Eddie Vedder, Henry Rollins, Mike D, Jello Biafra, and the members of White Zombie; and soon caught the attention of Rick Rubin at American Recordings, an independent label distributed by Warner Bros. Records. In early 1994, Willis recorded with the Canadian industrial-metal band Monster Voodoo Machine and appeared on their Juno Award-winning debut studio album Suffersystem (RCA Records). In 1995, American Recordings signed Willis as a solo musician; the Wesley Willis Fiasco subsequently broke up in 1996. He went on to record numerous solo albums of novelty rock (two for American Recordings and the remainder for several independent labels or recorded, marketed and released independently by Willis himself), toured frequently, and was profiled on MTV. On September 26, 1996, he was a guest on The Howard Stern Show where he played songs about Baba Booey and Howard Stern. During his many tours and live appearances, Willis became "famous for greeting fans with a headbutt"; this left him with a distinctive permanent bruise on his forehead.

== Death ==
On August 21, 2003, Willis died due to complications from chronic myelogenous leukemia in Skokie, Illinois, at age 40.

== Legacy ==
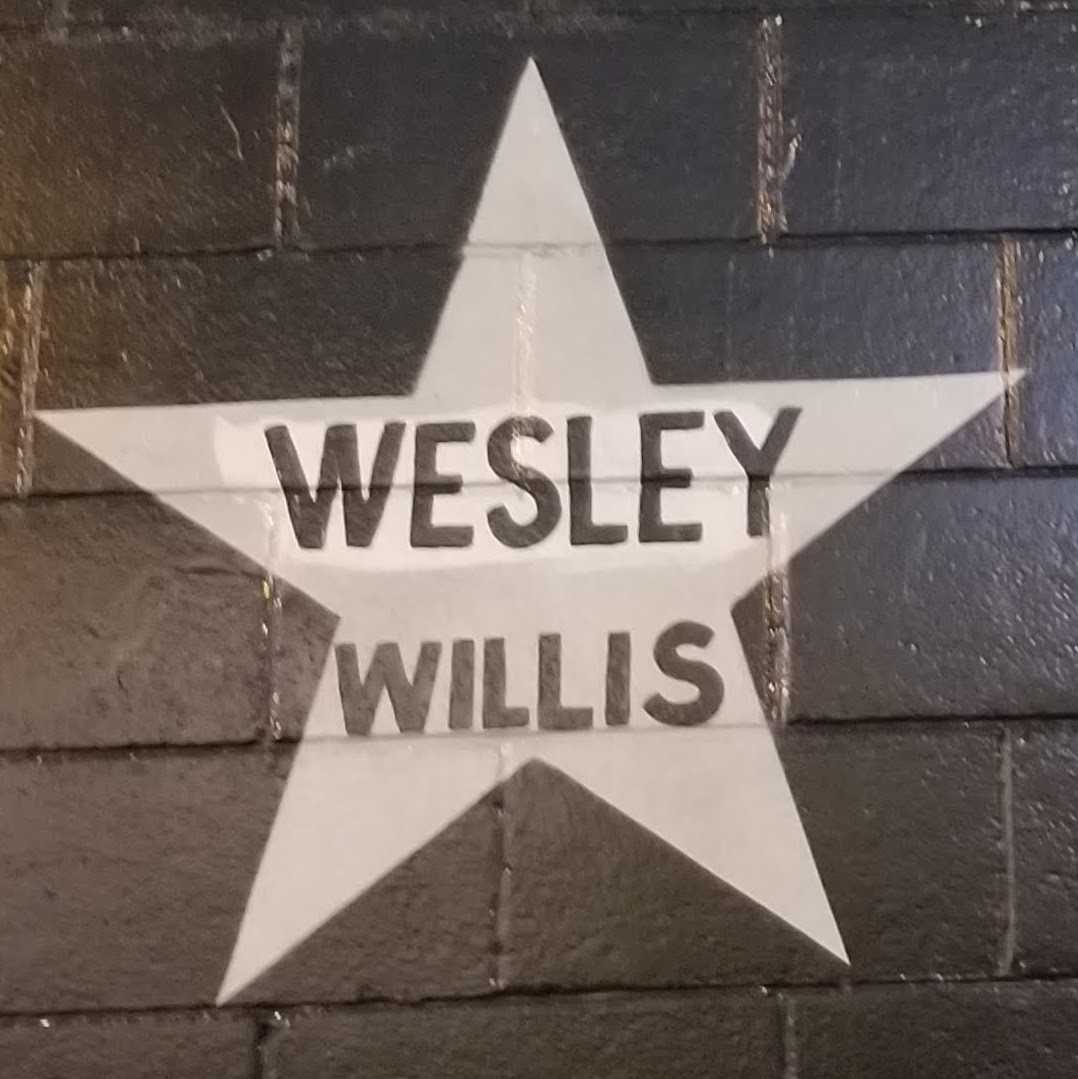
Willis's star on the outside mural of the Minneapolis nightclub First Avenue

In 2013, a supporting character named Milan was introduced for the ongoing Wonder Woman comic. A blind demigod with the power of far-sight and half-brother to Wonder Woman, his physical appearance and mannerisms are based on Wesley Willis.

Willis has been honored with a star on the outside mural of the Minneapolis nightclub First Avenue, recognizing performers that have played sold-out shows or have otherwise demonstrated a major contribution to the culture at the iconic venue. Receiving a star "might be the most prestigious public honor an artist can receive in Minneapolis", according to journalist Steve Marsh.

== Song structure and themes ==
"Hellride" was the term used by Willis to describe his encounters with "demons" (delusions brought on by schizophrenia), which occurred mainly on the CTA bus lines in Chicago. According to Willis, his demons were trying to ruin his "Harmony Joy Music" or "Joy Rides". Every song ends with Willis saying the phrase "rock over London, rock on Chicago", plus a commercial tagline, such as "Wheaties: Breakfast of Champions", or "Ford: Quality is Job One".

The Wesley Willis Fiasco songs were punk rock songs with Willis howling his obscene, absurd rants as lyrics. The band recorded three cover songs, including of Thin Lizzy's "Jailbreak", though the band only released one album.

As a solo artist, Willis filled his albums with funny, bizarre, tense, and often obscene statements about crime, fast food, cultural trends, bus routes, violent confrontations with superheroes, musicians (especially those whom Willis opened for), and commands for his "demons" to engage in bestiality (in The Daddy of Rock 'n' Roll, Willis explained that these songs would "gross out" the demons enough to make them leave him alone).

Critic Stephen Thomas Erlewine of AllMusic wrote that despite Willis' prolific output his songs were essentially variations on the same simple structure, melody and lyrical themes. Although he admired Willis for defying his schizophrenia, he suspected that audiences may have laughed at him rather than with him, and felt that his condition made critical judgement and listening challenging.

== Partial discography ==
- 1994 Radiohead
- 1994 Double Door
- 1994 Machine Gun Kelly
- 1994 Mr. Magoo Goes to Jail
- 1994 Prisonshake
- 1994 Rev Norb #1
- 1994 Reverent Norb No. 2
- 1995 Atomic Records
- 1995 Delilah's
- 1995 Drag Disharmony Hellride
- 1995 Fireman Rick
- 1995 Greatest Hits
- 1995 Jason Rau
- 1995 Rock Power
- 1995 Tammy Smith
- 1995 Never Love A Fish
- 1995 Dr. Wax
- 1995 Wesley Willis (Fuse Records)
- 1995 Daren Hacker (Wesley Willis Records)
- 1995 Wesley Willis (Alternative Tentacles)
- 1996 Spookydisharmoniousconflicthellride (with the Wesley Willis Fiasco) (Urban Legends Records)
- 1996 Mr. Magoo Goes to Jail Vol. 1
- 1996 Mr. Magoo Goes to Jail Vol. 2
- 1996 Mr. Magoo Goes to Jail Vol. 3
- 1996 New York New York
- 1996 Fabian Road Warrior (American Recordings)
- 1996 Feel the Power (American Recordings)
- 1996 Rock 'n' Roll Will Never Die (Oglio Records)
- 1996 Black Light Diner
- 1997 Metal Clink Punishment Jail
- 1998 Rock 'N' Roll Jackflash
- 1998 SMD Promotions
- 1999 Dead End Street
- 1999 Greatest Hits Vol. 2 (Alternative Tentacles)
- 1999 Silver Fish Sea World
- 2000 Guitar Rock of Ages
- 2000 Shake Your Piggy Bank (Coldfront Records)
- 2000 Joe Hunter (Wesley Willis Records)
- 2000 Joe Hunter #2
- 2000 Never Kill an Ape (Wesley Willis Records)
- 2000 Rush Hour (Alternative Tentacles)
- 2001 ASCAP
- 2001 Fool's Gold
- 2001 Torture Demon Hellride
- 2001 Full Heavy Metal Jacket
- 2001 Live EP (with the Wesley Willis Fiasco) (Cornerstone R.A.S.)
- 2001 North Carolina Highway Patrol (Wesley Willis Records)
- 2003 Greatest Hits Vol. 3 (Alternative Tentacles)

The only records from Willis that have been professionally released for download or streaming are Greatest Hits (Vol. 1–3), Rock 'n' Roll Will Never Die, and Rock Power.
