= Fondly =

American punk rock band

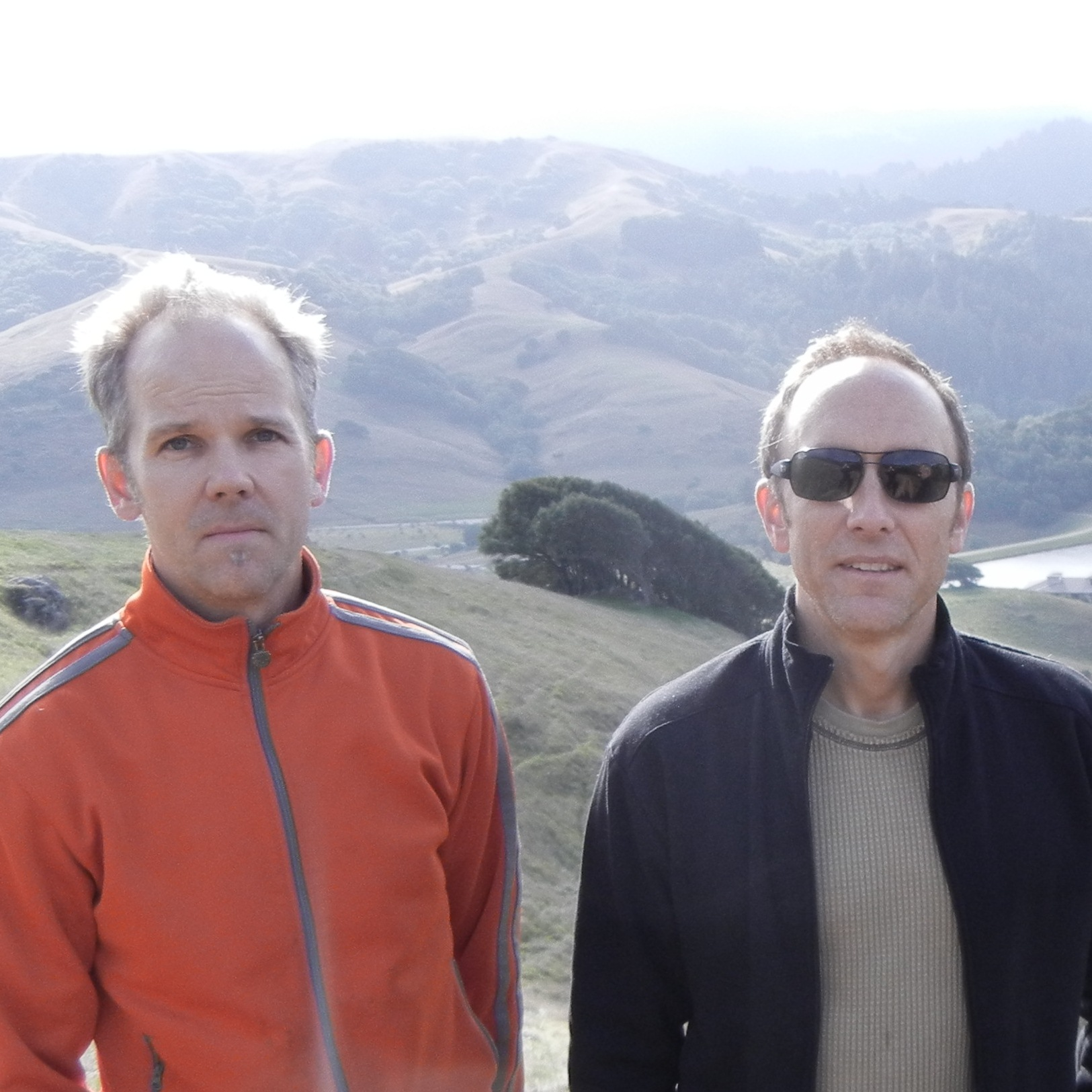
- Fondly in 2011, Andy Grzenia (left), Brian Burkhard (right)

Background information
- Origin: Chicago, Illinois, United States
- Genres: Indie rock, experimental rock, Krautrock, underground music
- Years active: 1993–1998; 2012–present
- Labels: Scratchie/Mercury, Bent Records
- Members: Brian Burkhard; Andy Grzenia
- Past members: Dick Simpson; Tom Shover; Tom Ellis; Michael Stirk

Fondly was originally a Chicago-based American trio that produced two albums of indie punk in the mid to late 1990s. Brian Burkhard, Andy Grzenia, and Dick Simpson were the three original members. They released a self-titled CD (1995) - recorded in Brian Deck's basement. At the time, Brian Deck was a member of the Chicago band, Red Red Meat who later went on to work with bands and artists including Modest Mouse, Iron & Wine, and Califone. The album got great reviews and was named album of the year by James VanOsdal - Host of Q101's local show.

The album's acclaim earned Fondly a recording contract with local label, Scratchie Records, which was founded by James Iha and D'arcy Wretzky (ex-The Smashing Pumpkins) and Adam Schlesinger (Fountains of Wayne, Ivy). Dick Simpson left the band after the release of the first album and was replaced by Tom Shover. They released "F is For" (Scratchie/Mercury) in 1997 - also recorded by Brian Deck. Some tracks were recorded in the Idful Music Corporation in Chicago. Fondly toured the Midwest and East Coast in support of the album but, by the following year, had stopped playing.

Brian Burkhard and Andy Grzenia, who remained close friends, went on to play in other bands. After moving to Los Angeles, Grzenia joined Artichoke as their bassist for some time. In 2002, Burkhard released an electronica album called Solid State Alone, under the name Echolalia. Burkhard went on to play as a keyboardist in a few Chicago bands. In 2006, Burkhard won a songwriting contest for studio time in Engine Studios and recorded an album called I Thought You Were Driving (2007) under the name Lollygag.

After moving to the Bay Area, Burkhard built a small backyard studio and started developing new songs in collaboration with Grzenia in early 2012. While Grzenia was still living in Los Angeles, they used an Internet file sharing site to exchange recordings, sketches and ideas. Turning out nearly a song a month, by the end of 2012, they had enough material to create a digital-only, self-released reunion album called Fondly III, which was released on Christmas Day. This time around Grzenia played all live drum tracks with Burkhard doing all of the singing and playing of Moog and Rhodes. Aside from some guest appearances from Paul Vakselis (bass, guitar) and Jason Vizza (bass), Grzenia and Burkhard took turns adding guitars or bass throughout the album.
