= Rock 'n' Roll Will Never Die =

Studio album by Wesley Willis
- Released: 20 February 1996
- Genre: Alternative rock, outsider, spoken word
- Length: 66:09
- Label: Oglio Records

Wesley Willis chronology
Feel the Power (1996)	Rock 'n' Roll Will Never Die (1996)	Black Light Diner (1996)

Professional ratings
Review scores
Source	Rating
AllMusic	3/5 stars

Rock 'n' Roll Will Never Die is a studio album by the American singer-songwriter Wesley Willis. It was released on 20 February 1996 by Oglio Records, and was the first of Willis' to be released on that label.

== Background ==
Like the rest of Willis' music, each track on the album was recorded with a pre-programmed instrumental played on a keyboard, with Willis talking over it and then singing or yelling the title of the song as the chorus. This album features mainly songs about famous recording artists that Willis liked or saw in concert, including his band. Every song ends with the phrase "Rock over London, rock on Chicago," followed by a random advertising slogan.

== Track listing ==
All tracks are written by Wesley Willis.

No.	Title	Length
1.	"Hootie and the Blowfish"	3:08
2.	"Kurt Cobain"	2:25
3.	"Nirvana"	2:21
4.	"The Rolling Stones"	2:14
5.	"Jello Biafra"	3:01
6.	"Mojo Nixon"	2:08
7.	"Bolt Thrower"	2:14
8.	"Spin Doctors"	3:15
9.	"Dave Grohl"	3:01
10.	"Foo Fighters"	2:59
11.	"Pink Floyd"	2:51
12.	"Blues Traveler"	2:48
13.	"Fugazi"	2:59
14.	"Blackie-O"	2:36
15.	"KRS-1"	2:52
16.	"Morbid Angel"	2:30
17.	"KMFDM"	2:54
18.	"Shonen Knife"	2:30
19.	"Liz Phair"	3:04
20.	"Courtney Love"	2:58
21.	"Jefferson Airplane"	3:09
22.	"Lotion"	2:36
23.	"Dale Meiners"	2:49
24.	"The Wesley Willis Fiasco"	2:47
25.	"Merry Christmas"	2:55
Total length:		66:09

== Personnel ==
- Wesley Willis – vocals, Technics KN1200 programming, production, songwriting
