= The Frogs (band) =

American alternative rock band

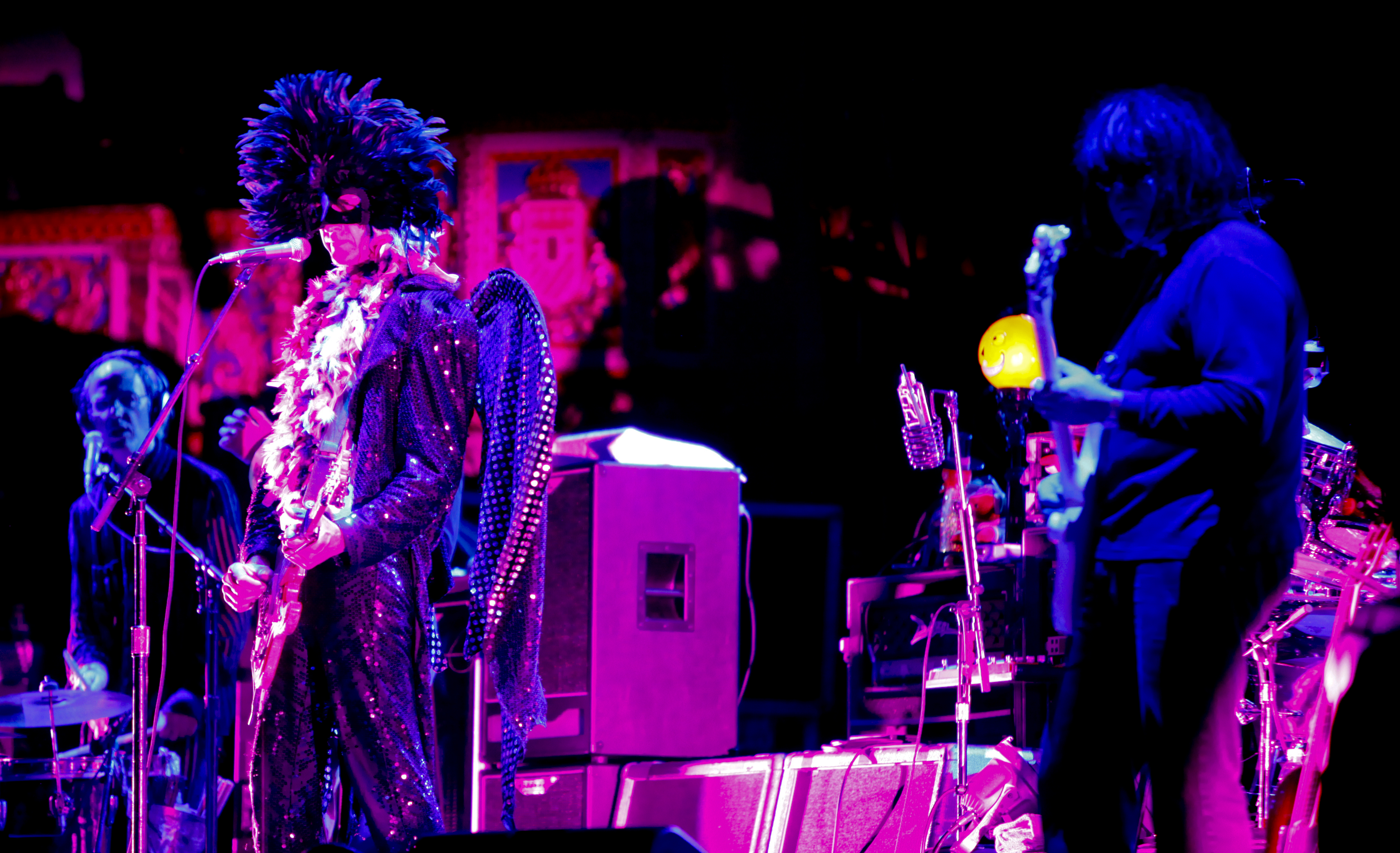
- The Frogs at the Aragon Ballroom (Chicago), December, 2008

Background information
- Also known as: Gila Monsters, Stupid Frogs
- Origin: Milwaukee, Wisconsin, U.S.
- Genres: Alternative rock, lo-fi, folk rock, acoustic rock, comedy rock
- Years active: 1980–present
- Labels: Homestead Records, Matador Records, Scratchie Records, Four Alarm Records
- Members: Jimmy Flemion
- Past members: Dennis Flemion; Jay Tiller; Brian Hill; Damien Strigens; Josh Silverman; John W. Busher; David Geschke

The Frogs are an alternative rock band founded in 1980, in Milwaukee, Wisconsin, by brothers Jimmy and Dennis Flemion. The brothers mainly wrote and performed short, catchy pop songs, but they are also known for their improvised home recordings that are delivered in a comedic style, and often include controversial issues such as race, religion, and sexuality (notably homoeroticism). A history of strife has hindered the band, although a devoted fan base that includes many well-known musicians has supported the group.

== History ==
=== Early years: 1980–1989 ===
Brothers Jimmy Flemion and Dennis Flemion began playing as the "Gila Monsters" and "Stupid Frogs" in 1980, frequenting Milwaukee clubs and coffeehouses. In 1983, bassist Jay Tiller joined the group. That same year, Jimmy began wearing what was to become his trademark stage gimmick, a pair of six-foot bat wings, inspired by the band's set list, which at that time featured many glam rock songs about death and gloom. Soon the brothers also began wearing wigs at their performances, and using pyrotechnics. Hence, "wings and wigs" became synonymous with the band.

Although in their early days the Frogs played mostly in coffeehouses, they developed a larger following due mostly to their fan-friendly shows.

In 1988, Brian Hill joined The Frogs as bassist and would continue to make appearances with the group. That same year saw two significant events related to the Frogs' recording career. The first event was the release of the Frogs' debut self-titled album, which they began recording in 1986. Sources disagree on whether the album was self-released or released by Drag City Records; it is undisputed, however, that only about 1,000 copies were pressed.

The second event ended up bringing the group to public attention: Jay Tiller gave a tape of the Frogs' improvised home recordings to his friend Steve Albini, and the tape eventually made its way to Gerard Cosloy, then head of Homestead Records. Cosloy approached the band and offered to release an album. The Frogs were hoping that Homestead would re-release their first album, but Cosloy wanted to release an LP of the group's improvised home recordings, originally recorded on 4-track reel-to-reel with two microphones, which dealt with over-the-top homoeroticism. Since the tapes had not been intended to be released, the group hedged at first, but eventually they relented, and mixed a 14 track collection of songs. The result was It's Only Right and Natural, The Frogs' second LP, released in 1989. Songs like "Been a Month Since I Had a Man" and "Gather 'Round for Savior No. 2" gave the album (and the band) a unique theme. Homestead announced that the Frogs were leaders in a "new gay supremacy movement," and the media ran with it.

The album was received with mixed reactions; some listeners were ecstatic, while others, who either disliked the subject matter or misunderstood the concept, were not as enthusiastic. In the gay press, writer Adam Block wrote, "I'd find the record a lot more remarkable if I believed the Frogs were actually gay." It's Only Right and Natural was even denounced by Pat Robertson on The 700 Club and a number of conservative religious organizations as proof of Satan's control over the entertainment industry.

=== Grunge and success: 1990–2000 ===
In 1991, the Frogs produced a new album titled Racially Yours, which included songs sung from the point of view of both blacks and whites who find themselves in various race-related situations and predicaments. The lyrics were equally serious and satirical. The Frogs' label Homestead was unwilling to release the album (although the album was distributed freely by fans through bootlegs). It was eventually released in 2000 by the Four Alarm label. The Frogs' further plans for a live album went unfulfilled, as labels they pursued all seemed to be suffering through bankruptcy and management problems. Jay Tiller left the band in 1992, to be replaced by Damian Strigens, although there were several substitutes in the meantime, including such notables as Eddie Roeser from Urge Overkill and Kelley Deal from the Breeders.

In 1994, the Frogs followed Gerard Cosloy to a new label, Matador Records, releasing two singles. They also recorded the EP Starjob, produced by Billy Corgan (who used the pseudonym Johnny Goat); however, the EP wouldn't be released until 1997.

In 1996, Matador released an album of old home-recorded and improvised Frogs material called My Daughter the Broad. It became a fan favorite of the band's material.

In 1997, Starjob was finally released, by Scratchie Records, but the EP almost immediately went out of print when it failed to sell enough units to satisfy the label. Starjob contains well-produced studio tracks, including "Lord Grunge" and one of the most well known Frogs songs, "I Only Play 4 Money."

In 1999, the Frogs covered "Vacation" by the Go-Go's for a tribute album. In that same year, the Four Alarm label issued another LP of the Frogs' old home-recorded and improvised material, called Bananimals. To support these two releases, the Frogs played in Canada for the first time. However, they were stopped at Canadian Customs as officials seized all of their merchandise, declaring it "pornographic." The Frogs had to play their Canadian shows without any merchandise to sell.

The Frogs have gained a cult fan base.

==== Kurt Cobain and Nirvana ====
After meeting Nirvana singer Kurt Cobain in 1993, the Frogs wrote two songs about him and also made him a videotape, Toy Porno. The VHS featured select live performances and stop-motion animation with painted action figures. Action figures and dolls were used as sexually promiscuous characters in various short sketches. The tape became constant viewing material on Nirvana's tour bus. The videotape has since been made available to fans and has become a cult classic.

==== Billy Corgan and The Smashing Pumpkins ====
In 1993, the Smashing Pumpkins' frontman Billy Corgan saw the Frogs at a small club in Madison, Wisconsin, and invited them to open for The Pumpkins. The Frogs were soon opening for Pearl Jam, Mudhoney, Urge Overkill, and other bands who were fans of the group, to mixed reaction.

In the summer of 1994, the Frogs played the second stage at Lollapalooza, with Billy Corgan joining them for their encore of "I Only Play 4 Money" and "Lord Grunge." Corgan continued to support and promote the Frogs by producing a short film, "Meet the Frogs," which he included on the Smashing Pumpkins' 1994 Vieuphoria video compilation.

From August 1996 to February 1997, Dennis Flemion replaced Smashing Pumpkins' recently deceased keyboard player Jonathan Melvoin for the Pumpkins' Infinite Sadness Tour. During each night's encore, Jimmy Flemion performed "1979" (which was influenced by an unreleased Frogs song, "Pleasure") with the Smashing Pumpkins, as well as selecting audience members to dance on stage. The Flemion brothers also appeared on the Smashing Pumpkins' "Tonight, Tonight" single, and sang backing vocals on 1998's Adore.

==== Beck ====
In 1995, Beck used a sample of the Frogs' song "I Don't Care If U Disrespect Me (Just So You Love Me)" on his song "Where It's At", included on his 1996 release Odelay.

==== Eddie Vedder and Pearl Jam ====
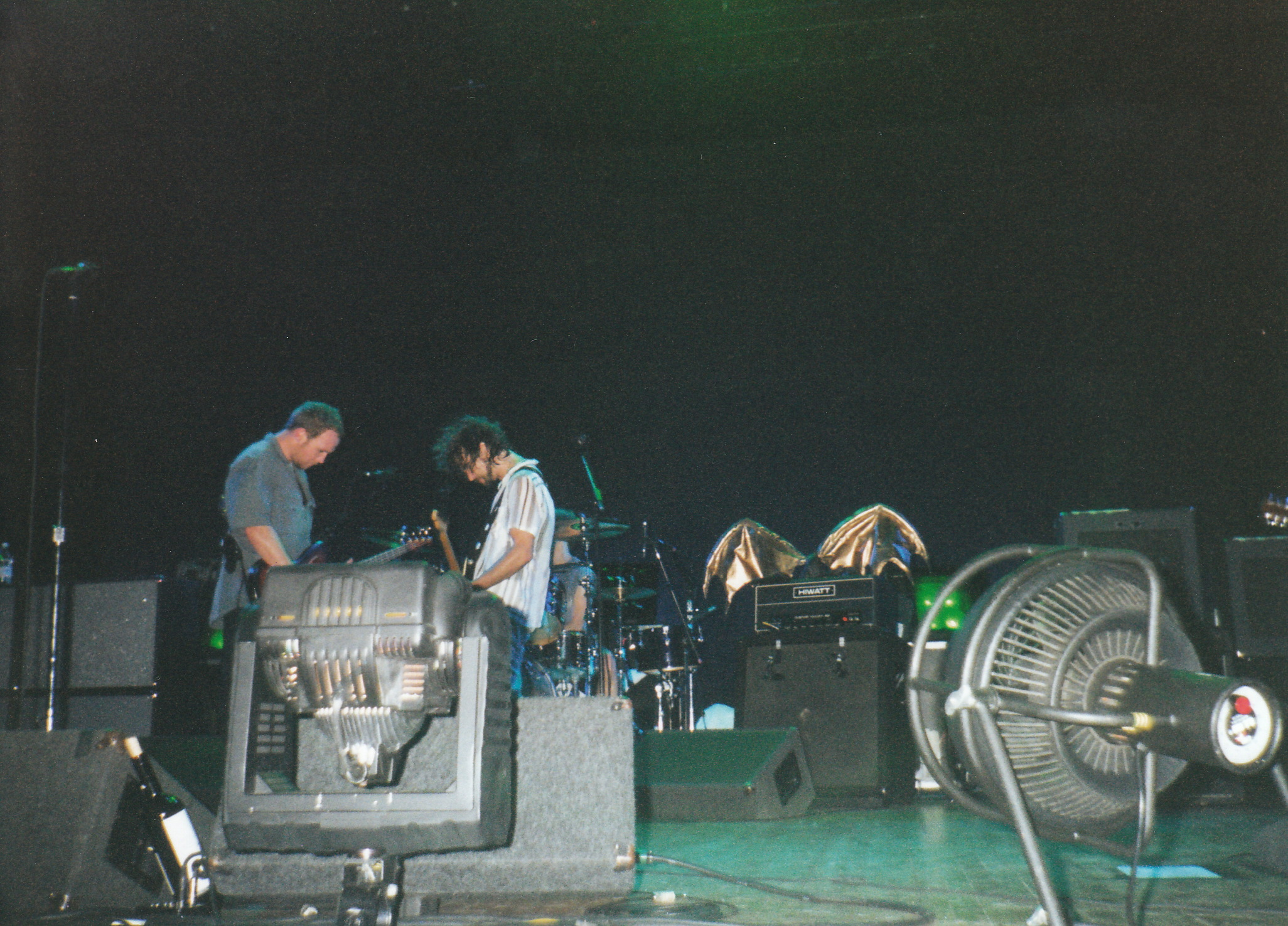
Flemion's bat wings on display at a 2000 Pearl Jam concert

In 1995, Pearl Jam included the Frogs' cover of "Rearviewmirror" (credited to all members of Pearl Jam, but largely written by lead singer Eddie Vedder) as the b-side to their "Immortality" single. The following year, Pearl Jam released a song called "Smile" on their No Code album. According to a story that Vedder told while performing in Milwaukee in 2006, the lyrics of "Smile" were taken directly from a note that Dennis Flemion hid inside Vedder's notebook when Vedder was on stage performing. The words used in the note are taken from the Frogs songs "This Is How I Feel" and "Now I Wanna Be Dead." Vedder told a similar story on Oct. 8, 2000, before performing "Smile" at Alpine Valley Music Theater in East Troy, Wis., although he didn't identify Dennis by name. In the segue between "Daughter" and "Smile," which you can hear on the bootleg from this show, Vedder says, "Someone wrote me a note in my notebook once. He's a good friend of mine. Jeff or Stone wrote this song and they needed words and these words were in this notebook. So every time a copy of 'No Code' is sold, my friend gets like 2/3 of a penny. Which adds up to, well 'No Code,' like $20." Dennis also gave Vedder a small pair of bat wings from the Frogs' early days, and Vedder has proudly displayed them behind his guitar amplifier. The wings reportedly can be seen on the front cover of Pearl Jam's Touring Band 2000.

Eddie Vedder has sung "I Only Play For Money," "Starboy," and "The Longing Goes Away" with the Frogs on more than one occasion, and Pearl Jam played "I Only Play For Money" twice in 1995, although one of the performances was during the soundcheck.

==== Sebastian Bach ====
In 1997, Jimmy Flemion joined Sebastian Bach's touring band. Rather than stripping Flemion of his trademark bat wings, the whole band adopted costumes as well. Flemion also recorded a side project called The Last Hard Men with Bach, Kelley Deal and Jimmy Chamberlin. Bach also performed "Lord Grunge" with the Frogs on an infamous MTV appearance on Oddville. The Frogs destroyed their set and broke several rules set forth by the show's producers, so the producers retaliated by only broadcasting the first verse of the song.

=== 2001-2012 ===
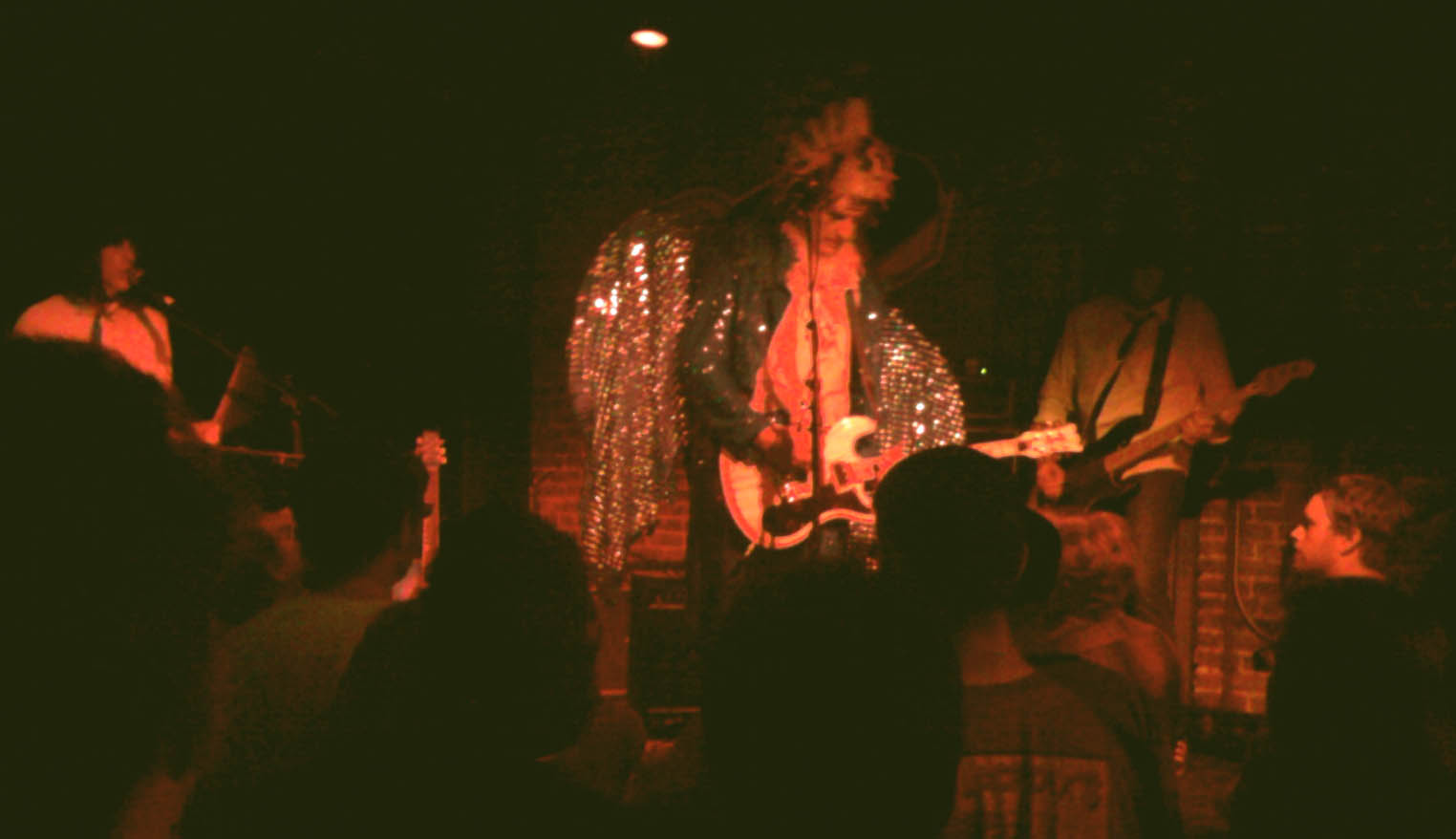
The Frogs performing in Austin, Texas, in 2011

The Frogs' studio effort Hopscotch Lollipop Sunday Surprise was released by Scratchie in 2001. However, Scratchie wasn't happy with the finished album, and they put it out of print after only a few months, just like they had with the previous Starjob EP. Fans were still enthusiastic about the band's Scratchie releases, regardless.

After Damian Strigens exited the band in 1998, past bassists such as Brian Hill and Jay Tiller returned for some appearances, while some new bassists began performing with the band, including Josh Silverman, David Geschke, and John W. Busher. Australian Ben Lee made a special guest appearance on bass in New York City on September 28, 2001.

In 2004, R.T. Rybak, mayor of Minneapolis, crowd-surfed at a Frogs concert at First Avenue, a popular nightclub in the Twin Cities, fulfilling a promise made earlier in the summer when the club temporarily closed due to financial difficulties.

The group played a 25th anniversary concert at the Cactus Club in Milwaukee in 2005. Flemion opened the show by singing "Now You Know You're Black" from Racially Yours. One attendee noted, "[I]t was a successful fiasco once again... Jimmy is really cute when he wears the bear hat as part of his costume."

On November 13, 2007, Flemion performed with the Smashing Pumpkins at The Backyard in Austin, Texas. The Frogs would later open for the Pumpkins on December 7, 2008, in Chicago.

In 2009, the Frogs were part of the lineup for UK 2009 Weekend Two, curated by The Breeders, of the All Tomorrow's Parties music festival. The band was chosen by Animal Collective to perform the album It's Only Right & Natural in its entirety at the All Tomorrow's Parties festival in May 2011.

In December 2011, two new studio albums were announced via Flemion's Twitter account, entitled Count Yer Blessingz and Squirrel Bunny Juniper Deluxe. The albums were released on iTunes and Spotify on July 5, 2012.

On July 7, 2012, Dennis went missing at Wind Lake in Racine, Wisconsin. His body was recovered from the water on the evening of July 10. His death was ruled an accidental drowning.

=== 2013-present ===
In the wake of Dennis Flemion's death, Eddie Vedder wrote "Future Days", which was released in 2013 on the Pearl Jam album, Lightning Bolt. Jimmy announced on the band's Facebook page that the band would continue despite Dennis' passing. On July 7, 2017, Jimmy played a tribute show to Dennis at the Barracuda in Austin, Texas. A final album was announced plus talks of a potential documentary.

For its 30th anniversary in 2019, It’s Only Right and Natural was reissued on End Of All Music. The vinyl reissue features remixed and remastered audio of the original album (the original album was accidentally pressed in mono when released in 1989) and comes housed in a gatefold sleeve with newly added artwork (plus track-by-track liner notes and intro by Flemion).

In November 2019, the Frogs announced a short tour consisting of Flemion on guitar and Evan Dando (of the Lemonheads) on drums.

As a follow-up to 2019's reissue of It's Only Right and Natural, the Frogs released 1st on April 3, 2020. Recorded during January 1986, the album, also known as Pat's Session, was intended to be the initial release for the band prior to The Frogs 1988 self-titled debut. Minneapolis based Twin/Tone Records approached The Frogs and expressed fawning interest, extending an invitation to record the band after seeing them live in 1985. Dennis opted not to release due to the overabundance of reverb. Throughout the years, the discussion would persist from other sources on pursuing to fix the reverb on 1st. Thirty-two years later, Flemion would take the recordings to a Portland, Oregon recording studio to remaster in 2018. The studio engineer successfully cleaned-up and removed the excess reverb.

On February 14, 2020, Flemion confirmed on the Frogs' Facebook page that a documentary on the band is in the works.

In 2021, a "final" album, Damaged Goods / Sinned in Reverse was released digitally. 2022 saw an expanded version of their debut album and an alternate version of Hopscotch Lollipop Sunday Surprise. The following year, a reissue of an early demo release, Death Songs, was released onto streaming services for its 40th anniversary. It was followed by 1980, a collection of demos recorded in 1980. Expanded and alternate versions of the Starjob EP, entitled Starjob + and Starjob ?, rounded out the year's releases. In 2024, Flemion announced he would be releasing a series of live versions of the band's material, beginning with Rare, focusing on live shows between 1980 and 1984, through Well Done, which focused between 2000 and 2006. Later that year, a deluxe version of Racially Yours, entitled Racially Mine, was released. 2025 saw the release of Out of the Missed, a recording of their final show before Denis Flemion's death, at Emo's in 2011.

== Discography ==
=== Albums ===
- The Frogs (1988)
- It's Only Right and Natural (1989)
- My Daughter the Broad (1996)
- Starjob (1997)
- Bananimals (1999)
- Racially Yours (2000)
- Hopscotch Lollipop Sunday Surprise (2001)
- Squirrel Bunny Jupiter Deluxe (2012)
- Count Yer Blessingsz (2012)
- 1st (2020)
- Damaged Goods / Sinned in Reverse (2021)
- 1980 (2023)

=== Live albums ===
- CBGayB/Tour de Gay (1989)
- Rare (2024)
- Medium-Rare (2024)
- Medium (2024)
- Medium-Well (2024)
- Well Done (2024)
- Out of the Missed (2025)
- Racially Yours (Live)

=== Singles ===
- Now You Know You're Black / Adam + Steve (1994)
- Here Comes Santa's Pussy (1995)
- Christmas Minus Mama (2023)
- Christmas in New York - 2002-12-20 Knitting Factory, New York City NY (Live) (2024)

==== Split Singles ====
- Immortality/Rearviewmirror (With Pearl Jam) (1995)
- The Wesley Willis Fiasco/The Frogs (With The Wesley Willis Fiasco) (1996)

=== Video ===
- ’’Toy Porno’’ (1993)

=== Demo releases ===
Prior to releasing their debut album, the band self-released several demos in very limited numbers. Some songs appearing on these early releases were later re-recorded, but many stayed exclusive. This continued after their debut release, as demo versions of future releases were often given out at shows or given out through their mailing list.

- Death Songs (1983, later released in 2023)
- Tape #2 (1984)
- Pat's Session (1986)
- 1st LP Outtakes (1987)
- Made Up Cassette A (1987)
- Made Up Cassette B (1987)
- Made Up Cassette C (1987)
- Made Up Cassette D (1987)
- Made Up Cassette E (1987)
- Made Up Reel #1, 6 (1987)
- Made Up Reel #2, 3, 4 (1987)
- Made Up Reel #5, 7, 9 (1987)
- Made Up Reel #6, 8 (1987)
- Made Up Reel #10, 11, 12 (1987)
- Made Up Reel #13, 14, 15 (1987)
- Racially Yours (1991, later released in 2024)
- Death Songs Outtakes
- Made Up Songs
- Made Up Songs 1/4
- Made Up Songs 1/2
- Made Up Songs #10, 11, 12
- Made Up Songs #13, 14, 15
- Jim's Songs
- Jim's Songs #2
- MPLS 8-31-85 +
- Jingle Bunny

=== Compilation appearances ===
- Night of the Living Dead (1993, Massacre at Central Hi Records)
- Bruce Lee, Heroin, and the Punk Scene (1993, Massacre at Central Hi Records)
- Punk Rock X-Mas (1995, Rhino Records)
- What's Up Matador? (1997, Matador Records)
- Too Much Scratchie Makes You Itch (1997, Scratchie Records)
- CMJ Sampler (1997, Mercury)
- Buceadora CD1 (1997, Grabaciones En El Mar)
- Live Music From a Dead Campus (1998, WFMU)
- Unsealed: A Tribute to The Go-Go's (1999, 4 Alarm Records)
- The Record Shop - 30 Years of Rough Trade Shops (2006, V2)
- Play/Pause/Stop: From Cassette To Cart - A Brief History of the Local Tape Culture at WMSE (2006)
- Sidewalk Songs & City Stories - New Urban Folk (2007, Trikont)
