= Toy Porno =

- Starring: Dennis Flemion; Jimmy Flemion; Jay Tiller; Brian "Beezer" Hill; Brian T. Komar
- Music by: The Frogs
- Distributed by: Self-released
- Release date: October 1993
- Running time: 122 minutes
- Country: United States
- Language: English

Toy Porno (also known as Toy P) is a self-released experimental art film by The Frogs. The amateur videotape was compiled in October 1993, as a gift for Kurt Cobain. It would soon become frequent viewing material on the Nirvana tour bus, and later on the Foo Fighters tour bus as well. Later, after generated copies began circulating amongst fans, the band began selling VHS copies at shows. The band has expressed their interest in re-issuing the film on DVD for many years, though it has not been finalized yet, as they want to digitally remaster the compilation from the original recordings and the lack of funds to do so has proven a major obstacle.. Despite this, the reissue has been requested and anticipated by fans for years, which the band has honored by releasing a high quality rip from the original VHS as an AVI file, which is available for download online.

The title of the film refers to several short film sketches that feature action figures, dolls and knick-knack toys having adult conversations and performing sexual acts. The shorts sometimes use stop-motion animation. Mingled within the shorts are home videos and concert performances that include many cover songs played in a joking and spontaneous manners.

== Sketches ==
In the Brian T. Komar Interview, Jimmy Flemion rants about the Patti Smith song, "25th Floor", satirically calling it "23rd Floor", to which the interviewer responds by proposing the interviewee is on drugs.

In Pony Killer (Bagism), the brothers Flemion use the Lennon/Ono "trash bag" technique on a young Asian girl, referring to her as "Yoko".

During a live performance of "I've Got Drugs (Out of the Mist)", Dennis Flemion berates a bumbling soundman, famously singing, "you are not getting paid tonight!"

== Video order (track listing) ==
- 1. "Easy to Be Hard"† (Intro) (June 1982)
- 2. Animal Adventure #1
- 3. "Someone's Pinning Me to the Ground" (Milwaukee, 27 February 1992)
- 4. Animal Adventure #2
- 5. "Here Comes My Girl"† (Garage 1980)
- 6. Animal Adventure #3
- 7. "Mr. Right" (Milwaukee, 22 August 1991)
- 8. Animal Adventure #4
- 9. "Satan's in the Manger"
- 10. "Jesus Book #1-3"
- 11. "He's the Prince" (Minneapolis, 28 October 1984)
- 12. Over the Flames
- 13. "Been a Year Since I Had a Boy" (Living Room Tapes, 22 February 1988)
- 14. Dinosaurs Must Eat
- 15. "I've Got Drugs (Out of the Mist)" (Milwaukee, 1 November 1988)
- 16. T. Rex Sex
- 17. "Blues Jam"/"Hot Cock Annie" (Madison, 1 October 1988)
- 18. Toy Dog w/ Dinosaur Background
- 19. "White Rabbit"† (Milwaukee, 18 August 1989)
- 20. T.V. Nightmare
- 21. "I'm a Strolling Minstrel"
- 22. Brian T. Komar Interview Pt.1
- 23. Covers Medley (Milwaukee, 18 February 1989):
  - a. "Nightmares"†
  - b. "Every Rose Has Its Thorn"†
  - c. "Immigrant Song"†
  - d. "Birthday"†
  - e. "Stand"† / "Hang on Sloopy"† / "La Bondage"† ("La Bamba")
  - f. "Winchester Cathedral"†
- 24. Camping Trip #1
- 25. Camping Trip #2
- 26. "Yesterday"† (June 1982)
- 27. "I Don't Care If U Disrespect Me (Just So You Love Me)" (Philadelphia, 13 December 1991)
- 28. Pony Killer (Bagism)
- 29. "These Are the Finest Queen Boys (I've Ever Seen)" (Chicago, 11 April 1992)
- 30. "These Are the Finest Queen Boys (I've Ever Seen)" (Milwaukee, 27 February 1992)
- 31. "Smells Like Teen Spirit"/"Territorial Pissings"† (Milwaukee, 27 February 1992)
- 32. "Territorial Pissings"† (Chicago, 1 February 1992)
- 33. "When Doves Cry"† (Minneapolis, 21 August 1984)
- 34. Segment from the John Ankerberg Show ("Gather 'Round for Savior #2")
- 35. Clown of Thorns (Louisville, 9 August 1993)
- 36. "Easy to be Hard (Reprise)"† (June 1982)

† denotes cover song.

== Soundtrack ==
Music from Toy Porno (later released on CD as Sad Bits and More Sad Bits) is a self-released soundtrack, chiefly composed of piano instrumentals.

=== Side A ===
1. the angry heavens
2. poisoning strangers
3. the first in a series of disasters
4. waltzing on a window ledge
5. lost in a snowstorm
6. lullaby
7. paper clouds
8. blue sunflowers
9. black-eyed sparrow
10. feathers in bloom
11. forbidden
12. a marriage of arrows
13. lasting kisses
14. cautious lovers
15. returning light
16. living in a house of secrets
17. burning the wedding invitations
18. tower of cowards
19. pledging his devotion to her (always)
20. spellbound
21. saddle down whinny will ya
22. the man you want wears cuckoo fur

=== Side B ===
1. waking lions
2. ascending stairs
3. exiled
4. twilight fears no wolf
5. opening windows
6. whirling in a dying room
7. two hearts parting
8. the mist that missed its mark
9. when rain reigns
10. the longing
11. the begging
12. the queen's escort
13. stairs go ech, ech, echoing on
14. the danger in shadows calling
15. children of deflowerland
16. le grande display of sorrow
17. the scolding mildly
18. Russia in tears
19. king stranger's court
20. if there ever was light
21. palace the ball on the tip of your foes
22. song for janice

== See also ==
- Vieuphoria
- Broken

== Notes ==
- https://web.archive.org/web/20081011193950/http://www.thefrogsarchive.com/store/toyporno.html
- https://web.archive.org/web/20081203162732/http://www.thefrogsarchive.com/self-released/toyp-music.html
- http://www.thefuton.com/frogs/discog.txt
- https://web.archive.org/web/20071107065647/http://www.thefrogsarchive.com/collection/videos/toy-porno/insert.jpg
