= Fulflej =

American alternative rock band

Fulflej was an alternative rock band from Richmond, Virginia, United States, formed in 1992 by guitarist/vocalist Jason Greschke, bassist Andre Phillips, and drummer Matt Nelson. In 1995, they were signed to Scratchie Records whose releases came to be distributed by Mercury Records beginning in 1996.

== Biography ==
The band evolved from two previous incarnations, the first being The Un-Ones with Jason Greschke, Andre Phillips, and drummer Malcom Vaughn, hailing from Hampton, VA and formed in 1986. The Un-Ones was followed by the band Rhithm Lyd, formed in 1990 with Greschke, Katie Power on bass, and Phil Searcy on drums. In the summer of 1990, Greschke moved to Richmond, VA to attend Virginia Commonwealth University. During breaks, he would return to Hampton where Rhithm Lyd continued with Power and Searcy. Phillips moved back to Hampton after a temporary move to Italy, and replaced Power as bass player in 1991. Phillips joined Greschke in Richmond soon after, and Rhithm Lyd became Fulflej in 1992 with the addition of drummer Matt Nelson.

Soon after being discovered by Kerry Brown of Catherine and D'arcy Wretzky of The Smashing Pumpkins, they were signed to the newly-formed independent record label Scratchie Records, co-founded in 1995 by Brown, Wretzky, and Pumpkins guitarist James Iha (among others). Fulflej's Scratchie releases include the 7-inch "Work In This Universe" b/w "Parallel To Gravity", the EP "The Microwave EP", and the LP Wack-Ass Tuba Riff. A video produced for the single "Work In This Universe" aired on MTV's 120 Minutes. Wack-Ass Tuba Riff, released in October 1996, was the first ever Scratchie/Mercury release. James Iha and D'arcy Wretzky co-produced and performed on Wack-Ass Tuba Riff.

Mercury Records, who were to distribute the soundtrack for the Power Rangers movie sequel, Turbo: A Power Rangers Movie, invited Fulflej to write and record the theme song for the movie. The resulting track "Shift Into Turbo" was featured in the movie and on the soundtrack, both released in 1997. The members of Fulflej were also featured performing the song in the TV trailers for the film. The instrumental for "Shift Into Turbo" was taken largely from the song "Not A Dream 2" from the "Funny Things Shine" demo.

In 1998, Nelson retired from the band and was replaced with drummer Ron Lowder. In 1999, Fulflej recorded an additional Scratchie LP, "To Keep A Long Story Long...", though it was never released other than by the band members themselves over the internet after Fulflej had disbanded in 2000.

== Musical style ==
Fulflej has been described as alternative rock, power-pop, "mid-'90s semi-alt-rock with what sure sounds like inspiration from early-'90s shoegazing", and "influenced as much by hip-hop as they were punk". Vocalist Jason Greschke is said to have "a much more breathy, whispery way around singing" and "a unique voice that sounds pleasingly strained. It is the type of voice that twists syllables around so that even covers such as "Nothing Compares 2 U" sound distinctly original". Phillips said "Someone called us nerd punk, or we could be grunge light"; Greschke described the band's music as "intense progressive with a groove rhythm."

== Discography ==
- Funny Things Shine (cassette demo) (1993)
- How to Turn Household Pets Into Easter Bunnies (cassette demo) (1994)
- "Work In This Universe" b/w "Parallel To Gravity" (7-inch vinyl single) (1995)
- The Microwave EP (5-track EP, CD only) (1995)
- Wack-Ass Tuba Riff (12-track LP, CD & cassette) (1996)
- Shift Into Turbo (soundtrack single) (1997)
- To Keep a Long Story Long... (12-track LP, internet release only) (1999)

== Members ==
Sources:

- Jason Greschke/MC No Joke G/Jae Senji – vocals, guitar (1992–2000)
- Andre "Auggie" Phillips/Andre Fill-ups/Awn Drapey – bass (1992–2000)
- Matthew Nelson/Maff-yoo Nillsun/Matt Thuin – drums (1992–1998)
- Ron Lowder Jr./Ron O'Dell – drums (1998–2000)
