= Office (band) =

American pop band

- Origin: Chicago, Illinois; Kalamazoo, Michigan
- Genres: Rock, pop, indie rock, psychedelic, electronic
- Years active: 2000–2008
- Labels: Quack!Media; Former label - Scratchie Records; New Line Records
- Members: Scott Masson - guitar, vocals, piano Erica Corniel - drums, vocals Justin Petertil - piano, keys, vocals, and percussion Tom Smith - guitar, vocals Colin DeKuiper - bass
- Past members: Alissa Noonan-Hacker - bass Jessica Gonyea - synth, percussion, and vocals Jamison Harper - bari sax, flute John D. Martin III - tenor sax, accordion Brad Miner - bass Toby Worscheck - drums, drum machine

Office is a Chicago-based pop band that was active in the 2000s and went on hiatus in 2009.

== History ==
The band was founded by Scott Masson while attending College of Goldsmiths in London. Upon returning to America after his student exchange program ended, Masson continued to use Office as a vehicle for his songwriting and art at Kalamazoo College in Kalamazoo, Michigan. Masson maintained the band with various friends and performers as collaborators, preferring to call it a "project" or "hallucination". The latest iteration of the project appeared onstage at SXSW, on MTV, at Lollapalooza, and elsewhere dressed as if going to work in "business attire and black mini dresses".

Office developed a cult following in the 2000s, particularly in and around Kalamazoo, Michigan and later in Chicago, Illinois, promoting a sound that has been described by Spin as "handclaps and sunny harmonies". Masson recorded and self-released the debut Office album under his own publishing company, Public Treatments, and began promoting it in Kalamazoo in 2001. At its peak, he said people were coming to his house at 2 a.m. asking for a copy. In 2004, Masson recruited guitarist Tom Smith, bassist Alissa Noonan-Hacker, and drummer Erica Corniel to the band.

In 2006, the band was performing shows at South by Southwest music festival, CMJ, Mobfest, Midwest Music Conference, a set at Lollapalooza. In October that year, the group signed with Scratchie Records, an independent label owned by James Iha, former guitarist of the Smashing Pumpkins.

The band's first album under the Scratchie label, A Night at the Ritz, was released on September 25, 2007. The album contains both previously unreleased and older material from the group's early records. It also includes the singles from Q&A, which were remastered, remixed, and reproduced for commercial release by the label. By the time A Night At The Ritz was released, many of the audience and critical reactions were mediocre or mixed. Office produced a music video for the song "Oh My", which was featured on MTV in 2007. When bassist Alissa Noonan Hacker left the group in 2007, she was replaced by Chicago-based indie artist and friend of Masson's from Kalamazoo College, Justin Petertil. He was later succeeded by Colin DeKuiper from the popular instrumental band, Russian Circles, until the band's hiatus in late 2008.

Following the completion of the album Mecca in late 2008, Masson moved to the Detroit area to be near his family, and was treated for depression and post-traumatic stress disorder from his experiences in the music industry. This marked the start of an indefinite hiatus for Office. Masson eventually made a full recovery, and began recording and performing experimental music around the mid-west under his own name, and occasionally with a group called Glossies. He resides in Ferndale, Michigan, where he works full-time as a producer, engineer, and creative consultant for artists, musicians, and ad agencies around the Detroit area. He also paints.

Office signed with Ann Arbor-based media conglomerate Quack!Media in January 2009, releasing "Mecca" on limited-edition vinyl and digital download. The band made the album available for free via the internet.

The song "Ridiculous Plans" was included in the teen indie film "The Virginity Hit". Office's song 'Dominoes' was included on the indie compilation in August 2009. The song "Enter Me, Exit You" was licensed by Abercrombie & Fitch, and Hollister Co. stores across the US and UK. In 2017, Scott Masson removed Office songs from all streaming services. They were replaced with remixed/remastered versions in 2020.

== Members and Collaborators ==
Members and collaborators include: Scott Masson, Alissa Noonan, Tom Smith, Jessica Gonyea, Justin Petertil, Erica Corniel, Jamie Harper, John D. Martin III, Brad Miner, Toby Worscheck, Jen Collier, Colin DeKuiper, Jody Weinmann, Thea Nichols, Sara Jean Stevens, Shawn Rios, Jackie Phillips, Kip Donlon, Jeremy Freer, Jeffrey Freer, Alex Merz, Ayinde Zuri

== Discography ==
=== Albums ===
==== Office (2001) ====
1. "Traffic Jams"
2. "Cash/Money Killionaire"
3. "Paint the City and Faces With Yellow"
4. "Squeeze the Distance"
5. "Bizmox"
6. "Gas Mask"
7. "Wireless"
8. "The Program"
9. "Toy Piano"
10. "Cakeheads"
11. "Message Machine"

==== The Ice Tea Boys and the Lemonade Girls (2002) ====
1. "Loverdriver"
2. "Plus/Minus Fairytale"
3. "Weathermaker"
4. "Superfoolfantastic"
5. "Reaching For A Laser Beam"
6. "Company Calls"
7. "Bar Yellow"
8. "And You're So..."
9. "The Ice Tea Boys and the Lemonade Girls"
10. "Until I Find You..."
11. "Mosquito"

==== Glass Corvette [unreleased] (2004) ====
1. "Introduction"
2. "Q & A"
3. "Glass Corvette"
4. "The Remedy"
5. "Poor Rich"
6. "Into Your Network"
7. "Wicker Park Party!"
8. "Reality TV Show"
9. "Busy With Other Things"
10. "Until 6PM..."
11. "Suburban Perfume"
12. "Good Cops"
13. "Twelve Months"
14. "Pulmonary Lounge"

==== Q&A (2005) ====
1. "Wound Up"
2. "Oh My"
3. "The Big Bang Jump!"
4. "If You Don't Know By Now"
5. "Busy With Other Things"
6. "Q&A"
7. "Until 6PM"
8. "Not Her Style"
9. "Ordinary Offices, Extraordinary Proposals"
10. "Had a Visit"
11. "Dominos"
12. "Possibilities"

==== A Night at the Ritz (2007) ====
1. "Oh My"
2. "If You Don't Know by Now"
3. "The Ritz"
4. "Company Calls"
5. "Wound Up"
6. "The Big Bang Jump"
7. "Plus Minus Fairytale"
8. "Paralyzed Prince"
9. "Had a Visit"
10. "Q&A"
11. "Dominoes"
12. "Possibilities"
13. "Suburban Perfume"
14. "Walking the Cow" (iTunes only bonus track)

==== Mecca (2009) ====
1. "Sticky Dew"
2. "Nobody Knows You"
3. "Ridiculous Plans"
4. "Enter Me, Exit You"
5. "Dr. Drako"
6. "Sleepwalking"
7. "Everything You've Witnessed"
8. "Trainwreck DJs"
9. "Double Penetrate the Market"
10. "Aphrodisiac Missiles"
11. "The Silent Parade"
