= My Daughter the Broad =

Studio album by The Frogs
- Released: June 4, 1996
- Recorded: 1986–1995
- Genre: Alternative rock, spoken word
- Length: 49:30
- Label: Matador Records
- Producer: The Frogs

The Frogs chronology
It's Only Right and Natural (1989)	My Daughter the Broad (1996)	Starjob (1997)

My Daughter the Broad is the third Studio Album by the American band the Frogs, released in 1996. It is a compilation of improvised homemade recordings that were mostly recorded in the late 1980s. Many of the songs continue themes from It's Only Right and Natural, such as homosexual supremacy and social conservative fears.

The album introduces two new personas of Dennis Flemion, with distinct-sounding voices, a geriatric pervert and the high-pitched murderer Jack, as in the songs "Reelin' and Rockin #1" and "I'm Evil, Jack." Fans often request songs from the album in concert, but the band refuses to play some of them because of the difficulties involved with re-creating an improvisation in a live setting. The title was inspired by Mudhoney's My Brother the Cow.

== Critical reception ==
Professional ratings
Review scores
Source	Rating
AllMusic	4/5 stars
NME	2/10
Pitchfork Media	6.5/10

Magnet wrote that the album "confounded and titillated with tunes about male and female sexual deviances, study-hall pervert mutilation, molestation fantasies and other songs that raised eyebrows yet made no sense ... one of the funniest albums ever made."

== Track listing ==
All tracks are written by The Frogs.

My Daughter the Broad track listing
No.	Title	Length
1.	"Reelin' and Rockin #1"	3:53
2.	"Children, Run Away (The Man with the Candy)"	2:03
3.	"Where's Jerry Lewis"	1:32
4.	"I'm Evil, Jack"	2:45
5.	"April Fools (He Had the Change Done at the Shop)"	4:08
6.	"The Boys with the Boys"	2:38
7.	"I'm Sad the Goat Just Died Today"	1:14
8.	"Gwendolyn Macrae"	2:42
9.	"Put Your Finger in the Dike, Stop the Leak"	2:45
10.	"God Is Gay"	2:56
11.	"I Love U (You Know I Don't)"	2:03
12.	"Stand Up for Your Rights (Or Sit Down)"	2:08
13.	"Lifeguard of Love"	2:25
14.	"I'm Hungry"	2:09
15.	"Banjo Bonnie"	1:45
16.	"Which One of You Gave My Daughter the Dope?"	1:42
17.	"Candyland Joe"	1:42
18.	"I Had a Second Change Done at the Shop (Now I've Added Animal Cocks)"	3:33
19.	"Who's Sucking on Grampa's Balls Since Grandma Ain't Home Tonight?"	0:11
20.	"Grandma's Sitting in the Corner with a Penis in Her Hand Going 'No, No, No, No, No'"	2:20
21.	"Dreambox"	2:04
22.	"Reelin' and Rockin' #2"	2:53
Total length:		49:30

== Personnel ==
- Jimmy Flemion - Guitars, Bass, Cello, Keyboards, Vocals
- Dennis Flemion - Drums, Keyboards, Vocals
- Jay Tiller - Bass
- Scott LaBerge - Cello
