= Spookydisharmoniousconflicthellride =

Studio album by The Wesley Willis Fiasco
- Released: 1996
- Genres: Hardcore punk; hard rock; grunge; alternative metal; alternative rock; punk rock
- Label: Urban Legends
- Producer: Steve Albini

Singles from Spookydisharmoniousconflicthellride
- 1. "Pop That Pussy / Rockstar" Released: 1995 (Note: Split Single with Octapussy.); 2. "All You Need / Get On The Bus" Released: 1996 (Note: Split Single with Sublime.)

Professional ratings
Review scores
| Source | Rating |
|---|---|
| AllMusic | 2/5 stars |

Spookydisharmoniousconflicthellride (Spooky Disharmonious Conflict Hellride) is the only studio album by Chicago-based punk band the Wesley Willis Fiasco. It was produced by Steve Albini and released in 1996 through Urban Legends Records with distribution through Unity Label Group.

== Track listing ==
1. Get On The Bus
2. I'm Doing It Well On The Side Of The Rea
3. Pop That Pussy
4. Casper The Homosexual Friendly Ghost
5. I Can't Drive
6. He's Doing Time In Jail
7. The Bar Is Closed
8. Jesus Is The Answer
9. Blood, Guts & Fire Trucks
10. She Loves Me Truly
11. Drink That Whiskey
12. Steve Albini
13. Steve Albini Reprise
14. I'm Sorry That I Got Fat
