= Wesley Willis Fiasco =

American punk rock band

The Wesley Willis Fiasco
- The Wesley Willis Fiasco in 1996; (L–R): Pat Barnard, Dave Nooks, Wesley Willis, Dale Meiners and Brendan Murphy

Background information
- Origin: Chicago, Illinois, U.S.
- Genres: Hardcore punk, punk rock, hard rock, alternative metal, alternative rock, grunge, outsider
- Years active: 1991–1996
- Labels: Urban Legend, Sympathy for the Record Industry
- Past members: Wesley Willis; Pat Barnard; Dale Meiners; Dave Nooks; Brendan Murphy; Michael Cates

The Wesley Willis Fiasco was an American punk rock band based in Wicker Park, Chicago, Illinois, United States, led by Wesley Willis.

== History ==
The band was formed by Wesley Willis on vocals, Pat Barnard on lead guitar, and his friend Dale Meiners on guitar and bass. Dale Meiners previously played guitar in Billy Corgan's pre-Smashing Pumpkins band, the Marked. In 1992 Willis began writing songs, and soon after, Meiners took Willis into his studio to record them. After many drummer changes, Meiners, Barnard and Willis formed the Wesley Willis Fiasco with Dave Nooks on bass and Brendan Murphy on drums. Their name was coined by early second guitarist Michael Cates.

They released only one studio album in 1996, Spookydisharmoniousconflicthellride (a reference to Willis's description of his schizophrenic episodes), which is found on the Urban Legend label. Various live albums are available, though most are bootlegs. After the band broke up, Willis continued to record his own solo albums. One of his songs on his solo album "Rock 'n' Roll Will Never Die" is about the Fiasco.

The Fiasco band covered the song "Girls on Film" by Duran Duran, which appeared on the Duran Duran Tribute Album in 1997. They also released a much sought after and hard to find 7" vinyl split with Sublime, as well as a split with Milwaukee's The Frogs.

The Fiasco toured with many bands, most notably Rocket from the Crypt, Sublime, and Lordz of Brooklyn. The band was also noted for charming Eddie Vedder, lead singer of Pearl Jam.

Due to conflicts between the Fiasco band's shows and Willis's solo keyboard shows, the band broke up while on tour in Ohio in 1996. Willis stated that the demons in his head worsened, causing him to constantly yell at the band unintentionally.

After the breakup, Pat Barnard sold his equipment and moved to Lake Tahoe, where he died in a drowning accident at the age of 27. Murphy, who briefly played with The Jesus Lizard, lives in Chicago, working for an indie label. Dale Meiners builds custom furniture. Dave Nooks got married and was a member of the Chicago-based punk and roll band The Symptoms for a time. Willis continued his solo career until his death from leukemia in 2003, age 40.

== Band members ==
- Wesley Willis (deceased) — vocals
- Dale Meiners — guitar, bass guitar
- Pat Barnard (deceased) — guitar
- Dave Nooks — bass guitar
- Brendan Murphy — drums

== Discography ==
Albums

- Spookydisharmoniousconflicthellride (Studio Album) (1996)
- Live EP (Extended play) (2001)

Split Singles

- Pop That Pussy / Rockstar (With Octapussy) (1995)
- The Frogs / Wesley Willis (With The Frogs) (1996)
- All You Need / Get On The Bus (With Sublime) (1996)
- Pop That Pussy / Chicks Can't Rock! (With Varment) (1997)
