= Scratchie Records =

Independent record label

Scratchie Records was an independent record label founded in 1995 by James Iha and D'arcy Wretzky of The Smashing Pumpkins, Adam Schlesinger (Fountains of Wayne, Ivy), Kerry Brown (Catherine) and Jeremy Freeman.

Initially, Scratchie was based in Chicago and had a three-year distribution agreement with Mercury Records made in mid-1996, but a year of legal wrangling ended the pact after Universal merged with Mercury's parent company, PolyGram. Scratchie then moved to New York City and signed a deal with New Line. The end of the partnership with Mercury affected records such as Dan Bryk's Lovers Leap, ultimately released by Scratchie in 2001. Scratchie has released records as recently as 2008 (Midnight Movies' "Nights EP").

== Selected artists ==
- Eszter Balint
- The Blank Theory
- Blaze
- Dan Bryk
- Catherine
- Chainsaw Kittens
- Fondly
- Fountains of Wayne
- The Frogs
- Fulflej
- Albert Hammond Jr.
- Mike Ladd
- Midnight Movies
- Office
- Robbers on High Street
- The Sights
- The Sounds
- Pancho Kryztal

== See also ==
- List of record labels
