= Dennis Flemion =

American independent rock percussionist

- Born: June 6, 1955
- Died: July 7, 2012 (aged 57) Racine County, Wisconsin, U.S.
- Genres: Rock
- Instruments: Percussion, keyboards
- Formerly of: The Frogs; The Smashing Pumpkins (touring hire only)

Dennis Flemion (June 6, 1955 – July 7, 2012) was a founding member, with his younger brother Jimmy, of the controversial independent rock band the Frogs. He was the primary percussionist for the band and was also a temporary member of the Smashing Pumpkins from 1996 to 1997, filling in on live keyboards following the death of Jonathan Melvoin. The Flemion brothers also appeared on "Medellia of the Gray Skies" on the band's single for "Tonight, Tonight". On Adore, the brothers backed vocals for "To Sheila" and "Behold! The Night-Mare".

On July 7, 2012, Flemion accidentally drowned while swimming in a lake in Racine County, Wisconsin. He was 57. The 2013 Pearl Jam song "Future Days" was written by his friend Eddie Vedder about his death.
