= Welcome to the Future (disambiguation) =

"Welcome to the Future" is a 2009 country music song by Brad Paisley.

Welcome to the Future may refer to:

- "Welcome to the Future" (The Future Is Wild episode), an episode of the television series The Future Is Wild
- Welcome to the Future (festival), an underground music festival held annually in the Netherlands
- Welcome to the Future (album), a 2025 album by Swedish band H.E.A.T
- Welcome to the Future (video game), a 1995 video game developed by Blue Sky Entertainment
