= Force Majeure (H.E.A.T album) =

Studio album by H.E.A.T
- Released: 5 August 2022
- Genre: Hard rock, arena rock
- Length: 42:05
- Label: earMusic
- Producer: Jona Tee

H.E.A.T chronology
H.E.A.T II (2020)	Force Majeure (2022)	Welcome to the Future (2025)

Singles from Force Majeure
- 1. "Nationwide" Released: 25 March 2022; 2. "Back to the Rhythm" Released: 8 April 2022

Force Majeure is the seventh studio album by the Swedish hard rock group H.E.A.T. It is the band's first album since 2010's Freedom Rock to feature original vocalist Kenny Leckremo. H.E.A.T announced his return in October 2020 after the departure of previous vocalist Erik Grönwall. On 12 December 2020 the band released an alternate version of the song "Rise" from their previous album H.E.A.T II with Leckremo on vocals. The first single from the album, "Nationwide", was released on 25 March 2022. "Back to the Rhythm" was chosen as the second single and was released on 8 April 2022.

== Track listing ==
Force Majeure track listing
No.	Title	Writer(s)	Length
1.	"Back to the Rhythm"	Dave Dalone, Jona Tee	4:15
2.	"Nationwide"	Dave Dalone, Jona Tee, Kenny Leckremo	3:45
3.	"Tainted Blood"	Dave Dalone, Kenny Leckremo	3:49
4.	"Hollywood"	Dave Dalone, Jimmy Jay, Kenny Leckremo	3:35
5.	"Harder to Breathe"	Dave Dalone, Jona Tee	4:16
6.	"Not for Sale"	Jona Tee	3:36
7.	"One of Us"	Kenny Leckremo	3:50
8.	"Hold Your Fire"	Dave Dalone, Jona Tee, Kenny Leckremo	3:48
9.	"Paramount"	Jona Tee	3:54
10.	"Demon Eyes"	Jona Tee, Kenny Leckremo	3:36
11.	"Wings of an Aeroplane"	Dave Dalone, Ludvig Turner	3:36
Total length:			42:05

== Personnel ==
- Kenny Leckremo – vocals
- Dave Dalone – guitars
- Jimmy Jay – bass
- Jona Tee – keyboards
- Don Crash – drums

== Charts ==
Chart performance for Force Majeure
Chart (2022)	Peak position
German Albums (Offizielle Top 100)	16
Spanish Albums (PROMUSICAE)	71
Swedish Albums (Sverigetopplistan)	12
Swiss Albums (Schweizer Hitparade)	19
