= Address the Nation =

Studio album by H.E.A.T
- Released: 23 March 2012
- Genre: Hard rock, arena rock
- Label: Gain/Sony Music
- Producer: Tobias Lindell

H.E.A.T chronology
Freedom Rock (2010)	Address the Nation (2012)	Tearing Down the Walls (2014)

Address the Nation is the third studio album by the Swedish rock group H.E.A.T and first album with the vocalist Erik Grönwall, released in 2012 by the record company Gain/Sony Music. In January 2013, Dave Ling of Classic Rock named Address the Nation the best album of 2012. Sweden Rock Magazine named it the fourth best album of 2012.

== Track listing ==
Address the Nation track listing
No.	Title	Length
1.	"Breaking the Silence"	4:50
2.	"Living on the Run"	4:55
3.	"Falling Down"	4:56
4.	"The One and Only"	5:09
5.	"Better Off Alone"	4:01
6.	"In and Out of Trouble"	4:56
7.	"Need Her"	3:56
8.	"Heartbreaker"	3:05
9.	"It's All About Tonight"	3:34
10.	"Downtown"	4:30
11.	"Back Into Your Arms" (Japanese bonus track)	3:02

== Personnel ==
- Erik Grönwall – vocals
- Dave Dalone – guitars
- Eric Rivers – guitars
- Jimmy Jay – bass
- Jona Tee – keyboards
- Crash – drums

== Charts ==
Chart performance for Address the Nation
Chart (2012)	Peak position
Swedish Albums (Sverigetopplistan)	8
Swiss Albums (Schweizer Hitparade)	94
