= Somewhere Between a Rock and a Hard Place =

Studio album by Erik Grönwall
- Released: 2 June 2010
- Recorded: 2010
- Genre: Pop rock
- Length: 43 minutes
- Language: English
- Label: Columbia, Sony Music
- Producer: Peter Mansson, Fredrik Thomander, Anders Wikström

Erik Grönwall chronology
Erik Grönwall (2009)	Somewhere Between a Rock and a Hard Place (2010)

Somewhere Between a Rock and a Hard Place is the second studio album by Swedish singer and songwriter Erik Grönwall who had won the Swedish Idol title in 2009. The album followed his successful debut studio album Erik Grönwall, released soon after his win. The album is a pop rock album that was released in June 2010 through Sony Music. The album release was preceded by the release of the single, "Crash and Burn", in April 2010, a cover version of a song by Magnus Bäcklund.

Grönwall co-wrote some of the songs on the album, but also relied on the cooperation of other writers as well. "Uphill Climb" and "Breathe In Breathe Out" were composed by Grönwall, and "Destination Anywhere" and "Walls Are Coming Down" are co-written by him and Johan Becker. The title track, "Somewhere Between a Rock and a Hard Place", was written by Nicke Borg. There are songs also from Paul Stanley ("Timeless") and Joey Tempest ("Take Me On"). Grönwall covered Marion Raven's song "In Spite Of Me", included in her first album Here I am.

== Track list ==
1. "Take Me On" (3:13)
2. "Uphill Climb" (3:22)
3. "Try" (3:06)
4. "Stay" (3:44)
5. "Crash and Burn" (4:21)
6. "Destination Anywhere" (3:22)
7. "When You Fall" (3:52)
8. "Timeless" (4:04)
9. "Breathe in Breathe Out" (4:25)
10. "Somewhere Between a Rock and a Hard Place" (3:19)
11. "Walls are Coming Down" (3:19)
12. "In Spite of Me" (4:10)

== Charts ==
Year (2010)	Peak position
Swedish Albums (Sverigetopplistan)	2
