= Into the Great Unknown =

Studio album by H.E.A.T
- Released: 22 September 2017
- Genre: Hard rock, arena rock
- Length: 44:37
- Label: Gain / Sony Music
- Producer: Tobias Lindell

H.E.A.T chronology
Tearing Down the Walls (2014)	Into the Great Unknown (2017)	H.E.A.T II (2020)

Into the Great Unknown is the fifth studio album by Swedish melodic hard rock band H.E.A.T. Released worldwide on 22 September 2017 by the label Gain (working with Sony Music) and produced by Tobias Lindell. The album has received praise from publications such as Louder.

== Background and production details ==
The group's last album was 2014's Tearing Down the Walls. According to a press release, the band decided to record Into the Great Unknown in Bangkok, Thailand, having already come up with ten possible songs to use, and used the facilities of Karma Sound Studios. The release also stated that H.E.A.T took inspiration at the modern resurgence in public attention, particularly among young adults, of older artists considered "classic rock heroes" such as Foreigner, Journey, and Whitesnake.

It is the band's second release without a founding guitarist, in this case Eric Rivers, and the first with the return of Dave Dalone.

In August 2017, the group released the track "Redefined" along with a music video depicting footage of H.E.A.T in the studio.

== Reception ==
Professional ratings
Review scores
Source	Rating
Louder	4/5 stars
RockReport.be	4.5/6 stars

Writing for Louder, music critic Dom Lawson praised the release for featuring a "thrilling formula that made the Swedes’ previous albums such a goofy delight." He remarked that the "effervescent presence and towering voice of frontman Erik Grönwall make everything from... sound vital and timely without sacrificing any of that mid-80s sheen." Lawson concluded, "The best way to get drawn into H.E.A.T’s world of singalong euphoria is to catch them live, but this album will provide more than enough dizzying, life-affirming joy in the meantime."

== Track listing ==
Into the Great Unknown track listing
No.	Title	Writer(s)	Length
1.	"Bastard of Society"	Jona Tee, Erik Gronwall	3:50
2.	"Redefined"	Jimmy Jay	4:19
3.	"Shit City"	Jona Tee, Don Crash	3:52
4.	"Time on Our Side"	Jimmy Jay	3:53
5.	"Best of the Broken"	Jona Tee, Erik Gronwall, Don Crash, Peter Larsson	4:31
6.	"Eye of the Storm"	Jona Tee, Erik Gronwall, Fredrik Thomander, Johan Becker, Sharon Vaughn	3:41
7.	"Blind Leads the Blind"	Jona Tee	3:23
8.	"We Rule"	Jona Tee, Erik Gronwall, Fredrik Thomander, Sharon Vaughn	5:44
9.	"Do You Want It?"	Jona Tee, Erik Gronwall, Don Crash	4:04
10.	"Into the Great Unknown"	Jona Tee	7:24
Total length:			44:37

== Personnel ==
- Erik Grönwall – vocals
- Dave "Sky Davis" Dalone – guitars
- Jona Tee – keyboards
- Jimmy Jay – bass
- Crash – drums

== Charts ==
Chart performance for Into the Great Unknown
Chart (2017)	Peak position
Belgian Albums (Ultratop Flanders)	191
German Albums (Offizielle Top 100)	97
Spanish Albums (PROMUSICAE)	87
Swedish Albums (Sverigetopplistan)	14
Swiss Albums (Schweizer Hitparade)	34
