= Erik Grönwall (album) =

Studio album by Erik Grönwall
- Released: December 2009
- Recorded: 2009
- Genre: Arena rock Hard rock Power Pop
- Language: English
- Label: Columbia / Sony Music

Erik Grönwall chronology
Erik Grönwall (2009)	Somewhere Between a Rock and a Hard Place (2010)

Erik Grönwall is the debut studio album by hard rock vocalist Erik Grönwall, winner of the Swedish singing television competition Idol 2009. The release is a cover album of various different pop and rock artists that have inspired Grönwall. He followed the album up with 2010's Somewhere Between a Rock and a Hard Place. Erik Grönwall entered the Swedish Albums Chart at number one, staying there for four weeks. The album received generally negative reviews from Swedish music critics, but was a commercial success, becoming certified Platinum in Sweden with at least 40,000 copies sold.

== Track listing ==
No.	Title	Original artist	Length
1.	"Higher"	Erik Grönwall	3:34
2.	"Over You"	Daughtry	3:36
3.	"Run to the Hills"	Iron Maiden	3:50
4.	"The Show Must Go On"	Queen	4:09
5.	"Hey Jude"	The Beatles	4:22
6.	"Heaven"	Bryan Adams	4:04
7.	"Shout It Out Loud"	Kiss	2:51
8.	"Leave a Light On for Me"	Belinda Carlisle	4:00
9.	"My Life Would Suck Without You"	Kelly Clarkson	3:32
10.	"Bodies"	Robbie Williams	3:41
11.	"Is It True?"	Yohanna	3:06
12.	"18 and Life"	Skid Row	3:42
Total length:			44:27

== Charts and certifications ==
=== Weekly charts ===
Chart	Peak position	Certification	Sales
Swedish Albums (Sverigetopplistan)	1	GLF: Platinum	40,000

=== Year-end charts ===
Chart (2009)	Position
Swedish Albums (Sverigetopplistan)	14

== Release history ==
Region	Date	Label	Format
Sweden	21 December 2009	Columbia Records (Sony BMG)	CD; Digital download
