= Higher (Erik Grönwall song) =

Single by Erik Grönwall

from the album Erik Grönwall
- Released: 11 December 2009
- Recorded: 2009
- Genre: Pop
- Label: Columbia / Sony Music
- Songwriters: Pär Westerlund, Joakim Olovsson

Higher is a Swedish English language single by Erik Grönwall, winner of the Swedish version of Idol in its sixth season in 2009. He sang the winning song when he was declared winner on December 11, 2009.

The single, taken from his debut self-titled album Erik Grönwall, went straight to number one on the Swedish Single Charts on 18 December 2009 and stayed at that position for 5 weeks (18 and 25 December 2009 and 1, 8 and 15 January 2010) making it both the Swedish Christmas and the New Year number one. After being toppled from top position for one week by Lady Gaga's Bad Romance on the charts of 22 January 2010, the song returned once again to the top on the chart dated 29 January 2010 for a 6th week at number one.

The song was written by Pär Westerlund and Joakim Olovsson. It was sung in the final by both Erik Grönwall and runner-up Calle Kristiansson.

== Charts ==
=== Weekly charts ===
Chart (2009–2010)	Peak position
Sweden (Sverigetopplistan)	1

=== Year-end charts ===
Chart (2009)	Position
Sweden (Sverigetopplistan)	2
Chart (2010)	Position
Sweden (Sverigetopplistan)	52
