= H.E.A.T II =

Studio album by H.E.A.T
- Released: 21 February 2020
- Genre: Hard rock, arena rock
- Length: 45:27
- Label: earMusic
- Producer: Jona Tee

H.E.A.T chronology
Into the Great Unknown (2017)	H.E.A.T II (2020)	Force Majeure (2022)

Singles from H.E.A.T II
- 1. "One by One" Released: 27 September 2019; 2. "Rise" Released: 8 November 2019; 3. "Back to Life" Released: 29 June 2020

H.E.A.T II is the sixth studio album by the Swedish hard rock group H.E.A.T and final album with lead singer Erik Grönwall. The album was released on 21 February 2020 through earMUSIC. As the album came out at the onset of the COVID-19 pandemic, H.E.A.T did not extensively tour for it that year. The band announced they were postponing their tour dates until 2021. In October 2020 it was announced that Erik Grönwall would be leaving the band; being replaced by original lead singer Kenny Leckremo. When the tour resumed H.E.A.T stated that all tour dates from that point onward would feature Kenny as their vocalist. Singles from the album include "One by One", released on 27 September 2019 and "Rise", released on 8 November 2019. On 29 June, 2020 the band released a previously unheard song called "Back to Life" that was recorded during the H.E.A.T II sessions.

== Track listing ==
H.E.A.T II track listing
No.	Title	Writer(s)	Length
1.	"Rock Your Body"	Jona Tee	4:03
2.	"Dangerous Ground"	Dave Dalone	4:10
3.	"Come Clean"	Jimmy Jay	3:39
4.	"Victory"	Dave Dalone, Jona Tee	4:36
5.	"We Are Gods"	Dave Dalone, Jona Tee	4:11
6.	"Adrenaline"	Jona Tee	4:26
7.	"One by One"	Dave Dalone, Jona Tee, Erik Gronwall	3:47
8.	"Nothing to Say"	Dave Dalone, Jona Tee	4:07
9.	"Heaven Must Have Won an Angel"	Dave Dalone, Jona Tee	4:41
10.	"Under the Gun"	Dave Dalone, Jona Tee	3:25
11.	"Rise"	Dave Dalone, Jona Tee	4:17
Total length:			45:27

== Personnel ==
- Erik Grönwall – vocals
- Dave Dalone – guitars
- Jimmy Jay – bass
- Jona Tee – keyboards
- Don Crash – drums

== Charts ==
Chart performance for H.E.A.T II
Chart (2020)	Peak position
Austrian Albums (Ö3 Austria)	48
Belgian Albums (Ultratop Flanders)	152
German Albums (Offizielle Top 100)	24
Spanish Albums (PROMUSICAE)	22
Swedish Albums (Sverigetopplistan)	22
Swiss Albums (Schweizer Hitparade)	17
