= Tearing Down the Walls (H.E.A.T album) =

Studio album by H.E.A.T
- Released: 26 March 2014
- Genre: Hard rock, arena rock
- Label: earMusic
- Producer: Tobias Lindell

H.E.A.T chronology
Address the Nation (2012)	Tearing Down the Walls (2014)	Into the Great Unknown (2017)

Singles from Tearing Down the Walls
- 1. "A Shot at Redemption" Released: 12 February 2014; 2. "Mannequin Show" Released: 25 April 2014

Tearing Down the Walls is the fourth studio album by the Swedish hard rock group H.E.A.T and only album without the guitarist Dave Dalone. The album was released on 26 March 2014 by the record company Gain/Sony Music. The first single off the album is "A Shot at Redemption", released on 12 February 2014. The single is featured in Season 2, Episode 4 of the show Peacemaker. The second is 'Mannequin Show'.

== Track listing ==
Tearing Down the Walls track listing
No.	Title	Writer(s)	Length
1.	"Point of No Return"	H.E.A.T	5:16
2.	"A Shot at Redemption"	H.E.A.T	3:50
3.	"Inferno"	H.E.A.T	3:45
4.	"The Wreckoning"	H.E.A.T	1:02
5.	"Tearing Down the Walls"	H.E.A.T	3:33
6.	"Mannequin Show"	H.E.A.T	3:43
7.	"We Will Never Die"	H.E.A.T, Dalone	3:50
8.	"Emergency"	H.E.A.T	4:11
9.	"All the Nights"	H.E.A.T, Thomander, Vaughn	4:08
10.	"Eye for an Eye"	H.E.A.T, Thomander	3:41
11.	"Enemy in Me"	H.E.A.T	3:37
12.	"Laughing at Tomorrow"	H.E.A.T, Sterner	4:25

== Personnel ==
- Erik Grönwall – vocals
- Eric Rivers – guitars
- Jimmy Jay – bass
- Jona Tee – keyboards
- Don Crash – drums

== Charts ==
Chart performance for Tearing Down the Walls
Chart (2014)	Peak position
German Albums (Offizielle Top 100)	78
Swedish Albums (Sverigetopplistan)	36
Swiss Albums (Schweizer Hitparade)	37
