= H.E.A.T (band) =

Swedish rock band

H.E.A.T.
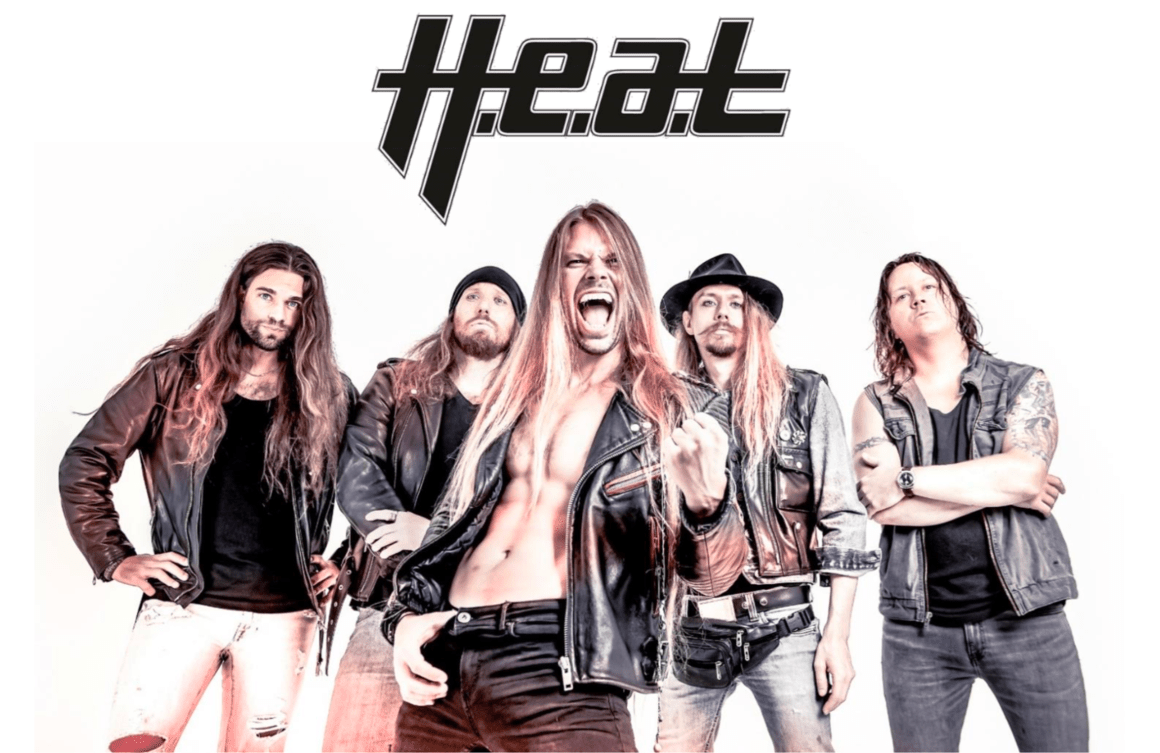
- H.E.A.T's current lineup from left to right: Don Crash, Jona Tee, Kenny Leckremo, Dave Dalone, and Jimmy Jay

Background information
- Origin: Upplands Väsby, Sweden
- Genres: Hard rock, arena rock
- Years active: 2007–present
- Labels: GAIN/Sony Music (Sweden); EarMusic/Edel AG (Europe); Avalon Marquee (Japan)
- Members: Jona Tee; Jimmy Jay; Don Crash; Kenny Leckremo; Dave Dalone
- Past members: Erik Grönwall; Eric Rivers
- Website: heatsweden.com

H.E.A.T is a Swedish hard rock group that was formed in Upplands Väsby in 2007, when the prior bands Dream and Trading Fate merged. The band's heavy sound is strongly influenced by past melodic rock groups such as Whitesnake, with H.E.A.T having supported musical acts such as Scorpions. Original H.E.A.T vocalist, Kenny Leckremo, returned to the band in 2020.

== History ==
The band were signed to Peter Stormare's record label StormVox, and in 2008 the debut album H.E.A.T was released. The second album, titled Freedom Rock, came in 2010 on the same record label.

In 2011, they signed with GAIN music (Sony) and they also signed a new management, Hagenburg management.

In 2007, they were an opening act to Toto, and the following year they were the opening act to Sabaton and Alice Cooper, as well as performed at the Sweden Rock Festival that year. They were also awarded with the Årets nykomlingar award, an award given out by the Swedish radio station P4 Dist for the best new artist of the year, as voted by the listeners.

In 2009, the band played at the Melodifestivalen 2009, the Swedish qualifier to the annual Eurovision Song Contest, making it to the final round with the song "1000 Miles". The band have also toured around Europe as an opening act to Edguy in January 2009. Freedom Rock was ranked in the top 10 AOR/Melodic Rock albums of 2010 by Classic Rock Magazine. In July 2010 Kenny Leckremo announced he was leaving the band. Leckremo suffered from a genetic heart condition that caused his heart to beat extremely fast and it was causing him to have to step off stage to catch his breath. He would later undergo an operation to correct this condition but it was years after he had already left the band. Leckremo was replaced by Erik Grönwall later that year.

H.E.A.T released their third studio album, Address the Nation, on 28 March 2012. The first single from the album was "Living on the Run". It was the first album with new singer and was featured in many of the top 10 list of music sites around the internet. It also received a review of 98% on Melodicrock.com.

2014 saw the return of the much anticipated new album Tearing Down the Walls, and in October 2014 the band headlined the last ever Firefest concert at Rock City in Nottingham, England.

H.E.A.T released their fifth studio album, Into the Great Unknown, on 20 September 2017. The album saw the return of former guitarist Dave Dalone, who rejoined the band after the departure of Eric Rivers in 2016. Dave Ling of Classic Rock Magazine published the following quote in his review of Into the Great Unknown: "H.E.A.T. have just made the most complete album of their career. Watch their rise continue."

H.E.A.T released H.E.A.T II on 21 February 2020. The band had to postpone many tour dates until 2021 due to the COVID-19 pandemic.

On 30 October 2020, the band announced via their official Facebook page that original singer Kenny Leckremo has rejoined the band replacing Erik Grönwall who was pursuing other projects and later joining Skid Row. In 2022, the new lineup released their new album Force Majeure, their first with Leckremo since 2010's Freedom Rock.

In January 2025, the band announced that their eighth studio album, Welcome to the Future, would be released 25 April 2025. The album was preceded by the singles "Disaster", "Bad Time for Love", and "Running to You".

== Members ==
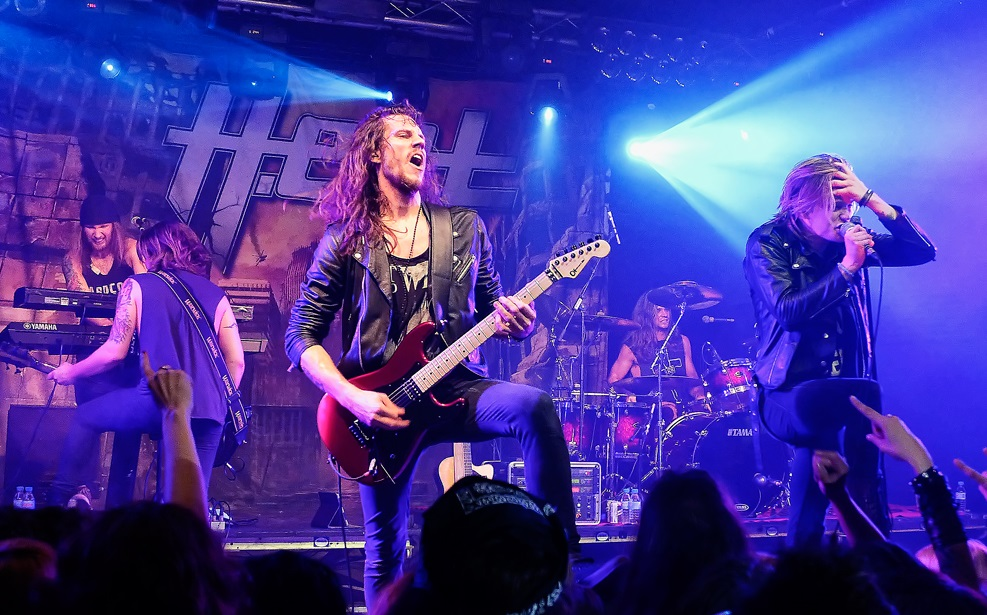
H.E.A.T performing in Madrid in 2014. From left to right: Jona Tee, Jimmy Jay, Eric Rivers, Don Crash, and Erik Grönwall.

=== Current members ===
- Jimmy "Jay" Johansson – bass, backing vocals (2007–present)
- Jonas "Jona Tee" Thegel – keyboards, backing vocals (2007–present)
- Lars "Don Crash" Jarkell – drums (2007–present), backing vocals (2013–present)
- Dave Dalone – guitars, backing vocals (2007–2013, 2016–present)
- Kenny Leckremo – lead vocals, acoustic guitar (2007–2010, 2020–present)

=== Former members ===
- Erik "Eric Rivers" Hammarbäck – guitars, backing vocals (2007–2016)
- Erik Grönwall – lead vocals, acoustic guitar, harmonica (2010–2020)

=== Touring members ===
- Erik Modin - drums, backing vocals (2023, 2026)

== Discography ==
=== Studio albums ===
- H.E.A.T (2008)
- Freedom Rock (2010)
- Address the Nation (2012)
- Tearing Down the Walls (2014)
- Into the Great Unknown (2017)
- H.E.A.T II (2020)
- Force Majeure (2022)
- Welcome to the Future (2025)

=== EPs ===
- Beg, Beg, Beg (2010)
- A Shot at Redemption (2014)
- Extra Force (2023)

=== Live albums ===
- Live in London (2015)
- Live at Sweden Rock Festival (2019)

=== Singles ===
- "1000 Miles" (2009)
- "Keep On Dreaming" (2009)
- "Beg, Beg, Beg" (2010)
- "Living on the Run" (2012)
- "It's All About Tonight" (2012)
- "A Shot at Redemption" (2014)
- "Mannequin Show" (2014)
- "Time On Our Side" (2017)
- "Redefined" (2017)
- "Eye of the Storm" (2017)
- "Best of the Broken" (2017)
- "One by One" (2019)
- "Rise" (2019)
- "Come Clean" (2020)
- "Dangerous Ground" (2020)
- "Back to Life" (2020)
- "Nationwide" (2022)
- "Back to the Rhythm" (2022)
- "Hollywood" (2022)
- "Freedom" (2023)
- "Will You Be" (2023)
- "Disaster" (2025)
- "Bad Time for Love" (2025)
- "Running to You" (2025)
- "Call My Name" (2025)
- "Set Me On Fire" (2026)
