= Welcome to the Future (video game) =

1995 video game

- Publisher: Blue Sky Entertainment
- Platforms: PC; Mac
- Release: 1995
- Genre: Adventure

Welcome to the Future is a 1995 adventure video game, developed by Blue Sky Entertainment. It was released on PC and Mac on December 31, 1995.

== Gameplay ==
The game is a point-and-click adventure game in which players study clues and symbols to solve puzzles and progress through the game. The gameplay is centered on peaceful exploration and discovery rather than challenge or conflict. Players wander through landscapes, collecting objects that function like keys to operate machines and to open doors. Progress comes from using these items in the correct places, gradually unlocking new areas and experiences.

== Reception ==
Reception

Review scores
Publication	Score
PC Entertainment	3/5
PC Joker	69%
The Park Record	2/5

John R. Quain, writing for Entertainment Weekly gave the game a B rating.

The Palm Beach Post said "Welcome to the Future is too subtle to appeal to everyone, but after some patient exploration, I grew to like it, especially the New Age music".
