= Welcome to the Future (album) =

Studio album by H.E.A.T
- Released: 25 April 2025
- Genre: Hard rock, arena rock
- Length: 45:34
- Label: earMusic
- Producer: H.E.A.T

H.E.A.T chronology
| Force Majeure (2022) | Welcome to the Future (2025) |

Singles from Welcome to the Future
- 1. "Disaster" Released: 24 January 2025; 2. "Bad Time for Love" Released: 5 March 2025; 3. "Running to You" Released: 2 April 2025; 4. "Call My Name" Released: 25 April 2025

Welcome to the Future is the eighth studio album by the Swedish hard rock group H.E.A.T. The singles "Disaster", "Bad Time for Love", and "Running to You" preceded the album's release. The album was released on 25 April 2025 by earMusic.

== Track listing ==
All tracks produced by H.E.A.T

Welcome to the Future track listing
| No. | Title | Writer(s) | Length |
|---|---|---|---|
| 1. | "Disaster" | Jona Tee | 3:45 |
| 2. | "Bad Time for Love" | Jona Tee | 3:01 |
| 3. | "Running to You" | Dave Dalone, Jona Tee, Kenny Leckremo | 3:03 |
| 4. | "Call My Name" | Dave Dalone, Jona Tee | 4:15 |
| 5. | "In Disguise" | Jimmy Jay, Kenny Leckremo | 3:36 |
| 6. | "The End" | Dave Dalone, Kenny Leckremo | 4:25 |
| 7. | "Rock Bottom" | Jona Tee | 3:30 |
| 8. | "Children of the Storm" | Jimmy Jay | 4:01 |
| 9. | "Losing Game" | Dave Dalone, Kenny Leckremo | 4:06 |
| 10. | "Paradise Lost" | Jona Tee | 3:49 |
| 11. | "Tear It Down (R.N.R.R.)" | Kenny Leckremo | 4:31 |
| 12. | "We Will Not Forget" | Dave Dalone, Jona Tee, Kenny Leckremo | 3:26 |
| Total length: | | | 45:34 |

== Personnel ==
- Kenny Leckremo – vocals
- Dave Dalone (listed as Sky Davids) – guitars
- Jimmy Jay – bass
- Jona Tee – keyboards
- Don Crash – drums

== Charts ==
Chart performance for Welcome to the Future
| Chart (2025) | Peak position |
|---|---|
| Austrian Albums (Ö3 Austria) | 32 |
| German Albums (Offizielle Top 100) | 29 |
| Scottish Albums (OCC) | 36 |
| Swedish Albums (Sverigetopplistan) | 20 |
| Swiss Albums (Schweizer Hitparade) | 16 |
| UK Album Downloads (OCC) | 37 |
| UK Independent Albums (OCC) | 15 |
| UK Rock & Metal Albums (OCC) | 3 |
