= Erik Grönwall =

Swedish singer (born 1987)

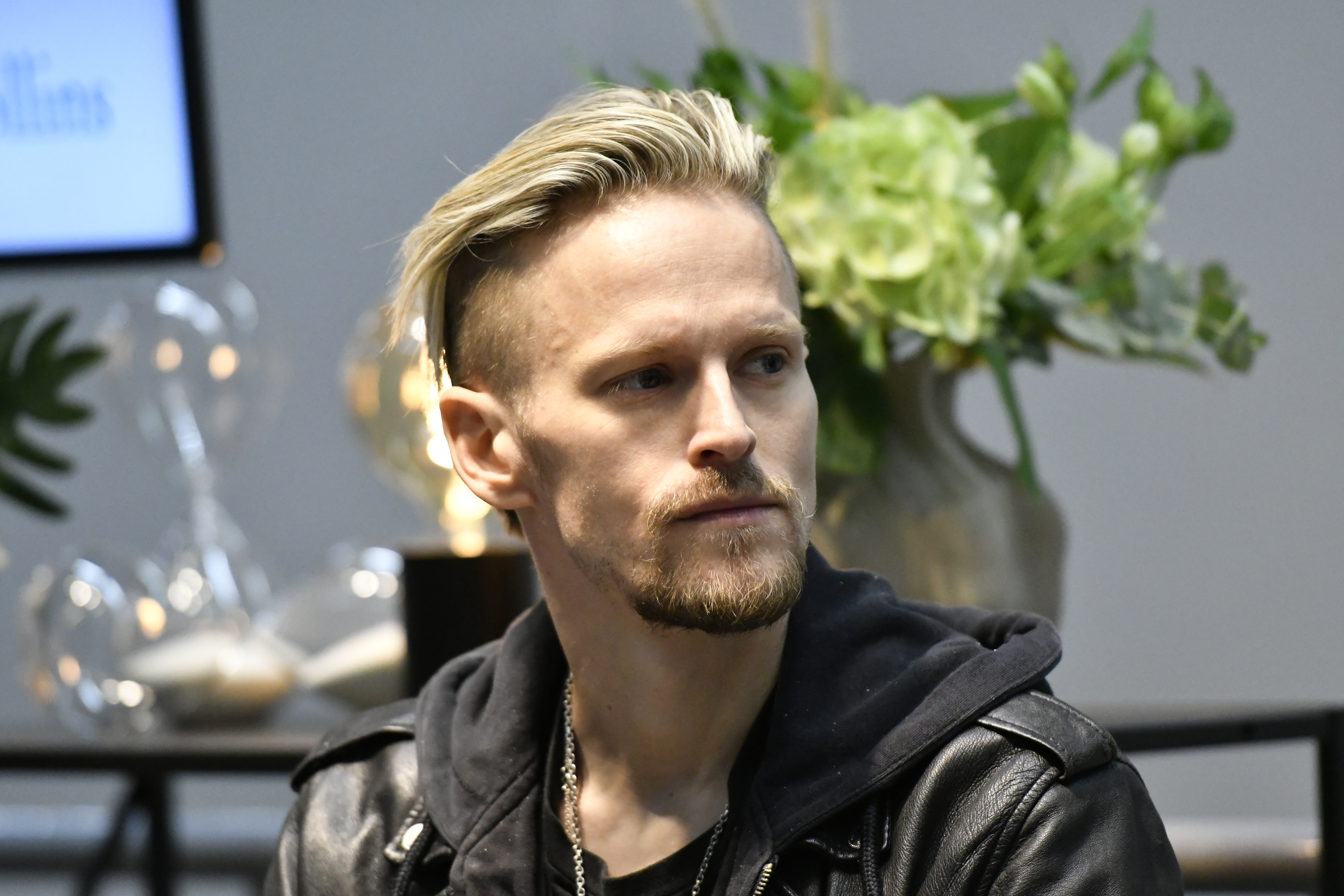
- Grönwall at the 2024 Göteborg Book Fair

Background information
- Born: Per Erik Magnus Grönwall; 3 December 1987 (age 38); Knivsta, Sweden
- Origin: Stockholm, Sweden
- Genres: Hard rock; arena rock; heavy metal; glam metal; power metal; pop rock (early)
- Occupation: Singer
- Years active: 2009–present
- Label: Sony Music Sweden
- Member of: Michael Schenker Group
- Formerly of: H.E.A.T; Skid Row

Per Erik Magnus Grönwall (born 3 December 1987) is a Swedish hard rock and heavy metal singer. In 2009, he won the Swedish Idol reality television show, receiving several standing ovations from the jury for his performances over the course of the competition. His first single, "Higher", reached gold on digital downloads after only three days. His debut album Erik Grönwall was released just ten days after the finals and debuted at number one on the Swedish albums chart, eventually certified platinum. Both as a solo artist and band member, Grönwall has numerous top 40 hits.

In 2010, Grönwall joined rock band H.E.A.T as its lead singer. In 2018, he portrayed Simon Zealotes in the NBC live television concert production of Andrew Lloyd Webber and Tim Rice's Jesus Christ Superstar, for which he received a Grammy nomination in the Best Musical Theater Album category. He left H.E.A.T in 2020 after four albums with the band, and in 2022 joined Skid Row. Grönwall left Skid Row in March 2024 to prioritize his recovery from leukemia.

== Career ==
=== Early life ===
Grönwall was born in Knivsta, a small town about 30 miles north of Stockholm. He started his musical career by playing the guitar in a local punk/rock band. During high school, his focus went from mostly playing the guitar to singing. He became the lead singer and rhythm guitarist of the metal band RAID from north-eastern Stockholm and played with them until summer 2008. His future as a singer took shape for the first time as he performed the leading role as Galileo Figaro in the Queen musical We Will Rock You, performing at a number of shows at Oscarsteatern in Stockholm. Aggressive, charismatic hard rock frontmen such as Paul Stanley (of Kiss) and Freddie Mercury (of Queen) influenced Grönwall.

=== Swedish Idol 2009 ===
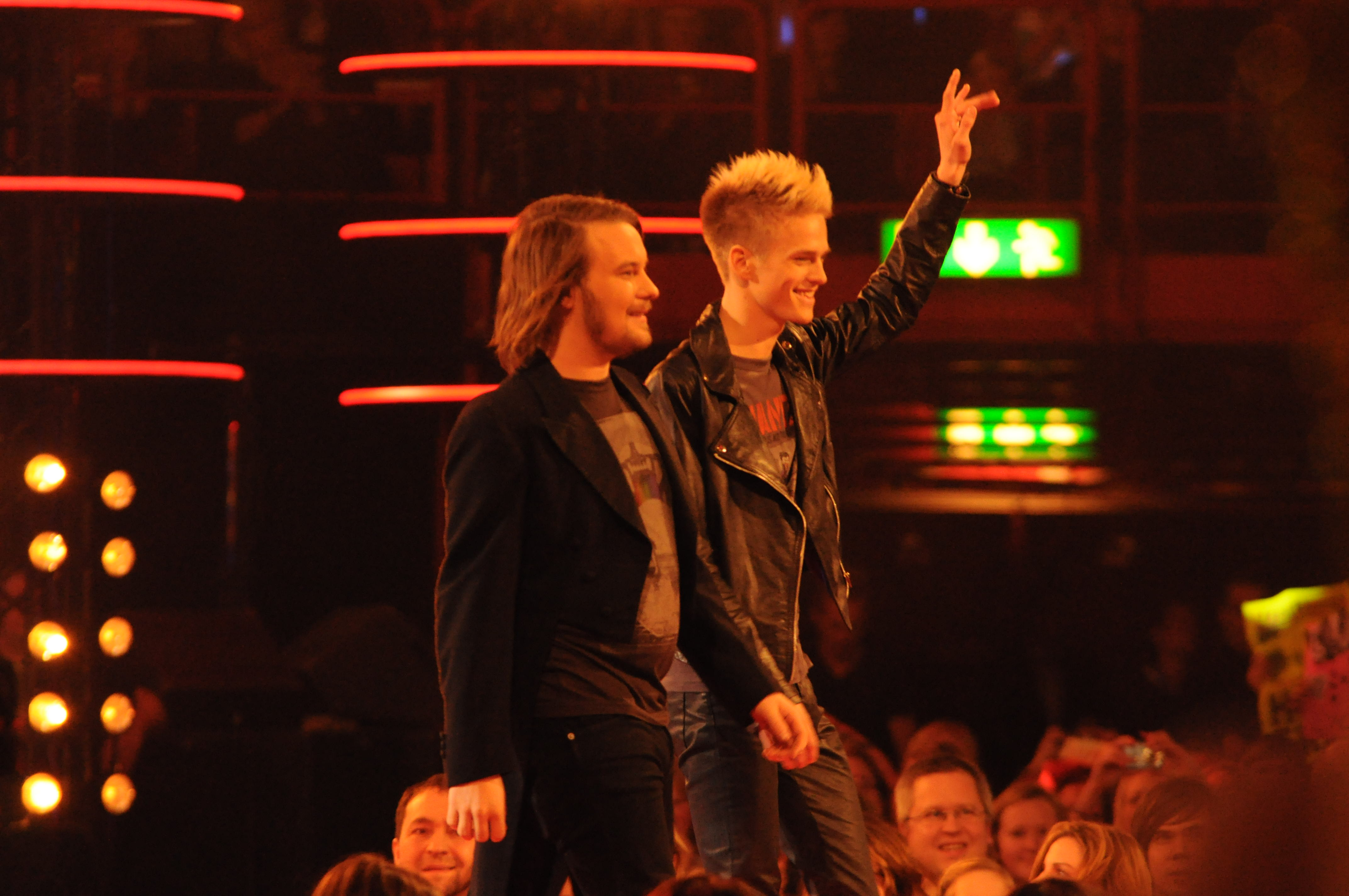
Grönwall (right) with Swedish Idol runner-up Calle Kristiansson in 2009

Grönwall first auditioned for Swedish Idol in 2007, but he did not reach the final auditions. He returned in 2009 and was successful this time, performing Skid Row's "18 and Life". Grönwall performed several rock songs during the show (Kiss – "Shout It Out Loud", Iron Maiden – "Run to the Hills" and Queen – "The Show Must Go On"). He subsequently won the competition.

=== After Idol ===
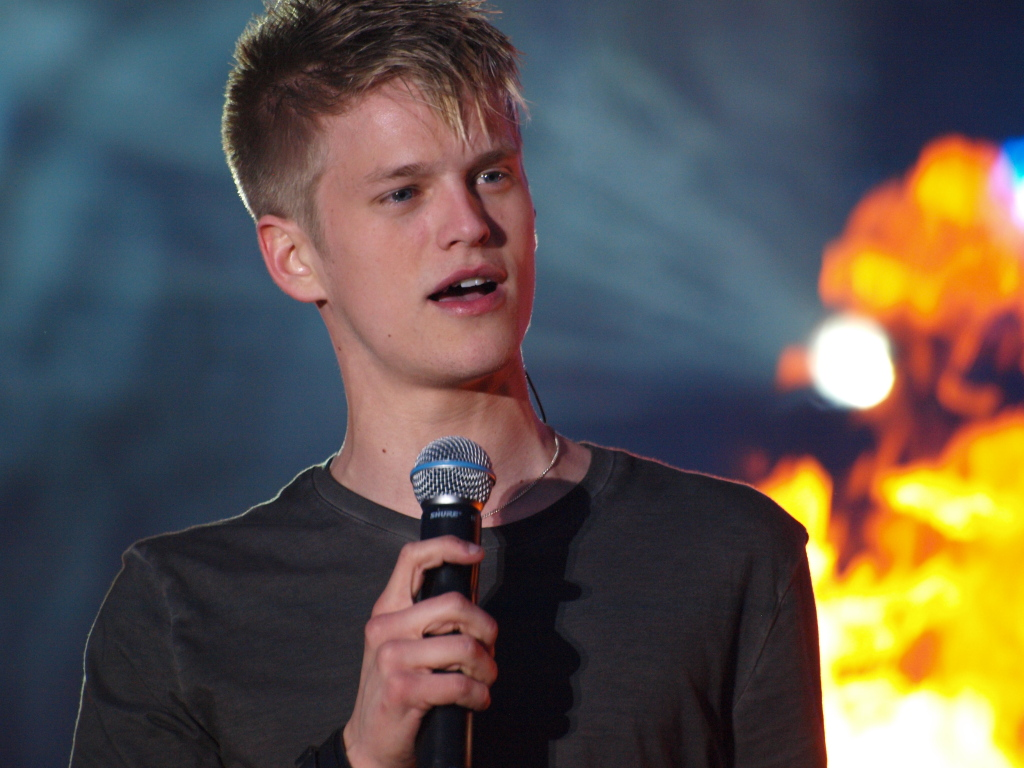
Grönwall performing in 2010

Immediately following Idol, Grönwall released his debut single, "Higher", which debuted at number one on Sverigetopplistan. One week later, his debut album "Erik Grönwall" was released, which included songs performed during the Idol shows. The album reached the number one spot on Sverigetopplistan, and was certified Platinum.

In 2009, Grönwall began working on his second studio album titled "Somewhere Between a Rock and a Hard Place" scheduled to be released on 2 June 2010. The lead single for the album, "Crash and Burn", was released on 19 April 2010. The album included songs written by Joey Tempest, Paul Stanley, Jörgen Elofsson and Nicke Borg, amongst others.

He made his acting debut in America in the live televised concert rendition of Andrew Lloyd Webber and Tim Rice's Jesus Christ Superstar as the apostle Simon Zealotes on 1 April 2018, Easter Sunday.

=== H.E.A.T ===
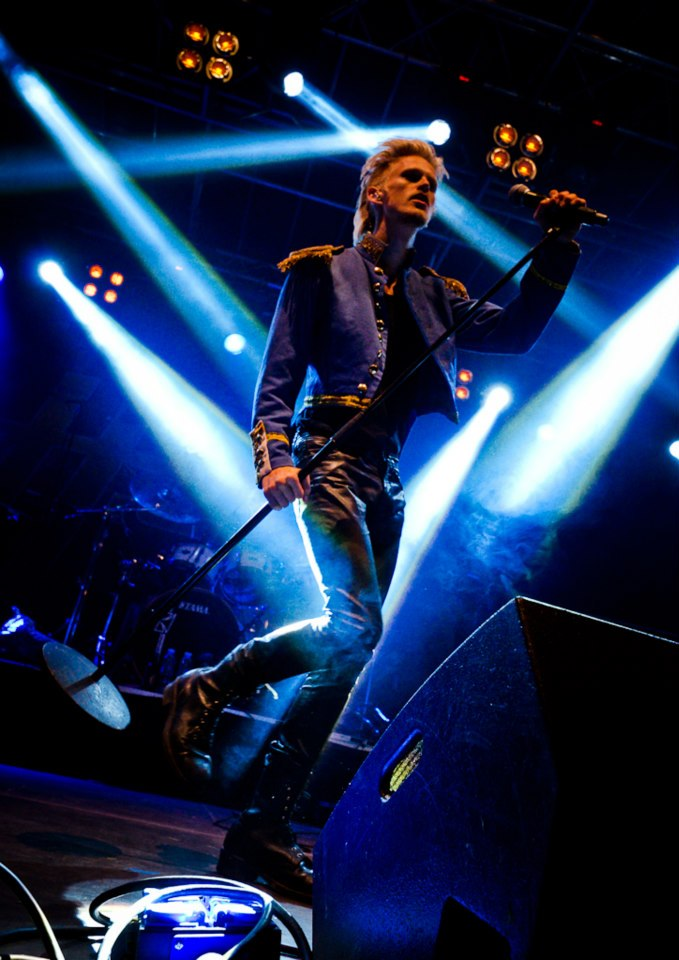
Grönwall performing in 2012

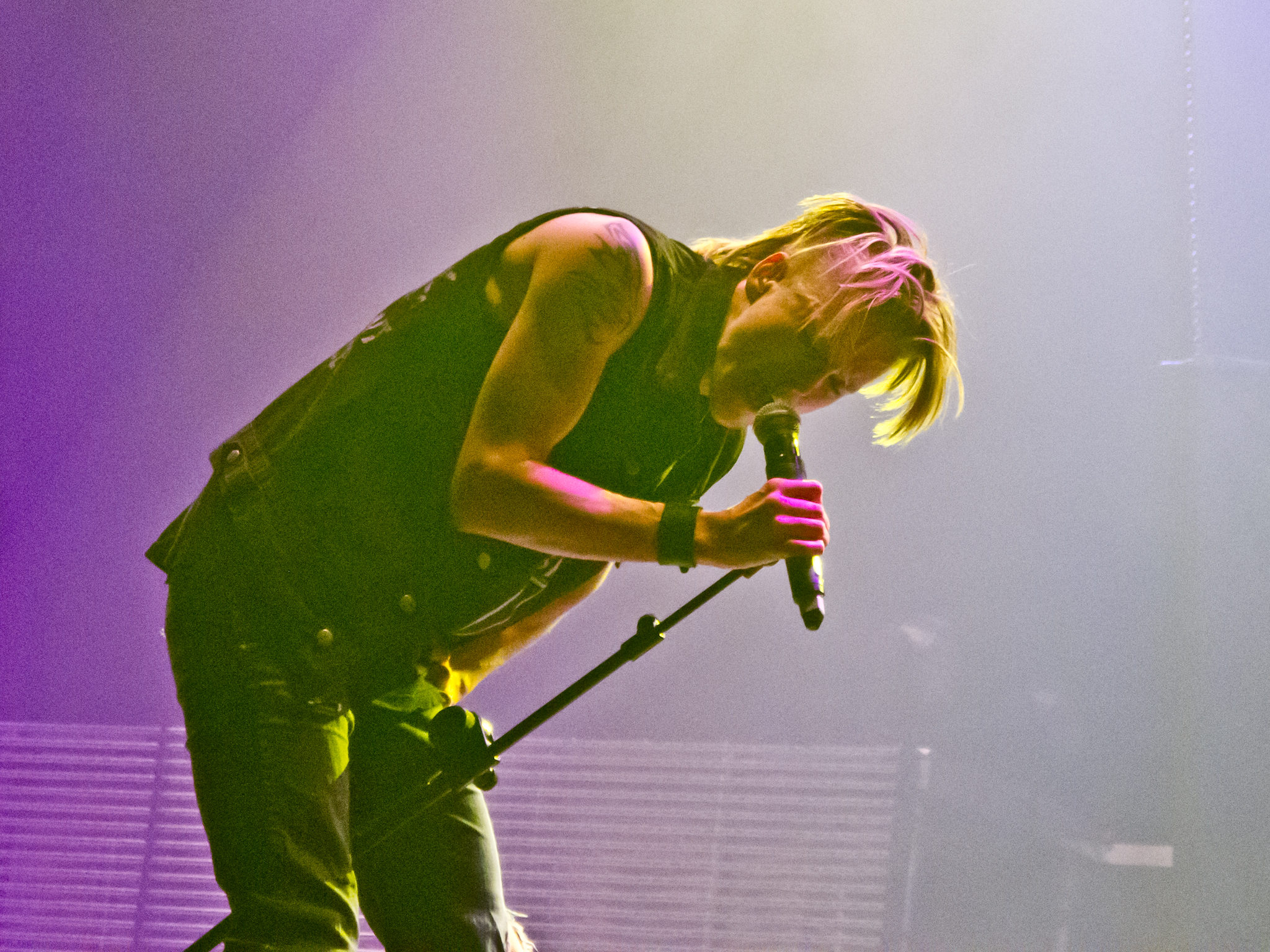
Grönwall performing in 2014

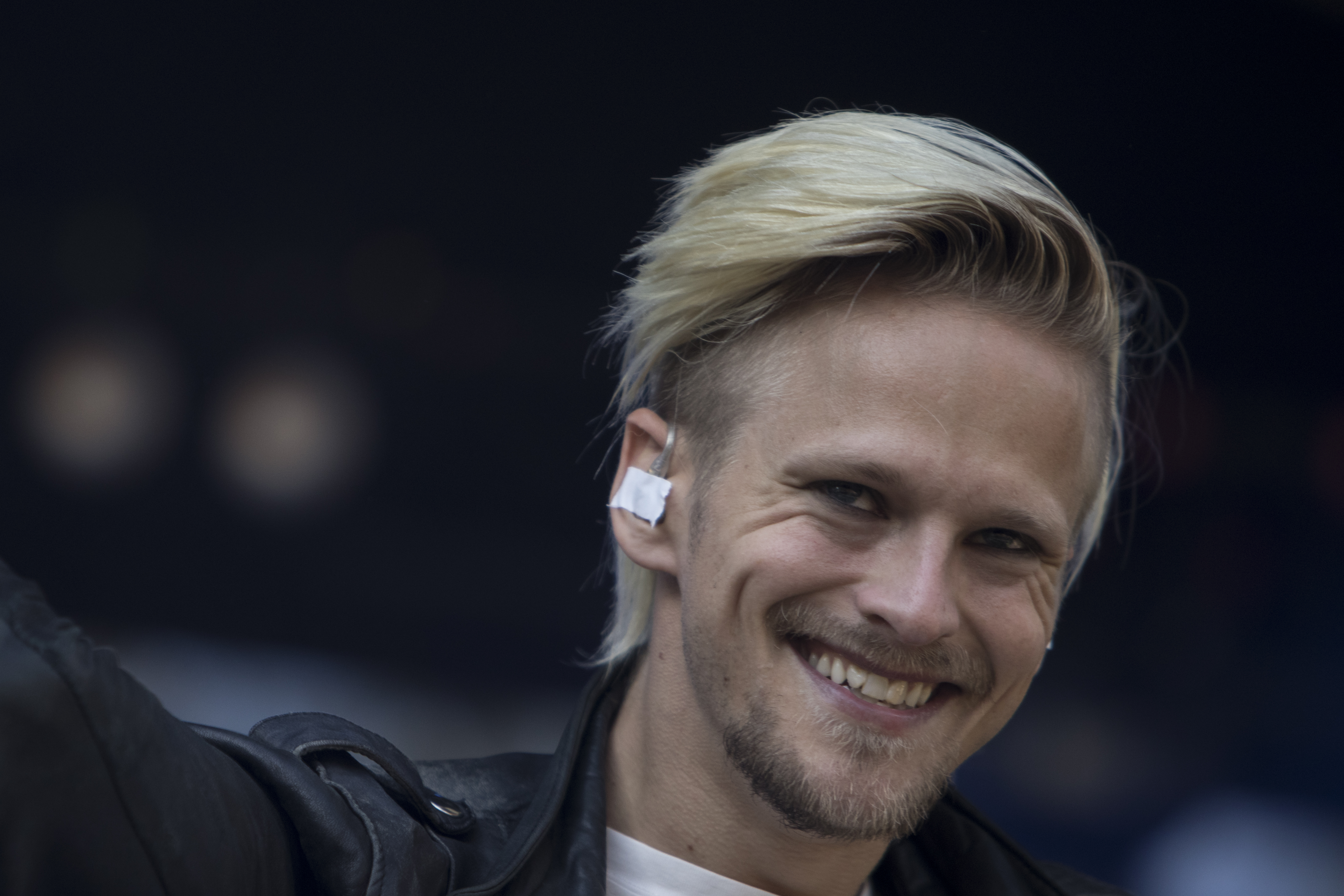
Grönwall with H.E.A.T in 2019

Following the departure of former vocalist Kenny Leckremo in 2010, Grönwall joined Swedish rock band H.E.A.T as lead vocalist. In 2012, they released the album Address the Nation. It was listed number one on the rock charts and was well received by critics. In 2013 H.E.A.T started recording their album, Tearing Down the Walls, which was released in 2014. The band subsequently started their tour with the album. They have played all over the world and been the opening act for bands like Scorpions. In late 2020, Grönwall left H.E.A.T after four albums with the band, and former vocalist Kenny Leckremo rejoined.

=== New Horizon ===
In 2021, it was announced that Grönwall and former bandmate Jona Tee had a new project going, the power metal band New Horizon. Official audio of the track "We Unite" dropped online on 29 November 2021. Already signed to Frontiers Records, their debut album Gate of the Gods was released in early 2022. A video for the track was launched on 5 January 2022, featuring project guest musicians Robban Bäck (Mustasch, ex-Eclipse, ex-Sabaton, ex-Ammunition) and Dave Dalone (also former bandmate in H.E.A.T.) among others.

=== Skid Row ===
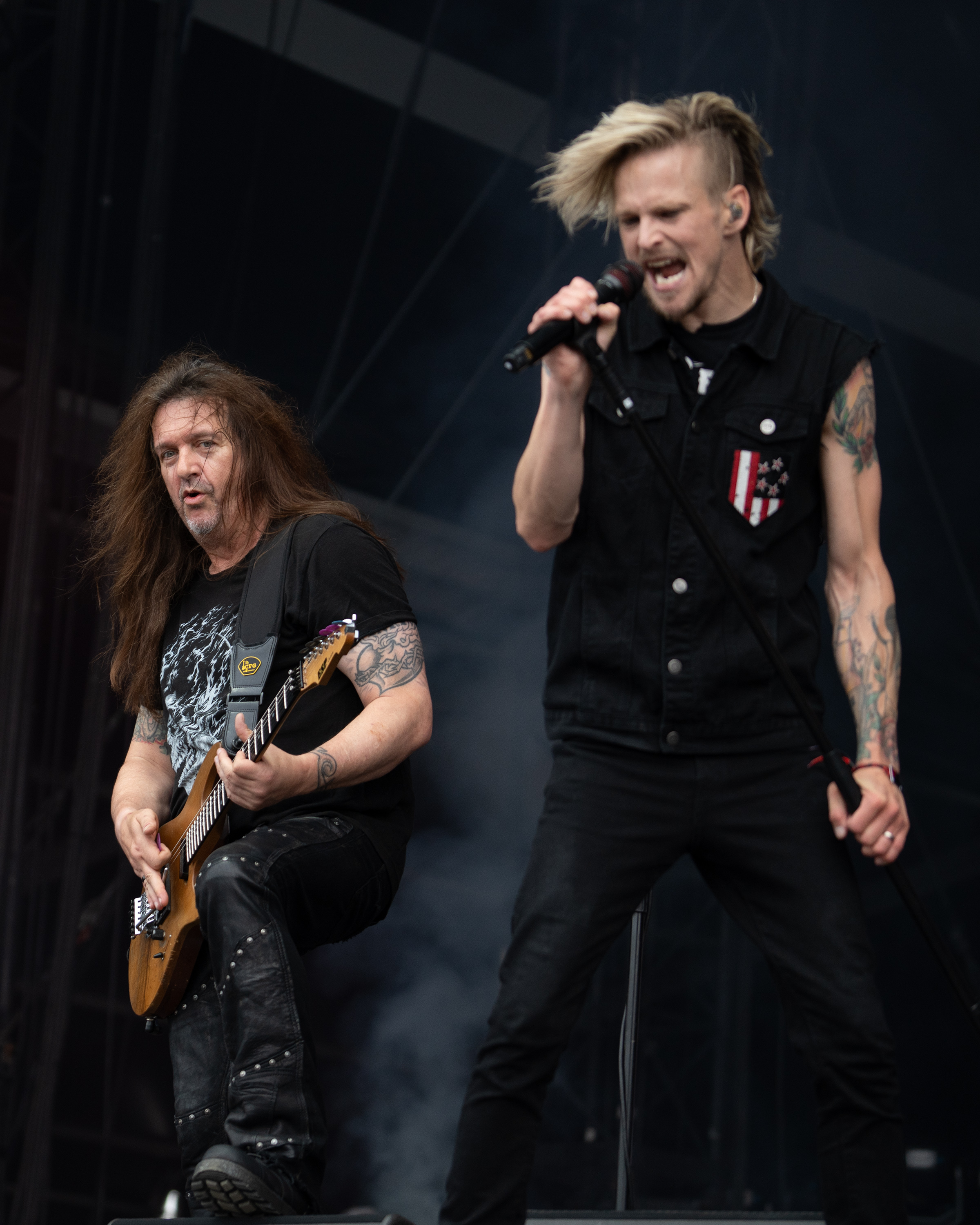
Dave "The Snake" Sabo (left) and Grönwall (right) performing with Skid Row at Hellfest 2023

In March 2022, Grönwall announced that he would be joining American heavy metal band Skid Row as their new vocalist, replacing ZP Theart.

Grönwall, known for his powerful voice, faced health problems, including a diagnosis of acute lymphoblastic leukemia in March 2021. However, during his time with the band, he contributed to the album The Gang's All Here, released in October 2022, marking Skid Row's first studio album in sixteen years. He also toured with the band until the final show on March 22, 2024, at the EPIC Event Center in Green Bay, Wisconsin, USA. After that, he prioritized his recovery, leading to his departure from Skid Row.

In 2025, Grönwall joined German guitarist Michael Schenker for the European tour celebrating Schenker's years with British rock band UFO.

== Discography ==
=== Solo ===
- Erik Grönwall (2009)
- Somewhere Between a Rock and a Hard Place (2010)
- Eriksplanations vol.1 (2023)
- Eriksplanations vol.2 (2025)
- Bad Bones (2026)

=== H.E.A.T ===
- Address the Nation (2012)
- Tearing Down the Walls (2014)
- Into the Great Unknown (2017)
- H.E.A.T. II (2020)

=== New Horizon ===
- Gate of the Gods (2022)

=== Skid Row ===
- The Gang’s All Here (2022)

=== Michael Schenker Group ===
- Don't Sell Your Soul (2025)

=== Singles ===
Year	Song	Chart position	Weeks on list	Sales and certifications	Album
2009	"Higher"	1	19	Platinum	Erik Grönwall
2010	"Crash and Burn"	10	4	N/A	Somewhere Between a Rock and a Hard Place
2019	"Vart vi än går"	—	—	N/A	Non-album single

=== Other charted songs ===
Year	Song	Chart Top #	Weeks on list
2009	"Run to the Hills (Live)"	2	4
2009	"The Show Must Go On (Live)"	9	5
2009	"Always (Live)"	16	1
2009	"18 and Life"	17	2
2009	"Is It True?"	35	1
2009	"Heaven (Live)"	38	1
2009	"Shout It Out Loud (Live)"	49	1
2009	"Hey Jude (Live)"	51	1

Preceded by Kevin Borg	Idol winner Erik Grönwall (2009)	Succeeded by Jay Smith
