= I Was Wrong, I'm Sorry & I Love You =

Studio album by Derek Webb
- Released: August 6, 2013 (pre-release); September 3, 2013 (release)
- Recorded: Fort Sumner Studio, East Nashville, Tennessee, U.S.
- Genres: Folk, contemporary Christian music
- Length: 52:41
- Label: Fair Trade Services
- Producer: Derek Webb

Derek Webb chronology
| Ctrl (2012) | I Was Wrong, I'm Sorry & I Love You (2013) | Fingers Crossed (2017) |

I Was Wrong, I'm Sorry & I Love You (2013) is the eighth studio album from American singer and songwriter Derek Webb, released on September 3, 2013.

The album is a return to his more acoustic guitar-driven earlier work. Webb was the producer, engineer, and nearly sole musician on the album, made in his home studio in Nashville, Tennessee. The themes on the album include battling cynicism, coming to terms with who God makes us to be, Jesus' nearness to the disenfranchised, unity among the divisions of the church, the hard work of marriage, and God's great love. He has called it "easily the most confessional and autobiographical work of my career." The album came under scrutiny after it was reported that Webb was involved in an extramarital affair at the time of its release and promotion.

== Background ==
Regarding the multi-faceted meaning of the album title, Webb explains that he grew up hearing that they were the three things we must learn to say in order to sustain every relationship -a friendship, marriage, or even a church community. Webb stated in an interview that "if I am consciously, deliberately making a record about the church again, I thought I should start with those three statements (I was wrong, I'm sorry, and I love you.)."

His intentions throughout his solo career are expressed by lyrics in the title track, "over all these years, there's just three things I've tried to say." The title expresses a need for Christians to sincerely and earnestly say these things to the world around them and to each other. Webb says, "above all is an album about looking beyond our disagreements to the things we have in common, especially within the church."

This album is essentially a follow-up to his first solo album, 2003's She Must and Shall Go Free. As Webb approached its 10-year anniversary, he began to reflect on how that album would have looked if written today, still exploring the relationships between the church, the culture and himself. The observations, encouragements, criticisms and confessions he discovered—while asking the same questions 10 years later—resulted in the songs comprising I Was Wrong, I'm Sorry & I Love You. He has called the album "a return to strength, a rest from running, and an encouraging start to what I hope to be 10 more years of 'afflicting the comfortable and comforting the afflicted,' starting, as always, with myself."

The first video from the album, for the title track, was released to the Internet on July 30, 2013. The video featured Webb with clips of his fans singing along to the lyrics and holding up various signs with the chorus lyrics on them.

RELEVANT magazine featured the title track, "I Was Wrong, I'm Sorry and I Love You" on their website as well as premiering its video.

== Critical reception ==
Professional ratings
Review scores
| Source | Rating |
|---|---|
| AbsolutePunk | 85% |
| CCM Magazine | 5/5 stars |
| HM | 3.5/5 stars |
| Indie Vision Music | 4/5 stars |
| Jesus Freak Hideout | 4.5/5 stars |
| Jesus Freak Hideout | 4.5/5 stars |
| New Release Tuesday | 4/5 stars |
| The Phantom Tollbooth | 4/5 stars |
| The Phantom Tollbooth | 4/5 stars |

I Was Wrong, I'm Sorry & I Love You garnered critical acclaim from music critics to critique the album. Matt Conner of CCM Magazine wrote that the release comes "Now that he's come full circle, he's given us his masterwork—an album armed with the wisdom that only comes from such travels." At AbsolutePunk, Gregory Robson felt that "Being that Webb's material is deeply pensive and often takes many repeated listens to sink in, there's a chance that months down the line I Was Wrong will make more sense", and that "Given that I Was Wrong was self-produced and that Webb played almost every instrument on the album, there's little reason to dismiss it as unauthentic and/or uninspired." Sean Huncherick of HM stated that "listening to the album feels like walking through the last 20 years of one of the industry's most talented artists. It's not a bad way to celebrate two decades of work." At Indie Vision Music, Ian Zandi stated that in "Taking on a fresh perspective on some of his previous topics, Derek Webb is at the top of his game."

Jen Rose of Jesus Freak Hideout wrote that affirmed that "I Was Wrong... is a worthy contribution, multilayered with much to say, yet a musically rewarding listen even on its own", and wrote that "Though the artist's personal journey is far from done, this chapter makes for a grace-filled homecoming." Also, Jesus Freak Hideout's Mark Rice evoked that "Without a doubt, I Was Wrong... is Webb's musically most accessible album he's put out as he masters the type of sound that almost everyone can appreciate." At New Release Tuesday, Mary Nikkel highlighted that "I Was Wrong, I'm Sorry & I Love You is a culmination, not a contradiction, of Webb's previous body of work, reflecting past themes while recasting them with humility." Scott S. Mertens at The Phantom Tollbooth told that the release was "Somewhat tuned down, both lyrically and musically, this album is a collection of solid songs of faith." Also, Derek Walker stated that "Early listenings made this sound like a pastiche of previous work, with several generic Webb tunes"; however, "it may not show Webb's more controversial prophetic side, but it has plenty to commend it."

== Track listing ==
All tracks are written by Derek Webb, except where noted.

I Was Wrong, I'm Sorry & I Love You track listing
| No. | Title | Lyrics | Music | Length |
|---|---|---|---|---|
| 1. | "I Was Wrong, I'm Sorry & I Love You" | | | 3:56 |
| 2. | "Eye of the Hurricane" | Sandra McCracken; Webb | McCracken; Webb | 4:21 |
| 3. | "Lover Part 3" | McCracken; Webb | McCracken; Webb | 4:36 |
| 4. | "Closer than You Think" | | | 3:36 |
| 5. | "Heavy" | | | 5:11 |
| 6. | "Everything Will Change" | | | 5:52 |
| 7. | "I Measure the Days" (simplified Anglican chant) | McCracken; Webb | Jerome Webster Meachen | 1:51 |
| 8. | "A Place at Your Table" | | | 5:04 |
| 9. | "Nothing but Love" | | | 4:21 |
| 10. | "The Vow" | | | 4:37 |
| 11. | "Your Heart Breaks in All the Right Places" | | | 5:22 |
| 12. | "Thy Will Be Done" | Charlotte Elliott | Justin Smith | 3:48 |
| Total length: | | | | 52:41 |

== Personnel ==
Credits

- All instruments played by Derek Webb
- Additional drums & percussion on ‘Everything Will Change’ by Will Sayles
- Organs on ‘Nothing But Love’ by Joshua Moore
- Additional vocals by Sandra McCracken on ‘I Measure The Days (Simplified Anglican Chant)’ and ‘The Vow’
- String arrangements on ‘Everything Will Change’ & ‘Nothing But Love’ by Ben Shive
- David Angell on violin and John Catchings on cello
- Produced & Recorded by – Derek Webb at Ft. Sumner Studio (Nashville, TN)
- Additional Recording by – Justin March at The Smoakstack (Nashville, TN)
- Mixed by – Shane Wilson at St. Izzy's of the East (Nashville, TN)
- Assisted by – Evan Redwine
- Mix Coordination by – Lani Crump for Showdown Productions
- Mastered by – Jim DeMain @ Yes Master, Nashville, TN
- Art Direction by Derek Webb & Zach McNair
- Design by Zach McNair (zachmcnair.com)
- Photography by Zach McNair
- Assisted by Stephen Hébert
