= How to Kill and Be Killed =

Video / Live album by Derek Webb
- Released: October 11, 2005
- Recorded: Rocketown, Nashville, TN; November 9, 2004
- Genres: Experimental rock Folk; Singer-songwriter; Contemporary Christian music
- Length: 84 minutes (plus Special Features)
- Label: INO Records

Professional ratings
Review scores
Source	Rating
Cross Rhythms	8/10 stars
Digital Tomfoolery	3/5 stars
The Phantom Tollbooth	4/5 stars
Beyond the Turntable	3.5/5 stars

How to Kill and Be Killed (2005) is a live concert DVD from singer-songwriter Derek Webb. The full-band show was recorded at the Nashville performance space Rocketown, at the release party for his second solo studio album, I See Things Upside Down.

== Title ==
The title, "How to Kill and Be Killed," comes from a line in Webb's song "Lover Part 2":

"though I’m cornered by the words I say / You’re telling me to speak / You teach me how to kill and be killed / And how You set me free"

Webb remarked on the theme and meaning behind the phrase, "I've found that often success looks more like failure, riches more like poverty and real life often feels more like death. The Christian life is very literally the process by which we are killed."

== Special features ==
The special features on the DVD include a photo gallery of the concert, and an extended multi-part interview with Webb. Much of what he says foreshadows the message of his follow-up album, 2005's Mockingbird, addressing topics such as politics and religion, the nature of Christian art, and the role the artist plays in society.

== Track listing ==
Track list
No.	Title	Writer(s)	Length
1.	"I Want A Broken Heart"	Derek Webb	5:26
2.	"Thankful"	Webb	4:45
3.	"Saint And Sinner"	Webb	4:28
4.	"Reputation"	Webb	4:41
5.	"Medication"	Webb	5:20
6.	"Somewhere North"	Webb	5:51
7.	"Band Introduction"		3:32
8.	"Can't Lose You"	Webb	5:19
9.	"Blood of the Lamb"	Woody Guthrie	4:00
10.	"Not The Land"	Webb	5:21
11.	"Ballad in Plain Red"	Webb	4:54
12.	"Wedding Dress"	Webb	4:58
13.	"Nothing Is Ever Enough"	Webb	5:02
14.	"Lover Part 2"	Webb	5:48
15.	"I Repent"	Webb	4:55
16.	"Lover"	Webb	4:22
17.	"Awake My Soul"	Sandra McCracken	5:17
Total length:			83:59

== Personnel ==
- Derek Webb – lead vocals, acoustic and electric guitars
- Cason Cooley – vocals, piano, keyboards, guitar, philosophy and theology
- Mark Polack – bass guitar
- Will Sayles – drums and percussion
- Paul Moak – electric guitar, slide guitar, EBow, pedal steel guitar, keyboards, Hammond organ, vibraphone, programming
