= List of Billboard Top Contemporary Christian Albums number ones of the 1990s =

The Billboard Top Contemporary Christian Albums ranks the best-selling Christian music albums of the week in the United States.

== Number ones ==
Key
♪	Best-performing album of the year

Issue date	Album	Artist(s)	Wks.
January 6, 1990	Revival in the Land ♪	Carman	31
August 11, 1990	Beyond Belief	Petra	14
November 17, 1990	Go West Young Man	Michael W. Smith	16
March 9, 1991	For the Sake of the Call	Steven Curtis Chapman	4
April 6, 1991	Go West Young Man ♪	Michael W. Smith	2
April 20, 1991	Heart in Motion	Amy Grant	18
August 24, 1991	Go West Young Man ♪	Michael W. Smith	2
September 7, 1991	Heart in Motion	Amy Grant	4
October 5, 1991	Go West Young Man ♪	Michael W. Smith	4
November 2, 1991	Heart in Motion	Amy Grant	6
December 14, 1991	Addicted to Jesus	Carman	12
March 7, 1992	Unseen Power	Petra	2
March 21, 1992	Addicted to Jesus ♪	Carman	2
April 4, 1992	Unseen Power	Petra	2
April 18, 1992	Addicted to Jesus ♪	Carman	2
May 2, 1992	Unseen Power	Petra	2
May 16, 1992	Go West Young Man	Michael W. Smith	2
May 30, 1992	Addicted to Jesus ♪	Carman	2
June 13, 1992	Heart in Motion	Amy Grant	2
June 27, 1992	Addicted to Jesus ♪	Carman	2
July 11, 1992	Heart in Motion	Amy Grant	2
July 25, 1992	The Great Adventure	Steven Curtis Chapman	12
October 17, 1992	Change Your World	Michael W. Smith	10
December 26, 1992	Home for Christmas	Amy Grant	4
February 23, 1993	Free at Last ♪	dc Talk	22
June 26, 1993	Hope	Michael English	4
July 24, 1993	LeVoyage	Sandi Patti	2
August 7, 1993	Free at Last ♪	dc Talk	2
August 21, 1993	LeVoyage	Sandi Patti	2
September 4, 1993	Free at Last ♪	dc Talk	10
November 13, 1993	The Standard	Carman	2
November 27, 1993	The First Decade	Michael W. Smith	12
February 19, 1994	Beyond a Dream	Twila Paris	10
April 30, 1994	Free at Last ♪	dc Talk	4
May 28, 1994	Beyond a Dream	Twila Paris	6
July 9, 1994	The Standard	Carman	4
August 6, 1994	Heaven in the Real World	Steven Curtis Chapman	18
December 10, 1994	House of Love	Amy Grant	2
December 24, 1994	Heaven in the Real World	Steven Curtis Chapman	2
January 7, 1995	House of Love ♪	Amy Grant	2
January 21, 1995	Heaven in the Real World	Steven Curtis Chapman	4
February 18, 1995	House of Love ♪	Amy Grant	8
April 15, 1995	Kirk Franklin & The Family	Kirk Franklin & The Family	14
July 22, 1995	My Utmost for His Highest	Various artists	7
September 9, 1995	I'll Lead You Home	Michael W. Smith	10
November 18, 1995	R.I.O.T.	Carman	2
December 2, 1995	I'll Lead You Home	Michael W. Smith	1
December 9, 1995	Jesus Freak	dc Talk	13
March 9, 1996	Take Me to Your Leader	Newsboys	2
March 23, 1996	Jesus Freak ♪	dc Talk	1
April 6, 1996	Jars of Clay	Jars of Clay	7
May 18, 1996	Whatcha Lookin' 4	Kirk Franklin & The Family	3
June 6, 1996	Jars of Clay	Jars of Clay	15
September 21, 1996	Signs of Life	Steven Curtis Chapman	1
September 28, 1996	Life Love & Other Mysteries	Point of Grace	1
October 5, 1996	Signs of Life	Steven Curtis Chapman	3
October 26, 1996	Life Love & Other Mysteries	Point of Grace	3
November 16, 1996	Whatcha Lookin' 4	Kirk Franklin & The Family	2
November 30, 1996	WOW 1997	Various artists	3
December 21, 1996	The Gift	Kenny Rogers	4
January 18, 1997	Whatcha Lookin' 4	Kirk Franklin & The Family	12
April 12, 1997	Caedmon's Call	Caedmon's Call	1
April 19, 1997	Whatcha Lookin' 4	Kirk Franklin & The Family	2
May 3, 1997	I Surrender All: 30 Classic Hymns	Carman	1
May 10, 1997	Butterfly Kisses (Shades of Grace)	Bob Carlisle	20
September 27, 1997	You Light Up My Life: Inspirational Songs ♪	LeAnn Rimes	33
May 16, 1998	Live the Life	Michael W. Smith	2
May 30, 1998	You Light Up My Life: Inspirational Songs ♪	LeAnn Rimes	1
June 6, 1998	Live the Life	Michael W. Smith	1
June 13, 1998	You Light Up My Life: Inspirational Songs ♪	LeAnn Rimes	1
June 20, 1998	Jaci Velasquez	Jaci Velasquez	4
July 18, 1998	Step Up to the Microphone	Newsboys	3
August 8, 1998	Jaci Velasquez	Jaci Velasquez	2
August 22, 1998	Steady On	Point of Grace	7
October 10, 1998	Supernatural	dc Talk	1
October 17, 1998	The Nu Nation Project	Kirk Franklin	7
December 12, 1998	Touched by an Angel: The Album	Various artists	4
January 2, 1999	The Prince of Egypt (OST)	Various artists	6
February 13, 1999	The Nu Nation Project ♪	Kirk Franklin	10
April 24, 1999	Songs 4 Life-Feel the Power	Various artists	1
May 1, 1999	40 Acres	Caedmon's Call	1
May 8, 1999	The Nu Nation Project ♪	Kirk Franklin	4
June 5, 1999	Sixpence None the Richer	Sixpence None the Richer	2
June 19, 1999	The Nu Nation Project	Kirk Franklin	2
July 3, 1999	Speechless	Steven Curtis Chapman	5
August 7, 1999	WOW Worship: Blue	Various artists	2
August 21, 1999	Speechless	Steven Curtis Chapman	3
September 11, 1999	Time	Third Day	2
September 25, 1999	Speechless	Steven Curtis Chapman	1
October 2, 1999	Underdog	Audio Adrenaline	1
October 9, 1999	Speechless	Steven Curtis Chapman	2
October 23, 1999	A Christmas Story	Point of Grace	1
October 30, 1999	Speechless	Steven Curtis Chapman	1
November 6, 1999	A Christmas to Remember	Amy Grant	1
November 13, 1999	WOW 2000	Various artists	2
November 27, 1999	If I Left the Zoo	Jars of Clay	1
December 4, 1999	A Christmas to Remember	Amy Grant	1
December 11, 1999	This Is Your Time	Michael W. Smith	1
December 18, 1999	A Christmas to Remember	Amy Grant	2
