= One Zero (Acoustic) =

One Zero [Acoustic]

Compilation album by Derek Webb
- Released: January 30, 2007
- Recorded: Sumner Studio, Nashville, TN
- Genre: Singer-songwriter; Folk; Contemporary Christian music
- Length: 42:16
- Label: INO Records
- Producer: Derek Webb

Derek Webb chronology
Mockingbird (2005)	One Zero [Acoustic] (2007)	One Zero [Remix] (2007)

One Zero [Acoustic] (2007) is an album from Derek Webb containing new acoustic recordings of ten previously released songs. It was released the same day as One Zero (Remix), containing the same ten tracks remixed in an electronic style.

== Track listing ==
No.	Title	Writer(s)	Original album	Length
1.	"Mockingbird"	Derek Webb	from Mockingbird (2005)	4:19
2.	"Better Than Wine"	Webb	from I See Things Upside Down (2004)	4:26
3.	"A King and a Kingdom"	Webb	from Mockingbird (2005)	2:57
4.	"Ballad in Plain Red"	Webb	from I See Things Upside Down (2004)	4:20
5.	"I Hate Everything (But You)"	Webb	from Mockingbird (2005)	4:12
6.	"Wedding Dress"	Webb	from She Must and Shall Go Free (2003)	5:08
7.	"Medication"	Webb	from I See Things Upside Down (2004)	4:11
8.	"Take to The World"	Aaron Tate	from She Must and Shall Go Free (2003)	3:59
9.	"Rich Young Ruler"	Webb	from Mockingbird (2005)	3:55
10.	"Lover"	Webb	from She Must and Shall Go Free (2003)	4:49
Total length:				42:16

== Personnel ==
Band

- Derek Webb – Vocals, Acoustic guitar

Technical

- Produced & Recorded by – Derek Webb @ Sumner Studio, Nashville, TN
- Additional Engineering by – Cason Cooley & Shane D. Wilson
- Mixed by – Shane D. Wilson, Mixed @ Pentavarit
- Mastered by – Jim DeMain @ Yes Master, Nashville, TN
