= Stockholm Syndrome (Derek Webb album) =

Studio album by Derek Webb
- Released: August 31, 2009
- Recorded: Sumner Studio/Fort Sumner Studio, Nashville, TN; The Moore House, Houston, TX; Pozo Hondo Studios, Round Top, TX
- Genres: Synth-pop, Electronica, Christian music
- Length: 51:40
- Label: INO
- Producers: Derek Webb, Joshua Moore

Derek Webb chronology
The Ampersand EP (2008)	Stockholm Syndrome (2009)	Feedback (2010)

Professional ratings
Review scores
Source	Rating
Christianity Today	4/5 stars
AllMusic	3.5/5 stars
Cross Rhythms	9/10 stars
Patrol Magazine	9/10 stars
Jesus Freak Hideout	2/5 stars
Indie Vision Music	7/10 stars
Idobi Radio	4/5 stars
PopMatters	8/10 stars
AbsolutePunk	4/5 stars
RELEVANT	3/5 stars
The Washington Post	3/5 stars
Stereo Subversion	3/5 stars

Stockholm Syndrome is the fifth solo studio album release from singer-songwriter Derek Webb, released in the UK on August 31, 2009, in the US on September 1, and released digitally on September 7. The mostly Electronic album was a radical departure in style from the guitar-driven folk and rock for which he had become known. Themes on the album surround asking difficult questions of Christians on sexuality, race, and social justice. It was critically acclaimed and commercially successful, becoming Webb's first solo album to break into the Billboard Top 200 albums chart.

The album generated controversy for its use of profanity (particularly the use of the word "shit," in the context of a harsh spiritual object lesson in the song "What Matters More") and references to alcohol and sexuality, to the degree that it was originally refused by his record label. After an elaborate online scavenger hunt Webb staged for his fans to "unlock" the song for free distribution, his label conceded to releasing a "clean version" and an "explicit version" of the album, the latter of which was only available directly from Webb at his shows, or by ordering online.

== Background ==
=== Title ===
Webb explains that after The Ringing Bell tour was over, the concept of Stockholm Syndrome kept coming up in conversations and reading. He found it fascinating as a concept: people falling in love with or being infatuated with the forces that oppress them and ultimately want to kill and destroy them. Using it as a grid through which he approached his song writing as an exercise, it ended up becoming a theme for a new album. Webb therefore explored the twisted idea of loving what oppresses us and applied to broader Christian culture, race and sexuality issues, consumerism, and technology.

=== Music ===
Webb left his acoustic, folk/rock roots behind for a sound he described as “intentionally inorganic.” As he said, “I’ve always loved folk music because of its ability to tell the story of the times we’re living live in, in a timeless way. But for me, the best folk music on the scene right now is hip-hop. So with Stockholm Syndrome I wanted to incorporate the more urban and evocative elements of hip-hop." To do that, Webb reunited with former Caedmon's Call bandmate Josh Moore, who since then became an experienced hip-hop writer/producer, to produce the album.

=== Alternate Reality Game and "What Matters More" release ===
In a creative plan to get around the legal issues of releasing "What Matters More" without his label's approval, Webb composed a series of coded emails directing listeners to a secret website where they could piece together the missing track by playing an elaborate alternate reality game. The ARG became so popular that INO Records was forced to embrace Webb's decision to leak the track and distribute it for free online. One of these emails included a code, indicated by random underscores in the text, which was part of a more elaborate set of clues that would lead to the artifacts, including downloads of audio and video clips. Flash drives hidden at coffee shops around the country pointed fans to websites where they could unlock a set of musical "stubs" derived from album tracks. The fans were then responsible for reordering and connecting the audio samples together, to construct the entire song piece by digital piece. Once the song's stubs were all collected, the release announcement for the album was unlocked.

These codes also unlocked the bonus clips and tracks for everyone following the project. The album's launch party continued the theme of secret events by informing (via a Twitter post) alert fans in the audience to ask the bartender for a specific drink. This prompted the bartender to provide them with instructions to wait after the show for a special event. White vans pulled into the venue a few minutes after everyone was instructed to go to a nearby coffee shop for a free listening party. Those who stayed behind were loaded into the vans and taken to Webb's home for a personal concert.

In the liner notes of the album, Webb also used the same underscore code to hide the message "LOVE YOU SM"—presumably referring to his wife, Sandra McCracken.

== Track listing ==
Note: the track listing for the "clean version" does not contain track 6, "What Matters More."

No.	Title	Writer(s)	Length
1.	"Opening Credits"	Derek Webb, Joshua Moore	1:32
2.	"Black Eye"	Webb, Moore	2:54
3.	"Cobra Con"	Webb, Moore	2:59
4.	"Freddie, Please"	Webb, Moore	3:52
5.	"The Spirit vs. the Kick Drum"	Webb, Moore	3:08
6.	"What Matters More"	Webb, Moore	3:03
7.	"The State"	Webb, Moore	4:30
8.	"The Proverbial Gun"	Webb, Moore	3:43
9.	"I Love/Hate You"	Webb, Moore	5:02
10.	"Becoming a Slave"	Webb, Moore	5:22
11.	"Jena & Jimmy"	Webb, Moore	3:25
12.	"Heaven"	Webb, Moore	4:27
13.	"What You Give Up to Get It"	Webb, Moore	3:15
14.	"American Flag Umbrella"	Webb, Moore	4:35
Total length:			51:40

== Personnel ==
- Written, Produced, Performed, and Recorded by – Derek Webb and Joshua Moore
- Recorded at – Sumner/Fort Sumner Studio, Nashville, TN; The Moore House, Houston, TX; and Pozo Hondo Studios, Round Top, TX
- Additional Recording and Editing by – Elise Moore
- Mixed by – Joshua Moore at Sonora Studios, Los Angeles, CA
- Mixing Assisted by – Chris Sczcech, Richard Barron and Chris Constable
- Mastered by – Gavin Lurssen for Lurssen Mastering, Los Angeles, CA
- All instruments played by Derek Webb and Joshua Moore, except for live drums on tracks 1, 3, 5, 10 and 11 played by McKenzie Smith
- Art Direction by – Derek Webb
- Design by – Brannon McAllister
- Photography by – Aaron Greene

== Samples ==
The song "The Spirit vs. the Kick Drum" contains samples of Bert, a character on Sesame Street.

== Charts ==
Chart (2009)	Peak position
US Billboard 200	66
US Top Christian Albums (Billboard)	2
