= The House Show =

Live album by Derek Webb
- Released: June 8, 2004
- Recorded: Weaver Auditorium, University of Mobile, AL; November 21, 2003
- Genre: Singer-songwriter, contemporary Christian music
- Length: 1:05:37
- Label: INO Records
- Producer: Derek Webb

Derek Webb chronology
She Must and Shall Go Free (2003)	The House Show (2004)	I See Things Upside Down (2004)

Professional ratings
Review scores
Source	Rating
Christianity Today	5/5 stars
Cross Rhythms	9/10 stars
RELEVANT	5/5 stars
Faith Writers	5/5 stars
Challies	5/5 stars
cMusicWeb.com	5/5 stars

The House Show (2004) is a live album from singer-songwriter Derek Webb from his House Show tour, following the release of his first solo album, She Must and Shall Go Free.

== Background ==
To provide further interaction with listeners, Webb embarked on the House Show Tour, in which he literally played his concerts in people's houses. That interaction can be heard clearly on The House Show, as nearly every other track is simply Webb speaking about the meaning behind his songs.

As Webb commented in the album liner notes, "For better or for worse, [She Must and Shall Go Free] wasn't an album best suited to big stage production. The songs are more simple than showy, and they have sparked discussion in some unlikely places...Since March 2003, I have played hundreds of these concerts or 'HOUSE SHOWS' – fifty or so people in someone's living room. Just songs and conversations with no production, no press."

== Track listing ==
No.	Title	Writer(s)	Length
1.	"Faith My Eyes"	Derek Webb	6:33
2.	"She Must and Shall Go Free"	William Gadsby (words), Sandra McCracken & Webb (music)	3:16
3.	"Intro to Nobody Loves Me"		5:56
4.	"Nobody Loves Me"	Webb	4:31
5.	"This World"	Aaron Tate	4:04
6.	"Every Grain of Sand"	Bob Dylan	4:48
7.	"Intro to I Repent"		3:31
8.	"I Repent"	Webb	4:05
9.	"Intro to Dance"		5:30
10.	"Dance"	Webb	5:27
11.	"Lover"	Webb	4:20
12.	"Intro to Wedding Dress"		4:55
13.	"Wedding Dress"	Webb	4:38
14.	"Take to the World"	Tate	3:43
Total length:			63:53

== Personnel ==
Band

- Derek Webb – Vocals, Six and 12-string Acoustic guitars

Technical

- Production – Derek Webb
- Recorded by – David Jacquin @ Weaver Auditorium, University of Mobile, AL
- Edited by – Derek Webb and Sandra McCracken
- Mixed by – Jimmy Jernigan, Playground Recording Studios, Nashville, TN
- Mastered by – John Mayfield, Mayfield Mastering, Nashville, TN
- Creative Director – Dana Salsedo
- Art Direction – Derek Webb and Wayne Brezinka
- Design, Layout & Illustrations – Wayne Brezinka
