= Ctrl (Derek Webb album) =

Studio album by Derek Webb
- Released: August 8, 2012
- Studios: Wellhouse Studios, Cedar Hill, Texas; The Moore House. Houston, Texas; Ft. Sumner Studio, Nashville, Tennessee
- Genres: Electronica, contemporary Christian music
- Length: 47:29
- Label: Fair Trade Services
- Producers: Derek Webb, Joshua Moore

Derek Webb chronology
| TN EP (2011) | Ctrl (2012) | I Was Wrong, I'm Sorry & I Love You (2013) |

Ctrl (2012) is the seventh solo studio album release from singer and songwriter Derek Webb. Webb produced the album with his former Caedmon's Call bandmate Joshua Moore, who also co-produced Webb's 2009 album, Stockholm Syndrome.

Ctrl tells the story of an unnamed protagonist who, disenchanted with physical human life, sets out to develop a vision of immortality and life free of pain by ultimately uploading his consciousness into a digital virtual reality. Webb explained, "It's an album about one man's desire for something he cannot have because it isn't real, the journey he goes on pursuing it, and the costs of that journey. But essentially, 'Ctrl' is both personal autopsy and cultural observation about how we use technology to try and control our lives, and my concern that it could ultimately have more control of us."

== Background ==
Webb co-wrote the story behind Ctrl with Moore and television writer and producer Allan Heinberg. The resulting short story that accompanies the album was made available for free on his website.

== Music and lyrics ==
Along with vocals and nylon-string classical guitar, Webb and Moore interspersed drum machines and dense electronic effects. Ctrl features old recordings of Sacred Harp singing, a historical tradition of sacred choral music from the Southern United States related to shape note singing, which is characterized by direct, expressive and sometimes brash voices in 4-part harmony.

== Critical reception ==
Professional ratings
Review scores
| Source | Rating |
|---|---|
| CCM Magazine | 4/5 stars |
| Christianity Today | 3/5 stars |
| Cross Rhythms | 9/10 stars |
| Jesus Freak Hideout | 4/5 stars |
| Jesus Freak Hideout | 4.5/5 stars |
| Louder Than the Music | 4/5 stars |
| New Release Tuesday | 4/5 stars |
| The Phantom Tollbooth | 3.5/5 stars |

== Track listing ==
All tracks are written by Derek Webb.

| No. | Title | Length |
|---|---|---|
| 1. | "And See the Flaming Skies" | 3:57 |
| 2. | "A City With No Name" | 5:23 |
| 3. | "Can't Sleep" | 3:00 |
| 4. | "Blocks" | 6:41 |
| 5. | "Pressing on the Bruise" | 4:57 |
| 6. | "Attonitos Gloria" | 4:58 |
| 7. | "I Feel Everything" | 5:33 |
| 8. | "Reanimate" | 4:19 |
| 9. | "A Real Ghost" | 4:37 |
| 10. | "Around Every Corner" | 4:04 |
| Total length: | | 47:29 |

== Personnel ==
- Derek Webb – producer, performer, recording at Wellhouse Studios, Cedar Hill, Texas, story, art direction
- Joshua Moore – producer, performer, recording, story, mixing at The Moore House, back cover photography
- Allan Heinberg – story
- Travis Brockway – engineer at Ft. Sumner Studio, Nashville, Tennessee
- Matt Reynolds – production assistant
- Latifah Phillips – additional vocals
- Dave Wilton – additional vocals engineer at St. Ida's, Lafayette, Colorado
- Bob Boyd – mastering at Ambient Digital<, Houston, Texas
- McKenzie Smith – live drums
- Jordan Brooke Hamlin – woodwinds, vibraphone, woodwinds and vibraphone engineer at Gingerwood Studio, Nashville, Tennessee
- Jon Dicus – design
- Josh Oakes – cover design
- Jon Dicus – cover design
- Zach McNair – inside portrait photography
- David McCollum – inside photo photography

== Charts ==
| Chart (2009) | Peak position |
|---|---|
| US Top Christian Albums (Billboard) | 9 |
