= Wedding dress (disambiguation) =

A wedding dress is a clothing worn by a bride during a wedding ceremony.

Wedding dress may also refer to:

- Wedding Dress (film), a 2009 South Korean film
- "Wedding Dress" (Onyanko Club song), 1987
- "Wedding Dress" (Taeyang song), 2009
- "Wedding Dress," a song by Mark Lanegan from his album Bubblegum
- "Wedding Dress," a song by Derek Webb from his album She Must and Shall Go Free
- "Wedding Dress," a song by Sam Amidon from his album All Is Well
