= Love Alone =

Love Alone may refer to:

- "Love Alone", single by Trisha Yearwood (Dan Colehour, David Grissom) from Love Songs 2008
- "Love Alone", song by Utopia from Adventures in Utopia 1979
- "Love Alone", song by Charlotte Church from Four 2014
- "Love Alone", song by Caedmon's Call from Long Line of Leavers 2000
- "Love Alone", song by Sam Mangubat
- "Love Alone", song by Chinese group Miss A from A Class
- "Love Alone", song by Korean group Melody Day
- "Love Alone", song by Korean singer UI from Palette
