= Mockingbird (Derek Webb album) =

Studio album by Derek Webb
- Released: December 26, 2005
- Recorded: Sumner Studio, Nashville, Tennessee
- Genres: Singer-songwriter, folk, contemporary Christian music
- Length: 40:26
- Label: INO
- Producers: Derek Webb, Cason Cooley

Derek Webb chronology
I See Things Upside Down (2004)	Mockingbird (2005)	One Zero (Acoustic) (2007)

Professional ratings
Review scores
Source	Rating
CCM Magazine	A
Christian Broadcasting Network	4.5/5 stars
Christianity Today	4.5/5 stars
Cross Rhythms	9/10 stars
Indie Vision Music	9/10 stars
Jesus Freak Hideout	4/5 stars
New Release Tuesday	4/5 stars
Relevant	8/10 stars

Mockingbird (2005) is the third solo studio album from singer-songwriter Derek Webb.

Produced by Cason Cooley, the album touches on subjects such as politics, social justice, and war with heavy use of satire and irony. Webb has stated that he tackled these subjects to stimulate discussion and engage people to bring about changes in what he sees as some of the greatest problems the world is facing today. The Work of the People (a community of artists, storytellers, filmmakers, poets and theologians) created a music video for Webb's song A New Law which is available for viewing on their website.

To broaden this discussion to people less inclined to purchase his album, beginning September 1, 2006, Webb offered Mockingbird for free on the website www.freederekwebb.com, where it was available for download until December 1, 2006. Over 80,000 free copies of the album were downloaded during this time.

== Track listing ==
No.	Title	Writer(s)	Guest musician(s)	Length
1.	"Mockingbird"	Derek Webb	Jordan Brooke Hamlin, David Henry	4:15
2.	"A New Law"	Webb	Henry	4:46
3.	"A King & A Kingdom"	Webb		3:03
4.	"I Hate Everything (But You)"	Sandra McCracken, Webb	Hamlin	4:22
5.	"Rich Young Ruler"	Webb	McCracken	3:55
6.	"A Consistent Ethic of Human Life"	Webb	Hamlin, Henry	0:25
7.	"My Enemies Are Men Like Me"	Webb		5:16
8.	"Zeros & Ones"	Webb	Hamlin, Henry	3:51
9.	"In God We Trust"	Webb	Henry	4:35
10.	"Please, Before I Go"	Webb	Hamlin, Henry	2:48
11.	"Love Is Not Against the Law"	Webb	Hamlin, Henry	3:10
Total length:				40:26

== Personnel ==
Band

- Derek Webb – vocals, acoustic guitar, bells (tracks 3, 5, 8, 10), Mellotron (track 7)
- Cason Cooley – piano, mellotron (tracks 3, 5, 7), bells (tracks 4, 6, 11), Rhodes piano (tracks 4 & 5), electric guitar (track 5)
- Mark Polack – bass guitar
- Will Sayles – drums, percussion

Additional musicians

- Jordan Brooke Hamlin – French horn (tracks 1, 4, 6, 8, 10, 11), trumpet (tracks 4, 6, 10, 11)
- David Henry – cello (tracks 1, 2, 6, 8, 9, 10, 11)
- Sandra McCracken – vocals (track 9), acoustic guitar (track 5)

Technical

- Derek Webb – producer, additional engineer, design concept, direction
- Cason Cooley – producer
- Shane D. Wilson – engineer, mixing
- Peter Carlson – assistant engineer
- Sandra McCracken – additional engineer
- Jim DeMain – mastering
- Sumner Studio, Nashville, Tennessee – recording location* Cason Cooley – additional engineer
- Pentavarit – mixing location
- Yes Master, Nashville, Tennessee – mastering location
- Chris Richards – illustration for www.cerichards.net
- Wayne Brezinka – design, layout for www.brezinkadesign.com

== Awards and accolades ==
Mockingbird was named the No. 7 "Best Christian Album of 2006" by Christianity Today magazine.

== Charts ==
Chart (2006)	Peak position
US Heatseekers Albums (Billboard)	42
US Top Christian Albums (Billboard)	41
