= Waterdeep (band) =

American band

- Origin: Kansas City, Missouri, U.S.
- Members: Don Chaffer; Lori Chaffer
- Past members: Brandon Graves; Christena Graves; UJ Pessenon; Anthony Case; Jay Pfeifer; Kenny Carter
- Website: www.waterdeep.com

Waterdeep is a band from Kansas City, Missouri that is now based in Nashville, Tennessee. It is made up of husband and wife songwriters Don and Lori Chaffer.

== History ==
The band was formed in 1995. Upon completion of Don's solo album You Were at the Time for Love, they released their debut album To Chase Away the Birds. Their early lineup consisted of Don Chaffer as well as bassist Anthony Case, keyboardist Jay Pfeifer, and drummer Brandon Graves. Chaffer's wife, singer/guitarist Lori Coscia, joined Waterdeep in 1996, with the group's second album Sink or Swim appearing the following year.

They signed with Squint Entertainment in 1998 and released Everyone's Beautiful in 1999 which debuted at #23 on Billboard's Top Christian Albums 100. In the meantime the band recorded and released an independent record in 1999 called Enter the Worship Circle. It was an acoustic collaboration with the members of 100 Portraits. Also that year, they recorded and released Live at the New Earth, which documented the final performances with Case and Pfeifer. Meanwhile, the line up changed, with Kenny Carter on bass and Brandon Graves' wife, Christena, on keyboards.

Their second album on Squint was You Are So Good to Me, released in 2001. It debuted at No. 6 on Billboard's Top Internet Album Sales for the week of May 19, 2001. The title track, written by Don Chaffer, was released by Christian band Third Day and debuted as No. 1 on the Hot Christian Songs 40.

Don Chaffer went on to record a pair of solo efforts entitled Whole 'Nother Deal and What You Don't Know, both released in 2002. Lori Chaffer released her first solo record, 1beginning, in 2003.

Soon after that, both the Chaffers and Graves had children and Waterdeep decreased the number of shows it played per year. Eventually the band whittled itself down to just the Chaffers. They continued making records as solo artists and as the band Waterdeep, but first they embarked on a two CD series for a book project called The Voice. Don gathered various artists to write and sing songs based on the Psalms. He then got as many fellow artists as he could get to come record the songs live in the studio. Some of the artists involved (either writing or performing) were: Matt Wertz, Stephen Mason, Sara Groves, Derek Webb, Sandra McCracken, Steven Delopoulos, Matthew Perryman Jones, Robbie Seay, Andrew Osenga and Phil Keaggy.

In 2006 Don made a record by the fictitious band named The Khrusty Brothers. It was a mix of folk and techno, and the back story caught the attention of Steve Day, a fan in New York City who thought it would make a great musical. Don, up for the challenge, ended up writing it with Chris Cragin Day and solicited the help of Lori to finish up some of the songs. Son of a Gun, as it eventually was called, won the acclaimed Eugene O'Neill Theatre workshop in 2011 and saw a three-week showcase production in November 2012 in New York City at Theatre Row.

In late 2007, Waterdeep got back to business making records on a more regular basis. Heart Attack Time Machine was something of a return to stripped-down folk music, only this time loops were used along with a variety of instruments. Early 2008 brought Pink & Blue, made up of two EPs, one of Don's songs, the other of Lori's. It contained a few song sketches under two minutes. In the Middle of It was released in 2009 and was a bit more experimental than recent efforts, pulling from their memories of growing up in the 80s. The band's most recent record, No Doubt of Sunshine, was released December 2011. "It's Alright" was placed on an episode of One Tree Hill in January 2012.

Don was primarily a record producer and a songwriter with Simpleville Music, Inc, but now teaches music at Lipscomb University. Lori is a record producer. They live in Nashville with their two children.

== Discography ==
=== Albums ===
- To Chase Away the Birds (1995)
- Sink or Swim (1997)
- Enter the Worship Circle (with 100 Portraits)(1999)
- Live at the New Earth (1998)
- Dogpaddle (1998)-made for fan club
- Everyone's Little CD (1998)-Made for "Everyone's Festival"-One pressing only
- Everyone's Beautiful (1999)-Squint Entertainment
- Waterdeep Worship: You Are So Good to Me (2001)-Squint Entertainment
- Whole 'Nother Deal (2002)
- Live 3.26.03-Muncie, Indiana (2004)
- Heart Attack Time Machine (2007)
- Pink & Blue (2008)
- In the Middle of It (2010)
- The Collection (2010)-Greatest hits compilation
- No Doubt of Sunshine (2011)
- Moment (2013)
- Waterdeep (2014)
- Tandem (2020)

=== Side projects ===
- Old Stuff-Hey Ruth (a collection of Don and Lori's early solo work and from their early band "Hey Ruth" from 1991–1993)
- You Were at the Time for Love-Don Chaffer (1994)
- You Remain-Christena Graves (1998)
- What You Don't Know-Don Chaffer (2002)
- 1Beginning-Lori Chaffer (2003)
- Songs from the Voice Vol. 1: Please Don't Make Us Sing This Song (2006) (A compilation album produced by Don Chaffer with performances by Don and Lori and others. Released with The Voice project by Nelson Publishing.)
- Songs from the Voice Vol. 2: Son of the Most High (2006)
- The Khrusty Brothers (2007)
- An Unfinished Tale, Vol. 1-Beauty-Don Chaffer (2010)
- An Unfinished Tale, Vol. 2-Truth-Don Chaffer (2011)
