= Forty Acres =

Forty Acres may be:

- 40 Acres (album), the 1999 release from Caedmon's Call
- 40 Acres (film), a 2024 Canadian thriller film
- Forty acres and a mule, a term for compensation that was supposedly to be awarded to freed slaves after the American Civil War
- RKO Forty Acres, a former film studio backlot
- Forty Acres is the nickname of the original "College Hill" located within the Campus of The University of Texas at Austin
- The Forty Acres, the United Farm Workers compound founded by Cesar Chavez and designated a National Historic Landmark
- A quarter of a quarter-section in the United States Public Land Survey System
