= Best Laid Plans =

Best Laid Plans may refer to:

== Film ==
- Best Laid Plans (1999 film), an American crime film
- Best Laid Plans (2012 film), a British film based on Of Mice and Men

== Television ==
- The Best Laid Plans (TV series), a 2014 Canadian sitcom based on the Fallis novel of the same name
- "Best Laid Plans" (Agents of S.H.I.E.L.D.), a 2018 episode
- "Best Laid Plans" (Burn Notice) a 2012 episode
- "The Best Laid Plans" (Degrassi Junior High), a 1987 episode
- "Best Laid Plans" (Friday Night Lights), a 2007 episode
- "Best Laid Plans" (Once Upon a Time), a 2015 episode
- "The Best Laid Plans" (Three's Company), a 1979 episode
- "Best Laid Plans" (The Unit), a 2009 episode
- "Best Laid Plans", an episode from the second season of the animated web TV series Voltron: Legendary Defender
- "Best Laid Plans...", an episode from the web series Critical Role
- "Best Laid Plans", an episode from Atypical

== Literature ==
- The Best Laid Plans (novel), a 1997 novel by Sidney Sheldon
- The Best Laid Plans, a 2008 novel by Terry Fallis
- Best Laid Plans (comics), a comic book story

== Music ==
- Best Laid Plans (Sandra McCracken album)
- Best Laid Plans (David Torn album)
- "Best Laid Plans", a 2010 song by James Blunt from Some Kind of Trouble
- "Best Laid Plans", a song by the Beths from Straight Line Was a Lie

== See also ==
- "To a Mouse", a 1785 poem by Robert Burns, whose title is often misquoted as "The best-laid plans of mice and men oft go awry"
