= Feedback (Derek Webb album) =

Studio album by Derek Webb
- Released: November 2, 2010
- Studios: Ft. Sumner Studio (Nashville, TN); The Moore House (Houston, TX); Ponzo Hondo Studios (Round Top, TX); Hyde Park Studio (Houston, TX)
- Genres: Electronic, instrumental, contemporary Christian music
- Length: 36:49
- Label: Fair Trade Services
- Producers: Derek Webb, Joshua Moore

Derek Webb chronology
Stockholm Syndrome (2009)	Feedback (2010)	TN EP (2011)

Professional ratings
Review scores
Source	Rating
CCM Magazine	4/5 stars
Christianity Today	4/5 stars
Cross Rhythms	3/10 stars
Jesus Freak Hideout	4.5/5 stars
The Phantom Tollbooth	3.5/5 stars

Feedback (2010) is the sixth solo studio album release from singer and songwriter Derek Webb. It is Webb's first worship album: an instrumental, electronic music recording, classically composed into three movements, based strictly on the structure and content of the Lord's Prayer from the Gospel of Matthew. Along with the music, Feedback encompassed additional artistic projects from photographer Jeremy Cowart, painter Scott Erickson, and filmmaker Scott Brignac.

== Awards and accolades ==
Derek Webb was nominated for "Inspirational Album of the Year" for Feedback at the 2012 43rd GMA Dove Awards.

== Track listing ==
Movement 1
No.	Title	Writer(s)	Length
1.	"Our Father In Heaven"	Derek Webb, Sandra McCracken	3:24
2.	"Hallowed Is Your Name"	Webb, McCracken	2:30
3.	"Your Kingdom Come"	Webb, McCracken	3:33

Movement 2
No.	Title	Writer(s)	Length
4.	"Your Will Be Done On Earth As In Heaven"	Webb, McCracken	7:28
5.	"Give Us This Day Our Daily Bread"	Webb, McCracken	2:52
6.	"Forgive Our Debts As We Forgive Our Debtors"	Webb, McCracken	3:14

Movement 3
No.	Title	Writer(s)	Length
7.	"Lead Us Not Into Temptation But Deliver Us From Evil"	Webb, McCracken	6:23
8.	"For Thine Is: A) The Kingdom B) The Power C) The Glory..."	Webb, McCracken	6:28
9.	"Amen"	Webb, McCracken	0:59

== Personnel ==
- Produced and recorded by Derek Webb & Joshua Moore
- All songs composed by Derek Webb & Sandra McCracken
- Performed and programmed by Derek Webb,
  Sandra McCracken, & Joshua Moore
- Recorded at Ft. Sumner Studio (Nashville, TN)
  The Moore House (Houston, TX)
  Ponzo Hondo Studios (Round Top, TX)
  Hyde Park Studio (Houston, TX)
- Additional recording by Matt Outlaw
- Mixed by Joshua Moore at The Moore House & Pozo Hondo Studios
- Mastered by Bob Boyd at Ambient Digital (Houston, TX)
- Art Direction by Derek Webb & Brannon McAllister
- Design by Brannon McAllister
- Photographs by Jeremy Cowart
- Paintings by Scott Erickson
