= Caedmon's Call (album) =

Studio album by Caedmon's Call
- Released: March 25, 1997
- Studios: Nickel & Dime Studios (Avondale Estates, Georgia)
- Genres: Rock music, Christian rock
- Length: 54:35
- Label: Warner Alliance
- Producer: Don McCollister

Caedmon's Call chronology
Just Don't Want Coffee (1995)	Caedmon's Call (1997)	Limited Edition Tour EP (1997)

Professional ratings
Review scores
Source	Rating
AllMusic	4/5 stars
Cross Rhythms	10/10 squares
Jesus Freak Hideout	3.5/5 stars

Caedmon's Call is the first major release from Houston, Texas-based outfit Caedmon's Call. It was recorded at Nickel & Dime Studios in Avondale Estates, Georgia.

== Track listing ==
1. "Lead of Love" (Aaron Tate) – 3:58
2. "Close of Autumn" (Derek Webb) – 4:56
3. "Not the Land" (Webb) – 5:05
4. "This World" (Tate) – 3:59
5. "Bus Driver" (Webb) – 4:57
6. "Standing up for Nothing" (Webb) – 4:58
7. "Hope to Carry On" (Rich Mullins) – 2:49
8. "Stupid Kid" (Webb) – 4:03
9. "I Just Don't Want Coffee" (Webb) – 6:00
10. "Not Enough" (Tate) – 3:42
11. "Center Aisle" (Webb) – 5:47
12. "Coming Home" (Tate) – 4:21

== Personnel ==
Caedmon's Call

- Cliff Young – vocals (1, 3–8, 10, 12), guitars (1–4, 7, 10, 12)
- Danielle Glenn – vocals (1–4, 6–10, 12)
- Derek Webb – vocals (1, 3–8), guitars (1–11), acoustic guitar (12), electric guitar (12)
- Randy Holsapple – Hammond organ (1, 6, 7, 9, 10, 12)
- Aric Nitzberg – bass (1–9, 12), upright bass (4, 5, 10)
- Todd Bragg – drums (1–10, 12)
- Garett Buell – percussion (1–5, 7–10, 12)

Guest musicians

- Brandon Bush – accordion (4), tack piano (5), Wurlitzer electric piano (8), Farfisa organ (8)
- Don McCollister – 12-string guitar (1), backing vocals (2, 8), string arrangements (6)
- Jane Scarpantoni – cello (4, 6, 10), string arrangements (4)
- Shiela Doyle – violin (4)
- Buddy Ottosen – human air brakes (7)
- Lori Chaffer – backing vocals (2)

Production

- Wayne Watson – executive producer
- Don McCollister – producer, engineer, mixing, editing at Orphan Studios (Avondale Estates, Georgia)
- Brandon Bush – assistant engineer
- Louis Lovely – assistant engineer
- Glenn Matulo – additional editing
- Scott Hull – mastering at Masterdisk (New York City, New York)
- Buddy Jackson – art direction
- Karinne Caulkins – cover type artwork, back cover artwork
- Hound Dog Studio – package design
- Michael Wilson – photography
- Grassroots Artist Management – management

== Release details ==
- 1997, U.S., Warner Alliance 9362-46463-2, Release Date March 25, 1997, CD
