= Back Home (Caedmon's Call album) =

Studio album by Caedmon's Call
- Released: February 4, 2003
- Recorded: 2003
- Studios: Ocean Way Nashville, Emerald Masterfonics and Sixteenth Avenue Sound (Nashville, Tennessee); Second Studios, Joshmooreownsthis Studio and Ambient Digital (Houston, Texas); Red House Sound (New York City, New York)
- Genres: Rock music, Christian rock
- Length: 50:08
- Label: Essential
- Producers: Caedmon's Call; Joshua Moore; Ben Wisch

Caedmon's Call chronology
In the Company of Angels (2001)	Back Home (2003)	Chronicles 1992-2004 (2004)

Professional ratings
Review scores
Source	Rating
Jesus Freak Hideout	(not rated)

Back Home is the fifth major album release from Caedmon's Call.

== Track listing ==
1. "Only Hope" – 2:54 (Randall Goodgame, Charles Wesley)
2. "You Created" – 3:27 (Joshua Moore)
3. "Walk with Me" – 4:19 (Sandra McCracken)
4. "Hands of the Potter" – 3:51 (Goodgame)
5. "The Emptiest Day" – 3:51 (Moore, Matthew Perryman Jones)
6. "The Kingdom" – 4:30 (Moore)
7. "Beautiful Mystery" – 3:26 (Cliff Young, Aaron Tate, Derek Webb)
8. "The High Countries" – 5:21 (McCracken)
9. "Thousand Miles" – 3:21 (Aaron Senseman)
10. "Never Gonna Let Go" – 3:17 (Moore, Steve Hindalong, Marc Byrd)
11. "Awake My Soul" – 3:57 (McCracken)
12. "Manner and Means" – 4:42 (McCracken)
13. "Mystery of Mercy" – 3:12 (Goodgame, Andrew Peterson)

== Personnel ==
Caedmon's Call

- Cliff Young – vocals, acoustic guitar
- Derek Webb – vocals, acoustic guitar, electric guitars, banjo
- Danielle Young – vocals
- Joshua Moore – acoustic piano, keyboards, Hammond B3 organ, accordion, programming, acoustic guitar, acoustic 12-string guitar, high-string acoustic guitar, electric guitars, dobro, mandolin, MalletKAT, backing vocals
- Jeff Miller – bass
- Todd Bragg – drums, percussion
- Garett Buell – percussion, MalletKAT, berimbau, cuica, tongue drum, tabla, udu, loops

Guest musicians

- Blair Masters – string arrangements and orchestration (2, 6)
- Carl Gordetzky – conductor (2, 6)
- The Nashville String Machine – strings (2, 6)
- Sandra McCracken – backing vocals (3), acoustic guitar (12)
- Aaron Senseman – backing vocals (9)
- Paul Moak – electric guitars (10)

Production

- Robert Beeson – executive producer
- Bob Wohler – executive producer
- Caedmon's Call – producers
- Joshua Moore – producer, additional recording
- Ben Wisch – producer, recording (2–9, 11, 12), mixing (2–12)
- David Hall – recording (1, 10, 13)
- Bob Boyd – mixing (1, 13), additional recording, mastering at Ambient Digital (Houston, Texas)
- Donnie Boutwell – additional recording, assistant engineer
- Bryan Graban – assistant engineer
- Greg Lawrence – assistant engineer
- Leslie Richter – assistant engineer
- Christie Bragg – production coordinator
- Michelle Pearson – A&R production
- Tim Parker – art direction, design, additional photography
- David Dobson – artist photography
- David Perry – cover photography
- Ron Roark – additional photography

== Release details ==
- 2003, US, Essential records 83061-0694-2, Release Date February 4, 2003, CD
