= In the Company of Angels =

Studio album by Caedmon's Call
- Released: September 25, 2001
- Studios: Sunrise Studios, Houston, Texas; Second Studios, Houston, Texas; Second Baptist Church Houston, Texas; Recording Arts, Nashville, Tennessee; Earful Studios, Franklin, Tennessee
- Genres: Rock, Christian rock
- Length: 46:57
- Label: Essential
- Producers: Joshua Moore, Bob Boyd, Caedmon's Call

Caedmon's Call chronology
| The Guild Collection Vol. 3 (2001) | In the Company of Angels (2001) | Back Home (2003) |

Professional ratings
Review scores
| Source | Rating |
|---|---|
| AllMusic | 3/5 stars |

In the Company of Angels is a studio album from Caedmon's Call released in the United States on September 25, 2001, through Essential Records. This more than any other previous album by this band features songs of worship.

== Track listing ==
1. "We Delight" – 3:25 (Joshua Moore)
2. "Before There Was Time" – 3:32 (Aaron Senseman, Cliff Young)
3. "Thy Mercy" – 2:43 (John Stocker, Sandra McCracken)
4. "God Who Saves" – 4:57 (Senseman)
5. "Who You Are" – 3:03 (Moore)
6. "Carry Your Love" – 4:24 (Senseman, Young)
7. "God of Wonders" – 4:05 (Steve Hindalong, Marc Byrd)
8. "I Boast No More" – 4:32 (Isaac Watts, McCracken)
9. "Oh Lord Your Love" – 3:44 (Young, Rich Mullins)
10. "Warrior" – 3:36 (Kemper Crabb)
11. "Laden With Guilt" – 3:41 (Watts, McCracken)
12. "The Danse" – 5:15 (Crabb)

== Personnel ==
Caedmon's Call

- Cliff Young – vocals, acoustic guitars
- Derek Webb – vocals, acoustic guitars, electric guitars
- Danielle Young – vocals
- Joshua Moore – acoustic piano, Rhodes electric piano, Wurlitzer electric piano, synthesizers, Hammond B3 organ, accordion, acoustic guitars, high-strung acoustic guitar, electric guitars, orchestra bells, string arrangements, backing vocals
- Jeff Miller – bass, backing vocals
- Todd Bragg – drums, percussion, didgeridoo
- Garett Buell – drums, percussion, timpani, drum programming

Guest musicians

- Ed Cash – guitars (1, 2, 4, 5, 9), backing vocals (1, 2, 4, 5, 9), banjo (3), mandolin (3, 4), string orchestration (3), acoustic piano (9), Rhodes electric piano (9), percussion (9)
- Rodney Black – electric guitar (5)
- Kemper Crabb – mandolin (10)
- Derri Daugherty – mando-guitar (12)
- Steve Levine – penny whistle (12)
- Chris McDonald – string orchestration (1, 5)
- The Nashville String Machine – strings (1, 5)

Gospel choir (Tracks 6 & 8)

- Rev David I. Bennett – choir director
- Esther I. Bennett
- Angelique Gibbs
- Josette Harrison
- Clytel R. Helms
- Nathan L. Owens
- Tans Perkins
- Cozer Sidney

=== Production ===
- Robert Beeson – executive producer
- Bob Wohler – executive producer
- Caedmon's Call – producers
- Ed Cash – producer (1, 2, 4, 5, 9)
- Bob Boyd – producer (3, 6–8, 10, 11),
- Joshua Moore – producer (3, 6–8, 10, 11)
- Steve Hindalong – producer (12)
- Michelle Pearson – A&R production coordinator
- Ron Roark – art direction, graphic design
- Jordyn Thomas – art direction
- Cliff Young – art direction
- Kim Thomas – concepts, illustrations
- Tim Parker – cover illustration
- David Dobson – photography
- Lisa Capuchino – hair, make-up
- Christie Bragg – management

Technical credits

- Bob Boyd – mastering, recording (1–6, 8–12), mixing (3, 4, 6–11)
- Ben Wisch – mixing (1, 2, 5)
- Mark Sepulveda – engineer (7)
- Derri Daugherty – recording (12)
- David Schober – mixing (12)
- Justin Loucks – additional recording
- Jacob Meader – additional recording
- Joshua Moore – additional recording
- Chris Townsell – additional recording
- Grant Greene – mix assistant (1, 2, 5)

Studios

- Recorded at Sunrise Studios and Second Studios (Houston, Texas).
- Mixed and Mastered at Ambient Digital (Houston, Texas)
- "God of Wonders" recorded live at Texas A&M University.
- "Warrior" recorded live at Second Baptist Church Houston (Houston, Texas).
- "The Danse" recorded at Earful Studios (Franklin, Tennessee); Mixed at Dark Horse Recording Studio (Franklin, Tennessee).
