= In the Company of Angels II =

In the Company of Angels II: The World Will Sing

Studio album by Caedmon's Call
- Released: March 7, 2006
- Studios: Second Studio and Ambient Digital (Houston, Texas); Sounds Arts Recording Studio and The Velvet Eagle (Nashville, Tennessee)
- Genres: Rock music, Christian rock
- Length: 41:54
- Label: Essential
- Producers: Caedmon's Call; Bob Boyd

Caedmon's Call chronology
| Share the Well (2004) | In the Company of Angels II: The World Will Sing (2006) | Thankful: The Best of Caedmon's Call (2007) |

Professional ratings
Review scores
| Source | Rating |
|---|---|
| AllMusic | 3/5 stars |

In the Company of Angels II: The World Will Sing is the seventh major release from Caedmon's Call. It was released on March 7, 2006 through Essential Records.

== Background ==
In 2001 acoustic folk/pop group Caedmon's Call released In The Company of Angels: A Call to Worship. The album was celebrated as one of the best selling titles in the Caedmon's catalog, scanning 250,000 units to date. Caedmon's followed up with In the Company Of Angels 2: The World Will Sing featuring a blend of familiar praise and worship choruses, along with original songs written by the band. To this day the members of Caedmon’s Call have remained active in their home churches, this project takes that experience to a national platform. While In the Company of Angels: A Call to Worship focused on a local community of believers, In the Company of Angels 2: The World Will Sing illustrates the band's heart for sharing and ministering to the rest of the world.

== Track listing ==
1. "Great and Mighty" - 4:07 (Aaron Senseman, Cliff Young, Joshua Moore)
2. "Draw Me Nearer" - 4:18 (Fanny Crosby, Diane Sheets, Moore)
3. "Sing His Love" - 3:24 (Francis P. Jones, Andrew Osenga)
4. "Rest Upon Us" - 3:09 (Laura Story, Osenga)
5. "The Story" - 4:01 (Osenga)
6. "The Fountain" - 3:06 (Moore)
7. "Be Merciful to Me" - 3:33 (Randall Goodgame, Henry Baker)
8. "I Surrender All" - 3:54 (Judson W. Van DeVenter, Moore)
9. "We Give Thanks" - 3:31 (Osenga)
10. "Fellowship So Deep" - 4:22 (Senseman, Kinley Lange)
11. "Let Me Be" - 4:29 (Senseman)

== Personnel ==
Caedmon's Call

- Cliff Young – vocals, guitars
- Danielle Young – vocals
- Andrew Osenga – vocals, guitars
- Joshua Moore – acoustic piano, Hammond B3 organ
- Jeff Miller – bass
- Todd Bragg – drums
- Garett Buell – percussion

Guest musicians

- Randall Goodgame – acoustic piano (7)
- Aaron Senseman – electric guitar (1), backing vocals (1)
- Michelle Avery – backing vocals (5)
- Matt Odmark – backing vocals (5)
- Alison Osenga – backing vocals (5)
- Brandon Whiteside – backing vocals (5)

Production

- Robert Beeson – executive producer
- Jordyn Conner – executive producer
- Caedmon's Call – producers
- Bob Boyd – producer, recording, mixing, mastering
- Taylor Lee – recording
- Elise Morrison – recording
- Andrew Osenga – recording
- David Grant – second engineer
- Brandon Whiteside – second engineer
- Tim Parker – art direction
- Ron Roark – art direction, graphic design
- David Dobson – photography
- Christie Bragg – management
