= Share the Well =

Studio album by Caedmon's Call
- Released: 12 October 2004
- Studios: India, Ecuador, Houston, Franklin, Tennessee
- Genres: Rock music, Christian rock
- Length: 55:31
- Label: Essential
- Producers: Caedmon's Call, Joshua Moore

Caedmon's Call chronology
Chronicles 1992-2004 (2004)	Share the Well (2004)	In the Company of Angels II: The World Will Sing (2006)

Professional ratings
Review scores
Source	Rating
AllMusic	3.5/5 stars

Share the Well is the sixth major release from Caedmon's Call. It was released on October 12, 2004 through Essential Records.

Inspired by the band's trip to India, Brazil and Ecuador, Share the Well explores universal Christian themes in a variety of geographies, with songs that look through the eyes of both visitor and resident. Major themes include God's all-sufficient goodness, the need for people to share what they have with each other, and the inherent dignity of the oppressed; in particular the Dalit caste of India.

This album was recorded in:

- OLIO – Lucknow, Uttar Pradesh, India
- Puerto Lago – Otavalo, San Pablo Lake, Ecuador
- Dark Horse Recording – Franklin, Tennessee
- The Moore's House – Houston, Texas
- Second Studios – Houston, Texas

and also

- domestic locations in Ecuador
- domestic locations in Brazil
- Sunrise Studios – Houston, Texas
- The Velvet Eagle – Nashville, Tennessee
- Masterphonics Tracking Room – Nashville, Tennessee

== Track listing ==
1. "Intro" – 0:26
2. "Share the Well" – 3:09 (Randall Goodgame)
3. "There's Only One (Holy One)" – 3:42 (Goodgame)
4. "Jenny Farza" – 0:40
5. "Mother India" – 4:48 (Andrew Osenga, Goodgame)
6. "International Love Song" – 3:06 (Joshua Moore, Osenga, Goodgame)
7. "All I Need (I Did Not Catch Her Name)" – 3:33 (Goodgame)
8. "Los Hermanos Count Off" – 0:26
9. "Volcanoland" – 3:47 (Moore)
10. "The Roses" – 4:00 (Osenga, Jeff Miller)
11. "Mirzapur Group" – 0:26
12. "Bombay Rain" – 2:46 (Osenga)
13. "The Innocent's Corner" – 5:01 (Moore)
14. "Sarala" – 2:20 (Goodgame, Osenga, Cliff Young)
15. "Punjabi Group with Joseph D'Souza" – 0:54
16. "Wings of the Morning" – 4:46 (Osenga, Moore)
17. "Dalit Hymn" – 11:41 (Moore, Goodgame)
- (The album's last track features two hidden tracks: A brief solo song by Andrew Osenga, possibly titled "I Miss You", and as a longer excerpt of the Mirzapur Group performance heard earlier in the album.)
- The album featured only one other song sung by Andrew Osenga, "Bombay Rain".

== Personnel ==
Caedmon's Call

- Cliff Young – lead vocals, backing vocals, acoustic guitar
- Danielle Young – lead vocals, backing vocals
- Andrew Osenga – lead vocals, backing vocals, acoustic guitar, electric guitar, dobro, keyboard bass
- Joshua Moore – acoustic piano, Hammond B3 organ, synthesizers, harmonium, accordion, acoustic guitar, electric guitar, nylon guitar, high-strung guitar, bass guitar, kalimba, tamboor, dholak, string orchestration, backing vocals
- Jeff Miller – bass
- Todd Bragg – drums, surdo, pandeiro, tamborim
- Garett Buell – percussion, tabla, dholak, manjira, congas, bongos, cajon, djembe, surdo, ganzá, udu, agogô, ankle bells, handclaps

Guest musicians

- Solomon Raju – harmonium
- Humberto Aigaje – guitars, flutes, pan flute
- David Tugulinago – guitars
- Samuel Tugulinago – guitars, high-strung guitar, charango, pan flute
- Ze DeFaria – surdo, ankle bells, repinique, pandeiro, handclaps
- Jayant Jaypur Walle – tabla
- Efrain Tugulinago – flutes, pan flute
- Jenny Farza – backing vocals
- Samson Manwatkar – backing vocals
- Pastor Yuhanna – backing vocals
- The Mirzapur Group (Dalit Music Team) – vocals

== Production ==
- Bob Wohler – executive producer
- Caedmon's Call – producers
- Joshua Moore – producer
