= One Zero (Remix) =

One Zero [Remix]

Remix album by Derek Webb
- Released: January 30, 2007
- Genre: Contemporary Christian music
- Label: INO Records

Derek Webb chronology
One Zero [Acoustic] (2007)	One Zero [Remix] (2007)	The Ringing Bell (2007)

One Zero [Remix] (2007) is an album from Derek Webb containing tracks of ten previously released Derek Webb songs remixed by engineer Will Hunt. It was released the same day as One Zero (Acoustic), containing the same ten tracks remixed differently.

== Track listing ==
All songs written by Derek Webb except "Take to the World" which is written by Aaron Tate.

1. "Mockingbird"
2. "Better than Wine"
3. "A King & A Kingdom"
4. "Ballad in Plain Red"
5. "I Hate Everything (but you)"
6. "Wedding Dress"
7. "Medication"
8. "Take to the World"
9. "Rich Young Ruler"
10. "Lover"
