= Overdressed (Caedmon's Call album) =

Studio album by Caedmon's Call
- Released: August 28, 2007
- Studios: House of David, The Little Red Room, Sputnik Sound, Sumner Studio and The Velvet Eagle (Nashville, Tennessee)
- Genres: Rock music, Christian rock
- Length: 44:14
- Label: INO
- Producers: Caedmon's Call; Andrew Osenga

Caedmon's Call chronology
Thankful: The Best of Caedmon's Call (2007)	Overdressed (2007)

Professional ratings
Review scores
Source	Rating
Christianity Today	5/5 stars
Jesus Freak Hideout	4/5 stars

Overdressed is the eighth major studio release from Caedmon's Call, released in August 2007. It features collaboration with former member and successful solo artist Derek Webb. If the album is ordered through Caedmon's Call's website, you can order the Limited Edition, which has two additional tracks.

== Track listing ==
1. "Trouble" – 3:36 (Derek Webb)
2. "Need Your Love" – 3:09 (Andrew Osenga)
3. "Sacred" – 3:25 (Osenga, Randall Goodgame)
4. "Expectations" – 3:21 (Osenga, Goodgame)
5. "There is a Reason" – 3:46 (Osenga, Goodgame)
6. "Share in the Blame" – 3:40 (Webb)
7. "Hold the Light" – 6:00 (Osenga, Goodgame)
8. "Two Weeks in Africa" – 3:44 (Osenga)
9. "Love Grows Love" – 3:59 (Osenga)
10. "All Across the Western World" – 3:01 (Webb, Sandra McCracken)
11. "Always Been There" – 2:37 (Osenga, Goodgame)
12. "Start Again" – 3:56 (Osenga, Goodgame)
13. "Love" (Limited Edition Bonus Track) – 3:44 (Osenga, Goodgame)
14. "Ten Thousand Angels" (Limited Edition Bonus Track) – 4:18 (McCracken)

== Personnel ==
Caedmon's Call

- Cliff Young – vocals, acoustic guitar
- Danielle Young – vocals
- Derek Webb – vocals, acoustic guitar
- Andrew Osenga – vocals, acoustic piano, harmonium, acoustic guitar, electric guitars, bass, trombone
- Josh Moore – acoustic piano, Wurlitzer electric piano, Hammond B3 organ, acoustic guitar
- Jeff Miller – bass
- Todd Bragg – drums
- Garett Buell – percussion

Guest musicians

- Aaron Sands – bass
- Dave Osenga – trumpet

== Production ==
- Bebore Dana Productions – executive producers
- Caedmon's Call – producers
- Andrew Osenga – co-producer
- Matt Mantooth – album design
- Brannon McAllister – album design
- David Dobson – band photography
- Aaron Greene – leaf photography
- Christie Bragg – management

Technical credits

- Bob Boyd – mastering at Ambient Digital (Houston, Texas)
- Shane D. Wilson – mixing at Pentavarit (Nashville, Tennessee)
- Mitch Dane – basic track recording
- Andy Hunt – basic track recording
- Josh Moore – overdub recording
- Jeff Pardo – overdub recording
- Matt Polack – overdub recording
- Andrew Osenga – overdub recording, editing
- Derek Webb – overdub recording
- Vance Powell – initial sounds and setup
- Christopher Williams – African location clips
- Mark Drury – mix assistant
- Sarah Deane – mix coordinator
- Matt Allison – recording assistant
- Nathan Dickinson – recording assistant
