= Indelible Grace =

Indelible Grace is an artist collective based in Nashville, Tennessee, that has led a movement to restore the historic practice of writing new melodies to old hymn texts. The community of songwriters and musicians grew out of the Reformed University Fellowship at Belmont University, led by RUF campus minister Kevin Twit. Their first album was simply titled Indelible Grace, taken from a line in the Augustus Toplady hymn "A Debtor to Mercy Alone". They have also made all of the sheet music available online for free through the Indelible Grace Hymnbook. Key artists involved in the projects include Sandra McCracken, Matthew Smith, Emily Deloach, and Jeremy Casella. Other notable artists that have been featured on recordings include Derek Webb, Andrew Osenga (from The Normals), Matthew Perryman Jones, and Dan Haseltine (from Jars of Clay).

They hosted a hymn sing in 2010 for a sold-out crowd at the Ryman Auditorium in Nashville which was recorded and released as The Hymn Sing: Live in Nashville.

== Discography ==
- Indelible Grace (2000)
- Pilgrim Days: Indelible Grace II (2001)
- For All the Saints: Indelible Grace III (2003)
- Beams of Heaven: Indelible Grace IV (2005)
- Wake Thy Slumbering Children: Indelible Grace V (2007)
- By Thy Mercy: Indelible Grace Acoustic (2009)
- The Hymn Sing: Live in Nashville (2010)
- Joy Beyond the Sorrow: Indelible Grace VI (2012)
- Look to Jesus: Indelible Grace VII (2015)
- Bright Hope For Tomorrow: Indelible Grace Live In Memphis (2024)
- Rove No More: Indelible Grace VIII (2026)
