= Shōmikigen =

Single by Onyanko Club
- Language: Japanese
- A-side: "Shōmikigen"
- B-side: "Dōkyōsei"
- Released: November 20, 2002
- Label: Pony Canyon
- Composer(s): Naoki Masumoto
- Lyricist(s): Yasushi Akimoto

Onyanko Club singles chronology
"Wedding Dress" (1987)	"Shōmikigen" (2002)

"Shōmikigen" (ショーミキゲン) is a reunion single by the Japanese idol girl group Onyanko Club. It was released in Japan on November 20, 2002.

== Track listing ==
All lyrics are written by Yasushi Akimoto; all music is composed by Naoki Masumoto

No.	Title	Length
1.	"Shōmikigen" (ショーミキゲン)
2.	"Dōkyōsei" (同級生)

== Charts ==
=== Weekly charts ===
Chart (2002)	Peak position
Japan (Oricon)	48
