= Best Laid Plans (Sandra McCracken album) =

Studio album by Sandra McCracken
- Released: 2004
- Genre: Singer-Songwriter
- Length: 41:10
- Label: Independent / Shell Records (UK)
- Producer: Peter Collins

Sandra McCracken chronology
Gypsy Flat Road (2001)	Best Laid Plans (2004)	The Builder and the Architect (2005)

Professional ratings
Review scores
Source	Rating
Christianity Today	link

Best Laid Plans is a studio album from Sandra McCracken, recorded in late 2003 with engineer, Ray Kennedy (Twang Trust) and Peter Collins.

In the summer of 2004, Sandra signed the album to Shell Records in London. Shell released the album in the UK, followed by two radio singles, Last Goodbye and No More Tears, which received significant airplay and attention across England, Scotland, Wales and Ireland.

== Track listing ==
1. "Plenty" – 4:18
2. "Last Goodbye" – 3:03
3. "No More Tears" – 3:40
4. "Find You Out (What Matters)" – 3:22
5. "500 Miles" – 3:53
6. "Where Do You Go To My Lovely" – 4:48
7. "Took You For Granted" – 3:21
8. "Sons of Cain" – 3:17
9. "Letters" – 3:37
10. "Stay (Missing Evidence)" – 3:20
11. "Age After Age" – 4:31

== Notes and references ==
1. See SandraMcCracken.com, official website, articles about Best Laid Plans.
2. See MusicOMH Review of Best Laid Plans

== External Resources ==
Best Laid Plans at MusicBrainz (list of releases)
