= The Ringing Bell =

Studio album by Derek Webb
- Released: May 1, 2007
- Studios: The Smoakstack and Sumner Studio, Nashville, TN
- Genres: Rock, CCM
- Length: 30:33
- Label: INO
- Producers: Derek Webb, Cason Cooley

Derek Webb chronology
One Zero (Remix) (2007)	The Ringing Bell (2007)	The Ampersand EP (2008)

The Ringing Bell (2007) is the fourth solo album release from singer-songwriter Derek Webb.

== Background ==
Webb has described the record as a rock record but that "it's fitting that it would be a hard thing to categorize that you couldn't just call it a rock record, that it would be too easy." He also stated that the song "Name" was "probably as close to a thesis as the record has." It carries Webb's theme that "categories in general are not helpful...it's hard to live in a world of categories when really what we need is to know each other and to engage each other and not to let our categories do the talking."

Webb has stated in response to some of his lyrics in "A Love That's Stronger Than Our Fear" and "A Savior on Capitol Hill", which generated talk that Webb was against the George Bush administration, that "I'm not anti-Bush at all...all things considered he deserves the benefit of the doubt and I want to give it to him...This has nothing to do with any specific people."

== Reception ==
Professional ratings
Review scores
Source	Rating
AllMusic	3/5 stars
Beyond The Turntable	8/10 stars
CCM Magazine	4/5 stars
Christian Broadcasting Network	4/5 stars
Christianity Today	4.5/5 stars
Cross Rhythms	9/10 stars
Indie Vision Music	7/10 stars
Jesus Freak Hideout	4/5 stars
Patrol Magazine	9/10 stars
PopMatters	7/10 stars

The Ringing Bell received universally positive reviews from Christian critics. The review site Patrol gave the album a nine on the site's ten-point scale – a record high – praising its "substance." Paste Magazine gave The Ringing Bell a 5 out of 5 and ranked it No. 27 on their Top 100 albums of 2007.

== Track listing ==
No.	Title	Writer(s)	Length
1.	"The End"	Derek Webb	1:34
2.	"The Very End"	Webb	3:02
3.	"A Love That's Stronger Than Our Fear"	Webb	3:03
4.	"I Wanna Marry You All Over Again"	Webb	3:17
5.	"I Don't Want to Fight"	Webb	3:13
6.	"Name"	Webb	3:39
7.	"Can't Be Without You"	Webb	3:34
8.	"I For An I"	Webb	3:22
9.	"A Savior on Capitol Hill"	Webb	2:04
10.	"This Too Shall Be Made Right"	Webb	3:45
Total length:			30:33

== Personnel ==
Band

- Derek Webb – vocals, acoustic and electric guitars, Rhodes piano (1), upright and tack piano (1, 2), hand claps (4), noise (1)
- Cason Cooley – organ (2, 6), percussion (3, 4, 6), upright and tack piano (4, 5, 7), hand claps (4), make out guitar (4), guitar solo (6)
- Matt Pierson – bass guitar
- Will Sayles – drums, percussion

Additional musicians

- Ben Shive – string arrangements (2, 5, 8), Mellotron (2, 8)
- Jason Fitz – violin (2, 5, 8)
- Court Clement – electric guitar (4)
- Gary Burnette – electric guitar (5, 7)
- Steve Mason – lap steel, electric and slide guitar (8), Leslie guitar (9)

Technical

- Derek Webb – producer, additional engineer, vocal engineer at Sumner Studio, East Nashville, Tennessee, art direction
- Cason Cooley – producer, additional engineer at The Smoakstack, Nashville, Tennessee
- Andy Hunt – engineer at The Smoakstack, Nashville, Tennessee
- Shane D. Wilson – mixing at Pentavarit, Nashville, Tennessee
- Jim DeMain – mastering at Yes Master, Nashville, Tennessee
- Brannon Mcallister – art direction
- Jeremy Cowart – photography
- Chris Koelle – illustration
- Brannon McAllister – design, layout

== Charts ==
Chart (2007)	Peak position
US Heatseekers Albums (Billboard)	11
US Top Christian Albums (Billboard)	15
