= Rocketown =

Entertainment facility in Nashville, Tennessee

Coordinates: 36°9′14.94″N 86°46′23.41″W

- Interactive map of Rocketown
- Former names: Rcktwn
- Location: 601 4th Ave. S. Nashville, Tennessee
- Capacity: 550 (seated dinner); 1,500 (standing room only)
- Type: Music venue
- Events: Rock, Punk, Alternative, Hardcore, MetalCore, Emo, Indie Rock, Hip Hop, Rap

Construction
- Opened: 1994
- Expanded: 2010

Website
- www.rocketown.com

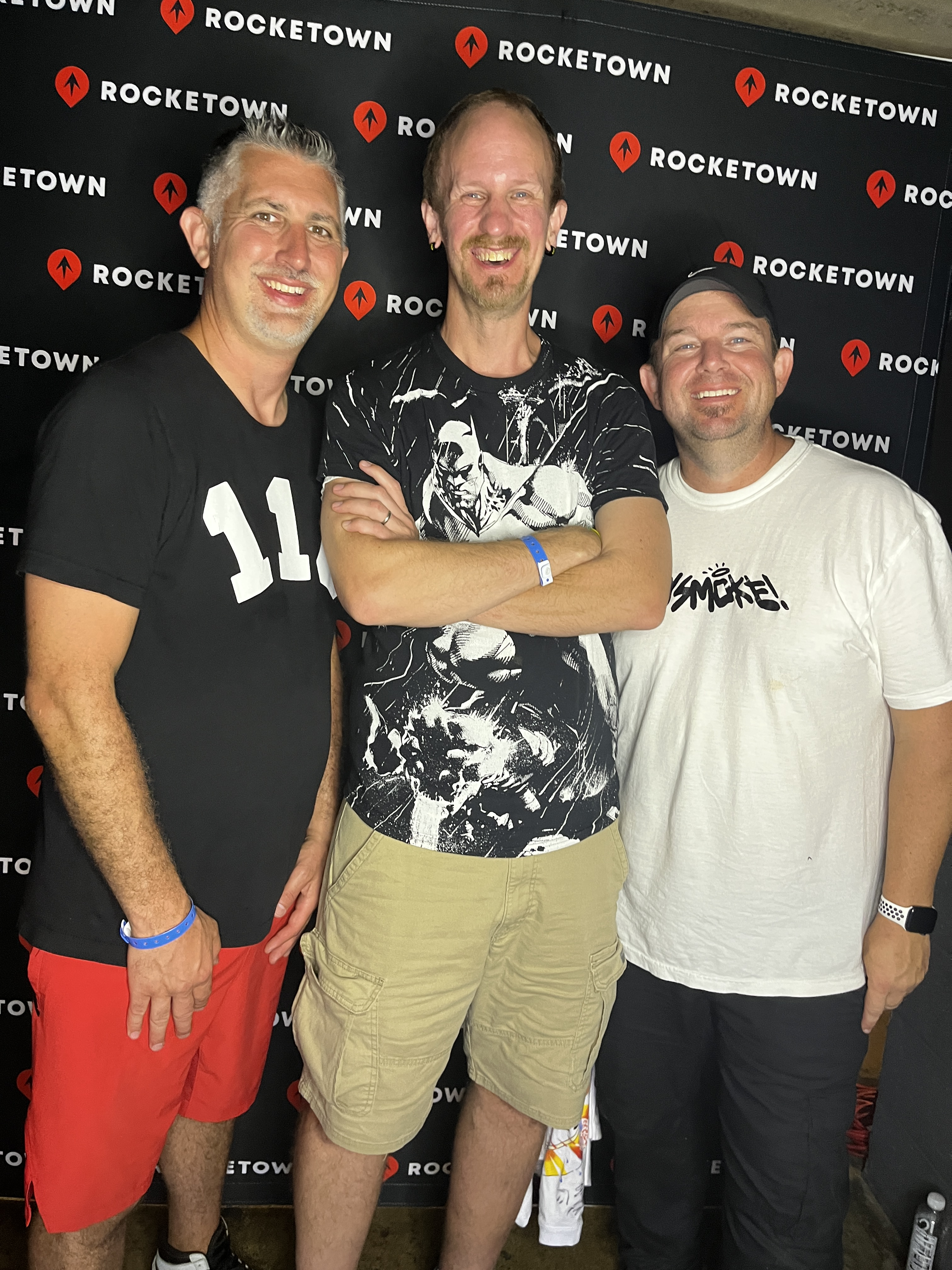
Fans pose for a photo-op while attending Holy Smoke! 2025 at Rocketown.

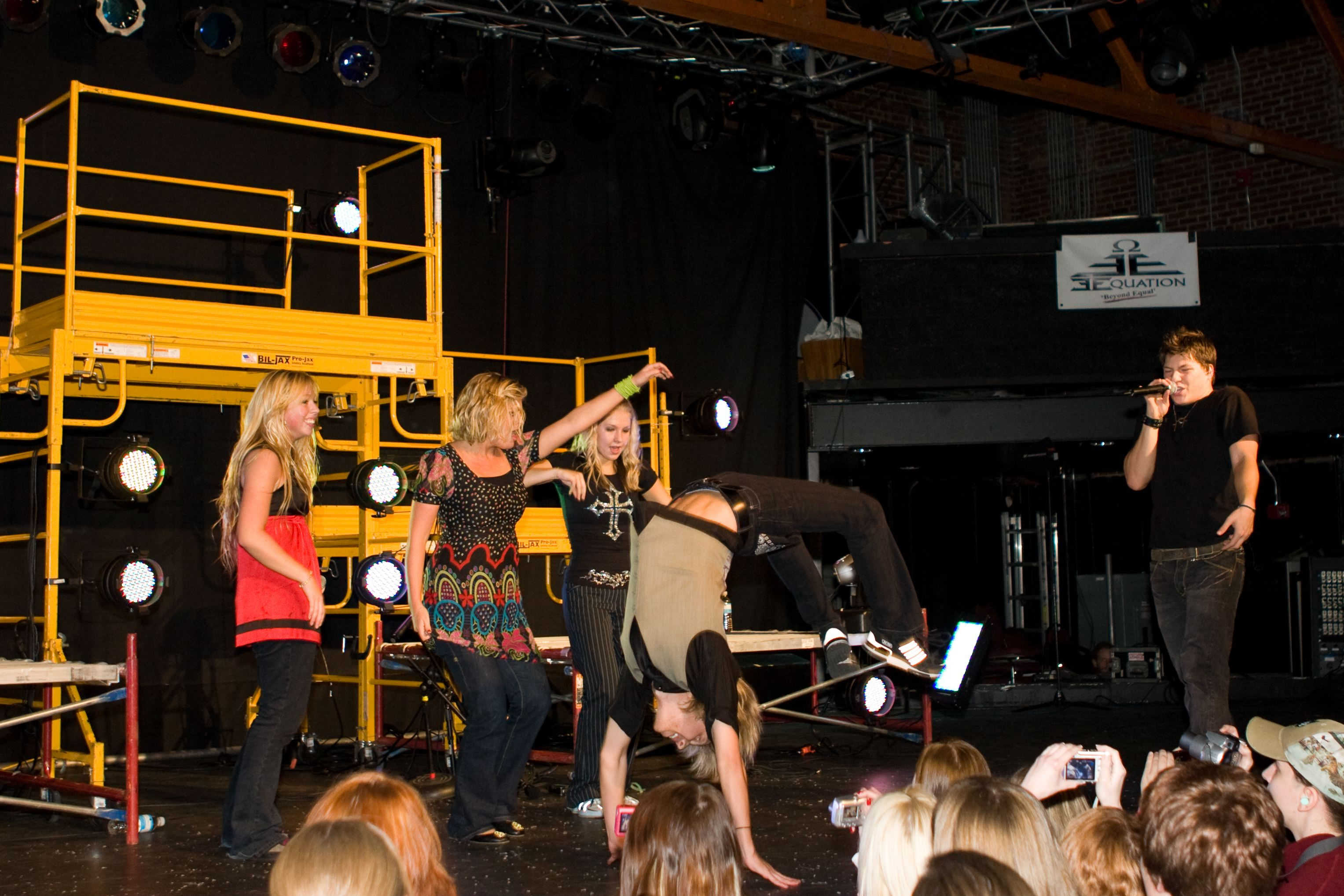
Jump5's farewell concert at Rocketown in 2008

Rocketown is a 40,000-square-foot (3,700 m^{2}) facility with entertainment space, a coffee bar, and indoor skate park, located in Nashville, Tennessee. First opening in Franklin, TN in 1994-95 by contemporary Christian music artist Michael W. Smith, Rocketown was created as a safe, drug and alcohol free place for teenagers to hang out. After closing its building for a brief period, it re-opened in 2003 in downtown Nashville.

Rocketown features after-school classes, skateboarding, video games, and concerts. The concerts are open to patrons of all ages. Its focus is to be a safe all-ages venue that also provides after-school activities such as recording, film editing, art, dance, and much more.

The progressive metal group, Between the Buried and Me, filmed their live CD and DVD, Colors, at Rocketown, on August 2, 2008. The Christian metal band Demon Hunter also filmed a live show at Rocketown for their live DVD and CD.

Rocketown moved a few blocks to a new location in mid-2010. The city began construction for the new Music City Center and expanded Korean Veterans Boulevard, so the venue relocated. The last show at the old location (401 6th Ave S), Travisfest, was held on Saturday April 24. The first show in the new building, Clash of the Genres, was on April 30. The now current main building was open on August 6, 2010 as a part of the Back to School Bash and Grand Opening weekend.
