= I See Things Upside Down =

Studio album by Derek Webb
- Released: November 9, 2004
- Studios: The Smoakstack, Nashville, Tennessee
- Genres: Experimental rock, folk, contemporary Christian
- Length: 63:42
- Label: INO
- Producers: Derek Webb, Cason Cooley, Matt Pierson, Will Sayles, Justin Loucks, Paul Moak, Kenny Meeks

Derek Webb chronology
| The House Show (2004) | I See Things Upside Down (2004) | Mockingbird (2005) |

I See Things Upside Down (2004) is the second solo studio album from singer-songwriter Derek Webb. It was recorded at The Smoakstack recording studio in Nashville, Tennessee and engineered by Justin Loucks. This album branches out musically from what Webb had done in the past, and Webb has stated that he wanted to "dismantle everyone's idea of what kind of music they could expect" from him.

Referencing the paradoxes provided in Christ's teachings, I See Things Upside Down investigates the idea that perhaps, contrary to our religious and social standards, failure equals success, poverty equals riches, weakness equals strength, and foolishness equals understanding. “What are the things that we American Christians value in our culture and how is that different and often ‘upside down’ from true Kingdom values? I’ve found that often success looks more like failure, riches more like poverty, and that real life often feels more like death,” said Webb.

== Reception ==
Professional ratings
Review scores
| Source | Rating |
|---|---|
| AllMusic | 3.5/5 stars |
| CCM Magazine | A− |
| Christianity Today | 5/5 stars |
| Cross Rhythms | 8/10 stars |
| Jesus Freak Hideout | 4/5 stars |
| Challies | 5/5 stars |
| RELEVANT | 4/5 stars |

Webb's second album was well-received by both fans and critics alike. Sonically folksy-rock, I See Things Upside Down wasted no time mincing words or sugarcoating Webb's perception of the state of the Church and the American faith culture. This criticism shouldn't be taken as disdain, per se, as Webb continues to assert he is particularly passionate about the Church. In an interview with Cross Rhythms, Webb said, "It's the same dilemma patriots have always had. Patriots love their government enough to be able to criticise it. I love the Church; the Church needs to hear the Gospel. I feel very encouraged at the camaraderie I have felt with college kids, families, even pastors, as we all share our concerns. If I can continue doing this, I am very happy."

== Track listing ==
| No. | Title | Writer(s) | Length |
|---|---|---|---|
| 1. | "I Want a Broken Heart" | Derek Webb | 6:33 |
| 2. | "Better Than Wine" | Webb | 3:16 |
| 3. | "The Strong, the Tempted, & The Weak" | John Kent (words), Webb (music) | 5:53 |
| 4. | "Reputation" | Webb | 4:24 |
| 5. | "I Repent" | Webb | 4:29 |
| 6. | "Medication" | Webb | 4:58 |
| 7. | "We Come to You" | Aaron Tate | 8:07 |
| 8. | "T-Shirts (What We Should Be Known For)" | Webb | 4:33 |
| 9. | "Ballad in Plain Red" | Webb | 4:42 |
| 10. | "Nothing is Ever Enough" | Webb | 5:46 |
| 11. | "Lover Part 2" | Webb | 5:48 |
| 12. | "What is Not Love" | Webb | 5:05 |
| Total length: | | | 63:42 |

== Personnel ==
Band

- Derek Webb - vocals, acoustic guitar, electric guitar, ebow, vibes, percussion, toy piano
- Cason Cooley - piano, synthesizer, atmospherics, electric guitar, organ, mellotron
- Matt Pierson - bass guitar, upright bass
- Will Sayles - drums, percussion, piano, filters
- Paul Moak - electric guitars, toy piano, Hammond B-3 organ, slide guitar
- Kenny Meeks - electric guitar
- David Henry - cello
- Sandra McCracken - vocals (on We Come To You)
- Rev. I.B. Longe - electric guitar (on Ballad In Plain Red)

Technical

- Production – Derek Webb, Cason Cooley, Matt Pierson, Will Sayles, Justin Loucks, Paul Moak, & Kenny Meeks
- Recorded and Mixed by – Justin Loucks, The Smoakstack, Nashville, TN
- Additional Recording by - Derek Webb & Cason Cooley @ Webb Casa (Assisted by Jimmy Jernigan & Stephen Gause), Nashville, TN; and Paul Moak @ The Smoakstack, Nashville, TN
- Mastered by – Jim DeMain @ Yes Master, Nashville, TN
- Creative Director – Dana Salsedo
- Art Direction – Derek Webb and Wayne Brezinka
- Design & Layout – Wayne Brezinka
- Photography - Glen Rose
- Additional Photography - Sandra McCracken

== Awards and accolades ==
I See Things Upside Down was selected as the #2 best album of 2004 by Christianity Today magazine.

== Charts ==
| Chart (2004) | Peak position |
|---|---|
| US Top Christian Albums (Billboard) | 34 |
