= Long Line of Leavers =

Studio album by Caedmon's Call
- Released: October 10, 2000
- Studios: The Bennett House and Sound Kitchen (Franklin, Tennessee); The Spank Factory and Recording Arts (Nashville, Tennessee); The Farm (Marvin, North Carolina); Frontpage Recorders (Glendale, California)
- Genres: Rock music, Christian rock
- Length: 54:59
- Label: Essential
- Producers: Monroe Jones; Ed Cash; Caedmon's Call

Caedmon's Call chronology
40 Acres (1999)	Long Line of Leavers (2000)	Songs from the Guild (2000)

Professional ratings
Review scores
Source	Rating
AllMusic	4/5 stars

Long Line of Leavers is a studio album from Caedmon's Call. It was recorded at the following studios:

- The Bennett House - Franklin, Tennessee (engineer Ben Wisch)
- The Farm - Marvin, North Carolina (engineer Ed Cash)
- Sound Kitchen - Franklin, Tennessee (Engineer Jim Dineen) (produced by Monroe Jones)

== Track listing ==
1. "Only One" – 3:47 (Aaron Tate)
2. "Love Is Different" – 4:33 (Derek Webb)
3. "Prepare Ye the Way" – 4:30 (John Michael Talbot)
4. "Prove Me Wrong" – 2:50 (Tate)
5. "Mistake of My Life" – 3:53 (Webb)
6. "Masquerade" – 4:52 (Ed Cash)
7. "What You Want" – 4:03 (Webb)
8. "Valleys Fill First" – 4:12 (Tate, Cash)
9. "Can't Lose You" – 4:59 (Webb)
10. "Love Alone" – 4:55 (Tate)
11. "Dance" – 5:29 (Webb)
12. "Piece of Glass" – 4:09 (Webb, Danielle Young)
13. "Ballad of San Francisco" – 2:50 (Webb)

== Personnel ==
Caedmon's Call

- Cliff Young – vocals, guitars
- Derek Webb – vocals, guitars, banjo
- Danielle Young – vocals
- Joshua Moore – acoustic piano, Rhodes electric piano, Wurlitzer electric piano, Hammond B3 organ, accordion, harmonica
- Jeff Miller – bass
- Todd Bragg – drums, percussion
- Garett Buell – drums, percussion

Guest musicians

- Monroe Jones – keyboards (7, 10)
- Jeff Roach – keyboards (7, 9, 10)
- George Cocchini – electric guitar (1, 7, 9, 12)
- Ed Cash – electric guitar (2), mandolin (2), guitars (3–5, 8, 11), Rhodes electric piano (4), backing vocals (4, 5, 11, 13), acoustic guitar (6, 13), Ebow (12), whistling (13)
- Aaron Senseman – electric guitar (5)
- Gary Burnette – electric guitar (7)
- Byron House – upright bass (6, 12, 13)
- Mark Hill – bass (7)
- Barry Green – trombone (1)
- Mike Haynes – trumpet (1)
- David Angell – strings (3, 6)
- John Catchings – strings (3, 6)
- David Davidson – strings (3, 6)
- Conni Ellisor – strings (3, 6)
- Carl Gorodetsky – strings (3, 6)
- Richard Grosjean – strings (3, 6)
- Anthony LaMarchina – strings (3, 6)
- Pamela Sixfin – strings (3, 6)
- Mary Kathryn Vanosdale – strings (3, 6)
- Kristin Wilkinson – strings (3, 6), string arrangements (3, 6)

Production

- Robert Beeson – executive producer
- Bob Wohler – executive producer
- Monroe Jones – producer (1, 7, 9, 10)
- Caedmon's Call – producers (2–6, 8, 11–13)
- Ed Cash – producer (2–6, 8, 11–13), engineer (5), mixing (5)
- Caedmon's Call – producers (2–6, 8, 11–13)
- Jim Dineen – recording (1, 7, 9, 10)
- Shane D. Wilson – mixing (1, 7, 9)
- Ben Wisch – recording (2–4, 6, 8, 11–13), mixing (2–4, 6, 8, 11–13)
- Chris Fogel – mixing (10)
- Melissa Mattey – recording assistant (1, 7, 9, 10)
- J.C. Monterrosa – mix assistant (1, 7, 9)
- Shawn McLean – assistant engineer (2–4, 6, 8, 11–13)
- Scott Cash – assistant engineer (5)
- Bob Boyd – additional recording (5), mastering at Ambient Digital (Houston, Texas)
- Aaron Senseman – guitar technician
- Michelle Pearson – A&R coordinator
- Jordyn Thomas – artist development, art direction
- Cliff Young – art direction
- Michelle Kapp – art direction, design
- Kristin Barlowe – artist photography, stylist
- Sheila Davis – hair, make-up
- Christie Bragg – management

== Release details ==
- 2000, US, Essential Records 10559, Release Date October 10, 2000, CD
