= She Must and Shall Go Free =

Studio album by Derek Webb
- Released: March 25, 2003
- Recorded: Nashville, Tennessee
- Genres: Folk, Americana, contemporary Christian music
- Length: 50:52
- Label: INO
- Producers: Garett Buell, Kenny Meeks, Matt Pierson, Derek Webb

Derek Webb chronology
| She Must and Shall Go Free (2003) | The House Show (2004) |

She Must and Shall Go Free is the first solo studio album by the singer-songwriter Derek Webb following his 2003 departure from Caedmon's Call. Named for the last line of a 175-year-old hymn written by William Gadsby, according to Webb, the album "is an emphatic statement about the liberation and ultimate security of the people of God -- the church." A result of Webb's questioning his role in the "church" and its role in culture, it is a poignant and challenging look at what it means to pursue faith in today's church-laden culture.

== Background ==
After touring with Caedmon's Call for ten years, Webb's first solo record was an effort to ask and answer questions about the church, one's role in it and its role in culture. He further elaborated, "After ten years in a Christian band, backstage in the music industry and in the hallways of church buildings across America, my attention as a songwriter has turned to a fresh affection for the Church. It seems we know all too little of who She is, how She should dress, or what She was made for. I have found that Scripture is provocative when it comes to these issues and so these songs are not for the faint of heart. Truth is, God would rather die than be without Her, and She is both wretched and radiant. I’m convinced that there is only one righteousness suitable for Jesus’s bride, and He is jealous for Her love. For the believer, truth is freedom. Even truth that is hard to hear. May these songs stir all of us to see, as if for the first time, that we have (still) a great need for a Savior, and a great Savior for our need."

== Reception ==
Professional ratings
Review scores
| Source | Rating |
|---|---|
| AllMusic | 4.5/5 stars |
| Christianity Today | 5/5 stars |
| Cross Rhythms | 10/10 stars |
| Jesus Freak Hideout | 4/5 stars |
| New Release Tuesday | 5/5 stars |
| The Phantom Tollbooth | 5/5 stars |

She Must and Shall Go Free received acclaim six critics who reviewed it. The album received four five-star and/or ten-star perfect ratings from Christianity Today, Cross Rhythms, New Release Tuesday and The Phantom Tollbooth. Russ Breimeier of Christianity Today cautioned that "It should be mentioned that She Must and Shall Go Free is worded so passionately, some might initially react negatively to it", but noted, "Perhaps most admirable is Derek's tone, which despite his strong criticisms of religion, is very humble. Derek tempers his points nicely with perspective, often pointing the finger at himself and allowing the listeners to convict themselves if the shoe fits – just don't be surprised to find that one size fits all. There's an urgent need for the Christian church to hear the bold and convicting songs of Derek Webb. With a message you need to hear and an album you'll want to hear, She Must and Shall Go Free is already a surefire contender for one of the best albums of 2003." Mike Rimmer of Cross Rhythms wrote, "It's a shame that one of the most important albums of 2003 will probably go largely unnoticed in the general Christian music scene. Why so? Because rather than penning a pile of soft songs about love and grace, Derek Webb has chosen to write songs of such powerful prophetic intention that it's impossible not to be challenged. The former Caedmon's Call member tackles head on the state of the Church, its corruption and God’s unchanging sacrificial love. Lyrically a lot of these songs are speaking to the listener from God's perspective and it's not always a comfortable listen and yet it's essential that we are creating music that speaks honestly and creatively about realities." Kevin Davis of New Release Tuesday describked how the album's contents "are all can't miss songs and this is one of my favorite albums ever". Brian A. Smith of The Phantom Tollbooth wrote, "With many quality guests (Jars of Clay, Sandra McCracken) and outstanding songwriting, She Shall and Must Go Free is my early nominee for album of the year. Webb achieves a rarity in music by producing a superior solo effort to that of his former group's recordings."

The album had a half-star deduction from five by Steve Losey of AllMusic, who wrote, "What Webb has accomplished with the opus is a grand statement about love, the church, and life through the eyes of a man that humbly serves Christ". Losey added, "The tune is sung from Christ's perspective, relaying the need for believers to uplift the church body. The tune is a fitting end to the opus as a piano melody is bolstered by swelling harmonies between Webb and his wife, Sandra McCracken. She Must and Shall Go Free is easily one of the best-written releases of the year. Its richness and worshipful tone could win Webb Artist of the Year honors." Ron of Jesus Freak Hideout gave it four- stars out of five, and he alluded to how he's "...seen this album bring people to tears because of its sheer beauty and brutal honesty rolled into one. Thank you, Derek for pushing Christian Music into this realm." He cautioned, "Don't be turned off by the album's country finger-picking style in the beginning seconds of the album. While at first the musical tone of the album might seem hokey or mellow, the lyrics are far from that. Webb takes a bold step lyrically in calling the church out of its comfort zone".

It is notable for causing controversy in contemporary Christian music circles. Some Christian retailers refused to stock the album for its use of "strong" language. One of the songs that was the basis for controversy was "Wedding Dress", where Webb describes himself as a "whore" who puts Christ "on like a wedding dress", in an effort to portray how often it is difficult to remain faithful to the indelible but trustworthy God when there are so many tangible and fleeting pleasures available in the present. "Saint and Sinner" was also a point of contention due to the original line, "I used to be a damned mess but now I look just fine, 'Cause you dressed me up and we drank the finest wine". The word "damned" was removed from the final version of the album, at the request of two major Christian retailers.

== Track listing ==
| No. | Title | Writer(s) | Guest musician(s) | Length |
|---|---|---|---|---|
| 1. | "Nobody Loves Me" | Derek Webb | Stephen Mason, Blair Masters | 4:22 |
| 2. | "She Must and Shall Go Free" | Sandra McCracken & Webb | Sandra McCracken, Phil Madeira | 3:46 |
| 3. | "Take to the World" | Aaron Tate | Dan Haseltine, Matt Odmark, Charlie Lowell, Stephen Mason | 4:04 |
| 4. | "Nothing (Without You)" | Webb | The Rev. I. B. Longe | 2:51 |
| 5. | "Lover" | Webb | Sandra McCracken | 4:35 |
| 6. | "Wedding Dress" | Webb | Phil Madeira | 5:22 |
| 7. | "Awake My Soul" | McCracken | Charlie Lowell, Sandra McCracken | 4:18 |
| 8. | "Saint and Sinner" | Webb | Charlie Lowell, Rufus (aka Buddy Greene) | 4:37 |
| 9. | "Beloved" | Webb | Sandra McCracken | 6:42 |
| 10. | "Crooked Deep Down" | Webb | Sandra McCracken, Kenny Meeks ("Gospel of Jesus"-composer, guitar, vocals) | 3:30 |
| 11. | "The Church" | Webb | Matt Stanfield, Sara Groves, John Catchings, Kenny Meeks-vocals on "Bless the Lord" (Andrae Crouch) | 6:45 |
| Total length: | | | | 50:52 |

== Personnel ==
=== Band ===
- Derek Webb – vocals, acoustic and electric guitars, banjo (tracks 1, 8, 9)
- Kenny Meeks – acoustic and electric guitars, vocals, mandolin on tracks 1, 7, National guitar on tracks 9, 11
- Matt Pierson – bass guitar, organ (track 5)
- Garett Buell – drums, percussion

=== Guest musicians ===
- Sara Groves – vocals (track 11)
- Dan Haseltine – vocals (track 3)
- Matt Odmark – 12-string acoustic guitar (track 3)
- Charlie Lowell – B-3 organ (tracks 3 & 8), accordion (track 7)
- Stephen Mason – electric guitars (tracks 1 & 3), lap steel
- John Catchings - cello (track 11)
- Sandra McCracken - vocals (tracks 2, 5, 7, 9, 10)

=== Technical ===
- Derek Webb – producer
- Kenny Meeks – producer
- Matt Pierson – additional production
- Garett Buell – additional production

== Charts ==
| Chart (2003) | Peak position |
|---|---|
| US Top Christian Albums (Billboard) | 22 |
| US Heatseekers Albums (Billboard) | 15 |
