= 40 Acres (album) =

Studio album by Caedmon's Call
- Released: April 13, 1999
- Studio: The Castle (Franklin, Tennessee)
- Genres: Rock music, Christian rock
- Length: 44:41
- Label: Essential
- Producer: Glenn Rosenstein

Caedmon's Call chronology
The Guild Collection Vol. 2 (1998)	40 Acres (1999)	Long Line of Leavers (2000)

40 Acres is the 1999 release from Caedmon's Call and made the band known to a wider, and even international, audience. The album explores the way God's redemption intersects with the places and ways people live their daily lives. The album was recorded at The Castle, Franklin, Tennessee with engineers Steve Bishir, Glenn Rosenstein, and Mike Purcell and mixed at East Iris Recording Studios - now known as House of Blues Nashville, Nashville, Tennessee with engineers David Leonard, Charlie Brocco, Mike Purcell, and Ed Szymczak. "There You Go" is on the Digital Praise PC game Guitar Praise.

== Critical reception ==
Professional ratings
Review scores
Source	Rating
AllMusic	4/5 stars

== Track listing ==
No.	Title	Writer(s)	Length
1.	"There You Go"	Aaron Tate	3:20
2.	"Thankful"	Derek Webb	4:20
3.	"Shifting Sand"	Tate	3:49
4.	"Faith My Eyes"	Webb	4:41
5.	"Where I Began"	Tate	3:42
6.	"Table for Two"	Webb	3:34
7.	"Climb On (A Back That's Strong)" (Shawn Colvin cover)	Shawn Colvin, John Leventhal	3:51
8.	"Petrified Heart"	Tate	4:41
9.	"Somewhere North"	Webb	5:31
10.	"Daring Daylight Escape"	Webb	3:39
11.	"40 Acres"	Tate	3:33

== Personnel ==
Caedmon's Call

- Cliff Young – lead vocals (1, 5, 8, 11), acoustic guitar (1, 3, 5, 7, 8, 10, 11), backing vocals (7)
- Derek Webb – acoustic guitar (1–7, 9–11), electric 12-string guitar (1), backing vocals (1, 5, 11), lead vocals (2, 4, 6, 9, 10), banjo (4, 7), electric guitar (5, 8–10)
- Danielle Young – backing vocals (1, 2, 4, 5, 8–11), lead vocals (3, 7)
- Randy Holsapple – Hammond B3 organ (1, 2, 4, 5, 7, 9, 11), harmonica (2, 10), accordion (4, 11), Wurlitzer electric piano (6), acoustic piano (8), Mellotron (8), Fender Rhodes (9)
- Aric Nitzberg – electric bass (1, 2, 5, 7–11), upright bass (3, 6, 8), acoustic bass (4)
- Todd Bragg – drums (1, 2, 4–11), trash can (2)
- Garett Buell – percussion (1, 2, 4–8, 10, 11), trash can (2), djembe (3, 11), udu (3, 8, 11), marimba (5), tambourine (8), tabla (8), dumbek (8)

Guest musicians

- Matt Rollings – acoustic piano (3, 4, 9, 10), Hammond B3 organ (3, 10)
- Keith Rodger – electric guitar (1)
- Glenn Rosenstein – electric 12-string guitar (1, 2, 7), dulcimer (8), acoustic guitar (11)
- Phil Madeira – lap steel guitar (5, 11), accordion (6, 7)
- John Catchings – cello (4)
- Blair Master – string arrangements
- Nashville Recording Symphony – strings

Production

- Robert Beeson – executive producer
- Bob Wohler – A&R
- Glenn Rosenstein – producer, engineer
- Steve Bishir – engineer
- Mike Purcell – engineer
- Steve Short – additional assistant engineer
- David Leonard – mixing at East Iris Studios (Nashville, Tennessee)
- Charlie Brocco – assistant mix engineer
- Edward Szymczak – assistant mix engineer
- Ken Love – mastering at MasterMix (Nashville, Tennessee)
- John Trevethan – technical assistance
- Traci Sterling Bishir – production coordinator
- Michelle Pearson – project coordinator
- Double Down Images – photography
- Derek Hime – live photography
- Beth Holsey – live photography
- PhotoDisc, Inc. – cover image
- Origin Design (Houston, Texas) – visuals
- Reel Management – management

== Release details ==
- 1999, US, Essential Records 83061-0486-2, release date April 13, 1999, CD
