= Caedmon's Call =

American contemporary Christian band

- Origin: Houston, Texas, U.S.
- Genres: Folk, alternative rock, contemporary Christian music
- Years active: 1993–2010; 2022
- Labels: Warner Alliance, Essential, INO
- Members: Cliff Young; Danielle (Glenn) Young; Todd Bragg; Derek Webb; Garett Buell; Randy Holsapple; Aric Nitzberg
- Past members: Cari Harris Moore; Doug Elmore; Aaron Tate; Joshua Moore; Jeff Miller; Andrew Osenga
- Website: www.caedmonscall.com

Caedmon's Call was a contemporary Christian band that fused traditional folk with world music and alternative rock. They were composed of Cliff Young (lead vocals and rhythm guitar), Derek Webb (lead vocals, guitar), Danielle Young (vocals), Garett Buell (percussion), Jeff Miller (bass guitar), Todd Bragg (drums), and Josh Moore (keyboard, accordion, harmonica).

After membership turnover and a hiatus, the original line-up reformed in 2022 and, with the help of a Kickstarter campaign, re-recorded their major label debut eponymous album and performed a reunion concert at the Ryman Auditorium.

== History ==
Caedmon's Call was formed in 1993 with six original members, Cliff Young (whose father and brother are highly successful pastors of megachurches), Danielle Glenn, Todd Bragg, Cari Harris, Doug Elmore, and Aaron Tate. Tate, however, never intended to tour with the band, and was included in a songwriting capacity only. Derek Webb also joined the band early on, though he did not even meet all the band members until after they had played their first show together. In June 1994, the band released their first album, My Calm // Your Storm, originally a cassette-only demo recording. Webb connected high-school friend and drummer Garett Buell with the band. My Calm // Your Storm was re-issued twice the same year with different cover art each time. In 1996 the band signed with now-defunct Christian label Warner Alliance, producing their self-titled major label debut. Around this time, Randy Holsapple joined the group.

After the collapse of Warner Alliance in 1998, the band signed to Essential Records, where they remained until May 2006. In 2000 through 2003 they were part of the four City on a Hill releases: Songs of Praise and Worship and The Gathering, It's Christmastime and Sing Alleluia.

In mid-1999, both Aric Nitzberg and Randy Holsapple left the band, while Joshua Moore and Jeff Miller (high-school friend of Buell and Webb) became official members. In 2003, after the release of Back Home, Webb left the band to pursue a solo career. In early 2004, Andrew Osenga, former lead singer of the Normals joined.

Tate and Webb shared most of the songwriting duties until the album Back Home, which featured songs by a more diverse set of writers. Randall Goodgame has, in the proceeding years, become one of the band's primary songwriters.

Share the Well was released in 2004 as a missions album. Well-received by critics but unable to find a radio audience, the album, which includes songs written by Goodgame, Osenga and Moore, was inspired by the band's trip to India, Brazil and Ecuador. In addition to broader Christian themes, it tackles a variety of issues, such as hunger and the Dalit's battle for freedom in India.

=== Meaning behind the name ===
The band's unusual name was inspired by Cædmon, an Anglo-Saxon cow-herder and monk who lived during the 7th century. Legend has it that Caedmon was afraid to sing in public due to a lack of musical talent, and shied away from occasions where he had to sing. After leaving a feast one night because he was too embarrassed to sing, he lay down in the pasture with the cattle to sleep. An angel appeared to him in a dream, calling him to sing. After initially refusing, he eventually decided to sing and when he did, he sang beautiful verses that had never been heard before. His songs were in the local vernacular language at a time when all other Christian songs were in Latin. Founding band members Cliff, Danielle, and Aaron decided on the name "Caedmon's Call" after all three heard this story during the same week and thought it was fitting.

== Musical development ==
Over the years, Caedmon's Call enveloped and adapted many different musical stylings, the most obvious being their folk and alternative rock roots. On their first mainstream, self-titled release (Caedmon's Call), the band utilized stylings that ranged from straight-up folk-rock ("Lead of Love", "Coming Home"), rock ("Not the Land"), folk ("This World", "Bus Driver"), and simple acoustic guitar ballads ("Center Aisle").

Their second album, 40 Acres, made after the dissolution of Warner Alliance, has a more settled folk-rock sound. Songs such as the Derek Webb-penned "Thankful", for instance, took advantage of those folk-rock stylings, relying heavily on percussion.

Long Line of Leavers, their third wide-release album, became something of a milestone for the band, including a wider range of instrumentation and stylings. "The Only One" featured a brass accompaniment, something Caedmon's Call had never experimented with before, whereas "The Ballad of San Francisco" was debatably the most folkish song ever included on a Caedmon's Call album. "Prove Me Wrong" was a simple guitar-driven pop song, while "What You Want" stands in the tradition of "Not the Land" as upbeat rock-and-roll.

The albums In the Company of Angels: A Call to Worship and Back Home came during an interim phase in which Aaron Tate and Derek Webb were mostly inactive as song writers for the band, Aaron only contributing lyrics for the song "Beautiful Mystery" on Back Home and Derek's former wife Sandra McCracken contributing music and lyrics for "Awake My Soul" to that record as well. A diverse array of songwriters provided material for the band. These albums, while still largely driven by the acoustic guitar, were characterized by simpler lyrics and melodies than the band's past material, and more of an adult contemporary feel that did not sit well with most older fans. Many felt the source of the band's relevance to be the hard-hitting, deeply introspective lyrics penned by Tate and Webb, which often included common and obscure Biblical, historical, and popular references cast in new contexts. Caedmon's was often billed or described as "a thinking Christian's band." Lacking these kinds of lyrics, and with the band adopting a blander CCM sound, many fans began looking elsewhere.

In 2004, Share the Well proved to be a notable artistic leap for the band. Caedmon's Call decided to incorporate world music influences into the album during mission trips with Compassion International to India, Ecuador, and Brazil. The Indian influence was most prominent on this album, with several Dalit musicians providing instruments and vocals. In addition to Randall Goodgame, Josh Moore and Andrew Osenga emerged as the new primary songwriters for the band.

In 2006, Caedmon's released In the Company of Angels II: The World Will Sing. This sequel to the first In the Company of Angels was recorded despite the band's lack of desire to make the album under pressure from their record label. It was the last album that the band made for Essential Records, before parting ways with the label in May 2006. The band is now associated with INO Records, and named their fall 2006 tour "The Emancipation Tour"--possibly in part a reference to their split from their former label.

For most of the band's tenure, lead vocals were split somewhat evenly between Cliff Young and Derek Webb. Cliff would usually sing lead on the Aaron Tate songs (he didn't typically write his own songs for the group, though he played a large part in the arrangements), and Derek would sing lead on the songs that he wrote, which were often more personal in nature. Danielle typically sang lead on two to four songs per album; until 2010's Raising Up the Dead, "Piece of Glass" (co-written with Webb) was the only song that she had written for the band. Once Derek Webb ceased writing songs for the band in the years leading up to his departure, Cliff emerged as the primary vocalist for the band, a role that he retained, though Danielle had been able to sing lead more frequently as a result of this. The band's newest vocalist, Andrew Osenga, sang lead four times on the first two albums he participated in; on the song "Bombay Rain" and the hidden track "I Miss You", both of which he wrote for Share the Well, and on "The Story" and "We Give Thanks", from In the Company of Angels II.

On May 22, 2007, it was announced in a press release that Caedmon's Call's first INO release, Overdressed, would be released in late August 2007. This same press release announced Derek Webb had returned to work on the album after a four-year absence. His replacement, Andrew Osenga, remained in the band as well. On the album Overdressed, Osenga was featured as the lead vocalist on four tracks.

In January 2008 the band's song Ten Thousand Angels was featured in an episode of Grey's Anatomy (Season 4, Episode 11: Lay Your Hands On Me) while several different scenes played.

In August 2009, Andy Osenga announced that he would not be part of the next album, Raising Up the Dead. The album was released for pre-sale on August 2, 2010 in a tiered pricing structure. Raising Up the Dead was an attempt to keep most of the songwriting in-house; Derek Webb returned to contribute on the album, as well as Derek's former wife, Sandra McCracken being the only songwriter from outside the band to contribute. Unusually, Danielle co-wrote and sang lead on six of the album's twelve songs, with the remainder of the lead vocals being evenly split between Cliff and Derek.

Caedmon's Call joined Brite Revolution and, for a time, released a new (or old, or rare) track. Members of Brite can help support one of Caedmon's most passionate missions, the Dalit Freedom Network. After a smaller tour for Raising Up the Dead, the band has been largely inactive.

== 2022 Reunion ==
After a 12-year hiatus, the band announced via a Kickstarter campaign that they were reuniting to re-record their 1997 self-titled album, which had since fallen out of print, in commemoration of its 25-year anniversary. The album's release date was November 3, 2022. Additionally, the band also played special performances at the Ryman Auditorium in Nashville to commemorate the anniversary.

== Band members ==
- Cliff Young – lead vocals and rhythm guitar (1993–2010, 2022)
- Danielle Young (née Glenn) – vocals, guitar (1993–2010, 2022)
- Aaron Tate – songwriting (1993–2001)
- Cari Harris Moore – vocals (1993–1994)
- Todd Bragg – drums (1993–2010, 2022)
- Derek Webb – acoustic guitar, electric guitar, banjo, keys, vocals, backing vocals (1993–2003, 2007–2010, 2022)
- Garett Buell – percussion (1994–2011, 2022)
- Aric Nitzberg – bass guitar (1994–1999, 2022)
- Randy Holsapple – keyboards (1997–1999, 2010, 2022)
- Jeff Miller – bass guitar (1999–2010)
- Joshua Moore – keyboards, accordion, harmonica (1999–2010)
- Andrew Osenga – guitar, vocals (2003–2007)
- Emmanuel Singh- Percussion

== Discography ==
=== Studio albums ===
- My Calm // Your Storm (1994)
- Caedmon's Call (1997)
- 40 Acres (1999)
- Long Line of Leavers (2000)
- In the Company of Angels: A Call to Worship (2001)
- Back Home (2003)
- Share the Well (2004)
- In the Company of Angels II: The World Will Sing (2006)
- Overdressed (2007)
- Raising Up the Dead (2010)
- Caedmon's Call (25th anniversary edition) (2022)

=== EPs ===
- Caedmon's Call (1993)
- Just Don't Want Coffee (1995)
- Limited Edition Tour EP (1997)
- Intimate Portrait (1997)
- 40 Acres: The Austin Sessions (1999)

=== Compilations ===
- The Guild Collection Vol. 1 (1994)
- The Guild Collection Vol. 2 (1998)
- The Guild Collection Vol. 3 (1999)
- Songs from the Guild (2000)
- Chronicles 1992–2004 (2004)
- Thankful: The Best of Caedmon's Call (2007)
