= Derek Webb =

American musician (born 1974)

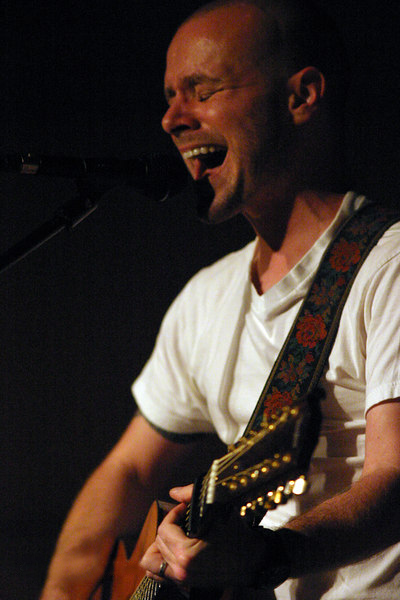
- Derek Webb in 2006

Background information
- Born: May 27, 1974 (age 52)
- Origin: Memphis, Tennessee, U.S.
- Genres: Singer-songwriter, folk, contemporary Christian music
- Occupations: Singer, songwriter, record producer, co-founder and president of Noisetrade
- Years active: 1993–present
- Labels: Warner Alliance, Essential, INO
- Formerly of: Caedmon's Call
- Spouse(s): Sandra McCracken (m. 2001; div. 2014) Abbie Parker
- Website: derekwebb.com

Derek Walsh Webb (born May 27, 1974) is an American singer-songwriter of independent and Christian music who first entered the music industry as a member of the band Caedmon's Call, and later embarked on a successful solo career. As a member of the Houston, Texas–based Caedmon's Call, Webb has seen career sales approaching 1 million records, along with 10 GMA Dove Award nominations and three Dove Award wins and six No. 1 Christian radio hits. He was described by CCM Magazine as "the Bob Dylan of Christian music".

In 2003, Webb left Caedmon's Call to pursue a solo career. Since his departure, he has released seven studio albums (including one instrumental), a live album, two compilation albums, two covers projects, two DVDs, and two EPs (with his then-wife, Sandra McCracken). While these have been less commercially successful than his work with Caedmon's Call, Webb has had more of a free hand to shape his work to his vision.

== Early life ==
Webb's mother, a gifted classically trained pianist, encouraged his musical interests at a very young age. Music came naturally to him, and he began to play the guitar at six years old. Concerning his musical training, Webb explains that he got his ear for music from his mother, but not the ability to read music, and that he "took one [guitar] lesson and then just taught myself out of the book." While in high school, he became known for his skill on the guitar. He toured with a band, though it broke up in his junior year following a serious car accident returning from playing a show at Baylor University. Webb graduated from Klein High School in Klein, Texas, in 1992. Before joining Caedmon's Call, he went to community college in Houston for half a semester, and shared an apartment with his older brother who was attending medical school.

== Caedmon's Call ==
Caedmon's Call was formed in 1993 by Cliff Young, Danielle Glenn, Todd Bragg, and Aaron Tate. Tate, however, never intended to tour with the band, and was included in a songwriting capacity only, sharing those duties with Webb who also played lead guitar.

Webb's invitation to join Caedmon's Call came from Tate, who at the time was attending Texas Christian University in Fort Worth, Texas. Shortly afterward, Webb made the trip to Fort Worth and met future bandmate Cliff Young. Webb says, "I essentially just joined that band immediately. And as soon as I joined the band, I quit college the same day." As a result, for almost a full school year he pretended to go to class, with his family unaware he was actually pursuing the band in lieu of going to school.

In June 1994, the band released their first album, My Calm // Your Storm, originally a cassette-only demo recording. It was re-printed twice the same year with different cover art each time. In 1996 the band signed with now-defunct Christian label Warner Alliance, producing their self-titled release. Peaking at 110 on the Billboard 200, the album went on to win the GMA 1998 Modern Rock Album of the Year.

After the collapse of Warner Alliance in 1998, Caedmon's Call signed to Essential Records, where they released 40 Acres (1999), Long Line of Leavers (2000), In the Company of Angels: A Call to Worship (2001), Back Home (2003). All of these albums were moderately successful, peaking at 61, 58, 72, and 66 respectively on the Billboard 200. Notably, Webb did not provide any songwriting for In the Company of Angels or Back Home, despite having been a primary songwriter for the band prior to their release. During this time period, Webb also contributed to City on a Hill: Songs of Worship and Praise (2000) and City on a Hill: Sing Alleluia (2002), both as a member of Caedmon's Call and as a solo artist, which respectively garnered the GMA 2001 & 2003 Special Event Album of the Year awards.

In 2001, Webb left the band to pursue his solo career, although he continued to contribute to their next album Back Home. Caedmon's Call then released Chronicles 1992–2004 (2004), a best-of collection of the band's work, which included work by Webb. In 2007, Caedmon's Call signed onto INO Records, and Webb was featured as singer and songwriter on the album, Overdressed. He continued to be involved with the band as producer on the 2011 album Raising Up the Dead.

Webb has considered himself a solo act since 2001, but admits his continued collaboration with the band can make it seem like he never left, saying "Caedmon's Call, as it turns out, is very much like hotel california: you can check out anytime you’d like, but you can never really leave."

== Solo career ==
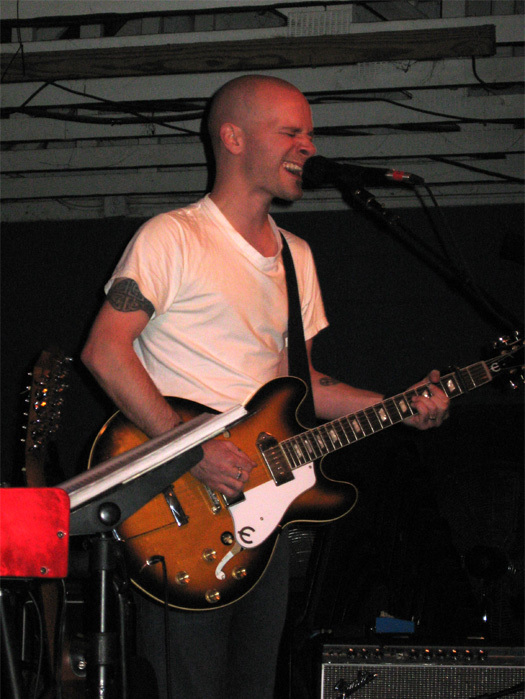
Webb performing live in Asheville, North Carolina, in November 2007

His first solo album, She Must and Shall Go Free (2003) caused controversy when some Christian retailers refused to stock the album for its use of "strong" language. One of the songs that was the basis for controversy was "Wedding Dress" where Webb compares Christians who seek fulfillment in things outside of Christ to a person committing adultery. An introspective tune, Webb writes that "I am a whore I do confess / I put you on just like a wedding dress". Another song that generated controversy was "Saint and Sinner" where Webb wrote "I used to be a damned mess but now I look just fine, 'Cause you dressed me up and we drank the finest wine". The word 'damned' was removed from the final version of the album, at the request of two major Christian retailers. Following the release of She Must and Shall Go Free, Webb embarked on a national tour in which he played living room concerts. This provided the opportunity to have greater interaction with his listeners. He went on to release a live album in 2004 from tour: The House Show.

His second solo studio record, I See Things Upside Down (2004), generated mixed reviews. I See Things Upside Down was not marketed to the same typical Christian music radio stations that She Must and Shall Go Free and his work with Caedmon's Call was, though the album still has explicitly Christian lyrics. In comparison to Webb's previous work, this album has what's been referred to as an "experimental" style to it, and has been compared to the music of Wilco in that respect. Webb has stated that the album "was doing away with people's expectations to free me up to do what I wanted." Following the release of I See Things Upside Down, Webb released a live concert DVD, How to Kill and Be Killed (2005).

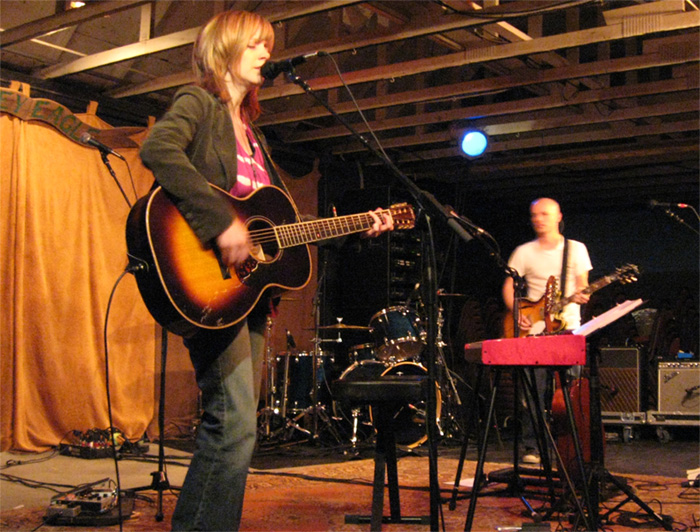
Webb and then-wife Sandra McCracken performing in Asheville, North Carolina, in November 2007

His third studio album, Mockingbird, was released on December 26, 2005. The album touches on subjects such as politics, social justice, and war. Webb has stated that he tackled these subjects to stimulate discussion and engage people to bring about changes in what he sees as some of the greatest problems the world is facing today. To broaden this discussion to people less inclined to purchase his album, beginning September 1, 2006, Webb offered Mockingbird for free on the website Free Derek Webb (no longer exists), where it was available for download until December 1, 2006. Over 80,000 free copies of the album were downloaded during this time.

On January 30, 2007, Webb released two EPs, each containing the same ten songs from earlier in his solo career, including pieces from each of his three solo studio albums. One Zero (Acoustic), contains acoustic reinterpretations of the songs, and is available in stores only. One Zero (Remix) makes use of the original recording sessions for each of the songs, but has been remixed by engineer Will Hunt. This more experimental record is available only online.

Webb's next project, The Ringing Bell was released on May 1, 2007. Before the release date, it was available for pre-order at TheRingingBell.com in a deluxe edition which included a 96-page graphic novel inspired by the album. Those who pre-ordered the deluxe edition of the album were also able to immediately download it in its entirety.

On May 12, 2009, Webb sent a message to his email mailing list stating that his next album Stockholm Syndrome was deemed too controversial for his record label to release. "It seems I've finally found the line beyond which my label can support me, and apparently I've crossed it," Webb writes. "[A]t this point we're not sure when the record will come out and in what form. The majority of the controversy is surrounding one song, which I consider to be among the most important songs on the record …. [B]ecause of various legal/publishing issues we're having to be rather careful with how we do what we're going to do next.".

Webb's solo release Stockholm Syndrome was released on his website, derekwebb.com, on July 7, 2009, as a digital release. He has also made physical copies of both the edited and unedited versions of the CD available by September 1, 2009.

In late 2011 Derek Webb collaborated on the soundtrack for the film, Nexus.

On September 3, 2013, Webb released I Was Wrong, I'm Sorry & I Love You.

On September 29, 2017, Webb released Fingers Crossed which was promoted as "a deeply personal tale of two divorces," touching on themes of his marriage ending and his loss of faith.

On February 21, 2020, Webb released Targets with the tagline, "the time for grief is over".

On April 7, 2023, Webb released The Jesus Hypothesis, an album about finding meaning and beauty and exploring issues of gender identity and sexuality. In 2023, Webb also collaborated with Flamy Grant, which resulted in Grant going viral.

On April 18, 2025, Webb released Survival Songs that focuses on centering the experiences of queer people living in the United States.

== Business ventures ==
While on tour, Webb noticed that attendance at his shows had increased dramatically after he had made Mockingbird available for free online. Inspired by that realization, Webb helped form NoiseTrade, a website that allows users to download music for free from independent musicians.

== Personal life ==
On April 17, 2014, Webb and his then-wife, singer-songwriter Sandra McCracken, announced that they were divorcing after thirteen years of marriage due to Webb having had an extramarital affair.

Webb later married Abbie Parker of the Christian music band I Am They.

== Discography ==
=== Studio albums ===
- 2003: She Must and Shall Go Free
- 2004: I See Things Upside Down
- 2005: Mockingbird
- 2007: One Zero (Acoustic)
- 2007: The Ringing Bell
- 2009: Stockholm Syndrome
- 2010: Feedback
- 2012: Ctrl
- 2013: I Was Wrong, I'm Sorry & I Love You
- 2017: Fingers Crossed
- 2020: Targets
- 2023: The Jesus Hypothesis
- 2025: Survival Songs

=== Live albums ===
- 2004: The House Show
- 2005: How to Kill and Be Killed (DVD)
- 2005: iTunes Unplugged EP
- 2015: Mockingbird Live: The 10 Year Anniversary Concert
- 2019: Stockholm Syndrome: Live in Texas

=== EPs ===
- 2008: Ampersand (with Sandra McCracken)
- 2011: Tennessee (with Sandra McCracken)
- 2021: The Songs That Made Me: Rich Mullins
- 2023: Xmas Songs
- 2025: Fruit on the Tree

=== Other releases ===
- 2007: One Zero (Remix) (remix album)
- 2009: Paradise Is a Parking Lot (documentary DVD)
- 2010: Democracy, Vol. 1 (demo compilation album)
- 2011: Democracy, Vol. 2 (demo compilation album)
- 2012: Nexus (film soundtrack, with Sola-Mi)
- 2016: Re:Mockingbird (remix album)
