= Relevant (magazine) =

American Christian lifestyle magazine

- Relevant No. 7, March/April 2004
- Editor: Cameron Strang
- Categories: Lifestyle, Christian magazines
- Frequency: bimonthly
- Circulation: 70,000 (2010)
- First issue: March/April 2003
- Company: RELEVANT Media Group
- Country: United States
- Based in: Winter Park, Florida
- Website: relevantmagazine.com
- ISSN: 1543-317X

Relevant is an American bi-monthly Christian lifestyle magazine published by Relevant Media Group since 2003. It is now fully-digital, but the print magazine once claimed an average circulation of 70,000.

== History ==
In June 2001, Cameron Strang, son of Charisma Magazine publisher, and Strang Communications CEO Stephen Strang, founded the media company Relevant Media Group. The company began publishing Relevant in March 2003. One critic has called the publication "the mass media equivalent of outreach in the skate park." As of 2006, it was distributed nationally at Barnes & Noble and other retailers, including the Family Christian bookstore chain.

In its early years, contributors to the print magazine included John Fischer, Dan Haseltine (Jars of Clay), Don Chaffer (Waterdeep), and Dan Buck. Relevant ran articles about faith, life in your 20s and 30s, social justice, and interviews with musicians and authors such as Donald Miller, Bob Goff, The Avett Brothers, Rob Bell, and The Civil Wars.

In 2005, Relevant Media Group created a women's magazine, Radiant, which published 12 issues from 2005–2007.

In 2008, Relevant Media Group launched a magazine for church leaders, Neue.

In 2011, Relevant launched a free semi-annual social justice magazine, Reject Apathy. It was included with Relevant subscriptions.

Relevant launched its interactive iPad edition in September 2011.

According to a demographic study in 2012, 86% of Relevant's subscribers were between the ages of 18 and 39 (the average subscriber's age was 27).

In September 2020, Relevant announced the suspension of its print edition, shifting to an all-digital format and maintaining its bi-monthly release schedule.

== RelevantMagazine.com ==
The magazine's companion web presence, relevantmagazine.com, launched in 2002 with the email newsletter, "850 Words of Relevant" (now called "Relevant This Week").

The website is updated daily and is a counterpart to the magazine. It includes daily features, news ("slices"), columns, reviews, and features such as "The Drop" and "RELEVANT.tv".

== Relevant podcast ==
Relevant releases a new podcast every Monday and Thursday. The podcast won the 2015 Academy of Podcasters Awards in the Spirituality & Religion category.
