= Sandra McCracken =

American musical artist (born 1977)

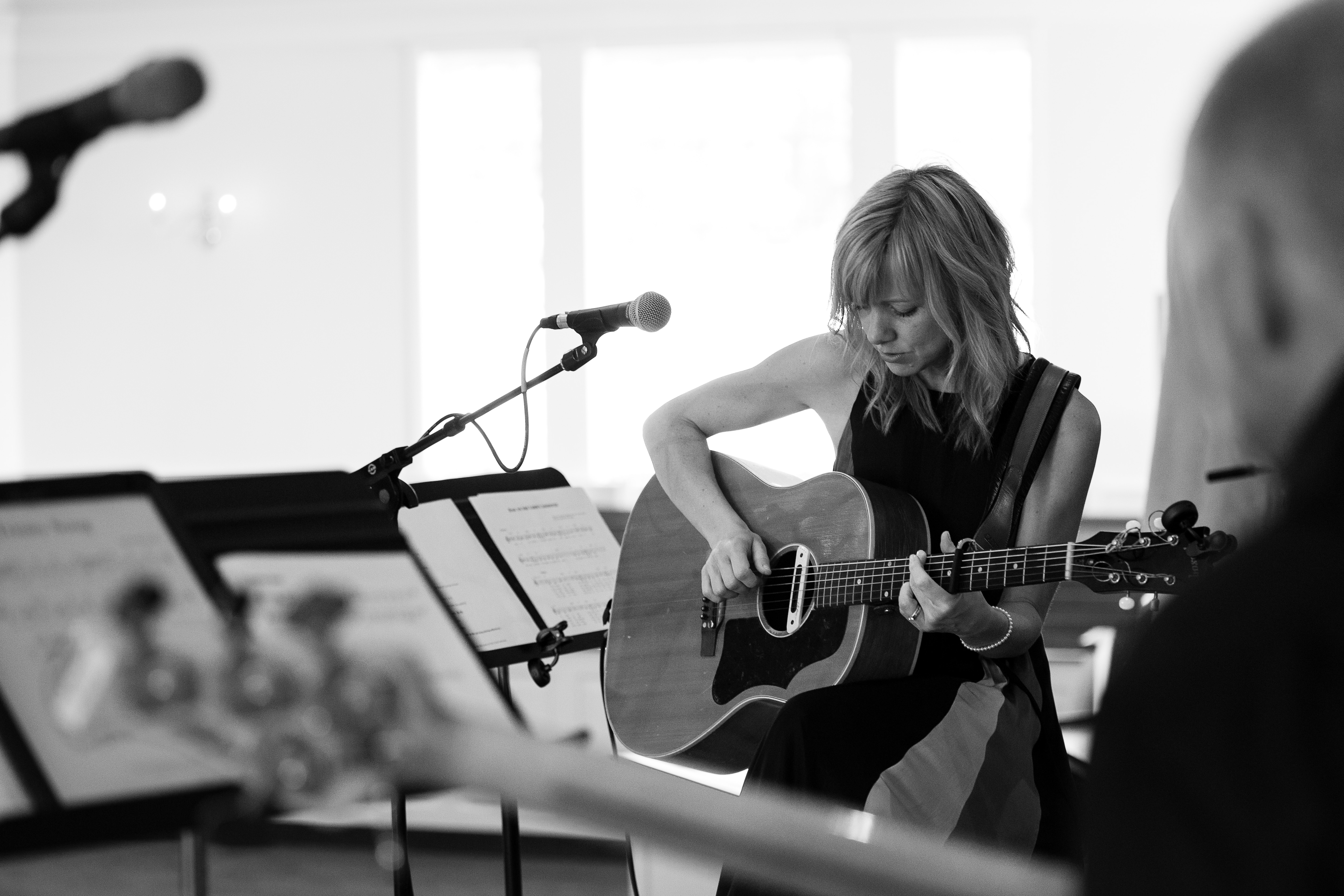
- Sandra McCracken performing in 2018

Background information
- Born: Sandra Marie McCracken; June 16, 1977 (age 48)
- Origin: St. Louis, Missouri, United States
- Genres: Americana, folk, gospel music
- Occupations: Singer, songwriter
- Years active: 1999–present
- Labels: Shell, Towhee, Integrity Music
- Website: sandramccracken.com

Sandra Marie McCracken (born June 16, 1977) is an independent singer-songwriter. She currently resides in Nashville, Tennessee. Drawing from folk, gospel, and hymn traditions, her music often weaves together storytelling and scripture. McCracken is a founding member of the Indelible Grace artist collective based in Nashville. She won the 2023 GMA Dove Award for Bluegrass/Country/Roots Album of the Year for her album Light in the Canyon.

== Background ==
As a singer-songwriter, McCracken has penned and co-written songs for Caedmon's Call (on albums In the Company of Angels, Back Home, and Overdressed) as well as for Derek Webb's solo release, She Must and Shall Go Free, BiFrost Arts recordings, All Sons & Daughters, Audrey Assad and others. McCracken has recorded fifteen studio albums of her own.

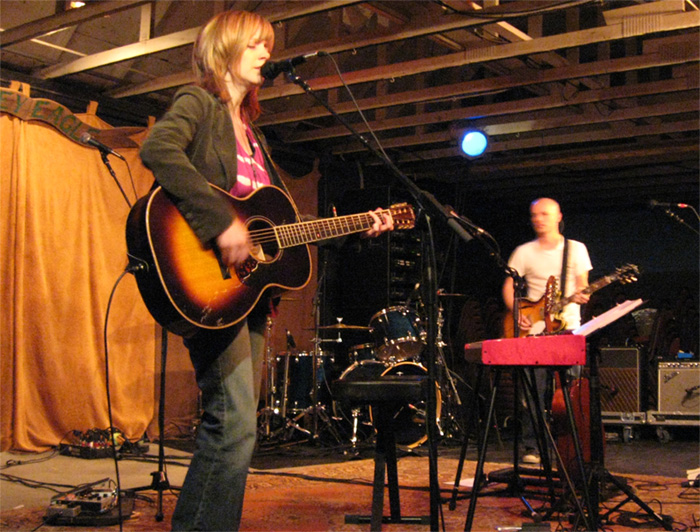
McCracken and Derek Webb performing at the Grey Eagle in Asheville, NC on November 6, 2007.

McCracken grew up in St. Louis, Missouri and attended Westminster Christian Academy. As a child, McCracken would harmonize in the church choir, accompany groups on the piano, sing solos in church, and write new hymns for her congregation to sing.

== Professional career ==
McCracken began her musical career shortly after graduating from Belmont University in 1999. She independently released two albums, The Crucible and Gypsy Flat Road in 2000, and 2001 respectively.

In late 2003, McCracken recorded Best Laid Plans with engineer, Ray Kennedy (Twang Trust) and producer, Peter Collins. In mid-2004, McCracken signed the album to Shell Records in London, headed by Dave Robinson. Shell released the album in the UK, followed by two radio singles, "Last Goodbye" and "No More Tears", which received significant airplay and attention across England, Scotland, Wales and Ireland.

In 2005, McCracken released The Builder and the Architect, an album of hymns. The same team that worked on Best Laid Plans came together again in February 2006 to record album number five, Gravity / Love which was released in September 2006. In 2010, McCracken released In Feast or Fallow, another album of hymns, recorded at her home studio in East Nashville.

In addition to her solo recordings, she co-founded the children's music collective, Rain for Roots, in 2012, with fellow singer-songwriters Ellie Holcomb, Katy Bowser, and Flo Paris. This collective has released four albums, Big Stories for Little Ones—with lyrics written by British author Sally Lloyd-Jones—The Kingdom of Heaven Is Like This, Waiting Songs, and All Creatures.

Desire Like Dynamite, released in February 2013, explores deeper dimensions of sound and grace.

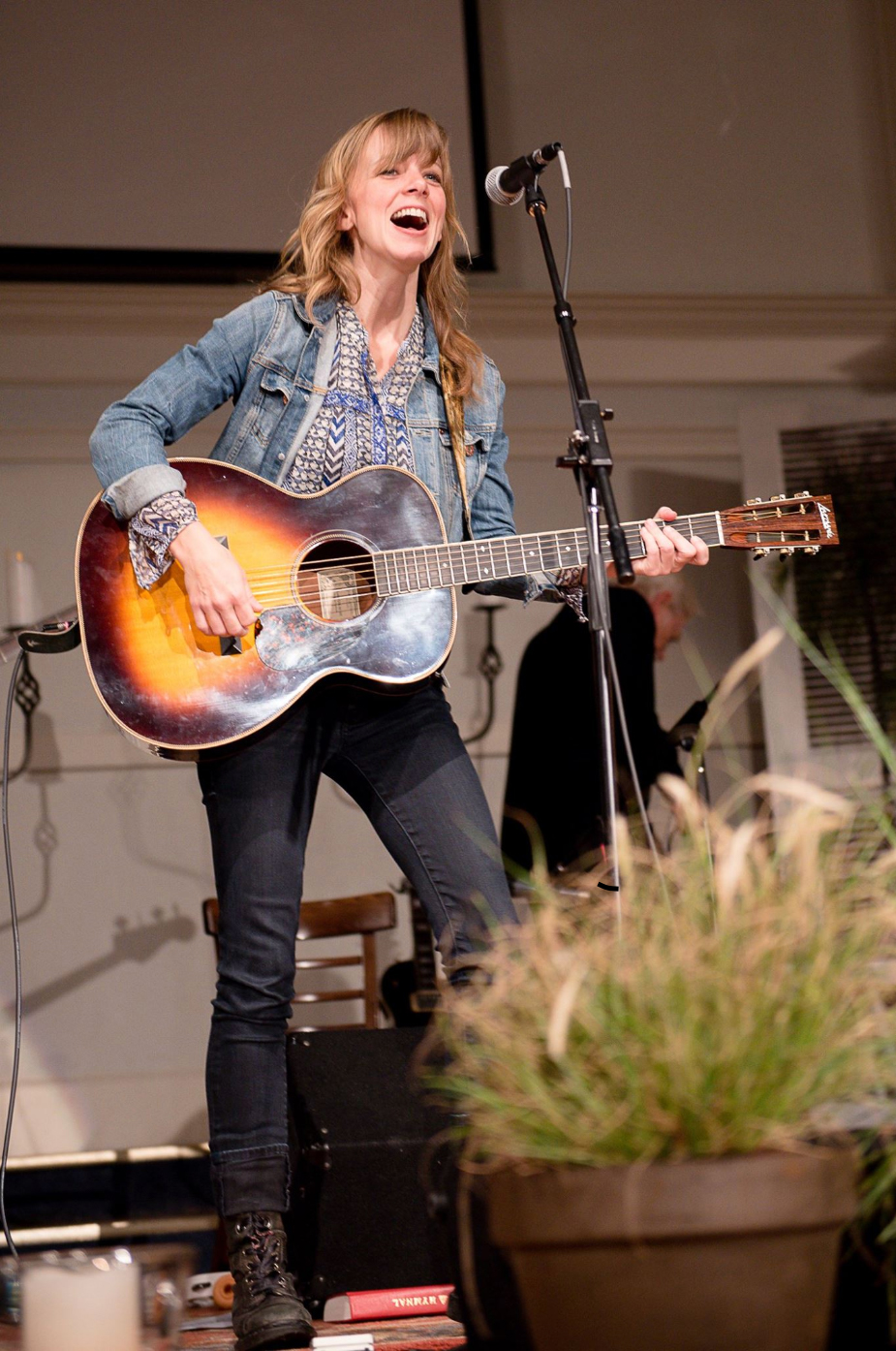
McCracken performing in July 2015

In 2015, McCracken's Psalms album was released without a label, and it charted No. 18 on the Billboard Americana/Folk charts. This critically acclaimed release marked a shift in McCracken's music as she began writing songs for people to sing together. After releasing Psalms, McCracken toured and co-wrote significantly with the Grammy-winning Christian duo All Sons & Daughters.

In 2016, she released God's Highway and it placed No. 49 in the Billboard Heatseekers Chart upon release. It went on to reach No. 20 on the Billboard Americana/Folk charts.

In 2017 she began writing a column on spirituality and creativity for Christianity Today. The same year, McCracken published the Steadfast podcast. In 2020, McCracken released Patient Kingdom. The following year, she published the second season of the Steadfast podcast, with the theme of patience.

In 2022, McCracken released two solo albums, Carry Each Other and Light in the Canyon. Carry Each Other (February) is an album of covers, including One by U2, Everybody Hurts by R.E.M., and others. Light in the Canyon (July) contains many songs she has released on previous albums, with a jazz twist.

Later in the year, she released an EP, titled November Songs, with a band project called Shadowlands. Shadowlands is composed of Luke Laird, Brett Taylor, and Sandra McCracken. The songs of the EP were written in the November of 2021, and released in September of 2022.

McCracken lists her musical influences as Joni Mitchell, Emmylou Harris, Bob Dylan, Tom Petty and Johnny Cash. Her songs have been recorded by All Sons & Daughters, Audrey Assad, Bifrost Arts, Caedmon's Call and others, and her music has been featured on ABC's Grey's Anatomy.

== Personal life ==
On April 17, 2014, McCracken and her then-husband, fellow singer-songwriter Derek Webb, announced that their marriage was coming to an end after thirteen years due to Webb's extramarital affair. McCracken married Tim Nicholson, a church musician, in 2018.

== Discography ==
Studio albums

- 2000 – The Crucible
- 2001 – Gypsy Flat Road
- 2004 – Best Laid Plans
- 2005 – The Builder and the Architect
- 2006 – Gravity / Love
- 2008 – Ampersand EP (with Derek Webb)
- 2008 – Red Balloon
- 2010 – In Feast or Fallow
- 2011 – TN EP (with Derek Webb)
- 2013 – Desire Like Dynamite
- 2015 – Psalms
- 2016 – God's Highway
- 2018 – Songs from the Valley
- 2019 – Christmas
- 2020 – Patient Kingdom
- 2022 – Carry Each Other (covers)
- 2022 – Light in the Canyon[28]

Live albums

- 2009 – Live Under Lights and Wires
- 2017 – Steadfast Live

With Rain for Roots

- 2012 – Big Stories for Little Ones (with Ellie Holcomb, Katy Bowser, Flo Paris, words by Sally Lloyd-Jones)
- 2014 – The Kingdom of Heaven is Like This (with Ellie Holcomb, Katy Bowser, Flo Paris)
- 2015 – Waiting Songs (with Katy Bowser, Flo Paris, and others)
- 2020 – All Creatures (with Katy Bowser, Flo Paris, and others)

With Shadowlands

- 2022 – November Songs (with Luke Laird and Brett Taylor)

With Paper Horses

- 2024 – Paper Horses (EP) (with Jess Ray, Taylor Leonhardt, and Leslie Jordan)
