= Counting Stars (album) =

Studio album by Andrew Peterson
- Released: July 27, 2010
- Recorded: January, 2010
- Studios: Eagelmont Studios (Winthrop, Washington): Night Owl's Nest, The Beehive, True Tone Recording, The Attic and Pentavarit (Nashville, Tennessee)
- Genres: Contemporary Christian music, folk rock
- Length: 43:36
- Label: Centricity
- Producer: Andy Gullahorn: Ben Shive

Andrew Peterson chronology
Resurrection Letters, Volume Two (2008)	Counting Stars (2010)	Light for the Lost Boy (2012)

Counting Stars is the ninth studio album by the American contemporary Christian musician Andrew Peterson. It was released through Centricity Music on July 27, 2010.

== Background ==
Peterson worked with Andy Gullahorn and Ben Shive, in the production of this album. Centricity Music released the album on July 27, 2010.

== Critical reception ==
Professional ratings
Review scores
Source	Rating
AllMusic	3.5/5 stars
CCM Magazine	4/5 stars
Christianity Today	4/5 stars
Cross Rhythms	10/10 squares
Jesus Freak Hideout	4.5/5 stars
Louder Than the Music	4/5 stars

James Christopher Monger, rating the album three and a half stars for AllMusic, says, "Counting Stars may walk a familiar line, but with songs as effortless and engaging as 'Many Roads' and 'World Traveler,' it makes for a fine afternoon stroll." Awarding the album four stars from CCM Magazine, Andrew Greer states, "And what others hear as dirges of human despair, Peterson's infamous imagination transforms into fantastical carols of hope." Josh Hurst, giving the album four star at Christianity Today, writes, "On Counting Stars, Peterson is just a humble folksinger, his music tasteful and elegant, and never flashy." Indicating in a perfect ten review by Cross Rhythms, Paul Kerslake recognizes, "Folk-orientated music can sometimes become a bit repetitive, but the combination of finely-crafted songs and adept musicianship raises this album to the highest level." Laura Nunnery Love, signaling in a four and a half star review from Jesus Freak Hideout, describes, "Counting Stars is another success for Andrew Peterson, and the last five songs prove the artist can stretch beyond his comfort zone."

Reviewing the album for Worship Leader, Jeremy Armstrong responds, "Each of the 12 songs are beautifully sedate, yet winsomely inviting; they stand as poetic jewels...in such a sublime maze of intricate loveliness that everything kind of melds together." Timothy Estabrooks, assigning a four and a half star review to the album, replies, "Due to its less pop oriented nature, Counting Stars is perhaps not the most accessible of Peterson's albums, but to those who are already familiar with his work, it is yet another beautiful masterpiece displaying his delightful ability to create beauty in simplicity." Specifying in a four star review at Louder Than the Music, Jono Davies calls, Counting Stars "some amazing poetic music." Rebecca Rycross, penning a review for Christian Music Review, recognizes, "this is a superb album! Andrew Peterson has outdone himself. His vocals are better than ever, his writing gets more and more captivating with each new album. He is a true artist."

== Track listing ==
No.	Title	Writer(s)	Length
1.	"Many Roads"	Peterson	4:22
2.	"Dancing in the Minefields"	Peterson	3:30
3.	"Planting Trees"	Peterson	3:31
4.	"The Magic Hour"	Don Chaffer, Peterson	3:39
5.	"World Traveler"	Peterson	4:06
6.	"Isle of Skye"	Peterson	1:34
7.	"God of My Fathers"	Peterson, Ben Shive	3:59
8.	"Fool with a Fancy Guitar"	Peterson	2:30
9.	"In the Night"	Andy Gullahorn, Peterson, Shive	4:21
10.	"You Come so Close"	Peterson	3:29
11.	"The Last Frontier"	Peterson	3:28
12.	"The Reckoning (How Long)"	Andrew Osenga, Peterson	5:07
Total length:			48:52

== Chart performance ==
Chart (2010)	Peak position
US Billboard 200	123
US Top Christian Albums (Billboard)	7

== Personnel ==
- Andrew Peterson – lead vocals, acoustic piano, accordion, acoustic guitars, banjo
- Ben Shive – acoustic piano, keyboards, accordion, Hammond B3 organ, harmonium, programming, percussion, timbales, backing vocals, string arrangements
- Gabe Scott – acoustic piano, keyboards, banjo, bouzouki, dobro, lap steel guitar, hammered dulcimer, percussion, timbales, backing vocals
- Andy Gullahorn – accordion, acoustic guitars, electric guitars, bouzouki, mandolin, backing vocals
- Andrew Osenga – electric guitars
- James Gregory – bass
- Ken Lewis – drums, percussion
- John Mark Painter – horns
- Stuart Duncan – fiddle, string arrangements
- David Henry – cello, violin
- Randall Goodgame – backing vocals
- Jason Gray – backing vocals
- Sara Groves – backing vocals
- Melanie Penn – backing vocals
- Eric Peters – backing vocals
- Jill Phillips – backing vocals

=== Production ===
- Andy Gullahorn – producer
- Ben Shive – producer
- Todd Robbins – engineer
- Shane D. Wilson – mixing
- Erin Kraus – mix assistant
- Lani Crump – mix coordinator
- Bob Boyd – mastering at Ambient Digital (Houston, Texas)
- Whit Elam – sound ideas
- Micah Kandros – photography
- Brannon McCallister – design, layout
