= The Far Country (album) =

Studio album by Andrew Peterson
- Released: August 30, 2005
- Recorded: February–May 2005
- Studios: The Velvet Eagle, Fireside Studios and Submerge Studios (Nashville, Tennessee)
- Genres: Christian pop, Christian rock, folk rock
- Length: 42:31
- Label: Fervent
- Producer: Ben Shive

Andrew Peterson chronology
Behold the Lamb of God (2004)	The Far Country (2005)	Resurrection Letters, Volume Two (2008)

The Far Country is the sixth album by the American singer-songwriter Andrew Peterson, released in 2005. The title is from a quote by Meister Eckhart, a 16th-century German spiritual teacher that says, "God is at home. We are in the far country."

== Background ==
Peterson worked with Ben Shive, in the production of this album. Fervent Records released the album on August 30, 2005.

== Critical reception ==
Professional ratings
Review scores
Source	Rating
AllMusic	4.5/5 stars
CCM Magazine	A
Christian Broadcasting Network	4/5 spins
Christianity Today	4.5/5 stars
Cross Rhythms	7/10 squares
Jesus Freak Hideout	4.5/5 stars
The Phantom Tollbooth	4.5/5

Awarding the album four and a half stars at AllMusic, Jared Johnson states, "The Far Country saw Andrew Peterson going to great lengths to create a thought-provoking acoustic concept album, a sparkling feat indeed considering how dry the CCM-folk well had run by 2005." David Mackle, rating the album an A for CCM Magazine, writes, "The Far Country, exudes a pride swallowing intimacy that begs you to bend your ear its way and then pushes you toward hope...Peterson is writing his own legacy, and you need to hear it." Giving the album four and a half stars from Christianity Today, Russ Breimeier says, "Peterson excels with relatable lyrics grounded in both Scripture and everyday life, thus communicating timeless truths, rather than merely reciting them." Jennifer E. Jones, indicating in a four spins review by Christian Broadcasting Network, replies, "His signature sound of quiet folk has barely changed a note, which works for Peterson because it allows his stellar lyric-writing skills to shine." Signaling in a four and a half star review at Jesus Freak Hideout, Laura Nunnery describes, "Peterson's songs may have a folk sound, but they are anything but boring." Michael Dalton, rating the album a four and a half from The Phantom Tollbooth, responds, "Andrew Peterson directs us toward home in a way that makes it a little easier to live in the far country...This is a look to heaven that alternates between hope, yearning and joy." Giving the album a seven out of ten for Cross Rhythms, Mike Rimmer recognizes, "Elsewhere the acoustic sounds, poppy melodies and sensitive arrangements make this a winner if not a little derivative of Mullins' oeuvre."

== Track listing ==
All tracks are written by Andrew Peterson unless otherwise noted.

No.	Title	Writer(s)	Length
1.	"The Far Country"	Peterson, Ben Shive	4:35
2.	"Lay Me Down"		4:07
3.	"Queen of Iowa"		3:58
4.	"Little Boy Heart Alive"		4:36
5.	"The Haven's Grey"	Peterson, Shive	3:58
6.	"Mystery of Mercy"	Randall Goodgame, Peterson	3:19
7.	"Mountains on the Ocean Floor"		4:54
8.	"All Shall Be Well"		4:33
9.	"For the Love of God"		5:03
10.	"More"	Peterson, Pierce Pettis	3:28
Total length:			42:31

== Personnel ==
- Andrew Peterson – lead vocals, acoustic guitar, backing vocals (3, 5), bouzouki (4), ocarina (4)
- Ben Shive – acoustic piano, keyboards, ocarina (4), backing vocals (4, 7, 8), accordion (5), hammered dulcimer (6), Rhodes electric piano (7), percussion (7), Hammond B3 organ (8)
- Andrew Osenga – electric guitars, backing vocals, resonator guitar (4), bouzouki (4), ocarina (4), mandolin (5)
- Andy Gullahorn – acoustic guitar (2, 3, 9, 10), backing vocals (10)
- Danny O'Lannerghty – bass (1–9), double bass (10)
- Akil Thompson – drums (1–9)
- Paul Eckberg – percussion (1, 2, 4–6, 8–10)
- Ken Lewis – percussion (2, 3, 6–9)
- Kurt Heinecke – Irish whistle (1, 4)
- Stuart Duncan – fiddle (10)
- Jill Phillips – backing vocals (1, 10)
- Ben Peters – backing vocals (4)
- Jason Fuller – backing vocals (7)
- Anklejelly Jones – backing vocals (8)
- Jimmy Hoyt-Washington – backing vocals (8)

=== Production ===
- Pedro Garcia – executive producer
- Jamie Peterson – executive producer
- Beth Shive – executive producer
- Ben Shive – producer
- Derri Daugherty – engineer
- Josh Davis – engineer, mixing (3, 5, 8–10)
- Andrew Osenga – engineer
- Ben Wisch – mixing (1, 2, 4, 6, 7)
- Bob Boyd – mastering at Ambient Digital (Houston, Texas)
