= The Morning (Andrew Osenga album) =

Studio album by Andrew Osenga
- Released: June 2006
- Recorded: The Velvet Eagle, Nashville, TN
- Genre: Singer-Songwriter
- Length: 51:00
- Label: House of Mirrors Music
- Producer: Andrew Osenga, Cason Cooley

Andrew Osenga chronology
Souvenirs and Postcards (2004)	The Morning (2006)	Letters to the Editor, Vol. 1 (2007)

Professional ratings
Review scores
Source	Rating
Christianity Today	(not rated)

The Morning (2006) is a studio album from Andrew Osenga. It is his second solo full-length studio album, following the short EP Souvenirs and Postcards (2004).

== Track listing ==
1. "In Gym Class in High School" – 0:34
2. "After the Garden" – 3:51
3. "White Dove" – 4:32
4. "Following the Blind" – 3:14
5. "Farmer's Wife" – 1:11
6. "Santa Barbara" – 5:28
7. "Dance Away the City" – 4:10
8. "Marilyn" – 3:39
9. "House of Mirrors" – 4:41
10. "Just a Kid" – 1:39
11. "Trying to Get This Right" – 5:14
12. "All the Wrong Reasons" – 1:15
13. "New Beginning" – 5:33
14. "Early in the Morning" – 5:59

== Credits ==
- Andrew Osenga—vocals, piano, Hammond organ, baritone, keyboard, acoustic guitar, electric guitar, trombone, trumpet, programming, upright bass, pad, high-strung electric guitar, percussion, mando 12-string, organ, Nord bass
- Cason Cooley—guitar, Rhodes piano, piano, organ, wurlitzer, Nord bass, omnichord
- Will Sayles—drums
- Jeff Irwin—bass guitar
- David Grant—tambourine, percussion
- Paul Eckberg—drums, percussion, ghost hi-hat
- Ken Lewis—drums, percussion loop
- Aaron Sands—bass guitar
- Marcus Myers—hammer dulcimer, bridge bass
- Phil Madeira—Hammond B3
- Chris Weigel—bass guitar
- Paul Moak—vibes, pedal steel, mando 12-string, swells, background vocals
- Jeff Pardo—keyboard
- Garett Buell—tablas, reco-reco, djembe, cacici, udu, genkoge, bayan, bells
- Jeremy Casella—piano, harmony vocals
- Kenny Hutson—pedal steel
- Matthew Perryman Jones—electric guitar
- Ben Shive—key pad, background vocals
- Randall Goodgame—background vocals
- Andrew Peterson—background vocals
- Dean Baylor—background vocals
- Mark Lockett—background vocals
- Chris Mason—background vocals
- Alison Osenga—background vocals
