= Behold the Lamb of God =

Studio album by Andrew Peterson
- Released: 2004
- Studios: Dark Horse Recording, The Park and The Velvet Eagle (Nashville, Tennessee)
- Genres: Christian pop, Christian rock, folk rock, roots rock, country gospel, folk, rock, country, bluegrass, blues
- Length: 43:43
- Label: Fervent
- Producers: Ben Shive: Andrew Osenga; Andrew Peterson

Andrew Peterson chronology
Love and Thunder (2003)	Behold the Lamb of God (2004)	The Far Country (2005)

Professional ratings
Review scores
Source	Rating
Cross Rhythms	(CD)
The Phantom Tollbooth	4/5 (CD); 4/5 (CD); 4.5/5 (DVD)

Behold the Lamb of God (subtitled "The True Tall Tale of the Coming of Christ") is the fifth album by the American singer/songwriter Andrew Peterson. Released in 2004, it is a concept album that traces the Biblical story of the advent of Jesus.

Each December, Peterson travels the country with fellow musicians to present Behold the Lamb of God. The first half of the concert features individual performances of songs written by the guest artists on the tour. The second half is spent performing the complete album. The tour culminates in an annual performance in the Ryman Auditorium in Nashville. Guests who have participated in past shows include Nickel Creek, Ron Block, Garett Buell, Caleb Chapman of Colony House, Thad Cockrell, Cason Cooley, Jason Gray, Sara Groves, Andy Gullahorn, Brandon Heath, Ellie Holcomb, Jenny & Tyler, Matthew Perryman Jones, Phil Keaggy, Alison Krauss, Phil Madeira, Sandra McCracken, Buddy Miller, Cindy Morgan, Jonathan & Amanda Noël, Bebo Norman, Fernando Ortega, Andrew Osenga, Eric Peters, Pierce Pettis, Jill Phillips, Gabe Scott, Ben Shive, Derek Webb, David Wilcox, The Arcadian Wild, and Jess Ray.

A new edition of the album was released on October 25, 2019.

== Track listing ==
All songs by Andrew Peterson unless otherwise noted.

1. "Gather 'Round, Ye Children, Come" – 3:18
2. "Passover Us" – 4:33
3. "So Long, Moses" – 6:13
4. "Deliver Us" – 3:50
5. "O Come, O Come Emmanuel" – 2:31
6. "Matthew's Begats" – 2:17
7. "It Came to Pass" – 2:50
8. "Labor of Love" (featuring Jill Phillips) – 4:32
9. "The Holly and the Ivy" (Ben Shive) – 1:53
10. "While Shepherds Watched Their Flocks" (Nahum Tate) – 3:23
11. "Behold the Lamb of God" (Andrew Peterson, Laura Story) – 4:02
12. "The Theme of My Song (reprise)" – 4:21

== Personnel ==
- Andrew Peterson – lead vocals, acoustic guitar, bouzouki (1)
- Ben Shive – acoustic piano (1–4, 7, 10–12), Hammond B3 organ (1–4, 7, 10–12), accordion (1), acoustic guitar (1), lap dulcimer (1), string orchestration (1, 3, 4, 7, 10–12)
- Andrew Osenga – electric guitars (1–4, 7, 10–12), backing vocals (1–4, 7, 10–12)
- Steve Hindalong – percussion (7, 9, 10, 12)
- Glipwood Town Orchestra – strings (1, 3, 4, 7, 10–12)
- Jill Phillips – vocals (8)
