= Resurrection Letters, Volume Two =

Studio album by Andrew Peterson
- Released: October 21, 2008
- Recorded: Fall 2007
- Studios: The Night Owl's Rest, Sputnik Studio and Paul Eckberg Studio (Nashville, Tennessee): Studio at Mole End (Franklin, Tennessee)
- Genres: Christian pop, folk rock
- Length: 40:26
- Label: Centricity
- Producer: Andy Gullahorn: Ben Shive

Andrew Peterson chronology
Appendix M: Media / Music / Movies (2007)	Resurrection Letters, Volume Two (2008)	Counting Stars (2010)

Resurrection Letters, Volume Two (represented as Volume II on the album cover) is the tenth studio album by the American singer-songwriter Andrew Peterson, released in 2008.

== Background ==
Peterson alongside Centricity Music released the album on October 21, 2008. He worked with Andy Gullahorn and Ben Shive, in the production of this album.

== Critical reception ==
Professional ratings
Review scores
Source	Rating
Christian Broadcasting Network	4/5 spins
Christian Music Planet	4/5 stars
Christianity Today	4.5/5 stars
Cross Rhythms	7/10 squares
Jesus Freak Hideout	4.5/5 stars
The Phantom Tollbooth	4.5/5

Awarding the album four and a half stars at Christianity Today, Russ Breimeier states, the album "proves Peterson to be consistently excellent." Jennifer E. Jones, rating the album four spins from Christian Broadcasting Network, writes, "Fans of his powerful storytelling through song will sink into the incredible depth of Resurrection Letters." Rating the album a four and a half out of five by The Phantom Tollbooth, Michael Dalton says, the release "is Andrew being his usual creative self." Laura Nunnery, signaling in a four-and-a-half-star review for Jesus Freak Hideout, says that he is underappreciated and that "he is never miserly when it comes to producing quality albums that are honest, poignant, and relatable." Indicating in a four-star review at Christian Music Planet, Andrew Greer describes, "Andrew Peterson ignites the fire of God in 11 songs filled with transparent lyrics and evocative melodies." Jonathan Bellamy, cautioning in a seven out of ten review from Cross Rhythms, replies, "His longevity says something about the quality of his artistry, although the lack of significant awareness perhaps indicates an artist yet to find that impacting song that will raise him to wider appeal." Worship Leader reviewed the album, where they say "Peterson is biblically expansive and catchy. That's right; he proves the two qualities are not mutually exclusive."

== Related Albums ==
Nearly 10 years later, in February 2018, Peterson released a five-song EP, Resurrection Letters: Prologue, and in March 2018 he released a nine-song LP, Resurrection Letters: Volume One.

== Track listing ==
All tracks are written by Andrew Peterson unless noted.

No.	Title	Writer(s)	Length
1.	"All Things New"	Andy Gullahorn, Andrew Peterson, Ben Shive	3:49
2.	"Hosanna"	Gullahorn, Peterson, Shive	4:11
3.	"All You'll Ever Need"	Gullahorn, Peterson, Shive	3:05
4.	"Invisible God"		3:16
5.	"Hosea"		3:56
6.	"Love Is a Good Thing"		3:05
7.	"Don't Give Up on Me"		4:31
8.	"Rocket"		4:28
9.	"Windows in the World"		3:06
10.	"I've Got News"		2:43
11.	"The Good Confession (I Believe)"	Gullahorn, Peterson, Shive	4:17
Total length:			40:26

== Personnel ==
- Andrew Peterson – vocals, acoustic guitars, hurdy-gurdy (1)
- Ben Shive – acoustic piano, keyboards, Wurlitzer electric piano, Hammond B3 organ, accordion, backing vocals, string arrangements (1, 2, 11), harp (9)
- Andy Gullahorn – acoustic guitars, electric guitars, mandolin, backing vocals, bouzouki (1)
- Andrew Osenga – electric guitars (2, 7)
- Gabe Scott – pedal steel guitar (3)
- Gary Burnette – electric guitars (4, 7, 8), electric guitar solo (5)
- Ron Block – bouzouki (5), banjo (8)
- Matt Pierson – bass (1–4, 6–11), double bass (1–4, 6–11)
- Danny O'Lannerghty – bass (5)
- Paul Eckberg – drums (1–4, 6–11), percussion (9, 10)
- Akil Thompson – drums (5)
- Ken Lewis – percussion (1, 2, 5, 7, 9–11)
- Marcus Meyers – dulcimer (1, 2), fiddle (1)
- Stuart Duncan – fiddle (6)
- The Love Sponge Strings – strings (1, 2, 11)
- Jill Phillips – backing vocals (1, 6, 9)
- Pierce Pettis – backing vocals (6)
- Don Chaffer – backing vocals (7)
- Randall Goodgame – backing vocals (8)
- Eric Peters – backing vocals (8)

Choir on "Hosanna"

- Jeremy Casella, Randall Goodgame, Jason Gray, David Heller, JJ Heller, Eric Peters, Pierce Pettis and Jill Phillips

Choir on "The Good Confession (I Believe)"

- Jeff Bourque, Jock Burgess, Sharon Frazier, Amy Goodgame, Randall Goodgame, Andy Gullahorn, Barbara Haynes, Henry Kan, Daniel Kendrick, Daniel Lowhorn, Kevin Mann, Mandy Mann, Alison Osenga, Andrew Osenga, Shawn Parks, Aedan Peterson, Asher Peterson, Jamie Peterson, Skye Peterson, Joel Petrucco, Mike Petrucco, Jeremy Pinnix, Bob Price, Drew Raines, Melissa Renke, Jane Richie, Brian Roberts, Neil Rush, Rachel Rush, Amy Scott, Drew Scott, Ben Shive, Michelle Suddoth, Ken Thomaston, Andrew Trammel and Ben Yancer

=== Production ===
- Andy Gullahorn – producer, recording
- Ben Shive – producer, recording
- Andy Hunt – recording
- Todd Robbins – mixing
- Bob Boyd – mastering at Ambient Digital (Houston, Texas)

== Chart performance ==
Chart (2010)	Peak position
US Billboard 200	128
US Top Christian Albums (Billboard)	9
US Independent Albums (Billboard)	18

== Sources ==
- https://www.allmusic.com/album/r1455861
