= Light for the Lost Boy =

Studio album by Andrew Peterson
- Released: August 28, 2012
- Genres: Contemporary Christian music, folk rock
- Length: 48:52
- Label: Centricity
- Producer: Cason Cooley: Ben Shive

Andrew Peterson chronology
Counting Stars (2010)	Light for the Lost Boy (2012)	The Burning Edge of Dawn (2015)

Light for the Lost Boy is a 2012 album by the American contemporary Christian music singer and songwriter Andrew Peterson, released on Centricity Music.

== Background ==
Peterson worked with Cason Cooley and Ben Shive, in the production of this album. Centricity Music released the album on August 28, 2012.

== Critical reception ==
Professional ratings
Review scores
Source	Rating
CCM Magazine	4/5 stars
Christianity Today	4/5 stars
Cross Rhythms	10/10 squares
Indie Vision Music	4/5 stars
Jesus Freak Hideout	5/5 stars 4.5/5 stars
Louder Than the Music	4/5 stars
New Release Today	5/5 stars
The Phantom Tollbooth	4.5/5
Worship Leader	5/5 stars

Awarding the album four stars at CCM Magazine, Matt Conner states, "Light for the Lost Boy is sure throw long-time fans for an artistic loop." Jeremy V. Jones, giving the album four stars for Christianity Today, writes, "What's new is the brilliant edge to Light for the Lost Boy". Rating the album five stars from Worship Leader, Andrea Hunter says, "His use of space and arrangement to evoke myriad moods shines on Light for the Lost Boy's mostly acoustic, gentle yet dramatic folk/rock." Andy Cooper, indicating in a perfect ten review by Cross Rhythms, describes, "Poetry and aural art, masterfully mixed."

Signaling in a five star review at New Release Today, Dawn Teresa replies, "The songwriting is superb...Lyrically deep, you'll discover nuances and meaning with each listen." Jen Rose, specifying in a five star review for Jesus Freak Hideout, recognizes, "As a lament to lost innocence and a celebration of new creation, Light for the Lost Boy is one of the year's best and bravest records yet." Giving the album a four and a half from The Phantom Tollbooth, Michael Dalton responds, "Light for the Lost Boy by Andrew Peterson is his boldest, most imaginative work."

Timothy Estabrooks, awarding the album four and a half stars at Jesus Freak Hideout, recognizes, "Andrew Peterson for making another beautiful album and continuing to be a bright light in the world of Christian music". Rating the album four stars for Indie Vision Music, Jonathan Andre describes, "with Light for the Lost Boy as the motivational spark to remember God's extension of His grace and my freedom in just resting in His presence!" Jono Davies, assigning a four star rating by Louder Than the Music, calls, Light for the Lost Boy a "heartfelt album".

== Track listing ==
All tracks are written by Andrew Peterson, unless otherwise noted.

No.	Title	Writer(s)	Length
1.	"Come Back Soon"		5:36
2.	"The Cornerstone"		4:44
3.	"Rest Easy"	Andrew Peterson; Tyler Cook	3:27
4.	"The Voice of Jesus"		3:26
5.	"The Ballad of Jody Baxter"	Andrew Peterson, Marjorie Kinnan Rawlings	4:01
6.	"Day by Day"		4:00
7.	"Shine Your Light on Me"	Andrew Peterson; Andy Gullahorn; Ben Shive	4:46
8.	"Carry the Fire"	Andrew Peterson, Ben Shive	4:26
9.	"You'll Find Your Way"		4:30
10.	"Don't You Want to Thank Someone"		9:56
Total length:			48:52

Disc 2: The Lost Boy Demos (An acoustic version of the entire album)
No.	Title	Writer(s)	Length
1.	"Come Back Soon"		4:59
2.	"The Cornerstone"		4:08
3.	"Rest Easy"	Andrew Peterson; Tyler Cook	3:28
4.	"The Voice of Jesus"		2:52
5.	"The Ballad of Jody Baxter"	Andrew Peterson, Marjorie Kinnan Rawlings	4:04
6.	"Day by Day"		4:02
7.	"Shine Your Light on Me"	Andrew Peterson; Andy Gullahorn; Ben Shive	4:39
8.	"Carry the Fire"	Andrew Peterson, Ben Shive	4:05
9.	"You'll Find Your Way"		4:29
10.	"Don't You Want to Thank Someone"		7:55
Total length:			44:41

== Personnel ==
- Andrew Peterson – lead vocals, acoustic guitars
- Cason Cooley – acoustic piano, keyboards, electric guitars, Omnichord, bass, percussion, marimba, tambourine, backing vocals, string arrangements
- Ben Shive – acoustic piano, keyboards, synthesizers, Hammond B3 organ, pump organ, synth bass, acoustic guitars, electric guitars, hammered dulcimer, backing vocals, string arrangements
- Tyler Burkum – electric guitars, lap steel guitar
- Andy Gullahorn – acoustic guitars, electric guitars, classical guitar, bouzouki, backing vocals
- Andrew Osenga – electric guitars
- Matt Pierson – bass
- Will Chapman – drums, percussion
- Will Sayles – drums
- Claire Indie – cello
- Eleanore Denig – cello, violin
- Zach Casebolt – violin
- Eric Peters – backing vocals
- Jill Phillips – backing vocals
- Max Corwin – backing vocals
- Skye Peterson – backing vocals
- Nathan Tasker – backing vocals

=== Production ===
- Cason Cooley – producer
- Ben Shive – producer
- Buckley Miller – engineer
- Vance Powell – mixing (1, 2, 7)
- Shane D. Wilson – mixing (3–6, 8–10)
- Justin Dowse – mix assistant (3–6, 8–10)
- Lani Crump – mix coordinator (3–6, 8–10)
- Bob Boyd – mastering at Ambient Digital (Houston, Texas)
- Max Corwin – production assistant
- Laura Dart – photography
- Katie Moore – design
- Gerald Manley Hopkins – liner notes

Acoustic Demos

- Ben Shive – engineer
- James Childs – engineer, mixing
- Mike Odmark – mastering

== Chart performance ==
In 2013, the album charted on Sverigetopplistan, the official Swedish albums chart.

Chart (2012–2013)	Peak position
Swedish Albums Chart	54
US Billboard 200	125
US Top Christian Albums (Billboard)	8
