= Glenn Rosenstein =

Glenn Rosenstein is an American record producer, engineer, sound mixer and guitarist based in Muscle Shoals, Alabama, who engineered and produced many albums including the Grammy-winning One Bright Day by Ziggy Marley. Rosenstein worked at Sigma Sound Studios in New York City in the 1980s. He owns and runs Skylight Studio.

== Biography ==
Rosenstein started as a guitarist but, having "quickly learned in a very competitive NYC market that [he] was average at best", moved to music production, his first job being a part-time receptionist at The Power Station. As a producer, mixer, and engineer, his projects have won three Grammy Awards, garnered five Grammy nominations and won both an Oscar and a Golden Globe award.

== Selected discography ==
=== Producer ===
- Last Alaska Moon by Livingston Taylor released by Coconut Bay, a division of Chesky Records, in 2010
- There You Are Again by American singer-songwriter Livingston Taylor released by Whistling Dog Music in January 2006
- Between the Dreaming and the Coming True by contemporary Christian musician, Bebo Norman on Essential Records released on September 19, 2006
- Clear to Venus by American singer-songwriter Andrew Peterson, released in 2001
- The Best of Plumb by Christian singer Plumb which features 15 previously released songs, including three remixes, 2000
- Carried Along by American singer-songwriter Andrew Peterson, released in 2000
- I Bificus by singer/songwriter Bif Naked, released in 1998
- 40 Acres, the 1999 release from Caedmon's Call
- candycoatedwaterdrops by Christian singer Plumb released in 1999
- Wake by Emmet Swimming released twice; first as an independent releaseand later as an Epic Records release. The 1994 Screaming Goddess Music release differs from the Epic Records re-release of wake.
- Jahmekya by Ziggy Marley and the Melody Makers, 1991

=== Engineer ===
- Conscious Party by Ziggy Marley & The Melody Makers', released in 1988
- Spanish Fly, 1987 album by Lisa Lisa and Cult Jam, best known for the singles "Head to Toe" and "Lost in Emotion," both of which reached number one in the United States. The album was a commercial success, reaching No. 7 on the Billboard 200 and going Platinum.

=== Musician ===
- Boom Boom Chi Boom Boom by Tom Tom Club released in 1988, rhythm guitar on "Born for Love", keyboards on "She Belongs to Me"
