= The Wingfeather Saga =

Novel series by Andrew Peterson

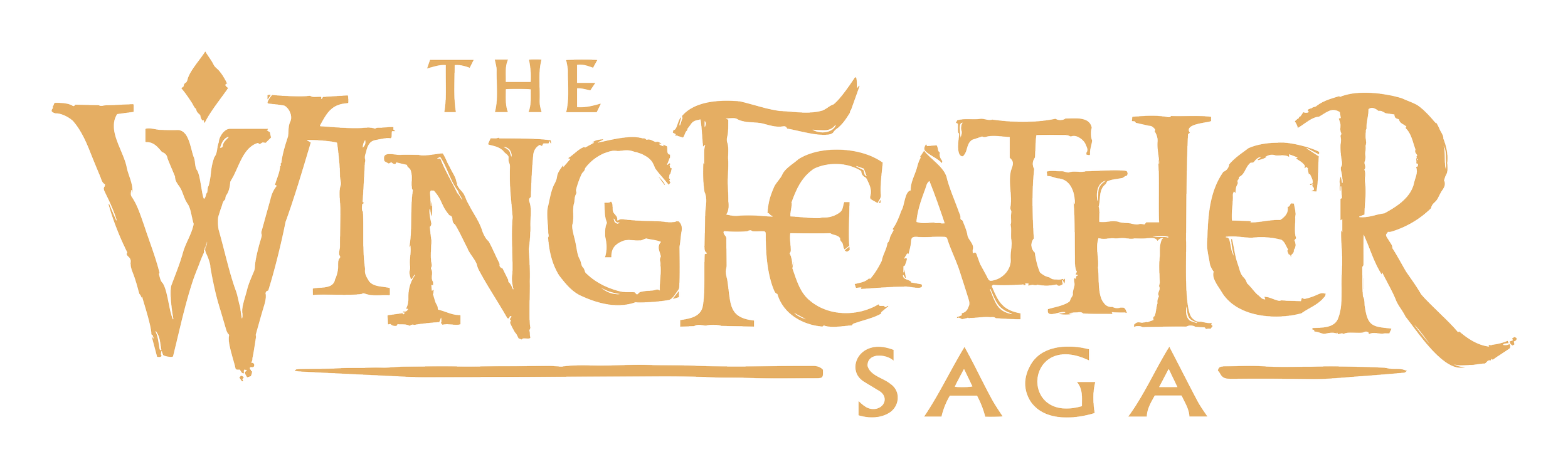
- (The first four listed below are the main books of the series, the rest are add-ons or extras): (2008) On the Edge of the Dark Sea of Darkness; (2009) North! Or Be Eaten; (2011) The Monster in the Hollows; (2014) The Warden and the Wolf King; (2014) Pembrick's Creaturepedia; (2016) Wingfeather Tales; (2023) The Art of The Wingfeather Saga - Season One; (2023) A Ranger's Guide to Glipwood Forest; (2024) The Prince of Yorsha Doon
- Author: Andrew Peterson
- Illustrator: Joe Sutphin
- Cover artist: Nicholas Kole
- Language: English
- Discipline: Fantasy, young adult fiction, children's fiction
- Publisher: Rabbit Room Press; Waterbrook
- No. of books: 9
- Website: https://www.wingfeathersaga.com

The Wingfeather Saga is a series of nine children’s epic fantasy novels written by singer-songwriter Andrew Peterson. It is being adapted into a seven-season animated television series by Angel Studios, with Peterson as an executive producer along with J. Chris Wall. Production of the show has been funded by equity crowdfunding. The first season aired from December 2, 2022 to March 10, 2023. The second season aired from April 5, 2024 to May 17, 2024. The third season started airing on November 12, 2025. The series proper consists of On the Edge of the Dark Sea of Darkness, North! Or Be Eaten, The Monster in the Hollows, and The Warden and the Wolf King.

== Premise ==
The series relates the adventurous Igiby/Wingfeather family, made up of grandfather Podo, mother Nia, and three children, Janner, Kalmar "Tink" and Leeli. They discover secrets of their family history, then run into the evil Fangs of Dang who are occupying the country of Skree where the Wingfeathers were raised. They combat Gnag the Nameless, the master of the Fangs. The story takes place in the fantasy world of Aerwiar, which has not developed electricity or firearms and which has a number of strange creatures.

== Related books ==
The series has a number of related books.

- Pembrick's Creaturepedia (2014), a guide to the creatures of Skree, written by Andrew Peterson and illustrated by Aedan Peterson.
- Wingfeather Tales (2016), an anthology written by various authors and edited by Andrew Peterson.
- A Ranger's Guide to Glipwood Forest (2023), a field guide written by Andrew Peterson and illustrated by Aedan Peterson.
- The Art of The Wingfeather Saga - Season One (2023), an artist's book compiled by art director Garret Taylor, with a foreword by Andrew Peterson and an introduction by J. Chris Wall.
- The Prince of Yorsha Doon (2024), an abridged children's book based on the first short story from Wingfeather Tales, written by Andrew Peterson and illustrated by Kristina Kister.

== Main characters ==
- Janner Igiby (Wingfeather) The oldest brother, he helps around the farm and bookstore and has dreams of sailing. As oldest, the ancient role of Throne Warden (protector of the king) is his, which places much pressure on his shoulders.
- Kalmar (Tink) Igiby (Wingfeather) Tink (birth name Kalmar) is second born brother, heir to the throne by the Annieran tradition that the second child inherits the crown.
- Leeli Igiby (Wingfeather) Youngest and only sister. She is musically talented, and crippled, but brave and adept with her crutches. She is gifted a Whistleharp that belonged to her great-grandmother, Madia, Queen of Anniera.
- Nia Igiby (Wingfeather) The regal mother to Janner, Tink and Leeli, and Queen of the Shining Isle of Anniera. After the Fangs took control, she hid herself and her children by returning to the town her father grew up in, and taking her mother's maiden name, Igiby.
- Podo Helmer Nia's father, and grandfather to Janner, Tink and Leeli. He has a rough love for his grandsons but a soft spot for his granddaughter. He tends the garden, protects the family, and tells stories of his former wild life as a pirate at sea. A dragon bit off his leg and he replaced it with a peg leg.
- Esben Wingfeather Janner, Kalmar and Leeli's father, High King of the Shining Isle of Anniera. Assumed dead after the invasion of Anniera, later found to have been captured and imprisoned by Gnag.
- Artham Wingfeather (Peet the Sock Man) Esben Wingfeather's older brother and the Throne Warden mad at the start of the saga. The socks that concealed his hands magically transform into talons.
- Oskar Noss Reteep An old, wise, bookseller and gentle soul. A self-proclaimed "appreciator of the neat, strange and/or yummy". He lived in his bookstore before traveling with the Igiby family and eventually settling down in the Green Hollows.
- Sara Cobbler A friend of Janner who was enslaved by the Fangs. She helps when Janner is taken and leads a mass exodus of slaves.
- Gammon Felda (The Florid Sword) The leader of the rebellion against the Fangs and the hero of Dugtown. Adoptive father of Maraly Weaver.
- Maraly Weaver (Shadow Blade) A member of the vagabond outlaw Stranders. She helped Artham Wingfeather and Gammon Felda and was adopted by the latter after her father died.

== Animated series ==
The Wingfeather Saga
- Genre: Epic fantasy; Action-adventure; Animated series
- Created by: J. Chris Wall
- Based on: The Wingfeather Saga by Andrew Peterson
- Starring: Jodi Benson; Kevin McNally; Kari Wahlgren; Henry Ian Cusick; Alkaio Thiele; Griffin Faulkner; Henry Witcher; Romy Fay; Andrew Peterson
- Composers: Benjamin Botkin; Ben Shive; Kurt Heinecke; The Arcadian Wild
- Country of origin: United States
- Original language: English
- No. of seasons: 3
- No. of episodes: 19

Production
- Executive producers: J. Chris Wall; Andrew Peterson; Keith Lango; Brock Starnes; Jason Melton
- Animator: Keith Lango
- Running time: 26–35 minutes
- Production companies: Angel Studios; Toothy Cow Productions
- Budget: $11.5 million (to date)

Original release
- Network: Angel Studios
- Release: December 2, 2022 – present

In March 2016 a Kickstarter was successfully funded to produce a pilot episode for a 7-season animated series adaptation. That campaign also funded a series of short stories set in the world of Aerwiar. The stories were written by Andrew Peterson, Jennifer Trafton, N. D. Wilson, A. S. Peterson, Jonathan Rogers, and Douglas Kaine McKelvey. They were illustrated by Cory Godbey, Nicholas Kole, John Hendrix, Joe Sutphin, Doug TenNapel, Justin Gerard, and Aedan Peterson; and the musical score was composed by The Arcadian Wild and Kurt Heinecke.

The fifteen-minute short film, titled A Crow for the Carriage, premiered on November 2, 2017, at Belcourt Theatre in Nashville, Tennessee. The short is available for streaming on multiple platforms. The series' producer, J. Chris Wall, and author, Andrew Peterson, then tried to pitch the show to film and television outlets.

The show went through another round of crowdfunding with investment platform Angel Studios in May 2021. The campaign met its goal, raising $5 million to fund the production of Season 1, which covered and adapted the events of the first book. The first episode, Leeli and the Dragon Song (later renamed Leeli and the Sea Dragon Song), released on December 2 on the Angel Studios app, YouTube, and Facebook. The second and third rounds of crowdfunding for Season 2 began soon after, with a goal of $6.5 million. Production began in 2023 on Season 2, which covers the first half of Book 2. Season 2 was released on April 5, 2024.

=== Cast ===
- Alkaio Thiele as Janner Igiby (Wingfeather)
- Griffin Robert Faulkner (Season 1–2) and Henry Witcher (Season 3–present) as Kalmar "Tink" Igiby (Wingfeather)
- Romy Fay as Leeli Igiby (Wingfeather)
- Jodi Benson as Nia Igiby (Wingfeather)
- Kevin McNally as Podo Helmer
- Andrew Peterson as Oskar Noss Reteep
- Henry Ian Cusick as Artham "Peet" Wingfeather
- Ari Elizabeth Johnson as Sara Cobbler (Season 1-3)
- Enn Reitel as Zouzab, Buzzard Willie, Shaggy
- Kellen Goff as Slarb, Brak, Yurgen, General Khrak
- Kari Wahlgren as the Stonekeeper, Hulwen, Freva Longhunter
- Christopher Robin Miller as Commander Gnorm, Vop, Mobrik, Timber (Season 2)
- Adam Sietz as Mayor Blaggus, Critch, Migg Landers
- Ellie Holcomb as Ferinia (Season 1, 3)
- Dave Mullins as Armulyn the Bard (Season 1)
- Eva Whittaker as Maraly Weaver (Season 2–present)
- Lesley Nicol as Nurgabog (Season 2)
- Will de Renzy-Martin as Claxton Weaver (Season 2)
- Billy Boyd as the Overseer (Season 2–3)
- Ezra Knight as Ronchy McHiggins (Season 2)
- Matthew Rhys as Gammon/The Florid Sword (Season 2–3, 5)
- David Oyelowo as Timber (Season 3-4)
- Jim Broadbent as Bonifer Squoon (Season 4)
- Dan Stevens as Esben Wingfeather (Season 4)
- Nadia Quinn as Madame Sidler (Season 4)
- Sam Clark as Rudric (Season 4)
- Noah Rafferty as Grigory Bunge (Season 4)
- Lin Gallagher as Olumphia Groundwich (Season 4)

=== Episodes ===
==== Season 1 (2022–23) ====
No. overall	No. in season	Title	Directed by	Written by	Original release date
1	1	"Leeli and the Sea Dragon Song"	Bill Breneisen	Jacob Roman and Kenny Ryan	December 2, 2022
2	2	"A Mysterious Map"	John Sanford	Jacob Roman and Kenny Ryan	December 16, 2022
3	3	"The Catacombs Below"	John Sanford	Douglas Kaine McKelvey	December 30, 2022
4	4	"Escape to Peet's Castle"	John Sanford	Lauren Gauthier	February 10, 2023
5	5	"Fruit for Zouzab"	John Sanford	Lauren Gauthier	February 24, 2023
6	6	"The Jewels of Anniera"	John Sanford	Jacob Roman and Kenny Ryan	March 10, 2023

==== Season 2 (2024) ====
No. overall	No. in season	Title	Directed by	Written by	Original release date
7	1	"Flight of the Wingfeathers"	John Sanford	Lauren Gauthier	April 5, 2024
8	2	"Fingap Falls"	John Sanford	Douglas Kaine McKelvey	April 12, 2024
9	3	"Stranded"	John Sanford	Cory Edwards	April 19, 2024
10	4	"The Roundish Widow"	John Sanford	Cory Edwards	April 26, 2024
11	5	"The Sundering"	John Sanford	Douglas Kaine McKelvey	May 3, 2024
12	6	"The Fork! Factory!"	John Sanford	Lauren Gauthier and Douglas Kaine McKelvey	May 10, 2024
13	7	"Escape to the North"	John Sanford	Douglas Kaine McKelvey	May 17, 2024

==== Season 3 (2025) ====
No. overall	No. in season	Title	Directed by	Written by	Original release date
14	1	"The Bomnubble's Cave"	Daniel Haycox and John Sanford	Kenny Ryan, Jacob Feyereisen, and Douglas Kaine McKelvey	November 12, 2025
15	2	"Snickbuzzards and Snow Boggans"	Daniel Haycox and John Sanford	Cory Edwards, Kenny Ryan, Jacob Feyereisen, Douglas Kaine McKelvey, and Lauren Gauthier	November 12, 2025
16	3	"The Transformation"	Daniel Haycox	Douglas Kaine McKelvey and Lauren Gauthier	November 19, 2025
17	4	"The Battle of Kimera"	Keith Lango	Kenny Ryan, Jacob Feyereisen, and Douglas Kaine McKelvey	November 26, 2025
18	5	"The Sins of Scale Raker"	Ron Smith	Douglas Kaine McKelvey (additional writing by A.S. Peterson)	December 3, 2025
19	6	"The Wolf's True Name"	John Wall	Jacob Feyereisen and Kenny Ryan	December 10, 2025

==== Season 4 (2026) ====
No. overall	No. in season	Title	Directed by	Written by	Original release date
20	1	TBA	TBA	TBA	October 21, 2026
21	2	TBA	TBA	TBA	October 28, 2026
22	3	TBA	TBA	TBA	November 4, 2026
23	4	TBA	TBA	TBA	November 11, 2026
24	5	TBA	TBA	TBA	November 18, 2026
25	6	TBA	TBA	TBA	November 25, 2026
26	7	TBA	TBA	TBA	December 2, 2026

=== Future seasons ===
Season 5 has a projected release date of 2027, and will cover the first third of Book 4. Season 6 has a projected release date of 2028, and will cover the middle third of Book 4. Season 7 has a projected release date of 2029, and will cover the final third of Book 4. Altogether, a total of 52 episodes are planned for the series.
