= Songs One Through Six =

EP by Chris Mason
- Released: 2006
- Recorded: The Velvet Eagle, Nashville, Tennessee
- Genre: Singer-songwriter
- Length: 25:01
- Label: Independent
- Producers: Andrew Osenga; Cason Cooley

Chris Mason chronology
Crowded Spaces (2003)	Songs One Through Six (2006)

Professional ratings
Review scores
Source	Rating
Jesus Freak Hideout	
The Phantom Tollbooth	

Songs One Through Six (2006) is the third release from Chris Mason, following two previous full-length studio albums. It was recorded at the Velvet Eagle, in Nashville, Tennessee, and mastered at Final Stage Mastering, by Al Willis. The artwork and design was done by Jordan Brooke Hamlin.

== Track listing ==
All songs written by Chris Mason.

1. "Waiting" – 3:50
2. "Slow Me Down" – 4:28
3. "Second Chance" – 3:37
4. "Down Here" – 4:12
5. "Reaching Out" – 4:09
6. "Precious Lord Thy Mercy Come" – 4:45

== Personnel ==
- Chris Mason – vocals, acoustic guitar, harmonica, electric guitar
- Andrew Osenga – electric guitar, piano, bass guitar, mandolin guitar, baritone, background vocals
- Cason Cooley – keyboard, mandolin guitar, Rhodes piano, electric guitar, bass guitar, percussion, piano, counter
- Paul Eckberg – drums
