= Love and Thunder (album) =

Studio album by Andrew Peterson
- Released: February 25, 2003
- Studios: Sound Kitchen and Neverland (Franklin, Tennessee): Little Big Sound (Nashville, Tennessee)
- Genres: Christian pop; Christian rock; folk rock; country; bluegrass; blues
- Length: 41:16
- Label: Essential
- Producer: Steve Hindalong: Derri Daugherty

Andrew Peterson chronology
Clear to Venus (2001)	Love and Thunder (2003)	Behold the Lamb of God (2004)

Love and Thunder is the fourth album by the American singer-songwriter Andrew Peterson, released in 2003.

== Background ==
Peterson worked with Steve Hindalong, Derri Daugherty, in the production of this album. Essential Records released the album on February 25, 2003.

== Musical style ==
Reviewing the album for CCM Magazine, Andy Argyrakis recognizes, "Since his debut in 2000, Andrew Peterson has become a treasured singer/songwriter whose textured folk stylings and delicate acoustics allow his storybook lyrics to come alive...Throughout such cuts and the six others, you’ll find a supplementary smattering of placid acoustics, frolicking folk, bits of banjo-driven bluegrass and even some subtle strings, furthering the classic mood you’ve come to expect from this troubadour."

== Critical reception ==
Professional ratings
Review scores
Source	Rating
AllMusic	3/5 stars
Christianity Today	4.5/5 stars
Cross Rhythms	9/10 squares
The Phantom Tollbooth	3/5; 4/5

Awarding the album four and a half stars at Christianity Today, Russ Breimeier writes, "Give Love & Thunder your undivided attention for a truly rewarding Christian music experience." Tony Cummings, rating the album a nine out of ten for Cross Rhythms, says, " Pop radio it isn’t but magnificent it is." Giving the album a four out of five from The Phantom Tollbooth, Brian A. Smith states, "This album is superior to Peterson's previous works and shows a developing maturity as a writer."

Ashleigh Kittle, indicating in a three star review by AllMusic, replies, "The album continues in Peterson's acoustic folk style, resembling both the work and the melancholy feel of Rich Mullins and Fernando Ortega." Signaling in a three out of five review at The Phantom Tollbooth, Matt Kilgore responds, "Peterson proves at several point in Love and Thunder that he still has some of the amazing songwriting ability which he has always had, but not as great as we have seen it."

== Track listing ==
All tracks are written by Andrew Peterson unless otherwise noted.

No.	Title	Writer(s)	Length
1.	"Canaan Bound"	Peterson, Ben Shive	3:27
2.	"Let There Be Light"	Peterson, Shive	3:56
3.	"Serve Hymn/Holy Is the Lord"	Peterson, Shive	4:12
4.	"Pillar of Fire"		4:40
5.	"Just As I Am"		3:44
6.	"Family Man"		4:01
7.	"Tools"		3:47
8.	"High Noon"		4:25
9.	"The Silence of God"		3:49
10.	"After the Last Tear Falls"	Andrew Osenga, Peterson	5:15
Total length:			41:16

== Personnel ==
- Andrew Peterson – lead vocals, backing vocals, acoustic guitar, hi-string acoustic guitar (3), bouzouki (10)
- Ben Shive – acoustic piano (1, 3, 5, 6, 8–10), string orchestration (1, 3, 5, 6, 8–10), accordion (2, 7), Rhodes electric piano (4), keyboards (10)
- Ron Block – acoustic guitar (2, 5, 6), banjo (3)
- Stuart Duncan – mandolin (2, 3), fiddle (2, 3, 8)
- Derri Daugherty – electric guitars (4, 5, 8, 10), backing vocals (4, 10)
- Phil Madeira – lap steel guitar (4, 9)
- Andrew Osenga – mando-guitar (10), backing vocals (10)
- Chris Donohue – bass, double bass (2–5, 8–10)
- Ken Lewis – drums (1–5, 8–9), percussion (1–5, 8–9)
- Steve Hindalong – percussion (2–5, 8, 10)
- Gabe Scott – hammered dulcimer (8)
- Anthony LaMarchina – cello (1, 3, 5, 8)
- David Davidson – violin (1, 3, 5, 8)
- Alison Krauss – backing vocals (1)
- Jill Phillips – backing vocals (2, 3, 5, 8, 9)
- Matthew Perryman Jones – backing vocals (3)
- Randall Goodgame – backing vocals (4, 7)
- Cliff Young – backing vocals (5)
- Jamie Peterson – backing vocals (6)

=== Production ===
- Bob Wohler – executive producer
- Steve Hindalong – producer
- Derri Daughtery – producer, recording
- Gary Paczosa – mixing at The Doghouse (Nashville, Tennessee)
- Richard Dodd – mastering
