= The Burning Edge of Dawn =

Studio album by Andrew Peterson
- Released: October 9, 2015
- Genres: Contemporary Christian music, folk rock
- Length: 38:08
- Label: Centricity
- Producers: Gabe Scott: Ben Shive; Joe Causey

Andrew Peterson chronology
Light for the Lost Boy (2012)	The Burning Edge of Dawn (2015)	Resurrection Letters: Volume 1 (2018)

The Burning Edge of Dawn is the eleventh studio album by Andrew Peterson. Centricity Music released the album on October 9, 2015. Peterson worked with Gabe Scott, in the production of this album.

== Critical reception ==
Professional ratings
Review scores
Source	Rating
365 Days of Inspiring Media	4.5/5 stars
CCM Magazine	4/5 stars
The Christian Beat	4.5/5 stars
Cross Rhythms	10/10 squares
Jesus Freak Hideout	4.5/5 stars 4/5 stars
Louder Than the Music	4/5 stars
New Release Today	4.5/5 stars
The Phantom Tollbooth	4.5/5; 4.5/5
Worship Leader	4.5/5 stars

Awarding the album four stars from CCM Magazine, Matt Conner describes, "It's often plaintive, yet always vulnerable, and fits comfortably alongside much earlier albums in Peterson's discography." Mary Nikkel, indicating in a four and a half star review by New Release Today, replies, "The Burning Edge of Dawn holds easily the strongest, most grace-drenched songwriting you will hear this year." Signaling in a four and a half star review at Jesus Freak Hideout, Mark Rice recognizes, "[listeners] are in for a real treat." Graham Gladstone, rating the album four and a half stars from Worship Leader, writes, "The Burning Edge of Dawn is a solid release, aching with authenticity, and is poised not just to please musical ears but to encourage the souls of those who seek God in a world with no easy answers."

Mentioning in a ten out of ten review at Cross Rhythms, Lins Honeyman describes, "Undeniably introspective in nature, Peterson succeeds in grabbing the heart of the listener with beautifully poetic but candidly aching lyrics that portray certain life struggles whilst weaving in the love of Christ to offer up hope and help instead of self-pity." Ryan Barbee, specifying in a four star review from Jesus Freak Hideout, responds, "the album took some time to fully process, but once it reached a point of understanding, it made a solid landing." Rating the album a four and a half out of five for The Phantom Tollbooth, Justin Carlton states, "it is supremely up-lifting." Michael Dalton, indicating in a four and a half out of five review from The Phantom Tollbooth, says, "he has never sounded better."

Jono Davies, giving the album four stars at Louder Than the Music, writes, "You wouldn't expect any other songwriter to write these songs, these are Andrew's songs and they are mighty fine tracks." Allocating a four and a half star review for the album by The Christian Beat, Sarah Baylor regards, "Each song is so unique and Peterson shares such beautiful stories through his masterfully crafted lyrics." Kenneth Wiegman, reviewing the album from Alpha Omega News, says, "The best part about this project is that while the lyrics are profound, they are not cryptic." Assigning the album four and a half stars at 366 Days of Inspiring Media, Jonathan Andre writes, "Andrew’s follow-up to his greatest hits project is nothing less of magnificent."

== Track listing ==
No.	Title	Writer(s)	Length
1.	"The Dark Before the Dawn"	Andrew Peterson	4:09
2.	"Every Star Is a Burning Flame"	Peterson	2:47
3.	"We Will Survive"	Peterson	4:04
4.	"My One Safe Place"	Peterson, Gabe Scott	3:31
5.	"The Rain Keeps Falling" (with Ellie Holcomb)	Peterson	5:08
6.	"Rejoice"	Peterson, Scott	3:43
7.	"I Want to Say I'm Sorry"	Peterson	3:07
8.	"Be Kind to Yourself"	Peterson, Scott	2:44
9.	"The Power of a Great Affection"	Peterson, Scott	4:09
10.	"The Sower's Song"	Peterson, Ben Shive	4:46
Total length:			38:08

== Chart performance ==
Chart (2015)	Peak position
US Billboard 200	97
US Top Christian Albums (Billboard)	3
