= Arlington to Boston =

Studio album by Emmet Swimming
- Released: 1996
- Recorded: Reflection Sound, Charlotte, NC
- Genre: Rock, alternative rock
- Length: 48:18
- Label: Epic Records
- Producer: Don Dixon

Emmet Swimming chronology
wake (1994)	Arlington to Boston (1996)	Big Night Without You (1998)

Professional ratings
Review scores
Source	Rating
Allmusic	2/5 stars

Arlington to Boston is the third album released from the band emmet swimming. It was the release that first garnered national attention for them.

== Track listing ==
All lyrics are written by Todd Watts; all music is composed by emmet swimming.

No.	Title	Length
1.	"Arlington"	2:39
2.	"Living Room"	3:17
3.	"Fake Wood Trim"	3:12
4.	"Long Way Down"	4:43
5.	"Bullet in Your Hand"	5:16
6.	"1201 Central Avenue"	0:11
7.	"8:45"	4:14
8.	"Big Houses"	3:44
9.	"Parking Lot"	3:48
10.	"Wake"	4:24
11.	"Birdman of Columbia"	4:17
12.	"17 Hours"	2:45
13.	"Sellout"	2:19
14.	"Boston"	3:43

== Awards ==
Year	Ceremony	Award	Result
1996	Washington Area Music Awards	Alternative Rock Recording	Won
1996	Washington Area Music Awards	Song of the Year: Arlington	Won

== Personnel ==
- Todd Watts - Vocals, Guitar
- Erik Wenberg - Guitar, backing vocals
- Luke Michel - Bass
- Tamer Eid - Drums
- Don Dixon - Producer
- Don Dixon and Mark Williams - Engineer
