= Love and Thunder =

Love and Thunder may refer to:

- Love and Thunder (album), a 2003 album by American singer-songwriter Andrew Peterson
- Thor: Love and Thunder, a 2022 American film produced by Marvel Studios
  - Thor: Love and Thunder (soundtrack), the film score album of the above film
