= Big Night Without You =

Studio album by Emmet Swimming
- Released: 1998
- Studio: Ocean Way, Nashville
- Genre: Rock, alternative rock
- Length: 44:16
- Label: Epic Records
- Producer: Peter Collins

Emmet Swimming chronology
Arlington to Boston (1996)	Big Night Without You (1998)	Earplugs 50¢ (1999)

Professional ratings
Review scores
Source	Rating
Allmusic	2.5/5 stars

Big Night Without You is the fourth album released from the band emmet swimming. It combined elements of gospel, alternative rock, dark humor, wailing, and churning rock guitars.

== Track listing ==
All lyrics are written by Todd Watts; all music is composed by emmet swimming.

No.	Title	Length
1.	"Guru"	4:00
2.	"Fist Like a Glove"	3:54
3.	"Arlington (Reprise)"	0:26
4.	"Turnstile"	3:34
5.	"Tom Collins"	3:26
6.	"Off Key Choir"	3:18
7.	"Motorway"	4:43
8.	"Stealing From the Joneses"	3:40
9.	"No Way to Say Goodbye"	3:38
10.	"Sarah When the Wind Blows"	3:39
11.	"Trains Slows Down"	3:20
12.	"Sunblock"	6:38

== Personnel ==
- Todd Watts - Vocals, Guitar
- Erik Wenberg - Guitar, backing vocals
- Luke Michel - Bass
- Tamer Eid - Drums
- Peter Collins - Producer
- Paul David Hager - Engineer
