= K-Love =

Contemporary Christian music radio network in the United States

K-LOVE
- Type: Radio network
- Country: United States

Ownership
- Owner: Educational Media Foundation
- Sister stations: Air1; Radio Nueva Vida

History
- Launch date: October 15, 1982 (43 years ago)

Coverage
- Availability: National, through broadcast stations and translators Worldwide on select stations via TuneIn
- Stations: See List of K-Love stations

Links
- Webcast: Listen live; Listen live (via iHeartRadio)
- Website: www.klove.com

K-Love (stylized as K-LOVE) is an American Christian radio network. Owned by the Educational Media Foundation (EMF), a non-profit Christian ministry, it primarily broadcasts contemporary Christian music.

As of June 2019, the network's programming is aired over 520 FM stations and translators in 48 U.S. states, American Samoa, Puerto Rico, and the District of Columbia. As of 2018, K-Love and its sister network Air1 reportedly had a weekly cumulative audience of about 20 million listeners.

== History ==
=== 1980s ===
In 1980, the Christian Life Center First Assembly of God of Santa Rosa, California, received a construction permit to operate a new noncommercial radio station in that city, KCLB on 91.9 MHz. The church, however, was being affected by a major scandal involving its trust fund, which had forced it into bankruptcy two years prior and had required the church to abandon its plans for the time being. Later in 1980, under new management, the church hoped to raise the funds to put the nearly fully equipped station on the air as a contemporary Christian music radio station.

In 1982, after several attempts to purchase a station in San Francisco, the Educational Media Foundation purchased KCLB for $65,760. Bob Anthony Fogel, a former DJ at KFRC, founded EMF, which in its early years was also known as Christian Media Ministries. Charles Colson assisted in fundraising efforts for KCLB in the San Francisco area. KCLB signed on October 15, 1982; the first song played on the station was "Praise the Lord" by the Imperials, which was a hit on the Christian music charts in 1979.

KCLB expanded in 1987 with new translators at San Rafael and Salinas.

On August 1, 1988, KCLB changed its call letters to KLVR and adopted its present K-LOVE moniker. A month and a half later, on September 12, its wooden transmitter building on Geyser Peak was burned to the ground by a brush fire believed to have been set by an arsonist. After the fire, the transmitter was relocated to 4,000-foot (1,200 m) Mount Saint Helena. The new location improved signal strength, and listeners reported they could now hear the station as far as 125 miles (201 km) away. By 1989, KLVR had expanded further to include translators covering Santa Cruz, San Jose, and Los Gatos.

=== 1990s ===
K-Love expanded its reach during the 1990s by purchasing small stations and translators, and repeating its signal. In 1992, K-LOVE began using satellite technology to expand to locations further away than just northern California. The Educational Media Foundation continued to purchase small translators in California but also bought stations in Portland, Oregon (KLVP), Phoenix, Arizona (KLVA), Oklahoma City (KYLV) and San Antonio (KZLV).

During the 1990s, K-Love also began to expand its on-air personalities. David Pierce joined in 1991 from KLTY in Dallas/Ft. Worth. Also Mike Novak, JD Chandler and Larry Wayne started working air shifts in the late 1990s. In addition to expanding the on-air talent, K-LOVE expanded its facilities and moved its headquarters from Santa Rosa to Sacramento in 1993. In 1998, K-Love increased its reach online by streaming live on klove.com.

=== 2000s ===
K-Love Logo used from 2004 until 2014.

During the decade of the 2000s, K-Love went through a period of expansion through the purchase of stations and translators across the United States. On October 5, 2000, Colorado Christian University sold KWBI Morrison / Denver, KJOL Grand Junction and KDRH Glenwood Springs, Colorado, as well as 18 translators to K-LOVE. The Colorado radio network was sold for a reported $16.6 million. A Colorado Christian University release said the board considered "many offers from Christian, as well as other suitors," but the priority was finding a buyer committed to "top-quality Christian programming."

In 2003, the EMF took advantage of a window of time where the Federal Communications Commission (FCC) allowed for the filing of new applications for FM translators, dubbed the "Great Translator Invasion". During that time, the FCC received over 13,000 applications for original construction permits on translators. The EMF filed over 800 applications, of which over 250 were approved, with most of those now carrying the K-Love network.

In January 2007, the EMF purchased 94.3 WJKL Elgin, Illinois, which broadcasts to the Chicago area, for $17 million. Shortly after the purchase, a flood hit the WJKL transmitter site that knocked the station off the air for more than a week. WJKL has since moved and now broadcasts from Oakbrook Terrace, Illinois, to the Chicago market. On November 30, 2007, K-LOVE purchased 97.3 KCXM, which was an ESPN radio affiliate for Kansas City, for $16 million. The call letters were changed to KLRX shortly after and now broadcasts from Lee's Summit to the Kansas City area. As a result, these and other station purchases, plus the new translators approved during the 2003 filing window, the K-Love radio network grew to be the largest broadcaster of contemporary Christian music in the world. By 2010, K-Love had an estimated listenership of 6 million people.

In 2002, the EMF moved its headquarters from Sacramento, California, to Rocklin. The new headquarters now housed K-Love, Air1 and Christian Music Planet magazine.

In 2001, Christian radio personality Jon Rivers, along with his wife Sherry, became the K-Love Morning Show hosts, and broadcast from their ranch in Texas. The show continued with Jon and Sherry for 7 years until March 28, 2009, when it was announced that they would step down due to family issues. Host Lisa Williams assumed the duties of hosting the program, and was later joined by Eric Allen. Other DJs also joined the team during this time such as Scott Smith and Kelli Caldwell, which eventually became the afternoon show. On October 1, 2008, Mike Novak was named president and CEO of the EMF, replacing Dick Jenkins, and as a result stopped having a regular on-air shift.

On July 15, 2009, the EMF bought 101.9 WKLU in Indianapolis, for $4.75 million, plus $1.55 million for the studio. The studio then became the broadcast location for the K-Love Morning Show.

=== 2010–present ===
Into the new decade, the EMF began to purchase more full-power stations in medium and larger markets. Since 2010, K-Love had begun broadcasting, or upgraded signals in Dayton, Ohio (WKCD formerly WCDR), Jacksonville, Florida (WCRJ), Knoxville, Tennessee (WYLV, formerly WDLF), Salt Lake City, Utah (KKAT), Stockton, California, San Francisco, California (KLVS), San Diego, California, Camden, New Jersey and Detroit, Michigan on WDKL 102.7 FM.

The EMF acquired WKLV-FM in Port Chester, New York, in 2010, and in May 2011 re-located its transmitter to the Trump Plaza in New Rochelle to cover New York City. In July 2012, the EMF swapped WLVM (formerly WABB Mobile, Alabama) with Cumulus Media, for Classic Hits WRQQ Nashville, Tennessee (a major hub for the Christian music community and where the majority of labels originate from). The EMF changed WRQQ's call sign to WLVU, which now broadcasts K-Love programming.

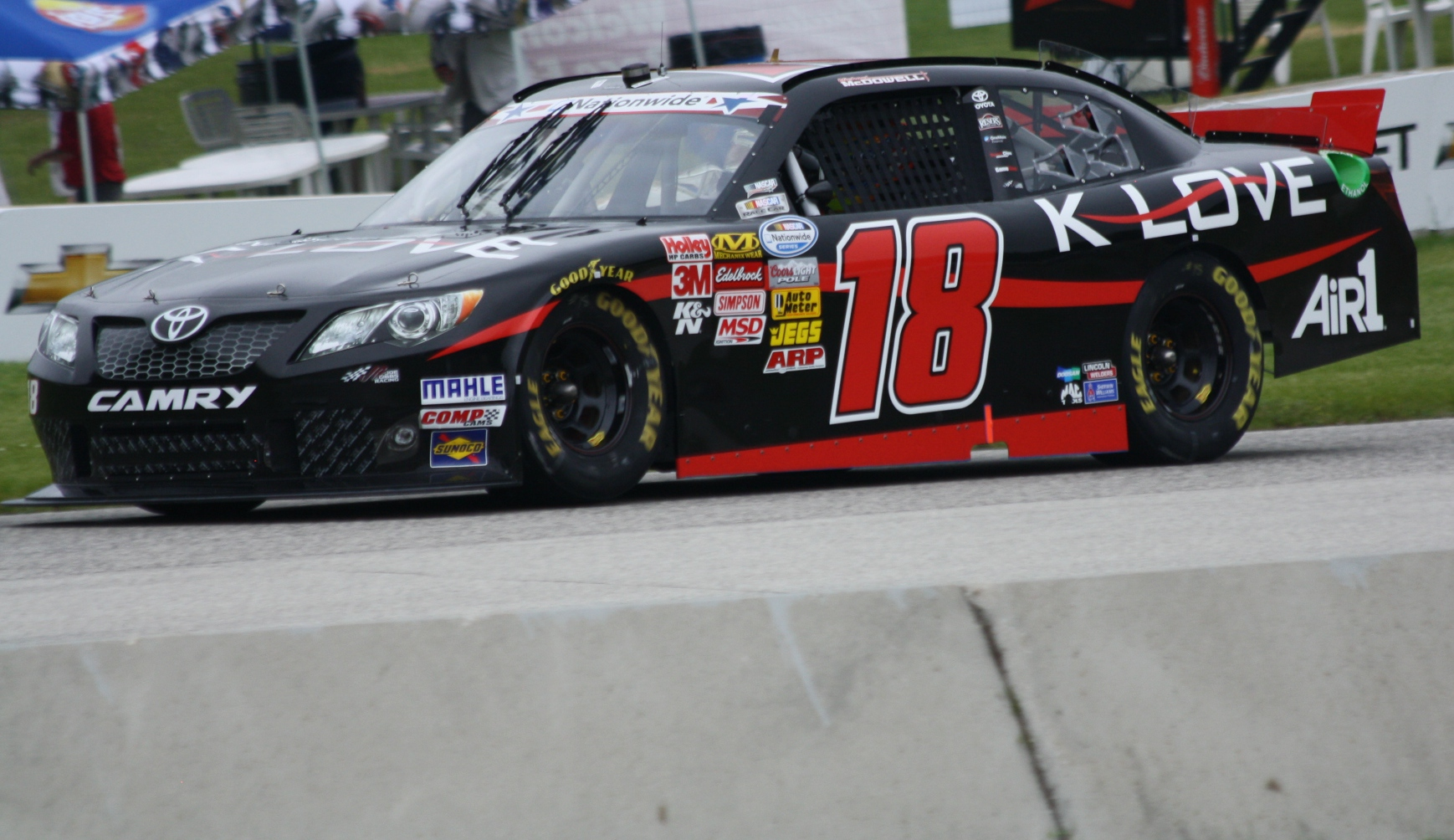
Michael McDowell's K-Love-sponsored Toyota Camry in the NASCAR Nationwide Series.

In July 2010, K-Love began sponsoring MacDonald Motorsports' #18 car and Michael McDowell in the NASCAR Nationwide Series. Then in March 2012, K-Love announced it would be the primary sponsor of Tony Pedregon's Funny Car for 12 of the final 20 races of the NHRA Full Throttle Drag Racing Series season. In February 2013, K-Love announced the inaugural K-LOVE Fan Awards, a listener-voted awards show for contemporary Christian musicians held in Nashville. The inaugural ceremony was held in June 2013, and hosted by Phil, Kay, Jasie, and Missy Robertson.

In July 2011, Amanda Carroll became the new mid-morning host and the network announced that Lisa Williams and Eric Allen would no longer be hosting the K-LOVE Morning Show. JD Chandler took their place until the K-LOVE Morning Show with Craig, Amy, and Kankelfritz acquired the spot in November 2011.

In December 2013, K-Love presented a Christmas music special for the cable network Up, K-Love Music City Christmas. The special was hosted by Candace Cameron Bure, and featured performances of Christmas-themed music by various contemporary Christian musicians.

In 2017, the EMF announced that it would acquire KSWD in Los Angeles, KSOQ-FM in San Diego County (licensed to Escondido), and WGGI in Scranton from CBS Radio and Entercom as part of their merger. The sale was approved on November 2, with KSWD flipping to K-Love as KKLQ; as Univision holds local trademark rights to the "K-Love" name in connection to its Spanish adult contemporary station KLVE (which has used the name since 1974), the station is marketed locally as "Positive, Encouraging 100.3" and "the K-Love for Christian music" to disambiguate it from KLVE.

In March 2018, the EMF acquired Chicago's WLUP from Merlin Media, after Cumulus Media ended a local marketing agreement with the station due to their bankruptcy. The station was taken over by the EMF under an LMA at midnight on March 10, 2018, and flipped to K-Love; the moment was preceded by several songs referencing Satan, culminating with AC/DC's "Highway to Hell"—a subtle jab at the new ownership suggested by veteran Chicago broadcaster and former WLUP personality Steve Dahl.

In August 2018, after soft-launching it as an online radio station, K-Love launched K-Love Classics—a new classic hits network with a focus on contemporary Christian music from the 80s, 90s, and early 2000s. K-Love Classics was discontinued on November 2020; the network carried a transitional Christmas music format until January 2021, when K-Love launched two decade-based networks to replace it—"K-Love 90s" and "K-Love 2000s".

In 2019, the EMF announced that it would acquire five stations from Cumulus Media, including most prominently New York's WPLJ.

In February 2020, K-Love bought out Boston's last remaining rock station, WAAF, which had been a rock mainstay of the Boston area since the 1970s. Fans congregated outside the studio while DJs Mistress Carrie and Mike Hsu with program director Joe Calgaro took the helm for a 14-hour farewell program. Again, the takeover was preceded by a classic song referring to Satan, "Black Sabbath", from Black Sabbath's self-titled debut album. In the final hour, the hosts revealed that internal plans had been in place to "relaunch the station" on March 2, re-hiring station veteran Mike Brangiforte to host the morning show, replacing The Mens Room with a local night host, teaming up Hsu with Calgaro, and instituting a revamped music playlist curated by Mistress Carrie. All of these plans were immediately aborted once the sale to EMF was announced, with the ensuing "WAAF"-branded rock programming operating "as a zombie jukebox on a pair of HD subchannels and Radio.com," without any air personalities.

In September 2022, the network marked the 40th anniversary of KCLB's launch. In February 2026, it was announced that, jointly through a partnership with Radio Vita, K-Love would expand internationally to airing stations in Europe and Africa.

== Ministry ==
K-Love has a full-time ministry team that processes over 100 phone calls a day from listeners seeking guidance. According to the ministry, the pastors and staff at K-Love pray for over 1,000 prayer requests every day, and on average, intervene in one suicide case per day. Requests are submitted online or over the phone.

K-Love also partners with other ministries and donates air time and web site space to these ministries.

== Awards and nominations ==
=== Christian Music Broadcasters Echo Awards ===
Year	Category	Nominee(s)	Result
2007	Air Personality of the Year (Markets 1-25 & Networks)	David Pierce (K-LOVE)	Nominated
2007	Air Personality of the Year (Markets 1-25 & Networks)	Jon & Sherry Rivers (K-LOVE)	Nominated
2007	Industry Impact	EMF (K-LOVE & Air1)	Nominated
2007	Music Director of the Year (Markets 1-25 & Networks)	Jon Rivers (K-LOVE)	Nominated
2007	Program Director of the Year (Markets 1-25 & Networks)	David Pierce (K-LOVE)	Nominated
2011	Promotions Director of the Year	Mike Tedesco (K-LOVE & Air1)	Won
2013	Station of the Year - Major Market	K-LOVE	Won

=== National Religious Broadcasters Awards ===
Year	Category	Nominee(s)	Result
2013	Billy Graham Award for Excellence in Christian Communications	K-LOVE & Air1	Won

=== Best Christian Workplaces ===
Year	Category	Nominee(s)	Result
2004	Media	EMF (K-LOVE & Air1)	Won
2006	Media (100+ Employees)	EMF (K-LOVE & Air1)	Won
2007	Media (100+ Employees)	EMF (K-LOVE & Air1)	Won

== Finances ==
K-Love is governed by the Educational Media Foundation, a nonprofit, multi-platform media company. No individual owns any stock in the corporation, which is held for charitable purposes. Members of the board of directors at large serve without compensation for rotating four-year terms, and a person with supervisory accounting experience holds one of the board positions.

K-Love stations are licensed as non-commercial educational stations; therefore, most of its funding is provided by donations. The majority of donations are made during seasonal pledge drives, usually held in the spring and in the fall.

In addition, EMF is a member of the Evangelical Council for Financial Accountability (ECFA). Founded by Billy Graham, the ECFA oversees EMF's financial affairs, ethics and reporting standards.

EMF is recognized by Charity Navigator with a Four-Star rating, the highest given to charities. In addition, EMF is audited yearly by an independent accounting firm, ensuring accuracy and completeness of its books and records.

== See also ==
- Air1
- K-Love Classics
- List of radio stations in California
