= Chris Mason (musician) =

American Christian singer-songwriter

- Genres: Contemporary Christian
- Occupation: Singer-songwriter
- Years active: 2001–present
- Website: www.chrismasonmusic.com

Chris Mason is an American Christian singer-songwriter. Raised in the outskirts of Atlanta, Mason attended Berry College in Rome, Georgia, majoring in Family Counseling until graduating in 2001.

After graduating he began his musical career, releasing his first album Not So Gracefully (2001). After touring for two years, he settled in Nashville, Tennessee and began work on his second release, Crowded Spaces (2003), which was produced with the help of Andrew Osenga and Cason Cooley, both former members of the band The Normals.

In 2006, he released an EP, Songs One Through Six, again working with Osenga and Cooley. That year Mason also co-founded the Square Peg Alliance with 12 other independent Christian artists.

== Discography ==
- Songs One Through Six (EP) (2006)
- Crowded Spaces (2003)
- Not So Gracefully (2001)

== See also ==
- The Square Peg Alliance
