= Clear to Venus =

Studio album by Andrew Peterson
- Released: September 11, 2001
- Genres: Christian pop, Christian rock, folk rock, roots rock, country gospel, folk, rock, country, bluegrass, blues
- Length: 42:17
- Label: Essential
- Producer: Glenn Rosenstein

Andrew Peterson chronology
Carried Along (2000)	Clear to Venus (2001)	Love and Thunder (2003)

Clear to Venus is the third album by American singer-songwriter Andrew Peterson, released in 2001.

== Background ==
Peterson worked with Glenn Rosenstein, in the production of this album. Essential Records released the album on September 11, 2001.

== Musical style ==
Reviewing the album for Christianity Today, Russ Breimeier recognizes, "Though it's still very much rooted in acoustic guitar-based folk music (like Andrew's first album, Carried Along), there's something about Clear to Venus that's more "roots pop" in sound."

== Critical reception ==
Professional ratings
Review scores
Source	Rating
AllMusic	3/5 stars
Cross Rhythms	10/10 squares

Giving the album ten out of ten in Cross Rhythms and comparing it to the work of Rich Mullins, Paul Obrey writes, "The comparison is made not to describe Peterson's style of music, though the Mullins influence is clearly there, but to portray the artistry and ingenuity of this style of storytelling, that brings revelation of God's character." Ashleigh Kittle, awarding the album three stars at AllMusic, states, "Clear to Venus clearly testifies to Peterson's ability to relate to audiences in an honest and personal manner."

== Track listing ==
All tracks are written by Andrew Peterson unless otherwise noted.

No.	Title	Writer(s)	Length
1.	"No More Faith"		4:14
2.	"Isn't It Love"		3:17
3.	"Mary Picked the Roses"	Rich Mullins, Peterson, Scott	3:59
4.	"Loose Change"		3:18
5.	"Let Me Sing"		4:15
6.	"Steady as She Goes"		4:31
7.	"Song and Dance"	Andrew Peterson, Gabe Scott	3:42
8.	"Hold Up My Arms"		3:23
9.	"Alaska or Bust"	Randall Goodgame, Peterson	4:07
10.	"Venus"		4:57
11.	"Why Walk When You Can Fly (Note: CD contains hidden track "Land of the Free" causing the track's length to become 7:13)"	Mary Chapin Carpenter	2:34
Total length:			42:17

== Personnel ==
- Andrew Peterson – lead vocals, acoustic guitars
- Matt Rollings – acoustic piano (1, 2, 5, 7–11), Hammond B3 organ (1, 2, 5, 7–11)
- Glenn Rosenstein – Hammond B3 organ (3, 6), Mellotron (6), glockenspiel (6), programming (7)
- Dan Tyminski – mandolin (2, 5, 9, 11)
- Al Perkins – dobro (4, 11), pedal steel guitar (9, 10)
- Joey Canaday – bass (1–7, 9–11)
- Will Denton – drums (1, 3, 5–7, 10)
- Ken Lewis – percussion (1, 2, 4–7, 9, 10)
- Gabe Scott – hammered dulcimer (1), backing vocals, accordion (9)
- John Catchings – cello (4, 8)
- Jamie Peterson – backing vocals
- Wendy Moten – backing vocals (5)

== Chart performance ==
Chart (2001)	Peak position
US Top Christian Albums (Billboard)	27
