= Slugs & Bugs =

Family music brand

Slugs & Bugs is a family music brand by American singer-songwriter Randall Goodgame, inspired by and beginning with Slugs & Bugs & Lullabies (2007), a joint album by Goodgame and friend and collaborator Andrew Peterson. Other Slugs and Bugs projects include the Slugs & Bugs LIVE! concert series (2009–present), the albums A Slugs & Bugs Christmas (2010), Slugs & Bugs Under Where? (2011), and Sing the Bible with Slugs & Bugs (2014). In 2019, Slugs & Bugs released, four picture books in partnership with Lifeway and the all-new Slugs & Bugs Show – Good times, good music, and Good News share the stage in a 13-episode TV series. Modern Kids, the first silly song project in ten years, was released in May 2020.

An April 2015 Parents Life review of Sing the Bible with Slugs & Bugs – which features 18 tracks of direct Bible quotations set to music, said the album "possesses a high-quality artistic sensibility that few children's CDs maintain", adding that the songs would "have kids memorizing Scripture in no time".

Other notable collaborators on various Slugs & Bugs projects include the African Children's Choir and The Jesus Storybook Bible author Sally Lloyd-Jones.

TV Show

Mission: “Use creative media to entertain, laugh, and inspire kids and families as they journey toward deeper understandings of timeless truths about life and faith.”

The Slugs & Bugs Show workshop is an imaginative and wonder-filled space where the characters, guests and audience are invited to join in creative expressions of all kinds. And this is not just for “artistic-types” but instead finding joy and delight in every day experiences and contributions. Each of these demonstrate the amazing gift of sub-creation as we learn about God, the creator of all things and the universe.

At the workshop, value adventures with characters that are curious and authentic. Discipleship in learning is the model in following and growing in friendship with Jesus. In that, the characters relate in “real” ways that reflect every day experiences. The characters can engage the sacred with the same precocious and self-aware approach as any child would. Questions that lead to discovery, is the key! As it relates to these sacred insights, there is great care to avoid lengthy verbal teaching and instead allow more subtle learning from experience with story to be the primary conduit. Given the option of entertaining the audience with stories and situational comedy or conveying teaching that is highly detailed and towards propaganda, the Show will always favor earning the audience through story.

As a family show, it is not afraid of communicating above the primary audience age target of 2–7 yr old boys and girls (pre-school to early elementary). Some of the concepts and dialogue will be absorbed more deeply by parents and older siblings, but the aim is to offer dual channels in those moments. While one more robust idea is being communicated, the Show creates a more accessible visual moment with our characters and environment.

Guests are a big part of the Slugs & Bugs Show world and many of Randall Goodgame’s (host and founder) friends are curious to visit and see what goes on here. These friends often come by just to visit, but are always caught up in the adventure or activity of the day. They will often reference a skill or area of interest they have, be that music producing, theological teaching, writing or playing an instrument!

== Discography ==
Music

- Slugs & Bugs Lullabies (February 22, 2008)
- Slugs & Bugs Christmas (10/12/2011)
- Slugs & Bugs Under Where? (October 25, 2011)
- Sing The Bible Vol 1 (8/12/2014)
- Sing The Bible Vol 2 (March 18, 2016)
- Sing The Gospel (10/11/2016)
- Sing The Bible Family Christmas (October 20, 2017)
- Sing The Bible Vol 3 (April 27, 2018)
- Slugs & Bugs The Videos Vol 1 (2017)
- Slugs & Bugs The Videos Vol 2 (2018)
- Modern Kid (April 17, 2020)

Books

- Who Will You Play With Me?
- Are We Still Friends?
- The Society of Extraordinary Raccoon Society
- The Society of Extraordinary Raccoon Society on Boasting

TV Show

- The Slugs & Bugs Show: Season 1 (2019)
  - Silly Tractor (Ep.1)
  - Special Delivery (Ep. 2)
  - Let’s Collaborate! (Ep. 3)
  - Adopted Birthday (Ep. 4)
  - True Friendship (Ep. 5)
  - Tasting a Feast (Ep. 6)
  - Creativity (Ep. 7)
  - Fair Cupcakes (Ep. 8)
  - Showing Love (Ep. 9)
  - Misinterpretation (Ep. 10)
  - Afraid of Bears (Ep. 11)
  - Never Alone (Ep. 12)
  - A Song to Sing (Ep. 13)
- Slugs and Bugs: Make Ready for Christmas (2020)
- The Slugs & Bugs Show: Season 2 (2021)
  - Justice for All (Ep. 1)
  - Friends in the Journey (Ep. 2)
  - Under Where? (Ep. 3)
  - Modern Kid (Ep. 4)
  - Words Have Power (Ep. 5)
  - Mentor from Space (Ep. 6)
  - Two Kinds of Cool (Ep. 7)
  - Uncertain about Wonder (Ep. 8)
  - Who's Got the Ball? (Ep. 9)
  - Power to Share (Ep. 10)
  - I've Got a Balloon (Ep. 11)

== Live Tour ==
- Toured extensively throughout the U.S. including in 25 states, playing 350+ shows.
- International tours in the UK (2019), Malaysia (2018), and New Zealand (2019)
