= North! Or Be Eaten =

2008 novel by Andrew Peterson

- Author: Andrew Peterson
- Audio read by: Peter Sandon
- Illustrator: Andrew Peterson
- Language: English
- Series: The Wingfeather Saga
- Release number: 2
- Genre: Fantasy novel
- Publisher: WaterBrook Press
- Publication date: August 18, 2009
- Publication place: United States
- Media type: Print (Paperback)
- Pages: 331
- ISBN: 978-1-4000-7387-0
- Preceded by: On the Edge of the Dark Sea of Darkness
- Followed by: The Monster in the Hollows
- Website: wingfeathersaga.com

North! Or Be Eaten is a fantasy novel by Andrew Peterson. It is the second novel in The Wingfeather Saga. It follows On the Edge of the Dark Sea of Darkness and is followed by The Monster in the Hollows and The Warden and the Wolf King.

North! Or Be Eaten follows the continuing adventures and misadventures of the Igiby family and their disturbed ally Peet the Sock Man as they flee towards the Northern Ice Prairies after their town is destroyed at the end of the previous book. In the process the family is separated, and each member undergoes many trials before they are reunited.

The paperback includes two maps, several illustrations, and appendices, including a poem and a passage from "The First Book," both fictional works referenced in the text. As in the first book in the series, the author expands the readers' knowledge of the world through the use of humorous footnotes.

== Awards ==
North! Or Be Eaten received a Christy Award in 2010.
