= Bathing in the New Economy =

Bathing in the New Economy (EP)

EP by Emmet Swimming
- Released: 2003, 2009
- Recorded: Recording Arts, Merrifield, VA/Reflections Studio, Charlotte, NC
- Genre: Rock, alternative rock
- Label: Screaming Goddess Music
- Producer: Marco Delmar/Don Dixon

Emmet Swimming chronology
Earplugs 50¢ (1999)	Bathing in the New Economy (EP) (2003)	this kid walks into a bar... (2013)

Bathing in the New Economy is the fifth album and first EP released from the band emmet swimming. It was re-released in 2009 with bonus tracks.

== Track listing (2003 Screaming Goddess release) ==
All lyrics are written by Todd Watts; all music is composed by emmet swimming.

No.	Title	Length
1.	"Introduction"	0:05
2.	"The Dance"	3:37
3.	"Don't Call Her"	4:37
4.	"Heart Like an Eskimo"	3:07
5.	"Johanna at the Door"	4:44

== Track listing (2009 Screaming Goddess release) ==
All lyrics are written by Todd Watts; all music is composed by emmet swimming.

No.	Title	Length
1.	"The Dance"	3:37
2.	"Don't Call Her"	4:37
3.	"Heart Like an Eskimo"	3:07
4.	"Johanna at the Door"	4:44
6.	"Door 2"	2:26
7.	"Waving At Cars" (amazon.com bonus track)	3:34

== Personnel ==
- Todd Watts - Vocals, Guitar
- Erik Wenberg - Guitar, backing vocals
- Luke Michel - Bass
- Derrick Decker - Drums
- Tamer Eid - Drums
- Antonio Pacheco - Engineer
- Bev Stanton - Engineer
- Mark Williams - Engineer
