= Earplugs 50¢ =

Live album by emmet swimming
- Released: 1999
- Recorded: 9:30 Club/Alley Katz
- Genres: Rock, alternative rock
- Length: 1:00:01
- Label: Screaming Goddess Records
- Producer: emmet swimming

Emmet swimming chronology
| Big Night Without You (1998) | Earplugs 50¢ (1999) | Bathing in the New Economy (EP) (2003) |

Professional ratings
Review scores
| Source | Rating |
|---|---|
| Allmusic | 2.5/5 stars |

Earplugs 50¢ is the fifth album and first live album released from the band emmet swimming. It revisits more than a dozen tunes, infusing many of them, according to Mike Joyce, with a bar band energy that rarely survived the band's studio efforts.

== Track listing ==
| No. | Title | Lyrics | Music | Length |
|---|---|---|---|---|
| 1. | "Stealing From the Joneses" | Todd Watts | emmet swimming | 3:55 |
| 2. | "Parking Lot" | Todd Watts | emmet swimming | 3:49 |
| 3. | "Fist Like a Glove" | Todd Watts | emmet swimming | 4:04 |
| 4. | "Fake Wood Trim" | Todd Watts | emmet swimming | 3:08 |
| 5. | "Poor Tortured Rock Star (Guru)" | Todd Watts | emmet swimming | 3:46 |
| 6. | "South Bristol, ME" | Todd Watts | emmet swimming | 4:45 |
| 7. | "Three and a Half on Six" | Todd Watts | emmet swimming | 1:18 |
| 8. | "Arlington" | Todd Watts | emmet swimming | 3:58 |
| 9. | "Levi Stubbs' Tears" | Billy Bragg | Billy Bragg | 3:16 |
| 10. | "Broken Oar" | Todd Watts | emmet swimming | 5:22 |
| 11. | "Playing House" | Todd Watts | emmet swimming | 3:41 |
| 12. | "Sunblock" | Todd Watts | emmet swimming | 4:40 |
| 13. | "Jump in the Water" | Todd Watts | emmet swimming | 3:49 |
| 14. | "So Lonely/Down Under" | Sting, Colin Hay, Ron Strykert | Sting, Colin Hay, Ron Strykert | 6:48 |
| 15. | "Tom Collins" | Todd Watts | emmet swimming | 3:41 |

== Personnel ==
- Todd Watts - Vocals, Guitar
- Erik Wenberg - Guitar, backing vocals
- Luke Michel - Bass
- Tamer Eid - Drums
- Mark Williams - Engineer
