= Slugs & Bugs & Lullabies =

Studio album by Andrew Peterson, Randall Goodgame
- Released: December 2008
- Recorded: 2008
- Genre: Pop, children
- Length: 4:43
- Label: Independent

Slugs & Bugs albums chronology
Slugs & Bugs & Lullabies (2006)	A Slugs & Bugs Christmas (2010)

Randall Goodgame albums singles chronology
"Slugs & Bugs & Lullabies" (2006)

Slugs & Bugs & Lullabies is a joint album by the American singer-songwriter Andrew Peterson and his friend and collaborator Randall Goodgame, released in 2007. It is the eighth album by Petersen and contains 18 original songs. "You Can Always Come Home" was used on the Veggie Tales' The Wonderful Wizard of Ha's (2007). The CD contains a hidden track before track 1 which can be found by seeking to track one and rewinding.

== Track listing ==
1. "Hidden Track" – 0:00
2. "Stop" – 2:41
3. "Post Office Song" – 2:30
4. "Piggy Little Toes" – 1:57
5. "God Made Me Listen" – 1:38
6. "Dreams" – 2:58
7. "Bears" – 2:14
8. "Who's Got The Ball" – 3:33
9. "Up" – 0:22
10. "Tractor Tractor" – 4:06
11. "Chicken Wiggle" – 2:15
12. "Beans" – 1:26
13. "Tiger" – 1:28
14. "The Boy Who Was Bored" – 2:03
15. "You Can Always Come Home" – 2:36
16. "The Lord Bless and Keep You" – 2:33
17. "Beautiful Girl" – 1:44
18. "My Baby Loves To Dance" – 2:17
19. "Settle In, My Little Child, And Sleep" – 2:22

== Related projects ==
Subsequent to its initial release, led by Goodgame, Slugs & Bugs & Lullabies inspired the Slugs & Bugs family music brand which launched several related projects, including a Slugs & Bugs LIVE! concert series (2009–present), the music albums A Slugs & Bugs Christmas (2010), Slugs & Bugs Under Where? (2011) and Sing the Bible with Slugs & Bugs (2013). Other notable collaborators on various Slugs & Bugs projects include the African Children's Choir and The Jesus Storybook Bible author Sally Lloyd-Jones.
