= This Kid Walks into a Bar... =

this kid walks into a bar...

Studio album by Emmet Swimming
- Released: 2013
- Studio: Recording Arts, Merrifield; Ocean Way, Nashville; Reflections, Charlotte
- Genre: Rock, alternative rock
- Label: Screaming Goddess Music
- Producer: Marco Delmar/Peter Collins/Don Dixon

Emmet Swimming chronology
Bathing in the New Economy (EP) (2003)	this kid walks into a bar... (2013)

this kid walks into a bar... is the sixth album from the band emmet swimming. It was their first album in 10 years.

== Track listing ==
All lyrics are written by Todd Watts; all music is composed by emmet swimming.

No.	Title	Length
1.	"Heading South"	3:23
2.	"Just Called A Cab"	3:07
3.	"No Matter What You Say"	3:04
4.	"Crawl"	3:45
5.	"Same As Me"	5:29
6.	"Big Night Without You" (Produced by Peter Collins)	2:28
7.	"Three Years Ago" (Produced by Don Dixon)	3:33

== Personnel ==
- Todd Watts - Vocals, Guitar
- Erik Wenberg - Guitar, backing vocals
- Scott Brotemarkle - Bass, backing vocals
- Luke Michel - Bass
- Tamer Eid - Drums
- Marco Delmar - Engineer
- Stephanie Milne - Engineer
- Ken Barnum - Engineer
- Jessica Bowles - Engineer
- Paul David Hager - Engineer
- Mark Williams - Engineer
