= Dark When the Snow Falls =

dark when the snow falls

Studio album by Emmet Swimming
- Released: 1993
- Recorded: Bebop Productions, Rockville, MD
- Genre: Rock, alternative rock
- Length: 51:14
- Label: Screaming Goddess Records
- Producer: Marco Delmar

Emmet Swimming chronology
| dark when the snow falls (1993) | wake (1994) |

dark when the snow falls is the first album released from the band emmet swimming. The Washington Area Music Association awarded the album Best Debut Recording in 1993. The song "misgiven" was included on the Xemu Records compilation Music from the Motion Picture "Crimson Lights"

== Track listing ==
All lyrics are written by Todd Watts; all music is composed by emmet swimming.

| No. | Title | Length |
|---|---|---|
| 1. | "Clean Water" | 2:53 |
| 2. | "South Bristol, ME" | 3:35 |
| 3. | "Hey Jesse" | 3:18 |
| 4. | "Blue Moon" | 3:55 |
| 5. | "This is My Life" | 3:23 |
| 6. | "Angst II" | 4:43 |
| 7. | "I Will(Requiem for a Farmer)" | 6:00 |
| 8. | "Judas" | 3:47 |
| 9. | "Falling Down" | 4:08 |
| 10. | "Goodbye My Old Friend" | 3:52 |
| 11. | "Misgiven" | 4:12 |
| 12. | "Searching for Heaven" | 3:28 |
| 13. | "Lose Yourself" | 3:50 |

== Awards ==
| Year | Ceremony | Award | Result |
|---|---|---|---|
| 1993 | Washington Area Music Awards | Debut Recording | Won |

== Personnel ==
- Todd Watts - Vocals, Guitar
- Erik Wenberg - Guitar, backing vocals
- James McNabb - Bass
- Tamer Eid - Drums
- Marco Delmar - Engineer
- David Amoroso - Cover Art
