= Carried Along =

2000 studio album by Andrew Peterson

Studio album by Andrew Peterson
- Released: March 21, 2000
- Studios: Dark Horse Recording, The Castle and Sound Kitchen (Franklin, Tennessee): Seventeen Grand Recording (Nashville, Tennessee)
- Genres: Christian pop, Christian rock, folk rock, roots rock, country gospel, folk, rock, country, bluegrass, blues
- Length: 42:02
- Label: Essential
- Producer: Glenn Rosenstein

Andrew Peterson chronology
| Walk (1996) | Carried Along (2000) | Clear to Venus (2001) |

Carried Along is the second album by American singer-songwriter Andrew Peterson, released in 2000.

== Background ==
Peterson worked with Glenn Rosenstein, in the production of this album. Essential Records released the album on March 21, 2000.

== Critical reception ==
Professional ratings
Review scores
| Source | Rating |
|---|---|
| AllMusic | 3/5 stars |
| Cross Rhythms | 9/10 squares |
| The Phantom Tollbooth | 4/5 |

Rating the album a four out of five at The Phantom Tollbooth, Janet Friesen states, "Andrew Peterson's music moves like a breath of fresh air weaving acoustical patterns with guitars, strings, tin whistles, and hammer dulcimars." Catherine E. Francis, giving the album a nine out of ten for Cross Rhythms, writes, "this set gives you 10 tracks of folk and country-tinged acoustic pop that is very easy on the ears." Awarding the album three stars from AllMusic, Ashleigh Kittle says, "The project features a strong folk sound, at times blended with pop influences."

== Track listing ==
All tracks are written by Andrew Peterson unless otherwise noted.

| No. | Title | Writer(s) | Length |
|---|---|---|---|
| 1. | "All the Way Home" | | 4:52 |
| 2. | "The Chasing Song" | | 3:43 |
| 3. | "Faith to Be Strong" | Peterson, Gabe Scott | 3:30 |
| 4. | "Nothing to Say" | | 4:40 |
| 5. | "Love Enough" | Peterson, Scott | 3:25 |
| 6. | "The Coral Castle" | | 3:15 |
| 7. | "Shiloh" | Peterson, C.J. Fluharty | 4:16 |
| 8. | "Come, Lord Jesus" | | 5:13 |
| 9. | "Rise and Shine" | Peterson, Scott | 5:00 |
| 10. | "The Ninety and Nine" | Clephane, Sankey, Gabe Scott, Andrew Peterson | 4:08 |
| Total length: | | | 42:02 |

== Chart performance ==
| Chart (2000) | Peak position |
|---|---|
| US Top Christian Albums (Billboard) | 32 |

== Personnel ==
- Andrew Peterson – lead vocals, acoustic guitar (1–3, 7), 12-string acoustic guitar (4, 9), mandolin (10)
- Matt Rollings – acoustic piano (1, 6, 8), Hammond B3 organ (1, 2, 4, 8, 9)
- Gabe Scott – acoustic guitar (1–8, 10), backing vocals (1–8, 10), accordion (6), hammered dulcimer (9)
- Glenn Rosenstein – electric guitars (1, 9)
- Ron Block – banjo (5, 7)
- Al Perkins – pedal steel guitar (5, 7)
- Aubrey Haynie – mandolin (10), violin (10)
- Craig Young – bass guitar (1, 4, 5, 7–10)
- Barry Bales – upright bass (2, 3, 6)
- Chris McHugh – drums (1, 4, 5, 9), percussion (8)
- Ken Lewis – percussion (1–5, 7–10)
- Sam Levine – penny whistle (10)
- John Catchings – cello (3, 4, 9, 10)
- Jamie Peterson – backing vocals (1, 2, 4, 5, 7–10)
- Aedan Peterson – laughter (10)

Strings (Tracks 4 & 9)

- Conni Ellisor – arrangements
- Pamela Sixfin – contractor and concertmaster
- Bob Mason – cello
- Craig Nelson – double bass
- Gary Vanosdale and Kristin Wilkinson – viola
- David Angell, David Davidson, Lee Larrison, Cate Myer, Christian Teal, Alan Umstead and Karen Winklemann – violin

=== Production ===
- Robert Beeson – executive producer
- Cliff Young – executive producer
- Glenn Rosenstein– producer
- Gary Paczosa – engineer, mixing
- Phil Cooper – assistant engineer
- Bob Horn – assistant engineer
- Thomas Johnson – assistant engineer
- Ken Love – mastering at MasterMix (Nashville, Tennessee)
- Michelle Kapp – design
- Michael Wilson – photography
- Aaron Tate – management
