= Letters to the Editor, Vol. 1 =

EP by Andrew Osenga
- Released: June 2007
- Recorded: The Velvet Eagle, Nashville, TN
- Genre: Singer-songwriter
- Length: 20:51
- Label: House of Mirrors Music
- Producer: Andrew Osenga

Andrew Osenga chronology
| The Morning (2006) | Letters to the Editor, Vol. 1 (2007) | Letters to the Editor, Vol. 2 (2008) |

Professional ratings
Review scores
| Source | Rating |
|---|---|
| Christianity Today | link |

Letters to the Editor, Vol. 1 (2007) is an acoustic EP from Andrew Osenga. Recorded and mixed in his Nashville, TN basement studio, Letters to the Editor, Vol. 1 was released online as a free digital-only download from his website in June 2007. It is his fourth solo project, following the full-length studio album The Morning (2006).

The album is the result of an interesting experiment: Andrew asked the internet fan community that read his blog to send in pictures, drawings, paintings, stories, cool words, or ideas that he would develop into fully fleshed-out songs. Each of the six songs on the album draw primarily from these submissions, an example of a unique form of community interaction between fan and artist.

== Track listing ==
1. "Wanted" – 2:49
2. "The Ball Game" – 3:45
3. "You Leave No Shadow" – 3:46
4. "Anna and the Aliens" – 3:07
5. "The Blessing Curse" – 2:40
6. "Swing Wide the Glimmering Gates" – 4:45

== Credits ==
- Andrew Osenga – vocals, acoustic guitars, high-strung acoustic guitar
- Alison Osenga – background vocals ("ooh" part on "The Ball Game")
- Crystal Davy – WebGround Vocals and ad-lib part on "Swing Wide the Glimmering Gates"
- Bryan Kandel, Amanda McClendon, Elijah Davidson, Evan Godbold, Steven McNeill, Tony Kevin, Kramer Kevin, Jeremy Moore, Hunter Chorey, Rick DePirro, Ross Harris, Mary Elizabeth Washburn, Matt Washburn, Ben Bryan, Seth Ellsworth, Joshua Anderson, Michael Chen, Chris Day, Sean Hennigan, Jason Sessoms, Andrew Costerisan, Greg Adkins, Paige Hampton, Matthew Mcdaniel, Jason Kamin, Katherine Kamin, Fred Egan, Joshua Thomas, Andrew Webb, Mark Miller, Drew Raines, Jeff Brown, Leah Brown, George Collins, Chris Hubbs, Melissa Taylor – WebGround Vocals on "Swing Wide the Glimmering Gates"

== Trivia ==
- The final song on the EP, "Swing Wide the Glimmering Gates," features a background chorus consisting of 36 of his fans recording themselves at home singing a harmony. Andrew combined all of the individual voices together, ending the album with the voices of the very people it was made for.
