= On the Edge of the Dark Sea of Darkness =

2008 novel by Andrew Peterson

- Author: Andrew Peterson
- Audio read by: Peter Sandon
- Illustrator: Andrew Peterson, Justin Gerard
- Cover artist: Mark D. Ford
- Language: English
- Series: The Wingfeather Saga
- Release number: 1
- Genre: Fantasy novel
- Publisher: WaterBrook Press
- Publication date: March 18, 2008
- Publication place: United States
- Media type: Print (Paperback)
- Pages: 284 pp
- ISBN: 978-1-4000-7384-9
- OCLC: 166358701
- LC Class: PZ7.P4431 On 2008
- Followed by: North! Or Be Eaten
- Website: wingfeathersaga.com

On the Edge of the Dark Sea of Darkness is a fantasy novel published in 2008, written by Andrew Peterson. It is the first book in The Wingfeather Saga series, and is followed by North! Or Be Eaten, The Monster in the Hollows, and The Warden and the Wolf King.

== About ==
On The Edge of the Dark Sea of Darkness is about three siblings, Janner, Tink and Leeli Igiby; their mother, Nia Igiby; their ex-pirate grandfather, Podo Helmer; and the Fangs of Dang. The Fangs are lizard-like conquerors of the land of Skree whose lives' purpose seems to be to keep all the humans in the land of Skree miserable and unable to fight back, and who serve a mysterious person called Gnag the Nameless. Later, Gnag the Nameless wants the Jewels of Anneria, and he thinks the Igibys are in possession of the Jewels.

The first edition book contains two maps, several illustrations, and appendices, including poems and some of the Fangs' bureaucratic forms, all by Peterson. The fifty-one chapter book has three short prologues describing the different countries as well as an anecdote about how the world got its name. The author uses humorous footnotes as an aid to his storytelling throughout.

== Plot ==
The book opens with Janner Igiby lying in bed reciting in his mind a nursery rhyme about the Black Carriage, which kidnaps children every night. In the morning, he and his siblings hurry to finish their chores so that they can participate in the annual Dragon Day Festival.

== Awards ==
On the Edge of the Dark Sea of Darkness won The Evangelical Christian Publishers Association (ECPA)/Dickinson Press Book Cover Award recognizing excellence in book cover design in the category of Best Cover from a Mid-level Publisher for 2008.

On March 21, during the Christian Book Expo in Dallas, Texas, On the Edge of the Dark Sea of Darkness was announced as a nominee for the 2009 Christy Award in the Young Adult category. It lost to I Have Seen Him in the Watchfires by Cathy Gohlke (Moody Publishers). The Christy Award recognizes novelists and novels of excellence in several genres of Christian fiction.
