= Wake (Emmet Swimming album) =

wake

Studio album by emmet swimming
- Released: 1994, 1995
- Recorded: Bebop Productions, Rockville, MD / Long View Farm, North Brookfield, MA
- Genre: rock, alternative rock
- Length: 45:26
- Label: Screaming Goddess Music, Epic Records
- Producer: Marco Delmar / Glenn Rosenstein (1995 Epic Release Tracks 1,3 and 8)

Emmet swimming chronology
dark when the snow falls (1993)	wake (1994)	Arlington to Boston (1996)

Professional ratings
Review scores
Source	Rating
Allmusic	3/5 stars

wake is the second album released from the band emmet swimming. This album was released twice; first as an independent release and later as an Epic Records release. The 1994 Screaming Goddess Music release differs from the Epic Records re-release of wake. The 1994 release included the song "I Believe" and has a varied track sequence. The song "Boones Farm Wine" is re-titled "I'll Be Fine" on the Epic Records re-release of wake. The 1995 Epic Records release added the songs "Jump In The Water" and "Ed's Song." The song "Broken Oar" also differs with a new production of the song.

== Track listing (1994 Screaming Goddess release) ==
All lyrics are written by Todd Watts; all music is composed by emmet swimming.

No.	Title	Length
1.	"Boones Farm Wine"	3:07
2.	"Expect Me"	2:43
3.	"You're So Pretty"	3:45
4.	"When Morning Comes"	3:46
5.	"Never Going Back"	3:20
6.	"I Hear Voices"	3:36
7.	"Never Crawl"	3:04
8.	"Rain Pours Down"	3:57
9.	"I Believe"	4:39
10.	"Broken Oar"	4:40
11.	"A Season"	5:45
12.	"Listen to the River"	2:54

== Track listing (1995 Epic release) ==
All lyrics are written by Todd Watts; all music is composed by emmet swimming.

No.	Title	Length
1.	"Jump In The Water" (Produced by Glenn Rosenstein)	3:48
2.	"Expect Me"	2:46
3.	"I'll Be Fine"	3:02
4.	"Broken Oar" (Produced by Glenn Rosenstein)	4:41
5.	"You're So Pretty"	3:45
6.	"Rain Pours Down"	3:54
7.	"I Hear Voices"	4:08
8.	"Ed's Song" (Produced by Glenn Rosenstein)	3:54
9.	"When Morning Comes"	3:47
10.	"A Season"	5:41
11.	"Never Going Back"	3:23
12.	"Listen to the River"	2:54
13.	"Never Crawl"	3:07

== Awards ==
Year	Ceremony	Award	Result
1995	Washington Area Music Awards	Alternative Rock Recording	Won
1995	Washington Area Music Awards	Album of the Year	Won

== Personnel ==
- Todd Watts - Vocals, Guitar
- Erik Wenberg - Guitar, backing vocals
- Robert Shaw - Bass
- Tamer Eid - Drums
- Marco Delmar - Engineer
- Steve Boyer (1995 Epic Release Tracks 1,3 and 8) - Engineer
- David Amoroso - Cover Art/Photography
