= Eric Peters (musician) =

- Born: Eric Charles Peters; October 3, 1972 (age 54); Baton Rouge, Louisiana
- Origin: Nashville, Tennessee
- Genres: pop, folk, CCM
- Occupations: Singer, songwriter, guitarist
- Instruments: vocals, singer-songwriter, guitar
- Years active: 1995–present
- Formerly of: Ridgely
- Website: ericpeters.net

Eric Charles Peters (born October 3, 1972) is an American musician and guitarist, who mainly plays acoustic pop and folk-pop music. He has released ten studio albums, More than Watchman (1999), Land of the Living (2001), Miracle of Forgetting (2003), Bookmark (2004), Scarce (2006), Chrome (2009), Birds of Relocation (2012), Far Side of the Sea (2016), Earth Has No Sorrow: A Hymns Project (2020), and EP (2023).

== Early and personal life ==
Peters was born, Eric Charles Peters, on October 3, 1972, in Baton Rouge, Louisiana. He married Danielle Ellis, on October 4, 1997. They now reside in Nashville, Tennessee.

== Music career ==
His music career started in 1995, with the band Ridgely. They released two albums, Ridgely in 1995 and The Only Thing in 1997. He started his solo music career in 1999 with the release, More than Watchman, his first studio album. Since then nine more have followed suit: Land of the Living in 2001, Miracle of Forgetting in 2003, Bookmark in 2004, Scarce in 2006, Chrome in 2009, and Birds of Relocation in 2012, Far Side of the Sea in 2016, Earth Has No Sorrow: A Hymns Project in 2020, and EP in 2023.

== Discography ==
Studio albums

- More than Watchman (1999)
- Land of the Living (2001)
- Miracle of Forgetting (2003)
- Bookmark (2004)
- Scarce (2006)
- Chrome (2009)
- Birds of Relocation (2012)
- Far Side of the Sea (2016)
- Earth Has No Sorrow: A Hymns Project (2020)
- EP (2023)
