= Christian Music Planet =

Bi-monthly music magazine. Started by "Educational Media Foundation" in 2002

- Categories: Music magazine
- Frequency: Bi-monthly
- Founded: 2002
- First issue: September/October 2002
- Final issue: March/April 2007
- Company: Salem Communications Corp.
- Country: United States
- Based in: Rocklin, CA
- Language: English
- ISSN: 1551-3181
- OCLC: 55942251

Christian Music Planet was a bi-monthly music magazine that was started by Educational Media Foundation (EMF) in 2002. The first issue was published in September/October 2002. The magazine was owned and operated by EMF from 2002 until 2007 when it was sold to Salem Communications Corp. The magazine was headquartered in Rocklin, California. The last issue of Christian Music Planet was published in March/April 2007.
