= Andrew Peterson (musician) =

American Christian musician and author (born 1974)

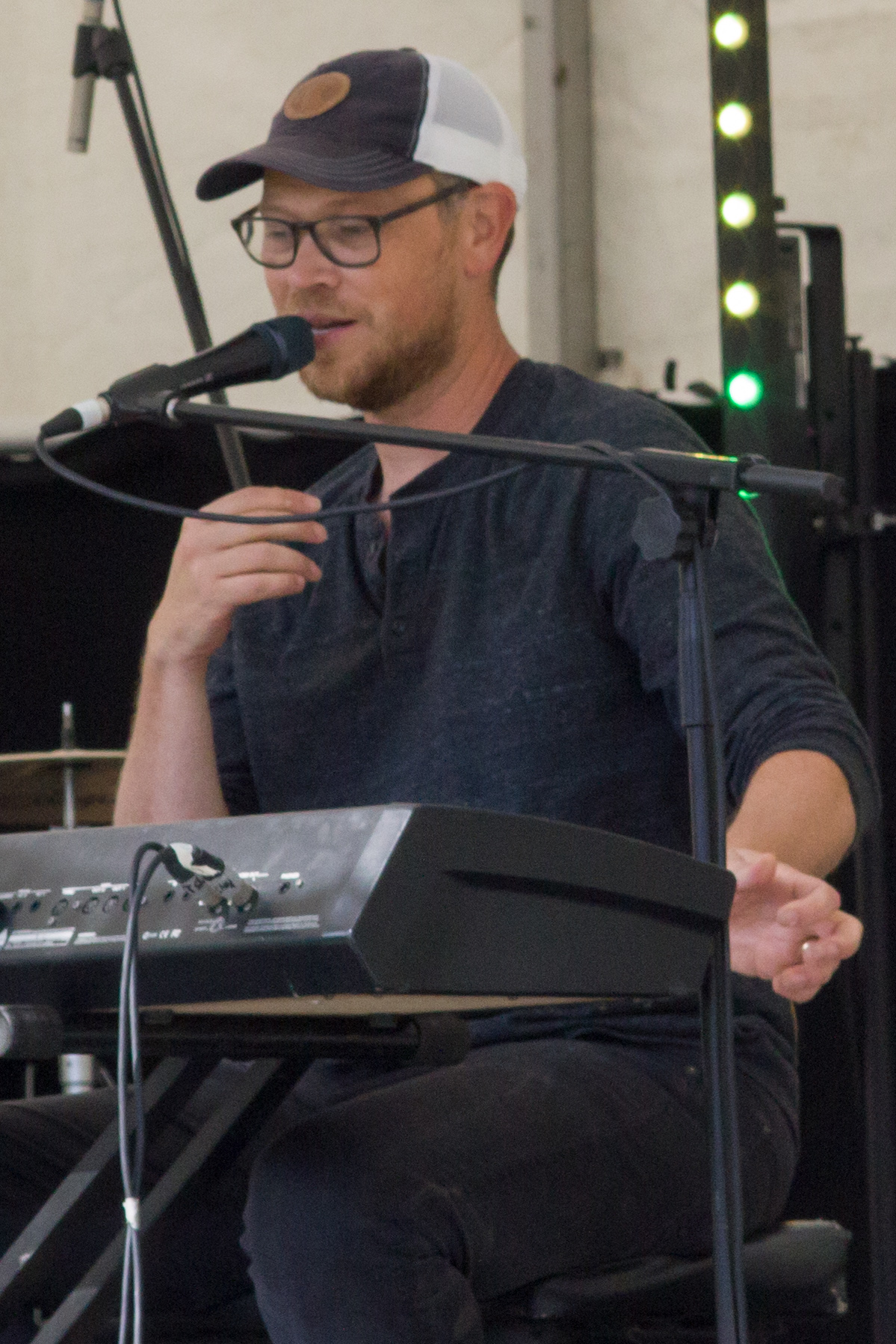
- Andrew Peterson performing in 2019

Background information
- Born: June 4, 1974 (age 52)
- Origin: Monticello, Illinois, U.S.
- Genres: Christian pop; Christian rock; folk rock; roots rock; country gospel; folk; rock; country; bluegrass; blues
- Occupations: Singer; songwriter; musician; author
- Years active: 1996–present
- Labels: Centricity; Essential; Fervent
- Website: andrew-peterson.com

Andrew Peterson (born June 4, 1974) is an American Christian musician and author, who plays folk rock, roots rock, and country gospel music.

Peterson is a founding member of the Square Peg Alliance, a group of Christian songwriters. He has toured with Caedmon's Call, Fernando Ortega, Michael Card, Sara Groves, Bebo Norman, Nichole Nordeman, Jill Phillips, Andy Gullahorn, Ben Shive, Eric Peters, and other members of the Square Peg Alliance.

Peterson is the author of The Wingfeather Saga series of children and young adult fantasy novels. The four-part series is currently being adapted into an animated TV show, for which he serves as an executive producer and provides the voice of Oskar N. Reteep and other characters.

== Musical career ==
In 1996, Peterson began touring across America with his wife Jamie and instrumentalist Gabe Scott. Peterson had yet to release a full-length album, and had no recording contract. Caedmon's Call lead guitarist and vocalist Derek Webb came across his website, and was impressed by the lyrics, leading him to invite Peterson to open for his band at an upcoming show. His performance was successful, and he was invited to join them on their 1998 tour.

This led to Peterson signing in 1999 with Watershed/Essential Records. His first full-length album, Carried Along, was released in 2000. The album, including "Nothing to Say", was listed on CCM Magazine's list of the Top 10 albums of 2000.

Peterson's second album, Clear to Venus, was released on September 11, 2001.

In 2003, Peterson released Love and Thunder. It featured Alison Krauss, Cliff Young and Randall Goodgame and was produced by Dove Award-winning Christian music veteran Steve Hindalong. Also in 2003, Peterson read narration for the audio version of Ray Blackston's novel Flabbergasted, and Caedmon's Call recorded "Mystery of Mercy", a song Peterson co-wrote with Randall Goodgame, for their album Back Home.

In 2004, Peterson's song "Family Man", from the album Love and Thunder, was nominated in the category "Country Recorded Song of the Year" for the 35th Annual Dove Awards. Peterson also released a Christmas album, Behold the Lamb of God: The True Tall Tale of the Coming of Christ. Since the holiday season of 2001, Peterson and a wide variety of fellow Nashville area musicians have gone on tour playing the songs from the album, culminating in an annual performance in Nashville's Ryman Auditorium. Peterson recorded a new edition of the album that was released on October 25, 2019.

In 2005, Peterson released The Far Country and Appendix A: Bootlegs and B Sides.

In 2006, Peterson worked with his friend Randall Goodgame to release Slugs & Bugs & Lullabies, a children's album. The album produced two tracks which were featured on the newest video in the bestselling VeggieTales series called The Wonderful Wizard of Ha's. Peterson sang the song "Arise, Arise" on Songs from the Voice, Vol. 2: Son of the Most High, a compilation album produced by Don Chaffer of Waterdeep. That same year, Michael Card recorded Peterson's song "The Silence of God" for his album The Hidden Face of God. Peterson appeared on Card's radio show on numerous occasions.

In 2007, Peterson independently released Appendix M: Media / Music / Movies, an EP containing live versions, original demos, and rarities. Later that year, Randy Travis recorded Peterson's "Labor of Love" for his 2007 Christmas album Songs of the Season.

In July 2008, Peterson signed with the Christian label Centricity Music. On October 21, 2008, Peterson released Resurrection Letters, Volume Two, a collection of songs about what the resurrection of Jesus Christ means for people today. The album reached No. 9 on Billboard's Top Christian Albums chart.

In August 2010 Peterson released Counting Stars, which debuted at No. 7 on Billboard's Top Christian Albums chart. His single from the album, "Dancing in the Minefields", reached No. 13 on Billboard's Top Christian Songs chart and stayed on the chart for 19 weeks.

On August 24, 2012 Andrew released the album Light for the Lost Boy to critical acclaim, due to a fuller band sound which maintains his depth of lyrical content.

In October 2016, Peterson released The Burning Edge of Dawn, which includes a song sung with his daughter Skye.

Peterson released a five-song EP, Resurrection Letters: Prologue, in February 2018, as a follow-up to Resurrection Letters, Volume 2. On March 30, Resurrection Letters, Volume One was released. This album contained "Is He Worthy?" written by Peterson and Ben Shive, which was covered on Chris Tomlin's Holy Roar album on September 28, 2018.

== Writing ==
In 2007, Andrew Peterson published The Ballad of Matthew's Begats with illustrator Cory Godbey. It is a children's book based on the song of the same name from Peterson's annual Christmas show, Behold the Lamb of God: The True Tall Tale of the Coming of Christ.

Peterson also wrote a four-book series of fantasy/adventure novels for young adults entitled The Wingfeather Saga published by Waterbrook Press, a subsidiary of Random House and Rabbit Room Press. The first novel, On the Edge of the Dark Sea of Darkness, was released March 18, 2008. The second novel in the series, North! Or Be Eaten, winner of the 2010 Christy Award for Young Adult Fiction, was released on August 18, 2009, and the third novel in the series, The Monster in the Hollows, was released in May 2011. The series concluded with The Warden and the Wolf King, and won the 2015 Clive Staples Award for Imaginative Fiction. This novel was funded successfully through Kickstarter in August 2013 and was released in July 2014.

The Wingfeather Saga is being adapted into an animated television series by Angel Studios. In 2016, a Kickstarter campaign funded a pilot episode which was released in 2017 as a short film. An equity crowdfunding effort was launched in 2021 and raised $5 million to produce the first season of the series, which was first aired in December 2022. Peterson is a producer of the series.

In 2019, Peterson published Adorning the Dark: Thoughts on Community, Calling, and the Mystery of Making, a semi-autobiographical work. The book earned "Book of the Year" honors from Christianity Today and World.

== Musical style ==
Peterson plays in the vein of a folk, rock, bluegrass, country, blues, and pop musician, while to a lesser extent rock and roll, where this enables him to play Christian pop, Christian rock, folk rock, roots rock, and country gospel styles and genres of music.

== Discography ==
=== Albums ===
Year	Album	Type	Peak positions		
Year	Album	Type	US	US Christ	SWE
1996	Walk	Studio	—	—	—
2000	Carried Along	Studio	—	32	—
2001	Clear to Venus	Studio	—	27	—
2003	Love and Thunder	Studio	—	38	—
2004	Behold the Lamb of God	Studio; Christmas album	—	—	—
2005	The Far Country	Studio	—	—	—
2006	Appendix A: Bootlegs and B Sides	Compilation (includes live tracks)	—	—	—
2006	Slugs & Bugs & Lullabies (credited to Andrew Peterson and Randall Goodgame)	Studio	—	—	—
2007	Appendix M: Media / Music / Movies	EP	—	—	—
2008	Resurrection Letters, Volume Two	Studio	128	9	—
2009	Appendix C: Live with the Captains Courageous	Live	—	—	—
2010	Counting Stars	Studio	123	7	—
2011	Above These City Lights	Live	—	7	—
2012	Light for the Lost Boy	Studio	125	8	54
2014	After All These Years: A Collection	Compilation	—	28	—
2015	The Burning Edge of Dawn	Studio	97	3	—
2018	Resurrection Letters: Prologue (EP)	Studio EP	—	17	—
2018	Resurrection Letters: Volume 1	Studio	126	4	—
2019	Behold the Lamb of God: 15th Anniversary Edition	Studio; Christmas album	—	39	—
2025	A Liturgy, a Legacy, & the Songs of Rich Mullins (Live)	Live	—	—	—

=== Singles ===
(Selective singles and videos)

- 2000: "Nothing to Say"
- 2004: "Family Man"
- 2010: "Dancing in the Minefields" (peaked at No. 13 on Billboard's Top Christian Songs chart)
- 2012: "Rest Easy"
- 2014: "After All These Years"
- 2018: "Is He Worthy?"

=== Video ===
- 2005: Behold the Lamb of God Live (DVD)

== Books ==
- 2007: The Ballad of Matthew's Begats
- 2008: On the Edge of the Dark Sea of Darkness: The Wingfeather Saga, Book One
- 2009: North! Or Be Eaten: The Wingfeather Saga, Book Two
- 2011: The Monster in the Hollows: The Wingfeather Saga, Book Three
- 2014: The Warden and the Wolf King: The Wingfeather Saga, Book Four
- 2014: Pembrick's Creaturepedia (Illustrated by Aedan Peterson)(The Wingfeather Saga Spinoff)
- 2016: Wingfeather Tales (editor)(anthology)
- 2019: Adorning the Dark (nonfiction/memoir)
- 2021: The God of the Garden (nonfiction/memoir)
- 2023: A Ranger's Guide to Glipwood Forest (The Wingfeather Saga spinoff)

== Awards ==
GMA Dove Awards

Year	Nominee	Award	Result
2004	"Family Man"	Country Recorded Song of the Year	Nominated
2004	City on a Hill: The Gathering	Special Event Album of the Year	Nominated
2013	Light for the Lost Boy	Inspirational Album of the Year	Nominated
2013	Light for the Lost Boy (Special Edition)	Recorded Music Packaging of the Year	Nominated
2015	After All These Years	Recorded Music Packaging of the Year	Nominated
2016	The Burning Edge of Dawn	Inspirational Album of the Year	Nominated
2018	Resurrection Letters Volume 1	Recorded Music Packaging of the Year	Nominated
2019	"Is He Worthy?"	Inspirational Recorded Song of the Year	Nominated
2020	Behold the Lamb of God (15th Anniversary)	Recorded Music Packaging of the Year	Nominated
2020	Behold the Lamb of God (15th Anniversary)	Christmas/Special Event Album of the Year	Nominated
2021	Behold the Lamb of God	Musical/Choral Collection	Won
