= The Arcadian Wild =

American folk newgrass band

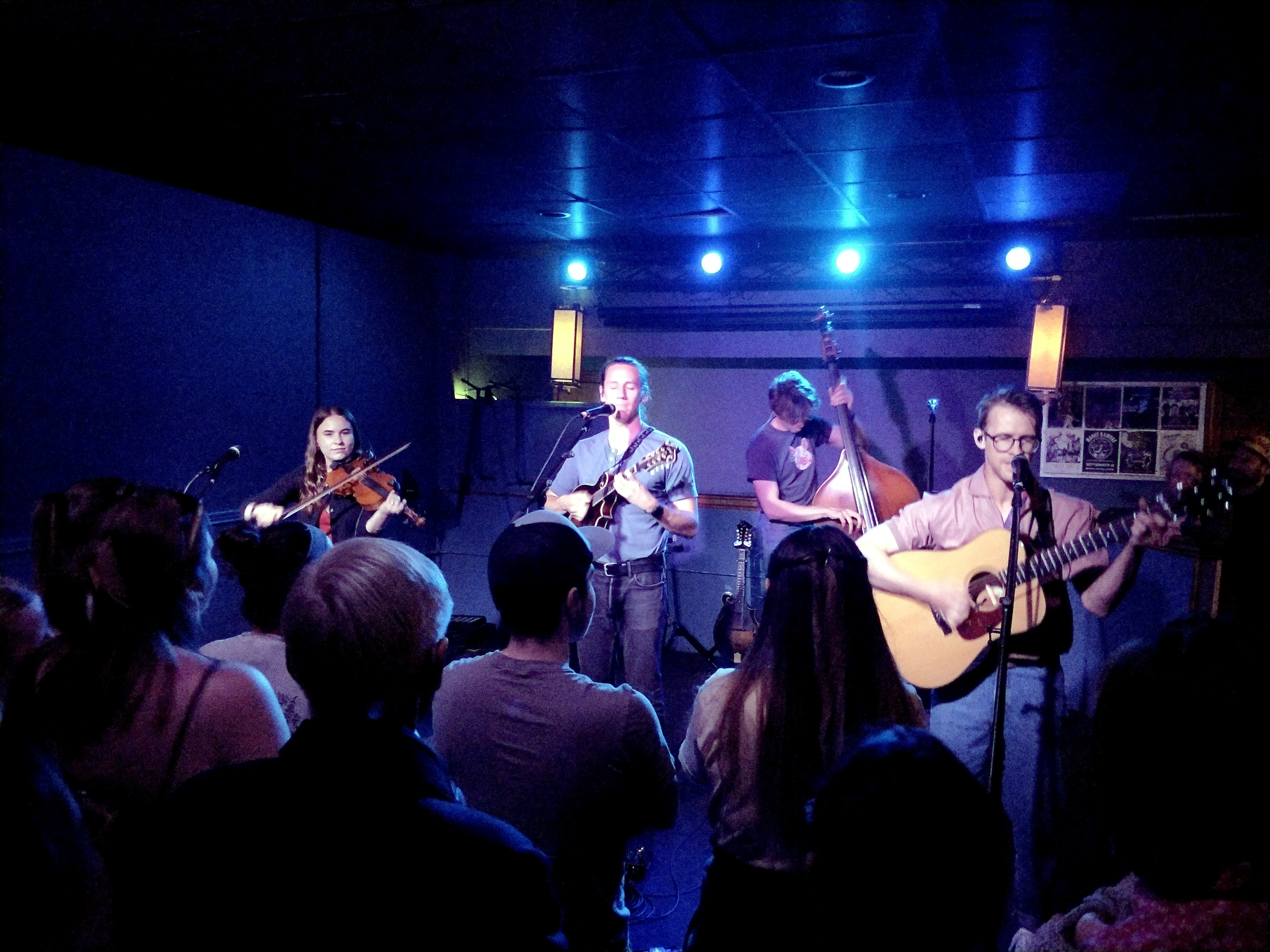
- The Arcadian Wild performing in Cleveland, OH in 2025

Background information
- Origin: Lipscomb University, Nashville, Tennessee
- Genres: folk; bluegrass
- Years active: 2013–present
- Labels: Vohnic Music LLC; AntiFragile Music
- Members: Lincoln Mick; Isaac Horn; Bailey Warren
- Website: www.thearcadianwild.com

The Arcadian Wild is an American acoustic string band based in Nashville, Tennessee. It began as a collaboration between friends at college in 2013 and has included several different members over the years. It has played and recorded with its current lineup since early 2020.

== Background ==
The band was formed in the fall of 2013 by choir students at Lipscomb University. The original members were Lincoln Mick, Isaac Horn, Sarah Wood, and Everett Davis. Following a series of lineup changes during the band’s first six years of work, fiddler Bailey Warren joined Horn and Mick in 2020.

As of July 2026, the band has released three full-length records, five extended plays, and multiple singles.

== Current members ==
- Lincoln Mick
- Isaac Horn
- Bailey Warren
- Erik Coveney
- Eli Broxham

== Former members ==
- Everett Davis
- Sarah Wood a.k.a Juniper Vale (member 2013–2017)
- Machaela Nesler
- Paige Park

== Discography ==
Studio albums

- The Arcadian Wild (August 2015)
- Finch in the Pantry (May 3, 2019, AntiFragile Music)
- Welcome (July 21, 2023)
- Welcome (reframed) (July 19, 2024)
- Make it out Alive (2026)

EPs

- The Colorado EP (May 16, 2014)
- Wander. Wonder. (2018, Vohnic Music)
- Principium (February 5, 2021)
- Covered: Beneath Another Sky (October 29, 2021)
- Happy Golden Days (November 1, 2024)
