= Emmet Swimming =

American rock band

- Origin: Fairfax, Virginia, U.S.
- Genre: Rock
- Years active: 1991–present
- Labels: Screaming Goddess, Epic
- Members: Todd Watts; Erik Wenberg; Scott Brotemarkle; Tamer Eid
- Past members: Jim McNabb; Eric Kreinar; John Alexander; Rob Shaw; Luke Michel
- Website: emmetswimming.com

Emmet Swimming (who write their name as "emmet swimming") is a rock band from Fairfax, Virginia that was formed in 1990 at George Mason University. The band's name is a misspelled reference to Emmett Till, who died after being shot and thrown into a river. "The idea of the name was basically that a 14-year-old boy should be swimming in the river, not dying in it," said singer/founder Todd Watts. "Emmet Swimming" is also the name of an early song the band wrote. The band recently sold out (1,200 tickets) their performance at the 930 Club celebrating their 30th show at the club which puts them in the top 7 of bands that have ever played there.

They are known for their extensive touring. Regularly sold-out performances at the Fairfax live-music staples Planet NOVA, TT Reynolds and Fat Tuesday's drew major record label attention culminating in a deal with Epic/Sony and the band continuously toured for over seven years, performing 200–300 shows per year. They played on the 1998 H.O.R.D.E. tour, and have also played and toured with Dave Matthews Band and Barenaked Ladies.

They still regularly play venues such as the 9:30 Club (including a show there in the summer of 2018 that sold out in 2 days) in Washington, DC and the Tally Ho Theater in Leesburg, VA. Their shows regularly achieve high attendance. The band has sold over 250,000 albums and has been nominated for 14 Washington Area Music Awards (WAMMIES).

== Band members ==
=== Current members ===
- Todd Watts – vocals, guitar
- Erik Wenberg – guitar, vocals
- Scott Brotemarkle (Therm) – bass guitar
- Tamer Eid – drums

=== Former members ===
- Jim McNabb – bass guitar
- John Alexander – guitar
- Rob Shaw – bass guitar
- Luke Michel – bass guitar
- Derrick Decker – drums

== Discography ==
=== Studio albums ===
- this kid walks into a bar... (2013)
- Bathing in the New Economy (EP) (2003)
- Big Night Without You (Epic/Sony) (1998)
- Arlington to Boston (Epic/Sony) (1996)
- wake (Epic/Sony) (1995)
- wake (1994)
- dark when the snow falls (1993)

=== Live albums ===
- Earplugs 50¢ (1999)
