= Andrew Osenga =

American singer-songwriter

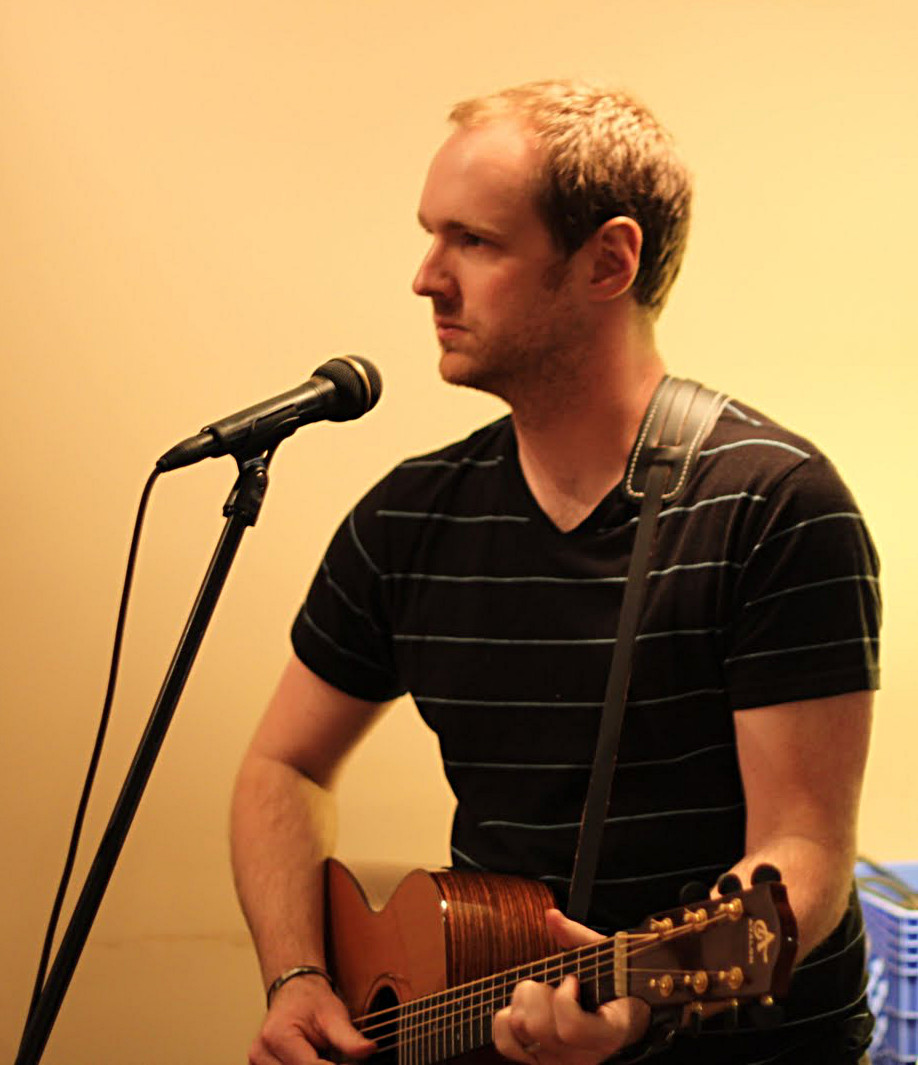

Background information
- Genres: Singer-songwriter, folk, alternative rock
- Occupations: Singer, songwriter, producer
- Website: AndrewOsenga.com

Andrew Osenga is an American singer-songwriter, rock musician, and author. He also writes, produces, engineers and plays guitar for other artists. Formerly the lead singer of The Normals, who broke up in 2003 for financial and family reasons, Osenga currently pursues a solo career. He is also a former member of the band Caedmon's Call; he had taken over as vocalist/guitarist while Derek Webb was gone from the band. In 2006, Osenga co-founded the Square Peg Alliance along with 12 other independent Nashville artists. In 2014, Osenga worked for Capitol Records in the A&R department of their Christian music division.

== Discography ==
=== The Normals ===
- Better Than This (1998)
- Coming To Life (2000)
- A Place Where You Belong (2002)
- Happy Christmas Vol. 2 (1999 compilation)

=== Caedmon's Call ===
- Share the Well (2004)
- In the Company of Angels II: The World Will Sing (2006)
- Overdressed (2007)

=== Solo ===
- Photographs (2002)
- Souvenirs & Postcards (2004)
- Photographs (re-released 2006)
- The Morning (2006)
- Letters to the Editor, Vol. 1 (2007)
- Letters to the Editor, Vol. 2 (2008)
- Choosing Sides (2009)
- Crooked Creek Songs (2010)
- Leonard, the Lonely Astronaut (2012)
- Heart EP (2015)
- Soul EP (2015)
- Flesh EP (2015)
- Bone EP (2016)
- The Painted Desert (2018)
- Ambient Guitar, Vol. 1 (2024)
- Headwaters (2024)
- Hold The Light (2025)

=== Also appearing on ===
- Andrew Peterson: Love and Thunder (2003; songwriter and musician)
- Andrew Peterson: Behold the Lamb of God (2004; co-producer, engineer and musician)
- Andrew Peterson: The Far Country (2005; engineer and musician)
