= The Normals (Christian band) =

American Christian rock band

- Origin: Normal, Illinois, U.S.
- Genres: Christian alternative rock; punk rock; alternative
- Years active: 1998–2002
- Label: ForeFront
- Past members: Andrew Osenga; Mark Lockett; Clayton Daily; B.J. Aberle; Cason Cooley; Mike Taquino; Steve Hindalong

The Normals were a Christian alternative rock band formed in 1998 by Andrew Osenga, Mark Lockett, and Clayton Daily. The name of the band honors their hometown of Normal, Illinois. The band's lineup also included B.J. Aberle, Cason Cooley, Mike Taquino, and Steve Hindalong. The Normals released three albums with ForeFront Records and garnered two GMA Dove Award nominations before disbanding in 2002.

== History ==
Outside of The Normals, Cooley worked as a songwriter and producer, and has worked with artists such as Matthew Perryman Jones, Katie Herzig, and Trent Dabbs. Cooley is also known for his work on Ben Rector's album Brand New, as well as Ingrid Michaelson's albums Lights Out and It Doesn't Have to Make Sense.

== Discography ==
- Better Than This (1998)
- Coming to Life (2000)
- A Place Where You Belong (2002)
