= Randall Goodgame =

American singer-songwriter

- Origin: Nashville, Tennessee, U.S.
- Genres: Singer-songwriter, contemporary Christian music
- Occupations: Singer, songwriter
- Label: Independent
- Website: randallgoodgame.com

Randall Kilpatrick Goodgame (born February 15, 1974) is an American singer-songwriter of contemporary Christian music and the creative force behind the family music brand, Slugs & Bugs. Goodgame has recorded eight solo albums and contributed to numerous others. He has written songs for Caedmon's Call, Andrew Peterson, Jason Gray, Jill Phillips, and Eric Peters. He is also a frequent collaborator of Andrew Peterson, including the 2006 music album, Slugs & Bugs & Lullabies. From this album, the song "You Can Always Come Home" was featured on the VeggieTales' The Wonderful Wizard of Ha's (2007).

== Early life ==
Randall Goodgame is the son of surgeon John T. Goodgame, Jr. and his wife, Beth Goodgame, of Clearwater, Florida. When he was nine years old, he began taking piano lessons along with his older brother and younger sister. At age 15, he began studying under blind Brazilian pianist Manfredo Fest. He began performing for local charity events, including fundraisers for Clearwater's Morton Plant Hospital. While in high school, he performed with the Clearwater High Jazz Band, was captain of the swim team, and participated in the Student Government Association. He graduated from Clearwater High School in 1992.

As a freshman studying music and biology at Birmingham–Southern College, Goodgame won the Jazz Holiday scholarship, awarded by the Clearwater Jazz Holiday festival. He later changed his major to English, reasoning that the exposure to various literary genres would improve his songwriting. On weekends and vacations from college, Goodgame was the keyboardist for the Southern rock Black Creek Band, which released an album entitled Live from Gainesville during his tenure. From February to August 1995, he toured the Southeastern United States with the band before returning to Birmingham-Southern to finish his degree. A paper about his experience on the road became part of his senior project.

== Early music career ==
"This Nashville-recorded troubadour's calling card is a superb self-made CD that's full of memorable melodies, stirring production, ear-catching lyrics and personable vocals. Think Paul Simon/Billy Joel in an acoustic setting. Highly recommended. 'Drop the needle' anyplace on the CD."

— Robert K. Oermann, MusicRow.

In December 1995, Goodgame released his eponymous first album, Randall Goodgame. Except for one track – a cover of Bob Dylan's I'll Be Your Baby Tonight – Goodgame composed the music and lyrics to all ten songs on the album. In addition to performing the lead vocals, Goodgame also played the piano, acoustic guitar, harmonica, accordion and mandolin on the album. Other performers accompanied him on the bass guitar and percussion instruments. Released on Goodgame's own label, Redfish Records, much of the recording was done at Cliff Downs' studio in Nashville, Tennessee, but portions were recorded at Panda Studios in Clearwater. Writing in MusicRow, Robert K. Oermann called Goodgame the "folkie find of the day" and called his debut album "a superb self-made CD that's full of memorable melodies, stirring production, ear-catching lyrics and personable vocal".

After graduating from Birmingham-Southern in May 1996, Goodgame moved to Nashville. Goodgame's cousin brought a copy of Randall Goodgame to a disc jockey at WCHZ-FM in Augusta, Georgia. After receiving positive listener responses to the song "Momma Louise", the DJ invited Goodgame and his newly formed Randall Goodgame Band to play at a South by Southwest Music Festival in Augusta in October 1996. Goodgame released his second album, Arkadelphia, in 2000, the same year he performed his first show in his hometown of Clearwater.

== Christian music career ==
Goodgame eventually began writing songs for contemporary Christian artists such as Caedmon's Call, Jason Gray, and The Midtown Project. In 2001, he opened for Andrew Peterson, and in 2003, he joined Caedmon's Call and Jars of Clay on tour. He wrote seven of the songs on Caedmon's Call's 2004 album Share the Well. Also in 2004, Goodgame opened for Dove Award winner Ginny Owens' 15-state tour.

In 2007, Goodgame collaborated with Peterson to release a children's album, Slugs & Bugs & Lullabies. The album's popularity led to him being invited to compose songs for the Christian-themed cartoon series VeggieTales. Goodgame continued the Slugs & Bugs brand with A Slugs & Bugs Christmas in 2010 and Slugs & Bugs Under Where? in 2011. He has also released a Slugs & Bugs-themed curriculum for Vacation Bible School and does live performances as part of the Slugs and Bugs LIVE series. An April 2015 Parents Life review of Goodgame's Sing the Bible with Slugs & Bugs – which features 18 tracks of direct Bible quotations set to music, said the album "possesses a high-quality artistic sensibility that few children's CDs maintain", adding that the songs would "have kids memorizing Scripture in no time". The album was one of five nominees for Children's Music Album of the Year at the 47th Annual Dove Awards in 2015. Goodgame went on to release five "Sing the Bible" albums, featuring quotations from the Bible set to music.

At an October 11, 2024, concert in Franklin, Tennessee, Goodgame released the Scripture Hymnal containing 106 songs that are word-for-word scripture quotations from the New International Version, English Standard Version, and Christian Standard Bible set to music. Goodgame collaborated with 12 other songwriters to compose the hymnal.
