= Andy Gullahorn =

American Christian musician

- Born: Austin, Texas
- Origin: Nashville, Tennessee
- Genres: Folk, CCM, folk rock
- Occupations: Singer, songwriter, music producer
- Instruments: vocals, singer-songwriter
- Years active: 1998–present
- Website: andygullahorn.com

Andrew Gullahorn is an American Christian musician and music producer, who plays a folk rock style of Christian pop. He has released six studio albums, Old Hat in 1999, Room to Breathe in 2005, Reinventing the Wheel in 2007, The Law of Gravity in 2009, Beyond the Frame in 2013, Fault Lines in 2016, and Everything as It Should Be in 2018. His next album, Winning Streak, releases on June 6, 2025. He was a winner at the Kerrville Folk Festival in 2010.

== Early and personal life ==
Andrew Gullahorn was born in Austin, Texas, He went to college at Belmont University in Nashville, Tennessee, where he presently resides with his wife, Jill Phillips.

== Music career ==
His music recording career started in 1998, with the studio album, Old Hat, that was released in 1999. The subsequent studio album, Room to Breathe, was released in 2005. He released, Reinventing the Wheel, on November 20, 2007. His fourth studio album, The Law of Gravity, was released on November 17, 2009. The most recent studio album, Beyond the Frame, was released on August 12, 2013. Gullahorn was chosen as a winner at the Kerrville Folk Festival in 2010.

== Discography ==
Studio albums

- Old Hat (1999)
- Room to Breathe (2005)
- Reinventing the Wheel (2007)
- The Law of Gravity (2009)
- Beyond the Frame (2013)
- Fault Lines (2016)
- Everything As It Should Be (2018)
- Winning Streak (2025)
