= Jill Phillips =

American singer-songwriter

- Also known as: Jill Gullahorn
- Born: Jill Anne Phillips; February 15, 1976 (age 50); Chesapeake, Virginia
- Origin: Nashville, Tennessee
- Genres: CCM, folk, folk rock, roots rock
- Occupations: Singer, songwriter
- Years active: 1998–present
- Labels: Fervent, Word
- Website: jillphillips.com

Jill Anne Gullahorn (née, Phillips; born February 15, 1976) is an American Christian musician based out of Nashville, Tennessee, who brings a folk rock and roots rock sound with contemporary Christian music themes.

== Early and personal life ==
Phillips was born, Jill Anne Phillips, on February 15, 1976, in Chesapeake, Virginia, whose father was Roy Donell "Donnie" Phillips and mother is Karen Korbach Phillips, where she was raised with her brother, Matthew Scott Phillips. She is married to Andy Gullahorn, where they presently reside in Nashville, Tennessee, with their children.

== Music history ==
Phillips got her start in a music career when she graduated from Belmont University in 1998. Her first, self-titled album was produced by Grammy-award winning Wayne Kirkpatrick who has produced for such artists as Amy Grant, Garth Brooks, and Susan Ashton. Kirkpatrick said that it was "the honesty of her [Phillips'] songs, the charm of her voice, and the strength of her character that drew me to her as an artist – I knew that being involved with someone like that would be time well spent." Following the release of first album, Phillips toured with Caedmon's Call and Bebo Norman.

Soon Phillips made her jump from the sidelines by recording her next album, God and Money, independently. This album became her biggest break into the CCM industry and was raved by CCM Magazine as reader's choice for Independent Artist of the Year in 2002.

In 2003 Phillips was signed by Fervent Records and she released her third album, Writing on the Wall, on which she collaborated with many other artists, including Andrew Peterson, Bebo Norman and Stephen Mason of Jars of Clay.

In 2005, Phillips released a speciality album called Kingdom Come and recorded her fifth album Nobody's Got It All Together, which was released in early 2006.

In 2006, Phillips founded the Square Peg Alliance with 12 other independent Christian artists to cross-promote each other's music.

== Discography ==
- Jill Phillips (1999)
- God & Money (2002)
- Writing on the Wall (2003)
- Kingdom Come (2005)
- Nobody's Got It All Together (2006)
- The Good Things (2008)
- Christmas (2010)
- In This Hour (2011)
- Mortar & Stone (2014)
- Lead Me Home (2016)
- Deeper Into Love (2022)
