= Ben Shive =

American Christian musician (born 1979)

- Born: Benjamin Aaron Shive; September 26, 1979 (age 46); St. Louis, Missouri
- Origin: Nashville, Tennessee
- Genres: CCM, Christian rock, folk, folk rock, pop rock
- Occupations: Singer, songwriter, keyboardist, music producer, arranger
- Instruments: Vocals, keyboards
- Years active: 2008–present
- Website: benshive.com

Benjamin Aaron Shive (born September 26, 1979) is an American Christian musician, keyboardist, arranger, and music producer, who mainly plays acoustic Christian pop and folk rock music. He has released two studio albums, The Ill-Tempered Klavier in 2008 and The Cymbal Crashing Clouds in 2011. He is a GMA Dove Award-winning music producer, for his production on Christmas Is Here from Brandon Heath.

== Early and personal life ==
Shive was born on September 26, 1979, in St. Louis, Missouri, the son of a scientist. He has a brother, Joshua. He eventually relocated to Nashville, Tennessee, where he attended Belmont University to study music, while he was there he produced his first album. His second album produced was Behold the Lamb of God from Andrew Peterson. He has played three-times at the Grand Ole Opry. He is married to Beth Shive and together they have a daughter, Lucy.

== Music career ==
His music career started in 2008, with the studio album, The Ill-Tempered Klavier, that was released on June 17, 2008, where Christianity Today rates the album five stars, stating, it "can't be recommended more highly, a rewarding and introspective listen from start to finish." He released, The Cymbal Crashing Clouds, on September 26, 2011, while Christianity Today rates the album four stars, writing, "His lyrics are wildly creative; attentive listeners will pick up some clear nods to the biblical prophets, lending gravity to a transporting collection of songs." The song, "Listen!", was reviewed by The Sound Opinion, where they say, "There are diamonds out there, like this song, and diamond cutters, like Ben Shive." He was awarded the GMA Dove Award for Christmas Album of the Year in 2014, for his production on the 2013 album Christmas Is Here by Brandon Heath.

== Discography ==
Studio albums

- The Ill-Tempered Klavier (June 17, 2008)
- The Cymbal Crashing Clouds (September 26, 2011)
