= The Penderwicks (series) =

Children's book series by Jeanne Birdsall

- The Penderwicks (2005); The Penderwicks on Gardam Street (2008); The Penderwicks at Point Mouette (2011); The Penderwicks in Spring (2015); The Penderwicks at Last (2018)
- Author: Jeanne Birdsall
- Language: English
- Publisher: Knopf
- No. of books: 5

The Penderwicks is a children's book series by American author Jeanne Birdsall. The series consists of five books: The Penderwicks (2005), The Penderwicks on Gardam Street (2008), The Penderwicks at Point Mouette (2011), The Penderwicks in Spring (2015), and The Penderwicks at Last (2018).

== Characters ==
=== Main characters ===
- Rosalind Penderwick - A caring, responsible 12-year-old as of Book 1, Rosalind, as the eldest sibling, has looked after the family since her beloved mother died four years prior. Rosalind, in more than one way, acts as the parent-like sibling to all of her sisters (particularly to Batty) and usually is the voice of reason among the sisters. However, throughout the first book, she tries to figure out her true feelings for Cagney, the gardener at Arundel Hall. Rosalind is prone to worrying and misses Mrs. Penderwick a lot. Her sisters say that she still cries in her sleep sometimes. She often is the one who calls the MOOPS (Meeting of Older Penderwick Sisters) and the MOPS (Meeting of Penderwick Sisters). She enjoys baking, and speaking on the phone with her best friend, Anna, and is also quite skilled at basketball. She begins dating her neighbor Tommy Geiger several months after her thirteenth birthday in April. In book four, Rosalind is in college, and has stopped dating Tommy Geiger, instead coming home with a fellow student, Oliver. Everyone dislikes Oliver, and Rosalind eventually breaks up with him and she and Tommy start dating again. In the fifth book, Rosalind and Tommy are getting married at Arundel.
- Skye Penderwick - A tempered, energetic, and witty 11-year-old as of Book 1, Skye is vastly different from her sisters, most notably in appearance. With straight blonde hair and blue eyes, Skye resembles her mother (her other sisters have brown curly hair and brown eyes), but does not consider herself able to match her mother's beauty. She is fiercely loyal to her friends and family. Being the most outrageous and tomboyish of the group, Skye is often at odds with her sisters for their more "feminine" likes. Skye plays soccer and enjoys playing the sport with her sister Jane and her friend Jeffery which the Penderwicks meet in the first book. She is most awkward with Batty, for Skye is not much with babies and kids. Skye often seeks Rosalind's advice on matters such as temper and feelings and is excellent at math (she knew long division by second grade, and is excused from her sixth-grade math class so she could teach herself geometry in the library). She is also described as being an abominable musician, with her clarinet lessons having been canceled when a neighbor complained. She plans to become an astrophysicist as a career, and during her trip to Point Mouette brought her favorite book Death by Black Holes. In book four, Skye is trying to convince Jefferey to stop trying to date her, and during one of her conversations with him, mentions that her mother died because of Batty, causing Batty's emotional turmoil in the rest of the book. In the fifth book, she is dating Dusko Dušek, a Czech marine biologist, and is eventually persuaded to turn the Arundel wedding into a double one, she is marrying at the same time as Rosalind and Tommy.
- Jane Penderwick - A dreamy and artistic 10-year-old as of Book 1 who works to be a famous and respected author, Jane has already begun writing a series of short books, following a heroine Sabrina Starr as she rescues various animals, and later people. Jane often confuses life with fantasy, getting lost in her fanciful imagination which sometimes bothers Skye. In addition to Sabrina Starr, Jane possesses an alter ego, Mick Hart, a rough-mouthed British character who keeps her from crying during soccer games. She and Skye are the closest of the four sisters, although they often rub each other the wrong way because of their vastly different personalities (exemplified by their room at home, in which Skye's half is kept tidy and white while Jane's is painted lavender and perpetually cluttered). Her writing style often incorporates items from past literature and legends, and she supposedly hates revising, choosing instead to maintain her original ideas. Her writing process is followed throughout the series, as she completes a Sabrina Starr book in each Penderwicks novel; she also writes a play, "Sisters and Sacrifice", which, though written while switching homework assignments with Skye, is chosen as the sixth-grade play. She is completely dedicated to writing, saying that she will perhaps never marry, unless she'll find a man who likes to cook and clean. In the fifth book, Jane is not writing a Sabrina Starr book, but a novel about a time-traveling female detective called Philippa de Nel and an art forger, including a side romance with the artist Pieter de Hooch. Furthermore, Batty's ex-boyfriend, the artist Wesley, predicts, when he's leaving, that Jane will probably write 5 books in a series.
- Elizabeth Penderwick (Batty) - The youngest child, Batty is a very innocent and very shy 4-year-old as of Book 1 who is a great lover of animals and her family. Batty always asks Rosalind to tell her a story about their mother almost every night at bedtime. She is very fond of Hound, the family dog, as he is of her, and is also fond of Cagney's rabbits, Yaz and Carla, and visits them almost every day to give them carrots. She almost always hides behind her sisters when she meets a new person and, for the first book, always wore orange-and-black dress-up butterfly wings, for an unknown reason. During the second book, she befriends Ben, the toddler who had recently moved next door, often spying on "Bug Man" with him. During her summer at Point Mouette, she is taught music by Jeffrey and proves to be a very able musician. In the Fifth book, she is stated to be attending college in Boston studying singing.
- Jeffrey Tifton - An only child who turns 11 during the first book, Jeffrey led a largely contented if dull, life before meeting the Penderwicks, as he lived in a grand estate called Arundel Hall with a kind housekeeper, Churchie, to care for him. His father had left him before he was born, and Jeffrey initially does not know anything about him. Jeffrey had suffered the loss of his grandfather, a well-known general, however, Jeffrey, is an immensely talented musician, who plays piano, clarinet, and a little cello. He wants to be a musician and vehemently protests this fate. With the aid of the Penderwicks, he manages to tell them his opinions and eventually enrolls at the Welborn-Hughes boarding school in Boston while taking private lessons at the New England Conservatory. His musical ability is later revealed to come from his father, whom he meets at Point Mouette. His birthday is August 8. In book four he has a crush on Skye and keeps trying to get her to date him, which she refuses to do because she doesn't want to give up her friendship with him and wants to focus on studying. He eventually gets over it, and in the fifth book is hinted at having feelings for Batty.
- Ben Penderwick - He's an energetic and sarcastic red-haired boy, the only male kid in the family. Iantha's son and the Penderwicks step-brother. He is obsessed with making movies and forcing his younger sister Lydia to play in them. He was just one-year-old in The Penderwicks on Gardam Street and The Penderwicks at Point Mouette, Seven in The Penderwicks in Spring, and 16 in The Penderwicks at Last. He has a best friend names Rafael that he loves playing action figures with and making alien movies. In his movies, he always makes Lydia die. Ben looks up to Nick Geiger, thinking he's the coolest for being in the military and learning the military alphabet and learning all about the military with his best friend Rafael. He's absolutely disgusted by the idea of ever having a girlfriend and refuses to listen to anyone who says he should date Remy, Tess, or Nora. He makes friends with people and becomes close with them easily, he's one of the most social Penderwicks. Though he hasn't known Jeffery as long as his older sisters, they're still pretty close. Ben jokes, saying, he'd marry Jeffery for his money. He wishes he had brothers instead of five sisters sometimes, saying he wished Tommy and Nick were his brothers. When Batty thinks she killed her mom and Hound and is experiencing serious problems, Ben's super worried and tells his best friend Rafael, who comes up with a ton of unlikely stories, like that she was bitten by a tsetse fly and has sleeping sickness or that she was abducted by aliens. Batty then tells Ben she tried to run away to Boston to see Jeffery and tells him to keep it a secret on the Penderwick family honor. Mr. Penderwick guesses after interviewing Ben, who was trying his hardest to not say anything. Once his dad found out, Ben started to sob, saying he hates secrets. In the fifth book, he helps Alice and Lydia make a movie to make Jack, Alice's brother, jealous. He chooses an alien movie and Alice gets really invested, thinking Ben's really cool. Ben's a complete child at heart, not taking anything except maybe movie making and keeping secrets too seriously. He loves making sarcastic comebacks and fun jokes. He and his best friend Rafael plan on moving to Hollywood and becoming famous movie directors together, and they still have that dream to this day. Ben and Rafael are the only friendship still confirmed in the last book, not confirming Keiko and Batty, Rosalind and Anna, and Jane and Artie and Molly.
- Lydia Penderwick - the youngest Penderwick (as of book 4). The daughter of Mr. Penderwick and Iantha and the Penderwick sisters' half-sister. Not much is known about her character because she is only 2 years old in the fourth book, but she is the central character in book five, being 11 years old. She loves to dance, admiring Fred Astaire and Swan Lake, and hates the fact that her family thinks she likes everyone without exception. She also dislikes Ben's forcing her into being the main character in his movies, who invariably dies at the end. She befriends Cagney's children Alice (10 years) and Jack (12 years). It is thought that she marries Jack after their run into each other in the tunnel.

=== Supporting characters ===
==== Penderwick family ====
- Martin Penderwick - The head of the Penderwick household, he is a very loving and caring, if often absentminded, father and always forgets where his glasses are. A professor of botany at Cameron University, he frequently uses Latin in everyday speech, and also enjoys classical music, particularly opera. Following the loss of his first wife, Elizabeth, he is able to look after his four daughters well, yet he feels guilty that his eldest daughter Rosalind had taken over many of her mother's duties, being the one to advise and comfort her sisters. He marries next-door neighbor and colleague Iantha Aaronson in the second book, The Penderwicks on Gardam Street. He is largely absent from the third book.
- Elizabeth Penderwick - The mother of the sisters, she died from cancer shortly after Batty's birth, and thus is not present in any of the series. The only time she appears in the books (except for some occasional mentions made by the sisters) is in the prologue of ‘'The Penderwicks on Gardam Street.' With blond hair and blue eyes (like her daughter Skye), she is regarded by all the sisters to be beautiful. Shortly before her death, she writes a letter detailing her worries that Mr. Penderwick would be lonely after her death, and advises him to resume dating. This letter is delivered by Mr. Penderwick's sister Claire four years later, setting the second book's events in motion.
- Claire Penderwick - Mr. Penderwick's younger sister, she first made an appearance in The Penderwicks on Gardam Street, bringing a letter from the sisters' late mother that advised Martin resume dating. She takes great pains to find suitable matches for him. The following summer, she supervises the sisters at Point Mouette, yet she injures her ankle at the seawall and is subsequently on crutches. She is single, although she had numerous relationships in college, and spends much time at Point Mouette solving jigsaw puzzles with Turron. She lives in Connecticut, several hours away from the sisters' home at Cameron, but visits often. She ends up marrying Turron and has two children with him.
- Iantha Aaronson Penderwick - Having lost her first husband, Dan, in a car accident, she and her son Ben move into the house next to the Penderwicks'; she and Ben are the only people on Gardam Street with red hair. She is naturally shy, yet she gets to know the four sisters well, especially Batty, whose company Ben greatly enjoys. She is a professor of astrophysics at Cameron University, a profession which Skye greatly admires. For a brief period, an ex-colleague of hers, Norman, attempted to steal her research. After a while, she gets to know Mr. Penderwick better, and they start to date. It turns out that the whole dating idea that Mrs. Penderwick had, wasn't such a bad idea, and wasn't as torturous as Mr. Penderwick said it was, because not long after, Iantha and Mr. Penderwick get married.

==== Jeffrey's family, acquaintances ====
- Brenda Tifton - The mother of Jeffrey who is rude, cruel, and snobby toward the Penderwicks. Mrs. Tifton believes the Penderwick sisters to be vulgar (which she evaluated after Jeffrey's birthday dinner), and dislikes all of the sisters, although Jane seems to escape her criticism. During the first book, she is obsessed with winning a garden competition, in which she eventually takes second place after Jeffrey and the Penderwick sisters destroy a jasmine plant with a soccer ball. She marries Dexter Dupree, an equally snobby man, following the first book, and embarks on a worldwide honeymoon. She permits Jeffrey, at the last minute, to join the sisters at Point Mouette. In the final book it is said she has six ex-husbands, including Dexter Dupree.
- Alec McGrath - the Penderwicks' next door neighbor at Point Mouette, he earns Jeffrey's admiration because of his comprehensive music room (containing many instruments, including a grand piano). He also owns a dog, Hoover, who creates many problems for the Penderwicks, and primarily lives in Boston. After shaving his beard, it becomes apparent to Skye and Jane the similarity between him and Jeffrey, and eventually it is revealed that he is Jeffrey's long-lost father, a fact Jeffrey has extreme trouble with.
- Dexter Dupree - A publisher for a car magazine, "Lines on the Road". He also enjoys golfing, and has a prominent smirk (which makes its way onto Skye, Jane, and Jeffrey's archery target). These three children also name one of their soccer balls Dexter so they could kick him around (the other ball being named "Pencey Military Academy"). He marries Mrs. Tifton, and, in the third book, arrives at Point Mouette to try to take Jeffrey home.
- Mrs. Churchill ("Churchie") - The caring housekeeper at Arundel who "makes the best gingerbread in Massachusetts", she is described by the sisters as being "cozy". She helped the girls pick out suitable outfits from Mrs. Tifton's closet for Jeffrey's fancy birthday dinner (as Mrs. Tifton had too many dresses to keep track of). She has a daughter in Boston, as well as (presumably) several grandsons; as a result of her lack of granddaughters, she enjoys altering the sisters' party dresses to fit.
- Cagney - the gardener for Arundel Hall. He enjoys playing basketball and reading about the Civil War. His favorite snack is chocolate brownies and hot dogs you find at baseball games, and he owns two rabbits, Yaz and Carla. He is, according to Rosalind, very handsome. Rosalind initially estimates his age at "eighteen, maybe nineteen years old". He dates a girl named Kathleen, although they break up before the end of the first book. He begins teacher-training lessons several months after the Penderwicks' summer at Arundel. Jeanne Birdsall's dog, Cagney is named after him, not the other way around. He has two children, Alice and Jack. Lydia befriends his children.
- Harry "the Tomato Man" - an old man who sells tomatoes and is good friends with Churchie. He helps the Penderwicks find Arundel.
- Turron Asabere - a close friend of Alec, he visits Point Mouette from his regular home in New York and saves Jane, who had fallen down a rock by the sea and thought she had broken her nose. He is "terrified" by boats (to use his term) and spends much of his time at Point Mouette completing jigsaw puzzles with the injured Aunt Claire. He ends up marrying her and has two children.

==== Gardam Street ====
- Anna - Rosalind's best friend, with whom she shares all of her middle school classes. Anna is not directly in the first book, but Rosalind often makes references to her copious and strongly-opinionated advice, especially about Cagney. Her father had divorced and remarried countless times, to the extent that Anna resolves to call of her stepmothers "Claudia" (after the first one). She also spends much time with her mother. She plays a considerable role in arranging blind dates for Mr. Penderwick during the second book. She takes Rosalind on a vacation to New Jersey the following summer, resulting in both being absent from the third book.
- Tommy Geiger - a neighbor of the Penderwicks (he lives across the street from them), he is twelve as of his first appearance, and is thus in Rosalind's grade. He is an avid football player, wearing Cameron Middle School number 86, and works out in his spare time. He had played the starring role in his sixth grade performance (Dr Jekyll and Mr Hyde) and also had worn mismatching socks to his graduation, and also eats a large amount (although Rosalind describes him as being "too skinny"). He plans on being a pilot when he grows up. His affection for Rosalind becomes apparent at the beginning of The Penderwicks on Gardam Street, but her indifference leads him to date an eighth-grade cheerleader, Trilby Ramirez, for several weeks, during which he and Rosalind have an argument and then ignore each other. However, the two make amends and, Tommy having left Trilby, begin dating after Rosalind's thirteenth birthday in April. He and Rosalind break up when Rosalind goes to college, Rosalind dating Oliver, a classmate of hers whom everyone despises, but Rosalind soon realizes that she still likes Tommy, and they start dating again. In book five Tommy and Rosalind are getting married at Arundel.
- Nick Geiger - Tommy's older brother, with similar looks. He's very sporty and a born leader. That's why he plans to become a coach someday. He likes torturing the Penderwicks with his training programs, but the girls are able to succeed as a result. On Halloween, he rescues Batty after she got afraid of someone in a Mr. Spock costume, who turns out to be the Bug Man. Later he attends with Rosalind's friend Anna to Mr. Penderwick's wedding. He goes to war, and in the beginning of book four is impatiently expected home, especially by Ben Penderwick, whose idol he is. He marries Laura, and they have two children, the youngest of whom is Georgia.
- Pearson - Skye's school buddy. He sits next to her at school and loves racing with her. He plays Coyote in Jane's school play and is so much impressed that he wants to date Skye afterwards, assuming Skye as the author, but Skye turns him down. Jane calls him a good actor and he seems to like the philosophical, romantic thoughts of the play.
- Melissa Patenaude - Skye's archenemy at school. She is the captain of Skye's rival soccer team. She crushes Pearson and is jealous of Skye. But in the end, it seems like that both become friends.
- Mr. Geballe - Skye's sixth grade teacher, he is in charge of the sixth grade play, and so it is he who selected Jane's play (masked as Skye's) to be the play for the year, and casts Skye for the lead part despite her hatred of acting. He is kind and trusting, as demonstrated by his complete lack of suspicion, even though he knows Skye to dislike creative assignments.
- Miss Bunda - Jane's fifth grade teacher, she frequently assigns essays to her students on topics like "Famous Women in Massachusetts History" and "How Science Has Changed Our Lives". Jane, preferring creative writing over essays, receives a "C" on her "Women in Massachusetts" essay because she wrote about Sabrina Starr. Similarly to Mr. Geballe, she is completely deceived by Skye and Jane's homework switch. Miss Bunda is described as boring by Jane.
