= Bible for children =

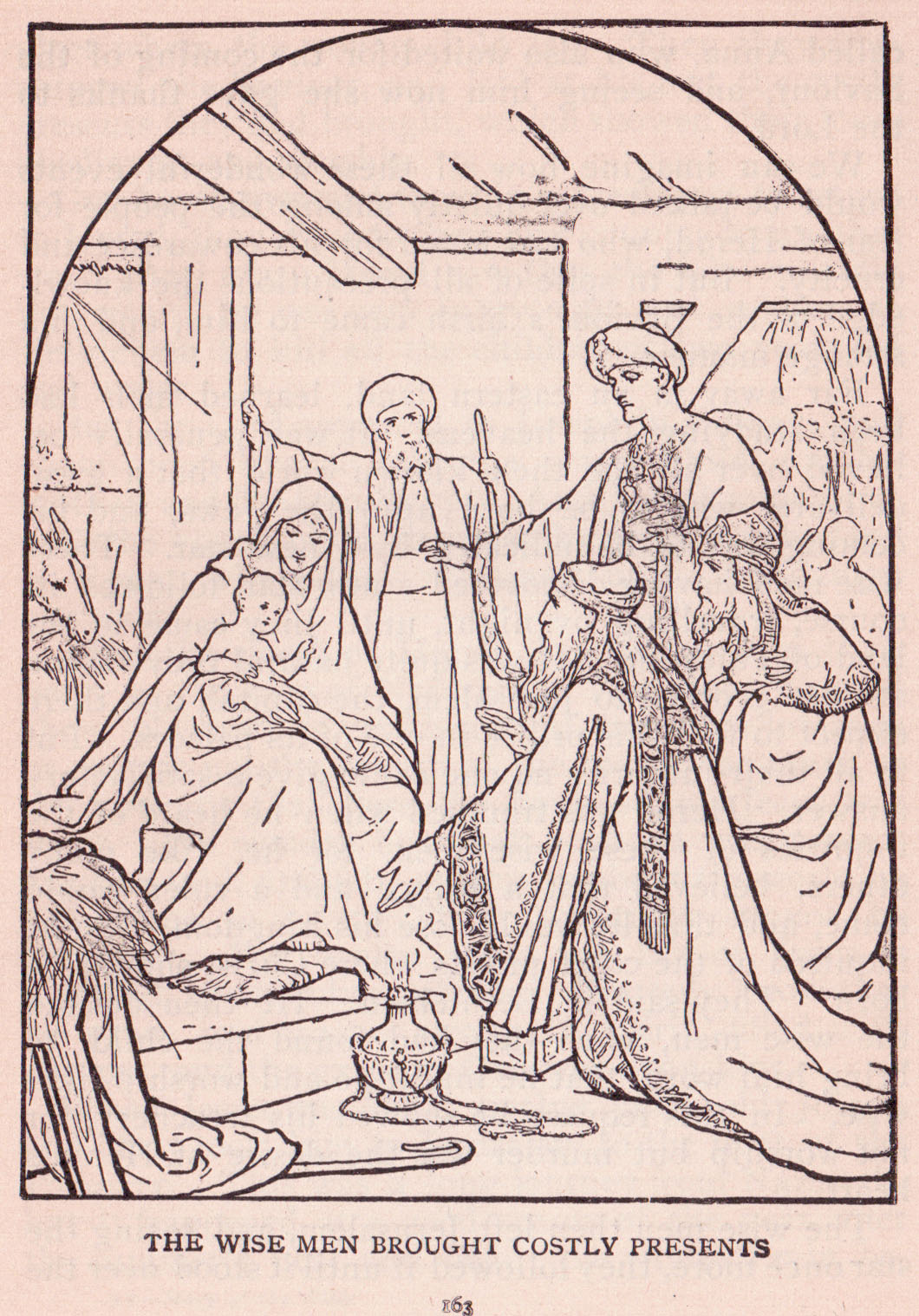
"The Wise Men"; illustration from A Child's Story of the Bible, 1899

Children's Bibles, or Bibles for children, are often collections of Bible stories rather than actual translations of the Bible and are aimed at children. These adaptations of the Bible are written to be more understandable and entertaining for younger audiences.

There is a range of simplicity across various children's Bible publications. More image focused variations, often made for children aged 3-6, rely less on words to convey a message and prominently feature drawings and artistic interpretations of the Bible. While some publications quote directly from the Bible, others paraphrase the text. All of these different publications are created to appeal to audiences of different ages and levels of comprehension.

== History of Christian Children's Bibles ==
As of 2024, the Bible has been translated into 756 languages. Within the English language alone, there are many different translations of the Bible, including the New Living Translation, King James Version, New International Version, and many more. These texts appeal to an older audience, most commonly from the 7-12th grade reading level. Some versions have been written in simpler language, such as the ICB (International Children's Bible) version. Children's Bibles, however, are not direct translations of the Bible, but are rather simplistic and take more of a storytelling approach, often with images.

First printed in London in 1759, The Children's Bible was the earliest Bible for children printed in America. While this may have been the first official text published in the US, the simple, narrative style seen in children's Bibles today dates back to the work of Peter Comestor in the late twelfth century: Historia Scholastica. His work presents the Bible through stories and also includes non-Biblical material.

There have been many other publications of different Bibles for children since The Children's Bible was published in 1759. In 1934 Lenore Cohen's work: Bible Tales for Very Young Children was published by the Union of American Hebrew Congregations. This novel became a staple in the curriculum for different religious institutions internationally at the time.

Another author of early children's Bibles is Sebastian Castellio. When he was the headmaster of the Collége de Rive in Calvinist, Geneva, he wrote Dialogorum Sacrorum Libri Quatuor as a way to introduce the schoolboys at his institution to Biblical texts. This work was published in the 1540s and was widely distributed in Europe.

== Popular Christian Children's Bibles ==
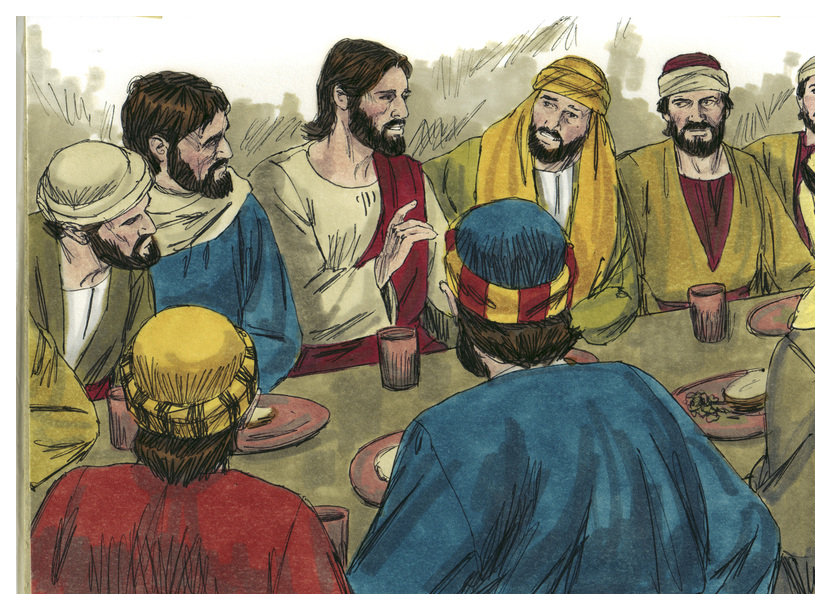
Illustration of Jesus talking with his disciples

In 1991, The Children's Bible Storybook was published, retelling around 300 Bible stories alongside different illustrations. It was written by Anne de Graaf and illustrated by José Pérez Montero. Since its publication it has sold over 6 million copies and has been distributed in 93 languages.

Another recent publication is the Adventure Bible Storybook written by Catherine DeVries and illustrated by Jim Madsen. This work was published by Zonderkidz in 2009 and has sold over 9 million copies.

One of the newer publications of children's Bibles is called The Action Bible and was first published in 2010. This work features a retelling of hundreds of stories from the Bible, but in the form of a comic, with lots of graphics and Scripture retold in the form of thought bubbles for the different characters. The illustrator for this work is Sergio Cariello. This children's Bible has been translated into 83 different languages, and over 3.5 million copies have been sold.

== Zonderkidz ==
Zonderkidz is the children’s section of the publishing company Zondervan. Zondervan was established by two brothers, Pat and Bernard Zondervan, in 1931 in Michigan. Since its establishment, Zondervan has published over 300 books and Bibles a year in over 100 countries and 65 languages. Zondervan was acquired by HarperCollins in 1988. Here is a list of some of the works produced by this publishing company:

- I Wonder: Exploring God’s Grand Story
- God’s Little Lambs, My First Bible
- Once Upon a Time Storybook Bible
- Ready, Set, Find Bible Stories
- Read and Play Baby Bible
- Children of God Storybook Bible
- Baby’s First Bible

== Other Notable Christian Children's Bibles ==
- The Big Picture Story Bible
- The Jesus Storybook Bible

== Jewish Children's Bibles ==
Christian children’s Bibles were published long before Jewish children’s Bibles. One of the first Jewish children’s works was written by Moses Mordecai Budinger in 1823. When introducing the Bible to children, Jewish authors departed from teaching directly from the full Bible text and chose stories that were digestible for children, but authors did not include additional stories. Rather than being retold in Hebrew, these stories were told in the vernacular. In comparison to the Christian children’s texts, these works historically did not have as many illustrations.

The Children’s Illustrated Jewish Bible is written by Laaren Brown and Lenny Hort and illustrated by Eric Thomas. Published in 2020 by DK Children, it details key characters and stories from the Hebrew Bible.

== See also ==
- Bibles for Children, a UK Charity
