= Bibles for Children =

UK charity

Bibles for Children is a charity in the United Kingdom registered with the Charity Commission. It was established in 1997 by Ted Hudson with the aim of advancing the understanding of the Christian religion through the provision of The Children's Bible Story Book (1991) by Anne de Graaf to every primary school child in Great Britain. During its first thirteen years of operation, the charity provided Children's Bibles to 264,000 pupils in over 1100 schools in 102 Local Education Authorities throughout England, Wales and Scotland. Bibles for Children works closely with the headteachers of primary schools.

== See also ==
- Bibles for children, general topic
- Christianity
