= Madgy Figgy's Chair =

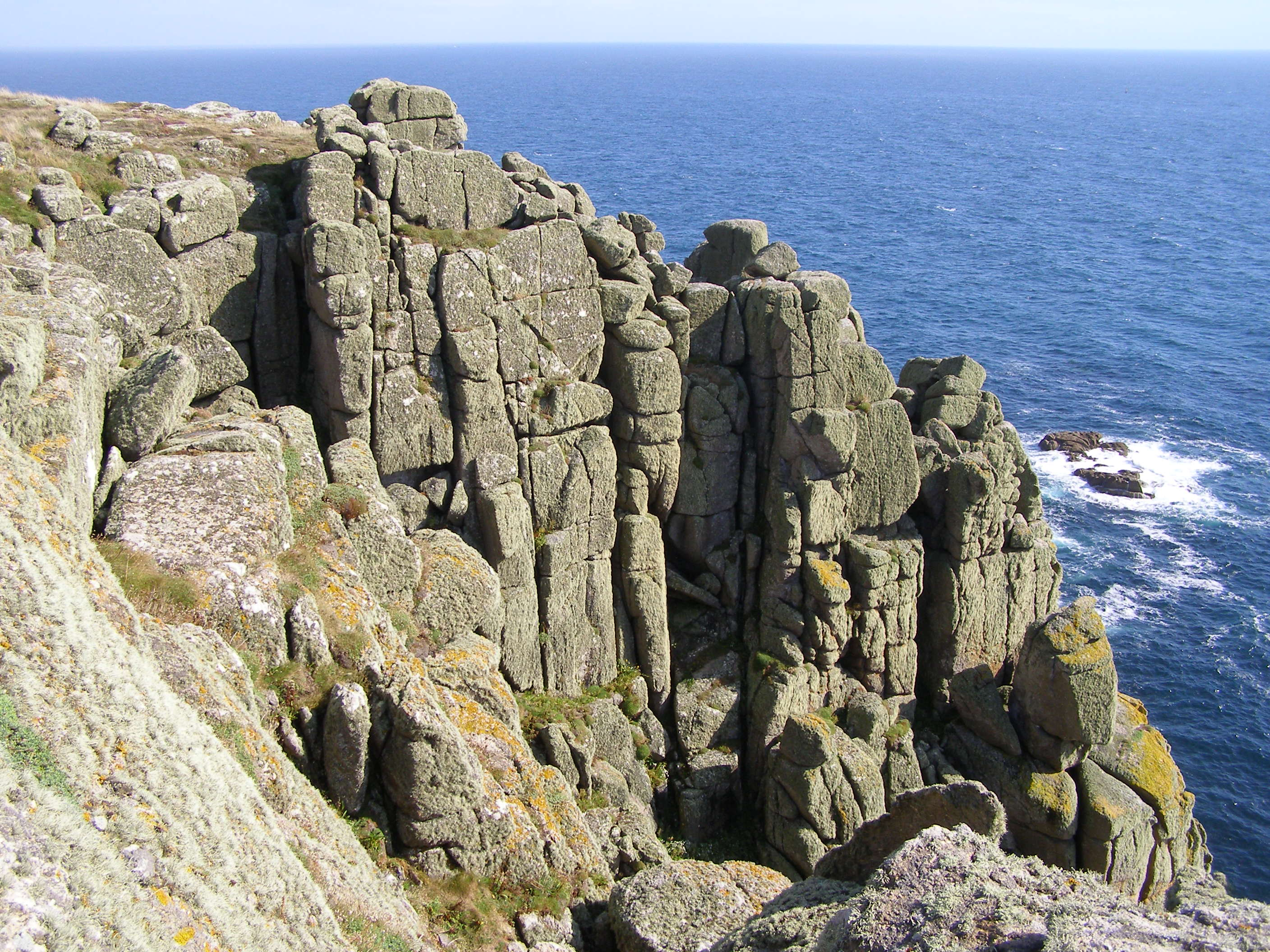
The Chair Ladder, St Levan, with Madgy Figgy's chair at the top

Madgy Figgy's Chair is a granite rock whose shape is reminiscent of a chair. It sits atop a tower of granite blocks, known as the Chair Ladder at Gwennap Head near St Levan in Cornwall.

Madgy Figgy is a character from local mythology. She was a witch who lived in St Levan and led a large group of witches and men who indulged in wrecking. Madgy Figgy was supposed to sit in the chair to conjure up storms to wreck ships so they could be plundered.

Stories about Figgy include the cursed treasure from the body of a Portuguese woman washed ashore from a wreck. A curse mark was found on the body which caused the rest of the gang to refuse to have anything to do with her valuables. Later, a blue light appeared over Madgy Figgy's Chair and travelled from there to where she had stored the treasure in her house. After several days of this, an African man, who spoke no English, followed the light and found the treasure. He retrieved some personal items of the woman but left the valuables. Although he could not speak to Figgy, he made it clear that the woman meant something to him and rewarded Figgy for holding on to her things.

Another story involves a pig belonging to her neighbour Tom Trenoworth. Figgy tried to buy the pig for much less than it was worth but Tom refused. Figgy caused the pig to go out of control while Tom was taking it to market and it got stuck in a small space under Tregenebris bridge. When Figgy turned up, Tom, now hungry, gave her the pig in exchange for a loaf of bread, if she could get it out. This she did by calling "cheat! cheat! cheat!" to it.

== In popular culture ==
Skinner's Brewery named a beer "Figgy's Brew" after Madgy Figgy.

A children's book version of Madgy Figgy's Pig was written by Will Coleman and illustrated by Jago in 2005 (ISBN 0954965701).
