= GURPS Fantasy Bestiary =

1990 supplement for the GURPS role-playing game

Fantastic creatures for fantasy roleplaying
- Cover by Carol Heyer
- Designers: Steffan O'Sullivan
- Publishers: Steve Jackson Games
- Publication: 1990; 36 years ago
- Genres: Fantasy
- Systems: GURPS

GURPS Fantasy Bestiary is a fantasy bestiary sourcebook for the GURPS (Generic Universal Role-Playing System), written by Steffan O'Sullivan, and published by Steve Jackson Games in 1990.

== Contents ==
GURPS Fantasy Bestiary is a supplement for GURPS Magic containing original monsters and creatures found commonly in fantasy settings.

== Publication history ==
GURPS Fantasy Bestiary was written by Steffan O'Sullivan with Steve Jackson and Warren Spector, with a cover by Carol Heyer and illustrations by Tom Baxa, and published as a 128-page book by Steve Jackson Games in 1990.

== Reception ==
Lawrence Schick noted the "Animals with Multiple or Unusual Heads" as his favorite section.

== See also ==
- List of GURPS publications
