= The Book of Belonging =

2024 children's Bible

- Author: Mariko Clark
- Illustrator: Rachel Eleanor
- Language: English
- Genre: Children's Bible
- Publisher: Convergent Books
- Publication date: September 24, 2024
- Publication place: United States
- Pages: 288
- ISBN: 9780593580318
- Website: thebookofbelonging.com

The Book of Belonging: Bible Stories for Kind and Contemplative Kids is a children's story Bible written by Mariko Clark and illustrated by Rachel Eleanor. The book contains 42 Bible stories, and is centered around the themes of belonging, beloved-ness, and delight. It is aimed for children 7-12 years of age.

== Development ==
Clark was inspired to write the book in 2020, after her six-year-old daughter asked whether God liked boys more than girls, a sentiment drawn from her story Bible, which only had two stories featuring women. Upon studying other popular children's Bibles, Clark found that women were underrepresented, with an average of 7% of her sampled books being stories about women, and only 23% of images featuring a woman or girl.

A Kickstarter campaign for the book was started in 2021. Originally requesting $73,000, the campaign met its goal in ten days and ultimately raised more than $95,000. Although much early feedback was positive, Clark reports she also received criticism from people who suggested she was undermining "Christian values". Clark and Eleanor were introduced to Convergent Books by literary agent Jonathan Merritt. As proof of concept, they presented the first chapter, covering the Genesis creation story.

Clark and Eleanor worked with multiple outside experts, including Hebrew-language expert Elle Grover Fricks, and New Testament academic Dr. Jennifer Garcia Bashaw, as well as "scholars [of] womanist theology, disability theology, and queer theology".

== Style and contents ==
The book is broken up into the Old and New Testaments, with 20 stories from the former and 22 from the latter. Stories are flanked by "mindful moments" and "wonder moments", which encourage readers to ask questions and reflect on the story.

Clark chose to use the original Hebrew and Greek names of Biblical figures.

Illustrator Rachel Eleanor aimed to depict figures in historically and culturally accurate ways. Eleanor also aimed for her illustrations to include more women, people of all ages and body types, and disabled people. God is often portrayed in the book as wind. Her illustrations include details not expanded upon in the text, such as a border referencing the stations of the cross, or scenes from Sarah and Hagar's story, included to allow parents to expand on the story with their children as they saw fit. One of Eleanor's favorite illustrations in the book is the story of Esther, which is presented in a graphic novel format, distinct from the rest of the book.

Some stories in the book include the Crucifixion, the Garden of Eden, King David, Esther, Jael, the Last Supper, Moses and the burning bush, the Prodigal Son, Sarah and Hagar, and Zelophelad's daughters.

== Reception ==
The Book of Belonging was positively received by Kirkus Reviews and by various religious publications, including Englewood Review, The Presbyterian Outlook, and Sojourners. Reviewers praised both Clark's writing and Eleanor's illustrations.
