= Monarch Award =

Literary award

- Awarded for: Reader's choice award for K-3rd Illinois students
- Country: United States
- Presented by: Illinois school library media association
- First award: 2003
- Website: ISLMA website

The Monarch Award: Illinois' K-3 Readers' Choice Award was established in 2003 by the Illinois School Library Media Association (ISLMA) to help Kindergarten through 3rd grade readers become familiar with books, illustrators and authors; encourage children to read critically; and to develop a statewide awareness of outstanding literature for children.

The award name and image was chosen as a symbol of growth, change and freedom and to help familiarize students with the state's insect.

== Award Process ==
The award is given annually (beginning in 2005) to a single author and/or illustrator by a collective vote of Kindergarten through 3rd grade students in Illinois. The award is administered by a steering committee that seeks nominations from public librarians, school library media specialist, teachers, and students. A volunteer reading committee then forms a master list of 20 of the nominated titles which include a range of interests and reading levels as well as 3 of each of the following types of children's books:

- Picture books
- Easy readers
- Chapter books

Students vote in February of each year for their favorite from the master list and the results are announced the following month.

== Criteria for nomination ==
- Nominator must have read the book
- Book copyrighted within the past 5 years
- Be in print at the time of selection
- Author and/or illustrator must be living at the time of selection of mater list
- Book must be of interest and appeal to children in grades kindergarten through 3rd grade
- Must have literary merit
- May be fiction or nonfiction
- No title or series may be on two consecutive master lists
- If a title in a series has been awarded, other books in that series are ineligible for 5 years
- Book must not be a textbook, anthology, translation, toy, puzzle, pop-up or formula fiction

== Recipients ==
Yellow background distinguishes winners from those runners-up that are listed.

Year	Writer	Illustrator	Title	Citation
2005	David Shannon	Shannon	David Gets in Trouble	Winner
2005	Helen Lester	Lynn Munsinger	Hooway for Wodney Wat	2nd Place
2005	Lauren Child	Child	I Will Never Not Eat a Tomato	3rd Place
2006	Keiko Kasza	Kasza	My Lucky Day	Winner
2007	Caralyn Buehner	Mark Buehner	Superdog: The Heart of a Hero	Winner
2008	Chris Van Dusen	Van Dusen	If I Built a Car	Winner
2009	Kevin O'Malley	O'Malley, Carol Heyer and Scott Goto	Once Upon a Cool Motorcycle Dude	Winner
2010	Mélanie Watt	Watt	Scaredy Squirrel	Winner
2011	Jan Thomas	Thomas	Rhyming Dust Bunnies	Winner
2012	Chris Barton	Tom Lichtenheld	Shark vs. Train	Winner
2012	Amy Krause Rosenthal	Tom Lichtenheld	Duck! Rabbit!	2nd Place
2012	David Ezra Stein	Stein	Interrupting Chicken	3rd Place
