= Jane Dyer =

American author and illustrator

- Born: March 7, 1949 (age 77)
- Known for: illustrating Lucky and Squash
- Website: www.rmichelson.com/illustration/jane-dyer/

Jane Dyer (born 1949) is an American author and illustrator of more than fifty books, including Amy Krouse Rosenthal's Cookies series and Jeanne Birdsall's Lucky and Squash.

== Background ==
Dyer grew up in New Jersey and Pennsylvania. She used to teach, write, and illustrate textbooks before she began illustrating children's books full-time. She was encouraged to begin illustrating by her students and their parents. She says she draws inspiration from the books of her childhood and the clothes her mother preserved from her own childhood, which Dyer liked to dress up in as a young girl.

Most of Dyer's work in children books illustrates family or home scenes. Dyer is a twin and often illustrates books with her daughter, Brooke Dyer. Dyer has a Tibetan Terrier named Scuppers.

In 2015, Dyer spoke at the Eric Carle Museum of Picture Book Art in Amherst, Massachusetts and read Lucky and Squash aloud as part of her talk on the art-making process for picture books.

== Works ==
- Time for Bed (Mem Fox, 1997), illustrator
- All We Know (Linda Ashman, 2016), illustrator
- The House That's Your Home (Sally Lloyd-Jones, 2015), illustrator
- There's A Train Out for Dreamland (Frederich H. Heider, 2010), co-illustrator (with Brooke Dyer)
- Every Year on Your Birthday (Rose A. Lewis, 2007), illustrator
- Hurry! Hurry! Have You Heard? ( Laura Krauss Melmed, 2008), illustrator
- Wee Rhymes (Jane Yolen, 2013), illustrator
- Lucky and Squash (Jeanne Birdsall, 2012), illustrator
- Santa Claus and the Three Bears (Maria Modungo, 2013), co-illustrated with Brooke Dyer
- Cookies: Bite-Size Lessons (Amy Krouse Rosenthal, 2006), illustrator
- Christmas Cookies: Bite-Size Holiday Lessons (Amy Krouse Rosenthal, 2008), illustrator
- One Smart Cookie: Bite-Size Lessons for the School Years and Beyond (Amy Krouse Rosenthal, 2010), co-illustrated with Brooke Dyer
- Move Over, Rover! (Karen Beaumont, 2006)
- Goodnight Goodnight Sleepyhead (Ruth Krauss, 2007), illustrator
- Whose Garden Is It? (Mary Ann Hoberman, 2014), illustrator
- I Love You Like Crazy Cakes (Rose A. Lewis, 2000), illustrator
- A Woman For President: The Story of Victoria Woodhull (Kathleen Krull, 2006), illustrator
- Oh My Baby, Little One (Kathi Appelt, 2006), illustrator
- Cinderella's Dress (Nancy Willard, 2003), illustrator
- Babies on the Go (Linda Ashman, 2003), illustrator
- Good Morning, Sweeite Pie, and other Poems for Little Children (Cynthia Rylant, 2001), author and illustrator
- Little Brown Bear Won't Take a Nap! (2002), author and illustrator
- Little Brown Bear Won't Go to School! (2003), author and illustrator
- Little Brown Bear and the Bundle of Joy (2005), author and illustrator
- Sophie's Masterpiece: A Spider's Tale (Eileen Spinelli, 2004), illustrator
- Blue Moon Soup: A Family Cookbook (Gary Goss, 2013), illustrator
- When Mama Comes Home Tonight (Eileen Spinelli, 1998), illustrator
- Child of Faerie, Child of Earth (Jane Yolen, 1997), illustrator
- Animal Crackers: A Delectable Collection of Pictures, Poems, and Lullabies for the Very Young (1996), author
- Cracked Corn and Snow Ice Cream: A Family Almanac (Nancy Willard, 1997), illustrator
- The Snow Speaks (Nancy White Carlstrom, 1992), illustrator
- If Anything Ever Goes Wrong at the Zoo (Mary Jean Hendrick, 1996), illustrator
- The Random House Book of Bedtime Stories (2007), illustrator
- Talking Like the Rain: A Read-To-Me Book of Poems (X.J. and Dorothy Kennedy, 2002), illustrator
- The Girl in the Golden Bower (Jane Yolen, 1994), illustrator
- Piggins (Jane Yolen, 1992), illustrator
- Picnic With Piggins (Jane Yolen, 1993), illustrator
- Piggins and the Royal Wedding (Jane Yolen, 1989), illustrator

== Reception of works ==
Dyer has received multiple awards throughout her career, including two Parent's Choice Honor Books for Illustration awards. In a School Library Journal review of Lucky and Squash, Anne Beier of the Hendrick Hudson Free Library in Montrose, New York, praises Dyer's illustrations and states that Dyer's paintings of the titular dogs' faces are priceless, particularly in the scenes where they are looking at each other through the fence and those where they are in their owners' arms. Similarly, a Kirkus Reviews article calls the illustrations in this book charming and writes that they "have all the clever details that are Dyer's signature touch". Connie Fletcher of Booklist suggests that, apart from the "ominous grays and greens" in the illustrations of one scene, the pastel-colored illustrations in the book are evocative of 1940s picture postcards, which she considers "just right for such jolly capers".
