= Once Upon a Cool Motorcycle Dude =

2005 children's picture book

Once Upon a Cool Motorcycle Dude is a 2005 picture book written by Kevin O'Malley and illustrated by O'Malley, Carol Heyer, and Scott Goto. The book is told in dialogue between a boy and girl who are assigned to write a story together. After interrupting each other and having trouble at first, the two are able to complete the story together. The Washington Post called "the illustrations, by O'Malley, Carol Heyer and Scott Goto... a gleeful clash of styles and stereotypes". Kirkus Reviews said the "disarming, funny and not agenda-driven dig at the hot-button issue of gender differences is likely to excite plenty of giggles—and perhaps some discussion, too." Publishers Weekly said, "Three artists with distinct styles combine efforts for this rollicking story, which takes on the topic of gender differences with humor and insight." The book had a sequel, Once Upon a Royal Superbaby.

== Film adaptation ==
On June 10, 2024, Paramount Animation and Karen Rosenfelt will produce an animated movie adaptation is being developed under the title Once Upon a Motorcycle Dude.
