= The Penderwicks =

2005 children's novel by Jeanne Birdsall

- Language: English
- Genre: Fiction
- Publisher: Alfred A. Knopf
- Publication date: June 2005
- Publication place: United States
- Media type: Print (paperback)
- Pages: 272 pp
- ISBN: 0-375-83143-6
- OCLC: 56631524
- LC Class: PZ7.B51197 Pe 2005
- Followed by: The Penderwicks on Gardam Street

The Penderwicks: A Summer Tale of Four Sisters, Two Rabbits, and a Very Interesting Boy is a children's novel by Jeanne Birdsall and the first book in the Penderwicks series. Published by Knopf in 2005, The Penderwicks was inspired by stories Birdsall read growing up. The book is about the Penderwicks, a family of four sisters, and their adventures during a summer vacation in Massachusetts.

The Penderwicks won a National Book Award in 2005. Both The Penderwicks and its sequel, The Penderwicks on Gardam Street, were New York Times Best Sellers. The remaining books in the series are The Penderwicks at Point Mouette, The Penderwicks in Spring, and The Penderwicks at Last.

== Plot ==
The Penderwicks are a family of four sisters: Rosalind, Skye, Jane, and Batty. The sisters, their father, and Hound, the Penderwicks' dog, travel to Arundel Cottage in Massachusetts for a summer vacation. After the Penderwicks arrive at the cottage, Skye explores Arundel Estate and meets Cagney, the gardener, in the garden. Mrs. Tifton, the owner of Arundel, comes looking for Cagney, so he hides Skye in an urn. Mrs. Tifton tells Cagney to remove the Fimbriata rosebush that his uncle had planted. Once she leaves, Skye and Cagney decide to move the bush near the cottage. On her way back to the cottage, Skye runs into Mrs. Tifton's son, Jeffrey. Not knowing who he is, she insults Mrs. Tifton and warns Jeffrey to stay out of the garden.

Skye tells Rosalind about Jeffrey and the garden incident, and they send Jane to apologize to Jeffrey on Skye's behalf. Jeffrey accepts Jane's apology, and they walk to the cottage together. Meanwhile, Skye and Rosalind bake cookies for Jeffrey, but when Cagney arrives with the Fimbriata, Rosalind goes to help him. Left alone, Skye forgets about the cookies and burns them. When Rosalind returns, Skye yells at her and calls Jeffrey a snob, just as Jeffrey and Jane arrive. Mr. Penderwick sends Skye, Jane, Batty, and Jeffrey on a walk. Jeffrey takes them to see a neighboring farmer's bull, and Batty unknowingly wanders into its pen. Skye, Jane, and Jeffrey save Batty from the bull, and swear not to tell Mr. Penderwick or Rosalind about the incident.

Jeffrey invites the sisters to his birthday party at Arundel, and Mrs. Tifton and her boyfriend, Dexter Dupree, are rude to the sisters. Later, the sisters and Jeffrey discover that Mrs. Tifton and Dexter plan to get married and send Jeffrey to Pencey, a military academy. After the party, Skye, Jane, and Jeffrey spend their days playing soccer and practicing archery, while Rosalind and Batty visit Cagney's apartment to feed his pet rabbits, Yaz and Carla. One day, Rosalind is too busy to take Batty to see the rabbits, so Batty visits them herself. After meeting Mrs. Tifton, Batty accidentally lets Yaz escape and decides to search for it. Hound senses that Batty is missing and runs away, leading the other Penderwick sisters and Jeffrey to Batty and the lost rabbit. Batty walks into the street in the path of a car and Jeffrey pulls her out of the way.

A few days later, Skye, Jane, and Jeffrey run into the Arundel gardens, forgetting about the Garden Club Contest and Mrs. Tifton's warning to stay out of the garden. Mrs. Tifton forbids Jeffrey from seeing the Penderwicks again, but when Mrs. Tifton and Dexter leave Arundel, Skye and Batty visit Jeffrey. Dexter and Mrs. Tifton come home early and kick the sisters out, but they return and eavesdrop. Skye hears Mrs. Tifton criticize the Penderwick family and confronts her before returning to the cottage. Skye tells Rosalind everything Mrs. Tifton said about the Penderwicks, including Rosalind. Upset, Rosalind goes for a walk in the middle of the night and accidentally falls into a pond. She injures her head and Cagney brings her home.

Skye receives a message from Jeffrey through Churchie, telling her that Mrs. Tifton and Dexter took him for an interview at the military school, but that it was not Skye's fault. After visiting Pencey, Jeffrey visits the cottage and tells the sisters that he is running away to Boston. Rosalind invites Jeffrey to stay with them for the night, and he accepts. The next morning, Mrs. Tifton and Dexter arrive at the cottage, searching for Jeffrey. Jeffrey explains to Mrs. Tifton that he does not want to go to Pencey. Mrs. Tifton listens to Jeffrey and agrees to let him take piano lessons at the Boston Music Conservatory instead. A few days later, after saying goodbye to Jeffrey, Churchie, Cagney, and Yaz and Carla, the Penderwicks return home.

== Characters ==
The four Penderwick sisters share some similarities with the four March sisters from Little Women. Like Meg, Rosalind is the oldest and takes her responsibility for her younger sisters seriously. She is usually the voice of reason when decisions need to be made. Skye is a tomboy with a quick temper like Jo, and is considered the most intelligent sister because she excels at math. Jane is a writer and enjoys writing fictional stories for her family to read, which is also similar to Jo. She is imaginative and describes the world around her as if she is the main character from her books, Sabrina Starr, which is something that her sisters do not always understand. Batty, the youngest Penderwick sister, is very shy around other people, but loves animals. She shares a special bond with Hound, the Penderwick's dog, who often sleeps in Batty's room and plays with her.

== Reception ==
The Penderwicks won the annual National Book Foundation's National Book Award for Young People's Literature in 2005. The judges compared the Penderwicks to the March sisters from Louisa May Alcott's Little Women and the Bastables from E. Nesbit's The Story of the Treasure Seekers.

In 2012, it was ranked number 29 on a list of the top 100 children's novels published by School Library Journal. The Penderwicks is recommended for readers ages 9 and up by Common Sense Media.
