= The Penderwicks on Gardam Street =

2008 children's novel by Jeanne Birdsall

- Author: Jeanne Birdsall
- Language: English
- Series: The Penderwicks
- Genre: Fiction
- Publisher: Random House Children's Books
- Publication date: April 8, 2008
- Publication place: United States
- Pages: 308
- ISBN: 9-780-37584-0906
- OCLC: 1050085448
- Preceded by: The Penderwicks: A Summer Tale of Four Sisters, Two Rabbits, and a Very Interesting Boy
- Followed by: The Penderwicks at Point Mouette

The Penderwicks on Gardam Street is a children's novel by Jeanne Birdsall, published by Random House Children's Books in 2008. It is the second book in the Penderwicks series, and is preceded by The Penderwicks. Both The Penderwicks on Gardam Street and The Penderwicks were New York Times Best Sellers. The books in the series also include The Penderwicks at Point Mouette, The Penderwicks in Spring, and The Penderwicks at Last, the last of them being published in 2018.

== Plot ==
Rosalind, Skye, Jane, and Batty live with their father in the fictional town of Cameron in Western Massachusetts. When their Aunt Claire arrives with a letter from their late mother urging their father to start dating again, the sisters are immediately afraid of the possibility of a wicked stepmother. They decide to secretly set their father up on bad dates so that he won't fall in love again.

Another new development on Gardam Street is the arrival of Iantha, a widow with a toddler son named Ben who becomes fast friends with Batty. Iantha is an astrophysicist and a colleague of Mr. Penderwick’s at Cameron University. Meanwhile, the across-the-street neighbor and schoolmate of the Penderwicks, Tommy Geiger, has developed a crush on Rosalind, to which she is oblivious. Skye and Jane’s primary concern is their soccer team, of which Skye is captain, and their schoolwork.

When Skye and Jane decide to swap homework assignments, chaos ensues. While Skye’s science essay for Jane merely gets her an A, Jane’s original play about the Aztecs for Skye is selected to be performed in front of the entire school, with an unwilling Skye cast in the starring role. On top of this, after two bad dates set up by the sisters, Mr. Penderwick has begun seeing a mysterious woman named Marianne, and Tommy has stopped talking to Rosalind entirely. Additionally, Batty and Ben won’t stop worrying about Bug Man, a mysterious figure who Batty claims has been roaming their neighborhood.

On the night Jane’s play is to be performed, Skye passes out from nerves and a delighted Jane goes on in her stead. Afterward, they reveal their deception to their father, who is understanding and reveals one of his own: Marianne, his girlfriend, is actually Marianne Dashwood of Jane Austen’s Sense and Sensibility, which he has been reading rather than going on the dates he promised to Aunt Claire. The next day, Skye and Jane win their soccer league, and Rosalind realizes that the person their father actually has feelings for is Iantha, now a family friend.

The sisters conspire successfully to get their father and Iantha to go together to a university gala. That night, a break-in attempt by a disturbed colleague of Ianthe’s who was convinced she had stolen his research (the real “Bug Man”) is foiled by Rosalind and Tommy, who admit their feelings for each other and decide to start dating when they are older. The sisters give Mr. Penderwick their blessing to begin dating Iantha, and the book closes with their wedding seven months later.

== Reception ==
The Penderwicks on Gardam Street was received positively and seen as a worthy follow-up to the series' critically-acclaimed first book. Kirkus Reviews called the story "a pleasant ramble of a read, replete with well-intentioned scheming, adolescent crushes, horrible homework disasters, soccer, secrets, school dances and lots and lots of literary allusion."
