= The Jesus Storybook Bible =

2007 children's Bible

- Author: Sally Lloyd-Jones
- Illustrator: Jago
- Language: English
- Genre: Children's Book
- Publisher: Zonderkidz
- Publication date: March 2007
- Publication place: United States
- ISBN: 978-0-310-70825-4

The Jesus Storybook Bible is a children's Bible written by New York Times bestselling author Sally Lloyd-Jones and illustrated by Jago from Cornwall. The first edition was published in 2007 by Zonderkidz, the children's arm of American Christian media and publishing company Zondervan.

It has sold two million copies in 19 languages. In 2015 it was included in the Evangelical Christian Publishers Association (ECPA) Top 100 Best-sellers list.

The book is written for children of age four and upwards and includes 44 Bible stories.

Zondervan commissioned the chapter ‘The Servant King’ as an animation which was produced by Quirky Motion and directed by John Lumgair.

== Awards ==
- Gold Moonbeam Children's Book Award 2007

== See also ==
- The Big Picture Story Bible
