= Family Switch =

2023 film by McG

- Release poster
- Directed by: McG
- Screenplay by: Victoria Strouse; Adam Sztykiel
- Story by: Victoria Strouse
- Based on: Bedtime for Mommy by Amy Krouse Rosenthal
- Produced by: Lawrence Grey; Ben Everard; Nicole King Solaka; Jennifer Garner; McG; Mary Viola
- Starring: Jennifer Garner; Ed Helms; Emma Myers; Brady Noon; Rita Moreno
- Cinematography: Marc Spicer
- Edited by: Brian Olds
- Music by: Pinar Toprak
- Production companies: Grey Matter Productions; Linden Productions; Wonderland Sound and Vision
- Distributed by: Netflix
- Release date: November 30, 2023
- Running time: 105 minutes
- Country: United States
- Language: English

Family Switch is a 2023 American fantasy comedy film directed by McG, written by Adam Sztykiel and Victoria Strouse, and starring Jennifer Garner and Ed Helms. The film is based on the children's book Bedtime for Mommy by Amy Krouse Rosenthal. It was released by Netflix on November 30, 2023, and received mixed reviews from critics.

== Plot ==
In Los Angeles, the Walker family - the working couple Jess and Bill, along with their three kids CC, Wyatt and Miles - are a divided family: the parents and the children routinely find themselves at odds, primarily due to their outlooks towards life. With Christmas approaching, the convivial parents vainly attempt to draw the emotionally distant children to spend more time together than individually.

During an excursion to the Griffith Observatory to witness a rare planetary alignment, the fissures between the family erupt - with Jess and CC, Bill and Wyatt simultaneously wishing each other to try being them for a more intimate understanding. While asking an astrologer, Angelica, to take a family picture, a blinding flash rocks the observatory; in the melee, the family damages the telescope.

The next morning, the family wakes up to find themselves accidentally switched bodies from each other: Jess and CC find themselves in each other's bodies, as do Bill and Wyatt, much to their collective horror. Moving to resolve the quagmire, the family employ their unknowing neighbor Rolf to babysit toddler Miles and family dog Pickles, who were also switched. At the observatory, the family manage to bribe the staff to accelerate the telescope's repairs with the aim of switching into their original bodies by the end of the planetary alignment.

Attempts by the family to pursue their regular lives in each other's bodies culminates in disaster: "Jess" (CC) attempts to deliver a presentation to an important client on her mother's behalf, which is ruined when she hastily devours ice cream, kicking in her mother's lactose intolerance, causing her to fart profusely during the meeting, while "CC" (Jess) intentionally compromises her daughter's crucial soccer match to help an injured opponent, which is witnessed by a national recruiter in attendance; "Wyatt" (Bill) bungles his son's interview for a Yale scholarship with his nonchalant attitude, and "Bill" (Wyatt), despite his strange demeanor that day, is invited to a party hosted by his son's crush, Ariana.

Exasperated, the family proceed to discover that the telescope is missing a specially made lens that is crucial to its functioning. Realizing that next alignment would not be until 2162, "Bill" calls in a favor to procure the lens early. Privately, "Bill" divulges the party invitation to "Wyatt", who reluctantly attends with "CC"; he ends up fumbling a would-be intimate moment with Ariana, but he also stands up to his son's bully. Meanwhile, "Jess" and "Bill", who are pressured into kissing by their unknowing neighbors, sneak into the party, where the four manage to enjoy a moment of togetherness, which is sunk when "Bill" learns of "Wyatt"'s rejection of Ariana.

The next day, however, the family learn the hardships each other has to face; "Jess" discovers her mother's sacrifices at work for her daughter's soccer talent, while "CC" discovers her daughter's academic sincerity outside of soccer; "Bill" discovers that his father had sacrificed a potential music career to be a parent.

Accepting that their individual life pursuits may have been lost owing to the switching, the family resolve to stay together irrespectively. They team up to sing at Bill's music concert, which is attended by Jess's clients. The show is a success, and "Jess" is awarded a promotion.

"Bill" finally receives the crucial telescopic lens, and the family race to the observatory with assistance from Angelica. They make it in time, but "Bill" accidentally slips over, destroying the lens in the process. However, they discover "Miles" had pocketed the original lens before the switch; they use it, but nothing occurs.

The next morning, the family discovers they have switched back to their original bodies again. Wyatt doesn't get into Yale, but he decides to pursue a relationship with Ariana and shares his first kiss with her, and CC is given a second chance for national soccer tryouts by the recruiter, who admired her sportsmanship at the game. Angelica watches the reunited family, wishing them a Merry Christmas before driving away.

== Cast ==
- Jennifer Garner as Jess Walker
- Ed Helms as Bill Walker
- Emma Myers as CC Walker
- Brady Noon as Wyatt Walker
- Rita Moreno as Angelica
- Matthias Schweighöfer as Rolf
- Vanessa Carrasco as Ariana
- Cyrus Arnold as Hunter Drew
- Ilia Isorelýs Paulino as Kara
- Jordan Leftwich as Ava
- Xosha Roquemore as Carrie
- Bashir Salahuddin as Molson
- Paul Scheer as Steven
- Helen Hong as Simone
- Fortune Feimster as Coach Kim
- Ned Bellamy as Hanes
- Andrew Bachelor as Glen
- Dan Finnerty as Gus
- Howie Mandel as Barry
- Rivers Cuomo as Lake
- Brian Bell as Dave
- Scott Shriner as Scott
- Patrick Wilson as Patrick
- Pete Holmes as Peter
- Naomi Ekperigin as Naomi
- Adam Lustick as Spock
- Ravi Kapoor as Mr. Hollis
- Anwar Jibawi as Thunder
- Hannah Stocking as Lighting
- Mark McGrath as DJ Yukon Cornelius
- Bob Stephenson as mild-mannered dad
- Benjamin Flores Jr. as Boss
- Lauren Ash as Barb

== Production ==
In February 2021, it was reported that Jennifer Garner would star in the film, then titled Family Leave. By November 2022, Ed Helms was reported to star in the film, with McG serving as director. In December 2022, Emma Myers and Brady Noon were cast as the children of Garner and Helms' characters.

Principal photography took place in Los Angeles in February 2023, with Marc Spicer serving as the cinematographer.

The film features a number of songs, including multiple renditions of "Santa Claus Is Comin' to Town", in one of which Weezer joined the lead cast. Other songs include "Seven Nation Army" and "Bust a Move".

== Release ==
Family Switch was released on Netflix on November 30, 2023.

== Reception ==
On the review aggregator website Rotten Tomatoes, 47% of 30 critics' reviews are positive, with an average rating of 4.5/10. The website's consensus reads: "A great cast and some moderately heartwarming moments aren't enough to make up for Family Switch's unimaginative take on the overused body-swap gimmick." Metacritic, which uses a weighted average, assigned the film a score of 37 out of 100, based on eight critics, indicating "generally unfavorable" reviews.

Owen Gleiberman of Variety wrote, "Family Switch has bits and pieces of amusement, but mostly you want to swap it for a better movie". Angie Han of The Hollywood Reporter said: "The body-swap comedy isn't good so much as it is completely and totally innocuous. Its characters are drawn in the broadest of strokes and the plot points unfold along creakily predictable beats, but it's too blandly sweet to be irritating or offensive. If you're just looking to fill a movie-shaped hole in your holiday plans, that might make it passable enough."
