= Betty Stogs =

Bad mother and beer

Betty Stogs was a Cornishwoman in a folktale. She lived on moorland near Towednack, Cornwall. She had a six-month-old baby but was lazy and dissipated. The whole town went looking for her child all through the night, but they came up with nothing. Betty was distraught and cried the whole night as she searched for her child. The neglected baby was cared for by the fairies, who returned it clean and laid upon a bed of moss. The tale is a traditional one of the area; a warning to mothers to look after their children properly, lest the pixies take them.

A beer is now named Betty Stogs after this character. With an ABV of 4.0% it is brewed by Skinner's Brewery in Truro and won the CAMRA prize for Champion Best Bitter in 2008. "The link with the brewery and the cleansing of the infant probably being the purity of the water used by the brewery which could be favourably compared with the water used to wash the infant." The beer is the subject of songs:

"Farewell to your wines and whiskies
Your brandies and your grogs
I’d sail the world and back again
For a pint of Betty Stogs"
