= Lucky and Squash =

2012 children's book by Jeanne Birdsall

- Cover
- Author: Jeanne Birdsall
- Illustrator: Jane Dyer
- Cover artist: Jane Dyer
- Language: English
- Subject: Dogs; Friendship; Matchmaking
- Genre: Picture book
- Set in: New York City, United States
- Published: 2012 (Harper)
- Publication place: United States
- Pages: 32
- ISBN: 0060831502
- OCLC: 651153674
- Dewey Decimal: E BIR
- LC Class: PZ7.B51197Luc 2012

Lucky and Squash is a 2012 American children's book written by Jeanne Birdsall and illustrated with watercolor paintings by Jane Dyer published by Harper, an imprint of HarperCollins Publishers. The two eponymous characters are dogs based on Birdsall's and Dyer's actual dogs, Cagney and Scuppers, a Boston Terrier and a Tibetan Terrier respectively.

Lucky and Squash received generally positive reviews. A School Library Journal article praises Birdsall's writing, describing the story as funny, sweet, heartwarming, and suspenseful. A review in Publishers Weekly refers to Lucky and Squash as almost being "Emma meets Ferris Bueller's Day Off with wagging tails" and states that Birdsall's "genial, intimate storytelling instantly establishes a bond with readers". A Booklist reviewer compares the story's dog characters to Pyramus and Thisbe, lovers in Ovid's Metamorphoses who, frustrated by being separated by a wall, conspire to run away together. An article in Kirkus Reviews calls the illustrations charming and says that they "have all the clever details that are Dyer's signature touch".

== Background ==
Lucky and Squash is a children's book by Jeanne Birdsall, author of Flora's Very Windy Day. It is illustrated with watercolor paintings by Jane Dyer, illustrator of more than fifty books. Lucky and Squash was published in 2012 by Harper. The book is appropriate for children between the ages of 3 and 7. The eponymous characters are dogs, Lucky being a brave Lhasa Apso and Squash being a smart Boston Terrier. They are based on two real dogs who had known each other since they were puppies and had often played together: Cagney, Birdsall's Boston Terrier; and Scuppers, Dyer's Tibetan Terrier.

== Plot ==
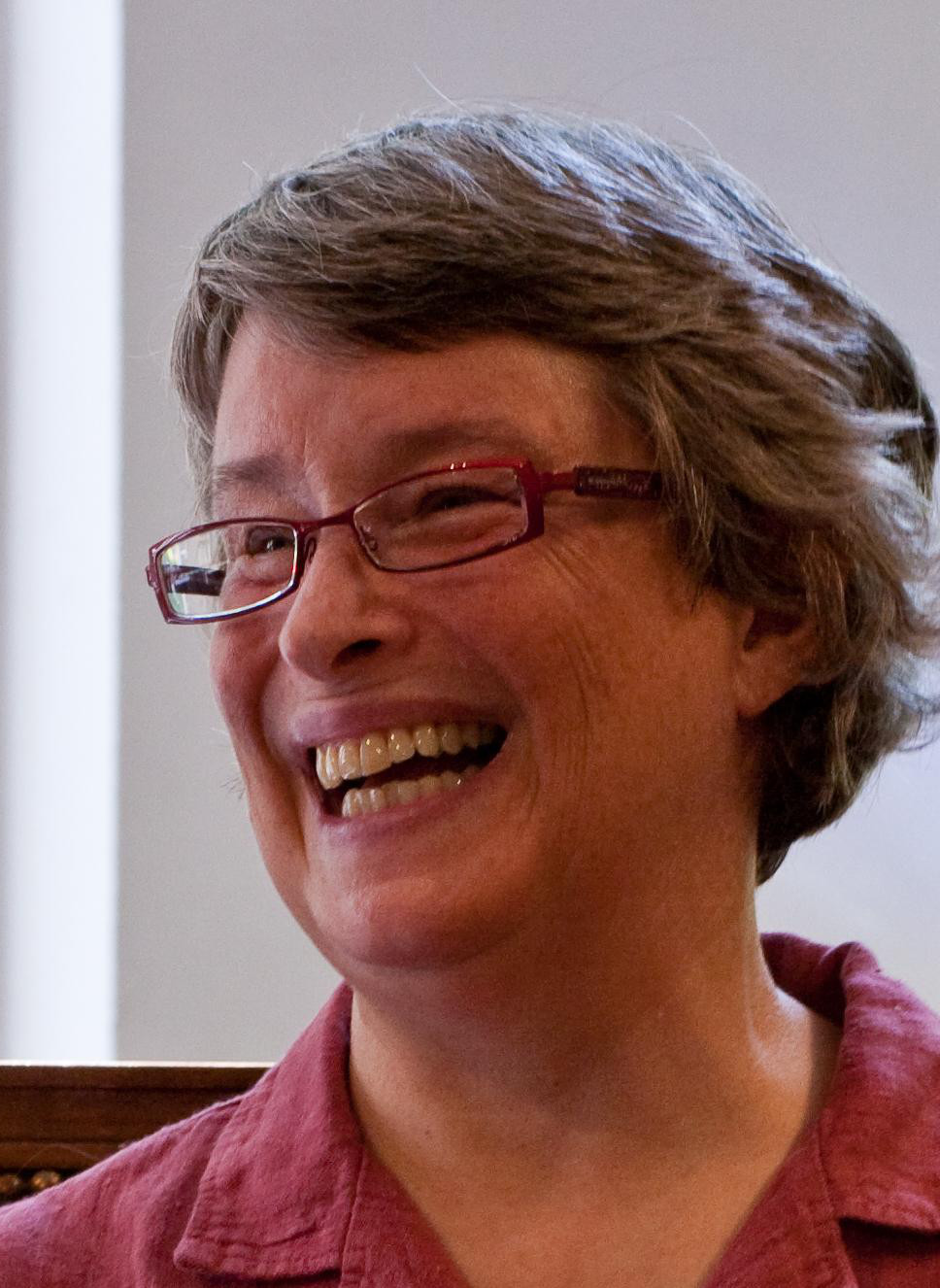
Author Jeanne Birdsall (pictured) modeled the characters of Lucky and Squash after her dog Cagney and illustrator Jane Dyer's dog Scuppers.

Lucky and Squash are neighbors separated by a fence that prevents them from playing together. Lucky's owner, Mr. Bernard, and Squash's owner, Miss Violet, are both single and have never spoken to each other because they are so shy. Lucky and Squash decide to run away hoping that, when their owners come rescue them, the two owners will meet, fall in love, and get married, thereby making the dogs "brothers" and allowing them to play together whenever they wish. Lucky and Squash escape from their respective yards three days in a row and go on adventures. The owners do meet and fall in love.

== Reception ==
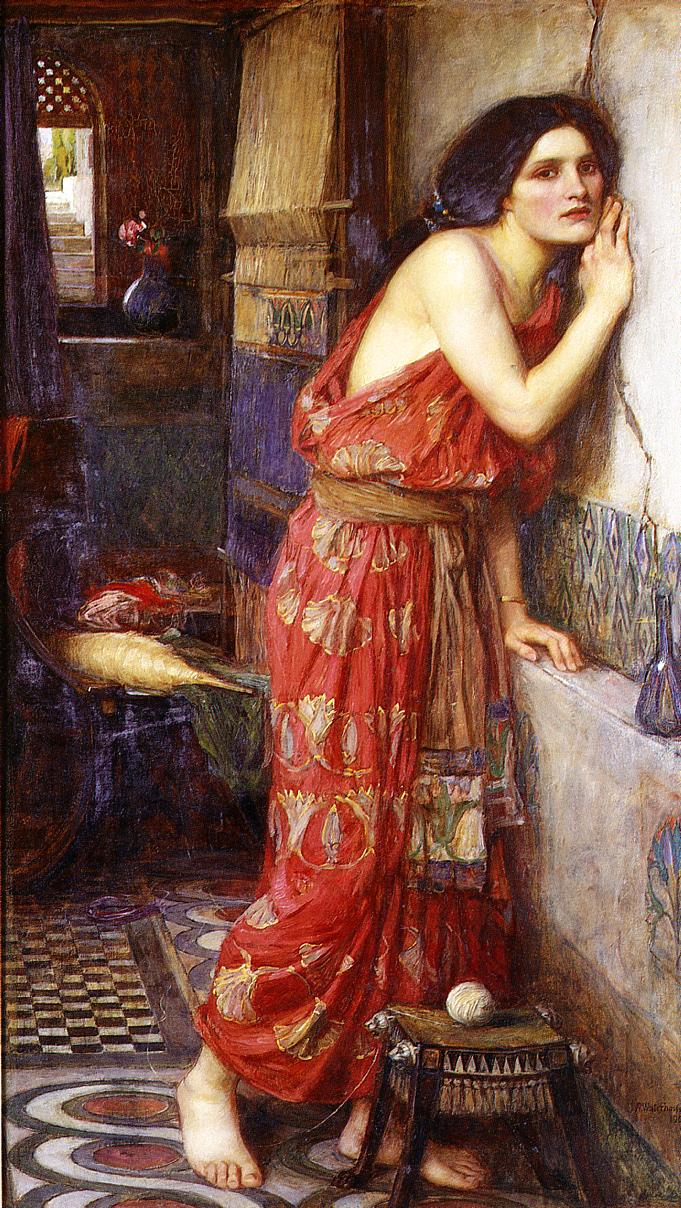
Connie Fletcher of Booklist compared Lucky and Squash to Pyramus and Thisbe, lovers in Ovid's Metamorphoses who, frustrated from being separated by a wall, conspire to run away together.

A Publishers Weekly review refers to Lucky and Squash as almost being "Emma meets Ferris Bueller's Day Off with wagging tails" and states that Birdsall's "genial, intimate storytelling instantly establishes a bond with readers". An article in Kirkus Reviews suggests that Lucky and Squash is similar to a fairy tale in its narrative structure, language, and romantic wedding scene conclusion. This reviewer summarizes Lucky and Squash as a "gentle, entertaining story... good for dog lovers and romantics alike".

In a School Library Journal article, Anne Beier of the Hendrick Hudson Free Library in Montrose, New York gives the book a positive review, praising Birdsall's writing and describing the story as funny, sweet, heartwarming, and suspenseful. Beier especially praises the climactic scene of the dogs' capture by the bear, writing that the repeated story arc of running away is strong as a result of the increased tension. She calls the dog characters endearing and writes, "This title will be a hit at storytime or in a one-on-one setting". Connie Fletcher of Booklist also gives the book a positive review, comparing the two eponymous characters to Pyramus and Thisbe, two lovers in Ovid's poem Metamorphoses. In her review, Fletcher calls the book "a fun canine fantasy with humor, excitement, a happy ending, and, most important of all, two ridiculously adorable dogs that end up getting their way - as dogs tend to do".

The Publishers Weekly reviewer is critical of Dyer's illustrations, arguing that they do not provide the two dogs with sufficiently differing personalities. The reviewer calls the illustrations "pretty and sweet", but argues that they are too understated in their depiction of the dogs going on improbable adventures, such as snorkeling at the beach and riding in a hansom cab in Manhattan.

Other reviews of the book's illustrations were positive. Beier writes highly of the illustrations and states that Dyer's paintings of the dogs' faces are priceless, particularly in the scenes where they are looking at each other through the fence and those where they are in their owners' arms. Similarly, the Kirkus reviewer calls the illustrations charming and writes that they "have all the clever details that are Dyer's signature touch", noting specifically the lavender frames of Miss Violet's eyeglasses and the inclusion of the dogs' names on their collars. Fletcher suggests that, apart from the "ominous grays and greens" in the illustrations of the forest scenes with the bear, the pastel-colored illustrations in the book are evocative of 1940s picture postcards, which she considers "just right for such jolly capers".

== Bibliography ==
- Birdsall, Jeanne (2012). Lucky and Squash. Harper. ISBN 978-0060831509.
- Ovid (2011). Stanley Lombardo (ed.). The Essential Metamorphoses. Hackett Publishing Company. ISBN 978-1603846646.
- Ross, Josephine (2002). Jane Austen: A Companion. Rutgers University Press. ISBN 081353299X.
- Sarvady, Andrea; Jamie Bennett (2004). The Ultimate Girls' Movie Survival Guide: What to Rent, Who to Watch, How to Deal. Simon & Schuster. ISBN 0689873735.
