= Ethel Barrett =

American Christian author and storyteller

Ethel Barrett (December 28, 1913 – May 10, 1998) was a Christian writer, speaker and storyteller, whose popularity peaked between the early 1950s and the mid-1980s. She sold millions of copies of over 40 different books for publishers like Gospel Light, Regal Books, and Zondervan. She also performed on 30 audio records and tapes. Currently, Barrett Enterprises LLC is the owner and caretaker of her intellectual property and is currently digitizing her writings and productions to preserve the archive and availability.

== Biography ==
Barrett started her storytelling career as a Sunday School teacher in Schenectady, New York in the early 1940s. She was asked to teach the Boys Brigade class, made up of the most unruly boys in the area. She had so much trouble keeping their attention that she began telling Bible stories using character voices and full dialog to capture their attention. That Sunday School class became a great success and her local fame and storytelling talent landed her some weekend radio jobs where she would tell Bible stories on local Christian radio stations.

Barrett's most recognized works included the retelling of John Bunyan's Holy War: "The War for Mansoul, A John Bunyon Classic As Told By Ethel Barrett," published previously as "Holy War, With Apologies to John Bunyon," and "The Chronicles of Mansoul." "Storytelling – It's Easy" which had more than 21 different printings. Don't Look Now sold over 80,000 copies, The Secret Sign sold over 165,000, Will the Real Phony Please Stand Up over 150,000 and There I Stood in All My Splendor 640,000.

Barrett was nominated for a Grammy Award in 1978 in the "Best Record for Children" category for "Ethel Barrett Tells Favorite Bible Stories" and was posthumously awarded the Great Christian Storyteller Award for the last 100 years at the Christian Storytelling Convention in 2007.

== Select bibliography ==
- Abraham: The First of His Name, (eBook available on Amazon)
- David: Shepherd, Fugitive, King (eBook available on Amazon)
- John Welch: The Man Who Couldn't be Stopped
- Barrett : A Street Cop Who Cared
- Don't Look Now, But Your Personality is Showing
- Ethel Barrett Tells Favorite Bible Stories
- Ethel Barrett Tells Bible Stories to Children Volume 1
- Ethel Barrett Tells Bible Stories to Children Volume 2
- Fanny Crosby (includes hymns and music)
- God and a Boy Named Joe
- God, Have You Got It all Together?
- If I had a Wish
- It Didn't Just Happen, and Other Talk-About Bible Stories
- It Only Hurts When I Laugh: A Letter from Peter
- Our Family's First Bible Storybook
- Peace and Quiet and Other Hazards
- The People Who Couldn't be Stopped
- Rules, Who Needs Them?
- The Secret Sign
- Steve Paxon: Can't Lose for Winning
- Storytelling, It's Easy
- "The Strangest Thing Happened..."
- There I Stood in All My Splendor
- The War for Mansoul: A John Bunyan Classic As Told by Ethel Barrett
  This book has been revised and renamed a few times:
  - Ethel Barrett's Holy War: with Apologies to John Bunyan (1969)
  - The Great Conflict: The Story of Satan's Struggle for Possession of Your Soul (1970)
  - Chronicles of Mansoul: A John Bunyan Classic (1980)
  - The War for Mansoul: A John Bunyan Classic (1998)
- What Makes a Teenager Say, "Sometimes I Feel Like a Blob"
- Which Way to Nineveh
- Will the Real Phony Please Stand Up?

=== Great Heroes of the Bible series ===
- Abraham: God's Faithful Pilgrim (2nd Edition now available as Abraham: The First of His Name)
- David: The Giant Slayer (2nd Edition now available as David: Shepherd, Fugitive, King
- The Disappearing Prophets and Other Stories About Elijah and Elisha
- Doomed or Delivered and Other Stories about Daniel
- Joseph
- Journey into the Unknown and Other Stories About Joshua
- The Man Struck Down by Light and Other Stories About Paul
- Master of Mystery and Dreams: Daniel
- Men of Mystery and Miracles: Elijah and Elisha
- Moses, Mission Impossible
- Paul: One Man's Extraordinary Adventures
- Peter, the Story of a Deserter Who Became a Forceful Leader
- Ruth

=== Stories to Grow On series ===
Many of these were released as audiobooks and 2-in-1 volumes

- Blister Lamb: Learning to Obey
- Buzz Bee: Learning Respect for Authority
- Cracker: The Horse Who Lost his Temper
- Gregory the Grub: Learning about Eternal Life
- Ice, Water, and Snow
- Muffy and the Mystery of the Stolen Eggs: Learning Honesty and Truthfulness
- Quacky and Wacky: Learning You are Special
- Sylvester, the Three-Spined Stickleback: Learning the Importance of Being Unselfish

==== Second series ====
- Jasper the Jealous Dog Learns the Value of Friendship
- Puff the Uppity Ant Learns the Value of Helping and Cooperation
- Smarty the Adventurous Fly Learns Not to Wander too Far From Home
- Sunny the Greedy Goat Learns the Value of Self-Control
