= Skinner's Brewery =

Brewery in Cornwall, England

Skinner's
- Industry: Alcoholic beverage
- Founded: 1997
- Founder: Steve Skinner
- Headquarters: Truro, Cornwall
- Number of locations: United Kingdom
- Products: Beer
- Number of employees: 30 (2011)
- Website: www.skinnersbrewery.com

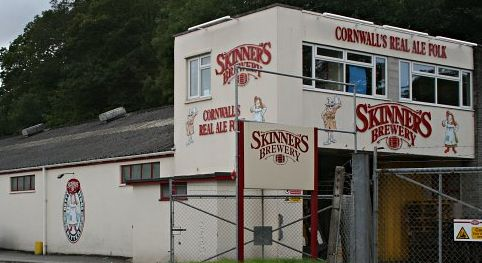
Skinner's Brewery

Skinner's is a British brewery founded in 1997 by Steve Skinner in Truro, Cornwall, England.

The company produces cask ales and bottled beers, the names of which often come from Cornish folklore. Several ales have a connection to surfing culture, such as Skin Dog Cornish lager, which is named after the owner's son, Ben "Skindog" Skinner who is a surfer. Several beers have won Campaign for Real Ale (CAMRA) and SIBA awards. The company's pub, the Skinner's Ale House in Newquay, was sold, and is now called Leadbelly's. Skinners' new pub, The Old Ale House in Truro, serves their own ales, regular guest beers and ciders.

In 2010–11, the company closed two of its sites at Chacewater and Devoran after purchasing a 10,000 sq ft (930 m^{2}) site next to its headquarters for storage and distribution.

On 30 September 2022, the company announced via social media that it would enter administration from 3 October 2022.

== Beers ==
Skinner's Brewery cask ale range includes:

Name	ABV	Description
Betty Stogs	4.0%	Skinners' best selling beer which, according to the company, has won more local and national awards than any other Cornish beer. It is named after Betty Stogs from Cornish folklore, who was a native of West Cornwall and described as unkempt and lazy, could not cook or knit and liked a drop of ale. It won the CAMRA prize for Champion Best Bitter in 2008.
Heligan Honey	4.0%	A light, refreshing bitter with a pale amber colour and hoppy overtones. Honey is added at the end of the brewing process to give it a subtle flavour.
Ginger Tosser	3.8%	A hoppy golden session beer.
Cornish Knocker	4.5%	Skinner's say this was one of the original golden ales and remains one of the most popular. It is flowery and fruity with malty undertones and a clean, lasting bittersweet finish.
Keel Over	4.2%	A classic mid-strength Cornish amber bitter.
Figgys Brew	4.5%	Named after the infamous Lands End ship-wrecker Madgy Figgy, it is the maltiest of Skinners' regular beers and slightly darker in colour. It is a premium strength ale.
Spriggan Ale	3.8%	A light golden session bitter.
Porthleven	4.8%	A special edition strong pale ale, available on draught during the summer.

Skinner's range of seasonal ales include:

Name	ABV	Description
St Piran's Ale	4.5%	St Piran's is named after the patron saint of Cornwall and is a strong golden ale made with Styrian Golding hops which give it a distinct flowery aroma.
Cornish Trawler	3.6%	Skinners' New Year golden ale is a hoppy session ale with hints of citrus and sweet malts. It is available on draught every January and February.
Splendid Tackle	4.2%	A golden ale brewed specially for the six nations rugby tournament every February and March.
Hunny Bunny	4.5%	A strong golden ale originally brewed only for Easter, but now all year round, flavoured with Cornish honey.
Kernow King	4.3%	A light golden ale.
Green Hop	4.2%	A pale coloured bitter brewed in September using freshly harvested wet hops.
Pennycomequick	4.5%	Brewed in October and named after Falmouth's original name, Pennycomequick is Skinners stout.
Cornish Scream	4.3%	A copper ale brewed for Halloween.
Betty's Big Sister	5.3%	A strong winter ale brewed from October and throughout the winter.
Christmas Fairy	3.9%	A light, crisp session ale made for Christmas.
Jingle Knocker	5.5%	Skinner's strong Christmas ale.
Cornish Blonde	5.0%	Straw coloured wheat beer with a subtle citrus finish.
Skindog Lager	4.4%	A light Cornish lager named after the Skinners' son, Ben "Skindog" Skinner.
Lushingtons	4.2%	One of Skinners' latest beers, is a fruity pale ale named after a popular Cornish surf break in Porthtowan (or Porth Tewyn in Cornish). Made using a blend of three unusual hops from the US, including Belma which is a new hop being used for the first time in the UK.

Past seasonal and speciality ales include:

- Poppy Ale (4.2%)
- Mousehole Moonshine (4.3%)
- Pint of Two-Halves (4.6%)
- Riggin' Ale (4.5%)
- Royal Wave (4.4%)
- Sennen (3.8%)
- New Year's Resolution (5.5%)
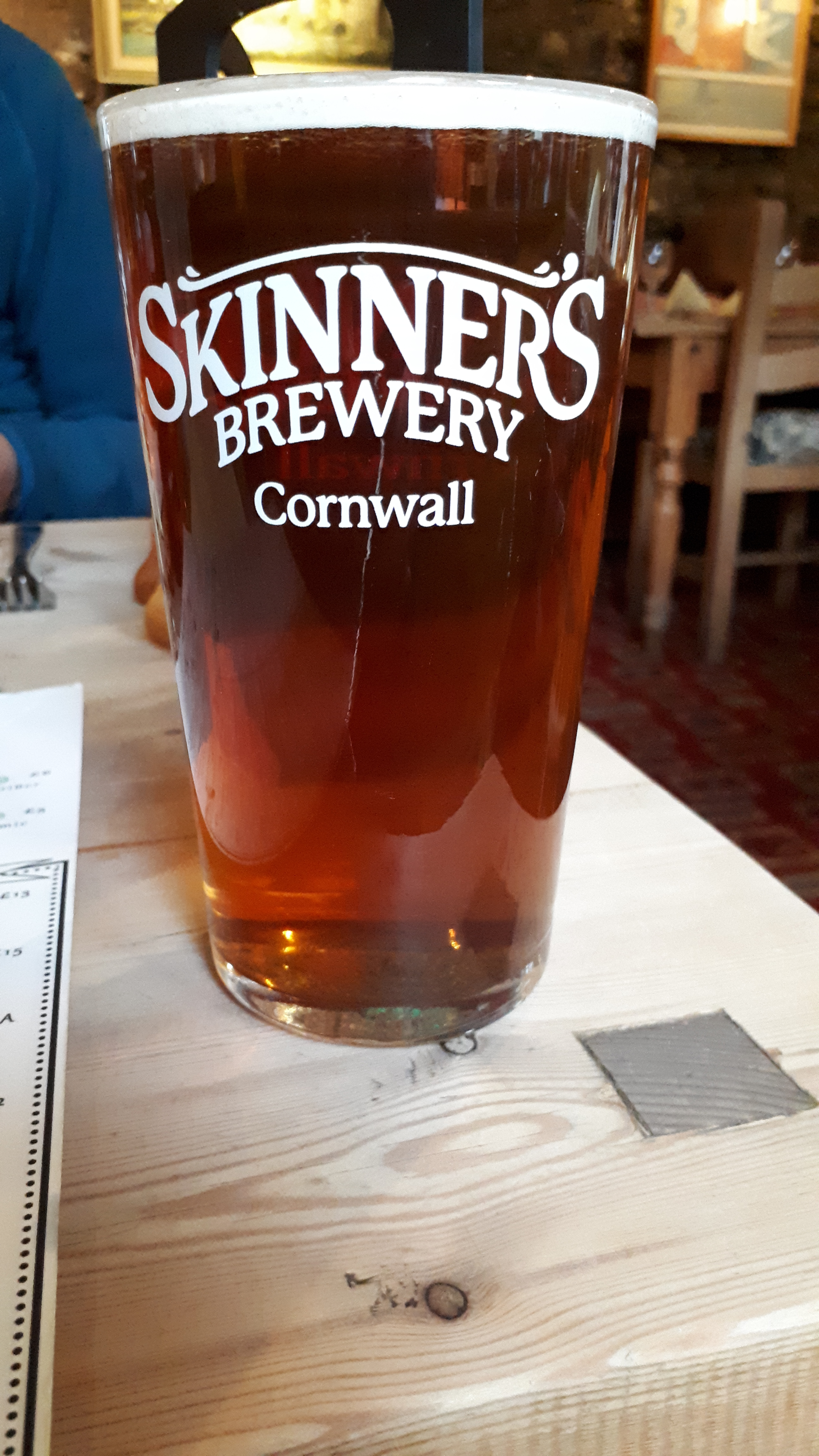
Pint of bitter

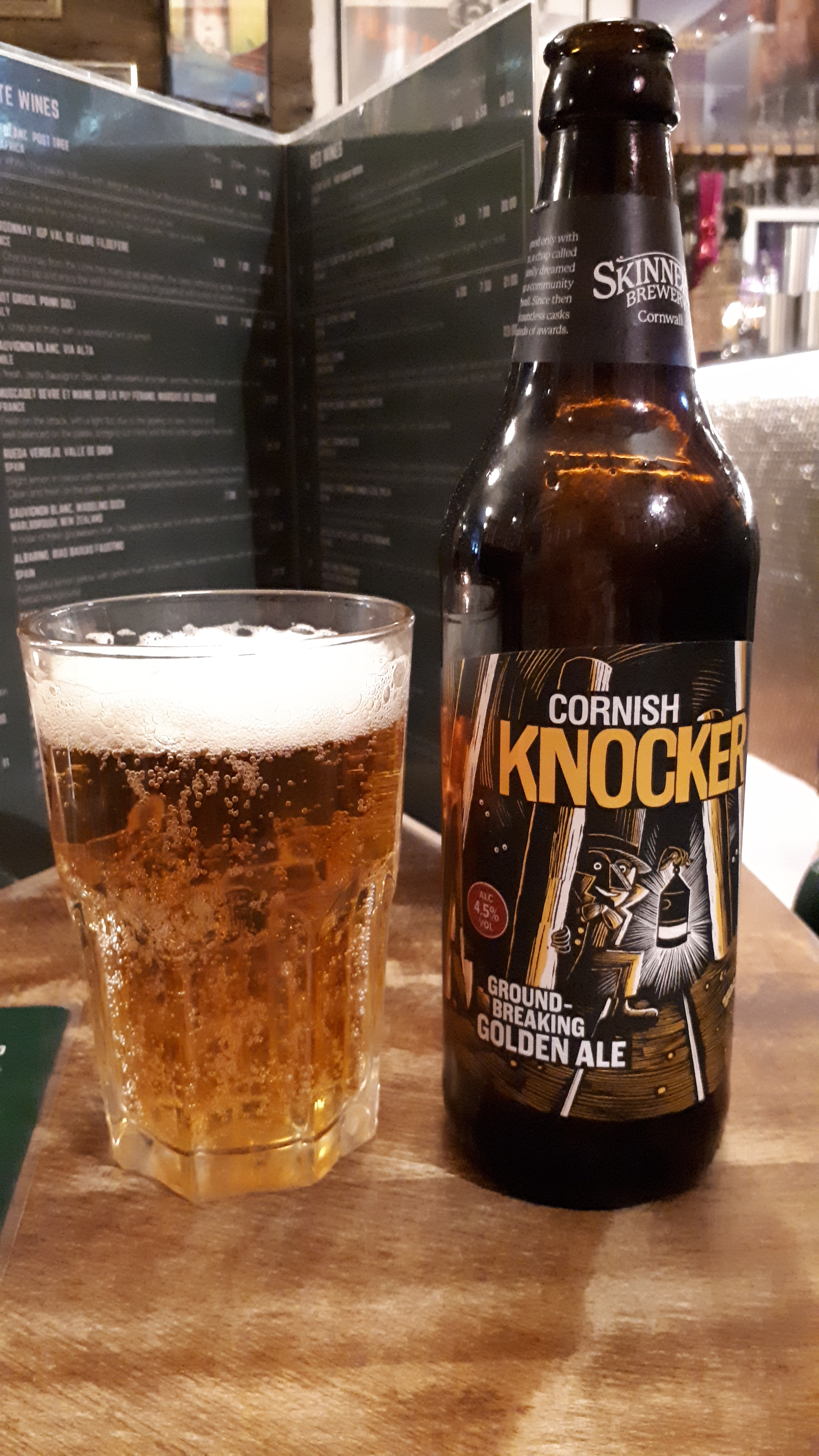
Cornish Knocker

== See also ==
- List of breweries in England
