= Duck! Rabbit! =

2009 children's picture book by Amy Krouse Rosenthal

- Author: Amy Krouse Rosenthal
- Illustrator: Tom Lichtenheld
- Cover artist: Tom Lichtenheld
- Language: English
- Genre: Children's picture book
- Published: 2009 (Chronicle Books)
- Publication place: United States of America
- Media type: Print (hardback)
- Pages: 32 (unpaginated)
- ISBN: 978-0-8118-6865-5
- OCLC: 756493381

Duck! Rabbit! is a 2009 children's picture book written by Amy Krouse Rosenthal and illustrated by Tom Lichtenheld. Published by Chronicle Books, it follows two narrators as they debate whether an illustration is a picture of a duck or a rabbit.

== Reception ==
In a New York Times article discussing some of Rosenthal's books Bruce Handy wrote "As for the wonderful “Duck! Rabbit!” it is the funniest children’s book ever based on a 19th-century-style optical illusion (or more properly, the Internet tells me, “ambiguous figure”).". BookPage wrote "The text is easy and accessible for the earliest reader, but the ideas are intellectually satisfying for the adults who want to join the fun."

Duck! Rabbit! has also been reviewed by Kirkus Reviews, Publishers Weekly, Common Sense Media, Booklist, School Library Journal, The Horn Book Magazine, and Library Media Connection

== Awards and nominations ==
It is a Junior Library Guild selection, a 2010 American Library Association Notable Children's Book, the 2012 Grand Canyon Reader Award Picture Book winner, 2011 Beehive Awards Picture Book winner, Runner-up for the 2012 Monarch Award, one of the 2010 Baker’s Dozen (13 best books for Family Literacy), and appears on the 2010 Texas 2x2 Reading List,

== See also ==
- Rabbit–duck illusion
- Optical illusion
