= Bedtime for Mommy =

2006 children's book by Amy Krouse Rosenthal

Bedtime for Mommy is a children's book written by Amy Krouse Rosenthal and illustrated by LeUyen Pham. It is published by Bloomsbury Books. It is about a little girl who is trying to get her mother to fall asleep. Kirkus Reviews described the book as "A wry role-reversal tale".

It is the basis of the film Family Switch.

== Reception ==
Kirkus Reviews argued that the concept is "executed very well here."

Publishers Weekly wrote that the book is "clever" but that "there isn't much to invite repeated readings." The review stated that the child acting like a parent in contrast to the "recognizably childish" behavior of the parent "is most likely to strike a chord with kids."

Carolyn Janssen of the Public Library of Cincinnati and Hamilton County described the writing as "witty" and the artwork as "perky" and "comical", as well as that the artwork is "humorously extending" the writing. According to Janssen, the book would appeal to girls.
