= Cookies: Bite-Size Life Lessons =

2006 children's book by Amy Krouse Rosenthal

- Cover
- Author: Amy Krouse Rosenthal
- Illustrator: Jane Dyer
- Cover artist: Jane Dyer
- Language: English
- Subject: Cookies; Life skills Trait theory
- Genre: Picture book
- Published: 2006 (HarperCollins)
- Publication place: United States
- ISBN: 006058081X
- OCLC: 60557457
- Dewey Decimal: 179/.9
- LC Class: BJ1595.R57 2006
- Followed by: Christmas Cookies: Bite-Size Holiday Lessons

Cookies: Bite-Size Life Lessons is a 2006 picture book by Amy Krouse Rosenthal intended to communicate life skills. Jane Dyer, who had previously illustrated Mem Fox's Time for Bed, illustrated Cookies with watercolor paintings of scenes such as picnics and old-fashioned kitchens. The book uses situations relating to cookies as a pretext for defining a variety of traits. Cookies is appropriate for children ages 4 to 8. The book made The New York Times Best Seller list. In The Winners! Handbook: A Closer Look at Judy Freeman's Top-rated Children's Books of 2006, Freeman describes Cookies as "old-fashioned sweet, without being cloying or didactic". In 2008, Rosenthal and Dyer released a sequel called Christmas Cookies: Bite-Size Holiday Lessons.

== Bibliography ==
- Freeman, Judy (2007). The Winners! Handbook: A Closer Look at Judy Freeman's Top-rated Children's Books of 2006. ABC-CLIO. ISBN 978-1591585107.
- Fuhrken, Charles (2009). What Every Elementary Teacher Needs to Know about Reading Tests (from Someone who Has Written Them). Stenhouse Publishers. ISBN 978-1571107640.
- Rose-Duckworth, Roxann; Karin Ramer (2008). Fostering Learner Independence: An Essential Guide for K-6 Educators. Sage Publications. ISBN 978-1412966078.
- Rosenthal, Amy Krouse (2006). Cookies: Bite-Size Life Lessons. HarperCollins. ISBN 006058081X.
