= Jago (illustrator) =

British illustrator (born 1979)

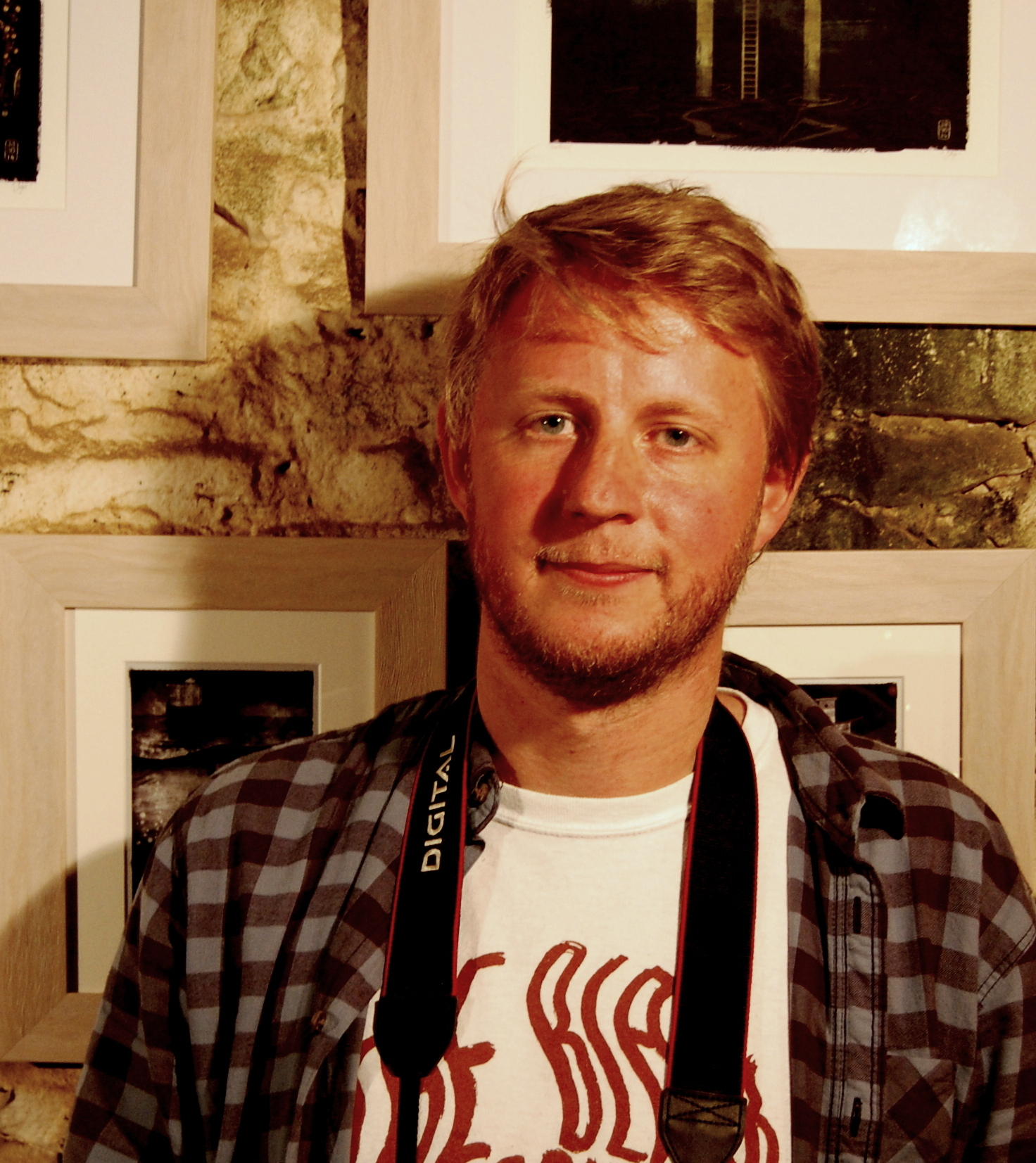
- Jago at The Cruel & Curious Sea exhibition 2014
- Born: 12 November 1979 (age 45); Exeter, England
- Occupation: Children's book illustrator
- Known for: illustrating Jesus Story Book Bible

Jago (born Jago Silver on 12 November 1979) is a British children's book illustrator. He attended Falmouth College of Art from 2000 to 2003. He has produced digital illustrations for a variety of publishers: Barefoot Books, Oxford University Press, Mantra Lingua and Zondervan.

The Jesus Storybook Bible, written by Sally Lloyd-Jones and illustrated by Jago has sold two million copies in 19 languages. In 2015 it was included in the Evangelical Christian Publishers Association (ECPA) Top 100 Best-sellers list.

In September 2014 Jago exhibited commissioned work at The Cruel & Curious Sea exhibition in the National Trust maintained barns of Stowe Barton in North Cornwall.

== Awards ==
- The Jesus Storybook Bible – 2010 ALA Notable Award
- The Jesus Storybook Bible – 2009 NAPPA Award Winner
- The Jesus Storybook Bible – Gold Moonbeam Children's Book Award from Independent Publisher (2007)
- "Nachshon, Who Was Afraid to Swim" – Sydney Taylor Honour Award for Young Readers
- "Nachshon, Who Was Afraid to Swim" – National Jewish Book Award for Young Readers
- Myron's Magic Cow- selected for 2006 White Ravens
- NLA Wow! Award – 2006
- AOI Silver Award – Student Section, AOI Images 28 Annual 2004

== Published work ==
- Always Remember with Cece Meng Philomel Books 2016 ISBN 978-0399168093
- An Ambush of Tigers: A Wild Gathering of Collective Nouns with Betsy R. Rosenthal Millbrook Picture Books 2015 ISBN 978-1467714648
- Thoughts to Make Your Heart Sing with Sally Lloyd-Jones Zondervan 2012 ISBN 978-0310729938
- Mowen & The Runaway Moon (A Productions for BBC/CBeebies) 2012
- Oh No, Jonah! by Tilda Balsley Kar-Ben Publishing, 2012 ISBN 978-0761351405
- Mr Aesop's Story Shop by Bob Hartman Lion UK, 2011 ISBN 978-0745969152
- Children of God Storybook Bible Desmond Tutu (illustrated 3 stories) Zondervan ISBN 9780310719120
- The Goose that Laid the Golden Egg by Shaun Chatto Mantra Lingua 2007 ISBN 978-1846110733
- The Jesus Storybook Bible by Sally Lloyd-Jones – Zondervan, 2007 ISBN 0-310-70825-7
- The Longest Story In The World by Geraldine McCaughrean – Oxford University Press, 2007 ISBN 0-19-271962-9
- Fox Fables – Mantra Lingua, April 2006 ISBN 1-84611-019-X
- Fig’s Giant by Geraldine McCaughrean – Oxford University Press, Oct. 2005 ISBN 0-19-279130-3
- Myron’s Magic Cow by Marlene Newman – Barefoot Books, Sept. 2005 ISBN 1-84148-495-4
- Hansel and Gretel by Manju Gregory – Mantra Lingua, June 2005 ISBN 1-84444-766-9
- The Little Red Hen by LR Hen – Mantra Lingua, May 2005 ISBN 1-84444-397-3
- Tom and the Giant by Will Coleman – Brave Tales Books, May 2005
- Lutey and the Mermaid by Will Coleman – Brave Tales Books, May 2005
- Madgy Figgy’s Pig by Will Coleman -Brave Tales Books, May 2005
