= Zondervan =

Christian publishing company

- Parent company: HarperCollins
- Founded: 1931
- Founder: Peter Zondervan; Bernard Zondervan
- Country of origin: United States
- Headquarters location: Grand Rapids, Michigan
- Publication types: Books, Textbooks, Reference, Digital Books, Video
- Nonfiction topics: Christianity, Religion, Inspirational, Personal Growth, Self Help
- Fiction genres: Various
- Imprints: Zondervan Academic, Zondervan Reflective, Zonderkidz
- Owner: News Corp
- No. of employees: 100+
- Official website: www.zondervan.com

Zondervan is an international Christian media and publishing company located in Grand Rapids, Michigan, United States. Zondervan is a founding member of the Evangelical Christian Publishers Association (ECPA). It is a part of HarperCollins Christian Publishing, Inc. and has multiple imprints including Zondervan Academic, Zonderkidz, Blink, and Editorial Vida. Zondervan is the commercial rights holder for the New International Version (NIV) Bible in North America. According to the Zondervan website, it is the largest Christian publisher.

== History ==
Zondervan was founded in 1931 in Grandville, MI, a suburb of Grand Rapids, by brothers Peter ("P.J.", "Pat") and Bernard (Bernie) Zondervan, who were the nephews of publisher William B. Eerdmans. The company began in the Zondervans' farmhouse and originally dealt with selling remainders and publishing public domain works.

The first book it published was Women of the Old Testament by Abraham Kuyper, in 1933. Within a few years it developed a list of its own, and began publishing Bible editions. The Berkeley Version appeared in 1959, and the Amplified Bible in 1965. The New International Version New Testament was published in partnership with the International Bible Society in 1973, and the complete NIV Bible appeared in 1978. The company was bought by HarperCollins, a division of News Corp, in 1988, and is the company's principal Christian book publishing division. Scott Macdonald was appointed president and CEO in May 2011.

Zondervan also publishes many other books by Christian authors focusing on topics of interest to Christians. In the 1970s it published The Late, Great Planet Earth by Hal Lindsey, which has sold more than 30 million copies. The publisher is also known for the Bible storytelling books of Ethel Barrett, Joni by quadriplegic Joni Eareckson Tada, Baptist minister and author Rick Warren's The Purpose Driven Life, which has sold more than 35 million copies, and Sacred Marriage, by Gary Thomas. In 2004, Zondervan expanded to include Renee Altson, Shane Claiborne, Sarah Raymond Cunningham and Margaret Feinberg, authors writing for young readers.

The children's arm of the company Zonderkidz published The Jesus Storybook Bible in 2007, written by Sally Lloyd-Jones and illustrated by Jago. It has sold in excess of 2 million copies in 19 languages.

The NIV Zondervan Study Bible was released in 2015 during the 50th anniversary of the New International Version (NIV) translation. The study Bible, edited by Dr. D. A. Carson, features over 60 evangelical contributors from multiple denominations.

On 11 March 2019, Zondervan announced the formation of two new imprints, Zondervan Reflective and Zondervan Academic. Although both imprints ran informally at Zondervan for several years this announcement formalised their public brand.

Zondervan Reflective focuses on publishing books discussing the relationship between faith and culture, leadership, and how Christians can lead biblically faithful lives privately and in the public square. Noted authors include Andy Stanley, Clay Scroggins, J.D. Greear, Colin Hansen, Tim Challies, Michael Horton, Jared Wilson, John Lennox, Jemar Tisby, and Peter Scazzero. On 28 June 2020, Jemar Tisby's The Color of Compromise reached #13 on the New York Times Best Sellers list.

Zondervan Academic publishes reference volumes, textbooks, and monographs, for both use in schools and by many pastors. It is widely known for its biblical language resources, including the bestselling textbooks Basics of Biblical Greek, Basics of Biblical Hebrew, and many others. The imprint also publishes several popular commentary series, including the Zondervan Exegetical Commentary, Story of God Bible Commentary, and Word Biblical Commentary. Noted authors include N.T. Wright, Douglas Moo, Scot McKnight, Michael Bird, John Walton, Michael Horton, Dan Wallace, Bruce Waltke, Tremper Longman, Thomas Kidd, Craig Keener, Thomas Schreiner, Nijay Gupta, Lynn Cohick, and D.A. Carson.

== Music business ==
Zondervan was in the Christian record business for many years with the Singspiration and Zondervan Victory labels in the 1960s, Singcord in the 1970s, and the Milk & Honey Records label, starting in the late 1970s. Zondervan acquired Stamps-Baxter Music Company in 1974.

In 1980, Zondervan and Paragon Associates bought Christian record label Benson Records in a partnership to own and operate for $3 million. The resulting company was (measured by sales) one and a half times the size of its closest competitor, Word. Zondervan bought out Paragon in 1983, and eventually sold Benson's recorded music and music publishing to Zomba Label Group in 1993. The record catalog is now a part of Sony BMG Music Entertainment.

== Pradis ==
Pradis was the trademarked name for Zondervan's native format for biblical software. On September 22, 2009, Logos Research Systems, Inc, and Zondervan announced a new partnership, and the retirement of Pradis. Thirty-one titles were slated for availability in "early 2010" in the LOGOS Bible Software format.
