= Amy Krouse Rosenthal =

American author, radio host, and filmmaker (1965–2017)

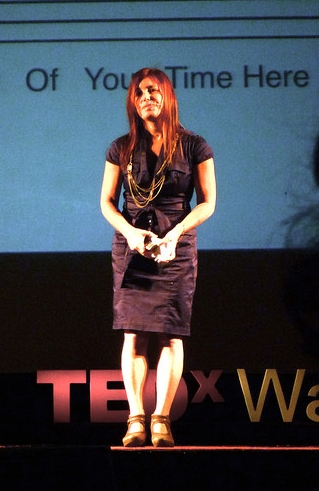
- Rosenthal speaking at the TEDx Waterloo conference, February 25, 2010
- Born: Amy Renee Krouse; April 29, 1965; Chicago, Illinois, U.S.
- Died: March 13, 2017 (aged 51); Chicago, Illinois, U.S.
- Education: Tufts University
- Occupations: Author, filmmaker
- Spouse: Jason Brian Rosenthal
- Children: 3
- Writing career
- Genre: Children's literature
- Website: whoisamy.com

Amy Krouse Rosenthal (born Amy Renee Krouse; April 29, 1965 – March 13, 2017) was an American author of both adult and children's books, a short film maker, and radio show host. She is best known for her memoir Encyclopedia of an Ordinary Life, her children's picture books, and the film project The Beckoning of Lovely. She was a prolific writer, publishing more than 30 children's books between 2005 and her death in 2017. She is the only author to have three children's books make the Best Children's Books for Family Literacy list in the same year. She was a contributor to Chicago's NPR affiliate WBEZ, and to the TED conference.

== Books ==
Amy Krouse Rosenthal wrote for both adults and children. Rosenthal had several books on the New York Times bestseller list: I Wish You More, Uni the Unicorn, Plant a Kiss, Exclamation Mark, Cookies: Bite-Size Life Lessons, and Duck! Rabbit!. Duck! Rabbit! was read at the White House during the 2010 Easter Egg Roll. She was selected as the 2015 author for 'The Global Read Aloud', an eight-week program for classrooms around the world to engage with each other by reading the same books.

Her alphabetized memoir Encyclopedia of an Ordinary Life (published in 2005) was named one of Amazon's top ten memoirs of the decade. Her follow-up, Textbook Amy Krouse Rosenthal, was published by Dutton Penguin Random House on August 9, 2016. It is the first book to include an interactive text-messaging component.

Along with her adult and children's work, Rosenthal had a keepsake journal line (ten titles in all) including Encyclopedia of Me: My Life from A to Z and The Belly Book: A Nine-Month Journal for You and Your Growing Belly.

Rosenthal's picture book Yes Day!, written by Tom Lichtenheld, has been adapted as a live-action Netflix Original film, Yes Day, released in March 2021. Another Netflix adaptation of her books, Bedtime for Mommy, was released in November 2023 as Family Switch.

== Films ==
Rosenthal made short films using her iPhone or Flip camera. Some invite further interaction from viewers, some are social experiments, and some build upon each other to become something else entirely. Her films include 17 Things I Made, Today is a Gift, ATM: Always Trust Magic, The Kindness Thought Bubble, The Money Tree and The Beckoning of Lovely.

She held 'Beckoning of Lovely' events at Cloud Gate ("The Bean") in Chicago's Millennium Park on August 8, 2008, September 9, 2009, October 10, 2010, and November 11, 2011.

Chicago Magazine described The Beckoning of Lovely:

Rosenthal's masterpiece, unfolding over the past two years, began with a YouTube video called 17 Things I Made. In it, she invited viewers to meet her on August 8, 2008 (8/8/08), at 8:08 p.m. in Millennium Park to make an 18th thing together. That thing was a party. She expected a group of maybe 30, but roughly 400 curious people showed up, surprised to find themselves singing, dancing, blowing bubbles, and giving flowers to strangers. One couple met and fell in love. "I wish there was a word less obvious than 'magical' to describe that night," Rosenthal says. "It was meaningful to everyone in some way."

— Jeff Ruby

== Other work ==
Prior to becoming an author, Amy was an award-winning advertising copywriter in Chicago.

Rosenthal was a frequent contributor to TED. In 2011, 2012, and 2015, she was brought on as an "experiential designer", creating ideas and experiences implemented at the annual TEDActive conference. Additionally, she has given talks at TEDxSanDiego 2011 and at TEDxSMU 2012; she gave her first and most well-known TED talk, 'Notes on Life', at TEDxWaterloo (Canada) in 2010.

Her essays and articles have appeared in The New York Times, Hallmark Magazine, Parenting, O: The Oprah Magazine, and McSweeney's. Her website, whoisamy.com, was named one of the best official author websites, alongside Barbara Kingsolver and Stephen King.

== Personal life ==
Rosenthal, a graduate of Tufts University, lived in Chicago. She had three children: Justin, Miles and Paris.

On March 3, 2017, at the age of 51, she announced that she was terminally ill with ovarian cancer, by way of a New York Times "Modern Love" essay. The essay was in the form of a dating profile for her husband Jason, to help him remarry after her death. "I am wrapping this up on Valentine’s Day," she wrote, "and the most genuine, non-vase-oriented gift I can hope for is that the right person reads this, finds Jason, and another love story begins." She died ten days later at her home in Chicago, where she was born.

== Children's books ==
- Little Pea, illustrated by Jen Corace, Chronicle Books, 2005.
- Little Hoot, illustrated by Jen Corace, Chronicle Books, 2009.
- Little Oink, illustrated by Jen Corace, Chronicle Books, 2009.
- The OK Book, illustrated by Tom Lichtenheld, HarperCollins, 2007.
- Spoon, illustrated by Scott Magoon, Hyperion Books For Children, 2009.
- One Of Those Days, illustrated by Rebecca Doughty, Putnam, 2005.
- Yes Day!, with Tom Lichtenheld, HarperCollins, 2009.
- It's Not Fair, illustrated by Tom Lichtenheld, HarperCollins, 2008.
- Duck! Rabbit!, with Tom Lichtenheld, Chronicle Books, 2009.
- Bedtime For Mommy, illustrated by LeUyen Pham, Bloomsbury, 2010.
- The Wonder Book, illustrated by Paul Schmid, HarperCollins, 2010.
- Cookies: Bite Size Life Lessons, illustrated by Jane Dyer, HarperCollins, 2005.
- Sugar Cookies: Sweet Little Lessons on Love, illustrated by Jane and Brooke Dyer, HarperCollins, 2010.
- One Smart Cookie: Bite-Size Life Lessons For The School Years And Beyond, illustrated by Jane and Brooke Dyer, HarperCollins, 2010.
- Al Pha's Bet, illustrated by Delphine Durand, Putnam, 2011.
- This Plus That, illustrated by Jen Corace, HarperCollins, 2011.
- Plant A Kiss, illustrated by Peter Reynolds, HarperCollins, Winter 2011.
- Chopsticks, illustrated by Scott Magoon, Disney Hyperion, 2012.
- Wumbers, illustrated by Tom Lichtenheld, Chronicle, 2012.
- Exclamation Mark!, illus. Tom Lichtenheld, Scholastic, 2013 – winner of the 2015 California Young Reader Medal, primary grades
- I Scream Ice Cream: A Book of Wordles, illustrated by Sergio Bloch, Chronicle, 2013.
- Uni the Unicorn, illustrated by Brigette Barrager, Random House, 2014.
- Little Miss, Big Sis, illustrated by Peter Reynolds, HarperCollins, 2015.
- I Wish You More, illustrated by Tom Lichtenheld, Chronicle, 2015.
- Friendshape, illustrated by Tom Lichtenheld, Scholastic, 2015.
- Awake Beautiful Child, illustrated by Gracia Lam, McSweeney's, 2015.
- That's Me Loving You, illustrated by Teagan White, Random House, 2016.
- Uni the Unicorn and the Dream Come True, illustrated by Brigette Barrager, Random House, 2017.
- Dear Girl,, with Paris Rosenthal, illustrated by Holly Hatam, 2017.
- Don’t Blink! illustrated by David Roberts, Random House, 2018.

== Adult books ==
- The Book of Eleven: An Itemized Collection of Brain Lint, Andrews McMeel, 1998.
- The Same Phrase Describes My Marriage and My Breasts: Before the Kids, They Used to Be Such a Cute Couple, Andrews McMeel, 1999.
- Mother's Guide to the Meaning of Life: What I've Learned on My Never Ending Quest to Become a Dalai Mama, Rodale Press, 2001.
- Encyclopedia of an Ordinary Life, Crown/Random House, 2005.
- Textbook Amy Krouse Rosenthal, Dutton/Penguin, 2016

== Journal line ==
- The Belly Book: A Nine Month Journal For Baby's First Year, Potter Style, 2006.
- Karma Checks: 60 Checks To Keep The World In Balance, Potter Style, 2007.
- Your Birthday Book: A Keepsake Journal, Potter Style, 2008.
- Words To Remember: A Journal For Your Child's Sweet & Amusing Sayings, illustrated by Ida Pearl, Potter Style, 2008.
- The Big Sibling Book: Baby's First Year According To Me, The Big Sib, Potter Style, 2009.
- The Grandparent Book: A Keepsake Journal, Potter Style, 2010.
- My Baby Book: A Keepsake Journal For Baby's First Year, Potter Style, 2010.
- The Bride-to-Be Book: A Journal of Memories from the Proposal to "I Do", Potter Style, 2011.
- Highlights of Your Life, with Sara Gillingham, Potter Style, 2014.
- Encyclopedia of Me: My Life from A to Z, Potter Style, 2014.
- A Week in the Life of Me, Chronicle, 2015.

== See also ==
- Book talk
- International Children's Digital Library
- List of children's literature authors
