= Sally Lloyd-Jones =

British writer

Sally Lloyd-Jones is a British children's book writer.

== Background ==
Lloyd-Jones was born in Kampala, Uganda and studied Art History with French at University of Sussex and Paris-Sorbonne University. She is not related to the famous minister Martyn Lloyd-Jones.

She worked in children's book publishing for several years at Oxford University Press before moving to the US in 1989 where she lives in Manhattan. In 2000 she began to write full-time. She is a member of Redeemer Presbyterian Church.

The children's arm of Zondervan (Zonderkidz) published The Jesus Storybook Bible in 2007, written by Sally Lloyd-Jones and illustrated by Jago, has sold 6 million copies in 85 languages. In 2015 it was included in the Evangelical Christian Publishers Association (ECPA) Top 100 Best-sellers list.

Jago also illustrated her 2012 book Thoughts to Make Your Heart Sing which was inspired by her niece who was being bullied at school.

Nashville-based artists Rain for Roots (featuring Sandra McCracken, Ellie Holcomb, Flo Paris, and Katy Bowser) based their 2012 debut album Big Stories For Little Ones putting the poems of Sally Lloyd-Jones to music.

== Awards ==
- New York Times Notable 2007 for How to Be a Baby...by Me, the Big Sister
- Evangelical Christian Publishers Association Notable Award Category: Children's Recordings 2010.
- NAPPA Award Winner 2009
- Gold Moonbeam Children's Book Award 2007
- Best Inspirational Book at the 2013 Evangelical Christian Publishers Association

== Selected books ==
- Little One We Knew You'd Come Frances Lincoln Children's Books (1 Oct 2006) ISBN 978-1845077310
- Handbag Friends David Fickling Books (6 Oct 2005) ISBN 978-0385608190
- How to Be a Baby: By Me, the Big Sister Schwartz & Wade Books (13 Feb 2007) ISBN 978-0375838439
- The Jesus Storybook Bible Zondervan, 2007 ISBN 0-310-70825-7
- Old Macnoah Had an Ark HarperCollins (Jan 2008) ISBN 978-0060557188
- The Ultimate Guide to Grandmas & Grandpas! HarperCollins (May 2008) ISBN 978-0060756871
- Time to Say Goodnight Harper Trophy (1 May 2009) ISBN 978-0060543303
- Being a Pig Is Nice: A Child's-Eye View of Manners Schwartz & Wade Books (12 May 2009) ISBN 978-0375841873
- How To Be a Baby, by Me, the Big Sister Walker (7 Sep 2009) ISBN 978-1406323337
- Baby's Hug-a-Bible HarperFestival (1 Feb 2010) ISBN 978-0061566219
- How to Get a Job by Me, the Boss Schwartz & Wade Books (10 May 2011) ISBN 978-0375866647
- Song of the Stars: A Christmas Story Zondervan (18 Oct 2011) ISBN 978-0-310-72291-5
- Thoughts to Make Your Heart Sing with Jago Zondervan (7 Sep 2012) ISBN 978-0310721635
