= Carol Heyer =

American illustrator and children's writer

- Born: February 2, 1950 (age 76)
- Known for: Fantasy art

Carol Ann Heyer (born February 2, 1950) is an American illustrator and children's writer. Her three works most widely held in WorldCat libraries are picture books written by Henry Winkler.

== Early life and education ==
Heyer was born on February 2, 1950. Her parents are William J. Heyer and Merlyn M. Heyer. She attended Moorpark College, followed by California Lutheran University.

== Career ==
Heyer has contributed many illustrations to speculative fiction magazines and anthologies, primarily during the 1990s. She has illustrated role-playing game materials for Dungeons & Dragons, including the AD&D second edition Tome of Magic and Legends & Lore.

She is known for her work on the collectible card game Magic: The Gathering.

She co-wrote the screenplay for the 1986 action film Thunder Run.

She also creates children's picture books. Once Upon a Cool Motorcycle Dude, published by Walker Books in 2005, won the annual Monarch Award in 2009 by vote of Illinois schoolchildren in grades K–3. The story by Kevin O'Malley features a "folktale" by two children, created in the schoolroom as they tell it alternately and uncooperatively. O'Malley illustrated the frame story while Heyer and Scott Goto portrayed the segments created by the schoolgirl (Heyer, "Princess Tenderheart ... in flowing silk gowns and blonde tresses") and schoolboy (Goto, the Dude and a giant introduced in "testosterone-soaked oils"). "The unusual collaboration among illustrators works seamlessly", according to Kirkus. The same authors created a sequel, Once Upon a Royal Superbaby (Walker, 2010), featuring the son of now-Queen Tenderheart and the Motorcycle Dude. OCLC 504222991

The picture books both written and illustrated by Heyer are Christmas and Easter stories, primarily, and re-tellings of fairy tales and legends.
