= The Big Picture Story Bible =

2004 children's Bible published by Crossway

- Author: David R. Helm
- Illustrator: Gail Schoonmaker
- Language: English
- Publisher: Crossway
- Publication date: 2004
- Publication place: United States
- Pages: 456
- ISBN: 978-1581342772

The Big Picture Story Bible is a 2004 children's Bible published by Crossway. It was written by David R. Helm and illustrated by Gail Schoonmaker. It focuses on the "overall story of God’s saving plan" instead of concentrating on individual stories, and is heavily influenced by Graeme Goldsworthy's biblical theology, especially his motif of "God's people in God's place under God's rule."

David A. Shaw notes that the illustrations "are full of biblical detail, supplementing a more stylised and generalised text," and "make visual connections very effectively, linking OT promises and typological patterns with their fulfilment."

Crossway has also published a number of associated volumes, including The Big Picture Family Devotional and The Big Picture Bible Crafts.

== See also ==
- The Jesus Storybook Bible
