= Jeanne Birdsall =

American writer of children's books

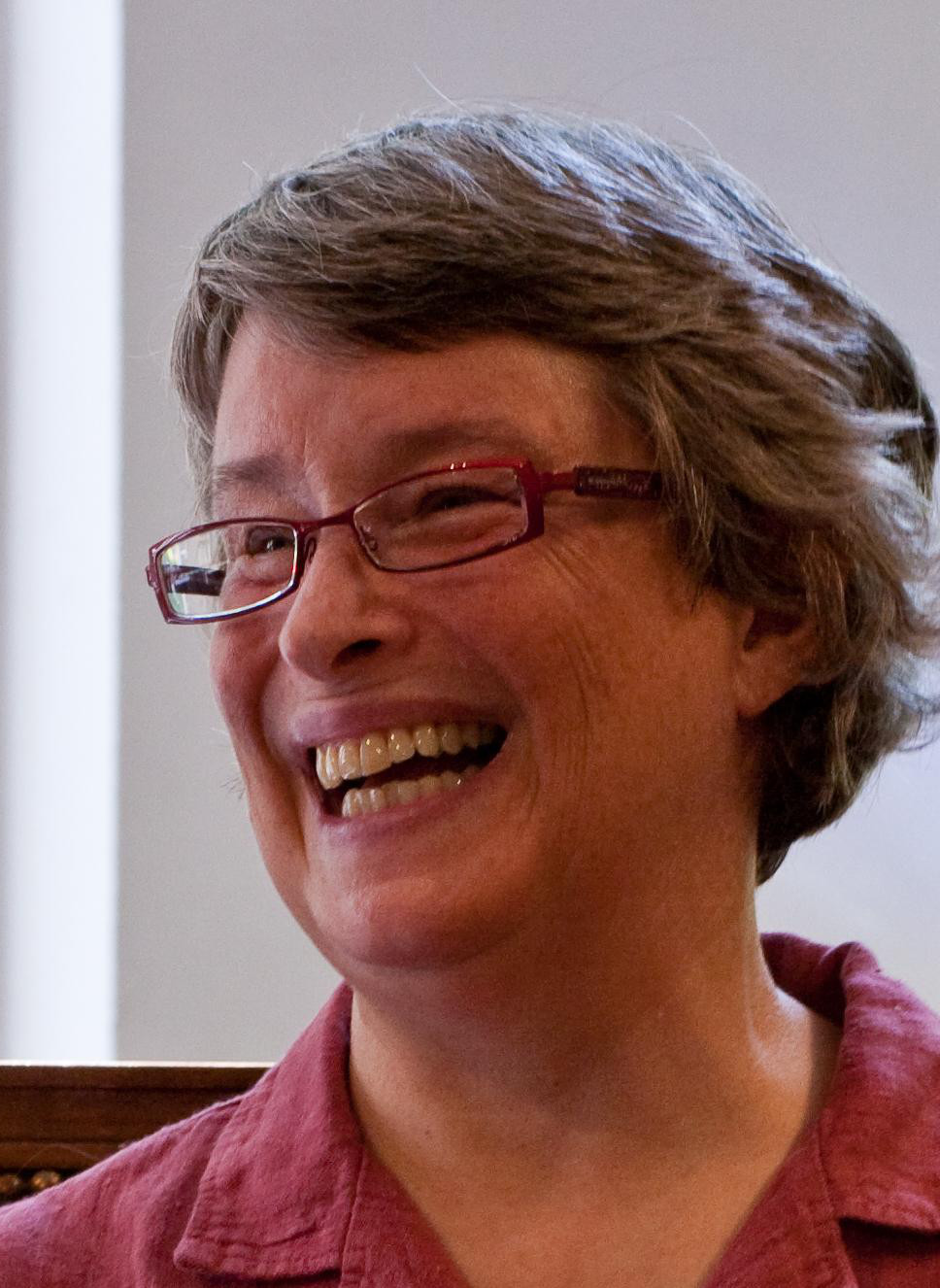
- Jeanne Birdsall in 2009
- Born: 1951 (age 74–75); Philadelphia, Pennsylvania, U.S.
- Education: Boston University; California College of Arts and Crafts
- Occupations: Novelist, photographer
- Writing career
- Language: English
- Period: 2005–present
- Genres: Children's literature, adventure novels
- Notable work: The Penderwicks
- Notable awards: National Book Award; 2005
- Website: jeannebirdsall.com

Jeanne Birdsall (born 1951) is an American photographer and writer of children's books. She is best known for her five-volume series about the Penderwick family. The Penderwicks, the first book in the series, won the 2005 National Book Award for Young People's Literature.

== Life ==
Birdsall was born in Philadelphia, Pennsylvania and grew up in the suburbs. Birdsall has one sibling, a sister who is four years older than her. She decided to become a writer at the age of ten, but she didn't start until she was forty-one. She worked first on other jobs, most notably as a photographer, and some of her work has been displayed in galleries around the world.

Birdsall's first book, The Penderwicks: A Summer Tale of Four Sisters, Two Rabbits, and a Very Interesting Boy, was published when she was 54 and won the 2005 National Book Award.

== Books ==
- The Penderwicks: A Summer Tale of Four Sisters, Two Rabbits, and a Very Interesting Boy (Alfred A. Knopf, 2005) —winner of the National Book Award
- The Penderwicks on Gardam Street (Knopf, 2008)
- Flora's Very Windy Day (Clarion/Houghton Mifflin, 2010), children's picture book illustrated by Matt Phelan
- The Penderwicks at Point Mouette (Knopf, 2011)
- Lucky and Squash (Harper/HarperCollins, 2012), picture book illus. Jane Dyer
- The Penderwicks in Spring (Knopf, 2015)
- My Favorite Pets: by Gus W. for Ms. Smolinski's Class (Knopf, 2016), picture book illus. Harry Bliss
- The Penderwicks At Last (Knopf, 2018)
- The Library of Unruly Treasures (Knopf, 2025)

== Collections ==
- Philadelphia Museum of Art
- Smithsonian American Art Museum
