= Anne de Graaf =

Children's writer

- Born: January 17, 1959 (age 67); San Francisco, USA
- Citizenship: Dutch
- Education: Stanford University; University of St. Andrews (Ph.D.)
- Occupation: Professor Chief Diversity Officer Author
- Partner: Erik de Graaf
- Children: Julia de Graaf, Daniel de Graaf
- Writing career
- Genre: International Historical Fiction International Intrigue Fiction Children's Christian
- Notable works: Out of the Red Shadow, Dance Upon the Sea
- Notable awards: 2000 Christy Award, 2007 East European Christian Children's Book Award
- Website: annedegraaf.com

Anne de Graaf (born 1959) is an American-born Dutch academic, diversity advocate and is the author of over 80 books, with 5 million sold worldwide. She has won the International Historical Fiction Christy Award in 2000 for Out of the Red Shadow, the final book of her Hidden Harvest series, and the East European Christian Children's Book Award in 2007 for Dance Upon the Sea. Anne de Graaf currently teaches Human Rights and Human Security; and Peace Lab at Amsterdam University College and serves as the Chief Diversity Officer at the University of Amsterdam.

Anne de Graaf was born in San Francisco, graduated from Stanford University, and received her PhD in International Relations from the University of St. Andrews. Her doctoral thesis, Speaking Peace into Being: Voice, Youth And Agency in a Deeply Divided Society, focused on the impact of the youth in post-conflict nations. Anne has lived in Ireland and the Netherlands with her husband and their two children. Besides her work as an author, lecturer and Chief Diversity Officer, de Graaf has also worked as a journalist for the Dutch National Press Club, and as an economics translator for the Dutch government. She is a member of the British Society of Authors in London and the Rotary Club Westland-Polanen in The Netherlands.

== Awards ==
- Out of the Red Shadow, Christy Award in 2000
- Dance Upon the Sea, 2nd prize for East European Christian Children's Book Award in 2007
- TEDxAUCollege, The Children's Voices, 2015
