= The Penderwicks at Point Mouette =

2011 children's novel by Jeanne Birdsall

- First edition
- Author: Jeanne Birdsall
- Language: English
- Genre: Fiction
- Publisher: Alfred A. Knopf
- Publication date: May 11, 2011
- Publication place: United States
- Pages: 304
- ISBN: 9-780-37585-8512
- OCLC: 1028096792
- Preceded by: The Penderwicks on Gardam Street
- Followed by: The Penderwicks in Spring

The Penderwicks at Point Mouette is a children's novel by Jeanne Birdsall, published by Knopf in 2011. It is the third book in The Penderwicks series, and is preceded by The Penderwicks on Gardam Street. The remaining books in the series are The Penderwicks in Spring and The Penderwicks at Last, the last of them being published in 2018.

The main setting of the book, Point Mouette, is based on Ocean Point, near Boothbay Harbor in Maine.

== Plot ==
It’s summer vacation, and the Penderwick family is splitting apart for two weeks. Mr. Penderwick and his new wife Iantha are off to England for a work conference slash honeymoon with Iantha’s toddler son Ben. Oldest sister Rosalind, meanwhile, is going to New Jersey with her best friend Anna, leaving a reluctant Skye as OAP (Oldest Available Penderwick) on her, Jane, Batty, and Hound’s trip to the fictional beach town of Point Mouette with Aunt Claire. Skye doubts her ability to be as good an OAP as Rosalind, especially when it comes to caring for Batty.

When they arrive at Point Mouette, the sisters are delighted to find that their good friend Jeffrey will be joining them, but upset when Aunt Claire injures her ankle in a fall from a seawall. With support from their next-door-neighbor Alec, a musician whose badly behaved dog Hoover was the reason for Aunt Claire’s fall, the Penderwicks and Jeffrey agree to take on extra responsibilities so as not to let Aunt Claire’s injury ruin their trip. They soon befriend Mercedes Orne, a girl near Batty’s age whose grandparents run the town’s inn. Jane, who is trying to write a book about love, develops a crush on Mercedes’ skateboarder brother Dominic.

Skye becomes intensely distrustful of Dominic after Jane smashes her nose with a rock in an attempt to wave to him, but the whole family quickly grows fond of Alec, especially Jeffrey, who looks up to him as a fellow musician. The Penderwicks also meet Turron, Alec’s drummer friend, who suggests that Batty hold a concert for the others on the last day of their stay, as she has taken a great interest in music. The whole group roast marshmallows together and each of the children make a wish to the “Firegod” - Jane that she will have material for her book, Jeffrey that his unknown father will be just like Alec, Batty for a piano, and Skye that everyone else’s wish will come true except the piano.

After Dominic kisses Jane in the local park, she writes him an ode, which he returns to her with a note saying “It didn’t mean anything.” A distressed Jane proceeds to give herself a horrific haircut. Skye, regretful of what she sees as failing in her OAP duties, goes with her to the hair salon, where she, Batty, and Mercedes get short haircuts to match her and Alec shaves off his beard. Inspired, Jane makes Dominic the villainous subject of her next book, entitled “Sabrina Starr Rescues the Heartbreaker.”

Now that Alec has shaved his beard, all of them think he reminds them of someone. When Jane and Skye realize that it is Jeffrey, Alec shows Skye his childhood photos, which confirm the resemblance. Skye tells Alec the name of Jeffrey’s mother, and Alec is shocked to realize that he had been married to her years ago. He drives off to confront her, and Skye and Aunt Claire keep the secret until Alec returns with the knowledge that he is indeed Jeffrey’s father, having had no idea of his existence.

Initially, Jeffrey reacts with anger at this revelation, blaming his father for their missed time together, but he refuses to return home until the Penderwick vacation is over. At Batty’s concert on their last day, he forgives Alec and they embrace. Batty, meanwhile, excels on the piano, countering the Penderwick assumption that they are a uniformly unmusical family. Aunt Claire and Alec drive the group back home to Massachusetts, where they happily reunite with the rest of their family and a grateful Skye surrenders OAP-dom to Rosalind.

== Reception ==
Like its predecessors in the series, The Penderwicks at Point Mouette featured on The New York Times bestseller list. Kirkus Reviews wrote that "readers who enjoyed the previous books...will like this one, too, because of its cozy familiarity, and Birdsall writes with a warm, sure hand." Publishers Weekly agreed, saying, "The Penderwick sisters' third adventure brings them back in full entertaining force...From start to finish, this is a summer holiday to savor."
