= Vance Powell =

American record producer

Vance Powell is an American six-time Grammy Award winning record producer, engineer and mixer. His credits include Phish, Chris Stapleton, Jack White, Tyler Bryant & The Shakedown, The Raconteurs, The Dead Weather, The White Stripes, Arctic Monkeys, Wolfmother, Deadly Apples, Seasick Steve, Black Prairie, The Revivalists, Tinariwen, JEFF the Brotherhood, Illiterate Light, Daniel Ellsworth & The Great Lakes, and Martina McBride, among many others.

== Life and career ==
Powell made his start in live sound, touring with local Missouri bands as a front of house engineer. In 1986, he conducted his first professional studio recording session as an engineer at Rick Massey's 'Massey Studio', stepping in for the main engineer who was sick at the time. That same year he became the studio's engineer. In 1990-'93 he took a position at Lou Whitney's Column One Studio in Springfield, MO. as second engineer, recording scores of regional bands and artists. Shortly after, Powell moved to Nashville, TN, accepting a position as a monitor engineer for Tammy Wynette. The position turned into Production Manager/Front of House (FOH) Engineer, which he did until 1997, when he joined global sound reinforcement company, Clair Brothers Audio.

In 1998, he started a long relationship with Jars of Clay; he took a front of house position that continued through 2002. During that time several recording projects with them emerged, including their full length 2002 release (and 2003 Grammy Award winner) "The Eleventh Hour".

In early 2002, John McBride asked him to help build and run Blackbird Studio, a single room semi-private facility for his wife, country music superstar Martina McBride. The single room semi-private facility soon became an eight-room world class facility hosting projects such as Neil Young's “Heart of Gold” motion picture soundtrack and The Dixie Chicks' six time Grammy Award-winning “Taking the Long Way”. Powell remained the Chief Engineer at Blackbird for seven years.

Projects outside of Blackbird soon beckoned, and Powell began working extensively with Jack White's groups including The Raconteurs, The White Stripes, and The Dead Weather, as well as many of White's production jobs such as Wanda Jackson's "The Party Ain't Over", as well as Jack White and Alicia Keys' production of "Another Way to Die" from the James Bond film Quantum of Solace.

Powell is the co-owner of Sputnik Sound, a recording and mixing facility he set up in 2006 together with producer/engineer Mitch Dane. Powell met White for the first time in 2006, when he worked on Danger Mouse and Daniel Luppi's Rome album, on which White guested. Recent Sputnik Sound projects include Phish, Tinariwin, Seasick Steve, Leagues, Bobby Bare, Jr., Red Fang, De Staat, Diarrhea Planet, A Thousand Horses, Willie Nelson, Neil Young, Wolfmother, Arctic Monkeys and Chris Stapleton.

== Awards ==
Powell has won four Grammy Awards for his work on the albums listed below.

- Jars of Clay - The Eleventh Hour (Best Pop/Contemporary Gospel Album 2002), engineer.
- The Raconteurs - Consolers of the Lonely (Best Engineered Album, non-classical 2009), engineer & mixer - shared with Joe Chiccarelli and Jack White.
- Buddy Guy - Living Proof (Best Contemporary Blues Album 2011), engineer.
- Chris Stapleton - "Traveller" (Best Country Album 2015), engineer & mixer.

In 2015, Chris Stapleton's album "Traveller" won three Country Music Association Awards (CMAs) including "Album of The Year" and "New Artist of The Year". The album also received Grammy nominations for Album Of The Year, Best Country Song, Best Country Album (win), Best Country Solo Performance (win). The album was engineered and mixed by Powell.

== Selected discography ==
The production, engineering and mixing discography for Vance Powell is as follows.

| Year | Artist | Album | Label | Producer | Engineer | Mixer |
|---|---|---|---|---|---|---|
| 2022 | The Bobby Lees | Bellevue | Ipecac | check | | check |
| 2022 | Chris Shiflett | Long, Long Year | East Beach Records & Tapes | check | | |
| 2020 | Phish | Sigma Oasis | JEMP Records | check | | |
| 2018 | Clutch | Book of Bad Decisions | Weathermaker Music | check | check | |
| 2015 | Tyler Bryant & The Shakedown | The Wayside | Vervatos/Republic | check | check | check |
| 2015 | The Revivalists | Men Amongst Mountains | Wind-Up | | | check |
| 2015 | Chris Stapleton | Traveller | Mercury | | check | check |
| 2015 | JEFF the Brotherhood | Wasted on the Dream | Infinity Cat | | | check |
| 2015 | Elle King | "America's Sweetheart" from Love Stuff | RCA | | | check |
| 2015 | Seasick Steve | Sonic Soul Surfer | BMG | | check | check |
| 2015 | The Whistles & The Bells | The Whistles & The Bells | +180 | | check | check |
| 2014 | Tinariwen | Emmaar | ANTI- | | | check |
| 2014 | Daniel Ellsworth & The Great Lakes | Kid Tiger | Deer Head | | check | check |
| 2014 | Black Prairie | Fortune | Sugar Hill | check | check | check |
| 2014 | The Dirty Guv'nahs | Hearts on Fire | Summertown | | | check |
| 2014 | Peter Bradley Adams | The Mighty Storm | I Me Mine | | | check |
| 2014 | Bobby Bare, Jr. | Undefeated | Bloodshot | | check | check |
| 2014 | Dirk Powell | Walking Through Clay | Bloodshot | | check | check |
| 2013 | The Almost | Fear Inside Our Bones | Tooth & Nail | | | check |
| 2013 | Insane Clown Posse | Forgotten Freshness, Vol. 5 | Psycopathic | | check | check |
| 2013 | Sturgill Simpson | High Top Mountain | High Top Mountain | | check | check |
| 2013 | De Staat | I Con | Cool Green Records | | | check |
| 2013 | Seasick Steve | Hubcap Music | Third Man | | check | check |
| 2013 | Moon Taxi | Mountains Beaches Cities | BMG | | | check |
| 2013 | LeAnn Rimes | Spitfire | Curb | | | check |
| 2013 | Kings of Leon | Live At The O2 (DVD) | RCA | | | check |
| 2013 | Various Artists | The Great Gatsby O.S.T. | Interscope | | check | check |
| 2013 | Caitlin Rose | The Stand-In | ATO | | | check |
| 2013 | Red Fang | Whales and Leeches | Relapse | | | check |
| 2013 | North Mississippi Allstars | World Boogie Is Coming | Songs of the South | | | check |
| 2013 | Tyler Bryant & The Shakedown | Wild Child | Carved | | check | |
| 2013 | Leagues | You Belong Here | Bufalatone | | check | check |
| 2012 | Jack White | Blunderbuss | Third Man | | check | check |
| 2012 | The Whigs | Enjoy the Company | New West | | check | |
| 2012 | Keb' Mo' | Keb Mo/Keep It Simple | Sony | | check | |
| 2012 | Andrew Osenga | Leonard, the Lonely Astronaut | 1010 Distribution | | | check |
| 2012 | Andrew Peterson | Light for the Lost Boy | Centricity | | | check |
| 2012 | Buddy Guy | Live at Legends | RCA | check | | |
| 2012 | The Kicks | Tonight Changes Everything | The Kicks | | check | check |
| 2012 | Pujol | United States of Being | Saddle Creek | | | check |
| 2011 | Red Fang | Murder the Mountains | Relapse | | | check |
| 2011 | Deadly Apples | Petty | | | | check |
| 2011 | Danger Mouse & Danielle Luppi | Rome | Rome | | check | |
| 2011 | Chris Thile | Sleep with One Eye Open | Nonesuch | | check | check |
| 2011 | Wanda Jackson | The Party Ain't Over | | | check | check |
| 2011 | Bobby Bare, Jr. | A Storm, A Tree, My Mother's Head | Thirty Tigers | | | check |
| 2011 | Johnny Gimble | Celebrating with Friends | CMH | | check | |
| 2010 | The Whigs | In the Dark | ATO/Red | | check | check |
| 2010 | Buddy Guy | Living Proof | Jive | | check | |
| 2010 | The Dead Weather | Sea of Cowards | Warner Bros. | | check | check |
| 2010 | John Cowan | The Massenburg Sessions | Koch | | check | |
| 2010 | Karen Elson | The Ghost Who Walks | XL | | check | check |
| 2010 | Andrew Belle | The Ladder | 101 Distribution | | | check |
| 2010 | The White Stripes | Under Great White Northern Lights | Warner Bros. | | | check |
| 2010 | Hillsong | Yahweh | EMI | | | check |
| 2009 | The Dead Weather | Horehound | Independent | | check | check |
| 2009 | Seasick Steve | Man from Another Time | Rykodisc | | | check |
| 2009 | John Rich | Son of a Preacher Man | Warner Bros. | | check | |
| 2009 | Jars of Clay | The Long Fall Back to Earth | Provident | | check | |
| 2009 | Willie Nelson | Willie and the Wheel | Bismeaux | | check | |
| 2008 | Jessica Simpson | Do You Know | Epic | | check | |
| 2008 | Jewel | Perfectly Clear | Valory | | check | |
| 2008 | Jack White & Alicia Keys | "Another Way to Die" from Quantum of Solace O.S.T. | Capitol | | check | check |
| 2007 | Jars of Clay | Christmas Songs | Nettwerk | | check | check |
| 2007 | The White Stripes | Conquest | Warner Bros. | | check | |
| 2007 | Caedmon's Call | Overdressed | Ino/Columbia | | check | |
| 2006 | Poor Rich Folk | Love Is A Bullet | Independent | | check | check |
| 2006 | Matt Dusk | Back in Town | Decca | | check | |
| 2005 | Big & Rich | Comin' to Your City | Warner/Reprise | | check | |
