= Shelly Colvin =

American singer-songwriter and musician

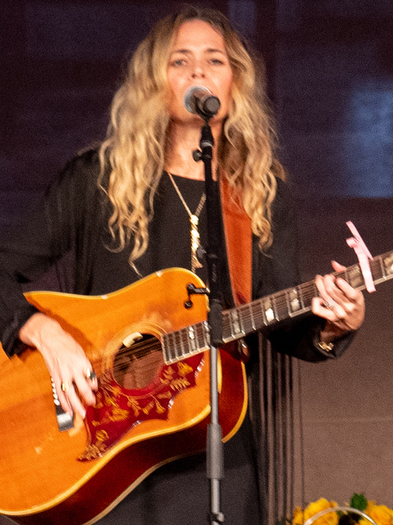
- Colvin in 2019

Background information
- Born: Huntsville, Alabama, U.S.
- Genres: Alternative country, folk
- Occupation(s): Musician, songwriter
- Instrument(s): Guitar, vocals
- Years active: 1999–present
- Website: shellycolvin.net

Shelly Warren Colvin is an American singer-songwriter and musician. Her song "Holding Steady" was featured in the 2008 Feature Film, The Lucky Ones with Tim Robbins and Rachel McAdams. Her debut album, "Up the Hickory Down the Pine" will be released in May 2012.

== Personal life ==
Shelly Colvin was born in Huntsville, Alabama, where her family still lives. She was raised singing gospel music, country and bluegrass, with her Father, a Baptist minister of music. She learned to sing and harmonize with her mother and grandmother on songs like "Abilene" or "Old Rugged Cross.". When she was very young, Colvin performed with her mother and father as a trio, touring churches all over northern Alabama. She has been a professional singer / songwriter since 2000 and has worked as an Artist Relations / Music Liaison for Billy Reid since 2009. She currently lives in East Nashville with her husband Jeff, a music attorney, and her dog, Emmylou.

== Music and songwriting ==
After Graduating college from the University of Alabama Colvin moved to California in 2000 and began playing music in a country duet called Sister South. Working with producers Mike Post and the legendary Jimmy Bowen, Sister South had a song featured in the Soundtrack for the film Larry the Cable Guy: Health Inspector. In 2006 Colvin moved to Nashville with her husband to pursue a solo career. Colvin began recording songs with the ACM award-winning producer Frank Liddell (Miranda Lambert, Chris Knight, Lee Ann Womack). Her song "Holding Steady" written with Mando Saenz was featured in the Film, The Lucky Ones with Tim Robbins and Rachel McAdams.

She is an active performer in Nashville and over the years has collaborated with artists such as Members of Old Crow Medicine Show, Dierks Bentley, Cory Chisel, Matraca Berg, Thad Cockrell and Roman Candle. She has also shared the stage with artists such as Jackson Browne, Chris Hillman, and Herb Pedersen (Emmylou Harris). Her sound has been described as "drawing from them, the California Country Folk sound they each in their own way helped create."

Colvin has co-written songs with several artists in Nashville and Los Angeles including Jeff Trott (Sheryl Crow) JD Souther, Matraca Berg, Mark D. Sanders, Chris Tompkins, Roman Candle, Mando Saenz and Drivin N Cryin's Kevn Kinney. The song "Pre-Approved, Pre-Denied" was the title track on Kinney's 2009 solo album.

In 2010 Colvin formed the band "Brown's Ferry" in Nashville with Beau Stapleton, Mando Saenz. Brown's Ferry played several shows on the east coast including dates with Gill Landry and Kevn Kinney.

According to her website, Colvin full-length debut "Up the Hickory Down the Pine" will be out March 13, 2012

== Fashion ==
Colvin has been featured in The Fader magazine's "On the Street" column, and in the film series "Jake Davis Test Shots" in W magazine.

She has performed at several Billy Reid functions including performances at Shindig, Fashion Night Out (along with her band Brown's Ferry) and Reid's 2011 Fashion Week Show along with Keegan DeWitt and Cory Chisel in February 2012, she worked as a stylist for Mumford and Sons and The Civil Wars at the Grammys and the Punch Brothers for their performance on The Tonight Show with Jay Leno.

== Film and television ==
When first moving to California after graduating college, Colvin landed a role on VH1's Rock the House in 2003. She portrayed a yoga teacher in Michael Bay's The Island and played a small role in Spider-Man 3. In 2011 Colvin played a guitar player in Mary Steenburgen's band for the FX television series Outlaw Country.
