= Rocksmith 2014 =

2013 video game

- Developer: Ubisoft San Francisco (Note: Additional work by Red Storm Entertainment and Longtail Studios.)
- Publisher: Ubisoft
- Director: Paul Cross
- Producer: Nao Higo
- Series: Rocksmith
- Engine: Gamebryo
- Platforms: Microsoft Windows; OS X PlayStation 3 PlayStation 4 Xbox 360; Xbox One
- Release: Microsoft Windows, OS X, PlayStation 3, Xbox 360: NA: October 22, 2013; AU: October 24, 2013; EU: October 25, 2013; IND: October 25, 2013; PlayStation 4, Xbox One: NA: November 4, 2014; EU: November 7, 2014
- Genre: Music video game
- Modes: Single-player, multiplayer

Rocksmith 2014 is a music video game produced by Ubisoft. It is a followup to the 2011 game Rocksmith, but has been described as a replacement to the original game rather than a sequel. Like its predecessor, the game allows players to plug in virtually any electric guitar or bass guitar and play along via the use of a USB adapter – removing the need for any proprietary controller like other music games such as Guitar Hero. The game comes with 66 songs on disk, with over a thousand more available to download as paid DLC. It was announced at Ubisoft's 2013 E3 presentation and was released for PlayStation 3, Xbox 360 and PC/Mac in October 2013, with versions for PlayStation 4 and Xbox One releasing in November 2014.

Rocksmith 2014 was released to generally positive reviews from critics who praised the game's improvements over its predecessor. The game continued to receive new DLC song packs weekly until March 2020. The game was succeeded by Rocksmith+, a music education-based subscription service based on the previous Rocksmith games, which was released on September 6, 2022.

Rocksmith 2014 was removed from all digital storefronts on October 20, 2023, due to the game's music licenses expiring, with downloadable tracks being delisted separately as their respective licenses expired. However, it was relisted on Steam on December 19, 2024, renamed to Rocksmith 2014 Edition REMASTERED LEARN & PLAY.

== Gameplay ==
Rocksmith 2014 recommends the use of the "Hercules" adapter, a USB cable that connects to the standard 1/4 in (6.35 mm) output jack of most electric and bass guitars. Other guitars, such as acoustic guitars, may require additional hardware, such as a pickup.

Rocksmith 2014 offers three different development paths for lead, rhythm, and bass guitar respectively. It now includes the ability to set song difficulty, rather than having to play the song starting at the lowest difficulty, as in Rocksmith. The game includes a Session Mode, which enables players to perform in jam sessions with the in-game musicians. Other new modes include an enhanced Master Mode to help with memory-playing and new Guitarcade minigames. New missions have been added as a way to challenge and direct players towards areas they need to improve upon.

Rocksmith 2014 is intended to be more of a teaching tool than the original game, featuring more than 85 lessons covering bends, accents, slides, and more. A new finger positioning tool has also been added. Rocksmith 2014 also features a mode for colorblind players.

== Development ==
On why the publisher chose the name Rocksmith 2014 as opposed to Rocksmith 2, senior vice president of sales and marketing Tony Key explained it was to encourage those who had not played the first game yet to buy and play the second one, without needing to invest in a previous installment of the franchise. He compared it to foreign language learning courses: "This is not the second step in guitar playing. Some people might interpret it that way. If you see Spanish 1 and then Spanish 2, you think that you need to learn Spanish 1 first." He described Rocksmith 2014 as a "replacement" for the original game rather than a sequel, and argued that its new songs, modes and improvements justified the purchase for people who had already bought the original Rocksmith.

=== Rocksmith 2014 Edition — Remastered ===
On August 26, 2016, Ubisoft announced Rocksmith 2014 Edition — Remastered, an updated version of the game to be released on October 4, 2016. The new version includes "a customizable learning curve, expanded practice tools, stat tracking, improved menus and more". The Remastered version is a free update to existing versions of the game, but was also released at retail for PC, PlayStation 4, and Xbox One with six additional songs. These six bonus songs have been released as DLC for all other users.

On December 13, 2016, Ubisoft released an additional patch for Rocksmith 2014 Edition — Remastered, which added two new capabilities that removed the requirement for the Real-Tone Cable. The first capability added to the software was Microphone Mode, which allowed players to use USB microphones and input devices that could simulate microphones for both players of acoustic guitars, and electric guitar players using non-Real-Tone cables. While this mode allows for note detection with the software, it disables the Rocksmith 2014's Authentic Tone capabilities, and players are limited to the "clean" guitar sound captured by the software. The second capability added to the software allows players to play along with the note tracks without note detection enabled.

In April 2020, it was announced that Rocksmith 2014 would receive no further DLC after the Opeth song pack, as focus was shifting to a new project.

== Track list ==
The game initially contains 66 playable tracks with over a thousand more available as DLC. "Cherub Rock" by the Smashing Pumpkins was a free DLC giveaway with pre-orders of the game. Rocksmith 2014 is capable of importing most songs from the original Rocksmith, with a few exceptions due to licensing issues.

Song	Artist(s)	Release year	Lead Tuning
"Self-Destruct" (Unlockable Song)	Aching Head	2013	E Standard
"Walk This Way"	Aerosmith	1975	E Standard
"No More Mr. Nice Guy"	Alice Cooper	1973	E standard: A447
"Stone"	Alice in Chains	2013	Eb drop Db
"R U Mine?"	Arctic Monkeys	2012	E standard
"Bat Country"	Avenged Sevenfold	2005	Drop D
"Ultra Soul"	B'z	2001	E standard: A444
"Snarling of Beasts" (Unlockable Song)	Bedowyn	2013	D standard
"Knockin' on Heaven's Door"	Bob Dylan	1973	E standard
"Peace of Mind"	Boston	1977	E standard
"Machinehead"	Bush	1994	E standard: A447
"Don't Stop" (Unlockable Song)	Crimson	2011	E standard
"Stuck on a Wire Out on a Fence (Orange)"	The Dear Hunter	2011	E standard
"Pour Some Sugar on Me"	Def Leppard	1987	E standard
"My Own Summer (Shove It)"	Deftones	1997	Eb drop Db
"Sea to Swallow" (Unlockable Song)	Disonaur	2013	E standard
"Wasteland"	EarlyRise	2011	Drop D
"Chompers"	Fang Island	2012	Drop D
"Everlong"	Foo Fighters	1997	Drop D
"Brand New Kind of Blue"	Gold Motel	2012	E standard
"X-Kid"	Green Day	2013	E standard
"Eight-Ball, Coroner's Pocket" (Unlockable Song)	Hail the Sun	2013	E standard
"The Trooper"	Iron Maiden	1983	E standard
"Sixteen Saltines"	Jack White	2012	E standard
"Stay In"	JAWS	2012	E standard
"Satch Boogie"	Joe Satriani	1987	E standard
"Desolate Motion" (Unlockable Song)	Karawan	NA	E standard
"You Really Got Me"	The Kinks	1964	E standard: A461
"Rock and Roll All Nite"	Kiss	1975	Eb standard
"Love That's Gone"	La Sera	2012	E standard
"Black Magic"	Magic Wands	2012	E standard
"Blood and Thunder"	Mastodon	2004	D standard
"On Top of the World" (Unlockable Song)	Matt Montgomery, Brian McCune, Brendan West	2013	E standard
"Cold Company"	Minus the Bear	2012	E standard
"Sweet Mountain River"	Monster Truck	2013	D standard
"Knights of Cydonia"	Muse	2006	E standard
"Heart-Shaped Box"	Nirvana	1993	Eb drop Db
"Don't Look Back in Anger"	Oasis	1996	E standard: A451
"Cemetery Gates"	Pantera	1990	E standard: A434
"Now"	Paramore	2013	Drop D
"Sore Tummy"	PAWS	2012	E standard
"Self Trap" (Unlockable Song)	Playground Kings	2007	E standard
"Every Breath You Take"	The Police	1983	E standard
"We Are the Champions"	Queen	1977	E standard
"Losing My Religion"	R.E.M.	1991	E standard
"Paranoid Android"	Radiohead	1997	E standard
"Blitzkrieg Bop"	Ramones	1976	E standard
"Round and Round"	Ratt	1984	Eb standard
"Wires"	Red Fang	2011	Drop D
"Savior"	Rise Against	2009	Eb standard
"Paint It Black"	The Rolling Stones	1966	E standard
"The Spirit of Radio"	Rush	1980	E standard
"Monochromic" (Unlockable Song)	Sabaka	2013	Drop D
"Rotten Apple"	Screaming Females	2012	E standard
"For a Fool"	The Shins	2012	E standard
"War Ensemble"	Slayer	1990	Eb standard
"The Chimera"	The Smashing Pumpkins	2012	Drop D
"All I Wanna Do"	Splashh	2013	E standard
"Hypnotize"	System of a Down	2005	Eb drop Db
"Go Further"	Tak Matsumoto	1999	E standard
"Mary Jane's Last Dance"	Tom Petty and the Heartbreakers	1993	E standard
"Rocksmith 2012 Theme" (Unlockable Song)	Ubisoft	2012	E standard
"Impossible Dreams" (Unlockable Song)	Versus Them	2012	E standard
"Say It Ain't So"	Weezer	1994	Eb standard
"Thunder Kiss '65"	White Zombie	1992	E standard
"My Generation"	The Who	1965	E standard

== Downloadable content ==
All Rocksmith DLC songs are forward-compatible with Rocksmith 2014, but DLC songs released on or after October 22, 2013, are compatible only with Rocksmith 2014 and will not play on the original version of Rocksmith. As of January 3, 2017, there are 835 songs and 209 song packs available to download from the Rocksmith store. Ubisoft San Francisco announced in April 2020 that they would be stopping development of further DLC for Rocksmith 2014 as they transitioned to a new project, after delivering 383 weeks of DLC content.

In addition to the DLC for Rocksmith 2014, owners of the original Rocksmith are able to purchase a Disc Import Tool that will import 52 of the 57 songs available on the original Rocksmith. The tracks that do not carry over are:

Artist(s)	Song	Year
Chris Lee	Boss	2011
Cream	Sunshine of Your Love	1967
Eric Clapton	Run Back to Your Side	2010
Seth Chapla	Jules	2011
Seth Chapla	The Star Spangled Banner	2011

== Reception ==
Reception

Aggregate score
Aggregator	Score
Metacritic	PC: 89/100; PS3: 86/100; X360: 87/100; PS4: 82/100; XONE: 72/100

Rocksmith 2014 was released in the US on October 22, 2013, to positive reviews. Aggregating review website Metacritic rated the PC version 89/100, the PlayStation 3 version 86/100, and the Xbox 360 version 87/100.

Lee Cooper of Hardcore Gamer praised the game and its general improvement over 2011's Rocksmith, saying, "Every facet of gameplay has been given a nice thick coat of improvement in Rocksmith 2014, issues that the original title was known for have either been removed entirely, or overhauled beyond recognition." Tal Blevins of IGN also praised the game in 2016 for its updates, pointing out the new finger position guide as a "huge improvement as it teaches new users how to form chords in the most efficient way possible."
