= Stupid Love =

Stupid Love may refer to:

- Stupid Love (album), a 2009 album by Mindy Smith
- "Stupid Love" (Jason Derulo song), 2014
- "Stupid Love" (Lady Gaga song), 2020
- "Stupid Love", a song by Dan + Shay from Dan + Shay
- "Stupid Love", a song by Olamide from YBNL
- "Stupid Love", a 2012 song by Supernova
- "S2pid Luv", a 2002 song by Salbakuta
- "Gold (Stupid Love)", a song by Excision and Illenium
