= Pete Lyman =

American audio engineer

Pete Lyman is a mastering engineer, and owner of Infrasonic Mastering, an audio and vinyl mastering studio with three locations in United States. He has mastered Grammy-award winning and nominated albums for Chris Stapleton, Tanya Tucker, Jason Isbell, Brandi Carlile, Sturgill Simpson, John Prine, Weezer, Panic! At the Disco, and more.

Lyman's music career began at the age of 14, playing bass in a number of bands, and sharing the stage with a variety of bands including My Bloody Valentine, The Mars Volta, and Sebadoh.

In 2012, Lyman opened Infrasonic Los Angeles, a custom-built mastering facility in Echo Park in Los Angeles, California. He has since opened additional studio facilities in Nashville, Tennessee and Oakland, California. Infrasonic Nashville is now home to Lyman's custom mastering suite, and his 1956 Neumann AM-32B lathe.

== Discography ==
The selected mastering and remastering discography for Pete Lyman is as follows:

Year	Artist	Album	Label
2026	The Cramps	Gravest Gravy	Vengeance Records
2022	The Bobby Lees	Bellevue	Ipecac
2019	Rival Sons	Feral Roots	Atlantic Records
2019	Sturgill Simpson	Sound & Fury	Elektra
2019	Tyler Childers	Country Squire	Hickman Holler
2019	Tanya Tucker	While I'm Livin'	Ttuckaho Inc.
2018	Brandi Carlile	By the Way, I Forgive You	Elektra
2018	Dierks Bentley	The Mountain	Capitol Records Nashville
2018	Anderson East	Encore	Low Country Sound/Elektra
2018	Tom Waits	Orphans: Brawlers, Bawlers & Bastards	Anti
2018	Wheeler Walker, Jr.	WW III	Pepper Hill Records / Thirty Tigers
2017	Zac Brown Band	Welcome Home	Elektra Records
2017	Jason Isbell	The Nashville Sound	Southeastern Records
2017	Chris Stapleton	From A Room: Volume 2	Mercury Records
2017	Europe	Walk the Earth	Victor Entertainment
2017	Chase Rice	Lambs & Lions	Broken Bow Records
2016	Son Lux	Stranger Forms	Glassnote Entertainment
2016	Weezer	Weezer (White Album)	Atlantic Records
2016	Panic! at the Disco	Death of a Bachelor	Fueled by Ramen
2016	Tom Waits	Orphans: Brawlers, Bawlers & Bastards	Anti
2015	Halsey	Badlands	Astralwerks
2015	Chris Stapleton	Traveller	Mercury Records
2015	Fall Out Boy	American Beauty/American Psycho	Island Records
2014	Banks	Goddess	Harvest Records
2014	Sturgill Simpson	Metamodern Sounds in Country Music	High Top Mountain
2012	Ben Kweller	Go Fly a Kite	The Noise Company
