= New Self =

2026 album by the Bobby Lees

Studio album by the Bobby Lees
- Released: June 12, 2026
- Studio: Sunset Sound (Los Angeles)
- Length: 20:13
- Label: Epitaph
- Producers: Alex Pasco; Dave Sardy

The Bobby Lees chronology
Bellevue (2022)	New Self (2026)

New Self is the fourth studio album by the American rock band the Bobby Lees. It was released on June 12, 2026, through Epitaph Records. It is the band's first album for Epitaph and follows Bellevue (2022).

== Background and recording ==
Following the release of Bellevue, the Bobby Lees announced an indefinite hiatus in 2023 amid burnout and financial pressures associated with touring and the music industry. During the hiatus, actor Jason Momoa offered financial support for the recording of a new album. Following their return to songwriting, vocalist and guitarist Sam Quartin, drummer Macky Bowman, and bassist Kendall Wind traveled to Los Angeles, where the album was recorded with producers Dave Sardy and Alex Pasco.

== Release and promotion ==
The Bobby Lees announced their signing to Epitaph Records in October 2025 alongside the release of the single "Napoleon". According to Quartin, the song concerns personal change and "trying to live in the solution" rather than focusing on problems.

The album was announced on March 4, 2026, alongside the release of its title track. Quartin described "New Self" as a personal song influenced by late-1990s hip-hop and nu metal.

== Track listing ==
All lyrics are written by Sam Quartin and all music composed by the Bobby Lees, except "50 Ft" (written by PJ Harvey).

New Self track listing
No.	Title	Length
1.	"Give"	2:37
2.	"Napoleon"	2:21
3.	"The End"	2:02
4.	"50 Ft"	2:13
5.	"New Self"	2:37
6.	"All I Got"	4:37
7.	"Got Me Good"	1:44
8.	"Red Hot"	2:02
Total length:		20:13

== Personnel ==
Credits are adapted from Bandcamp.

=== The Bobby Lees ===
- Sam Quartin – vocals
- Macky Bowman – drums
- Kendall Wind – bass
- Nick Casa – guitar

=== Additional contributors ===
- Dave Sardy – production, mixing (1, 5)
- Alex Pasco – production, mixing (2–4, 6–8)
- Stephen Marcussen – mastering
