= Mindy Smith (album) =

Studio album by Mindy Smith
- Released: June 26, 2012
- Genres: Americana, folk, country
- Length: 38:34
- Label: Giant Leap/TVX
- Producers: Jason Lehning, Mindy Smith

Mindy Smith chronology
Stupid Love (2009)	Mindy Smith (2012)

Professional ratings
Review scores
Source	Rating
PopMatters	8/10 stars
Roughstock	5/5 stars
Paste	6.8/10 stars

Mindy Smith is the fifth album by country and folk artist Mindy Smith. This is Smith's first independently released album.

== Track listing ==
All tracks are written by Mindy Smith except where noted.

No.	Title	Length
1.	"Closer" (Mindy Smith and Phil Madeira)	3:36
2.	"Take Me Back"	3:37
3.	"Pretending the Stars" (Mindy Smith and Daniel Tashian)	3:20
4.	"Don't Mind Me"	4:12
5.	"Tin Can"	2:59
6.	"Everything Here Will Be Fine"	2:47
7.	"Sober" (Mindy Smith, Tami Hinesh, and Kate York)	3:16
8.	"Devils Inside" (Mindy Smith and Lori McKenna)	3:37
9.	"Cure for Love"	3:11
10.	"When You're Walking on My Grave"	3:08
11.	"If I"	4:58

== Personnel ==
- Mindy Smith – vocals, casio SK-1
- Jason Lehning – B3, piano, Roland Juno-60, electric guitar, organ, percussion, mellotron
- Bryan Sutton – acoustic guitars, mandolin, banjo, bouzouki, tenor guitar
- Joe Pisapia – electric guitars, acoustic guitar
- Dan Dugmore – pedal steel guitar, electric guitar
- Lex Price – acoustic guitar, bass
- Ian Fitchuk – drums, percussion
- Kate York – backing vocals
- Sarah Siskind – backing vocals
- Julie Lee – backing vocals
- Daniel Tashian – backing vocals

== Production ==
- Producer: Jason Lehning and Mindy Smith
- Mixing: Jason Lehning and Paul Bowman
- Mastering: Jim DeMain
- Photography and Design: Fairlight Hubbard / Eye
- Paintings, prints, and keepsakes: Mindy Smith

== Charts ==
Chart performance for Mindy Smith
Album Chart (2012)	Peak position
US Americana/Folk Albums (Billboard)	15
US Heatseekers Albums (Billboard)	17
