= Yousician =

Finnish interactive music service

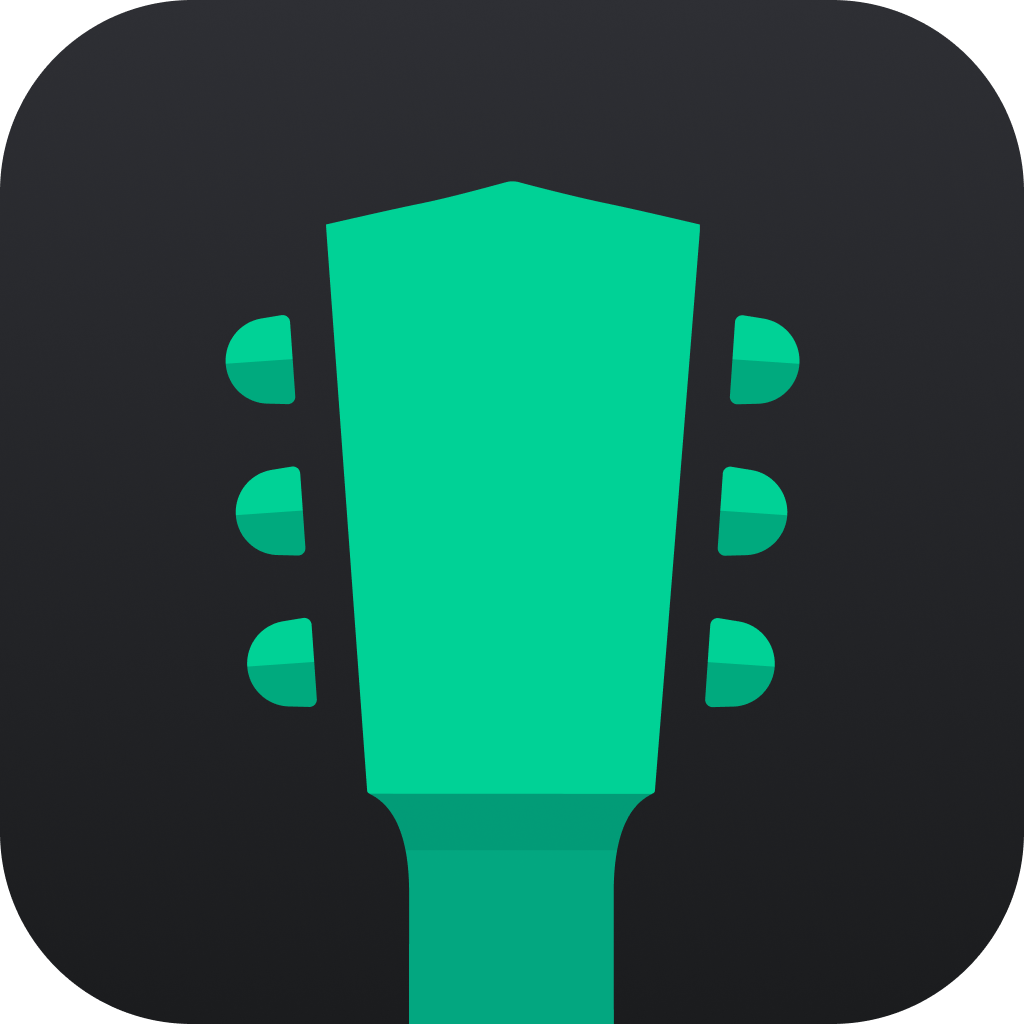
- Industry: Music education
- Founded: December 2010; 15 years ago
- Founder: Chris Thür & Mikko Kaipainen
- Headquarters: Helsinki, Finland
- Key people: Chris Thür; (CEO, co-founder)
- Products: Yousician for Guitar, Piano, Ukulele, Bass, Voice; Yousician for Educators; GuitarTuna
- Number of employees: 126
- Website: yousician.com

Yousician is a Finnish interactive and educational music service made to learn and play a musical instrument. It currently supports the following musical instruments: guitar, piano (keyboards), ukulele, bass, and voice.

== History ==
Yousician Ltd. is a Helsinki-based music education company founded by Chris Thür and Mikko Kaipainen in 2010 under the name Ovelin, as part of the Startup Sauna accelerator programme at Aalto University. The company develops and operates a music service called Yousician, and a tuner application called GuitarTuna.

In May 2020, Yousician launched its educational learning platform Guest Teacher Series, which provides music students with digital Q&A sessions with professional musicians.

In 2021, Yousician raised $28 million (€23.1 million) in funding. In total, by the end of 2021, Yousician's series B investment round had collected a total funding of €35 million. The company's largest investor is a Silicon Valley–based firm True Ventures. New investors at this funding round included Amazon's Alexa Fund and MPL Ventures LLP. Several angel investors have also invested in Yousician.

== Yousician ==
Yousician is currently available for five instruments: guitar, piano, bass, ukulele, and voice. For each instrument, Yousician features a lesson plan developed and produced in-house by the company's music educators. The lesson plans are designed like music courses and consist of lessons, exercises, tutorial videos and minigames.

Yousician's audio signal processing technology guides users as they learn to play real musical instruments. Users follow sheet music or tablature notation on their device's screen and play along to a backing track. Using the device's built-in microphone, Yousician gives feedback on accuracy and timing.

Yousician operates under a freemium model where one lesson per day is given for free, while unlimited lesson time is offered via paid subscriptions.

== Reception ==
Yousician was released in November 2014, to mostly positive reviews. Guitar World called it "modern technology's gift to music education" and in March 2015 it was featured as 'Editor's Choice' in the Apple iOS App Store. Critical voices usually do not question the product itself, but contrast it to the option of learning to play an instrument in private lessons. Voicesinc.org for example stated that "If you're happy to learn from a digital screen, then it's great, but if you want a lot more human interaction and demonstration, there may be some better options." However, Yousician's CEO Chris Thür has said that using their app does not exclude in-person teaching, but may be used to supplement it.

Yousician was one of Wired's top 100 European startups in 2012, and was also featured in The Sunday Times "World's Best Apps List 2012".

In June 2018, Yousician began what the company has called a "sunset of the song upload feature", which was completed with the October 2018 update 2.58 that removed all user-generated content from the app. The removal of user generated content sparked opposition among some vocal users online. Coincidence with introduction of what Yousician calls popular songs, licensed songs by well-known bands and artists, that was announced with the update 2.55 on 23 August 2018, led to speculation about the motives of the decision, however Yousician as a company has not elaborated on the reasons of their business move.

In 2020, the International Academy of Digital Arts and Sciences granted Yousician a gold at Lovie Awards in Apps, Mobile & Voice: Education & Reference category. The same year, Yousician was nominated as the Digital Service of the Year by Software & E-Business of Finland.

== Legal controversy with Ubisoft ==
The creators of Yousician had been sued by Ubisoft over claimed patent infringement on their patent U.S. Patent 9,839,852, for an "Interactive guitar game", which Ubisoft had used in their music video game Rocksmith. In August 2019, a federal district court ruled that the patent claims of Ubisoft were too broad and not defined in enough specificity, thus nullifying the patent and dismissing Ubisoft's suit.

== Competition ==
Yousician operates in a broader market of digital guitar learning platforms alongside several other services. Simply Guitar, developed by Simply (formerly JoyTunes), an Israeli company also known for Simply Piano and Piano Maestro, offers a similar smartphone-based approach with video lessons and real-time audio feedback aimed at beginners. Ultimate Guitar, founded in 1998 by Eugeny Naidenov and now part of Muse Group, is primarily a tablature and chord database with over one million user-submitted tabs, though it has expanded into interactive learning tools and courses. Chordie AI, developed by Turkish music technology company Deplike, takes a song-first and AI-driven approach, using 3D hand models, adaptive learning paths, and gamification to teach guitar to beginners. All four platforms use microphone-based audio recognition to provide real-time feedback, though they differ in their pedagogical emphasis: Yousician follows a structured syllabus across multiple instruments, Simply Guitar focuses on guided video instruction for guitar, Ultimate Guitar centers on its community-driven tab library, and Chordie AI emphasizes AI-personalized, gamified learning.
