= Long Island Shores =

Studio album by Mindy Smith
- Released: October 10, 2006
- Genre: Folk, country, Americana, pop
- Length: 42:08
- Label: Vanguard
- Producer: Mindy Smith, Lex Price, Steve Buckingham

Mindy Smith chronology
One Moment More (2004)	Long Island Shores (2006)	My Holiday (2007)

Professional ratings
Review scores
Source	Rating
Allmusic	link
Entertainment Weekly	(B+) link
Music Box	link

Long Island Shores is the second album by American singer-songwriter Mindy Smith, released in 2006. Produced by Mindy Smith, Lex Price and Steve Buckingham, the album was recorded at Omnisound Studios, The Doghouse, Studio 491 and Beat Hollow Studios.

== Reviews ==
Smith’s second album has been given mixed but mainly positive reviews, with its expressive and warm, breathy vocals and themes of love, loss, spirituality and sense of home. It includes uplifting melodies and gentle ballads.

== Track listing ==
All songs written by Mindy Smith except where noted.

1. "Out Loud" (Smith, Hillary Lindsey) – 3:28
2. "Little Devil" – 3:56
3. "Edge of Love" (Smith, Beth Nielsen Chapman) – 3:52
4. "Please Stay" – 3:00
5. "Tennessee" – 3:33
6. "I'm Not the Only One Asking" (Smith, Fred Wilhelm) – 3:07
7. "What If the World Stops Turning" feat. Buddy Miller (John Scott Sherrill) – 3:39
8. "You Just Forgot" (Dave Loggins, Dennis Robbins, Sherrill) – 3:25
9. "You Know I Love You Baby" (Smith, Maia Sharp) – 3:41
10. "Out of Control" – 4:01
11. "Long Island Shores" – 3:10
12. "Peace of Mind" – 3:16
13. "All His Saints" – 3:05 *downloadable bonus track from Best Buy stores

== Personnel ==
- Mindy Smith - Vocals, Harmony Vocals, Acoustic Guitar, Piano
- Eddie Bayers - Drums
- Michael Rhodes - Bass
- Buddy Miller - Electric Guitar, Vocals
- Bryan Sutton - Acoustic Guitar, 12 String
- Lex Price - Electric Guitar, Tenor Guitar, Mandolin
- Reese Wynans - B-3, Wurlitzer
- Dan Dugmore - Steel Guitar
- Daniel Tashian - Tambourine, Bass, 12 String, Percussion, Piano, Harmony Vocals
- Nick Buda - Drums
- Jonathan Trebing - Acoustic Guitar
- Tim Marks - Bass
- Andrea Zonn - Viola
- Roger Moutenot - Keyboards, Fognode, Steel Guitar, Drum Loop
- Micol Davis - Tambourine
- James Digiaralamo - Keyboards, Organ
- David Henry - Cello
- Kyle Andrews - MicroKorg

== Production ==
- Produced by: Mindy Smith, Lex Price and Steve Buckingham.
- Additional production: Roger Moutenot on "Please Stay", "You Just Forgot", "Out of Control" and "Long Island Shores".
- Production Assistant: Lesli Halingstad.
- Recorded at: Omnisound Studios Nashville, The Doghouse Nashville, Studio 491 and Beat Hollow Studios.
- Engineers: Neal Cappellino, Marshal Morgan, Casey Woods, Bill Warner, Roger Moutenot, Brian Siskind and Lex Price.
- Assistant Engineers: Bob Ingison, Jason Blackburn and Chris Furbush
- Digital Editing: Chip Matthews
- Mixed by: Gary Paczosa at Minutiae
- Assisted by: Brandon Bell and Joey Crawford
- Photography and Art Direction: Traci Goudie

== Charts ==
Chart performance for Long Island Shores
Album Chart (2006)	Peak position
US Billboard 200	167
US Independent Albums (Billboard)	15
US Heatseekers Albums (Billboard)	6
UK Country Albums (OCC)	3

== Notes ==
- "Out Loud" and "Please Stay" were released as singles.
- "Out Loud" was released with an official accompanying video.
