= Roman Candle (band) =

- Origin: Chapel Hill, North Carolina, United States
- Genres: Indie rock, indie pop, alternative rock
- Years active: 1997–present
- Labels: V2, Carnival Recording Company, Hollywood, Outlook Music.
- Website: romacandlemusic.com

Roman Candle is an indie rock band from Chapel Hill, North Carolina, composed of Skip Matheny, Logan Matheny and Timshel Matheny. They have released three studio albums, several touring EP's, toured extensively throughout the U.S. and Europe, and played in various other bands / live acts. Roman Candle was founded in 1997 in Chapel Hill, North Carolina. The band, who all attended UNC-Chapel Hill, recorded and performed there for 10 years before moving to Nashville, Tennessee, in 2008.

== History ==
Roman Candle started playing shows around Chapel Hill, North Carolina in 1997. Most early shows involved (current band members) Skip and Logan Matheny and various musicians from around town sitting in. Bass player and singer Barnett Greenberg (from the band Green Tangerine), who was a UNC student and fellow English major, practiced and gigged with the brothers as the bass player. Eventually a regular lineup formed, including Skip's wife Timshel on fender rhodes and farfisa. They sold over 400 copies of a self-released cd of demos in 2000 on consignment at Chapel Hill's SchoolKids Records, and signed to Trevor Pryce's Outlook Music Company in October 2001. When they signed their first record deal, Skip and Timshel were working in Portland Oregon as a forklift driver and a dishwasher at an art college (respectively).

Their record "Says Pop" was released by Outlook in May 2002. The band toured across the U.S. in support of Says Pop, gathered an enthusiastic fanbase, and were named in Rolling Stone magazine, as Chapel Hill's "darling" band on the rise. During this time they met producer Chris Stamey (The db's, Yo la tengo, Ryan Adams, R.E.M.), and signed to Hollywood Records' fledgling college music division (also signed, were The Polyphonic Spree and Patrick Park). Hollywood recruited Stamey to rework the songs on Says Pop, for a major label release, re-titled "The Wee Hours Revue" in 2003. However, Hollywood, uncertain about the "college division" of their label, decided to shelve Roman Candle's album for 2 years. It was ultimately purchased by V2 Records and released in 2006.

During this time, the band continued to tour, write and record music, and became a part of Chris Stamey's "mod squad," a famed group of studio / touring musicians around Stamey's studio, Modern Recording. Roman Candle band members toured in support of Stamey's records, "A Question of Temperature" (with Yo la Tengo) and "Travels in the South". The band became known for their live shows and, after opening up for The Soundtrack of Our Lives, lead singer Ebbot Lundberg called them from the stage "the best opening act he'd seen in years."

Also during this time, singer/songwriter Thad Cockrell, gave a copy of the record to famed BBC DJ Bob Harris (radio). He called the record, on the air, one of the best rock and roll records he'd heard in years. Harris has since invited RC to play on his BBC Radio 2 show multiple times.

In 2006, V2 Records bought "The Wee Hours Revue" masters from Hollywood and released the record to widespread acclaim in June 2006—including praise from The Boston Globe, Pitchfork Media, and making Paste's Top 100 album's of 2006 -- They were no. 38. Editor of Paste (magazine) Josh Jackson even cited the album as one of the top 10 most overlooked albums of 2006. Even as late after the release as April 2007, Harp Magazine, journalist Mark Kemp named The Wee Hours Revue One of the best roots-rock records of the decade. The band toured throughout 2006 in support of the record, including tours with The Whigs, The Avett Brothers, Bird Monster, Indigo Girls, Aimee Mann, The Psychedelic Furs and a date at Radio City Music Hall.

In 2007, they continued to tour the U.S. and the U.K., including a pair of live performances on BBC radio 2.

In November 2008, the band announced from their website that they had signed to a new label, Carnival Recording Company, and that they would be releasing 4 eps, accompanying the release of their next full-length. The first of these ep's, "Eden was a Garden" was released in digital and vinyl formats on Dec. 4, 2008. The second ep "They Say" was released on March 9, 2009.

Their album "Oh Tall Tree in the Ear," was released on May 12, 2009. The title is taken from Rainer Maria Rilke's Sonnets to Orpheus. The band embarked on a Paste Magazine / WOXY sponsored tour in support of the record with The Deep Vibration, and continued to tour throughout 2009 playing almost a hundred shows, including dates with Iron and Wine, Wild Beasts, Jason Isbell and others.

In August 2013, the band announced they would be releasing their next studio album, Debris, on October 28, 2013. The Nashville Scene described the album as "complex," with moments of "wry wit and unabashed romanticism."

== "Drinks With" Interviews ==
In October 2009, Skip and Timshel started an artist-on-artist interview series, called "Drinks with" for American Songwriter. The content of the series is mostly about songs and songwriting, and there have been interviews with performers such as the Arctic Monkeys, Tom T. Hall, The xx, Alejandro Escovedo, Julian Casablancas, and Phoenix (band).

In 2013, the series was extended the series to visual artists, writers and comedians, published in Paste Magazine, and has included David Sedaris, Colin Meloy and Carson Ellis, Kevin Nealon, Makoto Fujimura and Bruce Herman.

== Side projects ==
- Roman Candle members are known touring (as backing musicians) with various artists: most notably:
- The Rosebuds
- Chris Stamey
- Thad Cockrell
- Shelly Colvin
- Caitlin Cary
- Keegan DeWitt
- Courtney Jaye
- Bryan Cates
- Nate Snell

Members of Roman Candle have produced / performed on the following records

- Chris Stamey: Travels in the South (Yep Roc Records 2003) - performed on album
- Caitlin Cary and Thad Cockrell: Begonias (Yep Roc Records 2005) - performed on album, wrote "Waiting in June" which appears on album.
- Patrick Park: Everyone's in Everyone (Curb Appeal Records 2007) - performed on album
- Keegan DeWitt: & the Sparrows (Dual Coast records 2007) - Produced and performed on album.
- Members of the band have also performed on unreleased recordings by Ryan Adams, Chris Stamey and Peter Holsapple, Thad Cockrell.
- Members of the band have produced and engineered recordings by Thad Cockrell.
- The band has also twice toured nationally with the Indigo Girls.

== Discography ==
- Debris (Big Light Recordings, 2013)
- Oh Tall Tree in the Ear (Carnival Recording, 2009)
- Why Modern Radio is A-OK [EP] (Carnival Recording / Mag-pie records, 2009)
- They Say [EP] (Carnival Recording / Mag-pie records, 2009)
- Eden was a Garden [EP] (Carnival Recording / Mag-pie records, 2008)
- The Wee Hours Revue (V2 Records, 2006)
- Says Pop (Outlook Music, 2002)
