= Mindy Smith =

American singer-songwriter (born 1972)

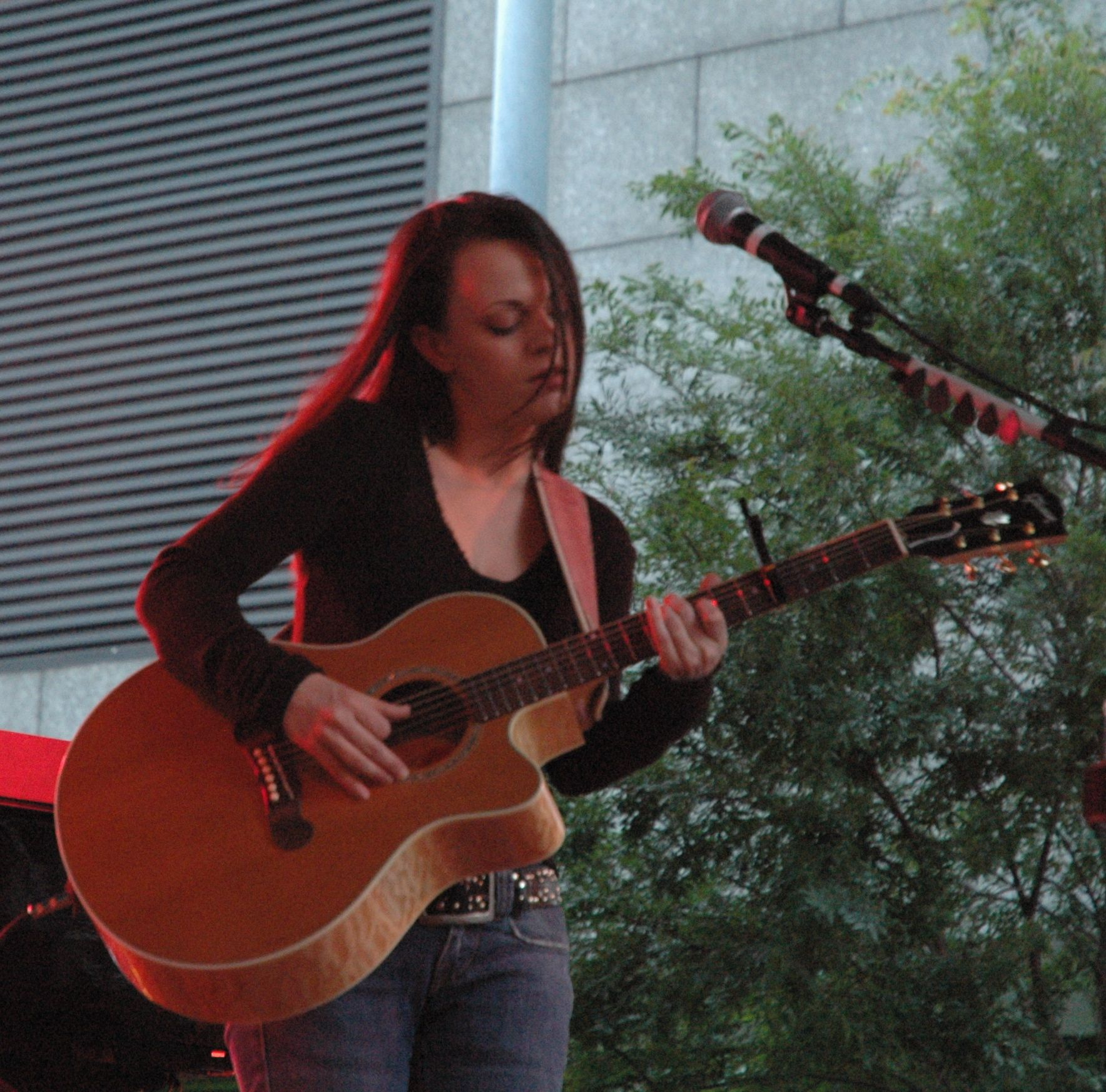
- Smith performing in 2005

Background information
- Born: June 1, 1972 (age 53); Long Island, New York, U.S.
- Genres: Folk, pop, country
- Occupations: Singer, songwriter
- Instruments: Guitar, vocals
- Years active: 2003–present
- Label: Vanguard
- Website: www.mindysmithmusic.com

Melinda Leigh Smith (born June 1, 1972) is an American singer-songwriter. Her first record deal came after she sang a cover version of the song "Jolene" by Dolly Parton.

== Music career ==
Smith was adopted at birth by a non-denominational Protestant minister and his wife, who was choir director at the church. She grew up on Long Island, New York. After her mother died of cancer in 1991, Smith attended Cincinnati Bible College for two years.

Smith and her father moved to Knoxville, Tennessee, where she began listening to folk and bluegrass music, Alison Krauss, and the Cox Family. In 1998, she moved to Nashville to pursue a career in music. Two years later, she reached the finals of a contest at the Kerrville Folk Festival. This led to a contract with Big Yellow Dog Music.

Smith attracted attention in 2003 when she sang a cover version of "Jolene" by Dolly Parton for the tribute album Just Because I'm a Woman. Soon after, she signed a contract with Vanguard Records, who released her debut album, One Moment More in 2004. In addition to Dolly Parton, she has expressed admiration for John Prine, Alison Krauss, Patty Griffin, Shania Twain, Kris Kristofferson, Buddy Miller, and Bill Gaither.

"Come to Jesus" was her biggest hit, receiving airplay on country, Christian, adult album alternative (AAA), and adult contemporary radio. The song charted at No. 32 on the Adult Top 40 chart of Billboard magazine. In 2004 Smith appeared at the Cambridge Folk Festival in the U.K., which was broadcast nationally on BBC Radio.

In October 2006, Smith released "Out Loud", the first single from her second album Long Island Shores. The song was well received by AAA rock radio and Country Music Television (CMT). On January 10, 2007, she performed "Please Stay" on The Tonight Show with Jay Leno.

In October 2007, Smith released a Christmas album, My Holiday. She wrote six original songs, including "I Know the Reason" with Thad Cockrell.

In August 2009, Smith released her fourth studio album, Stupid Love. She appeared on The Early Show on August 15, 2009, to perform the first single, "Highs and Lows". On September 29, 2009, while promoting the album on the syndicated radio show World Cafe, she disclosed that she had obsessive–compulsive disorder.

In June 2012, Smith released an eponymous independent studio album on her own Giant Leap label, in conjunction with TVX. In October of the same year, Vanguard Records released a compilation album of her songs, "The Essential Mindy Smith".

On October 29, 2013, Smith released a holiday EP entitled Snowed In on Giant Leap/TVX. The release contained both original Christmas songs and cover material.

Between 2015 and 2018, Smith contributed (as sole writer or co-writer) several songs to the musical television drama series Nashville. She is credited on four of the songs performed by cast members and appearing on the soundtrack in the series' final three seasons.

== Charity ==
In March 2013, Smith worked with Anthropologie during an in-store performance to raise money and awareness for the Captain Planet Foundation, a non-profit organization. Anthropologie donated fifteen percent of sales made in the first hour after Smith's performance to CPF.

== Awards and honors ==
- Best New/Emerging Artist of the Year, Americana Music Association, 2004

== Discography ==
=== Studio albums ===
Title	Album details	Peak chart positions				
Title	Album details	US	US Heat	US Indie	US Rock	US Folk
One Moment More	Release date: January 27, 2004; Label: Vanguard; Formats: CD, Vinyl, music download	143	2	6	—	—
Long Island Shores	Release date: October 10, 2006; Label: Vanguard; Formats: CD, music download	167	6	15	—	—
My Holiday	Release date: October 9, 2007; Label: Vanguard; Formats: CD, music download	—	8	—	—	—
Stupid Love	Release date: August 11, 2009; Label: Vanguard; Formats: CD, Vinyl, music download	122	1	—	45	—
Mindy Smith	Release date: June 26, 2012; Label: Giant Leap/TVX; Formats: CD, music download	—	17	—	—	15
Quiet Town	Release date: October 4, 2024; Label: Compass; Formats: CD, Vinyl, music download	—	—	—	—	—
"—" denotes releases that did not chart

=== Compilations ===
Title	Album details
The Essential Mindy Smith	Released: October 9, 2012; Label: Vanguard; Formats: CD, Vinyl, music download

=== Extended plays ===
Title	Album details
Snowed In	Released: October 29, 2013; Label: Giant Leap/TVX; Formats: CD, music download

=== Singles ===
Year	Single	Peak positions		Album
Year	Single	US Adult	US Country Airplay	Album
2003	"Jolene" (with Dolly Parton)	—	—	One Moment More
2004	"Come to Jesus"	32	—	One Moment More
2004	"One Moment More"	—	—	One Moment More
2006	"Out Loud"	—	—	Long Island Shores
2007	"Please Stay"	—	—	Long Island Shores
2009	"Highs and Lows"	—	—	Stupid Love
2012	"Closer"	—	—	Mindy Smith
2018	"Better Boat" (with Kenny Chesney)	—	25	Songs for the Saints
"—" denotes releases that did not chart

=== Music videos ===
Year	Video	Director
2003	"Jolene"	Trey Fanjoy
2004	"Come to Jesus"	Sophie Muller
2005	"One Moment More"	Sophie Muller
2006	"Out Loud"	Traci Goudie
2011	"Taking You with Me" (with Daniel Tashian)	Traci Goudie
2012	"Closer"	Fairlight Hubbard/Ryan Hamblin
2013	"Anymore of This" (with Matthew Perryman Jones)	Fairlight Hubbard
2015	"On Top of the World"	
2021	"Cure for Love"	

== Special appearances ==
- Just Because I'm a Woman: The Songs of Dolly Parton (2003) - Track: "Jolene"
- Sweetheart 2005: Love Songs (2005) - Track: "A Nightingale Sang in Berkeley Square"
- This Bird Has Flown – A 40th Anniversary Tribute to the Beatles' Rubber Soul (2005) - Track: "The Word"
- Stronger Than Before by Olivia Newton-John (2005) - Track: "Phenomenal Woman"
- Those Were The Days by Dolly Parton (2005) - Track: "The Cruel War"

Awards
First None recognized before	AMA New/Emerging Artist Of The Year; 2004	Succeeded by Mary Gauthier
