= My Holiday =

Studio album by Mindy Smith
- Released: October 9, 2007
- Genres: Folk, country, Christmas
- Length: 41:41
- Label: Vanguard
- Producers: Mindy Smith, Steve Buckingham

Mindy Smith chronology
| Long Island Shores (2006) | My Holiday (2007) | Stupid Love (2009) |

Professional ratings
Review scores
| Source | Rating |
|---|---|
| AllMusic | link |
| PopMatters | 7/10 link |

My Holiday is the third album by American singer-songwriter Mindy Smith, released in 2007. This is Smith's first holiday (Christmas) record.

== Track listing ==
1. "My Holiday" - 3:43 (Smith)
2. "The Christmas Song" - 3:48 (Mel Tormé, Bob Wells)
3. "Santa Will Find You" - 3:49 (Smith, Chely Wright)
4. "Follow the Shepherd Home" - 4:22 (Smith, Wright)
5. "What Are You Doing New Year's Eve?" - 3:51 (Frank Loesser)
6. "Away in a Manger" - 2:42 (arr. by Smith)
7. "I Know the Reason" - 4:19 (Smith, Thad Cockrell)
8. "Silver Bells" - 3:14 (Jay Livingston, Ray Evans)
9. "I'll Be Home for Christmas" - 3:34 (Buck Ram, Kim Gannon, and Walter Kent)
10. "It Really Is (A Wonderful Life)" - 3:38 (Wright)
11. "Come Around" - 4:16 (Smith)
12. "Chestnuts Roasting" - 0:19

== Personnel ==
- Mindy Smith – vocals
- Chely Wright – harmony vocals on "Follow the Shepherd Home"
- Alison Krauss – harmony vocals on "Away in a Manger"
- Thad Cockrell – duet vocals on "I Know the Reason"
- Kenny Vaughan – electric guitar
- Bryan Sutton – acoustic guitar
- Michael Rhodes – bass
- Steve Cox – piano
- Eddie Bayers – drums
- Andrea Zonn – violin, viola
- Lex Price – mandola
- Steve Buckingham – tambourine
- Paul Franklin – steel
- Sam Levine – clarinet
- Eric Darken– vibes

== Production ==
- Producer: Mindy Smith and Steve Buckingham
- Engineer: Neal Cappellino, Brandon Bell and Gary Paczosa
- Mixing: Gary Paczosa
- Design and Photography: Traci Goudie

== Charts ==
Chart performance for My Holiday
| Album Chart (2007) | Peak position |
|---|---|
| US Heatseekers Albums (Billboard) | 8 |
| UK Country Albums (Official Charts) | 10 |

== Notes ==
Mindy also released a Christmas EP entitled "Snowed In" on October 29, 2013 on the Giant Leap/TVX label. This release contained original material and covers of Christmas classics.
