= Red Fang (album) =

2009 album

Studio album by Red Fang
- Released: March 10, 2009
- Genre: Stoner rock; classic metal
- Length: 36:13
- Label: Sargent House

Red Fang chronology
Red Fang (2009)	Murder the Mountains (2011)

Professional ratings
Review scores
Source	Rating
AllMusic	3.5/5 stars

Red Fang is the first album by American stoner metal band Red Fang, released in 2009 on the Sargent House record label.

== Track listing ==
All tracks written by Red Fang.

No.	Title	Length
1.	"Prehistoric Dog"	4:28
2.	"Reverse Thunder"	3:15
3.	"Night Destroyer"	3:12
4.	"Humans Remain Human Remains"	6:28
5.	"Good to Die"	3:29
6.	"Bird on Fire"	3:08
7.	"Wings of Fang"	2:49
8.	"Sharks"	2:26
9.	"Whales and Leeches"	4:21
10.	"Witness"	2:37

== Personnel ==
Red Fang:

- Aaron Beam – bass, lead vocals
- Maurice Bryan Giles – guitars, lead vocals
- David Sullivan – guitars, backing vocals
- John Sherman – drums

Additional personnel:

- Adam Pike – engineering (tracks 1–4), organ on "Humans Remain Human Remains"
- Nathan Abner – engineering (track 5)
- Mike Anzalone – engineering (tracks 6–10)
- Stephen Hawkes – mastering
