= Rocksmith =

2011 video game

- Developer: Ubisoft San Francisco
- Publisher: Ubisoft
- Director: Paul Cross
- Producer: Nao Higo
- Series: Rocksmith
- Engine: Gamebryo
- Platforms: Microsoft Windows; PlayStation 3 Xbox 360
- Release: PlayStation 3, Xbox 360: NA: October 18, 2011; AU: September 13, 2012; EU: September 28, 2012; JP: October 11, 2012; Windows: NA: October 16, 2012; EU: October 18, 2012
- Genre: Music
- Mode: Single-player

Rocksmith is a music video game produced by Ubisoft, released in October 2011 for the Xbox 360 and PlayStation 3 platforms in North America. Rocksmith was released on PlayStation 3 and Xbox 360 during September 2012 in Australian and European markets and October 2012 in Japan. A Windows version was released on October 16, 2012, after several delays. The game's main feature is that, unlike other rhythm games such as Guitar Hero that require proprietary controllers to play, Rocksmith instead allows players to plug in virtually any electric guitar and play along via a USB adapter.

An expansion adding bass guitar compatibility became available on August 14, 2012. A second release which integrates the bass expansion as well as additional refinements became available on October 16, 2012. A second game in the series, titled Rocksmith 2014, was released in 2013, followed by a third, Rocksmith+, in 2022.

== Gameplay ==
Rocksmith requires the use of the Real Tone cable, a USB cable that connects to the standard 1/4 in (6.35 mm) output jack of most electric guitars. Other guitars, such as acoustic guitars, may require additional hardware, such as a pickup. Though players can provide their own guitar, Rocksmith was also sold as a bundle that includes the game and adapter, an Epiphone Les Paul Junior guitar, strap, and 2 picks.

Within the game, the player progresses along a career (separately for guitar and bass) where more songs, game modes, and challenges open up as the player earns Rocksmith points.

In Rocksmith, players are shown a virtual fretboard with colored notes (represented as colored rectangles associated to specific guitar strings) on numbered lanes (corresponding to frets) to indicate what they should play on the guitar. The top portion of the screen graphically shows how the player has performed on the previous sections of the song and at what difficulty (the orange boxes), as well as the song's lyrics and the current score.

In the normal game mode, playing with a song, the player is presented with a display that shows a representation of the guitar's fretboard, divided by numbered frets and colored strings. Notes represented as colored rectangles, matching the color of the guitar string(s) to be held down, move from the background to the foreground along numbered lanes reflecting the fret position. The notes turn 90 degrees at the moment that they should be strummed; additional markers are provided to help with timing of future notes. Additionally, the game shows an ideal position for the player's hand on the fretboard for the current segment of the song, moving this up and down as necessary. Lyrics to the song, if any, are shown in a karaoke-style under the background note pattern, but otherwise do not impact gameplay. Prior to playing any song, the game has the player check the tuning of the guitar.

A core feature of normal play is the game's ability to adjust the note density – effectively the difficulty – of the current song based on the player's performance to that point. Each song is split into a number of phases, and depending on how accurate the player is during a phase, a subsequent phase may provide more difficult note patterns. If the player's accuracy is not good during a phase, the subsequent one will fall back to a lower difficulty level. The player gets points for each note hit, and thus staying at higher difficulty levels can earn more points, but it is impossible for the player to fail a song. In some cases, if the player is missing too many notes, the game will pause the song to allow the player to readjust their hand position and make sure they strum the right note before proceeding. The game saves the last note density level that the player completed a song at, and will use that level at the start of the next play through that song.

As the player completes songs or other games modes within the career, they earn "Rocksmith points", similar to experience points, which unlock additional features. New venues, shown in the background of the main gameplay screens and having subtle influences on the sound of the guitar or bass, and new guitars and basses become available, as well as additional game modes. Some of these modes in the game are designed to help the player practice specific techniques. Technique Challenges, for both guitar and bass, give practice to some of the common tricks for the two instruments, such as hammer-ons/pull-offs, Chords, and Power Chords for guitar, and two-finger plucking and syncopation for bass. Each song can also be played in a Riff Repeater mode, where the player can select a specific section of song to practice and perfect, with options on controlling the speed and note density level. A "Guitarcade" becomes available after completing one of the Technique Challenges, which incorporates that technique into a mini-game element, such as "Ducks", a Galaga-like shoot-em-up, where the player must get their fretboard positions correct to fire on targets approaching in various lanes. Finally, the player can gain access to a free play mode, which uses amplifier modeling to simulate the sound of a guitar as played through stage equipment. The modeling supports a variety of virtual hardware components, such as effects pedals and amplifiers, which can also be unlocked through career mode. Each song includes a custom sound bank referred to as an "authentic tone" designed to make the player's guitar sound as close to the original guitar tone of the song as possible, though they can override these with the virtual pedals and amplifiers.

== Development ==
Rocksmith has its origins in a project called Guitar Rising. Guitar Rising was developed by Game Tank, a small startup business, and was showcased at the 2008 Game Developers Conference. The game, at that time, was more of a technology demonstration, to display the ability of proprietary hardware – a USB cable that plugged into the audio-out jack of nearly any electric guitar – to determine what notes and chords the player was performing, instead of the typical note-matching gameplay of games like Guitar Hero or Rock Band. The demonstration at GDC featured gameplay elements that would be taken into Rocksmith; the interface would show notes colored by string and numbered by fret, and that as the player progressed in the song, the difficulty or note-density would change to reflect how well the player was doing, as to avoid frustrating the player with too-difficult charts. Jake Parks of Game Tank had stated at the time that they were looking to release the game in late 2008, anticipating a soundtrack of about thirty songs depending on licensing. Later, the title was pushed to a 2009 release.

About the same time, Ubisoft's president of North American operations, Laurent Detoc, challenged its San Francisco development team to develop their own game, as until this time, the studio only had supported external developers. The music game field was of interest; as stated by Detoc, "I just could not believe the amount of waste that had gone in people spending so much time with plastic guitars". The studio was able to acquire Game Tank and the Guitar Rising technology, bringing aboard Parks and his lead designer Nick Bonardi as Ubisoft employees. The Ubisoft studio team of about 60 were led by Paul Cross and Nao Higo, and set about to transform the Guitar Rising into a retail product over a period of about two years. Developer Jason Schroeder referred to the state of Guitar Rising as a "PC tech demo of note recognition" and set about redesigning the HUD so that non-guitarists could understand the game better. It had been laid-out as a horizontal scrolling tablature, but this was found to be too difficult for non-guitarists to work with, and as the game was meant for anyone to be able to play, a vertical scrolling note chart was created instead.

== Soundtrack ==
Radiohead's "Bodysnatchers" and Lynyrd Skynyrd's "Free Bird" were included with pre-orders of the game.

List of songs
Song	Artist(s)	Release year
"House of the Rising Sun"	The Animals	1964
"I Want Some More"	Dan Auerbach	2009
"When I'm with You"	Best Coast	2010
"I Got Mine"	The Black Keys	2008
"Next Girl"	The Black Keys	2010
"Song 2"	Blur	1997
"Rebel Rebel"	David Bowie	1974
"Step Out of the Car"	The Boxer Rebellion	2011
"Run Back to Your Side"	Eric Clapton	2010
"Angela"	Jarvis Cocker	2009
"Sunshine of Your Love"	Cream	1967
"We Share the Same Skies"	The Cribs	2009
"Boys Don't Cry"	The Cure	1979
"I Can't Hear You"	The Dead Weather	2010
"Take Me Out"	Franz Ferdinand	2004
"Do You Remember"	The Horrors	2009
"I Miss You"	Incubus	1999
"Slow Hands"	Interpol	2004
"Use Somebody"	Kings of Leon	2008
"Are You Gonna Go My Way"	Lenny Kravitz	1993
"Surf Hell"	Little Barrie	2011
"Sweet Home Alabama"	Lynyrd Skynyrd	1974
"Unnatural Selection"	Muse	2009
"Plug In Baby"	Muse	2001
"In Bloom"	Nirvana	1991
"Breed"	Nirvana	1991
"Well OK Honey"	Jenny O.	2010
"Good Enough"	Tom Petty and the Heartbreakers	2010
"Where is My Mind?"	Pixies	1988
"Go With the Flow"	Queens of the Stone Age	2002
"High and Dry"	Radiohead	1995
"California Brain"	RapScallions	2011
"Number Thirteen"	Red Fang	2011
"Higher Ground"	Red Hot Chili Peppers	1989
"(I Can't Get No) Satisfaction"	The Rolling Stones	1965
"The Spider and the Fly"	The Rolling Stones	1965
"Play with Fire"	The Rolling Stones	1965
"Gobbledigook"	Sigur Rós	2008
"Panic Switch"	Silversun Pickups	2009
"Outshined"	Soundgarden	1991
"Me and the Bean"	Spoon	2001
"Between the Lines"	Stone Temple Pilots	2010
"Vasoline"	Stone Temple Pilots	1994
"Under Cover of Darkness"	The Strokes	2011
"Mean Bitch"	Taddy Porter	2010
"A More Perfect Union"	Titus Andronicus	2010
"Slither"	Velvet Revolver	2004
"Burnished"	White Denim	2011
"Icky Thump"	The White Stripes	2007
"Islands"	The xx	2009
"Chimney"	The Yellow Moon Band	2009

In addition, there are 6 tracks from the developers that are unlockable in the journey mode when double encores are reached in a set:

Song	Artist(s)	Release year
"Ricochet"	Brian Adam McCune	2011
"Boss"	Chris Lee	2011
"Space Ostrich"	Disonaur	2011
"Jules"	Seth Chapla	2011
"The Star-Spangled Banner"	Seth Chapla	2011
"Six AM Salvation"	Versus Them	2011

== Reception ==
Reception

Aggregate score
Aggregator	Score
Metacritic	PS3: 80/100; X360: 77/100; PC: 78/100

Rocksmith was released in the US on October 18, 2011, to mostly positive reviews. Aggregating review website Metacritic rated the PlayStation 3 version 80/100, the PC version 78/100, and the Xbox 360 version 77/100. Curtis Silver of Wired gave the game a 9/10, praising the intuitive nature of the note track and wrote that "Rocksmith is an amazing learning tool for the guitar. The eventual progression of rhythm games was to get to this point, where you are playing real instruments and actually learning how to play, rather than some sort of cartoonish emulation." Ania Kwak of GamingExcellence gave the game a 9.8, stating that "It's rare to find a game that encompasses a teaching tool as effective as Rocksmith, with virtually no negatives to observe, while still being enjoyable to play." Adam Dulge of PlayStation Universe praised the game and gave it an 8.5: "Rocksmith is an absolute must buy for anyone slightly interested in learning how to truly rock." Amy Flower of Gamesblip was very impressed, rating the game 9/10: "Rocksmith's adaptability to your particular chops kicks arse. If you've never touched a geetaw you'll probably squonk like a Sonic Youth b-side, but patience and dedication brings reward."

However, Jordan Mallory of Joystiq gave the game a mediocre 2 1/2/5 on the day of its release, stating that "...Rocksmith fails as both an educational platform and as a rhythm title, despite its groundbreaking technological foundations." Ben Kuchera of Ars Technica said the game is "not terrible", but that it "fails as a way to learn guitar" due to lag, the automated difficulty adjustments, and the way the unlock system is implemented.

== Legal issues ==
When Ubisoft applied for a European trademark on the name "Rocksmith" in March 2011, an official opposition was filed by a band of the same name from Southend, England. The band claims to have been using the name for four years and had it registered for eight. In August 2012, the case was settled in favor of Ubisoft by the European Office for Harmonization in the Internal Market.

Ubisoft filed for and received a United States patent, U.S. Patent 9,839,852, for an "Interactive guitar game" based on the principles of Rocksmith. Ubisoft subsequently filed a patent-infringement case against Yousician, a mobile app aimed to teach users how to play musical instruments which used similar principles as Rocksmith. In August 2019, a federal district court ruled that the patent claims of Ubisoft were too broad and not defined in enough specificity, nullifying the patent and dismissing Ubisoft's suit. The decision was confirmed on appeal to the United States Court of Appeals for the Federal Circuit in June 2020.

== Downloadable content ==
=== DLC Amps and Gear ===
Name	Type	Pack	Date
Tone Designer Time Saver	All Standard Pedals	Tone Designer Time Saver Pack	October 18, 2011
SicSicSicS	Distortion Pedal	Heavy Metal – Gear Pack	February 28, 2012
Caverb	Delay Pedal	Heavy Metal – Gear Pack	February 28, 2012
Scooped	Filter Pedal	Heavy Metal – Gear Pack	February 28, 2012
RSMP-12	High-Gain Amp	Heavy Metal – Gear Pack	February 28, 2012
RSMP-12 4×12	Cabinet	Heavy Metal – Gear Pack	February 28, 2012

== See also ==
- List of music software
