= Stupid Love (album) =

Studio album by Mindy Smith
- Released: August 11, 2009
- Genre: Folk, country, pop
- Length: 47:09
- Label: Vanguard
- Producer: Mindy Smith, Ian Fitchuck, Justin Loucks

Mindy Smith chronology
My Holiday (2007)	Stupid Love (2009)	Mindy Smith (2012)

Professional ratings
Review scores
Source	Rating
AllMusic	link
PopMatters	link
Rolling Stone	link
Slant	link

Stupid Love is the fourth album by American singer-songwriter Mindy Smith, released in 2009 on Vanguard Records. The songs were written over a two-year period and the sound of the album moves away from country and closer to that of a pop record. Country artist Vince Gill provides harmony vocals on the track “Telescope” while Amy Grant adds vocals to "Couldn't Stand the Rain". Stupid Love was co-produced by Mindy along with Ian Fitchuk and Justin Loucks.

== Reviews ==
The album has garnered mixed reviews from music critics, with a generally favourable reception.

== Track listing ==
All songs written by Mindy Smith except where noted.

1. "What Went Wrong" – 3:24
2. "Highs and Lows" – 2:55
3. "If I Didn't Know Any Better" – 3:55 (Smith, John Scott Sherrill)
4. "Love Lost" – 4:14
5. "Telescope" – 3:03
6. "What Love Can Do" – 3:10
7. "Couldn't Stand the Rain" – 4:28
8. "Bad Guy" – 2:19 (Smith, Kate York, and Betsy Roo)
9. "Surface" – 3:57 (Smith, Susan Ashton)
10. "Disappointed" – 2:30
11. "True Love of Mine" – 4:29 (Smith, Daniel Tashian)
12. "Love Chases After Me" – 4:35 (Smith, Thad Cockrell)
13. "Take a Holiday" – 4:18 (Smith, Angelo Petraglia)
14. "Little Lies" – 4:17 (Christine McVie and Eddy Quintela) *iTunes Bonus Track

== Personnel ==
- Mindy Smith – vocals, recorder, beer bottle, iPhone
- Justin Loucks – piano, keyboards, percussion, banjo, harmonica, drums, programming, yazoo growler
- Ian Fitchuk – guitar, vocals, drums, percussion, bass, piano, keyboards, iPhone, programming
- Daniel Tashian – guitar, vocals
- Court Clement – twelve–string guitar
- Neal Dahlgren – pedal steel guitar
- Kyle Ryan – electric guitar
- Lex Price – acoustic guitar
- Gary Burnett – acoustic guitar
- David Davidson – strings
- Matt Slocum – cello
- Vince Gill – vocals on "Telescope"
- Amy Grant – vocals on "Couldn't Stand the Rain"
- Leigh Nash – vocals on "What Love Can Do"
- Susan Ashton – vocals on "Surface"
- Thad Cockrell – backing vocals
- Kate York – backing vocals
- Betsy Roo – backing vocals
- Jeremy Lister – backing vocals and whistle
- Madi Diaz – backing vocals
- Peter Groenwald – backing vocals
- Mikky Ekko – backing vocals
- Micol Davis – tambourine
- Rachael Carlson – ice

== Production ==
- Producer: Mindy Smith, Ian Fitchuck and Justin Loucks
- Engineer: Justin Loucks
- Mixing: Justin Loucks
- Mastering: Bob Boyd
- Cover art and Photography: Traci Goudie
- Package Layout: Carrie Smith

== Charts ==
Chart performance for Stupid Love
Album Chart (2009)	Peak position
US Billboard 200	122
US Top Rock Albums (Billboard)	45
US Heatseekers Albums (Billboard)	1
