= Rocksmith+ =

Music education software

- Developer: Ubisoft San Francisco (Note: Additional work by Ubisoft Osaka, Ubisoft Pune and Ubisoft Bucharest)
- Release: Microsoft Windows; September 6, 2022; Android, iOS; June 9, 2023; PlayStation 4, PlayStation 5 June 6, 2024
- Engine: Snowdrop
- Platform: Microsoft Windows; Android iOS; PlayStation 4 PlayStation 5
- Type: Music software
- Website: www.ubisoft.com/en-us/game/rocksmith/plus

Rocksmith+ is a subscription-based music education software service from Ubisoft focused on learning instruments guitar, bass, and piano. It was released September 6, 2022 for Microsoft Windows and June 9, 2023 on Android and iOS and follows Rocksmith 2014. It was updated on December 5, 2023 to include piano and keyboard learning. Versions for PlayStation 4 and PlayStation 5 were released on June 6, 2024.

== Software ==
Rocksmith+ is a follow-up to the original Rocksmith franchise, with a major change to a subscription-based music education service. Using their own instruments, users play along to songs in the Rocksmith+ library, with genres including rock, pop, hip hop, country, Latin and R&B. For piano, the platform includes arrangements from pop, classical, soundtracks, and other genres.

Players can connect an acoustic, electric, or bass guitar via a special USB jack (called the Rocksmith Real Tone cable), audio interface, or via a smartphone’s microphone with the use of the free Rocksmith+ Connect mobile app. Players can also use Rocksmith Workshop to create and add their own guitar arrangements. Ubisoft also offers a free guitar tuning app for iOS and Android called Rocksmith Tuner.

In addition to guitar, Rocksmith+ also offers piano lessons, with the choice of a falling notes 3D interface or traditional sheet music view. At the piano feature’s initial launch, Rocksmith+ offered 400 piano arrangements from artists including Coldplay, Billy Joel, and covers from Elton John, Van Halen and Pantera.

== Development ==
Ubisoft announced the Rocksmith+ subscription service at Ubisoft Forward during E3 2021. Rocksmith+ was announced to launch in Fall 2021 for the PlayStation 4, PlayStation 5, Xbox One, Xbox Series X/S, and PC, and on Android and iOS at a later date.

A Rocksmith+ closed beta for Windows ran in July 2021. The beta library had roughly 500 songs, with the expectation of increasing to thousands at launch. In September 2021, Ubisoft announced that the Rocksmith+ release date would be delayed until 2022, to make changes based on beta user feedback. It released on September 6, 2022 for Microsoft Windows. On June 9, 2023 the Rocksmith+ mobile app released on iOS and Android.

On December 5, 2023, Ubisoft announced an update to Rocksmith+ adding piano and keyboard learning on iOS, Android or PC.

== Reception ==
=== Beta version ===
Beta reviews were generally positive while noting a desire for more songs and improved features, and cautious optimism waiting to see what the final product will be and how the song library would expand over time.
