= Only Ghosts =

Studio album by Red Fang
- Released: October 14, 2016
- Genre: Stoner metal
- Length: 40:57
- Label: Relapse
- Producers: Red Fang, Ross Robinson

Red Fang chronology
Whales and Leeches (2013)	Only Ghosts (2016)	Arrows (2021)

Singles from Only Ghosts
- 1. "Flies" Released: July 13, 2016; 2. "Shadows" Released: September 19, 2016

Professional ratings
Review scores
Source	Rating
Blabbermouth.net	9/10 stars
Metal Injection	7/10 stars
MetalSucks	4/5 stars
New Noise Magazine	4.5/5 stars

Only Ghosts is the fourth album by the American stoner metal band Red Fang, released in 2016 via Relapse Records.

== Track list ==
All tracks written by Red Fang.

No.	Title	Length
1.	"Flies"	3:37
2.	"Cut It Short"	4:11
3.	"Flames"	1:30
4.	"No Air"	4:52
5.	"Shadows"	3:11
6.	"Not for You"	3:19
7.	"The Smell of the Sound"	5:23
8.	"The Deep"	4:27
9.	"I Am a Ghost"	4:08
10.	"Living in Lye"	6:19

Limited deluxe edition bonus track
No.	Title	Length
11.	"Feeder"	6:40

Digital deluxe edition bonus tracks
No.	Title	Length
11.	"Dumb Guy" (instrumental)	3:12
12.	"One Hit Two Hit" (instrumental)	5:20

== Personnel ==
Red Fang

- Aaron Beam - bass, vocals, synthesizers
- Maurice Bryan Giles - guitar, vocals
- John Sherman - drums, percussion
- David Sullivan - guitar, synthesizers

Production

- Ross Robinson - production, engineering
- Red Fang and Ross Robinson - arrangement
- Michael "Lightning" Balboa - engineering
- Joe Barresi - mixing
- Dave Collins - mastering
