= The Wee Hours Revue =

Studio album by Roman Candle
- Released: June 20, 2006
- Genre: Alternative country, Alternative rock
- Label: V2 Records
- Producer: Chris Stamey, Roman Candle, John Alagía

Roman Candle chronology
Says Pop (2002)	The Wee Hours Revue (2006)	Oh Tall Tree in the Ear (2009)

Professional ratings
Review scores
Source	Rating
Allmusic	link
The Boston Globe	link
The Brooklyn Rail	link
Pitchfork Media	7.6/10 link
PopMatters	8/10

The Wee Hours Revue is the major label debut album by American alternative rock band Roman Candle, released in 2006.

== Background and production ==
Many of the songs were reworked from their debut recording Says Pop, which was released in 2002 via a small independent label, Outlook Music, run by NFL defensive end Trevor Pryce. The band was later signed to a contract by Hollywood Records, who paid to re-record their album but set it on the shelf for two years before dropping the band altogether. V2 Records stepped in and bought the rights to the re-recorded tracks and set a June 20, 2006 release date for the record. The album was recorded predominantly in Chapel Hill, North Carolina, at Chris Stamey's studio, Modern Recording. Both Chris Stamey and Roman Candle are credited as producing the album. The thirteen tracks were mixed by a host of mixer-producers, including Tony Hoffer, John Alagia, John Agnello, John Plymale, Chris Stamey, and Tim Harper.

== Track listing ==
All songs written by Roman Candle.

1. "Something Left to Say" – 4:14
2. "You Don't Belong to This World" – 3:49
3. "Another Summer" – 3:14
4. "I Didn't Mind it at All" – 4:22
5. "New York This Morning" – 3:35
6. "Help Me if You Can" – 4:01
7. "Baby's Got it in the Genes" – 3:20
8. "Winterlight" – 3:52
9. "I've Got a Reason" – 3:52
10. "Merciful Man" – 3:56
11. "Sookie" – 5:25
12. "From an Airplane Window" – 4:37
13. "Driving at Morning" – 4:02
