= Murder the Mountains =

Studio album by Red Fang
- Released: April 12, 2011
- Studio: Type Foundry Studio, Portland and at Blackbird Studios, Nashville
- Genre: Stoner metal; sludge metal
- Length: 42:12
- Label: Relapse
- Producer: Red Fang; Chris Funk

Red Fang chronology
| Red Fang (2009) | Murder the Mountains (2011) | Whales and Leeches (2013) |

Singles from Murder the Mountains
- 1. "Wires" Released: March 15, 2011

Murder the Mountains is the second studio album by American stoner metal band Red Fang, released in 2011. Music videos were released for the songs "Wires" and "Hank Is Dead".

== Critical reception ==
Professional ratings
Review scores
| Source | Rating |
|---|---|
| AllMusic | 3.5/5 stars |

Reviews of Murder the Mountains were positive, with repeated admiration for the heaviness of their riffs and parts. Different influences were noted by reviewers, ranging from proto-metal to punk to sludge.

== Use in media ==
The song "Number Thirteen" was a playable song in the video game Rocksmith. "Wires" was a playable song in the follow-up game Rocksmith 2014.

Wires was played in episode 211 of the Canadian show Todd and the Book of Pure Evil.

== Track listing ==
All tracks are written by Red Fang, except where noted.

| No. | Title | Length |
|---|---|---|
| 1. | "Malverde" | 4:04 |
| 2. | "Wires" | 5:45 |
| 3. | "Hank Is Dead" | 2:38 |
| 4. | "Dirt Wizard" | 2:59 |
| 5. | "Throw Up" | 6:35 |
| 6. | "Painted Parade" | 2:29 |
| 7. | "Number Thirteen" | 4:47 |
| 8. | "Into the Eye" | 4:00 |
| 9. | "The Undertow" | 5:04 |
| 10. | "Human Herd" | 3:51 |

Deluxe digital edition bonus tracks
| No. | Title | Length |
|---|---|---|
| 11. | "Over the Edge" (Wipers cover) | 3:57 |
| 12. | "Through" (No Talent cover) | 4:42 |
| 13. | "Pawn Everything" | 1:24 |

== Personnel ==
Red Fang

- Maurice Bryan Giles – guitars, vocals
- Aaron Beam – bass, vocals
- David Sullivan – guitars
- John Sherman – drums

Additional musicians

- Anita Robinson – guitars
- Kevin Robinson – percussion, effects
- Jenny Conlee – organ
- Chris Funk – slide guitar, percussion

Production

- Orion Landau – artwork
- Kevin Robinson – recording
- Adam Selzer – recording
- Chris Funk – producer
- Mike Rooney – assistant mixing
- Vance Powell – mixing
- Carl Saff – mastering
