= One Moment More =

Studio album by Mindy Smith
- Released: January 27, 2004
- Genre: American, folk, country
- Length: 53:06
- Label: Vanguard
- Producer: Steve Buckingham, Mindy Smith

Mindy Smith chronology
One Moment More (2004)	Long Island Shores (2006)

Professional ratings
Review scores
Source	Rating
AllMusic	4/5 stars

One Moment More is the debut album by American singer-songwriter Mindy Smith.

In 2003, she was invited by producer Steve Buckingham to record a cover version of "Jolene" for the tribute album Just Because I'm a Woman: Songs of Dolly Parton. That song drew attention to Smith, a native of Long Island, New York, who had moved to Nashville. She signed with the jazz label Vanguard Records and released her debut album in 2004. It was produced by Buckingham, who is a member of the Country Music Hall of Fame. During the same year, Smith won the award for Emerging Artist of the Year from the Americana Music Association.

The song "Come to Jesus" reached the Billboard charts. The Gaither Vocal Band recorded a cover version that won Bluegrass Song of the Year at the Dove Awards in 2012. Ten years after her recording, Smith said, "I believe God breathed it through me, and I was able to put it to paper." One Moment More is named after a song on the album that addresses the death of her mother. Similarly, the rest of the album deals with loss, struggle, and renewal.

The album sold over 400,000 copies.

== Track listing ==
All tracks are written by Mindy Smith except where noted.

No.	Title	Length
1.	"Come to Jesus"	4:14
2.	"Falling"	3:35
3.	"Raggedy Ann"	4:55
4.	"Fighting for It All"	3:19
5.	"Train Song"	3:22
6.	"It's Amazing"	3:40
7.	"Angel Doves"	3:56
8.	"Down in Flames"	4:12
9.	"Hurricane"	3:33
10.	"Hard to Know"	3:06
11.	"One Moment More"	3:47
12.	"Jolene" (Dolly Parton)	4:20

== Personnel ==
- Mindy Smith – vocals
- Steve Buckingham – dulcimer, acoustic guitar, electric guitar, Hammond organ
- Dan Dugmore – steel guitar, lap steel guitar
- Will Kimbrough – electric guitar
- Sonny Landreth – slide guitar
- Bryan Sutton – acoustic guitar, guitar
- Kenny Vaughan – electric guitar
- David Jacques – bass guitar
- Viktor Krauss – bass
- Glenn Worf – bass
- Lex Price – mandolin
- Chris Carmichael – violin, cello, viola
- David Angell – violin
- Pamela Sixfin – violin
- Kathryn Vanosdale – violin
- Connie Ellisor – violin
- Kristin Wilkinson – viola
- Jim Grosjean – viola
- Matt Rollings – Hammond organ
- Steve Conn – Hammond organ, accordion
- John Deaderick – piano, keyboard
- Shannon Forrest – drums
- Paul Griffith – drums, percussion
- Dolly Parton – harmony vocals
- Daniel Tashian – harmony vocals

== Production ==
- Producers: Steve Buckingham, Mindy Smith
- Engineers: Scott Baggett, Neal Cappellino, Paul Hart, Marshall Morgan, Gary Paczosa, Bart Pursley
- Assistant engineers: Paul Hart, Thomas Johnson
- Mixing: Gary Paczosa
- Mastering: Robert Hadley, Doug Sax
- String arrangements: Kristin Wilkinson

== Charts ==
Chart performance for One Moment More
Album Chart (2004)	Peak position
UK Country Albums (OCC)	3
UK Independent Albums (OCC)	34
US Billboard 200	143
US Independent Albums (Billboard)	6
US Heatseekers Albums (Billboard)	2

Chart performance for Come to Jesus
Singles Chart (2004)	Peak position
US Adult Pop Airplay (Billboard)	35
US Adult Alternative Airplay (Billboard)	9
