= The Bobby Lees =

American rock band

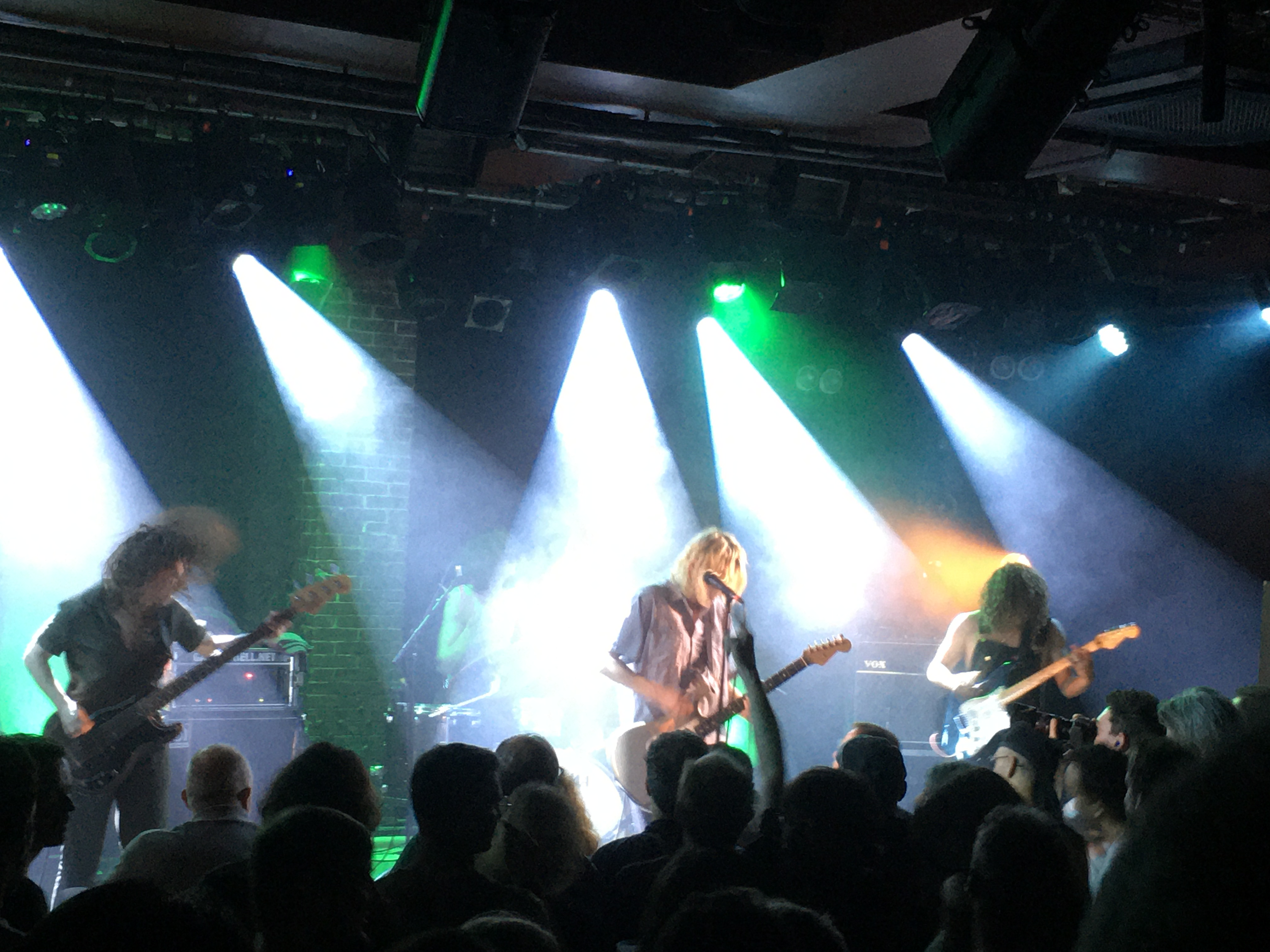
- The Bobby Lees in concert Maroquinerie, Paris

Background information
- Origin: Woodstock, New York, United States
- Genres: Rock and roll; garage rock; punk rock
- Years active: 2018–present
- Labels: Alive Naturalsound; Ipecac; Epitaph
- Members: Sam Quartin; Kendall Wind; Macky Bowman; Nick Casa (former)
- Website: www.thebobbylees.com

The Bobby Lees are an American rock music group founded in 2018 in Woodstock, New York. The band comprises vocalist and guitarist Sam Quartin, bassist Kendall Wind and drummer Macky Bowman.

The band's name originates from a hallucination experienced by Sam Quartin, in which she believed she saw a ghost named Bobby Lee. The song "Bobby Lee", from their debut album, was written based on this experience.

== History ==
Their debut album, Beauty Pageant, was released in 2018. Its success led to The Bobby Lees opening for The Black Lips, Shannon & the Clams, Future Islands, and the Chats. While touring in support of the album, the band's gear was stolen during a stop in Tulsa, Oklahoma. Despite this setback, they managed to perform using borrowed equipment from local bands.

In 2019, they self-released Beauty Pageant Redux, a live album featuring live versions of songs from their debut album, Beauty Pageant, along with two previously unreleased tracks.

Their 2020 record Skin Suit was produced by Jon Spencer and released via Alive Naturalsound Records. Skin Suit made the San Francisco Examiner Top 10 Albums of 2020 List and was called "a raucous ride from beginning to end" by PopMatters. In 2021, the group toured with Helmet in support of Skin Suit.

In 2022, it was announced the band had signed with Ipecac Recordings and would release a four-song EP titled Hollywood Junkyard, produced by Vance Powell. Later that year, in October, they released their third studio, Bellevue, also produced by Powell.

On November 2, 2023, the band announced they were going on hiatus after completing their scheduled performances. In a statement on social media, they criticized streaming services, particularly Spotify, for devaluing music, making it difficult for mid-sized bands to sustain themselves. After announcing their hiatus, actor Jason Momoa contacted the band and offered to finance a new album. Reflecting on his decision, Momoa stated, "I wanted to use my voice and platform to help in any way possible. Bands like this should be all over the world. They are amazing artists, and they deserve our support."

On October 9, 2025, the band announced that they had signed with Epitaph Records and release their first single with the label, "Napoleon". On March 4, 2026, the band announced their fourth studio album, New Self, which was released on June 12, 2026.

== Discography ==
=== Studio albums ===
- Beauty Pageant (February 2, 2018)
- Skin Suit (July 17, 2020)
- Bellevue (October 7, 2022)
- New Self (June 12, 2026)

=== EPs ===
- Hollywood Junkyard (2022)

=== Live albums ===
- Beauty Pageant Redux (2019)

=== Singles ===
- "Napoleon" (2025)
