= Bellevue (album) =

Studio album by the Bobby Lees
- Released: October 7, 2022
- Studios: Sputnik Sound, Nashville, Tennessee
- Genres: Garage rock, punk rock
- Label: Ipecac
- Producer: Vance Powell

The Bobby Lees chronology
Skin Suit (2020)	Bellevue (2022)	New Self (2026)

Professional ratings
Review scores
Source	Rating
AllMusic	3.5/5 stars
New Noise	5/5 stars
PopMatters	8/10
Sputnikmusic	4/5 stars
Boolin Tunes	7/10

Bellevue is the third studio album by American rock band the Bobby Lees, released on October 7, 2022 through Ipecac Recordings.

== Background ==
Bellevue followed the release of the Bobby Lees’ second studio album, Skin Suit (2020), and marked the band’s first release for Ipecac Recordings. The group signed to the label after Henry Rollins shared the band's recordings with Ipecac representatives, leading to their inclusion on the roster.

The album’s material was written during a period of transition for the band, with vocalist and guitarist Sam Quartin drawing on personal experiences that included mental health struggles and sobriety. In interviews, Quartin stated that the songs were written without a fixed conceptual plan, instead emerging organically over time. She later said she felt more satisfied with Bellevue overall than the band’s previous albums.

== Track listing ==
Bellevue track listing
No.	Title	Length
1.	"Bellevue"	1:23
2.	"Hollywood Junkyard"	3:13
3.	"Ma Likes to Drink"	1:41
4.	"Death Train"	3:01
5.	"Strange Days"	3:34
6.	"Dig Your Hips"	3:18
7.	"Have You Seen a Girl"	1:42
8.	"In Low"	1:41
9.	"Little Table"	2:19
10.	"Monkey Mind"	2:18
11.	"Greta Van Fake"	2:17
12.	"Be My Enemy"	3:26
13.	"Mystery Theme Song"	1:44
Total length:		31:37

== Personnel ==
Credits adapted from the album's liner notes.

=== The Bobby Lees ===
- Sam Quartin – vocals, guitar
- Kendall Wind – bass, keys
- Nick Casa – lead guitar
- Macky Brown – drums

=== Additional contributors ===
- Vance Powell – production, recording
- Pete Lyman – mastering, mixing
- Mike Fahey – recording, mixing
- John Swab - cover photo
- Naoko Saito – layout
