= You Belong Here =

Studio album by Leagues
- Released: January 29, 2013
- Genres: Alternative rock, indie rock
- Length: 39:19
- Label: Bufalotone
- Producers: Leagues, Paul Moak

Leagues chronology
You Belong Here (2013)	Alone Together (2016)

You Belong Here is the debut studio album by the American rock band Leagues. The album was released by Bufalotone Records on January 29, 2013, and it was produced by Leagues and Paul Moak. The album attracted commercial success and positive critical attention.

== Critical reception ==
Professional ratings
Review scores
Source	Rating
Iowa State Daily	3.5/5 stars
Indie Vision Music	4/5 stars
Knoxville News Sentinel	4/5 stars

You Belong Here garnered positive reception from four music critics ratings and reviews. At Knoxville News Sentinel, Chuck Campbell rated the album four out of five stars, stating that the release "is even better for listeners as the band concocts imaginative tracks by drawing on its decidedly diverse talent yet possibly indecisive direction." Carter Fraser of Indie Vision Music rated the album four out of five stars, writing that "Leagues give this winter some summer flair with You Belong Here", which "Perhaps they'll strike you as relaxing; perhaps they'll make you want to dance", but "Either way, they have some undeniably entertaining charm." At Iowa State Daily, Emily Belloma rated the album three-and-a-half stars out of five, saying that the release is "quirky and fun", yet at the same time it "may make you want to dance, or you could find it incredibly relaxing. Either way, it is entertaining and is definitely worth checking out." Joe Cirilo of The Aquarian Weekly gave a positive review of the album, remarking how "You Belong Here, is one built on great highs, tastefully executed lows, and all around, leaves little to be desired", however "On the whole, the indie pop group did an immaculate job putting their record together" because it is "bold, fun, and leaves the fans on the hook, hungry for more."

=== Awards and accolades ===
At Relevant, They pegged the album as the No. 7 of "The 10 Best Albums of 2013".

== Chart performance ==
For the Billboard charting week of February 16, 2013, the album peaked at Nos. 12 and 48 on the Top Heatseekers Albums and Independent Albums charts. respectively.

== Track listing ==
All tracks are written by Leagues.

Standard edition
No.	Title	Length
1.	"Spotlight"	3:22
2.	"You Belong Here"	3:38
3.	"Haunted"	4:29
4.	"Walking Backwards"	4:11
5.	"Lost It All"	4:51
6.	"One Hand"	4:34
7.	"Magic"	3:37
8.	"Mind Games"	4:03
9.	"Pass My Way"	3:35
10.	"Friendly Fire"	2:59
Total length:		39:19

All tracks are written by Leagues.

Deluxe edition
No.	Title	Length
11.	"Walking Backwards (Canon Blue Remix)"	4:43
12.	"Walking on Water"	3:54
13.	"She Kissed Me"	4:07
14.	"One Hand (Body Talkr Remix)"	4:31
15.	"Magic (Radio Version)"	3:28
16.	"Magic (Body Talkr Remix)"	3:10
Total length:		63:12

== Charts ==
Chart (2013)	Peak position
US Heatseekers Albums (Billboard)	12
US Independent Albums (Billboard)	48
