= Whales and Leeches =

Studio album by Red Fang
- Released: October 15, 2013
- Recorded: Type Foundry Studio, Portland and Walker, Portland.
- Genre: Stoner metal
- Length: 41:14
- Label: Relapse
- Producer: Red Fang, Chris Funk

Red Fang chronology
Murder the Mountains (2011)	Whales and Leeches (2013)	Only Ghosts (2016)

Singles from Whales and Leeches
- 1. "Crows in Swine" Released: September 2012; 2. "Blood Like Cream" Released: August 27, 2013; 3. "No Hope" Released: September 23, 2013

Whales and Leeches is the third album by the American stoner metal band Red Fang, released in 2013 on Relapse Records.

== Track listing ==
All tracks are written by Aaron Beam, Maurice Bryan Giles, David Sullivan, and John Sherman, except where noted.

No.	Title	Writer(s)	Length
1.	"DOEN"		3:18
2.	"Blood Like Cream"		3:33
3.	"No Hope"		2:58
4.	"Crows in Swine"		3:01
5.	"Voices of the Dead"		2:43
6.	"Behind the Light"		2:44
7.	"Dawn Rising"	Beam, Giles, Sullivan, Sherman, Mike Scheidt	7:01
8.	"Failure"		4:57
9.	"1516"		3:37
10.	"This Animal"		2:42
11.	"Every Little Twist"		4:40

Deluxe edition CD bonus tracks
No.	Title	Length
12.	"Murder the Mountains"	1:54
13.	"Black Water"	4:40

iTunes deluxe edition
No.	Title	Length
14.	"It's Always There"	2:46

== Critical reception ==
Professional ratings
Aggregate scores
Source	Rating
Metacritic	71/100
Review scores
Source	Rating
Allmusic	4/5 stars
Pitchfork	5/10 stars
Exclaim!	7/10 stars
Punknews	3.5/5 stars

There was a high level of critical reception for the album, with reviews varying from mixed to positive.

Quietus felt that the album was appreciable by a broad audience with its catchy refrains but was repetitive and lacked the substance of the band's prior works.

Punknews was slightly positive, again raising concerns that certain songs were repetitive. However Blood Like Cream was exulted as their catchiest song to date. Overall, the reviewer notes that though the album is indistinguishable from others in the genre, for those who like "loud sludgy riffs, face-melting solos and Ozzy-esque vocal hooks, Red Fang will satisfy your appetite".

Exclaim! had mostly positive comments on the album, stating that though similar in nature to their prior music, the music was a major refinement on prior efforts, to form a particularly aggressive variation of stoner rock.

AllMusic reported positively, feeling that Red Fang had managed to operate on two levels with the release, managing "to get psychedelic without abandoning the non-stop riff-fests that made their first two albums such a welcome change of pace". In doing so, it was rated with other successful stand outs of the genre for retaining quality while adding complexity, coupled with being suitable for a wider range of audiences.

Pitchfork had mixed or negative analysis of the album. While the technical competence of Red Fang were appreciated, an absence of substance in the music, coupled with extreme repetitiveness, was felt to make the album difficult going and unsuitable for repeat listening.

== Personnel ==
Red Fang

- Aaron Beam – bass, vocals, additional guitars, production
- Maurice Bryan Giles – guitars, vocals, production
- David Sullivan – guitars, production
- John Sherman – drums, production

Additional musicians

- Roger Joseph Manning Jr. – keyboards, piano, and synthesizer on "Crows in Swine"
- Mike Scheidt – vocals on "Dawn Rising"
- Pall Jenkins – vocals and musical saw on "Every Little Twist"

Production personnel

- Chris Funk – production, engineering, organ, synthesizer, tambourine
- Graeme Gibson – engineering
- Adam Selzer – engineering
- Vance Powell – mixing
- Eddie Spear – mixing assistant
- Pete Lyman – mastering
- Orion Landau – artwork, layout
