= Leagues (band) =

American rock band

- Origin: Nashville, Tennessee, U.S.
- Genres: Alternative rock, indie rock
- Years active: 2013–present
- Labels: Bufalotone, Dualtone
- Members: Thad Cockrell; Jeremy Lutito
- Past members: Tyler Burkum; Mike Simons
- Website: leaguesmusic.com

Leagues is an American rock band from Nashville, Tennessee that formed in 2013. The band are made up of Thad Cockrell and Jeremy Lutito. They released their first studio album in 2013 entitled You Belong Here that was released by Bufalotone Records. The album saw commercial charting successes, and it garnered positive reception from music critics.

== Background ==
The band started on January 29, 2013, with members Thad Cockrell on lead vocals, former Audio Adrenaline guitarist Tyler Burkum on guitars, Mike Simons on bass guitar, and drummer and former Jars of Clay touring member Jeremy Lutito. In 2013, the band signed with Bufalotone Records.

They released their debut studio album, You Belong Here on January 29, 2013. For the Billboard charting week of February 16, 2013, the album charted at Nos. 12 and 48 on the Top Heatseekers Albums and Independent Albums charts. The album was met with positive reviews from Knoxville News Sentinel, The Aquarian Weekly, Iowa State Daily, and Indie Vision Music. The album was the No. 7 on "The 10 Best Albums of 2013" by Relevant.

Burkum left the band to rejoin Mat Kearney in 2016.

In September 2016, they released their second album, Alone Together.

== Discography ==
Studio albums

List of studio albums, with selected chart positions
Title	Album details	Peak chart positions	
Title	Album details	US HEAT	US INDIE
You Belong Here	Released: January 29, 2013; Label: Bufalotone; CD, digital download	12	48
Alone Together	Released: September 9, 2016; Label: Bufalotone; CD, digital download		
