= Thad Cockrell =

American singer-songwriter

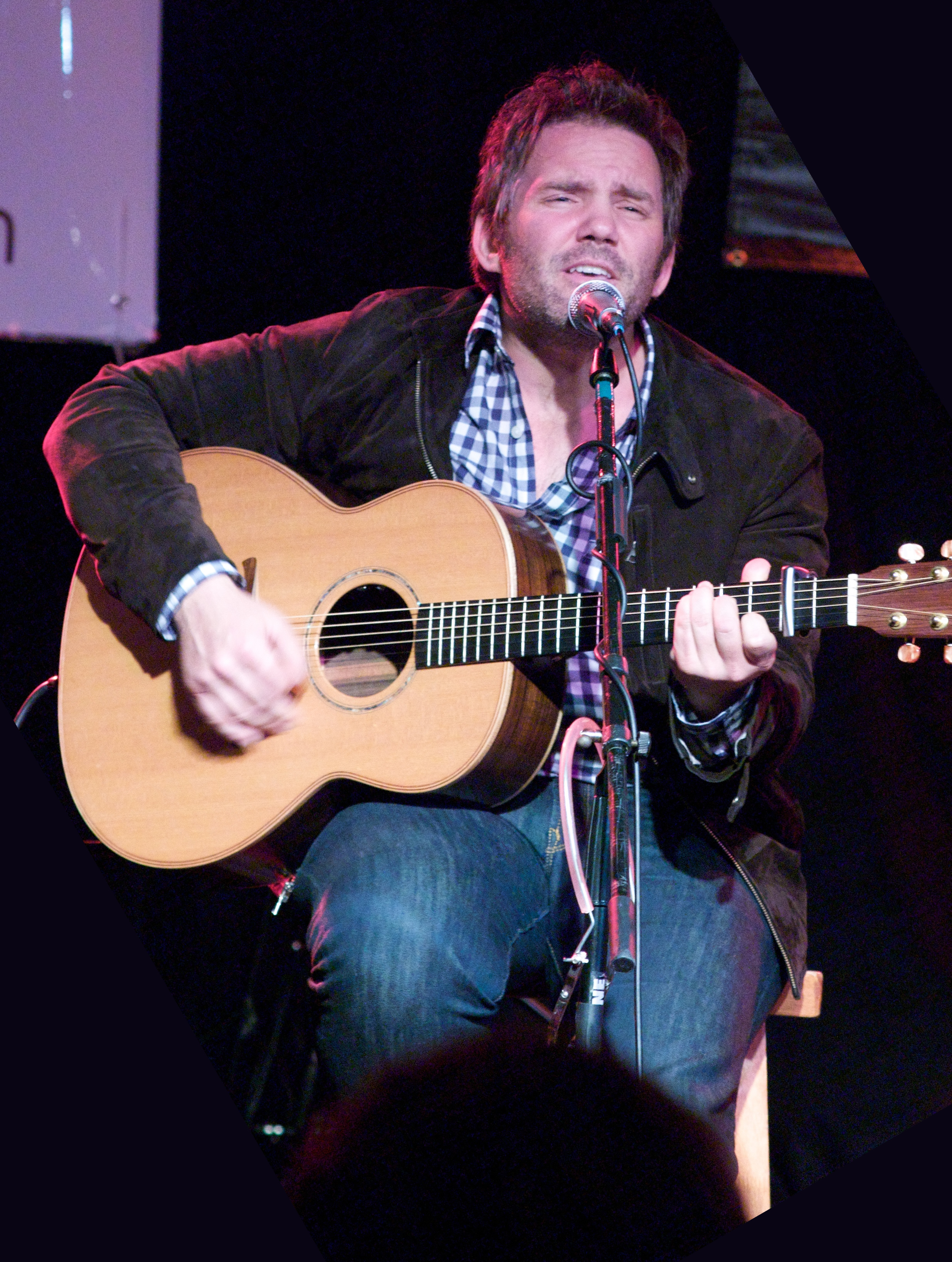
- Thad Cockrell, Nashville 2003

Background information
- Birth name: Thad Aaron Cockrell
- Born: North Carolina, U.S.
- Genres: Indie rock, alternative rock, gospel, alternative country
- Occupation(s): Singer, songwriter, musician
- Instrument: Guitar
- Years active: 1990s–present
- Labels: ATO Records Yep Roc
- Member of: Leagues

Thad Aaron Cockrell is an American singer-songwriter. He has released five solo albums, along with a collaborative album with Caitlin Cary and two albums with Leagues. Cockrell often writes emotional songs with the intent of inclusion.

== Early life ==
Cockrell, the son of a Baptist pastor, grew up mostly in Tampa, Florida. His father was the pastor of an Independent Fundamental Baptist Church, and president of Cockrell's school. While in school, Cockrell discovered his love of country music and rock n' roll, which was forbidden in his home. Cockrell cites bands such as The Everly Brothers, The Cure, and Nelson as early influences.

After high school Cockrell went on to graduate from Liberty University. He then studied at the Southeastern Baptist Theological Seminary in Wake Forest, North Carolina. It was there that Cockrell would begin writing songs.

== Music career ==
Cockrell recorded his first album Stack of Dreams with Chris Stamey of The dB's. It was recorded in one day as a demo. Cockrell liked it so much, he began selling it at his shows as an EP. Eventually, the recording was remixed and given another track for the album's release on Yep Roc Records in 2001. Cockrell's friends and former Whiskeytown members Caitlin Cary and Skillet Gilmore played on the album. AllMusic gives a favorable review of Cockrell's debut, describing his voice as "the kind of high, lonesome warble that can raise the hair on your neck and put a tear in your eye", and the album as "striking a nice balance between not-so-rowdy honky tonk and heart-worn balladry".

In 2003 Cockrell again worked with producer Stamey for his second release Warmth and Beauty. CMT.com picked the album as a top independent release. Allmusic proclaimed that the album is "pure country music, untainted by commercial considerations and without rock influences". Cary and Tift Merritt lent harmony vocals on the song "Why Go".

Cockrell again collaborated with Cary for the 2005 duet album Begonias. A review in the Washington Post praises the album for conveying the complexities of marriage, writing that it is "as good a traditional country album as we're likely to hear this year". Alternative country magazine No Depression praises Cockrell's lyrics as "straightforward simplicity", and also compliments the singing on the album as "intimate, immediate and intentionally under-rehearsed to capture an edge of freshness".

After the three Yep Roc releases Cockrell moved to Nashville to focus on songwriting for financial reasons. He wrote and co-wrote songs for Lost Highway artist Donavon Frankenreiter and Universal Records artist Courtney Jaye. Cockrell continued to perform in Nashville. According to collaborator and Roman Candle's leader Skip Matheny, Cockrell was "more popular than ever". However, reflecting a desire to "write less and find a community where he could be more than a musician", Cockrell left Nashville to return to North Carolina.

During his time in Nashville, Cockrell co-wrote and recorded a duet with Mindy Smith for her 2007 Christmas album My Holiday, entitled "I Know the Reason".

On October 13, 2009, Cockrell's first solo album in six years, To Be Loved, was released. It is described as "a collection that mixed lush, brooding melodicism and rustic, folk-y shuffles". Cockrell commented that it is "more me than any previous release". Independent Weekly says it is "a conflict-driven mix of love songs for Jesus and women. It laces gospel and country influences into gentle, loping tunes". It was recorded in Nashville with producer Jason Lehning, who has also worked with Alison Krauss.

Cockrell also performs with a Nashville band, Leagues.

In the spring of 2016, Cockrell announced that he was working on his fifth solo album If In Case You Feel The Same, which was released via ATO Records in 2020.

2020-2021

Cockrell performed on American late-night talk show The Tonight Show Starring Jimmy Fallon on January 26, 2021, as a Zoom guest of 2021 alongside The Roots. The host and comedian Jimmy Fallon heard Cockrell's song "Swingin'" at a hardware store during the COVID-19 pandemic, and used Shazam to find the track, and was so drawn to it that he wanted Thad to perform on the show. On January 28, 2021, Cockrell appeared on The Today Show. On the same day, the single hit Number 1 on ITunes songs charts and the album If In Case You Feel The Same hit number 2 on the album charts.

Religion

Cockrell is the only child amongst three sons not to become a pastor. While Cockrell has many songs reflecting his faith, it has been noted that Cockrell's overall body of work doesn't consistently contain these themes. He has commented that he has "lost fans for his religious convictions and alienated some Christians with songs that aren't always about God". An extensive Cockrell feature in Independent Weekly concludes that "archetypal conflict—secular pleasures and aims versus Christian tenets and rules—has powered Cockrell's songwriting".

== Discography ==
Year	Title	Label
2001	Stack of Dreams	Yep Roc
2003	Warmth and Beauty	Yep Roc
2005	Begonias (with Caitlin Cary)	Yep Roc
2009	To Be Loved	Major 7
2016	Alone Together (with Leagues)	Dualtone
2020	If In Case You Feel The Same	ATO Records
2024	The Kid	Self-released
