= Red Fang =

American stoner rock band

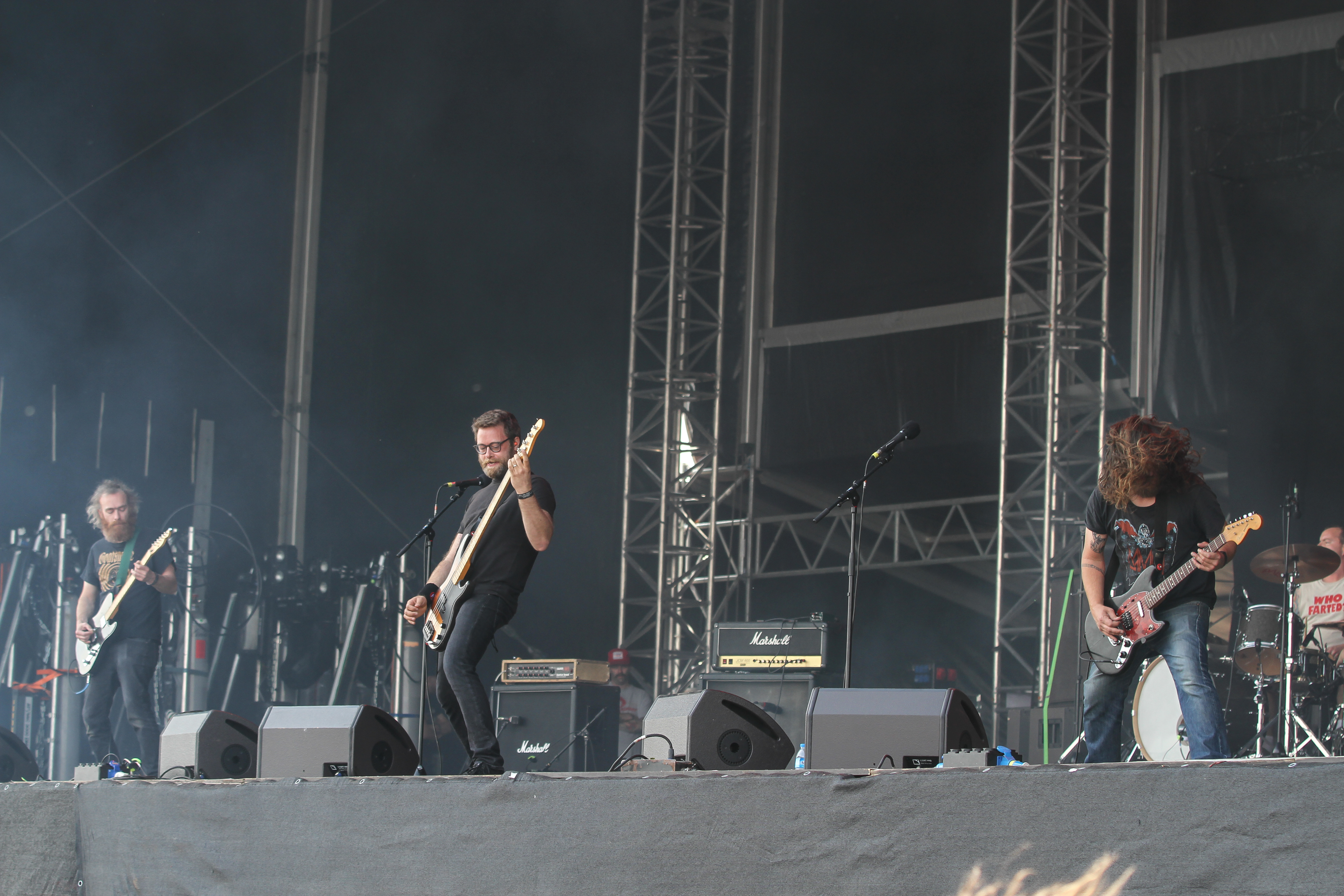
- Red Fang performing in 2013

Background information
- Origin: Portland, Oregon, United States
- Genres: Stoner rock, sludge metal
- Years active: 2005–present
- Labels: Relapse, Sargent House
- Members: Bryan Giles; Aaron Beam; David Sullivan; John Sherman
- Website: www.redfang.net

Red Fang is an American rock band from Portland, Oregon, formed in 2005. It is composed of guitarist and vocalist Bryan Giles, bassist and vocalist Aaron Beam, guitarist David Sullivan and drummer John Sherman. The band has released five albums: Red Fang (2009), Murder the Mountains (2011), Whales and Leeches (2013), Only Ghosts (2016) and Arrows (2021).

== History ==
Red Fang self-released a "Tour" EP in 2007, followed by a second one known as the Tour EP 2 in 2008 on Wantage USA Records in Montana. These two EPs supplied material for Red Fang's first full-length album titled Red Fang, also under Wantage USA. A third Tour EP was self-released in 2010. The band followed this with the album Murder the Mountains through Relapse Records in 2011, produced by Chris Funk. Red Fang also appeared on 2011's Metalliance tour alongside the bands Crowbar and Helmet; the same year, Red Fang opened the Jägermeister stage on 2011's edition of the annual Rockstar Energy Drink Mayhem Festival which also featured headliners Megadeth, Godsmack, and Disturbed.

On September 12, 2011, Red Fang was announced as one of the openers (the other being the Dillinger Escape Plan) for Mastodon's 2011 and 2012 tours in the United States and Europe. Later in 2012, Red Fang embarked on a European headlining tour with Black Tusk, performing for the first time in various countries including Russia, Ukraine, and Greece.

In February 2013, Red Fang traveled to Australia to play the Australian Soundwave Festival and also performed sideshows with stoner rock bands Kyuss Lives! and Orange Goblin.

The band performed on Late Show with David Letterman in January 2014 after its 2013 release "Whales and Leeches" peaked at No. 66 on Billboard's Top 200. The show's musical director Paul Shaffer sat in with Red Fang, playing organ during the band's performance of "Blood Like Cream".

On August 13, 2014, Red Fang was announced as the opening act for a December 2014 North American tour by Swedish metal bands Opeth and In Flames.

In 2016, the music of Red Fang was featured in the pinball machine 'The Pabst Can Crusher' from WhizBang Pinball and Stern Pinball, which is themed after the beer Pabst Blue Ribbon. The band is also depicted on the game's backglass art.

On April 6, 2021, Red Fang announced their fifth album Arrows, which was released on June 4, 2021. A headlining tour was announced in support of the new album, however before the tour could take off the band announced its cancellation due to the health concerns regarding the Delta variant of the COVID-19 pandemic.

== Members ==
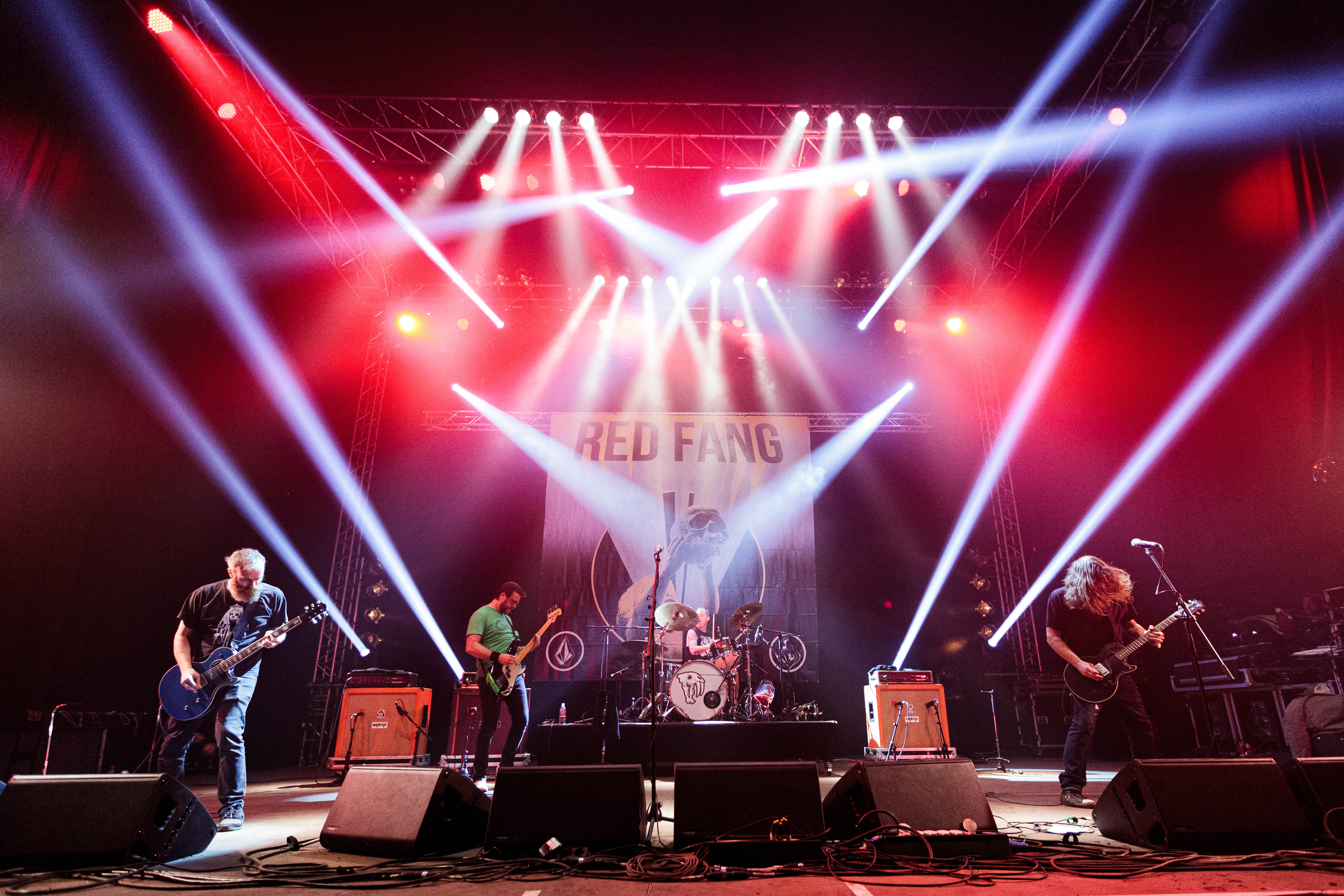
Red Fang at Wacken Open Air 2016

- Bryan Giles – guitar, vocals
- Aaron Beam – bass guitar, vocals
- David Sullivan – lead guitar
- John Sherman – drums

== Discography ==
Studio albums

- Red Fang (Sargent House, 2009)
- Murder the Mountains (Relapse Records, 2011) #25 US Top Heatseekers
- Whales and Leeches (Relapse Records, 2013) #66 US Billboard 200
- Only Ghosts (Relapse Records, 2016) #143 US Billboard 200
- Arrows (Relapse Records, 2021)

EPs & splits

- Tour EP (self-released, bird silhouette artwork, 2007)
- Tour EP 2 (Wantage USA, sabertooth skull artwork on black background, 2008)
- Malverde/Favorite Son split w/ Tweak Bird (Volcom Entertainment, 2008)
- Tour EP 3 (self-released, sabertooth skull artwork on red background, 2010)
- Red Fang/ASG split (Relapse Records, 2013)
- Scion AV Presents Red Fang (2014)
- Teamrock.com presents an Absolute Music Bunker Session with Red Fang (self-released, 2014)

Compilations

- Deep Cuts – compilation of non album tracks, singles, B-Sides, rarities and more (Relapse Records, 2025)

Singles

- "Prehistoric Dog" (Sargent House, 2009)
- "Witness" (self-released, 2009)
- "Wires" (Relapse Records, 2011)
- "Crows in Swine" (Relapse Records, 2012)
- "Blood Like Cream" (Relapse Records, 2013)
- "No Hope" (Relapse Records, 2013)
- "Only Fools Rush In/Why?" (Volcom Entertainment, 2015)
- "Antidote" (Relapse Records, 2019)

Other appearances

- Metal Swim - Adult Swim compilation album (2010)

== Videography ==
The band released music videos for several of their songs, which helped them getting fame in the scene due to their comical nature.

- "Prehistoric Dog" (2010)
- "Wires" (2011) featuring Brian Posehn
- "Hank Is Dead" (2012)
- "Dirt Wizard" (2012)
- "Blood Like Cream" (2013) featuring Fred Armisen
- "The Meadows" (2014)
- "Crows in Swine" (2014)
- "Shadows" (2016)
- "Cut It Short" (2017)
- "Not For You" (2017)
- "Listen to the Sirens" (2018) Tubeway Army cover.
- "Antidote" (2019)
- "Arrows" (2021)
- "Why" (2021)
- "Rabbits in Hives" (2021)

The band also has a cameo in Iron Reagan's 2014 music video for their song "Miserable Failure".
