= Jack White discography =

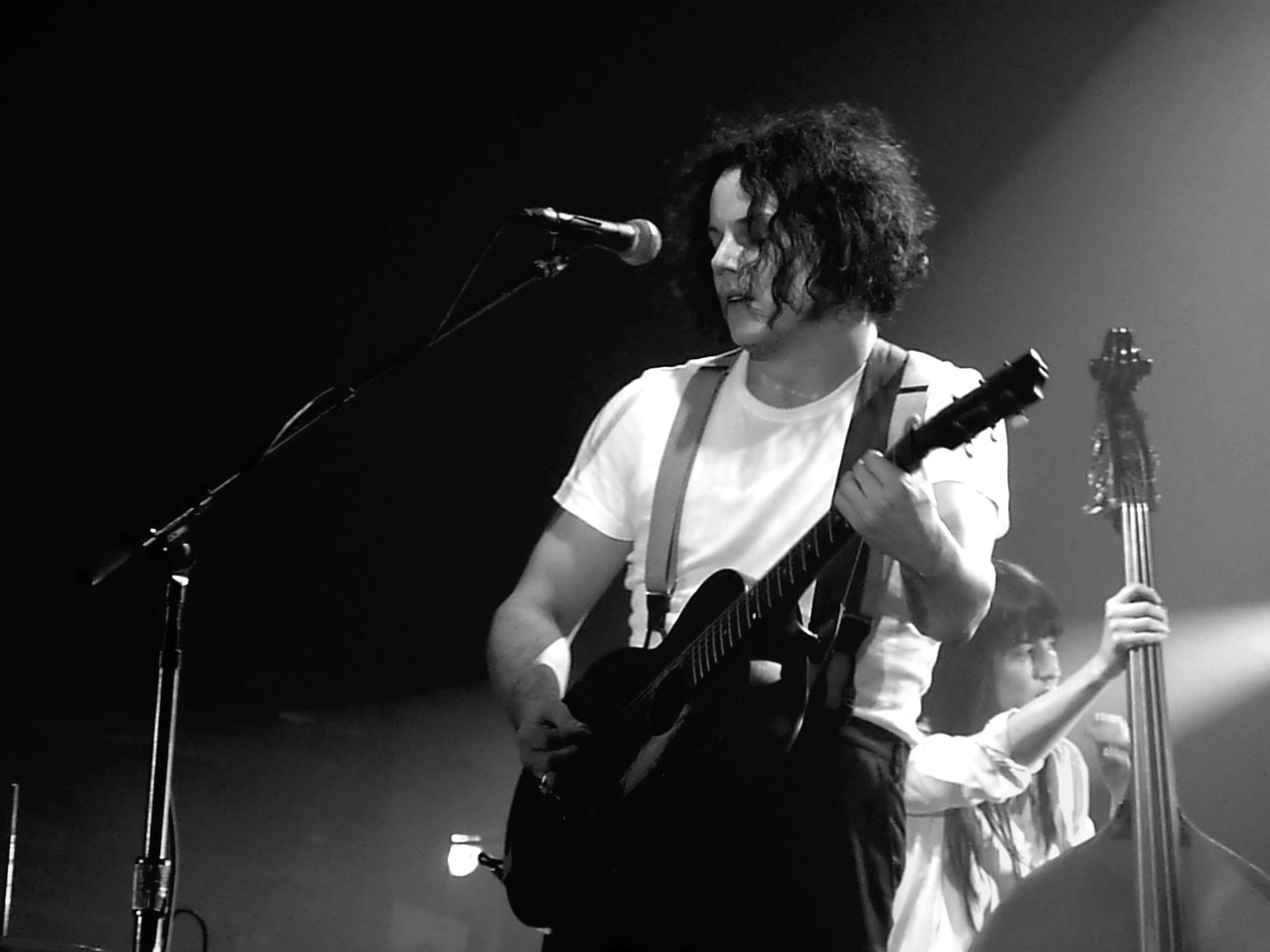
- White performing live in 2012
- Studio albums: 7
- Live albums: 6
- Compilation albums: 1
- Singles: 20

American singer Jack White has released seven studio albums, six live albums, one compilation album, and 20 singles. Prior to releasing solo records, White recorded albums with several bands, including the White Stripes, the Raconteurs, and the Dead Weather. Throughout his career, he has also produced the works of many other artists and made guest appearances on albums.

== Albums ==
=== Studio albums ===
Title	Album details	Peak chart positions										Certifications
Title	Album details	US	AUS	AUT	BEL (FL)	CAN	FRA	GER	NLD	SWI	UK	Certifications
Blunderbuss	Released: April 23, 2012; Label: Third Man, XL, Columbia; Formats: CD, LP, digital download	1	2	3	1	1	5	3	4	1	1	RIAA: Gold; ARIA: Gold; BPI: Gold; MC: Platinum
Lazaretto	Released: June 10, 2014; Label: Third Man, XL, Columbia; Formats: CD, LP, download	1	3	6	2	1	9	5	5	2	4	BPI: Silver; MC: Gold
Boarding House Reach	Released: March 23, 2018; Label: Third Man, XL, Columbia; Formats: CD, LP, download	1	11	8	10	1	11	17	10	5	5	
Fear of the Dawn	Released: April 8, 2022; Label: Third Man; Formats: CD, LP, download	4	25	4	12	10	16	6	11	3	3	
Entering Heaven Alive	Released: July 22, 2022; Label: Third Man; Formats: CD, LP, download	9	43	4	12	45	35	4	9	3	4	
No Name	Released: July 19, 2024; Label: Third Man; Formats: CD, LP, download	108	— (Note: No Name did not enter the ARIA Top 100 Albums Chart, but entered the ARIA Top 20 Vinyl Albums chart at number nine.)	14	23	—	66	20	— (Note: No Name did not enter the Dutch Album Top 100, but entered the Dutch Vinyl 33 chart at number seven.)	7	33	
Frozen Charlotte	Released: July 10, 2026; Label: Third Man; Formats: CD, LP, cassette, download	32	17	19	12	—	47	11	27	6	29	
"—" denotes a release that did not chart.

=== Live albums ===
Title	Album details
iTunes Festival: 2012	Released: October 9, 2012; Label: Third Man; Formats: Digital EP
Live at Third Man Records	Released: December 2012; Label: Third Man; Formats: LP
Live from Bonnaroo 2014	Released: December 2014; Label: Third Man; Formats: LP + DVD
Acoustic Tour 2015	Released: June 2016; Label: Third Man; Formats: LP + DVD
Live at Third Man Records – Nashville & Cass Corridor	Released: July 2, 2018; Label: Third Man; Formats: LP
Kneeling at the Anthem D.C.	Released: September 21, 2018; Label: Third Man; Formats: Digital EP
Live at the Masonic Temple	Released: March 22, 2021; Label: Third Man; Formats: LP
Live at Ford Field (with Eminem)	Released: November 27, 2025; Label: Third Man, Shady, Aftermath, Interscope; Formats: Digital EP

=== Compilation albums ===
Title	Album details	Peak chart positions									
Title	Album details	US	AUS	AUT	BEL (FL)	CAN	FRA	GER	NLD	SWI	UK
Acoustic Recordings 1998–2016	Released: September 9, 2016; Label: Third Man, XL; Formats: CD, LP, digital download	8	13	6	7	18	25	11	28	11	12

== Singles ==
=== As lead artist ===
Title	Year	Peak chart positions										Certifications	Album
Title	Year	US	US Rock	BEL (FL)	BEL (WA)	CAN	FRA	GER	JPN	SWI	UK	Certifications	Album
"Portland Oregon" (with Loretta Lynn)	2004	—	—	—	—	—	—	—	—	—	—		Van Lear Rose
"Another Way to Die" (with Alicia Keys)	2008	81	—	10	20	15	98	8	39	4	9	ARIA: Gold	Quantum of Solace: Original Motion Picture Soundtrack
"Fly Farm Blues"	2009	—	—	—	—	—	—	—	—	—	—		Non-album single
"Love Interruption"	2012	— (Note: "Love Interruption" did not enter the Billboard Hot 100, but peaked at number eight on the Bubbling Under Hot 100 chart.)	27	— (Note: "Love Interruption" did not enter the Flemish Ultratop Singles chart, but peaked at number 20 on the Flemish Ultratip chart.)	— (Note: "Love Interruption" did not enter the Wallonie Ultratop Singles chart, but peaked at number 34 on the Wallonie Ultratip chart.)	72	—	—	83	—	126		Blunderbuss
"Sixteen Saltines"	2012	—	30	— (Note: "Sixteen Saltines" did not enter the Flemish Ultratop Singles chart, but peaked at number 16 on the Flemish Ultratip chart.)	— (Note: "Sixteen Saltines" did not enter the Wallonie Ultratop Singles chart, but peaked at number 27 on the Wallonie Ultratip chart.)	93	171	—	58	—	129		Blunderbuss
"Freedom at 21"	2012	—	35	— (Note: "Freedom at 21" did not enter the Flemish Ultratop Singles chart, but peaked at number 27 on the Flemish Ultratip chart.)	—	—	—	—	—	—	— (Note: "Freedom at 21" did not enter the UK Singles Chart, but peaked at number eight on the UK Physical Singles Chart.)		Blunderbuss
"I'm Shakin'"	2012	—	— (Note: "I'm Shakin'" did not enter the Hot Rock & Alternative Songs chart, but peaked at number 16 on the Triple A Airplay chart.)	—	—	—	—	—	—	—	— (Note: "I'm Shakin'" did not enter the UK Singles Chart, but peaked at number 24 on the UK Physical Singles Chart.)		Blunderbuss
"High Ball Stepper"	2014	—	28	— (Note: "High Ball Stepper" did not enter the Flemish Ultratop Singles chart, but peaked at number 57 on the Flemish Ultratip chart.)	—	—	199	—	—	—	—		Lazaretto
"Lazaretto"	2014	— (Note: "Lazaretto" did not enter the Billboard Hot 100, but peaked at number eight on the Bubbling Under Hot 100 chart.)	16	— (Note: "Lazaretto" did not enter the Flemish Ultratop Singles chart, but peaked at number 18 on the Flemish Ultratip chart.)	—	98	173	—	97	—	116		Lazaretto
"Just One Drink"	2014	—	29	—	—	—	—	—	—	—	—		Lazaretto
"Would You Fight for My Love?"	2014	—	— (Note: "Would You Fight for My Love?" did not enter the Hot Rock & Alternative Songs chart, but peaked at number 38 on the Alternative Airplay chart.)	—	—	—	—	—	—	—	—		Lazaretto
"That Black Bat Licorice"	2015	—	—	—	—	—	—	—	—	—	—		Lazaretto
"You Are the Sunshine of My Life" (featuring The Muppets)	2016	— (Note: "You Are the Sunshine of My Life" did not enter the Billboard Hot 100, but peaked at number two on the Hot Singles Sales chart.)	—	—	—	—	—	—	—	—	—		Non-album singles
"Battle Cry"	2017	—	—	—	—	—	—	—	—	—	—		Non-album singles
"Connected by Love"	2018	—	27	— (Note: "Connected by Love" did not enter the Flemish Ultratop Singles chart, but charted as an "extra tip" on the Flemish Ultratip Bubbling Under chart.)	—	—	—	—	—	—	— (Note: "Connected by Love" did not enter the UK Singles Chart, but peaked at number four on the UK Physical Singles Chart.)		Boarding House Reach
"Corporation"	2018	—	—	—	—	—	—	—	—	—	—		Boarding House Reach
"Over and Over and Over"	2018	—	33	— (Note: "Over and Over and Over" did not enter the Flemish Ultratop Singles chart, but charted as an "extra tip" on the Flemish Ultratip Bubbling Under chart.)	—	—	—	—	—	—	—		Boarding House Reach
"Ice Station Zebra"	2018	—	—	—	—	—	—	—	—	—	—		Boarding House Reach
"Taking Me Back"	2021	—	27	—	—	—	—	—	—	—	—		Fear of the Dawn
"Love Is Selfish"	2022	—	— (Note: "Love Is Selfish" did not enter the Hot Rock & Alternative Songs chart, but peaked at number 45 on the Rock & Alternative Airplay chart.)	—	—	—	—	—	—	—	—		Entering Heaven Alive
"Hi-De-Ho" (featuring Q-Tip)	2022	—	—	—	—	—	—	—	—	—	—		Fear of the Dawn
"What's the Trick?"	2022	—	— (Note: "What's the Trick?" did not enter the Hot Rock & Alternative Songs chart, but peaked at number 13 on the Rock & Alternative Airplay chart.)	—	—	—	—	—	—	—	—		Fear of the Dawn
"A Tip from You to Me"	2022	—	— (Note: "A Tip from You to Me" did not enter the Hot Rock & Alternative Songs chart, but peaked at number 31 on the Rock & Alternative Airplay chart.)	—	—	—	—	—	—	—	—		Entering Heaven Alive
"If I Die Tomorrow"	2022	—	—	—	—	—	—	—	—	—	—		Entering Heaven Alive
"That's How I'm Feeling"	2024	—	— (Note: "That's How I'm Feeling" did not enter the Hot Rock & Alternative Songs chart, but peaked at number one on the Alternative Airplay chart.)	—	—	—	—	—	—	—	—		No Name
"You Got Me Searching"	2024	—	—	—	—	—	—	—	—	—	—		No Name
"Archbishop Harold Holmes"	2025	—	—	—	—	—	—	—	—	—	—		No Name
“G.O.D. and the Broken Ribs” / “Derecho Demonico”	2026	— (Note: "G.O.D. and the Broken Ribs" did not enter the Billboard Hot 100, but peaked at number 21 on the Digital Song Sales chart.)	— (Note: "G.O.D. and the Broken Ribs" did not enter the Hot Rock & Alternative Songs chart, but peaked at number two on the Rock Digital Song Sales chart.)	—	—	—	—	—	—	—	— (Note: "G.O.D. and the Broken Ribs" did not enter the UK Singles Chart, but peaked at number 26 on the UK Singles Sales Chart.)		Frozen Charlotte
“G.O.D. and the Broken Ribs” / “Derecho Demonico”	2026	—	— (Note: "Derecho Demonico" did not enter the Hot Rock & Alternative Songs chart, but peaked at number four on the Rock Digital Song Sales chart.)	—	—	—	—	—	—	—	—		Frozen Charlotte
"Dollar Bill"	2026	—	—	—	—	—	—	—	—	—	—		Frozen Charlotte
"—" denotes a release that did not chart.

=== As featured artist ===
Title	Year	Peak chart positions				Album
Title	Year	US Rock	BEL (FL) Tip	MEX Eng.	UK Phys.	Album
"Two Against One" (Danger Mouse & Daniele Luppi featuring Jack White)	2011	33	32	34	17	Rome
"—" denotes a release that did not chart.

== Other charted songs ==
Title	Year	Peak chart positions										Certifications	Album
Title	Year	US	US Rock	AUS	CAN	FRA	ICE	POL	SCO	SWE Heat	UK	Certifications	Album
"Love Is Blindness"	2013	—	24	—	—	—	—	—	—	—	—		The Great Gatsby
"Alone in My Home"	2014	—	—	—	—	—	—	19	—	—	—		Lazaretto
"Don't Hurt Yourself" (Beyoncé featuring Jack White)	2016	28	—	93	53	106	—	—	30	1	36	RIAA: Platinum; BPI: Silver	Lemonade
"A Madman from Manhattan"	2022	—	—	—	—	—	38	—	—	—	—		Entering Heaven Alive
"Neighbors Blues"	2026	—	— (Note: "Neighbors Blues" did not enter the Hot Rock & Alternative Songs chart, but peaked at number 39 on the Alternative Airplay chart.)	—	—	—	—	—	—	—	—		Frozen Charlotte
"—" denotes a release that did not chart.

== Production history ==
White has been the main or sole producer on all of his own work, as well as that of other bands, particularly those on his Third Man Records label. This is a list of his production credits of notable acts outside of his solo career.

=== Singles ===
Title	Artist(s)	Year
"Bohemian Grove"/"Atheist Funeral"	Dan Sartain	2009
"C'Mon and Ride"/"After Party"	Transit	2009
"Gastown"/"River Song"	Smoke Fairies	2009
"Fame #9"/"BP Fallon Interview"/"I Believe in Elvis Presley"	BP Fallon	2009
You Know I'm No Good"/"Shakin' All Over"	Wanda Jackson	2010
"What Can I Do"/"Lies"	The Black Belles	2010
"And They Call Me Mad"/"Conan O'Brien Interview"	Conan O'Brien	2010
"Charlene II (I'm Over You)"	The Black Belles and Stephen Colbert	2011
"Leck mich im Arsch"	Insane Clown Posse	2011

=== Albums and EPs ===
Title	Artist	Year
The White Stripes	The White Stripes	1999
De Stijl	The White Stripes	2000
Soledad Brothers	Soledad Brothers	2000
White Blood Cells	The White Stripes	2001
Lack of Communication	The Von Bondies	2001
Do Rabbits Wonder?	Whirlwind Heat	2003
Elephant	The White Stripes	2003
Van Lear Rose	Loretta Lynn	2004
Get Behind Me Satan	The White Stripes	2005
Red and Black EP	The Muldoons	2005
Sewed Soles	The Greenhornes	2005
Broken Boy Soldiers	The Raconteurs	2006
Icky Thump	The White Stripes	2007
Consolers of the Lonely	The Raconteurs	2008
Horehound	The Dead Weather	2009
Sea of Cowards	The Dead Weather	2010
The Ghost Who Walks	Karen Elson	2010
Under Great White Northern Lights	The White Stripes	2010
Third Man Live: Dex Romweber Duo	Dex Romweber Duo	2010
Third Man Live: The Raconteurs	The Raconteurs	2010
Third Man Live: Nobunny	Nobunny	2010
The Black Belles	The Black Belles	2011
The Party Ain't Over	Wanda Jackson	2011
Live at Third Man Records: Jerry Lee Lewis	Jerry Lee Lewis	2011
Bathtub Love Killings	Olivia Jean	2014
Dodge and Burn	The Dead Weather	2015
Help Us Stranger	The Raconteurs	2019
Forever and Then Some	Lillie Mae	2019

== Soundtrack appearances ==
- Cold Mountain (2003) – "Wayfaring Stranger", "Sittin' on Top of the World", "Never Far Away", "Christmas Time Will Soon Be Over", "Great High Mountain"
- Napoleon Dynamite (2004) – "We're Going to Be Friends"
- Quantum of Solace (2008) – "Another Way to Die" (with Alicia Keys)
- Shine a Light (2008) – "Loving Cup" (with The Rolling Stones)
- It Might Get Loud (2009) – "Fly Farm Blues"
- The Great Gatsby (2013) – "Love Is Blindness"
- The Hateful Eight (2015) – "Apple Blossom"
- Music from The American Epic Sessions: Original Motion Picture Soundtrack (2017) – “On The Road Again” (with Nas), “2 Fingers of Whiskey” (with Elton John), “Matrimonial Intentions”, “One Mic” (with Nas), “Mama’s Angel Child”

== Album appearances ==
- Hentch-Forth.Five by The Hentchmen (1998) – Vocals, bass and guitar
- Fire by Electric Six (2003) – Vocals on "Danger! High Voltage" (credited as "John S. O'Leary")
- Here Comes the Fuzz by Mark Ronson (2003) – Guitar and co-writer on "Here Comes the Fuzz"
- If We Can't Trust The Doctors by Blanche (2004) – Guitar on "Who's to Say"
- Van Lear Rose by Loretta Lynn (2004) – Electric and acoustic guitar, organ, piano, percussion, backing vocals, duet vocals on "Portland, Oregon" and co-writer on "Little Red Shoes"
- Guero by Beck (2005) – Bass and co-writer on "Go It Alone"
- The Ghost Who Walks by Karen Elson (2010) – Drums and producer
- Rome by Danger Mouse and Daniele Luppi (2011) – Vocals and co-writer on "The Rose with the Broken Neck", "Two Against One" and "The World"
- The Lost Notebooks of Hank Williams by various artists (2011) – Vocals and producer on "You Know That I Know"
- AHK-toong BAY-bi Covered by various artists (2011) – Vocals, guitar, and producer on "Love Is Blindness"
- Rave On Buddy Holly by various artists (2011) – Drums and producer on "Crying, Waiting, Hoping" by Karen Elson
- The Party Ain't Over by Wanda Jackson (2011)– Guitar, bass, tambourine and producer
- Hubcap Music by Seasick Steve (2013) – Guitar on "The Way I Do"
- Bathtub Love Killings by Olivia Jean (2014) – Guitar, theremin, percussion and producer
- Song Reader by various artists (2014) – Vocals, acoustic and electric guitar and producer on "I'm Down" by himself
- Lemonade by Beyoncé (2016) – Duet vocals, bass and producer on "Don't Hurt Yourself"
- We Got It from Here... Thank You 4 Your Service by A Tribe Called Quest (2016) – Vocals and acoustic guitar on "Solid Wall of Sound", guitar on "Ego" and "The Donald"
- Igor by Tyler, The Creator (2019) – Guitar on "Are We Still Friends?"
