= Lillie Mae =

American country singer (born 1991)

- Born: Lillie Mae Rische; Galena, Illinois, U.S.
- Genres: Americana, country, bluegrass
- Instruments: Guitar, fiddle
- Years active: 2013-present
- Label: Third Man Records
- Formerly of: Jypsi
- Website: www.lilliemaemusic.com

Lillie Mae (born Lillie Mae Rische on June 26, 1991) is an American country and Americana singer, songwriter, fiddle and guitar player based in Nashville, Tennessee.

== Career ==
=== Early career ===
Lillie Mae Rische started playing and performing live at the age of 3. She started playing guitar at age 4 and started playing fiddle at age 7. Lillie Mae and her family toured as a family band for many years. Her father, Forrest Carter, left when she was 11. The family settled in Nashville, Tennessee in 2000. Her family began playing the local honky tonks (Laylas) with her siblings, Frank, Scarlett, Amber-Dawn and McKenna Grace, as Jypsi. Most of the siblings signed with Arista Records in 2007 and had two Top 40 singles on Hot Country Songs the next year "I Don't Love You Like That".

=== Third Man Records and Jack White ===
Mae began doing session work for Third Man Records, which led to her playing fiddle on Jack White's 2012 (Blunderbuss) and 2014 (Lazaretto) tours. She was part of the female band that toured alongside the male band.

In 2013, Lillie Mae appeared in several spots in the filmed concert Another Day, Another Time: Celebrating the Music of Inside Llewyn Davis. She sang and played violin on "Did You Hear John Hurt?" and "We're Going to Be Friends" alongside Jack White.

Mae has appeared on all three of Jack White's solo records, as well as on The Raconteurs' 2019 album Help Us Stranger.

=== Solo career ===
In 2014, Mae released her first solo song titled "Nobody's". In 2015 she released Rain On The Piano.

On June 23, 2017, Lillie Mae released Forever and Then Some on Third Man Records. The album was produced by Jack White and featured contributions from her siblings, Frank and Scarlett and McKenna Grace.

In 2017, she performed in the multi-award-winning documentary The American Epic Sessions. In this musical feature, she played both fiddle and mandolin alongside Jack White, Dominic Davis, and Fats Kaplin as part of the backing band for artists such as Willie Nelson and Merle Haggard, Taj Mahal, Steve Martin and Edie Brickell, and Ana Gabriel. Merle Haggard played her fiddle on the show.

She played fiddle and provided background vocals on Jim Lauderdale's 2018 album Time Flies.

On August 16, 2019, Lillie Mae released her follow up studio album, Other Girls on Third Man Records. It was produced by the Dave Cobb and recorded at Nashville's RCA Studio A.

Lillie Mae has performed as a solo artist on both Conan and The Late Show with Stephen Colbert.

She toured with Robert Plant's Sensational Space Shifters, opening most shows acoustically with her partner Misael Arriaga. Arriaga also plays in Lillie Mae's touring band.

Lillie Mae plays with her siblings still in the family band, (The Risches) and plays downtown Nashville at Layla's whenever she is not touring.

== Discography ==
=== Studio albums ===
Title	Album details	Peak chart positions			Sales
Title	Album details	US Country Sales	US Heat	US Taste	Sales
Rain On the Piano	Release date: 2015; Label: Southern Shift Records	—	—	—	
Forever and Then Some	Release date: April 14, 2017; Label: Third Man Records	45	22	—	
Other Girls	Release date: August 16, 2019; Label: Third Man Records	13	7	13	US: 1,600
"—" denotes releases that did not chart

=== Singles ===
- "Nobody's" (2014, Third Man Records)

Music videos

- Wash Me Clean (2017)
- Over The Hill and Through The Woods (2017)
- You've Got Other Girls for That (2019)
