= Congressional charter =

United States federal statute that establishes a corporation

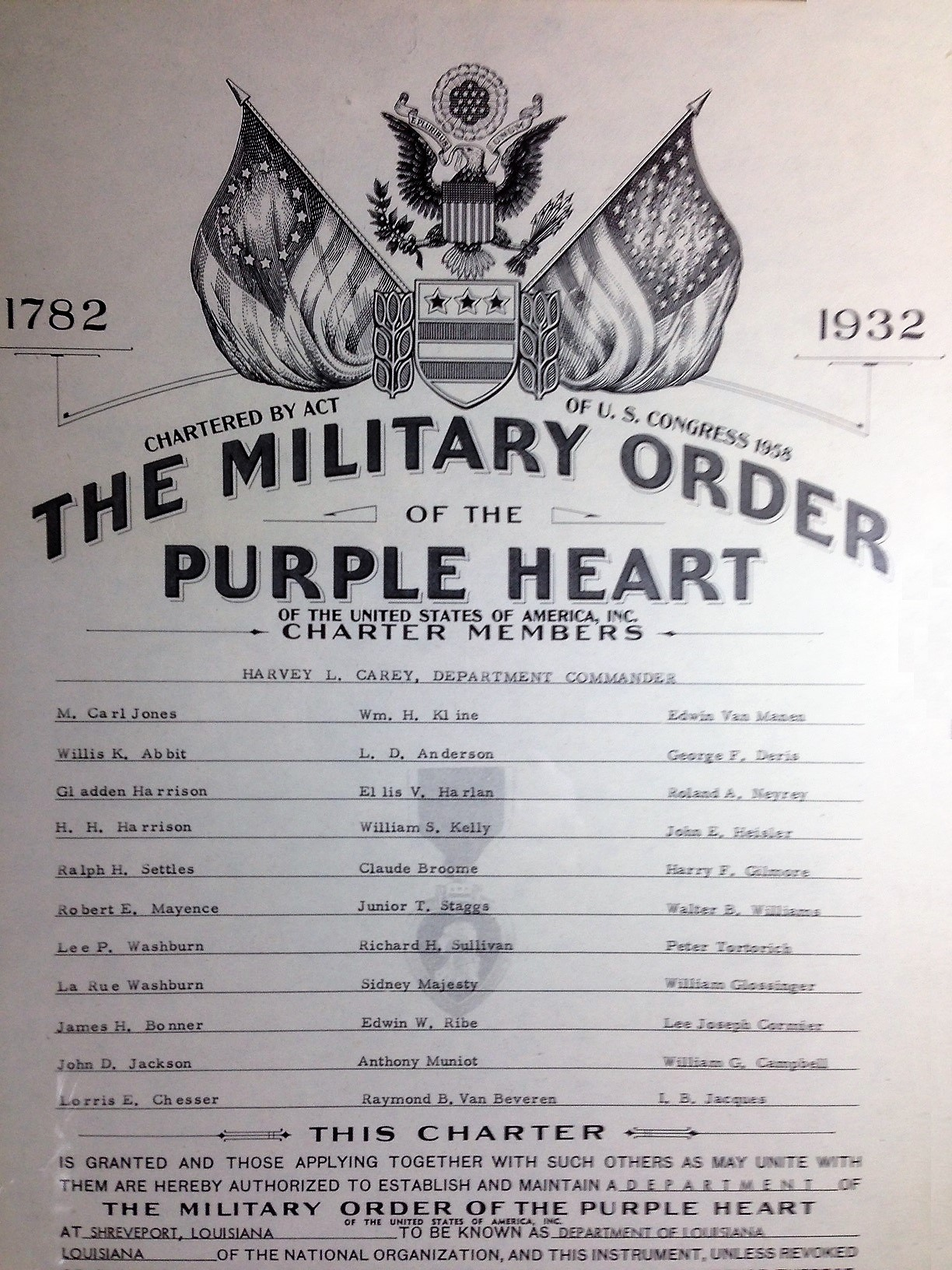
Organization advertising its congressional charter

A congressional charter is a law passed by the United States Congress that states the mission, authority, and activities of an organization. Congress has issued corporate charters since 1791 and the laws that issue them are codified in Title 36 of the United States Code. The first charter issued by Congress was for the First Bank of the United States.

The relationship between Congress and an organization so recognized is largely symbolic, and is intended to lend the organization the legitimacy of being officially sanctioned by the U.S. government. Congress does not oversee or supervise organizations it has so chartered, aside from receiving a yearly financial statement.

== Background ==
Until the District of Columbia was granted the ability to issue corporate charters in the late 1800s, corporations operating in the District required a congressional charter. With few exceptions, most corporations since created by Congress are not federally chartered but are simply created as District of Columbia corporations.

Some charters create corporate entities, akin to being incorporated at the federal level. Examples of such charters are the Federal Reserve Bank, Federal Deposit Insurance Corporation, Civil Air Patrol, Fannie Mae, Freddie Mac, and the Tennessee Valley Authority. Other national-level groups with such charters are the American Chemical Society, American Legion, American Red Cross, Scouting America, the Girl Scouts of the USA, Little League Baseball Inc, the National Academy of Public Administration, the National Academy of Sciences, the National Institute of Building Sciences, the National Ski Patrol, the National FFA Organization, the National Safety Council, National Park Foundation, the Disabled American Veterans, Veterans of Foreign Wars, National Trust for Historic Preservation, the United States Olympic Committee, the National Conference on Citizenship, and NeighborWorks America.

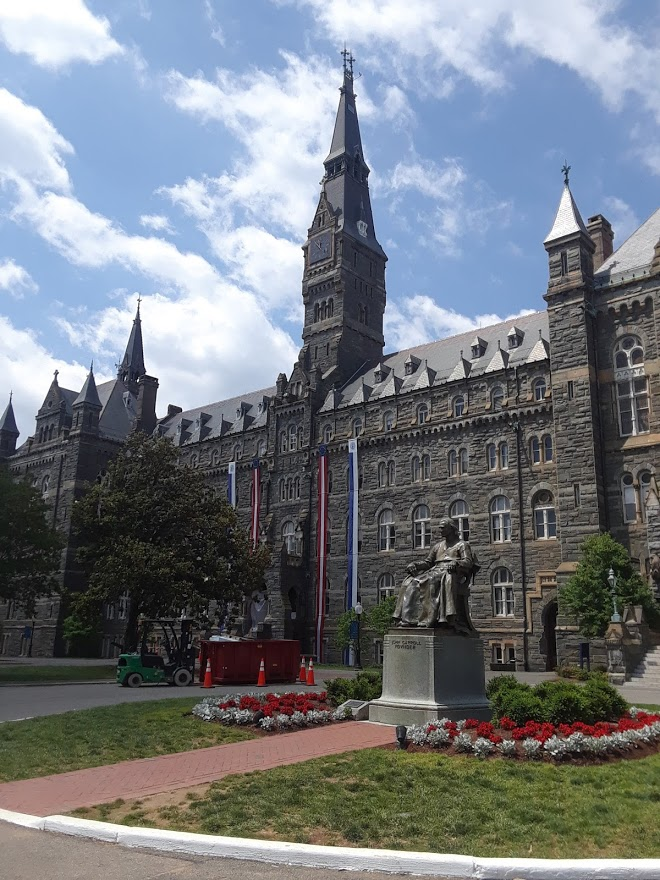
Georgetown University, founded in 1789, became the first federally-chartered institution of higher education in the United States when President James Madison signed the university's charter into law in 1815.

American University, Gallaudet University, Georgetown University, George Washington University, Howard University, and the Institute of American Indian Arts (IAIA) are the only congressionally chartered universities in the United States. Gonzaga College, now Gonzaga College High School, was Congressionally chartered in 1858.

More common is a charter that recognizes a group already incorporated at the state level. These mostly honorific charters tend "to provide an 'official' imprimatur to their activities, and to that extent it may provide them prestige and indirect financial benefit". Groups that fall into this group are usually veterans’ groups, fraternal groups, youth groups or patriotic groups like the USO. Congress has chartered about 100 fraternal or patriotic groups.

== Process ==
Eligibility for a charter is based on a group’s activities, whether they are unique, and whether or not they are in the public interest. If this is the case, a bill to grant a charter is introduced in Congress and must be voted into law.

== Partial discontinuation ==
There had been questions regarding the federal government's power to manage corporations which have received charters. Amid dissatisfaction with the system, the subcommittee of the House Judiciary Committee decided not to consider applications for further charters in 1992. However, Congress issued corporate charters for the Corporation for the Promotion of Rifle Practice and Firearms Safety, the Fleet Reserve Association, and the Air Force Sergeants Association under the National Defense Authorization Acts for the 1996, 1997, and 1998 fiscal years respectively; the National Recording Preservation Foundation under the National Recording Preservation Act of 2000; and the American GI Forum, the Korean War Veterans Association, the Military Officers Association of America, and the National Foundation on Fitness, Sports, and Nutrition in 1998, 2008, 2009, and 2010 respectively under laws passed with the sole purpose of issuing the charters. The granting of a charter does not include congressional oversight.

== See also ==
- Articles of organization
- Certificate of incorporation
- Charter
- Collegium
- Government-sponsored enterprise
- McCulloch v. Maryland (1819)
- Necessary and Proper Clause
- Royal charter
