= Jack Starr (Texas guitarist) =

American musician

Jack Starr was an outsider musician who recorded in 1960s Texas and whose recordings have been released by Norton Records. A comprehensive compilation of his work has since been repressed as the "Born Petrified" LP. Starr recorded the song "Pain (Gimme Sympathy)," which was later covered by the two-piece band The Upholsterers (consisting of Jack White and Brian Muldoon), who released their only single, Makers of High Grade Suites, in 2000.

Spin's Byron Coley called him "unimaginably obscure", and his music "lobe-pummelling" and "ultra-primitive".
