= Rolling Stone charts =

American record charts

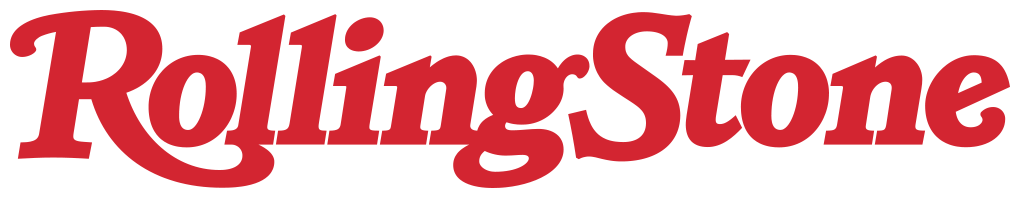
Logo of Rolling Stone magazine

The Rolling Stone charts tabulated the relative weekly popularity of songs and albums in the United States. Chart data was powered by analytics firm Alpha Data (formerly BuzzAngle Music) and results were published on the website of pop culture magazine Rolling Stone, both of which are properties of the United States–based Penske Media Corporation (PMC).

The Rolling Stone charts competed with the Billboard charts, which are powered by Nielsen SoundScan and published by Billboard magazine. The Rolling Stone charts were differentiated by their emphasis in streaming media and daily updates while still publishing a weekly final version on the Monday following the Friday-to-Thursday tracking week. They were announced on May 7, 2019, and were expected to launch on May 13, but were ultimately launched on July 2. The charts were discontinued at the end of October 2021 after the October 21 issue, with Billboard having become a sister PMC publication to Rolling Stone in the last part of 2020, thus making the Rolling Stone charts internally duplicative and superfluous.

== Background ==
Since Billboard began publishing its first ranked record charts in 1940, the Billboard charts have been considered the standard in gauging the popularity of music in the United States. Throughout the 20th century, several competitors came and went, including charts published in Cash Box (1952–96), Record World (1954–82) and Radio & Records (1973–2009). Over time, incomplete distinctions between album sales, album shipments, digital downloads, and streaming media have been sources of criticism regarding the charts' validities.

Rolling Stone first announced it would be launching a group of record charts on May 7, 2019. The scheduled launch date for the project was announced by the magazine as May 13, 2019. It was included in the announcement that the charts would be powered by information supplied by data analytics company Alpha Data, previously known as "BuzzAngle Music" prior to their rebranding on May 13, 2019. Alpha Data is owned by the parent company of Rolling Stone, Penske Media Corporation, which had fully acquired the magazine at the start of 2019. On May 11, it was announced that the public launch would be delayed indefinitely and the project would remain in private beta, citing intentions to "optimize with industry partners" and "fully ensure smoothness" of the project.

The record charts served as a competitor to the Billboard charts, which have been published by New York City–based magazine Billboard since 1958. Additionally, Alpha Data serves as a competitor to Nielsen Media Research, an analytics firm which provide Billboard chart data.

== Methodology ==
The Rolling Stone charts followed a Friday-Thursday tracking week, based on the Eastern Time Zone in the United States and consistent with the industry standard of releasing new music on Fridays since Global Release Day on July 10, 2015. The final weekly charts were published on the Monday following the previous tracking week. (For example, for a tracking week beginning on Friday, January 1 and ending on Thursday, January 7, the final weekly charts would be published on Monday, January 11.)

A song must have been sold for at least $0.49 for that sale to be logged for a given tracking week; units sold for less than the minimum price requirement in the first three months of release would not be considered for weekly charts. A "song unit" was determined by an algorithm that weights a digital song sale as 1 and respectively values 120 subscription-based streams and 360 ad-supported streams as a song-equivalent unit. With regard to album-equivalent units, a song was generally considered to be part of the first album in which it was included, with the exception of the first four weeks in which a song experiences a surge in consumption because of inclusion on a compilation or greatest hits album. For charts where streaming was the only metric for chart positioning, the type of stream was disregarded and weighted equivalent to each other.

An album must have sold for at least $3.75 for that sale to be logged for a given tracking week; units sold for less than the minimum price requirement in the first month of release would not be considered for weekly charts, but would be reflected in its lifetime sales. An "album unit" is determined by an algorithm that weights a digital, CD, and cassette standard-format album sale as 1; a digital and CD deluxe-format album sales as 1.3; a vinyl standard-format album sales as 2; a vinyl deluxe-format album sales as 2.5; and respectively values 10 digital song sales, 1,200 subscription-based streams, and 3,600 ad-supported streams as an album-equivalent unit. An album edition was considered "deluxe" if the bonus content does not exceed the duration of the standard edition, in which case the standard and deluxe editions would chart as a single album. An album edition was considered "super deluxe" if the bonus content exceeds the duration of the standard edition, in which case the super deluxe edition would chart as a separate album from the standard and deluxe versions. Bundled sales (for example, with concert tickets or merchandise) are considered valid so long as the product listing specifically states that the album is included with the purchase; sales are logged upon redemption of a digital download code or fulfillment of a physical order.

== Song charts ==
=== Rolling Stone Top 100 ===
The Rolling Stone Top 100 compiled the 100 most popular songs in the United States. A song's position was determined by streams and purchases, and excludes "passive listening" including radio play. The chart was first issued on July 2, 2019, for the week of June 21–27, 2019.

The first number-one song on the Rolling Stone Top 100 was "Old Town Road" by Lil Nas X on June 27, 2019. The final number-one song was "Easy on Me" by Adele on October 21, 2021.

=== Rolling Stone Trending 25 ===
The Rolling Stone Trending 25 compiled the 25 songs with the greatest growth in the United States. A song's position was determined exclusively by percentage-growth of its streams, and excluded songs that had charted highly on the Top 100 chart.

== Album charts ==
=== Rolling Stone Top 200 ===
The Rolling Stone Top 200 compiled the 200 most popular albums in the United States. An album's position was determined by streams and purchases of the album and songs on it, and excluded "passive listening" including radio play. The chart was first issued on July 2, 2019, for the week of June 21–27, 2019.

The first number-one album on the Rolling Stone Top 200 was Help Us Stranger by the Raconteurs on June 27, 2019. The final number-one album was Certified Lover Boy by Drake on October 21, 2021.

== Artist charts ==
=== Rolling Stone Artists 500 ===
The Rolling Stone Artists 500 compiled the 500 most popular artists in the United States. An artist's position was determined exclusively by streams of their music catalog.

=== Rolling Stone Breakthrough 25 ===
The Rolling Stone Breakthrough 25 compiled the 25 artists with the greatest growth in the United States. An artist's position was determined exclusively by demand of streams, and excluded artists that had charted on the Artists 500 chart.
