= The Upholsterers =

American garage punk band

The Upholsterers were an American garage punk band in 2000, from Detroit, Michigan. The two-piece band was composed of Jack White and Brian Muldoon of The Muldoons. Muldoon provided drums, while White played on guitar and created sounds with a worm gear saw. They were originally called Two Part Resin.

== Beginnings ==
White grew up and lived in Detroit, Michigan. He originally was a drummer, but decided to take up guitar at age nine. White was in various other bands in the mid to late 1990s such as Goober & the Peas, The Go, Two-Star Tabernacle, a brief stint with The Hentchmen, and most prominently The White Stripes.

At the age of 15, White became an upholstering apprentice of Muldoon, a family friend. By 1993, White and Muldoon were jamming in the studio as a two-piece band; White on guitar and Muldoon on drums. This arrangement lasted until 1996. White would go on to open his own shop, Third Man Upholstery, at the age of 21.

The duo continued to collaborate and released two singles. It was originally thought to be a rumor that during White's time as an upholsterer, he would occasionally place albums of his music inside the furniture being worked on. In 2014, Third Man Records announced that two such copies of their second single have been found.

== Releases ==
"Makers of High Grade Suites" (SFTRI 611) was their first single, a 7" record released on the Sympathy for the Record Industry label in 2000. The track listing (with the composer) is:

1. "Apple of My Eye" – Jack White
2. "I Ain't Superstitious" – Willie Dixon
3. "Pain (Gimme Sympathy)" – Jack Starr

The songs were recorded at Third Man Studio and produced by White and Muldoon. Those tracks were then mixed at Ghetto Recorders in Detroit. The record itself came with a variety of inserts, such as a sticker for White's business Third Man Upholstery, his own business cards, a "fabric" sample of sandpaper, a Muldoon Studio business card and a reproduction of an WE Klomp upholstery tag. The single was pressed in a limited quantity and is highly collectible. The single featured in John Peel's Record Box, a collection of the late British DJs favourite records.

The duo released a second single, "Your Furniture Was Always Dead … I Was Just Afraid To Tell You", however only 100 copies were produced and White and Muldoon hid them all in pieces of upholstered furniture. Two of the singles were discovered in 2014.

== After the band ==
White became famous with his other duo, The White Stripes, and later the groups The Raconteurs and The Dead Weather. White received multiple Grammy Awards for his music with The White Stripes, and his collaboration with Loretta Lynn.

Muldoon resides in Detroit. He has taken photographs for The White Stripes' "The Denial Twist" single, which portray Jack White standing over a dead raccoon and Meg White playing music for a raccoon. Muldoon's photo is on the back of the single's sleeve. Muldoon went on to form the family band The Muldoons with his two sons, Shane and Hunter, who were aged 10 and 13 at the time.
