= Another Way to Die =

Theme from the 2008 James Bond film Quantum of Solace

Single by Jack White and Alicia Keys

from the album Quantum of Solace
- Released: September 30, 2008
- Recorded: 2008
- Studio: Sputnik Sound (Nashville); Blackbird (Berry Hill)
- Genre: Alternative rock; symphonic rock
- Length: 4:23
- Label: Third Man; J; XL
- Songwriter: Jack White
- Producer: Jack White

Jack White singles chronology
"Sitting on Top of the World" (2003)	"Another Way to Die" (2008)	"Fly Farm Blues" (2009)

Alicia Keys singles chronology
"Superwoman" (2008)	"Another Way to Die" (2008)	"Empire State of Mind" (2009)

James Bond theme singles chronology
"You Know My Name" (2006)	"Another Way to Die" (2008)	"Skyfall" (2012)

Music video
- "Another Way to Die" on YouTube

"Another Way to Die" is the theme song to the 2008 James Bond film Quantum of Solace, recorded by American musicians Jack White and Alicia Keys. The song was written and produced by White and features White on vocals, guitar, piano and drums and Keys on vocals. It is the first, and to date the only, duet in the Bond film series. It was released as a single from the film's soundtrack in the United States on September 30, 2008 and in Europe on October 20, 2008. A limited edition 7-inch single of 6,000 copies was released in the U.S. through White's label Third Man Records, and in the United Kingdom through XL Recordings.

Roughly the first two minutes of the song were first played on September 13, 2008 on the radio show Siglo 21 on Radio 3 in Spain. The song premiered on British radio on September 18, 2008 on BBC Radio 1's The Jo Whiley Show. Newsbeat described the reaction from listeners who e-mailed their opinions as mixed. A music video was also released for the song, which was nominated for Best Short Form Music Video at the 51st Annual Grammy Awards, with director P. R. Brown. The song was also nominated for Best Song at the 14th Critics' Choice Awards, and won Best Original Song at the 13th Satellite Awards. Commercially, the song reached number one in Finland and became a top-five hit in Austria, Norway, Scotland, and Switzerland.

"Another Way to Die" was released as a downloadable song for the video game Guitar Hero World Tour on November 7, 2008. An instrumental version of the song was also used in a Coca-Cola commercial, as Coca-Cola Zero was used to promote the film; however, White subsequently announced that he had not approved of the song being licensed for this use.

== Background ==
"Another Way to Die"
A 26-second sample of "Another Way to Die". The song has been criticized as being atypical of other James Bond theme songs.

Jack White wrote and produced the song and he plays the guitar, drums, and piano, while Alicia Keys provides vocals, becoming the first duet in James Bond theme history. The pair filmed a video for the song in Toronto on September 6, 2008, whilst Keys was at the 2008 Toronto International Film Festival promoting her film The Secret Life of Bees and White was there with It Might Get Loud, a documentary on the electric guitar. Initial reviews of the song were mixed, with some critics anticipating that the song could grow in popularity the more it was played on radio and performed live. Amy Winehouse and Leona Lewis had previously been rumored as the vocalists for the Bond theme for the film Quantum of Solace. White confirmed in a 2022 interview that Winehouse was originally chosen to record the Quantum of Solace theme, but exited the project due to complications, leading to White and Keys being selected at the last minute. The song is included on the Super Edition of Keys' third studio album, As I Am (2007).

== Music video ==
The music video for the song was released on Yahoo! Video on September 29, 2008, and directed by P. R. Brown. It has since made its way onto YouTube and other video sharing sites. It can also be seen on the DVD of the film Quantum of Solace. It features White singing and playing both guitar and the drums. Keys sings and plays piano in the video. Video effects and CGI are in the background featuring wavy lines and use of dawn and dusk. A shot of Daniel Craig as James Bond appears in the very last shot, which appeared in the theatrical trailer for the film. The video was announced as a nominee for Best Short Form Music Video at the 51st Annual Grammy Awards.

In the opening titles to the theatrical film, the song begins when Bond fires a bullet. He roams the desert aiming his gun in every direction, and slowly the sand dunes he has been patrolling become nude women in silhouette. Aside from the desert theme, there are also visual cues of the night sky, and lines of celestial navigation seen, as well as various handgun silhouettes. The main colors used in the video are black, blue, and orange.

== Chart performance ==
On September 28, 2008, the song entered the UK Singles Chart at number twenty-six on downloads alone, and peaked at nine. Also, it became Keys' first chart-topper in Finland, and charted inside the top ten in Austria, Belgium, Denmark, Germany, Norway, and Switzerland. In Canada it debuted at number fifteen on the Canadian Hot 100 on the issue dated October 18, 2008, based on a large number of downloads.

In the United States it debuted at number eighty-one on the Billboard Hot 100 on the issue dated November 29, 2008, spending one week only on the chart.

In Australia the single made its way into the top forty, peaking at number twenty-nine for the week of December 1, 2008. "Another Way to Die" was the first James Bond theme song to feature on a Triple J Hottest 100 playlist, compiled almost every year since 1989; in 2008 the song was ranked the eighty-seventh most popular.

== Critical reception ==
The song received some positive reviews as a standalone song, but it was subject to poor reception as a Bond theme, with Jude Rogers of The Guardian calling the song "jagged" and "awkward". Criticism focused on how the song does not seem to fit as a James Bond theme. In the 2008 Popjustice Reader's Poll, the song was voted as the second "Worst Single".

== Live performance ==
"Another Way to Die" was included on Keys' set list on her 2010 Freedom Tour. Neither White nor Keys performed the song on television, nor at awards ceremonies.

== Track listing ==
- CD and 7-inch single
1. "Another Way to Die" – 4:23
2. "Another Way to Die" (Instrumental) – 4:23

== Personnel ==
Credits are taken from the record sleeve.

- Alicia Keys – vocals
- Jack White – vocals, drums, bass, guitar, producer, mixing
- Jack Lawrence – baritone guitar, bass guitar
- Laura Matula – piano
- Wayne Jackson – horns
- Jack Hale – horns
- Tom McGinley – horns
- Lindsay Smith-Trostle – cello
- Lyndsay Pruett – violin, five string violin
- Michael Rinne – double bass
- Vance Powell – engineer
- Mark Petaccia – assistant engineer
- Nathan Yarboro – assistant engineer
- Josh Smith – assistant engineer
- Vlado Meller – mastering
- The Third Man – design
- Rob Jones – design

== Charts and certifications ==
=== Weekly charts ===
Chart (2008–09)	Peak position
Australian Singles Chart	29
Austrian Singles Chart	2
Belgian Singles Chart (Flanders)	10
Belgian Singles Chart (Wallonia)	20
Canadian Hot 100	15
Czech Airplay Chart	65
Danish Singles Chart	7
Dutch Tipparade singles	2
Euro Digital Songs (Billboard)	8
European Hot 100 Singles	12
Finnish Singles Chart	1
French Singles Chart	98
German Singles Chart	8
Irish Singles Chart	12
Japan Hot 100	39
Norwegian Singles Chart	4
Portugal Digital Songs (Billboard)	2
Scottish Singles Chart	4
Slovak Airplay Chart	80
Swedish Singles Chart	15
Swiss Singles Chart	4
UK Singles Chart	9
US Billboard Hot 100	81

=== Year-end charts ===
Chart (2008)	Position
Austrian Singles Chart	57
German Singles Chart	78
Swiss Singles Chart	42
UK Singles Chart	83

=== Certifications and sales ===
Region	Certification	Certified units/sales
Australia (ARIA)	Gold	35,000^{‡}
Denmark (IFPI Danmark)	Gold	7,500^{^}
United States Digital downloads	—	318,000
^{^} Shipments figures based on certification alone.^{‡} Sales+streaming figures based on certification alone.

== Cover versions ==
In 2017, actor and musician Robbie Rist recorded "Another Way To Die" with his band, Ballzy Tomorrow, for the multi-artist compilation album, Songs, Bond Songs: The Music Of 007.

== See also ==
- List of number-one singles of 2008 (Finland)
- Outline of James Bond
