= Fly Farm Blues =

Single by Jack White
- Released: August 11, 2009
- Genre: Blues, blues rock, electric blues
- Length: 3:18
- Label: Third Man Records
- Songwriter(s): Jack White
- Producer(s): Jack White

Jack White singles chronology
"Another Way to Die" (2008)	"Fly Farm Blues" (2009)	"Love Interruption" (2012)

"Fly Farm Blues" is a song by rock musician Jack White. The song was written and used for the rock documentary film It Might Get Loud, which featured White, along with Jimmy Page and The Edge. It was released by White's record label Third Man Records and online.

== Composition ==
The song was written by White during the filming of It Might Get Loud, a documentary featuring White, after he and director Davis Guggenheim had discussed that songs nowadays are over-prepared and over-produced. Guggenheim, however, disagreed, and White wrote and recorded "Fly Farm Blues" in ten minutes. The song was used in the soundtrack for It Might Get Loud.

== Release ==
The song was released as an A-side only 7-inch promotional vinyl record by White's label Third Man Records; originally only 300 copies were issued. The song is also available online at the iTunes Store and Spotify.
