= Jack White =

American musician (born 1975)

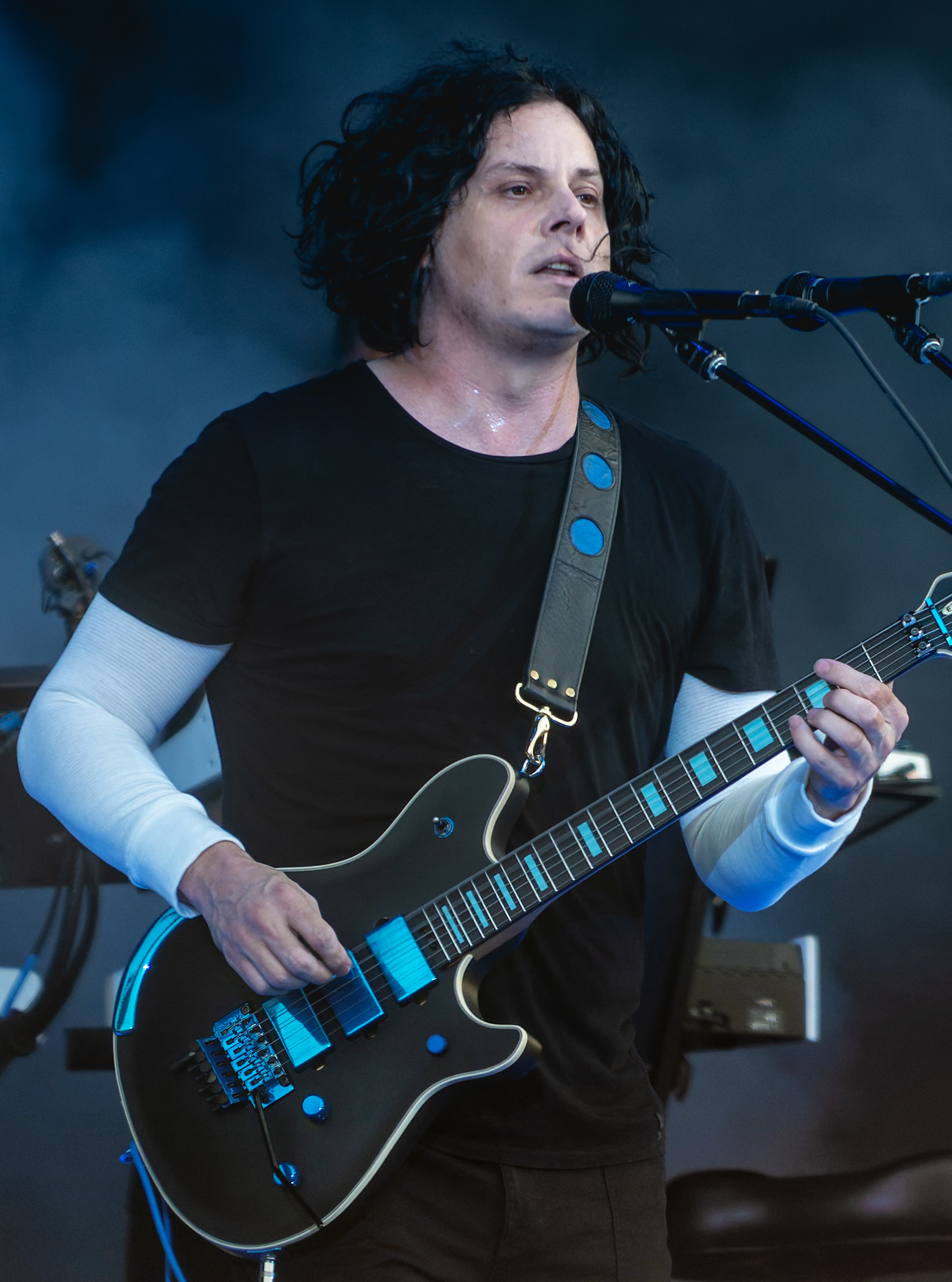
- White performing at Rock Werchter in 2018
- Born: John Anthony Gillis; July 9, 1975 (age 51); Detroit, Michigan, U.S.
- Other names: Jack White III; Johnny Guitar
- Occupations: Musician; singer; songwriter; record producer; businessman; actor
- Years active: 1987–present
- Spouses: Meg White (m. 1996; div. 2000); Karen Elson (m. 2005; div. 2013); Olivia Jean (m. 2022; sep. 2026)
- Children: 2
- Musical career
- Genres: Blues rock; garage rock revival; alternative rock; punk blues; experimental rock
- Instruments: Vocals; guitar; bass guitar; keyboards; drums
- Works: Discography
- Years active: 1990–present
- Labels: Third Man; XL; Columbia
- Member of: The Raconteurs; The Dead Weather
- Formerly of: Goober & the Peas; The Go; Two-Star Tabernacle; The White Stripes; The Upholsterers; The Hentchmen
- Website: jackwhiteiii.com

John Anthony White (né Gillis; born July 9, 1975) is an American musician who was the guitarist and lead vocalist of the rock duo the White Stripes. He was a key artist of the 2000s indie and garage rock movements, noted for his musical techniques, eccentricity, and use of analog technology. After the White Stripes split up in 2011, he found success with his solo career and business ventures.

White began his career moonlighting in several underground Detroit bands as a drummer and guitarist. He met Meg White in the 1990s, and the two founded the White Stripes in 1997. He co-founded his record label and studio Third Man Records in 2001, the same year that the White Stripes earned international fame with their breakthrough album White Blood Cells. This, along with the three subsequent White Stripes albums released throughout the decade, established White as a key artist of the decade's rock revival. In the latter half of the 2000s, he founded the rock groups the Raconteurs and the Dead Weather, recorded the Bond theme "Another Way to Die" with Alicia Keys (the only duet to perform a Bond theme), and collaborated with numerous artists.

White released his debut studio album Blunderbuss (2012) to strong reviews and sales. His second studio album, Lazaretto (2014), broke the record for most first-week vinyl sales since 1991, holding that record until 2021. His following three experimental albums garnered critical and commercial success. His sixth and seventh albums, No Name (2024) and Frozen Charlotte (2026), are noted for their unique release methods and earned general acclaim. Other ventures by White include acting in the films Cold Mountain, Coffee and Cigarettes (both 2003), Walk Hard: The Dewey Cox Story (2007) and Killers of the Flower Moon (2023), joining the Library of Congress' National Recording Preservation Foundation in 2013, and opening an art exhibit in 2026.

Among several accolades, White has won twelve Grammy Awards. Rolling Stone included him on their 2010 and 2023 lists of the greatest guitarists of all time. The New York Times called White "the coolest, weirdest, [and] savviest rock star of our time" in 2012. He was inducted into the Rock and Roll Hall of Fame as a member of the White Stripes in 2025.

== Early life ==
John Anthony Gillis, named after John the Baptist, was born in Detroit, Michigan, on July 9, 1975. He is the youngest of ten children of the late Teresa (née Bandyke; 1930–2026) and Gorman M. Gillis (1927–2006). His mother's family was Polish, while his father was of Scottish heritage by way of Nova Scotia, Canada. He was raised in large part by his siblings, the first of which was 21 years older than him. He equated them to having additional parents.

Gillis was raised in Mexicantown, Southwest Detroit. The Gillises lived in a predominantly Mexican and African-American community and were one of the only families in the neighborhood that did not leave as a result of white flight. He was raised Catholic and both of his parents worked for the Archdiocese of Detroit, his father as a building maintenance superintendent and his mother as a secretary in the cardinal's office. Gillis became an altar boy, which landed him an uncredited role in the 1987 movie The Rosary Murders, filmed mainly at Most Holy Redeemer Church in southwest Detroit. In 1987, Gillis met Pope John Paul II when he visited Detroit and received a blessing.

Gillis's early musical influences were his older brothers, three of whom were in a band together called Catalyst. He learned to play the instruments they abandoned when they moved out of the family home; he began playing the drums in the first grade after finding a kit in the attic. He became so obsessed with learning to play music that he removed the bed from his bedroom to make space for his instruments and resorted to sleeping on foam. Although he grew up in a musical household, Gillis was not actively encouraged to pursue his musical endeavors and assumed his desire to work with other performers was "jealousy" rather than "inspiration." As a child, he was a fan of classical music, but in elementary school, he began listening to the Doors, Pink Floyd, and Led Zeppelin. As a "shorthaired [teenager] with braces", Gillis began listening to the blues and 1960s rock that influenced him in the White Stripes, with Son House and Blind Willie McTell being among his favorite blues guitarists. He has said in interviews that Son House's "Grinnin' in Your Face" is his favorite song of all time. As a drummer, his heroes include Gene Krupa, Stewart Copeland, and Crow Smith from Flat Duo Jets.

In 2005, on 60 Minutes, he told Mike Wallace that his life could have turned out differently. "I'd got accepted to a seminary in Wisconsin, and I was gonna become a priest, but at the last second I thought, 'I'll just go to public school.' I had just gotten a new amplifier in my bedroom, and I didn't think I was allowed to take it with me." At 15, he began a three-year upholstery apprenticeship with a family friend, Brian Muldoon. He credits Muldoon with exposing him to punk music as they worked together in the shop. Gillis had only considered himself a drummer, but Muldoon goaded his young apprentice into forming a band: "He played drums", Gillis thought. "Well, I guess I'll play guitar then." Gillis started learning the guitar to play along to music he enjoyed and have others to perform with. The two recorded an album, Makers of High Grade Suites, as the Upholsterers. (Note: In 2016, Third Man Records announced that two separate individuals had found two records by the Upholsterers that Brian Muldoon had hidden in furniture in 2004, in celebration of having been in business for 25 years.)

He attended Cass Technical High School in Detroit. As a senior in high school, he met Meg White at a coffee shop in either Ferndale or Hamtramck. Together, they frequented the coffee shops, local music venues, and record stores of the area. After a courtship, they married on September 21, 1996. In a reversal of tradition, he legally took her last name. (Note: John Anthony White is his full legal name. He never reverted his surname back to Gillis, legally or personally.)

After completing his apprenticeship, he started a business of his own, Third Man Upholstery. The slogan of his business was "Your Furniture's Not Dead" and the color scheme was yellow and black—including a yellow van, a yellow-and-black uniform, and a yellow clipboard. Although Third Man Upholstery never lacked business, he claims it was unprofitable due to his complacency about money and his business practices that were perceived as unprofessional, including making bills out in crayon and writing poetry inside the furniture. By 1997, he had bought the family home from his parents and was paying the mortgage of his own volition. (Note: Jack and Meg White co-owned and still lived in the home until 2003.) It was in this home that the White Stripes recorded their second album De Stijl.

== Career ==
=== 1994–2004: Beginnings and formation of the White Stripes ===
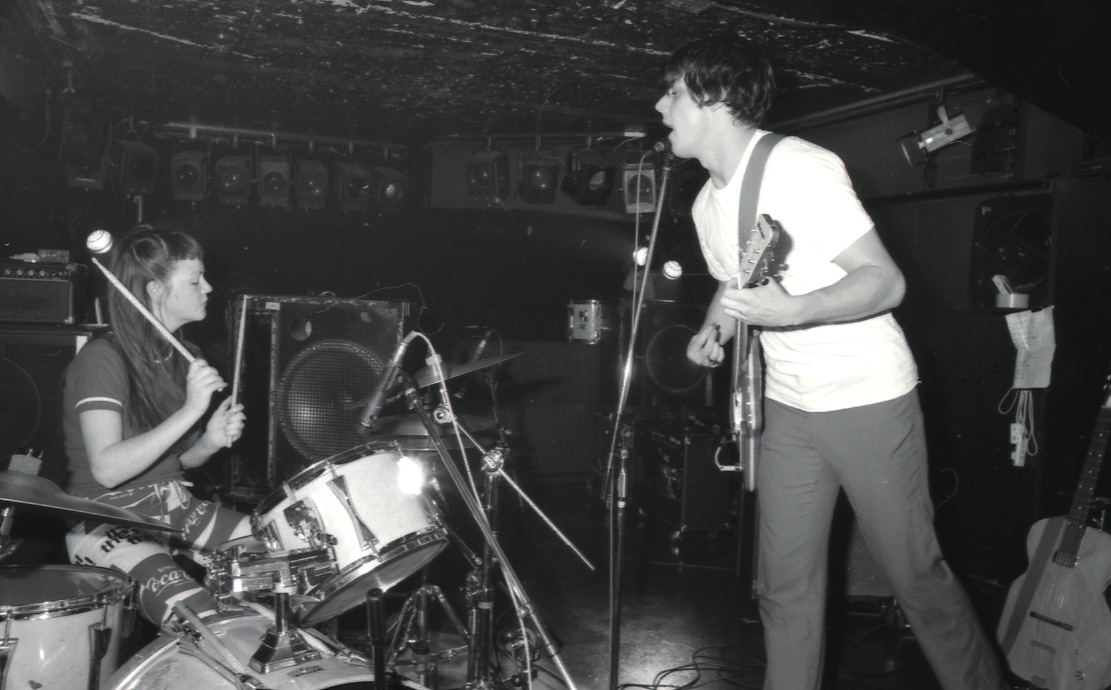
The White Stripes performing at Shinjuku Jam, Tokyo in 2000

At 19 years old, White had landed his first professional gig as the drummer for the Detroit band Goober & the Peas, and was still in that position when the band broke up in 1996. It was in this band that he learned about touring and performing onstage. After the band's split, he settled into working as an upholsterer by day while moonlighting in local bands, as well as performing solo shows. Though a bartender by trade, Meg began to learn to play the drums in 1997, and according to Jack, "When she started to play drums with me, just on a lark, it felt liberating and refreshing." The couple became a band, calling themselves the White Stripes. Two months after forming, on July 14, 1997 (also known as Bastille Day, which White recounted), Jack and Meg performed their first show at the Gold Dollar in Detroit; of the three songs on the setlist, one of them was "Jimmy the Exploder", which would be the intro of their debut album in 1999. Despite being married until 2000, they publicly presented themselves as siblings. They kept to a chromatic theme, dressing only in red, white, and black. They began their career as part of Michigan's underground garage rock music scene. They played along with and opened for more established local bands such as Bantam Rooster, the Dirtbombs, Two-Star Tabernacle, Rocket 455, and the Hentchmen.

White performing in 2003

In 1998, the White Stripes were signed to Italy Records—a small and independent Detroit-based garage punk label—by Dave Buick. The band released its eponymous debut album in 1999, and a year later the album was followed up by the cult classic De Stijl. The album eventually peaked at number 38 on Billboard's Independent Albums chart. In 2001, the band released White Blood Cells. The album's stripped-down garage rock sound drew critical acclaim in the US and beyond, making the White Stripes one of the more acclaimed bands of 2002; it also made the White Stripes forefront figures in the garage band revival of the time. John Peel, an influential DJ and the band's early advocate in the UK, said they were the most exciting thing he had heard since Jimi Hendrix. The New York Times said of White, "beneath the arty facade lies one of the most cagey, darkly original rockers to come along since Kurt Cobain."

White Blood Cells was followed up in 2003, by the commercially and critically successful Elephant. The critic at AllMusic wrote that the album "sounds even more pissed-off, paranoid and stunning than its predecessor ... darker and more difficult than White Blood Cells". The album's first single, "Seven Nation Army", became the band's signature song, reaching number one on the Billboard Modern Rock Tracks chart for three weeks, winning the 2004 Grammy Award for Best Rock Song, and becoming an international sporting and protest anthem. Rumors began to circulate in 2003 that White had collaborated with Electric Six for their song "Danger! High Voltage". He and the Electric Six both denied this, and the vocal work was credited officially to John S O'Leary. Later, Dick Valentine and Cory Martin (Electric Six band members) said White was involved but not paid. Also in 2003, White played guitar and performed backing vocals on the title track of British musician, DJ and producer Mark Ronson's debut album Here Comes the Fuzz featuring Freeway and Nikka Costa on vocals. White worked with Loretta Lynn on her 2004 album Van Lear Rose, which he produced and performed on. The album was a critical and commercial success.

=== 2005–2009: Formation of The Raconteurs and the Dead Weather ===
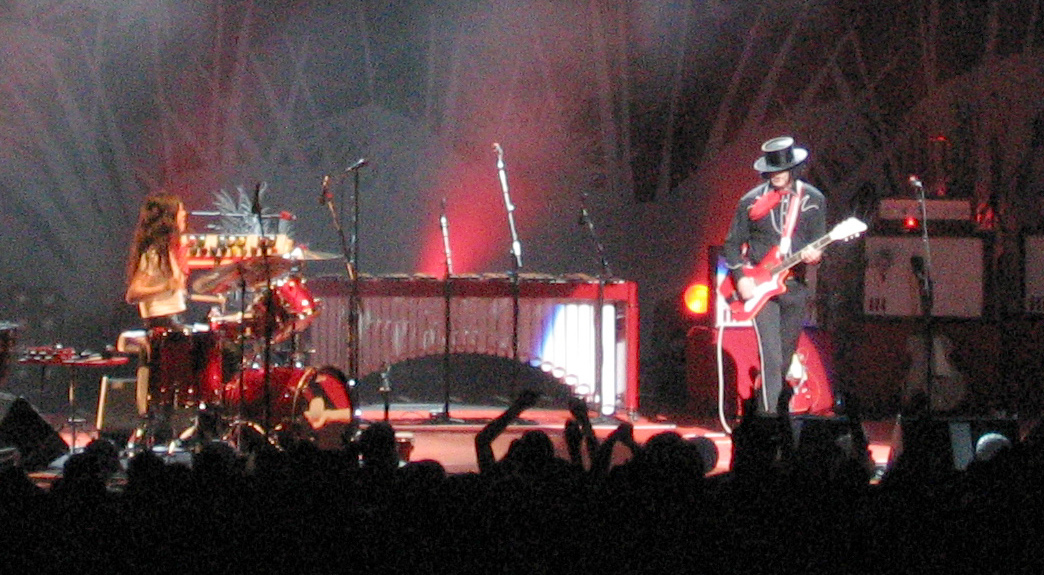
The White Stripes performing in 2005

The White Stripes' fifth album, Get Behind Me Satan, was recorded in White's own home and marked a change in the band's musical direction, with piano-driven melodies and experimentation with marimba and a more rhythm-based guitar playing by White. It was released on June 7, 2005, to critical acclaim. Also in 2005, while collaborating with Brendan Benson—a fellow Michigan native whom White had worked with before—they composed a song called "Steady, as She Goes". This inspired them to create a full band, and they invited Jack Lawrence and Patrick Keeler of the Greenhornes to join them in what would become The Raconteurs. The musicians met in Benson's home studio in Detroit and, for the remainder of the year, they recorded when time allowed. The result was the band's debut album, Broken Boy Soldiers, released in 2006. Reaching the Top Ten charts in both the US and the UK, it was nominated for Best Rock Album at the 2006 Grammy Awards. The lead single, "Steady, As She Goes" was nominated for Best Rock Performance by a Duo or Group with Vocal. The Raconteurs set out on tour to support the album, including eight dates as the opening act for Bob Dylan.

The White Stripes' sixth album, Icky Thump, was released in 2007; unlike their previous low fidelity albums, it was recorded at Blackbird Studio in Nashville, Tennessee. The album was regarded as a return to the band's earlier blues and garage-rock sound. It debuted at number two on the US Billboard 200 chart, and entered the UK Albums Chart at number one, selling over 300,000 vinyl copies in England alone. Of his excitement for vinyl, White explained, "We can't afford to lose the feeling of cracking open a new record and looking at large artwork and having something you can hold in your hands." In support of the album, they launched a Canadian tour, in which they played a gig in every one of the country's provinces and territories. However, later that year, the band announced the cancellation of 18 tour dates due to Meg's struggle with acute anxiety. A few days later, the duo canceled the remainder of their 2007 UK tour dates as well.

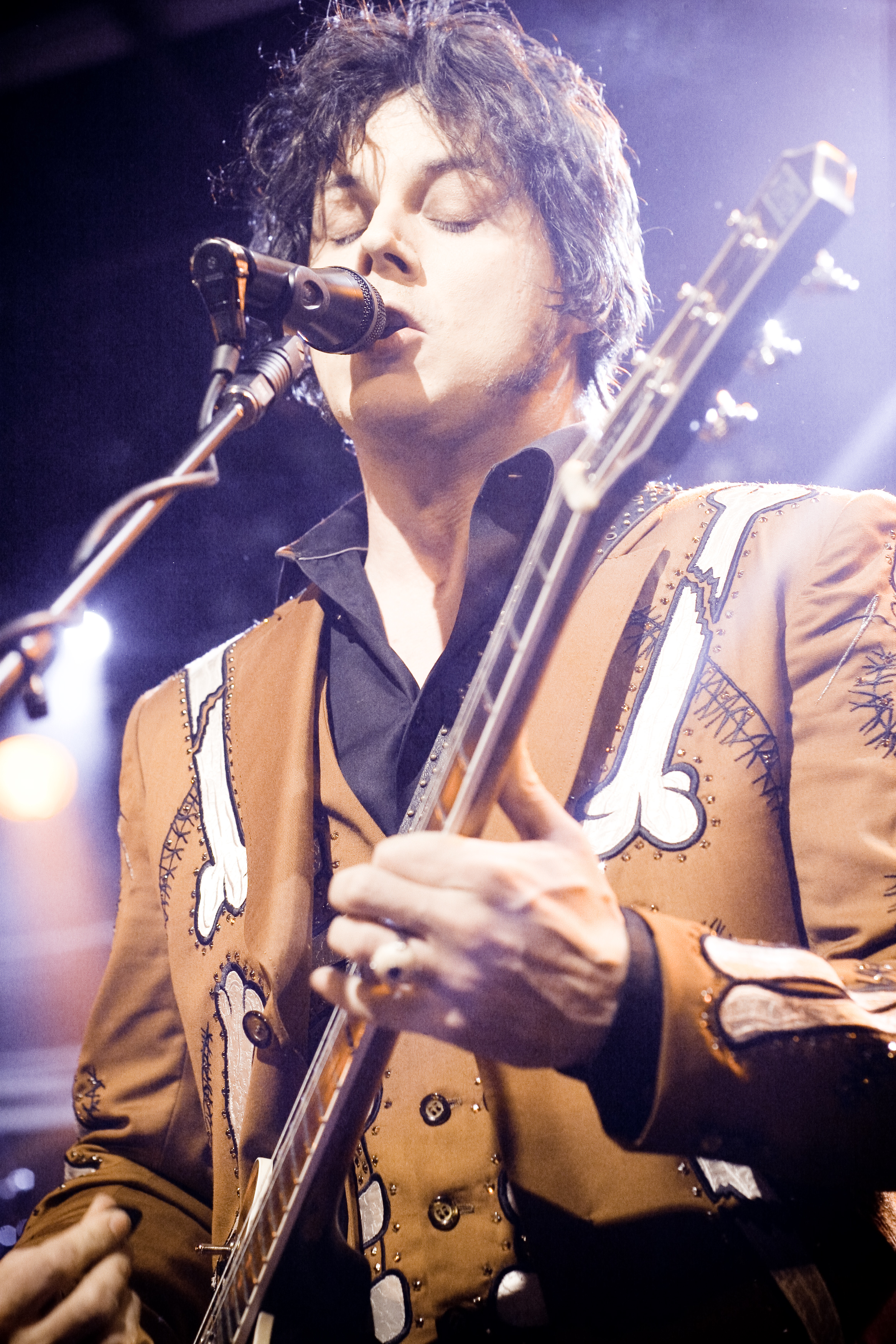
White performing in 2008

In February 2008, White participated in releasing limited-edition Holga cameras stylized around the White Stripes. He returned to work with The Raconteurs, also in 2008, for their second album, Consolers of the Lonely. The album and its first single, "Salute Your Solution", were released simultaneously on March 25, 2008. The album reached number seven on the Billboard 200 chart, and received a Grammy nomination for Best Rock Album. Later on in 2008, White collaborated with Alicia Keys on the song "Another Way to Die", the theme song for the James Bond film Quantum of Solace.

While on tour to promote Consolers of the Lonely, White developed bronchitis and often lost his voice. Alison Mosshart, the frontwoman for the Kills (who was touring with the Raconteurs at the time) would often fill in as his vocal replacement. The chemistry between the two artists led them to collaborate, and in early 2009, White formed a new group called the Dead Weather. Mosshart sang, White played drums and shared vocal duties, Jack Lawrence of the Raconteurs played bass, and the Queens of the Stone Age keyboardist and guitarist Dean Fertita rounded out the four-piece. The group debuted a handful of new tracks on March 11, 2009, in Nashville from their debut album Horehound. It came out on July 13, 2009, in Europe and July 14, 2009, in North America on White's Third Man Records label. White revealed that the White Stripes were planning to release a seventh album by the summer of 2009. On February 20, 2009 (and during the final episode of Late Night with Conan O'Brien), the band made their first live appearance after the cancellation of the Icky Thump tour, and a documentary about their Canadian tour—titled The White Stripes: Under Great White Northern Lights—debuted later that year at the Toronto International Film Festival.

=== 2010–2014: Breakup of the White Stripes and solo debut ===
In October 2009, Mosshart confirmed that the second Dead Weather album was "halfway done", and the first single, "Die by the Drop", was released on March 30, 2010. The new album (again on the Third Man Records label) was titled Sea of Cowards and was released on May 7 of that year in Ireland, on May 10 in the United Kingdom, and on May 11 in the U.S. In 2009, Jack White was featured in It Might Get Loud, a film in which he, Jimmy Page, and the Edge come together to discuss the electric guitar and each artist's different playing methods. White's first solo single, "Fly Farm Blues", was written and recorded in 10 minutes during the filming of the movie that August. The single went on sale as a 7-inch vinyl record from Third Man Records and as a digital single available through iTunes on August 11, 2010. In November 2010, producer Danger Mouse announced that White—along with Norah Jones—had been recruited for his collaboration with Daniele Luppi entitled Rome. White provided vocals to three songs on the album: "The Rose with the Broken Neck", "Two Against One", and "The World".

After almost two years with no new releases, the White Stripes reported on their official website on February 2, 2011, that they were disbanding. White emphasized that it was not due to health issues or artistic differences, "but mostly to preserve what is beautiful and special about the band". White finished and performed the song "You Know That I Know", and it was featured on The Lost Notebooks of Hank Williams, released on October 4, 2011. In that same year, he produced and played on Wanda Jackson's album The Party Ain't Over. To her delight, his studio also released the album on a 7-inch vinyl. White also appeared on AHK-toong BAY-bi Covered, performing a cover of U2's "Love Is Blindness".

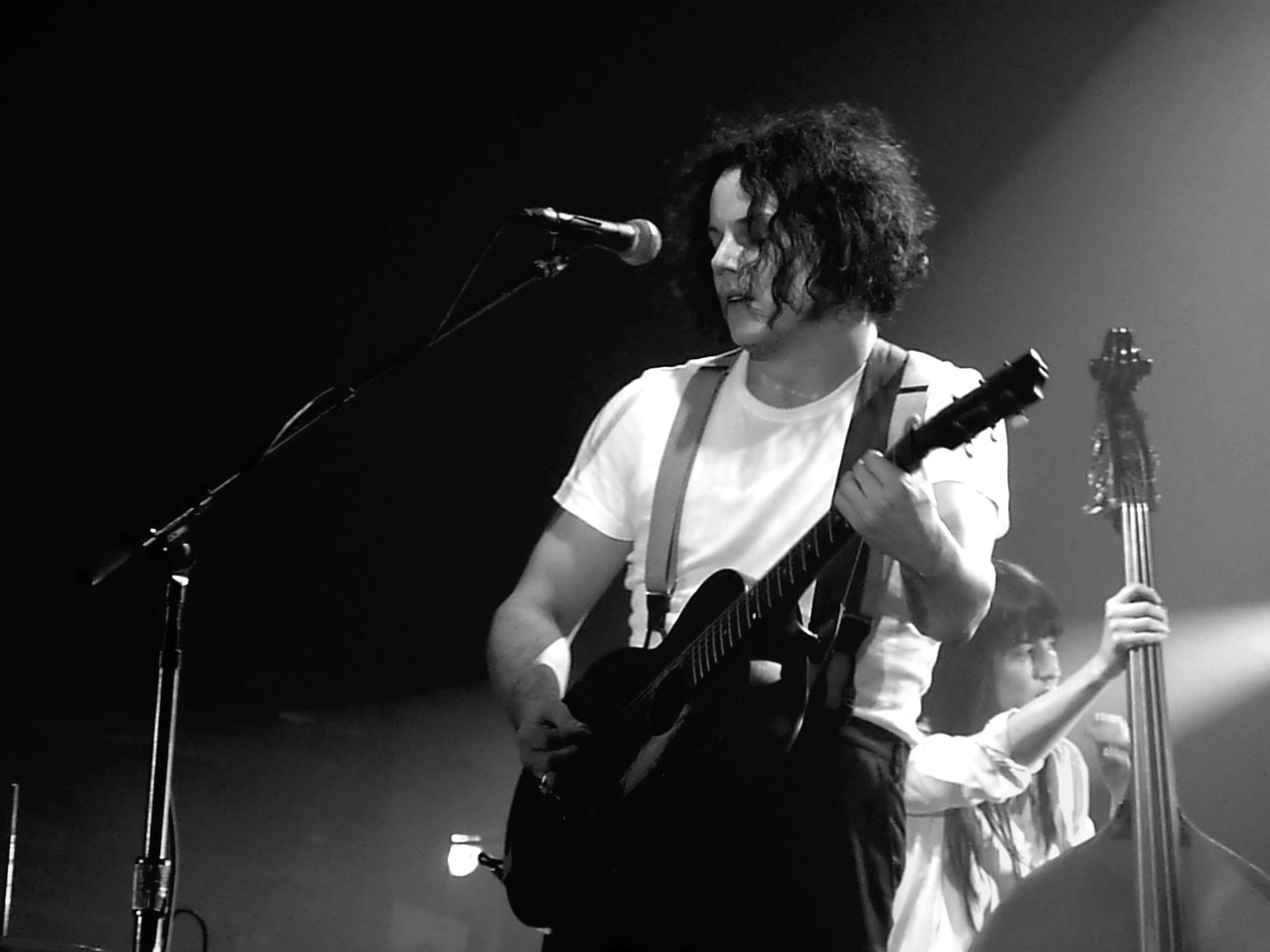
White performing in 2012

On January 30, 2012, White released "Love Interruption" as the first single off his debut, self-produced solo album, Blunderbuss, which was released on April 24, 2012. The album ultimately debuted number one on the Billboard 200 chart, and in support of the album, he appeared on Saturday Night Live as the musical guest and played at select festivals during the summer of 2012, including the Firefly Music Festival, Radio 1's Hackney Weekend, the Sasquatch! Music Festival, the Fuji Rock Festival in Japan (one of the biggest festivals in the world), and Rock Werchter in Belgium. Later in the year, he headlined the Austin City Limits Music Festival. During his tour for the album, White employed two live bands, which he alternated between at random. The first, called the Peacocks, was all-female and consisted of Ruby Amanfu, Carla Azar, Lillie Mae Rische, Maggie Björklund, Brooke Waggoner, and alternating bassists Bryn Davies and Catherine Popper. The other, the Buzzards, was all male and consisted of Daru Jones, Dominic Davis, Fats Kaplin, Ikey Owens, and Cory Younts. White said maintaining two bands was too expensive, and abandoned the practice at the conclusion of the tour. Blunderbuss was ultimately nominated for several Grammys, including Album of the Year, Best Rock Album, and Best Rock Song for "Freedom at 21".

On April 1, 2014, White announced his second solo album, Lazaretto, inspired by plays and poetry he had written as a teen. It was released on June 10, 2014, simultaneously with the first single off the album, "High Ball Stepper". The album debuted at number one on the Billboard 200 chart and, in a personal triumph for White, broke the record for the largest sales week for a vinyl album since SoundScan began tracking sales in 1991. The album was widely praised among critics, and was nominated for three Grammy Awards: Best Alternative Music Album, Best Rock Song and Best Rock Performance (for the song "Lazaretto"). During the supporting tour, he performed the longest show of his career on July 30, 2014, at the Detroit Masonic Temple, and later performed as one of the headliners at the Coachella Festival over two weekends in April 2015.

=== 2015–2023: Further collaborations and experimental period ===
On April 14, 2015, White announced that the festival would be his last electric set, followed by one acoustic show in each of the five U.S. states he had yet to perform in, before taking a prolonged break from live performances. However, he performed on the inaugural episode of the radio show A Prairie Home Companion with the new host, Chris Thile, on October 15, 2016, in support of his compilation album Acoustic Recordings 1998–2016. He co-wrote the song "Don't Hurt Yourself " with Beyoncé on her album Lemonade, and accompanied her on the vocals. The Dead Weather announced their third album, Dodge & Burn, in July 2015 for a worldwide release in September by Third Man Records. Along with four previously released tracks, remixed and remastered, the album features eight new songs.

Ahead of his next effort, White worked in isolation and without a cell phone; he rented an apartment in Nashville, recorded quietly so no one would know what he was working on, and slept on an army cot. He drew inspiration from rap artists of the 1980s and 1990s (as well as A Tribe Called Quest, Kanye West, and Nicki Minaj), and chose his backing musicians from talent that had played in live shows supporting hip-hop artists. On December 12, 2017, he released a four-minute video titled "Servings and Portions from my Boarding House Reach", which featured short sound bites of new music interspersed with white noise.

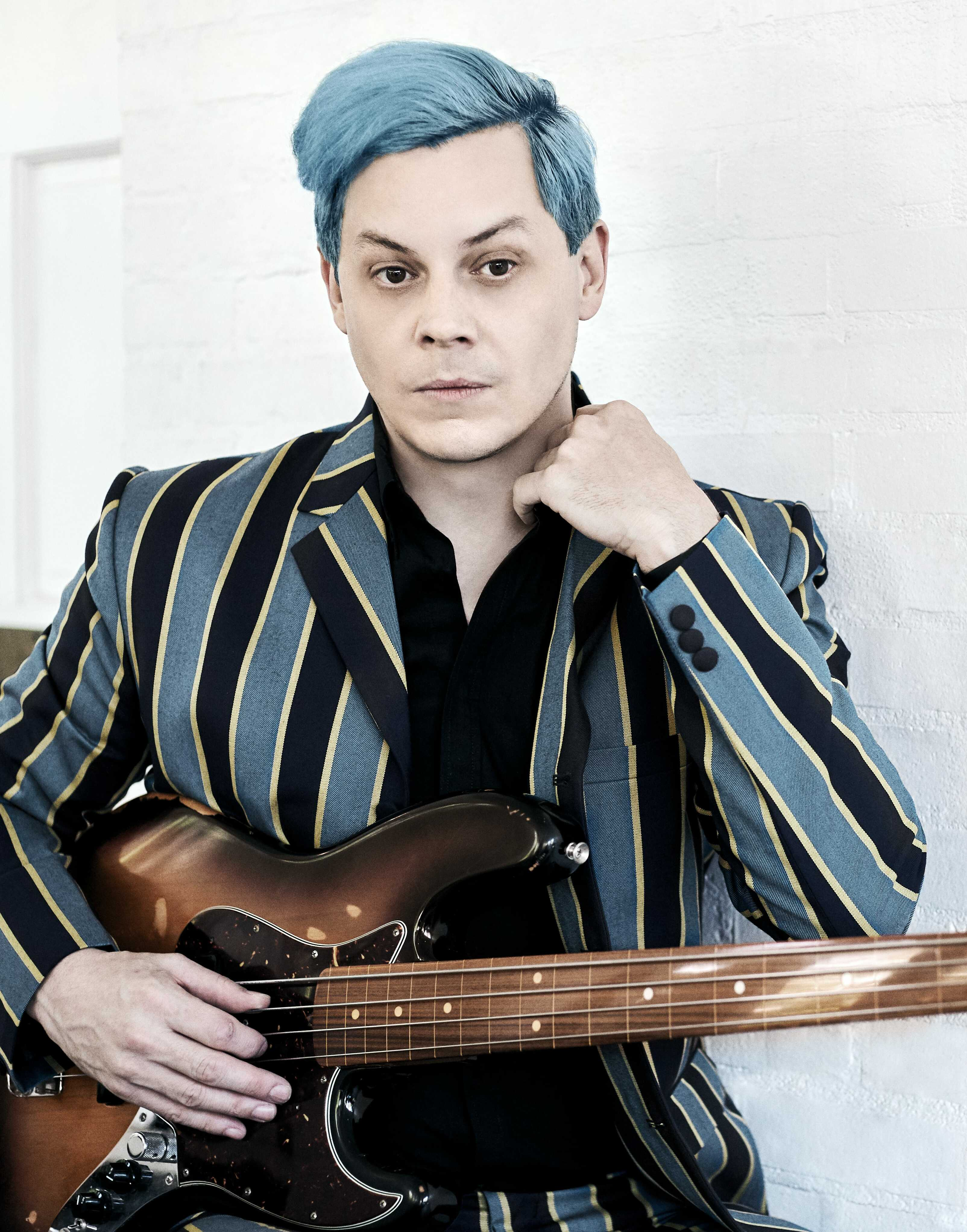
White in 2021

In January 2018, White released "Connected by Love", taken from his third solo album Boarding House Reach, which was released on March 23, 2018. Like its two preceding albums, it landed at number one on the Billboard 200 chart. In promotion of the album, White appeared on The Tonight Show Starring Jimmy Fallon and on Saturday Night Live as the musical guest, playing "Over and Over and Over" and "Connected by Love". White released Jack White: Kneeling at The Anthem D.C., his first concert film as a solo artist, on September 21, 2018, exclusively on Amazon Prime Video. The Raconteurs reunited in 2018 with the release of two singles. They released their third studio album, Help Us Stranger, in 2019. The band went on a hiatus in 2014, though at the time Benson believed that they were split. Critically praised, the album was followed by a US tour.

In October 2021, White released "Taking Me Back"—his first solo single since 2018—which appeared in the video game Call of Duty: Vanguard. In November 2021, White announced that he planned to release two solo albums in 2022: Fear of the Dawn, featuring White's traditional rock sound, on April 8, and Entering Heaven Alive, a folk album, on July 22. White released a video for "Taking Me Back" on November 11, 2021. White released three more singles from Fear of the Dawn: the title track on January 18, 2022, "Hi-De-Ho" on March 3, and "What's the Trick?" on April 7 (the day before the album released). Each of these singles was backed by a track from Entering Heaven Alive, promoting both albums in tandem. Together, the albums were named the dual number one album of the year by Rough Trade UK. In December 2021, White announced the Supply Chain Issues Tour, which went on throughout North America, Europe, and Asia, reaching a total of 103 shows. It kicked off with its first concert on April 8, 2022, in Detroit, Michigan – during which White proposed to his girlfriend Olivia Jean, with the two marrying onstage – and ended on February 24, 2023, in Aspen, Colorado. White performed on Saturday Night Live on February 25, 2023. He played two songs from his Fear of the Dawn album and was presented with a jacket for being a Five-Timer on the show.

=== 2024–present: Critical resurgence ===
On July 19, 2024, White distributed test pressings of his upcoming sixth solo studio album by secretly including copies of it with purchases made at Third Man Records locations. Select tracks from the mysterious new album premiered on the WDET radio station that same day. White later announced the album to be called No Name, which was released on August 2, 2024. It received acclaim from critics, who noted his return to blues, the album's raw nature and the similarity to the sound he championed with the White Stripes. The Detroit Free Press said White's album-release methodology "made a stand for rock mystique". White commenced the “No Name Tour” on July 27, 2024. Shows on the first leg of the tour took place in small, club-like venues and were announced only days before they happened. The first leg of the tour consisted of 43 ticketed shows in the United States, Denmark, Norway, Sweden, South Korea, and the United Kingdom. On November 15, 2024, White announced the second leg of the tour, consisting of 52 higher-ticketed shows in another eight countries, from November 17, 2024, to May 24, 2025. As of December 14, 2024, all but five of White's 2025 tour dates have sold out.

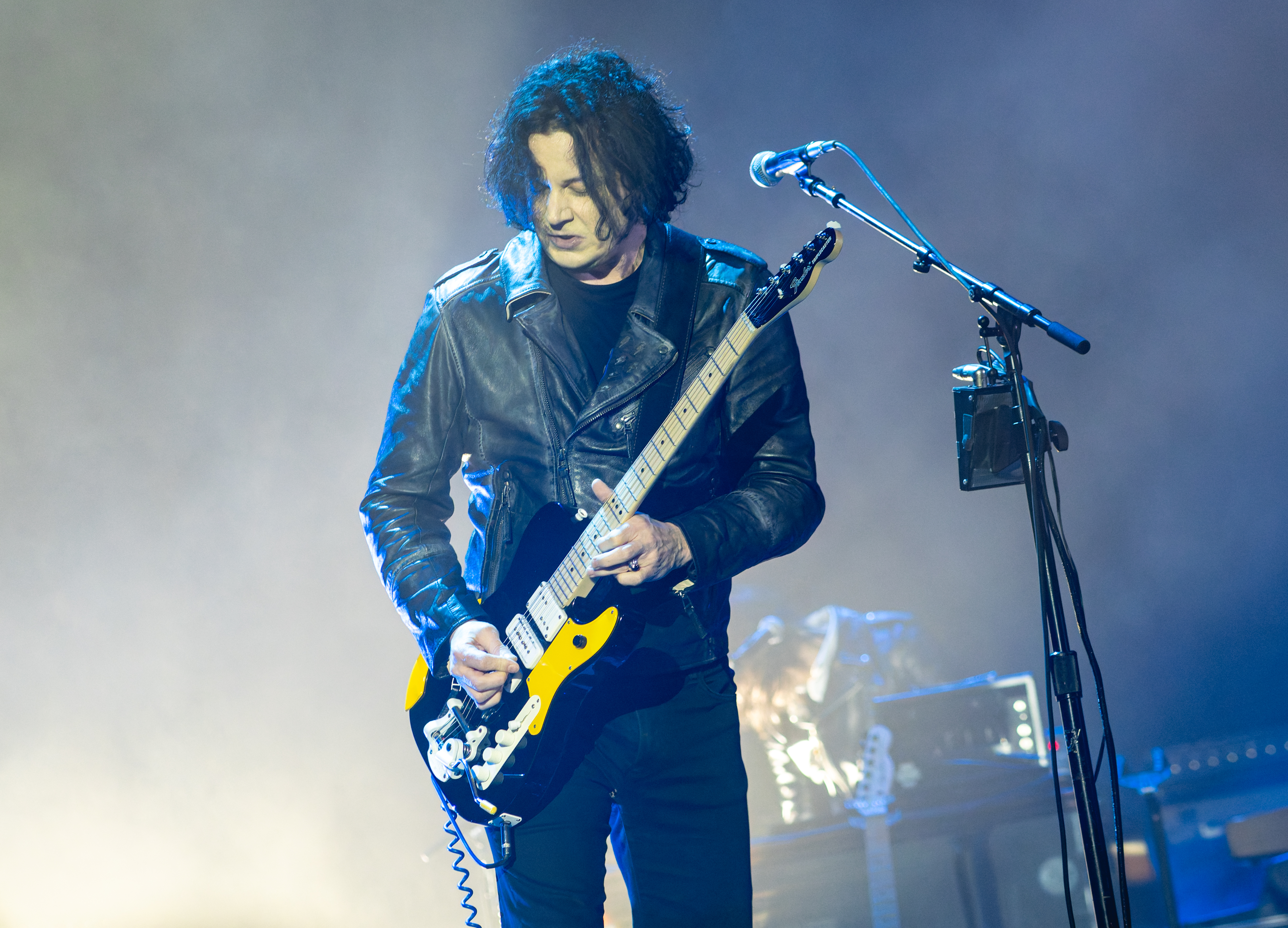
White performing in 2025

In January 2025, the White Stripes were nominated a second time for the Rock and Roll Hall of Fame. In April 2025, during a sold out two-show stint at The Salt Shed in Chicago, Illinois, the venue debuted the "Jack White Vintage Poster Experience," an art exhibit in its adjacent Elston Electric Arcade featuring an array of White-related promotional touring posters from over the years. In November 2025, they were inducted by Iggy Pop into the Rock And Roll Hall of Fame. Jack accepted the award for the band and gave a speech written by him and Meg. He said, "she said she's very sorry she couldn't make it tonight, but she's very grateful for the folks who have supported her throughout all the years, it really means a lot to her tonight." He also read a poem dedicated to her. That same month, at the 86th Thanksgiving Day game, White performed at the Detroit Lions's halftime show with Eminem.

In 2026, White opened his first public art exhibition, "These Thoughts May Disappear", which ran from May to September 2026. In July 2026, he quietly listed his eighth studio album, Frozen Charlotte, on presale for July 10, 2026.

== Other ventures ==
=== Film and television work ===
White has also had a minor acting career. He appeared in the 2003 film Cold Mountain as a character named Georgia and performed five songs for the Cold Mountain soundtrack: "Sittin' on Top of the World", "Wayfaring Stranger", "Never Far Away", "Christmas Time Soon Will Be Over" and "Great High Mountain". The 2003 Jim Jarmusch film Coffee and Cigarettes featured both Jack and Meg in the segment "Jack Shows Meg His Tesla Coil". He also played Elvis Presley in the 2007 satire Walk Hard: The Dewey Cox Story. In 2016, he appeared as a special guest on the season one finale of The Muppets, and sang "You Are the Sunshine of My Life", which he later released on 7-inch vinyl. In June 2017, White appeared in the documentary film The American Epic Sessions, recording on the first electrical sound recording system from the 1920s. His performances of "Matrimonial Intentions", "Mama's Angel Child", "2 Fingers of Whiskey" (with Elton John) and "On the Road Again" and "One Mic" (with Nas) appeared on Music from The American Epic Sessions: Original Motion Picture Soundtrack. He was an executive producer of the film. He had an uncredited role in The Rosary Murders as an altar boy. He also had a minor role in Martin Scorsese's 2023 film Killers of the Flower Moon.

=== Third Man Records ===
White co-founded Third Man Records in 2001 with Ben Swank, formerly of the Ohio-based Soledad Brothers band. However, it was not until after he moved to Nashville that White purchased a space in 2009 to house his label. He explained, "For the longest time I did not want to have my own studio gear, mostly because with the White Stripes I wanted to have the constriction of going into a studio and having a set time of 10 days or two weeks to finish an album, and using whatever gear they happen to have there. After 10 to 15 years of recording like that I felt that it was finally time for me to have my own place to produce music, and have exactly what I want in there: the exact tape machines, the exact microphones, the exact amplifiers that I like, and so on." Using the slogan "Your Turntable's Not Dead", Third Man also presses vinyl records, for the artists on its label, for White's own musical ventures, as well as for third parties for hire.

In March 2015, Third Man joined in the launch of TIDAL, a music streaming service that Jay-Z purchased and co-owns with other major music artists. Later that year, White partnered with the watch manufacturer Shinola to open a retail location in Detroit.

=== Philanthropy ===
White has provided financial support to institutions in his hometown of Detroit. In 2009, White donated almost $170,000 towards the renovation of the baseball diamond in southwest Detroit's Clark Park. The Detroit Masonic Temple was nearly foreclosed on in 2013 after it was revealed that owners owed $142,000 in back taxes. In June 2013, it was revealed that White had footed the entire bill. To thank him for the donation, the temple has decided to rename its second largest theater the Jack White Theater. The National Recording Preservation Foundation received an inaugural gift of $200,000 from White to use toward restoring and preserving deteriorating sound recordings on media such as reel-to-reel tape and old cylinders. The foundation's director, Eric J. Schwartz said the donation demonstrated a "commitment by a really busy songwriter and performer donating both his time on the board, and money to preserve our national song recording heritage". White also serves on the foundation's board.

In July 2016, White joined Nashville's 45- Gender Equity Council. On September 18, 2018, White donated $30,000 to The Outsiders House Museum for its preservation and restoration. On May 3, 2019, Wayne State University of Detroit, Michigan awarded White with an honorary doctor of humane letters degree "for his dedication to Detroit and significant contributions to the arts as one of the most prolific and renowned artists of the past two decades".

=== Fender partnership ===
White released a signature amp with Fender called the Fender Jack White Pano Verb, and a hot-rod Jack White TripleCaster Telecaster and a Jack White TripleSonic Acoustasonic guitar.

== Artistry and public image ==
=== Equipment ===
White owns many instruments and, historically, has tended to use certain ones for specific projects or in certain settings. He has a preference for vintage guitars, many of which are associated with influential blues artists. Much of his equipment is custom-made, for both technical and aesthetic reasons. White is a proficient guitar, bass, mandolin, percussion and piano player. During his career with the White Stripes, White principally used three guitars, though he used others as well. The first was a vintage 1964 red Airline "J. B. Hutto" model originally distributed by Montgomery Ward department store. Though used by several artists, White's attachment to the instrument raised its popularity to the extent that Eastwood Guitars began producing a modified replica around 2000. The 1950s-era Kay Hollowbody was a gift from his brother in return for a favor. It was the same brand of electric guitar made popular by Howlin' Wolf, and White most famously used it on "Seven Nation Army". He began using a 1915 Gibson L-1 acoustic (often called the Robert Johnson model) during the Get Behind Me Satan Tour; in an interview for Gibson, he called the instrument his favorite. He also used a three-pickup Airline Town & Country (later featured in the "Steady As She Goes" music video), a Harmony Rocket, a 1970s-era Crestwood Astral II, and what would become the first of three custom Gretsch Rancher Falcon acoustic guitars. While with the Stripes, any equipment that did not match their red/black/white color scheme was painted red.

On Black Friday in 2013, Third Man Records diversified and launched the Bumble Buzz pedal, an octave fuzz built for Third Man by Vancouver, British Columbia's Union Tube and Transistor. In 2014, the pedal was reviewed by Premier Guitar, and is found in Jack's pedal setup.

While the Raconteurs were still in development, White commissioned luthier Randy Parsons to create what White called the Triple Jet—a custom guitar styled after the Duo Jet double-cutaway guitar. Parsons's first product was painted copper color. However, he decided to create a second version with a completely copper body, which White began to use instead. For the Raconteurs first tour, White also played a Gretsch Anniversary Jr. with a Bigsby vibrato tailpiece and three Filtertron pickups. He later added a custom Gretsch Anniversary Jr. with two cutaways, a lever-activated mute system, a built-in and retractable bullet microphone, and a light-activated theremin next to the Bigsby. White has dubbed this one the "Green Machine", and it is featured in It Might Get Loud. He sometimes played a Gibson J-160E, a Gretsch Duo Jet in Cadillac Green, and a second Gretsch Rancher acoustic guitar. For the Raconteurs' 2008 tour, he had Analog Man plate all of his pedals in copper. In 2020 White completed his Three-Wheel-Motion Low Rider - which is a highly customized Fender Telecaster B-Bender guitar. He has since acquired another Gretsch, a custom white "Billy Bo" Jupiter Thunderbird with a gold double pickguard (as seen in the music video for "Another Way to Die"). White found a 1957 Gretsch G6134 White Penguin in 2007 while on tour in Texas—the same one he used in the music video for "Icky Thump"—which ultimately fit in with the Dead Weather's color scheme. He also uses a black left-handed one since the Dead Weather album Sea of Cowards came out.

White owns three Gretsch Rancher Falcons because he says that its bass tones make it his favorite acoustic to play live. They are collectively referred to as his "girlfriends", as each one has an image of a classic movie star on the back. Claudette Colbert is the brunette he used while with the Stripes, Rita Hayworth is the redhead he acquired with the Raconteurs, and Veronica Lake is the blonde he added in 2010 while with the Dead Weather.

Since 2018, White has been playing EVH Wolfgang guitars, which are Eddie Van Halen's signature model.

White uses numerous effects to create his live sound, most notably a DigiTech Whammy WH-4 to create the rapid modulations in pitch he uses in his solos. White also produces a "fake" bass tone by playing the Kay Hollowbody and JB Hutto Montgomery Airline guitars through a Whammy IV set to one octave down for a very thick, low, rumbling sound, which he uses most notably on the song "Seven Nation Army". He also uses an MXR Micro Amp and custom Electro-Harmonix Big Muff Distortion/Sustainer. In 2005, for the single "Blue Orchid", White employed an Electro-Harmonix Polyphonic Octave Generator (POG), which let him mix in several octave effects into one along with the dry signal. He plugs this setup into a 1970s Fender Twin Reverb "Silverface" and two 100-Watt Sears Silvertone 1485 6×10 amplifiers. He also used a 1960s Fender Twin Reverb "Blackface". On occasion, White also plays other instruments, such as a Black Gibson F-4 mandolin ("Little Ghost"), piano (on most tracks from Get Behind Me Satan, and various others), and an electric piano on such tracks as "The Air Near My Fingers" and "I'm Finding it Harder to be a Gentleman". White also plays percussion instruments such as the marimba (as on "The Nurse"), drums and tambourine. For the White Stripes' 2007 tour, he played a custom-finish Hammond A-100 organ with a Leslie 3300 speaker, which was subsequently loaned to Bob Dylan, and currently resides at Third Man Studios. On the album Broken Boy Soldiers, both he and Benson are credited with playing the album's synths and organ. With the Dead Weather, White plays a custom Ludwig Classic Maple kit in Black Oyster Pearl. Notably, it includes two-snare drums, which White calls "the jazz canon". For the 2009 Full Flash Blank tour, White used a drum head with the Three Brides of Dracula on the front, but in 2010, White employed a new drum head, upon the release of Sea of Cowards, which has an image of The Third Man himself: Harry Lime attempting to escape certain capture in the sewers of Vienna. During the American leg of the 2010 tour, White switched his drum head again featuring a picture of himself in the guise he wore on the cover of Sea of Cowards. This drum head is called Sam Kay by some fans, referring to the insert inside of the 12" LP.

=== Style and technique ===
I love analog because of what it makes you do. Digital recording gives you all this freedom, all these options to change the sounds that you are putting down, and those are for the most part not good choices to have for an artist ... Mechanics are always going to provide inherent little flaws and tiny little specks and hisses that will add to the idea of something beautiful, something romantic. Perfection, making things perfectly in time and perfectly free of extraneous noise, is not something to aspire to! Why would anyone aspire to such a thing?

— Jack White

White has long been a proponent of analog equipment and the associated working methods. Beginning in the fifth grade, he and his childhood friend, Dominic Suchyta, would listen to records in White's attic on weekends and began to record cover songs on an old four-track reel-to-reel tape machine. The White Stripes' first album was largely recorded in the attic of his parents' home. As their fame grew beyond Detroit, the Stripes became known for their affected innocence and stripped-down playing style. In particular, White became distinguished for his nasal vocal delivery and loose, explosive guitar delivery. In an early New York Times concert review from 2001, Ann Powers said that, while White's playing was "ingenious", he "created more challenges by playing an acoustic guitar with paper taped over the hole and a less-than-high-quality solid body electric". His home studio in Nashville contains two rooms ("I want everyone close, focused, feeling like we're in it together.") with two pieces of equipment: a Neve mixing console, and two Studer A800 2-inch 8-track tape recorders. In his introduction in the documentary film, It Might Get Loud, White showcases his minimalist style by constructing a guitar built out of a plank of wood, three nails, a glass Coke bottle, a guitar string, and a pickup. He ends the demonstration by saying, "Who says you need to buy a guitar?" In a 2012 episode of the show, Portlandia, White made a cameo in a sketch spoofing home studio enthusiasts who prefer antique recording equipment.

According to Andy Whitman of Paste Magazine: "Although Jack White is frequently compared to Jimmy Page, he has more Neil Young in him than most critics want to admit. A limited technician, White always managed to do more with less than just about any guitarist in rock. [...] Recapturing the raw blues power and wattage of classic Zeppelin and Stones albums, White’s guitar squawks, squeals [and] soars."

=== Presentation ===
It became hypnotic. This was the minimum amount of staples I could put to hold this fabric down. The number three exemplifies the almost iconic, mysterious perfection that cannot be obtained ... To this day, I still think about it all the time.

— White, on how seeing three staples on an upholstery piece triggered his affinity for the number three.

He has an attachment to the number three, stemming from seeing three staples in the back of a Vladimir Kagan couch he helped to upholster as an apprentice. His business ventures frequently feature "three" in the title and he typically appends "III" to the end of his name. During the White Stripes 2005 tour in the UK, White began referring to himself as "Three Quid"—"quid" being British slang for pound sterling. He maintains an aesthetic that he says challenges whether people will believe he is "real". He frequently color-codes his endeavors, such as the aforementioned Third Man Upholstery and the White Stripes, as well as Third Man Records, which is completely outfitted in yellow, black, red, and blue (including staff uniforms). As a taxidermy enthusiast—that correlates to his work as an upholsterer—he decorates his studio in preserved animals, including a peacock, giraffe, bison and Himalayan goat.

Much has been made of White's "showmanship" and affectations. Since the beginning, critics have debated the "riddle" of White's self-awareness against his claims of authenticity, with people falling on both sides of the issue. Joe Hagan of The New York Times asked in 2001, "Is Mr. White, a 25-year-old former upholsterer from southwest Detroit, concocting this stuff with a wink? Or are the White Stripes simply naïve?" Alexis Petridis, of The Guardian, said that White "makes for an enigmatic figure. Not because he's particularly difficult or guarded, but simply because what he tells you suggests a lifelong penchant for inscrutable behavior." White himself confesses, "Sometimes I think I'm a simple guy, but I think the reality is I'm really complicated, as simple as I wish I was."

White has been called "eccentric". He is known for creating a mythology around his endeavors; examples include his that he and Meg are the two youngest of ten siblings, and that Third Man Records used to be a candy factory. These assertions came into question or were disproven, as when, in 2002, the Detroit Free Press produced copies of both a marriage license and divorce certificate for him and Meg, confirming their history as a married couple. Neither addresses the truth officially (White even went so far as to assert that the marriage certificate could've been fictitious), and White continues to refer to Meg as his sister in interviews, including in the documentary Under Great White Northern Lights, filmed in 2007. In a 2005 interview with Rolling Stone magazine, White alluded to this open secret, implying that it was intended to keep the focus on the music rather than the couple's relationship: "When you see a band that is two pieces, husband and wife, boyfriend and girlfriend, you think, 'Oh, I see ... ' When they're brother and sister, you go, 'Oh, that's interesting.' You care more about the music, not the relationship—whether they're trying to save their relationship by being in a band." As of 2025, White still refers to her as his sister; in his Rock & Roll Hall of Fame speech he made an allusion to their greatest hits album as well as a quote from the film Yankee Doodle Dandy (1942) that he frequently ended their shows with by saying, "my sister thanks you and I thank you."

== Achievements ==
White has enjoyed both critical and commercial success, and is widely credited as one of the key artists in the garage rock revival of the 2000s. For his various collaborations and solo work, White has won regional, national and international awards, including twelve Grammy Awards (from a total of 33 nominations). Three of his solo albums have reached number one on the Billboard charts. Interviewers note the wide breadth of the music styles and eras he draws from for inspiration.

Rolling Stone ranked him number 70 on its 2010 list of "The 100 Greatest Guitarists of All Time". David Fricke's 2011 list ranked him at number 17. Nashville mayor Karl Dean awarded White the title of "Nashville Music City Ambassador" in 2011. In May 2015, the Music City Walk of Fame announced that it would be honoring White (along with Loretta Lynn) with a medallion at its re-opening in Nashville. On February 8, 2017, White was the honoree of the Producers and Engineers Wing of the Recording Academy during the annual Grammy Week celebration for his commitment "to working diligently to ensure that the quality and integrity of recorded music are captured and preserved". In 2025, he and Meg White were inducted into the Rock and Roll Hall of Fame.

== Personal life ==
White is protective of his privacy and gives few details of his family life, even going as far as to disseminate false information. He states that he does not consider his personal life relevant to his art, saying "It's the same thing as asking Michelangelo, 'What kind of shoes do you wear?' ... In the end, it doesn't really matter ... the only thing that's going to be left is our records and photos."

His collection of ephemera includes Lead Belly's New York City arrest record, James Brown's Georgia driver's license from the 1980s, and Action Comics 1 featuring the first appearance of Superman from June 1938. For $300,000 in January 2015, an online bidder won an auction for Elvis Presley's first recording ever—an acetate of the two cover songs "My Happiness" and "That's When Your Heartaches Begin". In its edition of March 6, 2015, Billboard magazine announced the buyer had been White.

=== Relationships ===
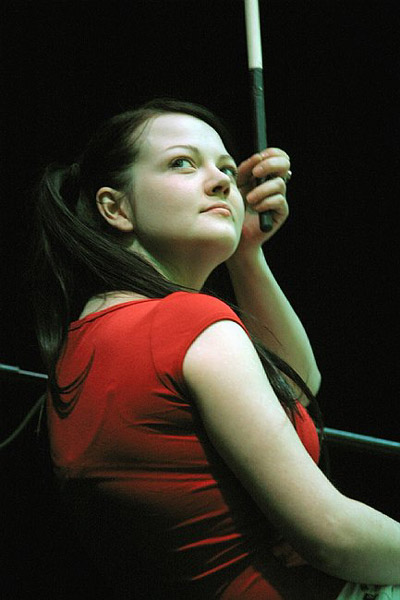
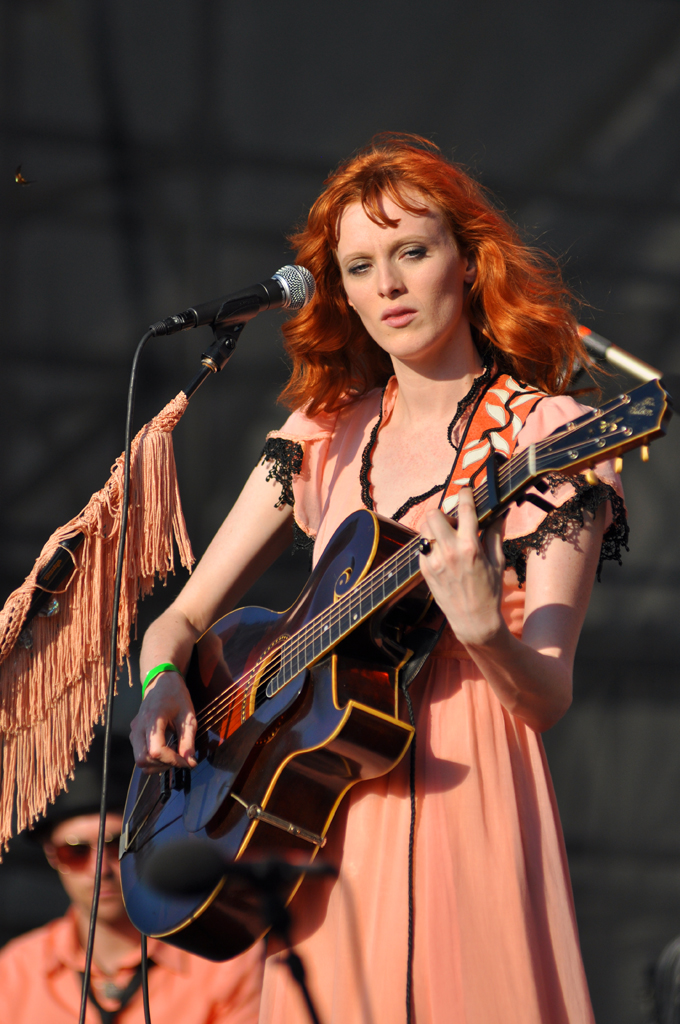
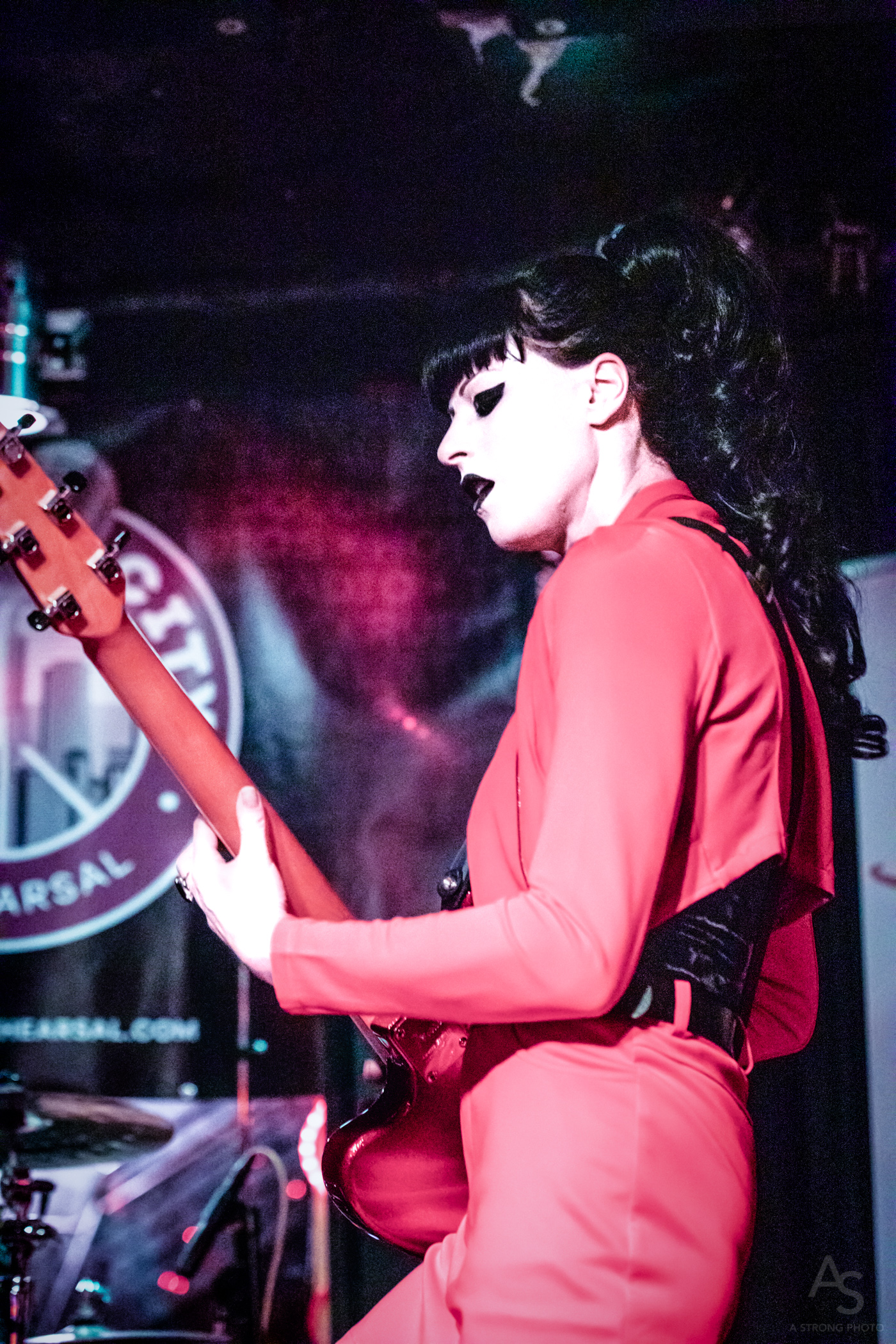
White was married to his White Stripes bandmate Meg White (left) from 1996 to 2000, and to Karen Elson (middle) from 2005 to 2013. He married Olivia Jean (right) in 2022.

From 1996 to 2000, White was married to bandmate Meg White.

In 2003, White was in a relationship with actress Renée Zellweger, after they met during the filming of Cold Mountain. From 2005 to 2013, White was married to model and singer Karen Elson. They met when she starred in the White Stripes' music video for "Blue Orchid" and eloped three weeks later in Manaus, Brazil on the morning of The White Stripes concert in the city, during which he dedicated "(I'll Be with You) In Apple Blossom Time" by Albert Von Tilzer to his bride. Meg White, who urged Jack to marry her, was the maid of honor at their wedding. Later that summer, they also had a legal ceremony (Note: Their marriage that occurred in Brazil was not recognized in the United States.) in Nashville at the Ryman Auditorium of the Grand Ole Opry from the suggestion of a hired pastor at the courthouse. White and Elson have two children together.

In 2009, White met American musician Olivia Jean at a Dead Weather concert. They married in 2022, live at a concert where White proposed to Jean; she filed for divorce in 2026.

=== Politics ===
In October 2016, Republican presidential candidate Donald Trump used the White Stripes song Seven Nation Army in video campaign materials. The band announced via social media "they have nothing whatsoever to do with this video" and were "disgusted by this association", further saying it was an illegal use of their song. The band also began selling shirts reading "Icky Trump"—a play on the White Stripes song "Icky Thump"—through the Third Man Records website.

In 2020, White publicly endorsed Senator Bernie Sanders for the 2020 Democratic Party presidential primaries and performed a six-song set at a Sanders event at Cass Technical High School on October 27, 2019. At the rally, White stated he believes "Sanders is telling the truth, and I really do trust him". He was drawn in by Sanders' view that the Electoral College should be abolished, also stating at the rally that "I have this silly notion that the person who gets the most votes should be elected" and "[the Electoral College] is the reason we're in the mess we're in now".

On November 20, 2022, White wrote a note to Elon Musk explaining his reason for leaving the Twitter platform. White stated: "So you gave Trump his Twitter platform back. Absolutely disgusting, Elon. That is officially an asshole move".

In August 2024, White threatened to sue the Donald Trump 2024 presidential campaign after "Seven Nation Army" was once again used without permission, calling Trump and the campaign staff "fascists". He and Meg reunited to file a copyright infringement lawsuit in September 2024, which was later dropped in November 2024.

In August 2025, White allowed California Governor Gavin Newsom to use "Seven Nation Army" on an Instagram post highlighting his efforts to counter mid-decade redistricting efforts by Republicans in Texas, Florida, Indiana, Ohio, and Missouri. He commented, "Fans of this song and also democracy, notice that I'm ok with this track being used in this manner. Not so much when Trump and his gestapo try to use one of my songs. Keep hitting him back Gavin!"

=== Incidents ===
On December 13, 2003, White was involved in a physical altercation with Jason Stollsteimer, lead singer of the Von Bondies, at the Magic Stick, a Detroit club. Stollsteimer was treated and released from a local hospital. White was charged with misdemeanor aggravated assault. He pleaded guilty to the lesser charge of assault and battery, was fined $750 (including court costs), and was sentenced to take anger management classes.

White has repeatedly referred to conflicts that erupted between him and fellow artists in Detroit's underground music scene after the White Stripes gained international success. In a 2006 interview with the Associated Press, White said he eventually moved out of Detroit because "he could not take the negativity anymore." However, in an effort to clarify his feelings towards the city of Detroit itself, he wrote and released a poem called "Courageous Dream's Concern" which expresses affection for his hometown.

I so love your heart that burns
That in your people's body yearns
To perpetuate, and permeate, the lonely dream that does encapsulate,
Your spirit, that God insulates,
With courageous dream's concern

— Excerpt from "Courageous Dream's Concern", as published in the Detroit Free Press

During their 2013 divorce proceedings, Elson entered into evidence an email White had sent her that included disparaging remarks about the Black Keys. When asked about the email in a 2014 Rolling Stone interview, White stood by the remarks, saying, "I'll hear TV commercials where the music's ripping off sounds of mine, to the point I think it's me. Half the time, it's the Black Keys." He later apologized for the comments. In September 2015, Black Keys drummer Patrick Carney posted a series of tweets alleging that White tried to fight him in a bar. White denied the claim in a statement to Pitchfork, saying that Carney should talk to him directly, and not on the internet. The following day, Carney posted a tweet saying, "Talked to Jack for an hour he's cool. All good." White tweeted on the Third Man Twitter account, "From one musician to another, you have my respect Patrick Carney."

On February 1, 2015, the University of Oklahoma's newspaper OU Daily ran a story regarding White's show of February 2 at McCasland Field House that included the publication of White's tour rider. The rider, especially the guacamole recipe it included and White's ban of bananas backstage, received some media coverage. It was later reported that, in response to the rider's publication, White's booking agency, William Morris Endeavor Entertainment, had banned its acts from playing shows at the University of Oklahoma. On February 15, White released an open letter addressed to "journalists and other people looking for drama or a diva" in which he referred to the guacamole recipe as his tour manager's "inside joke with local promoters" and "just something to break up the boredom" and the ban of bananas being alluded to food allergies of an unnamed tour member, while criticizing journalists who wrote about the rider as "out of their element". In the same letter, he forgave OU Daily for publishing the story and reaffirmed his affinity for the state of Oklahoma and his desire to perform there.

== Backing bands ==
Current lineup – No Name and Frozen Charlotte (2024–present)

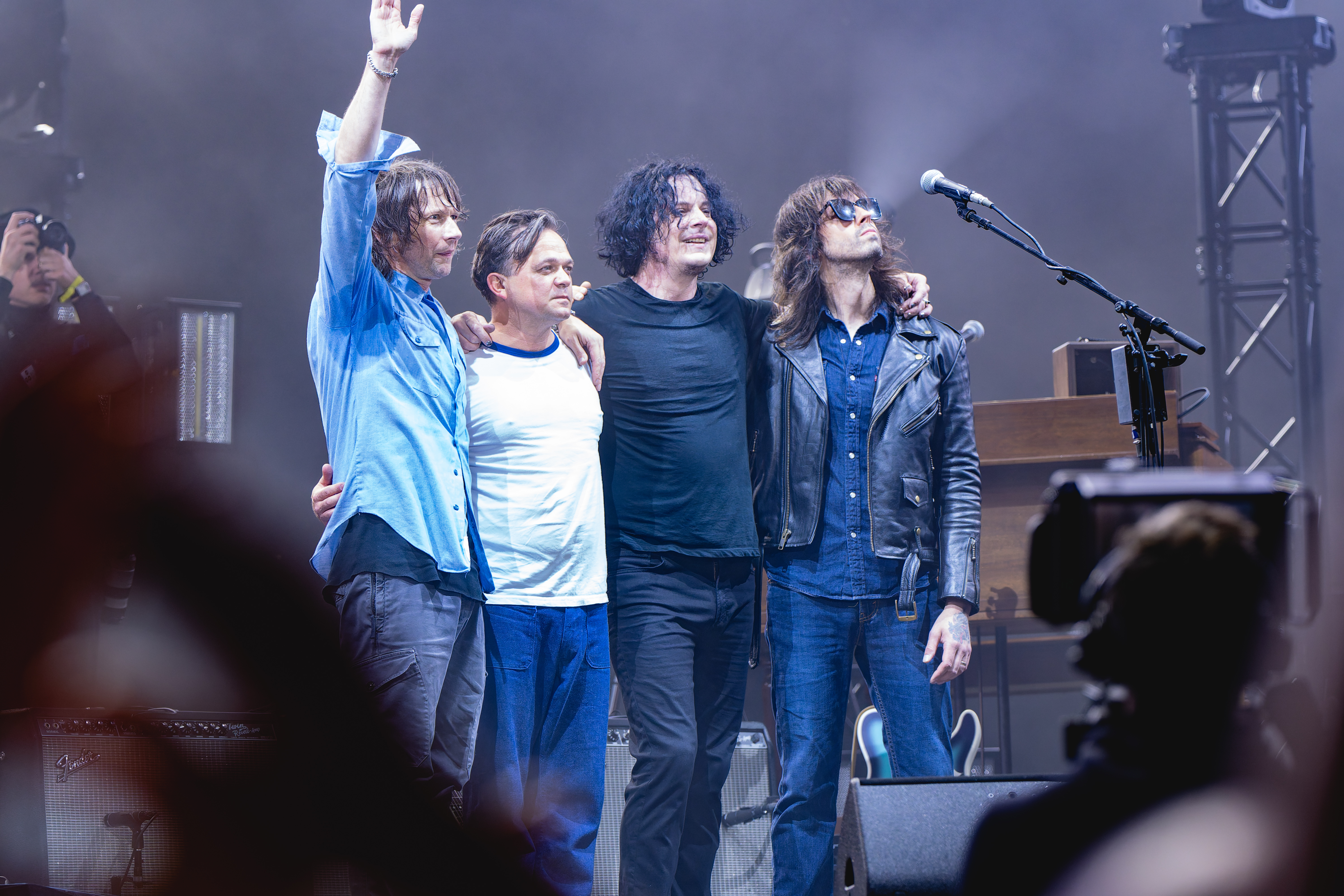
White's band during the No Name Tour (from left to right): Patrick Keeler, Dominic Davis, White, and Bobby Emmett

- Dominic Davis – bass, backing vocals
- Patrick Keeler – drums
- Bobby Emmett – keyboards, backing vocals

Fear of the Dawn and Entering Heaven Alive lineup

- Dominic Davis – bass, backing vocals
- Daru Jones – drums
- Quincy McCrary – keyboards, samples, synthesizer, organ, backing vocals

Boarding House Reach-era lineup

- Carla Azar – acoustic drums, percussion, backing vocals
- Dominic Davis – bass
- Neal Evans – piano, synthesizer, organ, keyboards, electronic drums, backing vocals
- Quincy McCrary – keyboards, samples, backing vocals

Lazaretto-era lineup

- Dominic Davis – bass
- Dean Fertita – Hammond organ, piano, keyboards
- Daru Jones – drums
- Fats Kaplin – pedal steel guitar, fiddle, mandolin, theremin
- Lillie Mae Rische – fiddle, mandolin, backing vocals

Lazaretto-era previous members

- Isaiah "Ikey" Owens – B3 organ, piano, keyboards (died on tour in 2014)
- Cory Younts – mandolin, harmonica, piano, keyboards, percussion, backing vocals

Blunderbuss-era lineup

Note: While on tour in support of Blunderbuss, White toured with two bands that he alternated between shows with.

The Buzzards (all-male band)

- Dominic Davis – bass
- Daru Jones – drums
- Fats Kaplin – pedal steel guitar, fiddle, mandolin, theremin
- Isaiah "Ikey" Owens – B3 organ, piano, keyboards
- Cory Younts – mandolin, harmonica, piano, keyboards, percussion, backing vocals

The Peacocks (all-female band)

- Ruby Amanfu – backing vocals
- Carla Azar – drums
- Maggie Bjorklund – pedal steel guitar, acoustic guitar
- Catherine Popper – bass
- Bryn Davies – bass
- Lillie Mae Rische – fiddle, mandolin, backing vocals
- Brooke Waggoner – piano, B3 organ, keyboards

== Discography ==
Solo albums

Main article: Jack White discography
- Blunderbuss (2012)
- Lazaretto (2014)
- Boarding House Reach (2018)
- Fear of the Dawn (2022)
- Entering Heaven Alive (2022)
- No Name (2024)
- Frozen Charlotte (2026)

With the White Stripes

Main article: The White Stripes discography
- The White Stripes (1999)
- De Stijl (2000)
- White Blood Cells (2001)
- Elephant (2003)
- Get Behind Me Satan (2005)
- Icky Thump (2007)

With the Raconteurs

Main article: The Raconteurs § discography
- Broken Boy Soldiers (2006)
- Consolers of the Lonely (2008)
- Help Us Stranger (2019)

With the Dead Weather

Main article: The Dead Weather § discography
- Horehound (2009)
- Sea of Cowards (2010)
- Dodge and Burn (2015)

== Filmography ==
- The Rosary Murders (1987) – uncredited altar boy
- Cold Mountain (2003) – Georgia
- Coffee and Cigarettes (2003) – Jack
- Under Blackpool Lights (2004) – Himself
- The Fearless Freaks (2005) – Himself
- The Simpsons, season 18, episode 2 (2006) – Himself (voice)
- Walk Hard: The Dewey Cox Story (2007) – Elvis Presley
- Shine a Light (2008) – Himself
- It Might Get Loud (2009) – Himself
- Mutant Swinger from Mars (2009) – Mikey
- Under Great White Northern Lights (2009) – Himself
- Conan O'Brien Can't Stop (2011) – Himself
- American Pickers (2012) – Himself
- Portlandia, season 3, episode 1 (2012) – Himself
- The Muppets, season 1, episode 16 (2016) – Himself
- American Epic (2017) – Himself
- The American Epic Sessions (2017) – Himself
- Jack White: Kneeling at The Anthem D.C. (2018) – Himself
- Killers of the Flower Moon (2023) – Radio Show Actor

== Written works ==
- We're Going to Be Friends (2017) – based on "We're Going to Be Friends" by the White Stripes
