= National Recording Preservation Foundation =

Nonprofit organization

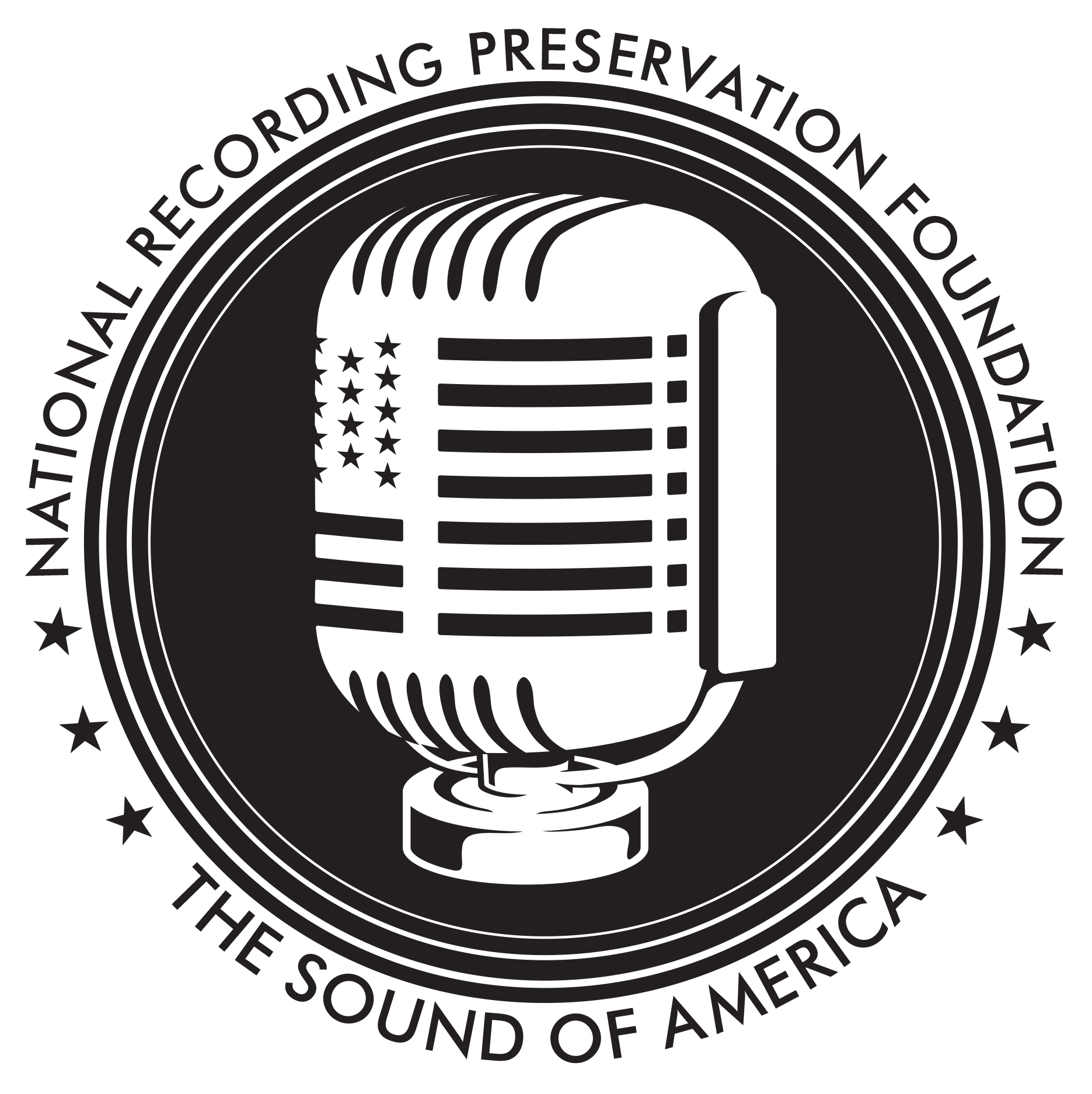
- Founded: 2000
- Type: Incentive
- Tax ID no.: 45-0983015
- Location: Washington, D.C.
- Origins: National Recording Preservation Act of 2000
- Website: recordingpreservation.org

The National Recording Preservation Foundation (NRPF) is an independent, nonprofit organization chartered by the U.S. Congress to preserve and raise awareness of recorded sound heritage. It was established under the National Recording Preservation Act of 2000, which initiated a national planning effort to encourage and coordinate the preservation of recorded sound heritage and led by the Library of Congress. In 2012, the NRPF was established and recognized by the IRS as a 501(c)(3) non-profit organization.

== History and Purpose ==
Since its creation, the NRPF has been charged to "ensure the preservation and public accessibility of the nation’s sound recording heritage" to the extent that it is held at public and nonprofit archives and other collections in the United States and its territories. The foundation's main focus is to "encourage, accept, and administer" private gifts and other resources so as to foster the preservation of this recorded legacy.

The primary mechanisms for this support have been private donations, such as a major donation from musician and producer Jack White in 2013. In addition, the foundation has coordinated benefit concerts to raise awareness, offered grants to support the preservation of significant audio collections, and coordinated information to encourage the responsible digitization and preservation of at-risk audio collections. The foundation's work is coordinated according to the National Recording Preservation Plan.

Since 2024, the NRPF has published and supported the Sound Files podcast, which features conversations with audio archivists, profiles significant audio preservation projects, and offers perspectives on the state of recorded sound preservation.

== See also ==
- National Recording Preservation Board
