= The Hentchmen =

- Origin: Detroit, Michigan, U.S.
- Genres: Garage punk Garage rock

The Hentchmen are an American garage punk band from Detroit, Michigan, United States, formed in October 1992. Early performances were in Ann Arbor and Detroit. They have released several albums on Norton Records. Jack White, later the leader of the group The White Stripes, played bass on the 1998 album Hentch-Forth.Five.

== Members ==
The founding members consisted of John Szymanski (as Johnny Volaire) on organ and vocals, Tim Purrier (as Tim V. Eight) on guitar, and Chris Handyside on drums. Mike Latulippe (as Mike Audi) replaced Handyside by The Hentchmen's third album Broad Appeal in 1997.

Jack White played bass for the band on their 1998 album Hentch-Forth.Five.

== Discography ==
=== Albums ===
- Ultra Hentch 1994
- Campus Party 1995
- Broad Appeal 1997
- Motorvatin 1998
- Hentch-Forth.Five 1998
- Three Times Infinity 2002
- Form Follows Function 2004
- The Hentchmen 2010
- XXV 2017
