= It Might Get Loud =

- Theatrical release poster
- Directed by: Davis Guggenheim
- Produced by: Thomas Tull; Davis Guggenheim; Lesley Chilcott; Peter Afterman
- Starring: The Edge; Jimmy Page; Jack White
- Cinematography: Erich Roland; Guillermo Navarro
- Edited by: Greg Finton
- Production company: Steel Curtain Pictures
- Distributed by: Sony Pictures Classics
- Release dates: September 5, 2008 (TIFF); August 14, 2009 (United States)
- Running time: 98 minutes
- Country: United States
- Language: English
- Box office: $1.8 million

It Might Get Loud is a 2008 American documentary film by filmmaker Davis Guggenheim. It explores the careers and musical styles of prominent rock guitarists Jimmy Page, the Edge, and Jack White. The film premiered at the 2008 Toronto International Film Festival, and received a wide release in the United States on August 14, 2009, by Sony Pictures Classics.

== Synopsis ==
The film documents the varied playing and recording styles of guitarists Jimmy Page, David "The Edge" Evans, and Jack White.

Page's history with guitar traces back to his childhood when he played in a skiffle band. After desiring to do more than play pop music, Page "retires" from guitar playing to attend art school. He later revives his music career as a session guitarist, only to be discouraged by the realization that he is playing others' music and stifling his own creativity. At that point, Page begins to write and perform in the bands The Yardbirds and Led Zeppelin. Page discusses the skiffle and blues music that influenced him at the time. For many of Page's scenes, he is seen visiting Headley Grange, where several songs from Led Zeppelin IV were recorded, and in one scene, explains how the distinctive drum sound from "When the Levee Breaks" was achieved from the acoustics of the house in which it was recorded.

Edge's history with guitar traces back to building a guitar with his brother Dik and learning to play. In the film, he visits Mount Temple Comprehensive School and recalls forming U2 in his childhood. He also demonstrates his playing technique, in how he eliminates certain strings from chords, as well as his use of echo and delay effects to "fill in notes that aren't there". He also discusses his purchase of his signature guitar, the Gibson Explorer, in New York City and the punk music that influenced him. In other scenes, he plays early demo tapes of "Where the Streets Have No Name", discusses his inspiration for "Sunday Bloody Sunday", and spends time experimenting with guitar effects for the riffs to "Get on Your Boots".

White traces his musical background to his childhood in a rundown neighborhood of Detroit. Living with two drum sets and a guitar occupying his room and sleeping on a piece of foam due to taking out his bed for more room for his instruments, White struggled to find a musical identity, as it was "uncool" to play an instrument and his nine siblings all shared a musical propensity. His strong interest in blues and roots music ran counter to the hip hop and house music popular in the predominantly Latino neighbourhood at the time. White eventually finds a niche in a garage rock band called The Upholsterers while working as an upholsterer, which paves the way for his future bands The White Stripes and The Raconteurs. White's philosophy is to limit and challenge himself in various ways to force creative approaches to recording and playing.

The touchstone of the film is a meeting of the three guitarists at a Los Angeles soundstage, dubbed "The Summit", on Jan. 23, 2008. In these scenes, the three guitarists not only converse about their influences and techniques, but they also play each other's songs together, showing each other how to play "I Will Follow", "Dead Leaves and the Dirty Ground", and "In My Time of Dying". The film concludes with the men playing an impromptu cover version of The Band's "The Weight" on acoustic guitars.

== Reception ==
Professional ratings
Aggregate scores
Source	Rating
Metacritic	70/100
Review scores
Source	Rating
Classic Rock	8/10 stars
Mojo	4/5 stars
Uncut	4/5 stars

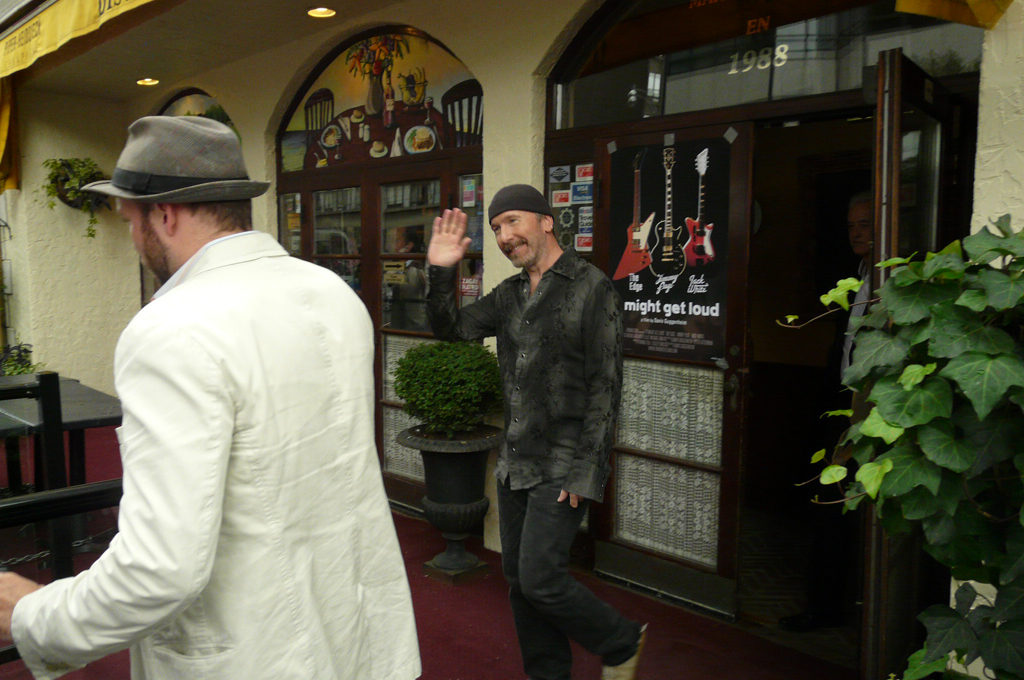
U2 guitarist The Edge on route to a press conference for the film at the 2008 Toronto International Film Festival.

The film premiered at the 2008 Toronto International Film Festival, and played at both Sundance Film Festival and the 59th Berlin International Film Festival in 2009. The film received generally favorable reviews, achieving an average critic review score of 70% on Metacritic, and currently holds a rating of 80% on Rotten Tomatoes, with a consensus of: "An affectionate tribute to rock's most distinctive instrument, It Might Get Loud is insightful and musically satisfying."

According to Phil Alexander, who gave the film a four-star review in Mojo magazine:

"It Might Get Loud is undoubtedly both a triumphant and truly absorbing 90-minute spectacle that provides the viewer with unique insight and entertainment in equal measure."

Barney Hoskyns of Uncut called it an "absorbing film".

Paul Elliott of Classic Rock describes the movie as: "...a bold, unique and insightful exploration into the lives of three very different guitarists with three very different stories to tell...All highly mouth-watering stuff."

== Box office ==
It Might Get Loud opened at #37 (shown in 7 theaters with $13,240 average) and took in a gross income of $92,679 in the opening weekend. The final domestic gross income was $1,610,163 while the foreign gross income was far lower at $197,343 for a worldwide gross income of $1,807,506.
