= Help Us Stranger =

Studio album by the Raconteurs
- Released: June 21, 2019
- Recorded: June 2018 – January 2019
- Studio: Third Man, Nashville
- Genre: Blues rock; garage rock
- Length: 41:14
- Label: Third Man
- Producer: The Raconteurs

The Raconteurs chronology
Consolers of the Lonely (2008)	Help Us Stranger (2019)

Singles from Help Us Stranger
- 1. "Sunday Driver" / "Now That You're Gone" Released: December 19, 2018; 2. "Hey Gyp (Dig the Slowness)" Released: April 10, 2019; 3. "Help Me Stranger" Released: May 17, 2019; 4. "Bored and Razed" Released: June 10, 2019; 5. "Somedays (I Don't Feel Like Trying)" Released: September 7, 2019

Help Us Stranger is the third studio album by American rock band the Raconteurs. It was released on June 21, 2019, through Third Man Records, their first studio album in 11 years following Consolers of the Lonely (2008). The album was recorded at Third Man Studio in Nashville, Tennessee, and mixed at Blackbird Studio in Nashville. It was produced by the band, engineered by Joshua V. Smith, and mixed by Vance Powell.

== Promotion and release ==
On the tenth anniversary of the band's second studio album, Consolers of the Lonely released in 2008, Third Man announced a re-issue of the album, along with two previously unreleased songs, "Sunday Driver" and "Now That You're Gone" were released as double A-side singles. Both songs received videos, which were shot a week before the release. On April 2, 2019, the album artwork, along with its track listing and release date were announced. On April 10, "Hey Gyp (Dig the Slowness)", a cover of the Donovan song, premiered on Bandcamp. Two days later, it was also made available on other platforms. On September 5, 2019, the band performed on The Tonight Show Starring Jimmy Fallon and performed the single "Only Child", as well as "Shine the Light on Me".

A limited edition LP release with lenticular cover art was sent out to Third Man Vault subscribers. This edition features a parodic photoshop of the original "butcher" cover for the Beatles' 1966 studio album Yesterday and Today, in which the Raconteurs' heads are pasted atop John Lennon, Paul McCartney, George Harrison, and Ringo Starr; the artwork is hidden beneath the lenticular print, mirroring Capitol Records' method of censoring the "butcher" cover, thus requiring buyers to peel it off in order to reveal the image.

== Critical reception ==
Professional ratings
Aggregate scores
Source	Rating
AnyDecentMusic?	7.5/10
Metacritic	81/100
Review scores
Source	Rating
AllMusic	4/5 stars
Chicago Tribune	3/4 stars
Consequence of Sound	B
DIY	4.5/5 stars
Exclaim!	8/10
The Guardian	3/5 stars
NME	4/5 stars
Pitchfork	6.4/10
Rolling Stone	4/5 stars
Slant Magazine	4.5/5 stars

Help Us Stranger received favourable reviews from music critics. At Metacritic, which assigns a normalized rating out of 100 to reviews from mainstream critics, the album received an average score of 81, based on 24 reviews. Loudwire named it one of the 50 best rock albums of 2019.

== Commercial performance ==
Help Us Stranger debuted at number one on the US Billboard 200 with 88,000 album-equivalent units, of which 84,000 were pure album sales. It was The Raconteurs' first US number-one album. It has also charted in the top ten in Canada, UK, Switzerland, the Netherlands and Belgium (Flanders region).

== Track listing ==
All tracks are written by Brendan Benson and Jack White, except "Hey Gyp (Dig the Slowness)" written by Donovan Leitch.

Help Us Stranger track listing
No.	Title	Length
1.	"Bored and Razed"	3:35
2.	"Help Me Stranger"	3:36
3.	"Only Child"	3:41
4.	"Don't Bother Me"	2:53
5.	"Shine the Light On Me"	3:28
6.	"Somedays (I Don't Feel Like Trying)"	4:06
7.	"Hey Gyp (Dig the Slowness)" (Donovan cover)	2:25
8.	"Sunday Driver"	3:38
9.	"Now That You're Gone"	4:01
10.	"Live a Lie"	2:20
11.	"What's Yours Is Mine"	2:49
12.	"Thoughts and Prayers"	4:42
Total length:		41:14

Third Man Records Vault edition bonus 7"
No.	Title	Length
1.	"Help Me Stranger" (demo)
2.	"Somedays (I Don't Feel Like Trying)" (demo)

== Personnel ==
Personnel adapted from album notes.

The Raconteurs

- Jack White – vocals, guitar, piano, synthesizer, production
- Brendan Benson – vocals, guitar, percussion, harmonica, production
- Jack Lawrence – bass guitar, guitar, synthesizer, backing vocals, production
- Patrick Keeler – drums, percussion, backing vocals, production

Additional musicians

- Dean Fertita – piano, synthesizers, guitar, organ
- Lillie Mae Rische – violin
- Scarlett Rische – mandolin
- Joshua V. Smith – backing vocals, organ

Technical personnel

- Michael Fahey – assistant mixing
- Dusty Fairchild – assistant engineering
- Vance Powell – mixing
- The Raconteurs – production, mixing
- Bill Skibbe – mastering
- Joshua V. Smith – engineering

Design

- Rob Jones – design, cover art concept
- Patrick Keeler – photography, design
- Tristan McNatt – cover art concept

== Charts ==
=== Weekly charts ===
Weekly chart performance for Help Us Stranger
Chart (2019)	Peak position
Australian Albums (ARIA)	23
Austrian Albums (Ö3 Austria)	7
Belgian Albums (Ultratop Flanders)	8
Belgian Albums (Ultratop Wallonia)	26
Canadian Albums (Billboard)	2
Dutch Albums (Album Top 100)	10
French Albums (SNEP)	22
German Albums (Offizielle Top 100)	14
Irish Albums (IRMA)	24
Italian Albums (FIMI)	34
Japanese Albums (Oricon)	84
New Zealand Albums (RMNZ)	38
Polish Albums (ZPAV)	28
Portuguese Albums (AFP)	25
Scottish Albums (OCC)	6
Spanish Albums (PROMUSICAE)	18
Swiss Albums (Schweizer Hitparade)	6
UK Albums (OCC)	8
US Billboard 200	1
US Top Alternative Albums (Billboard)	1
US Top Rock Albums (Billboard)	1

=== Year-end charts ===
Year-end chart performance for Help Us Stranger
Chart (2019)	Position
US Top Rock Albums (Billboard)	53
