= The Greenhornes discography =

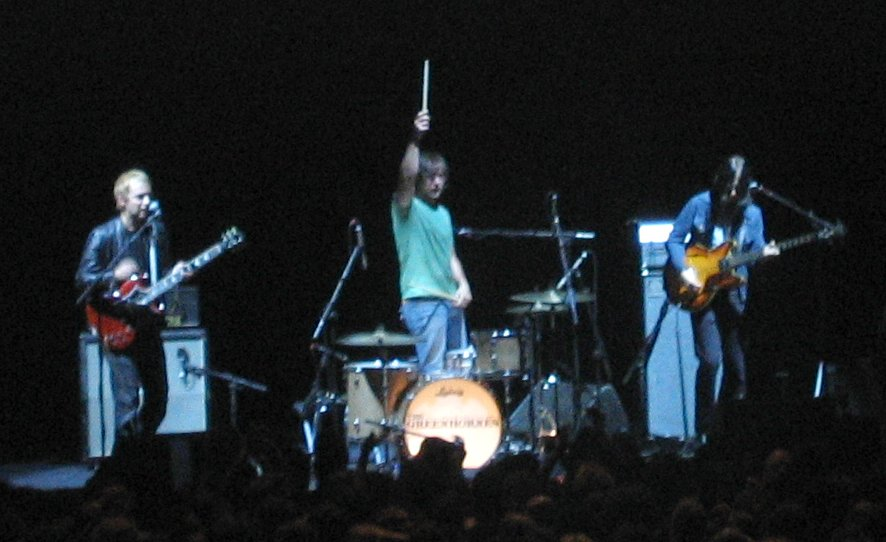
- The Greenhornes; From left to right: Craig Fox, Patrick Keeler, Jack Lawrence
- Studio albums: 4
- Extended plays: 1
- Compilation albums: 1
- Singles: 5
- Demo: 1

The discography of The Greenhornes, an American rock band, consists of four studio albums, one EP, five singles, one album of demos, and a compilation album.

== Studio albums ==
Year	Title	Peak chart positions					
Year	Title	US	AUS	BEL	FRA	NLD	UK
1999	Gun for You: Release: March 6, 1999; Label: Prince Records; Formats: CD	—	—	—	—	—	—
2001	The Greenhornes: Release: March 6, 2001; Label: Telstar; Formats: CD, LP	—	—	—	—	—	—
2002	Dual Mono: Release: October 15, 2002; Label: Telstar Records; Formats: CD, LP	—	—	—	—	—	—
2010	Four Stars: Release: November 9, 2010; Label: Third Man; Formats: CD, LP	—	—	—	—	—	—

== Demos/outtakes albums ==
Year	Title	Peak chart positions	
Year	Title	US	UK
2010	Boscobel Blues: Release: October 2010; Label: Third Man Records; Formats: LP	—	—
"—" denotes releases that did not chart.

== Compilation albums ==
Year	Title	Peak chart positions	
Year	Title	US	UK
2005	Sewed Soles: Release: November 29, 2005; Label: V2; Formats: CD, LP	—	—
"—" denotes releases that did not chart.

== Extended plays ==
Year	Title	Peak chart positions	
Year	Title	US	UK
2005	East Grand Blues / Pattern Skies: Release: August 2, 2005; Label: Alive Records; Formats: CD, LP	—	—

== Singles ==
Year	Title	Album
1998	"The End of the Night/No More"	Non-album single
2000	"Shadow of Grief/Stayed Up Last Night"	The Greenhornes
2002	"I Won't Take It Anymore/Lost Woman"	Non-album single
2003	"Lovin' in the Sun/Your Body, Not Your Soul"	Non-album single
2010	"Saying Goodbye/Song 13/Staying Together"	Four Stars
