= Salute Your Solution =

Single by the Raconteurs

from the album Consolers of the Lonely
- B-side: "Top Yourself (Bluegrass Version)"
- Released: March 25, 2008
- Genre: Garage rock
- Length: 3:00
- Label: Third Man; Warner Bros.
- Songwriters: Jack White III; Brendan Benson
- Producers: Jack White III; Brendan Benson

The Raconteurs singles chronology
"Level" (2007)	"Salute Your Solution" (2008)	"Many Shades of Black" (2008)

Music video
- "Salute Your Solution on YouTube

"Salute Your Solution" is a song by American rock band the Raconteurs. It is the first single from their second album Consolers of the Lonely. It was released on March 25, 2008 the same day as the album release. Jack White and Brendan Benson share lead vocal duties on the track.

The single peaked at number four on the Billboard Hot Modern Rock Tracks chart, their second highest-charting single (after 2006's "Steady, As She Goes").

== Music video ==
A music video was made for the single and was released on March 25, 2008. It was directed by Autumn de Wilde.

== Critical response ==
Commenting on the rhythm section by Patrick Keeler (drums) and Jack Lawrence (bass), Prefix Magazine said that "their propulsive rhythm single-handedly saves first single 'Salute Your Solution'." The Metro Times said the single "feature[s] monster guitar riffs that wouldn't sound out of place on a Free or early Aerosmith record." This song was number 42 on Rolling Stone's list of the 100 Best Songs of 2008.

== Track listing ==
=== 7" and 12" ===
Side A
No.	Title	Length
1.	"Salute Your Solution"	3:00

Side B
No.	Title	Length
1.	"Top Yourself (Bluegrass Version)"	4:38

== Charts ==
=== Weekly charts ===
Weekly chart performance for "Salute Your Solution"
Chart (2008)	Peak position
Canada Hot 100 (Billboard)	79
Canada Rock (Billboard)	6
Czech Republic Modern Rock (IFPI)	9
US Alternative Airplay (Billboard)	4
US Mainstream Rock (Billboard)	28

=== Year-end charts ===
Year-end chart performance for "Salute Your Solution"
Chart (2008)	Position
US Alternative Airplay (Billboard)	30
