= My Old, Familiar Friend =

Studio album by Brendan Benson
- Released: August 18, 2009
- Recorded: Nashville, TN and London, England
- Genre: Rock
- Length: 40:25
- Label: ATO Records
- Producers: Dave Sardy, Gil Norton

Brendan Benson chronology
The Alternative to Love (2005)	My Old, Familiar Friend (2009)	What Kind of World (2012)

Professional ratings
Aggregate scores
Source	Rating
Metacritic	72/100
Review scores
Source	Rating
AllMusic	3.5/5 stars
Drowned in Sound	5/10 stars
The Guardian	4/5 stars
Paste Magazine	(7.4/10)
Pitchfork Media	(7.0/10)
PopMatters	8/10 stars
Rolling Stone	3.5/5 stars
Slant Magazine	3.5/5 stars
Spin	3/5 stars

My Old, Familiar Friend is the fourth album by American musician Brendan Benson, released on August 18, 2009. The first single, "A Whole Lot Better," was released on the same day. The album debuted at No. 110 on the Billboard Top 200 Albums in the US.

My Old, Familiar Friend was recorded in 2007, in between Benson's work on Broken Boy Soldiers and Consolers of the Lonely, as a member of The Raconteurs.

== Track listing ==
All songs written by Brendan Benson, except where noted.

No.	Title	Writer(s)	Length
1.	"A Whole Lot Better"		3:23
2.	"Eyes on the Horizon"	Benson, Andrew Higley	3:54
3.	"Garbage Day"		3:21
4.	"Gonowhere"		3:47
5.	"Feel Like Taking You Home"	Benson, Dean Fertita	3:33
6.	"You Make a Fool Out of Me"		3:31
7.	"Poised and Ready"		3:11
8.	"Don't Wanna Talk"		3:48
9.	"Misery"		3:53
10.	"Lesson Learned"		4:29
11.	"Borrow"	Benson, Higley	3:38

=== iTunes bonus track ===
No.	Title	Length
12.	"I'll Never Tell"	3:14

=== Limited edition ===
No.	Title	Length
12.	"New Words of Wisdom"	2:59
13.	"I'll Never Tell"	3:14
