= Four Stars (album) =

Studio album by The Greenhornes
- Released: October 26, 2010 (iTunes); November 9, 2010
- Recorded: 2010 in Cincinnati, Ohio
- Genre: Garage rock, blues-rock
- Label: Third Man Records
- Producer: The Greenhornes; Jack White

The Greenhornes chronology
East Grand Blues (2005)	Four Stars (2010)

Professional ratings
Aggregate scores
Source	Rating
Metacritic	75/100
Review scores
Source	Rating
AllMusic	4/5 stars
The A.V. Club	B+
The Guardian	3/5 stars
NME	3.5/5 stars
Rolling Stone	3/5 stars
SPIN	7/10 stars

Four Stars (stylized as "★★★★" or) is the fourth and final studio album by rock band The Greenhornes. It was made available on iTunes on October 26, 2010, and the CD and LP versions released on November 9, 2010. It is their first studio album in eight years, with Dual Mono in 2002 and their first original release since East Grand Blues, an EP released in 2005. After the recording and release of East Grand Blues and their compilation album Sewed Soles in 2005, the group was on temporary hiatus, and Patrick Keeler and Jack Lawrence formed The Raconteurs with Detroit friends Jack White and Brendan Benson. After recording two albums and immense touring through North America, the UK and Australia, the group announced they would be taking a break and returning to their other bands. During this time, Lawrence and Keeler also performed as "The Do-Whatters", Jack White's rhythm band for a collaboration with Loretta Lynn on her album Van Lear Rose. After these projects, Jack Lawrence and Patrick Keeler reunited with Craig Fox again in Ohio, where they recorded Four Stars in mid-2010.

Although Four Stars was originally set to be released in October, the release date was later changed to October 26 on iTunes and November 9 on CD and LP. It was released on Jack White's Third Man Records label in Nashville, Tennessee.

Track 1, "Saying Goodbye", can be heard at the end of the 2011 film The Green Hornet.

== Vinyl formats ==
Like many Third Man Records releases, Four Stars was released on multiple varieties of unusually-colored vinyl. Along with the unlimited black vinyl version, "undisclosed" quantities of limited-edition green vinyl and silver vinyl records were produced.

== Track listing ==
All songs written by Craig Fox, Jack Lawrence and Patrick Keeler.

1. "Saying Goodbye" – 2:36
2. "Under Estimator" – 2:32
3. "Better Off Without It" – 3:27
4. "Cave Drawings" – 2:47
5. "Song 13" – 2:21
6. "My Sparrow" – 3:45
7. "Need Your Love" – 2:33
8. "Left The World Behind" – 2:25
9. "Go Tell Henry" – 3:13
10. "Jacob's Ladder" – 2:58
11. "Get Me Out of Here" – 3:00
12. "Hard To Find" – 3:24

== Personnel ==
- Craig Fox – lead vocals, guitars
- Jack Lawrence – bass guitars, lead vocals on "Go Tell Henry"
- Patrick Keeler – drums, percussion
- Andrew Higley – keyboards, piano
