= Hands (The Raconteurs song) =

2006 single by the Raconteurs

Single by the Raconteurs

from the album Broken Boy Soldiers
- Released: July 31, 2006
- Length: 4:03
- Label: V2; XL; Third Man
- Songwriters: Jack White; Brendan Benson
- Producers: Jack White; Brendan Benson

The Raconteurs singles chronology
"Steady, As She Goes" (2006)	"Hands" (2006)	"Broken Boy Soldier" (2006)

Alternative cover

"Hands" is the second single from American rock band the Raconteurs' debut album, Broken Boy Soldiers. Released in the United Kingdom on July 31, 2006, one of the B-sides is a live rendition of "It Ain't Easy", a cover version of Ron Davies's song. The music video for "Hands" was shot at the Dikemark psychiatric hospital in Asker (outside Oslo), Norway on July 4, 2006.

== Track listings ==
CD

1. "Hands"
2. "Intimate Secretary" (live)

7-inch (D)

1. "Hands"
2. "Store Bought Bones" (The Zane Rendition)

7-inch (E)

1. "Hands" (live)
2. "It Ain't Easy" (live)

== Charts ==
Chart (2006)	Peak position
Denmark (Tracklisten)	14
Scottish Singles Sales (Official Charts)	15
UK Singles (Official Charts)	29
UK Indie (Official Charts)	1
