= KRCW =

KRCW may refer to:

- KRCW-TV, a digital television station (channel 33 physical/32 PSIP) licensed to Salem, Oregon, United States
- KRCW (FM), a radio station (96.3 FM) licensed to Royal City, Washington, United States
