= Craig Fox =

Craig Fox may refer to:

- Craig Fox (musician) (born 1975), American musician
- Craig Fox (radio host), radio host and owner of radio stations
