= Many Shades of Black =

Single by The Raconteurs

from the album Consolers of the Lonely
- Released: August 25, 2008
- Studio: Blackbird Studio (Nashville, TN)
- Genre: Alternative rock; blues rock; jazz fusion
- Length: 4:24
- Label: Third Man; Warner Bros.
- Songwriters: Brendan Benson; Jack White
- Producers: Jack White III; Brendan Benson

The Raconteurs singles chronology
"Salute Your Solution" (2008)	"Many Shades of Black" (2008)	"Old Enough" (2008)

Alternative covers
- Cover with inner sleeve reversed

"Many Shades of Black" is a song by the band The Raconteurs. It appears as the eighth track on their second album, Consolers of the Lonely. It is second single from the album and was made available in 7" vinyl format. The cover art depicts Mary Todd Lincoln or Abraham Lincoln depending on the way the inner sleeve is turned. The track is also available as downloadable content for the music video game Rock Band 2.

The release of the single contains a version of the song performed by British singer Adele. Adele has performed this song live several times, including during her An Evening with Adele tour and it was included in the deluxe edition of her 19 album. The Adele version was featured in the ending of 90210 episode "Wild Alaskan Salmon" (episode 6, season 2).

== Charts ==
Chart (2008)	Peak position
US Alternative Airplay (Billboard)	37

== Track listing ==
1. "Many Shades of Black"
2. "Many Shades of Black" (performed by The Raconteurs and Adele)
