= Broken Boy Soldier (song) =

Single by The Raconteurs

from the album Broken Boy Soldiers
- Released: October 23, 2006
- Recorded: 2005; Le Grande Studios; (Detroit, Michigan, United States)
- Genre: Garage rock
- Length: 3:02
- Label: V2; XL; Third Man
- Songwriters: Jack White; Brendan Benson
- Producers: Jack White; Brendan Benson

The Raconteurs singles chronology
"Hands" (2006)	"Broken Boy Soldier" (2006)	"Level" (2006)

"Broken Boy Soldier" is the title track and the third single to be released from the album Broken Boy Soldiers by The Raconteurs, on October 23, 2006 in the UK. This track was used in an episode of the NBC television series Life.

One of the B-sides to the single is a live rendition of "Headin' for the Texas Border" by Flamin' Groovies.

== Track listing ==
CD

1. "Broken Boy Soldier"
2. "Broken Boy Soldier" (KCRW Session)
3. "Yellow Sun"

7" (F)

1. "Broken Boy Soldier"
2. "Headin' for the Texas Border" (Live)

7" (G)

1. "Broken Boy Soldier" (Live)
2. "Blue Veins" (KCRW Session)

== Charts ==
Chart (2006)	Peak position
Denmark (Tracklisten)	19
UK Singles (OCC)	22

== Music video ==
The video for this song features a toy soldier getting built by going through an adventure-like journey that leads to a boy receiving the toy on his birthday and then destroying it.
