= The Alternative to Love =

Studio album by Brendan Benson
- Released: March 14, 2005
- Recorded: Le Grand Studio, Detroit, MI
- Genre: Rock
- Length: 43:18
- Label: V2
- Producer: Brendan Benson, Tchad Blake

Brendan Benson chronology
Lapalco (2002)	The Alternative to Love (2005)	My Old, Familiar Friend (2009)

Singles from The Alternative to Love
- 1. "Spit It Out" Released: March 28, 2005; 2. "Cold Hands (Warm Heart)" Released: July 4, 2005; 3. "What I'm Looking For" Released: November 7, 2005

Professional ratings
Aggregate scores
Source	Rating
Metacritic	79/100
Review scores
Source	Rating
AllMusic	4.5/5 stars
Entertainment Weekly	B−
The Guardian	4/5 stars
Mojo	4/5 stars
NME	7/10
Pitchfork	7.2/10
Q	4/5 stars
Rolling Stone	3/5 stars
Spin	B−
Uncut	4/5 stars

The Alternative to Love is the third album by American singer-songwriter Brendan Benson, released in 2005. The song "Cold Hands (Warm Heart)" was featured on the Bones episode "A Boy in the Tree" and the Smallville episode "Exposed". The song "What I'm Looking For" was sampled on an iPod Touch commercial, as well as in the film Ghost Town. This is the last solo album Benson released before beginning the project band The Raconteurs with fellow Detroit native Jack White of The White Stripes.

The track "Flesh And Bone" was used in series one of the E4 drama Skins.

== Track listing ==
All songs written by Brendan Benson.

1. "Spit It Out" – 3:20
2. "Cold Hands (Warm Heart)" – 3:25
3. "Feel Like Myself" – 4:16
4. "Alternative to Love" – 4:35
5. "The Pledge" – 2:55
6. "Them and Me" – 4:00
7. "Biggest Fan" – 3:45
8. "Flesh and Bone" – 2:55
9. "Get It Together" – 3:32
10. "Gold into Straw" – 3:43
11. "What I'm Looking For" – 3:31
12. "Between Us" – 3:12
