= Dollar bill =

Dollar bill may refer to:

== Currency ==
- A dollar bill/banknote, used as currency with a denominated value of one dollar:
  - Australian one-dollar note
  - Canadian one-dollar bill
  - Hong Kong one-dollar note
  - New Zealand one-dollar note
  - United States one-dollar bill

== Music ==
- Dollar Bill (group), a Swedish hip hop group
- "Dollar Bill" (Screaming Trees song), 1993
- Dollar Bill (Jack White song), 2026
- "Dollar Bill", by R. Kelly from R. (R. Kelly album)

== People ==
- William "Dollar Bill" Blakley, two-time senator from Texas
- Dollar Bill, a recurring character in Billions
- Dollar Bill, a character in Lego Agents
- Dollar Bill, a minor character in Watchmen

== See also ==
- Bill Dollar (1950-1996), real name William Everett Dollar, radio host and DJ
- "Million Dollar Bill", a song by Whitney Houston
