= Yellow sun =

Yellow sun or Yellow Sun may refer to:

- Yellow Sun (nuclear weapon), a British nuclear weapon
- Yellow sun, a type of stellar classification
- "Yellow Sun", a song by The Raconteurs from their album Broken Boy Soldiers
- Half of a Yellow Sun, 2006 novel by Chimamanda Ngozi Adichie
