= The Nice Device =

American indie rock band (2000–2009)

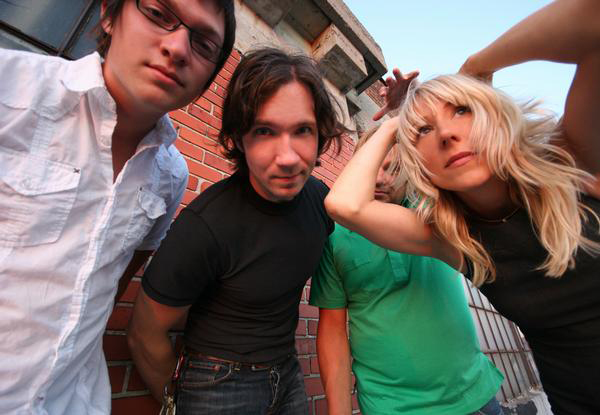
- The Nice Device 2008 lineup. Shot at the Russell Industrial Center in Detroit, Michigan.

Background information
- Origin: Hamtramck, Michigan; USA
- Genres: Indie rock Indie pop Garage rock
- Years active: 2000–2009
- Label: Independent
- Past members: Alicia Gbur; Matthew Lannoo; Nick Gerhardt; Jeffrey Alber; Rich Griffith; Zach Shipps; Matt Hatch; Steve Champine; Thomas Smak

The Nice Device were a four-piece, female-fronted band formed in 2000. The band's music bridged the exploding garage rock revival scene and the Detroit power pop scene with a polished, yet slightly trashy sound filled with hooks akin to The Buzzcocks, The Pixies, and Blondie.

== History ==
During the summer of 2000, local songwriter and accomplished folk artist Alicia Gbur, inspired by the thriving Detroit Rock scene wrote several songs with the intent to record and start a rock band. She asked mutual musician friends Zach Shipps (Electric Six) and Matt Aljian (Mood Elevator) to come to the studio and play on the initial recordings. Rehearsals started with Rich Griffith from Ann Arbor on bass. That same month, she met guitarist Matt Lannoo at a party. During the fall of 2000 Gbur, Lannoo and Griffith wrote and rehearsed while auditioning drummers eventually finding Nick Gerhardt (Plain). A handful of new songs were written and recorded. In early 2001 the first few shows were at the legendary Gold Dollar club in Detroit's Cass Corridor under the name The Nice Device. A few months later, Griffith was replaced on bass with Zach Shipps.

In 2002 The Nice Device entered Ghetto Recorders Studio with producer Jim Diamond (White Stripes, The Mooney Suzuki) and recorded three songs for their first official release, a 7" vinyl single. In 2003 the band began vigorously writing and submitting demos per request of Maverick Records in Hollywood CA. Unfortunately the record label underwent significant changes in staff and the band lost their A&R representation.

2004 saw the band recording their next batch of songs at Grand Studios in Detroit with Brendan Benson. Shipps left the band to tour in The Wellfed Boys (Brendan Benson) and Matt Hatch from The Sights took over on Bass. A video was shot for the single "My Little Birdie" at the historic Michigan Theater in Detroit. They released the EP titled Birth of a Lover later that year (produced by Zach Shipps and engineered by Brendan Benson) and instantly garnered a slew of favorable reviews, as well as a publishing deal with Pure Tone Music.

In 2005 they began writing songs for their first full length release eventually titled Let The Nightlife Down. Steve Champine was added on keyboards and recording with began at Studio 12ax7 in Hamtramck and Big Sky Studio in Ann Arbor. Yet another lineup change, Matt Hatch left and was replaced by Jeff Alber on bass in June 2005. The video for "Innocent" was shot by Lucky Airlines in early 2006 and by May the record was released and a US/CA tour followed. In January 2007, Steve Champine was replaced on keyboards with Thomas Smak until June 2008 at which time they became a four-piece again.

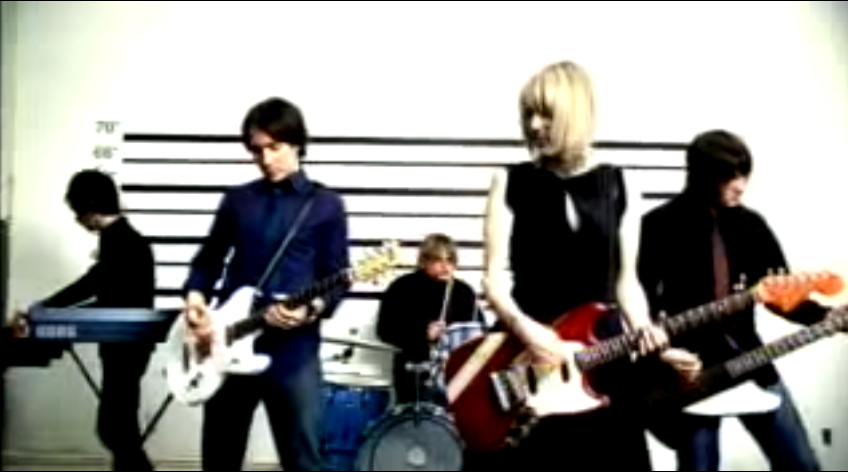
Video shoot for "Innocent" single.

In the summer of 2007 Alicia and Matt began rehearsing with Sire Records artists The Von Bondies for the upcoming release of a new EP titled "We are Kamikazes" and subsequent tours to follow. They took a several month hiatus from The Nice Device to rehearse and tour in The Von Bondies throughout the US, CA, UK, Europe and Scandinavia - eventually leaving the band in April 2008.

In the fall of 2008, The Nice Device regrouped and released their second EP titled Sorry We Killed You. It was recorded and produced at The Loft in Saline, MI by Tim Patalan, former member of another Sire Records artist The Fags. While finishing a planned final album, the band unofficially disbanded in the fall of 2009.

== Members ==
Final lineup:

- Alicia Gbur - vocals, guitar
- Matthew Lannoo - guitar, vocals
- Nick Gerhardt - drums
- Jeff Alber - bass, vocals

Past:

- Rich Griffith - bass
- Zach Shipps - bass
- Matt Hatch - bass
- Steve Champine - keyboards/synth
- Thomas Smak - keyboards/synth

== Work ==
=== Discography ===
- "Gotta Get It" (2003) single on 7" vinyl b/w "My Little Birdie" and "Bittersweet" (self-released)
- Birth of a Lover (2004) seven song EP on enhanced CD (self-released)
- Let The Nightlife Down (2006) 12 song full-length album (self-released)
- Sorry We Killed You (2008) five song EP (self-released)

Compilations:

- "Innocent" featured on the Maybelline NY/Jane Magazine - Pure Talent Reader CD No. 5 (2007)
- "Under Control" featured on the MC2 - Best of Motor City Music Conference (2005)
- "My Little Birdie" featured on the Pure Tone Music Publishing Compilation Volume 1 (2004)
- "Under Control" featured on the Detroit Breakdown - The Rocked Out Motor City Music Sampler (2004)

=== Videography ===
- "My Little Birdie" (2004) shot by 3alarm Carnival (directed by Kevin Leeser) at the historic Michigan Theater in downtown Detroit.
- "Innocent" (2006) shot by Lucky Airlines, directed by Nick Hill, edited by Sarah Fisher.

=== Miscellaneous ===
- Five songs from their album Let The Nightlife Down are featured in a documentary called Racer Girls filmed in London, U.K. - airing in 80 countries.
- A 45 minute live performance and interviews were filmed at The Magic Stick in Detroit - January 2007 for CanYouHearMeTV.com's Episode 6.
- The song "My Little Birdie" is used in the film Bachelor Party Vegas (2006) and the TV shows Life with Derek, Degrassi: The Next Generation and Radio Free Roscoe airing on The N television network for teens.
