= Steady, As She Goes =

2006 single by the Raconteurs

Single by the Raconteurs

from the album Broken Boy Soldiers
- Released: March 20, 2006
- Genre: Power pop; garage rock; blues rock; alternative rock
- Length: 3:36
- Label: V2, XL, Third Man
- Songwriters: Jack White, Brendan Benson
- Producers: Jack White, Brendan Benson

The Raconteurs singles chronology
"Steady, As She Goes" (2006)	"Hands" (2006)

"Steady, As She Goes" is the debut single of American rock band the Raconteurs from their debut album, Broken Boy Soldiers (2006). In early 2006, a limited-edition 7-inch vinyl record was released as a double A-sided single with the relatively unpromoted "Store Bought Bones" as the flipside. "Steady, As She Goes" was released to radio on March 20, 2006, and retail on April 24, with the B-side "Bane Rendition". Two further vinyl releases were produced: the first (marked 'B') with "Store Bought Bones" as the B-side; the second (marked 'C') an acoustic rendition of "Steady, As She Goes" with "Call It a Day" as the B-side.

In the United States, the song reached number 54 on the Billboard Hot 100 and number one on the Modern Rock Tracks chart. It achieved top-10 success in the UK and Denmark, peaking at number four in both countries.

== Background ==
"Steady, As She Goes" is the first song ever written by band members Jack White and Brendan Benson.

White and Benson lived three blocks apart from each other in Detroit, and White would often stop by Benson's house for brief visits. One day, Benson showed White a slow reggae demo of what would become "Steady, As She Goes". Benson had played all the instruments on the demo, but only had one verse, "Find yourself a girl and settle down..." White took that idea and started writing.

White said to Uncut in 2006, "It’s asking a question, which is, 'Is doing that – getting married and settling down – starting a new life or is it giving up?'" Speaking again to Uncut in 2006, he added, "I think the big notion in my head was we’re all getting older now and enough of goofing around. All our friends are musicians, so it was like, 'How much of this world can we stay a part of and how much do we reject?'"

== Critical response ==
Entertainment Weekly said the track is "less weird than what we're used to from the ghostly singer." Rolling Stone called "Steady, As She Goes" the second best song of 2006, just behind "Crazy" by Gnarls Barkley. The bass in the song, especially in the intro, has drawn comparisons to the song "Is She Really Going Out With Him?" by Joe Jackson.

In 2007, "Steady, As She Goes" was nominated for a Grammy Award for Best Rock Performance by a Duo or Group with Vocal.

== Music video ==
There are two music videos for "Steady, As She Goes". The first music video was directed by Jim Jarmusch, and focuses on the band performing the song. It premiered on MTV Two on March 10, 2006, and was also available for streaming on the band's website. In the second music video, directed by The Malloys, the Raconteurs teamed up with Paul Reubens. In this video, each band member plays an imaginary speed-racing hero in an old-fashioned soapbox race, following the heroes on their cut-throat chase for first place. Reubens plays an unscrupulous pit boss, stooping to low levels to ensure a win for his racer, Jack Lawrence. Lawrence and Reubens (wearing standard melodrama-villain handlebar moustaches) cheat many times throughout the race, to make sure that Lawrence wins. Patrick falls off a cliff, Brendan crashes, and Reubens shoots White ("the Copper Kid") with a blow gun. Lawrence wins. The latter video premiered exclusively on Yahoo! Music on June 19, 2006.

== Track listings ==
7-inch single: A and B

A. "Steady, As She Goes" – 3:38 (3:35 on B)
B. "Store Bought Bones" – 2:27 (2:25 on B)

7-inch single: C

A. "Steady, As She Goes" (acoustic) – 4:11
B. "Call It a Day" – 3:34

US and UK CD single

1. "Steady, As She Goes" – 3:35
2. "The Bane Rendition" – 4:20

Australian CD single

1. "Steady, As She Goes" – 3:37
2. "The Bane Rendition" – 4:19
3. "Steady, As She Goes" (acoustic) – 4:10

== Charts ==
=== Weekly charts ===
Weekly chart performance for "Steady, As She Goes"
Chart (2006)	Peak position
Australia (ARIA)	47
Belgium (Ultratip Bubbling Under Flanders)	5
Canada (Nielsen BDS)	47
Canada Rock (Billboard)	1
Denmark (Tracklisten)	4
Europe (Eurochart Hot 100)	15
Finland (Suomen virallinen lista)	16
New Zealand (Recorded Music NZ)	22
Scottish Singles Sales (Official Charts)	4
UK Singles (Official Charts)	4
UK Indie (Official Charts)	1
US Billboard Hot 100	54
US Adult Alternative Airplay (Billboard)	7
US Adult Pop Airplay (Billboard)	19
US Alternative Airplay (Billboard)	1
US Mainstream Rock (Billboard)	30

=== Year-end charts ===
Year-end chart performance for "Steady, As She Goes"
Chart (2006)	Position
Canada Rock (Radio & Records)	4
UK Singles (OCC)	82
US Alternative Songs (Billboard)	5

== Certifications ==
Certifications for "Steady, As She Goes"
Region	Certification	Certified units/sales
United Kingdom (BPI)	Gold	400,000^{‡}
^{‡} Sales+streaming figures based on certification alone.

== Release history ==
Release dates and formats for "Steady, As She Goes"
Region	Date	Format(s)	Label(s)	Ref.
United States	March 20, 2006	Triple A; alternative radio	V2; Third Man	
United Kingdom	April 24, 2006	7-inch vinyl; CD	XL; Third Man	
Australia	May 8, 2006	7-inch vinyl; CD	XL; Third Man	
United States	June 27, 2006	Contemporary hit radio	V2	
