= One Mississippi (Brendan Benson album) =

Studio album by Brendan Benson
- Released: 1996
- Recorded: November 1995 and February 1996
- Studio: Hyde St.
- Genre: Pop rock
- Length: 42:59
- Label: Virgin
- Producer: Brendan Benson, Ethan Johns

Brendan Benson chronology
One Mississippi (1996)	Lapalco (2002)

One Mississippi is the debut album by American singer and songwriter Brendan Benson. It was released in 1996 in America and 1997 in Great Britain.

== Critical reception ==
Professional ratings
Review scores
Source	Rating
AllMusic	4/5 stars
Pitchfork Media	7.9/10

The Province wrote that "Benson has one of those fragile, boyish quavering voices that underscores his otherwise-melodic pop-rock songs with a sense of vulnerability—which, for historical reference, puts him closer to Syd Barrett than the Beatles." The Vancouver Sun noted the "jangly electric guitar and classic pop structures."

== Track listing ==
All songs written by Brendan Benson unless otherwise stated.

1. "Tea" – 1:08
2. "Bird's Eye View" – 1:28
3. "Sittin' Pretty" – 2:53 (Benson/Jason Falkner)
4. "I'm Blessed" – 3:00 (Benson/Falkner)
5. "Crosseyed" – 4:22 (Benson/Falkner)
6. "Me Just Purely" – 2:44 (Benson/Falkner)
7. "Got No Secrets" – 3:22
8. "How 'Bout You" – 3:02
9. "Emma J" – 3:49
10. "Insects Rule" – 3:08 (Benson/Falkner)
11. "Maginary Girl" – 3:06
12. "House in Virginia" – 3:49 (Benson/Falkner)
13. "Cherries" – 3:19 (Benson/Falkner)
  - "Strawberry Rhubarb Pie" (hidden track) – 1:44

The album was re-released in 2003 with the following additional tracks:

1. "Swamp"
2. "Jet Stream"
3. "Crosseyed (Demo)"
4. "Me Just Purely (Demo)"
5. "Cherries (Demo)"
6. "I'm Blessed (Demo)"
7. "Sittin' Pretty (Demo)"
8. "Christy (Demo)"
