= Lapalco =

Studio album by Brendan Benson
- Released: February 26, 2002
- Recorded: 2001
- Genres: Power pop; experimental pop
- Length: 46:20
- Label: Startime International
- Producers: Brendan Benson, Jason Falkner

Brendan Benson chronology
One Mississippi (1996)	Lapalco (2002)	The Alternative to Love (2005)

Singles from Lapalco
- 1. "Folk Singer" Released: April 22, 2002; 2. "Tiny Spark" Released: July 8, 2002; 3. "Good to Me" Released: October 28, 2002

Professional ratings
Review scores
Source	Rating
AllMusic	4.5/5 stars
The Daily Illini	B−
NME	9/10
Pitchfork	7.4/10

Lapalco is the second album by American singer-songwriter Brendan Benson, released in 2002. The name "Lapalco" is in reference to Lapalco Boulevard, a major highway which runs through Harvey, Louisiana, where Benson spent part of his youth. The street name is an acronym of "Louisiana Power And Light Company", the former name of the power company that owned the right of way to the property that the highway was built on. Cover and design was done by Roe Peterhans and photography by Andy Kemp.

The song "Tiny Spark" featured on an episode in the fourth series of Teachers, as well as in the feature films Along Came Polly, and World's Greatest Dad.

== Track listing ==
All songs written and performed by Brendan Benson unless otherwise stated.

1. "Tiny Spark" – 3:16 (Benson/Falkner)
2. "Metarie" – 3:41
3. "Folk Singer" – 3:50 (Benson/Falkner)
4. "Life in the D" – 3:12
5. "Good to Me" – 2:47 (Benson/Falkner)
6. "You're Quiet" – 2:47
7. "What" – 3:36 (Benson/Falkner)
8. "Eventually" – 4:17
9. "I'm Easy" – 2:59 (Benson/Falkner)
10. "Pleasure Seeker" – 3:35
11. "Just Like Me" – 3:55
12. "Jet Lag" – 4:37
  - "Metarie (demo version)" (hidden track) – 3:30
