= You Were Right (album) =

Studio album by Brendan Benson
- Released: December 10, 2013
- Genre: Rock
- Length: 46:30
- Label: Readymade (US); Lojinx (Europe)
- Producer: Brendan Benson

Brendan Benson chronology
What Kind of World (2012)	You Were Right (2013)	Dear Life (2020)

Professional ratings
Aggregate scores
Source	Rating
Metacritic	73/100
Review scores
Source	Rating
Allmusic	4/5 stars
Mojo	4/5 stars
Uncut	8/10 stars
Daily Express	4/5 stars
American Songwriter	3.5/5 stars
NME	6/10
Drowned in Sound	5/10

You Were Right is the sixth studio album by American singer-songwriter Brendan Benson. The album was released in December 2013 under Benson's own label Readymade Records in the US, and Lojinx in Europe.

== Track listing ==
All tracks are written by Brendan Benson.

No.	Title	Length
1.	"It's Your Choice"	3:34
2.	"Rejuvenate Me"	2:26
3.	"As of Tonight"	3:07
4.	"Diamond"	2:58
5.	"Long Term Goal"	2:42
6.	"I Don't Wanna See You Anymore"	3:15
7.	"I'll Never Tell"	3:16
8.	"Swallow You Whole"	3:41
9.	"She's Trying to Poison Me"	2:31
10.	"Purely Automatic"	4:34
11.	"New Words of Wisdom"	3:02
12.	"Oh My Love"	2:58
13.	"The Fritz" (CD bonus track)	1:37
14.	"Swimming" (CD bonus track)	3:49
15.	"Red White and Blues" (CD bonus track)	3:00

== Personnel ==
- Brendan Benson - Composer
- Michael Andrews - Composer
- Ashley Monroe - Composer
- Sarah Siskind - Composer
- Young Hines - Composer
- Ken Stringfellow - Bass, Keyboards
- Seth Timbs - Bass
- Jon Auer - Bass, Guitar
- Dean Fertita - Keyboards
- Brad Pemberton - Drums
- Matt Mahaffey - Drums

== Credits ==
- Tyler Bergfield - Cover
- Adriel Denae - Photography
- Laura Keating - Layout
- Chris Mara - Engineer
- Greg Thompson - Assistant Engineer
- David Towne - Mastering Assistant
- Tommy Wiggins - Mastering
