= What Kind of World (Brendan Benson album) =

Studio album by Brendan Benson
- Released: April 21, 2012
- Recorded: Welcome to 1979 Studios
- Genre: Rock, Alternative country
- Label: Readymade Records (US), Lojinx (Europe)
- Producer: Brendan Benson

Brendan Benson chronology
My Old, Familiar Friend (2009)	What Kind of World (2012)	You Were Right (2013)

What Kind of World is the fifth album by American singer-songwriter Brendan Benson. The album's release on April 21, 2012 coincided with his son's second birthday. The album was released on Benson's own Readymade Records in the US and British indie label Lojinx in Europe. It peaked at number 7 on the UK Indie album chart in the week of release.

== Track listing ==
All songs written by Brendan Benson unless otherwise stated.

1. "What Kind of World" - 4:07
2. "Bad for Me" - 4:05
3. "Light of Day" - 3:33
4. "Happy Most of the Time" - 3:40
5. "Keep Me" - 2:14
6. "Pretty Baby" - 3:24
7. "Here in the Deadlights" - 3:09
8. "Met Your Match" - 2:38
9. "Thru the Ceiling" - 3:03 (Benson/Jay Joyce)
10. "No One Else but You" - 3:46
11. "Come On" - 2:51
12. "On the Fence" - 3:54 (Benson/Ashley Monroe)

== Personnel ==
- Brendan Benson - Lead Vocals, Guitar, Keyboards
- Max Abrams - Alto Saxophone, Baritone Saxophone
- Sam Farrar - Bass, Guitar, Ambience
- Brad Pemberton - Drums, Percussion
- Jay Joyce - Guitar
- Jon Auer - Guitar, Bass
- Mark Watrous - Guitar, Bass, Keyboards
- Andrew Higley - Keyboards
- Bill Livsley - Keyboards
- Ken Stringfellow - Keyboards, Bass
- Pete Finney - Pedal Steel Guitar
- Mitch Reilley - Tenor Saxophone
- Jon-Paul Frappier - Trumpet
- Ashley Monroe, Luke Skidmore, Neil O'Neil, Tyler Jones, Young Hines - Vocals

== Credits ==
- Recorded and Mixed in Nashville, Tennessee at Welcome To 1979 Studios
- Engineered by Greg Thompson and Joe Costa
- Mastered by Tommy Wiggins
- Mixed by Brendan Benson and Chris Mara
- Photography by Jo McCaughey
- Artwork by They Make It In The Basement

== Charts ==
Chart (2012)	Peak position
UK Albums (OCC)	191
UK Independent Albums (OCC)	34
US Billboard 200	159
US Heatseekers Albums (Billboard)	1
US Independent Albums (Billboard)	29
