= KZTB =

- Milton-Freewater, Oregon; United States
- Broadcast area: Tri-Cities, Washington
- Frequency: 97.9 MHz
- Branding: La Gran D 97.9

Programming
- Format: Regional Mexican

Ownership
- Owner: Amador and Rosalie Bustos; (Bustos Media Holdings, LLC)
- Sister stations: KRCW, KMMG

History
- First air date: 1992 (as KLKY)
- Former call signs: KUDO (1988–1989, CP); KLUB (1989–1992, CP); KLKY (1992–1997); KTHK (1997–2003); KOLW (2003–2004); KHTO (2004–2006) KMMG (2006)

Technical information
- Licensing authority: FCC
- Facility ID: 953
- Class: C1
- ERP: 100,000 watts
- HAAT: 274 meters (899 feet)
- Transmitter coordinates: 45°47′41″N 118°10′06″W

Links
- Public license information: Public file; LMS
- Webcast: Listen Live
- Website: laradiodeaqui.com

KZTB (97.9 FM, "La Gran D 97.9") is a radio station licensed to serve Milton-Freewater, Oregon, United States. The station, which began broadcasting in 1992, is currently owned by Amador and Rosalie Bustos and the broadcast license is held by Bustos Media Holdings, LLC.

== Programming ==
KZTB broadcasts a Spanish-language regional Mexican format as part of Adelante's nationally syndicated "La Gran D" radio network. The station serves the greater Tri-Cities, Washington, area. The Tri-Cities area, dubbed the "Heart of Washington's Wine Country", is now home to an increasing population of Hispanics, primarily immigrants from Mexico.

== History ==
=== The beginning ===
This station received its original construction permit for a new 500 watt FM station broadcasting on 97.9 MHz from the Federal Communications Commission on December 14, 1987. The new station was assigned the call sign KUDO by the FCC on April 29, 1988. The assigned callsign for the still-under construction station was changed to KLUB on August 1, 1989.

In April 1992, permit holder Nanette Markunas applied to the FCC to transfer the construction permit to Alexandria Communications. The transfer was approved by the FCC on October 2, 1992, and the transaction was consummated on October 16, 1992. While the transfer was in process, the callsign was changed, this time to KLKY, on September 21, 1992.

After several extensions, the permit transfer, and an authorization to increase effective radiated power to 5,100 watts, KLKY received its license to cover from the FCC on May 17, 1993.

=== Major chain ownership ===
In June 1997, Alexandria Communications reached an agreement to sell this station to Citadel License, Inc., a subsidiary of Citadel Broadcasting. The deal was approved by the FCC on August 12, 1997, and the transaction was consummated on September 25, 1997. Between approval and consummation, the station's callsign was changed to KTHK on September 10, 1997.

In February 1999, Citadel License, Inc., agreed to sell KTHK to Marathon Media, L.P. The deal was approved by the FCC on September 13, 1999. An October 1999 internal corporate realignment saw Marathon Media, L.P., apply to transfer the license for KTHK to Marathon Media Group, LLC. The transfer was approved by the FCC on November 8, 1999, and the transaction was consummated on November 9, 1999.

In December 2000, Marathon Media Group, LLC, announced it had contracted to sell KTHK to Clear Channel Communications through its Clear Channel Broadcasting Licenses, Inc., subsidiary as part of a five-station deal valued at $11 million. The deal was approved by the FCC on February 15, 2001, and the transaction was consummated on February 21, 2001. A January 2001 internal restructuring had Clear Channel Broadcasting Licenses, Inc., apply to transfer the broadcast license to Capstar TX Limited Partnership. The transfer was approved by the FCC on February 5, 2001, and the transaction was consummated on April 16, 2001.

The station's call sign was changed to KOLW on July 3, 2003. Just over a year later, in August 2004, Capstar TX Limited Partnership reached an agreement to swap KOLW to ALC Communications in exchange for KHTO (97.5 FM, now KOLW, in Basin City). ALC Communications also received $1 million cash as part of this transaction. The deal was approved by the FCC on November 9, 2004, and the transaction was consummated on January 11, 2005. While the sale was in progress, on October 31, 2004, the callsign was changed to KHTO, the other station involved in the swap.

In January 2005, ALC Communications applied to the FCC to transfer this station to Alexandra Communications, Inc. The deal was approved by the FCC on April 11, 2005, and the transaction was consummated on April 13, 2005.

=== Swap to Bustos ===
Previous "Ke Buena" branding

In December 2005, Alexandra Communications, Inc. (Tom Hodgins, president/treasurer) reached an agreement to swap this station with Bustos Media (Amador S. Bustos, owner/president) for KMMG (101.9 FM, now KNHK-FM, in Weston, Oregon) through their subsidiary Bustos Media of Eastern Washington License, LLC. In addition to the Weston station, Bustos Media agreed to pay Alexandra Communications $900,000 in cash at closing. The deal was approved by the FCC on February 22, 2006, and the transaction was consummated on April 10, 2006. At the time of the sale, KHTO broadcast a contemporary hit radio music format.That CHR station was named OK95Radio.com Live at 97.9.

The freshly swapped KHTO had its callsign changed to that of its counterpart in the exchange, KMMG, on March 1, 2006. This change was short-lived as less than two weeks later the station was assigned the current KZTB call letters by the FCC on March 14, 2006.

As recently as the Fall 2007 ratings period, KZTB ranked as the top radio station targeting Hispanic listeners in the Tri-Cities area, as defined by Arbitron, and their 5.6 share tied them for 4th overall in the 12+ rankings. However, the station dropped the locally programmed "Zorro" programming in favor of the "Ke Buena" syndicated fare in April 2007 and the ratings have slipped sharply since then. The programming shift was described as "a reallocation of dollars" by station management. In the Fall 2008 ratings data, released in February 2009, the station had slipped to a 0.9 share 12+ and 22nd overall.

In September 2010, Bustos transferred most of its licenses to Adelante Media Group as part of a settlement with its lenders.

Effective December 10, 2014, Bustos Media reacquired KZTB, as well as eight other stations and a translator, from Adelante Media for $6 million.
