= Dollar Bill (Jack White song) =

Single by Jack White

from the album Frozen Charlotte
- Released: June 10, 2026
- Genre: Blues
- Length: 2:42
- Label: Third Man
- Songwriter: Jack White
- Producer: Jack White

Jack White singles chronology
"G.O.D. and the Broken Ribs" and "Derecho Demonico" (2026)	"Dollar Bill" (2026)

"Dollar Bill" is a song by the American musician Jack White, released as the second single from his seventh studio album Frozen Charlotte (2026) on June 10, 2026. It was announced via a 30-second preview upload to a channel named "The Frozen Charlatan", with the video simply titled "$$$".

== Composition and lyrics ==
Solely written and produced by Jack White, "Dollar Bill" discusses the many things people will do for money, with Consequence noting that "There's none of the lyrical denseness of "Icky Thump" or "Archbishop Harold Holmes," just repeated clauses".

== Release and reception ==
In a review of the single for The New York Times, Jon Pareles state that a "Cranked-up slide guitar and crashing drums propel Jack White through "Dollar Bill," a harangue about motivation and money" In a ranking of all 25 singles released by Jack White, it was placed at number 18, with Taylor Mims stating that "the track is overflowing with guitar runs that only a devout player of White's caliber could fit into less than three minutes", noting that "The fury with which White blazes through "Dollar Bill" is why he continues to make the best rock albums every year despite being nearly three decades into his career." In a review of Frozen Charlotte, Emma Swann of DIY magazine believed White was "using his guitar to create the hook, with some lovely slide guitar to boot[.]" David Fricke of Rolling Stone thought it "sound[ed] like a National Steel on steroids until the solo, when it turn[ed] into what seems like a theremin gone postal." PopMatters writer Greg M. Schwartz called it a "screed against the pervasive greed that threatens American democracy and the planet's climate." noting that "There's killer slide guitar to amplify the message, and there are very few who can dial in that vintage slide tone these days as exquisitely as Jack White does." In Paste magazine, writer Grant Sharples said the single "fits tidily within the album-wide critique of avarice, oligarchy, and political narcissism. It's topical for someone who's become a target of recent right-wing vitriol for his well-documented disdain of the Trump administration".

== Personnel ==
According to Tidal:

Musicians

- Jack White – lead vocals, lead guitar
- Dominic Davis – electric bass guitar
- Patrick Keeler – drums, percussion
- Bobby Emmett – Hammond organ

Production

- Jack White – songwriter, producer, mixing engineer
- Dan Mancini – assistant engineer
- Hartford Pittman – assistant engineer
- Shibby Poole – assistant engineer
- Bill Skibbe – mastering engineer, mixinng engineer
