= KMMG =

- Benton City, Washington; United States
- Broadcast area: Tri-Cities, Washington
- Frequency: 96.7 MHz
- Branding: La Zeta 96.7

Programming
- Format: Regional Mexican

Ownership
- Owner: Amador and Rosalie Bustos; (Bustos Media Holdings, LLC)
- Sister stations: KRCW, KZTB

History
- First air date: January 26, 1981; 45 years ago (as KREW-FM)
- Former call signs: KREW-FM (1981–1996); KZTB (1996–2006)

Technical information
- Licensing authority: FCC
- Facility ID: 4758
- Class: A
- ERP: 820 watts
- HAAT: 271 meters (889 ft)
- Transmitter coordinates: 46°14′4.00″N 119°19′13.00″W

Links
- Public license information: Public file; LMS
- Webcast: Listen Live
- Website: laradiodeaqui.com

KMMG (96.7 FM) is a radio station broadcasting a regional Mexican format. Licensed to Benton City, Washington, United States, the station serves the Tri-Cities area. The station is currently owned by Amador and Rosalie Bustos, through licensee Bustos Media Holdings, LLC.

== History ==
The station went on the air as KREW-FM on January 26, 1981. On November 18, 1996, the station changed its call sign to KZTB. On March 14, 2006, it became the current KMMG.

Bustos Media used to own the station. In September 2010, Bustos transferred most of its licenses to Adelante Media Group as part of a settlement with its lenders.

Effective December 10, 2014, Bustos Media repurchased KMMG from Adelante Media, along with eight other stations and a translator, for $6 million.

On December 31, 2014 KMMG changed their format to regional Mexican, branded as "La Zeta 96.7".
