= Craig Fox (musician) =

American rock musician

- Born: Craig James Fox; May 16, 1975 (age 50)
- Origin: West Harrison, Indiana, U.S., resides Cincinnati, Ohio
- Genres: Rock, blues-rock, garage rock revival, bluegrass
- Occupations: Musician, singer-songwriter, multi-instrumentalist,
- Instruments: Vocals, guitar
- Years active: 1997–present
- Labels: V2, Prince Records, Telstar Records

Craig James Fox is an American rock musician from West Harrison, Indiana, best known as the lead singer and guitarist for the Cincinnati band The Greenhornes. Fox also plays guitar in other Cincinnati, Ohio-based bands called The Cincinnati Suds, lead vocals/guitar in Oxford Cotton, and backing guitar/vocals in Pearlene.

== Discography ==
- 1999 The Greenhornes – Gun For You
- 2001 The Greenhornes – The Greenhornes
- 2002 The Greenhornes – Dual Mono
- 2005 The Greenhornes – East Grand Blues
- 2005 The Greenhornes – Sewed Soles
- 2007 The Cincinnati Suds – In Your Bedroom
- 2010 The Greenhornes – Four Stars
