= The Greenhornes =

American garage rock band

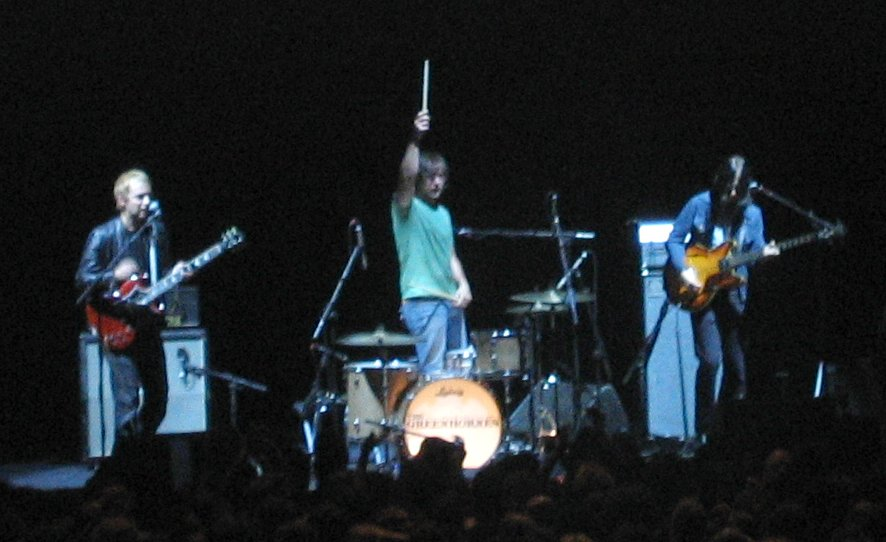
- Left to right: Craig Fox, Patrick Keeler and Jack Lawrence.

Background information
- Origin: Cincinnati, Ohio, United States
- Genres: Garage rock; blues rock; psychedelic rock
- Years active: 1996–2012
- Labels: V2; Telstar (Hoboken); Third Man
- Members: Craig Fox; Jack Lawrence; Patrick Keeler
- Past members: Brian Olive; Jared McKinney; Eric Stein

The Greenhornes were an American garage rock band from Cincinnati, Ohio, formed in 1996 by vocalist/guitarist Craig Fox, bass guitarist Jack Lawrence and drummer Patrick Keeler. They released their debut album Gun For You in 1999, followed by a self-titled album in 2001. A third studio album, Dual Mono, was released in 2002, with the band taking a small hiatus. The Greenhornes returned in 2005 to release a new EP, East Grand Blues, and a compilation album, Sewed Soles. During this time, Lawrence and Keeler formed The Raconteurs with Detroit musicians and personal friends Jack White and Brendan Benson, leaving very few performances and interaction with Fox. In 2010, the band reunited once again to record a studio album, Four Stars, their first in eight years.

== Biography ==
The Greenhornes started life as a high school band based in Dearborn County, Indiana, (20 miles west of Cincinnati) called Us and Them, self-releasing a four-track tape. Originally a five-piece that included guitarist Brian Olive (who later departed to play with the Toledo-based Soledad Brothers under the alias Oliver Henry) and keyboardist Jared McKinney, The Greenhornes debuted in 1998, issuing their first bit of music on a single, "The End of the Night" backed with "No More," released by Deary Me Records. The following year they released their first full-length album, Gun For You. A self-titled LP followed in 2001. 2002's Dual Mono came after the departure of Olive and McKinney and included guitarist and vocalist Eric Stein, currently guitarist and vocalist of The Griefs. By 2003, the band was down to Fox, Lawrence, and Keeler. 2005 saw the release of East Grand Blues, an EP for V2 Records, which was produced by Detroit musician Brendan Benson. It was quickly followed by the compilation Sewed Soles. The band's collaboration with Holly Golightly, "There Is an End", was the theme song of Jim Jarmusch's 2005 film, Broken Flowers.

Throughout their career, the Greenhornes have toured almost constantly, only taking breaks when the musicians have worked on other projects.

Lawrence and Keeler, along with Detroit musician and producer Dave Feeny, were in the Do-Whaters, the band formed and led by Jack White of The White Stripes for Loretta Lynn's 2004 album Van Lear Rose. Lawrence and Keeler spent all of 2006 at work in The Raconteurs with Benson and White. Lawrence is also the banjo and autoharp player for the Detroit band Blanche, which also includes Feeny, and plays bass in The Dead Weather, a band that includes Alison Mosshart (The Kills), Jack White and Dean Fertita (The Waxwings). Recently, Fox, McKinney, and Olive have been playing together in a new, still-untitled band in and around Cincinnati.

The song "Can't Stand It" was featured in the episode Pie-O-My during season 4 of The Sopranos. The Greenhornes have also contributed the song "Pattern Skies" to the PS2/Xbox video game Destroy All Humans! 2. The group are confirmed to play the ATP New York 2010 music festival in Monticello, New York, in September 2010 at the request of film director Jim Jarmusch.

Four Stars, the band's fourth studio album was released on November 9, 2010. It had the song "Saying Goodbye" on the soundtrack for the 2011 movie "The Green Hornet"

A seven-song 12" record of demos and outtakes from the recording of the East Grand Blues EP was released as a part of the vault package no. 6 from Third Man Records. This album is not available for purchase in stores, and only a limited number of pressings were made.

== Members ==
- Craig Fox - lead vocals, guitar (1996–2012)
- Jack Lawrence - bass guitar (1996–2012)
- Patrick Keeler - drums, percussion (1996–2012)

Touring members

- Mark Watrous – keyboards, guitar, vocals (2010)

Former members

- Brian Olive - guitars (1996–2000)
- Jared McKinney - keyboards (1996–2001)
- Eric Stein - guitars (2000–2002)

== Discography ==
Studio albums

- Gun for You (1999)
- The Greenhornes (2001)
- Dual Mono (2002)
- Four Stars (2010)

Extended plays

- East Grand Blues EP (2005)
- Eric Burdon & The Greenhornes (2012)

Compilations

- Sewed Soles (2005)

Demos/Outtakes albums

- Boscobel Blues (2010)
