= Sewed Soles =

Compilation album by Greenhornes
- Released: November 29, 2005
- Genre: Rock
- Length: 68:09
- Label: V2
- Producer: Jack White, Brendan Benson

Greenhornes chronology
East Grand Blues (2005)	Sewed Soles (2005)	Four Stars (2010)

Professional ratings
Review scores
Source	Rating
Allmusic	3.5/5 stars

Sewed Soles is a compilation album from the rock band The Greenhornes. It was released in November 2005. It consists of old recordings of songs from their previous albums, including their East Grand Blues EP as well as original tracks.

== Track listing ==
All tracks are written by Craig Fox, Jack Lawrence, Patrick Keeler

No.	Title	Length
1.	"It's Not Real"	3:32
2.	"Pattern Skies"	2:13
3.	"Lies"	3:16
4.	"I've Been Down"	5:16
5.	"Hold Me"	3:50
6.	"Shadow of Grief"	2:21
7.	"No More"	2:23
8.	"There is an End"	3:06
9.	"Shame & Misery"	3:29
10.	"Can't Stand It (Alternate Version)"	3:19
11.	"Good Times"	2:12
12.	"Too Much Sorrow"	4:07
13.	"Don't Come Running to Me"	3:29
14.	"Satisfy My Mind"	2:49
15.	"It Returns"	2:48
16.	"Stay Away Girl"	3:38
17.	"Shelter of Your Arms"	4:51
18.	"The End of the Night"	1:50
19.	"Lovin' in the Sun (Alternate Version)"	9:43
Total length:		68:02

== Music video ==
A low budget music video was produced for "There Is An End." The video featured the British singer-songwriter Holly Golightly.
