= Consolers of the Lonely =

Studio album by the Raconteurs
- Released: March 25, 2008
- Recorded: April 2007, February 2008
- Studio: Blackbird (Berry Hill, Tennessee)
- Genre: Alternative rock; blues rock; country rock; power pop; garage rock
- Length: 55:30
- Label: Third Man; Warner Bros.
- Producer: Brendan Benson; Jack White

The Raconteurs chronology
Broken Boy Soldiers (2006)	Consolers of the Lonely (2008)	Help Us Stranger (2019)

Singles from Consolers of the Lonely
- 1. "Salute Your Solution" Released: March 25, 2008; 2. "Many Shades of Black" Released: August 25, 2008; 3. "Old Enough" Released: October 21, 2008; 4. "Consoler of the Lonely" Released: 2008

Consolers of the Lonely is the second studio album by American rock band the Raconteurs. It was released on March 25, 2008, on Warner Bros. Records in most parts of the world, and a day earlier on XL Recordings in the UK.

The band did not do any promotion before the album's release, and its existence was only confirmed a week before. Even so, the record was accidentally leaked by iTunes, and some fans managed to purchase the album early. It is available on CD, vinyl, and MP3. A video for the first single from the album, "Salute Your Solution" was released on the same day. The album earned a nomination for Best Rock Album at the 51st Grammy Awards.

== Background ==
The band premiered "Five on the Five" during their last tour.

The title of the record comes from the inscription in the side of a Washington, D.C. post office written by Charles William Eliot, which reads in full:

Messenger of sympathy and love, servant of parted friends, consoler of the lonely, bond of the scattered family, enlarger of the common life.

== Album cover ==
The stage portrayed on the cover of the album depicts three signs for Tennessee, Michigan, and Ohio. These signs refer to the fact that the band members currently reside in Tennessee, but Brendan Benson and Jack White are originally from Michigan, while Patrick Keeler and Jack Lawrence are originally from Ohio. The second fold depicts the band on stage with a woman exiting from a door in the back. It also has a sign that says "The Raconteurs" and another that says the album's title, Consolers of the Lonely. The full reveal shows the empty stage and the bass drum in the back says "Sanitary Workers Band".

== Release ==
According to the band, the album was finished during the first week in March and was released less than three weeks later. For a band of their stature, the release of Consolers of the Lonely with no promotion was highly unorthodox. Music critics and commentators largely saw it as a way to eschew critics and deal directly with fans. The Observer called it "one of the most exciting musical events of 2008." Despite the already rapid release time and efforts to secure the date, the record was briefly available for purchase on iTunes Friday, March 21.

A bluegrass version of "Old Enough" featuring Ricky Skaggs on mandolin and Ashley Monroe on vocals was recorded during a special live studio session. This version was nominated for the Country Music Association Award for Musical Event of the Year.

== Critical response ==
Professional ratings
Aggregate scores
Source	Rating
Metacritic	75/100
Review scores
Source	Rating
AllMusic	4/5 stars
The A.V. Club	B−
Entertainment Weekly	B+
The Guardian	4/5 stars
The Independent	4/5 stars
NME	7/10
Pitchfork	7.4/10
Rolling Stone	3.5/5 stars
Spin	3/5 stars
Uncut	4/5 stars

Critique of Consolers of the Lonely was mostly positive; much of it centered on the chaotic sound and diverse nature of the album as well as its resemblance to albums by Led Zeppelin and the Who. According to The Toronto Star, "White's bent Americana and Benson's British invasion-isms yields wonderfully unpredictable results". Kitty Empire of The Observer called the album "lively" and said it "finds [the Raconteurs] luxuriating in fancy stuff with kid-in-a-sweetshop enthusiasm. Minimalism is out, bombast is in; the detail, is, as ever, lip-smacking." Commenting on the band's chemistry and freeness, Rolling Stone said the album is "a blissfully stoned conversation between White and Benson about their favorite bands: Led Zeppelin, the Who, Badfinger", though it added, "that freedom is not always satisfying." Austin-American Statesmen said "it's a weirdly overblown and curiously dull album," and complained about its production. The New York Times echoed those statements about the "chaos" of the album, but concluded that "that desperation only makes the crunch of the music more euphoric." The Guardian found that on Consolers of the Lonely, the Raconteurs "establish a firm, emotionally charged identity of their own" and called the effort "flawed but ragged glory." Allmusic concluded that the album is a "lop-sided, bottom-loaded album that's better and richer than their debut."

The album was nominated for Best Rock Album and won Best Engineered Album, Non-Classical at the 51st Grammy Awards. The album ranked No. 44 on Rolling Stone's year-end critic's list and No. 35 on Spin Magazine's year-end Top 40 albums. The album was ranked the No. 4 Album of the Decade by Glide Magazine.

== Grammy Awards ==
Awards and nominations for Consolers of the Lonely
Year	Nominee / work	Award	Result
2009	Consolers of the Lonely	Best Rock Album	Nominated
2009	Consolers of the Lonely	Best Engineered Non-Classical Album	Won

== Commercial performance ==
The album debuted at No. 7 on the U.S. Billboard 200 chart, selling about 42,000 copies in its first week. It debuted at No. 8 on the UK Album Chart, No. 4 on the Canadian Album Chart, and No. 50 on the Australian ARIA chart on April 7, 2008, based on digital downloads. However, the CD was released on April 5, thus allowing the album the next week to ascend 32 places to reach its peak position thus far of No. 18 due to physical sales.

== Track listing ==
All songs by Brendan Benson and Jack White, except "Rich Kid Blues" by Terry Reid.

No.	Title	Length
1.	"Consoler of the Lonely"	3:26
2.	"Salute Your Solution"	3:00
3.	"You Don't Understand Me"	4:53
4.	"Old Enough"	3:58
5.	"The Switch and the Spur"	4:24
6.	"Hold Up"	3:27
7.	"Top Yourself"	4:26
8.	"Many Shades of Black"	4:25
9.	"Five on the Five"	3:33
10.	"Attention"	3:40
11.	"Pull This Blanket Off"	1:59
12.	"Rich Kid Blues"	4:34
13.	"These Stones Will Shout"	3:54
14.	"Carolina Drama"	5:55
Total length:		55:30

Tenth anniversary Third Man Records Vault edition bonus 7"
No.	Title	Length
1.	"Sunday Driver"	3:39
2.	"Now That You're Gone"	3:56

== Personnel ==
=== The Raconteurs ===
- Patrick Keeler – drums, percussion
- Brendan Benson – vocals, guitar
- Jack White III – vocals, guitar, stylophone, piano, organ
- Jack L.J. Lawrence – bass guitar, banjo, backing vocals

=== Additional musicians ===
- Dean Fertita – clavinet
- Dirk Powell – strings
- The Memphis Horns – horns
- Flory Dory Girls – backing vocals
- Frozen 140 Swanson (David Swanson of Whirlwind Heat)

=== Production ===
- Jack White III – production, mixing, horn arrangements
- Brendan Benson – production, horn arrangements
- Joe Chiccarelli – engineering
- Vance Powell – mix down engineering
- Lowell Reynolds – assistant engineering
- Vlado Meller – mastering
- Mark Santangello – assistant
- The Raconteurs – song arrangements
- Wayne Jackson – horn arrangements

== Charts ==
=== Weekly charts ===
Weekly chart performance for Consolers of the Lonely
Chart (2008)	Peak position
Australian Albums (ARIA)	18
Austrian Albums (Ö3 Austria)	38
Belgian Albums (Ultratop Flanders)	8
Belgian Albums (Ultratop Wallonia)	58
Canadian Albums (Billboard)	4
Danish Albums (Hitlisten)	19
Dutch Albums (Album Top 100)	29
Finnish Albums (Suomen virallinen lista)	24
French Albums (SNEP)	40
German Albums (Offizielle Top 100)	60
Irish Albums (IRMA)	6
New Zealand Albums (RMNZ)	21
Norwegian Albums (VG-lista)	11
Swiss Albums (Schweizer Hitparade)	25
UK Albums (OCC)	8
US Billboard 200	7

=== Year-end charts ===
Year-end chart performance for Consolers of the Lonely
Chart (2008)	Position
US Billboard 200	190

== Certifications ==
Certifications for Consolers of the Lonely
Region	Certification	Certified units/sales
United Kingdom (BPI)	Gold	100,000^{^}
^{^} Shipments figures based on certification alone.

== Release history ==
Release history and formats for Consolers of the Lonely
Region	Date	Label
United Kingdom	March 24, 2008	XL
United States	March 25, 2008	Warner Bros.
