= Gun for You =

Studio album by the Greenhornes
- Released: 1999
- Recorded: 1997–1998
- Studios: Ultraseude, Cincinnati, Ohio
- Genres: Hard rock, garage rock
- Length: 37:41
- Label: Prince
- Producer: The Greenhornes

The Greenhornes chronology
Gun for You (1999)	The Greenhornes (2001)

Gun for You is the debut album by the American band the Greenhornes, released in 1999.

== Critical reception ==
Professional ratings
Review scores
Source	Rating
AllMusic	3/5 stars

The Cleveland Scene deemed the album "a mix of hard rock and soulful blues that achieves a fine balance between raw emotion and tight playing."

== Track listing ==
All tracks written by the Greenhornes, except where noted.

1. "The End of the Night" - 1:53
2. "No More" - 2:24
3. "Good Times" - 2:13
4. "Wake Me, Shake Me" (Al Kooper) - 3:37
5. "Hold Me" - 3:52
6. "My Baby's Alright" - 2:32
7. "No Friend of Mine" - 3:09
8. "Show Me Love" - 3:34
9. "So Cold" - 3:44
10. "What a Fool" - 3:07
11. "Going to the River" (William York) - 2:50
12. "I've Been Down" - 5:14

== Personnel ==
- Craig Fox - guitars, lead vocals
- Patrick Keeler - drums, percussion, artwork
- Jack Lawrence - bass
- Brian Olive - guitars, vocals
- Jared McKinney - organs, vocals
- Chris Koltay - mixing
- John Curley - engineering
- Dave Davis - mastering
