= The Greenhornes (album) =

Studio album by The Greenhornes
- Released: March 6, 2001
- Recorded: 2000
- Genre: Garage rock revival, blues rock
- Length: 38:04
- Label: Telstar Records
- Producer: John Curley

The Greenhornes chronology
Gun For You (1999)	The Greenhornes (2001)	Dual Mono (2002)

Professional ratings
Review scores
Source	Rating
AllMusic	4/5 stars

The Greenhornes is the second studio album by The Greenhornes.

== Track listing ==
All songs written by The Greenhornes, except where noted.

1. Can't Stand It – 3:21
2. Shadow of Grief - 2:50
3. Stay Away Girl – 3:36
4. Inside Looking Out (A. Lomax, J. Lomax, E. Burdon, B. Chandler) – 3:33
5. It's My Soul (James, Chenier) – 2:59
6. Let Me Be (Daniels) – 2:50
7. Lies – 3:15
8. Nobody Loves You – 3:41
9. Lonely Feeling (B. Olive) – 3:47
10. High Time Baby (Winwood, Davis, Winwood) – 2:57
11. Shame and Misery – 3:31
12. Can't You See – 4:24

== Personnel ==
- Craig Fox - guitars, vocals
- Patrick Keeler - percussion, drums
- Jack Lawrence - bass
- Jared McKinney - keyboard
- Brian Olive - guitar
