= Frozen Charlotte (album) =

Studio album by Jack White
- Released: July 10, 2026
- Studio: Third Man (Nashville)
- Length: 42:36
- Label: Third Man
- Producer: Jack White

Jack White chronology
No Name (2024)	Frozen Charlotte (2026)

Singles from Frozen Charlotte
- 1. "G.O.D. and the Broken Ribs" / "Derecho Demonico" Released: April 3, 2026; 2. "Dollar Bill" Released: June 10, 2026

Frozen Charlotte, also titled Frozen Charlatan, is the seventh studio album by the American rock musician Jack White, released on July 10, 2026 on Third Man Records. Self-produced by White and recorded at Third Man Studio in Nashville, Tennessee, the album was preceded by the singles, "G.O.D. and the Broken Ribs", "Derecho Demonico", and "Dollar Bill".

The album marks the first time White has recorded two consecutive solo albums with the same backing band, with bassist Dominic Davis and drummer Patrick Keeler also contributing to White's previous album, No Name (2024), which featured a similar garage rock aesthetic. Keyboardist and organist Bobby Emmett joined the trio in 2024 for the accompanying tour for No Name, with the four-piece subsequently working on Frozen Charlotte together as a live band.

Released to critical acclaim, the album reached number thirty-two on the Billboard 200, number one on the Billboard Independent Albums Chart and number twenty-nine on the UK Albums Chart.

== Background and recording ==
In July 2024, Jack White surprise-released No Name, a garage rock album recorded with bass guitarist Dominic Davis and drummer Patrick Keeler. The album received widespread critical acclaim and was nominated for Best Rock Album at the 67th Annual Grammy Awards. For the album's accompanying tour, White, Davis and Keeler recruited keyboardist and organist Bobby Emmett, who expanded upon the band's hard rock aesthetic. Davis noted: "He and Jack could really go at it without getting in each other's way, which isn't easy as the keyboard can overpower things. But Bobby is from Detroit and he's from the rock 'n' roll scene, so we have a lot in common." Keeler elaborated, "Bobby's an old friend of mine. He was in a band called The Sights and we played tons of shows together. Jack was looking for a Hammond player and I said I knew one guy and he was better than anybody I knew at it."

With Emmett now in the band, the four-piece embarked on an extensive tour in support of No Name across 2024 and 2025, with the band working on unfinished song ideas from the No Name sessions and improvising new material during soundchecks and live performances: "Sometimes right in the middle of the set, we'd start playing something like "Neighbors Blues". That was born on stage. We went back into the studio and worked up some of those ideas. The tour was a lot of fun to play; there was a lot of improvisation, and when you have several thousand people in a room as you are writing a song, it changes things as you can respond to their emotions."

The band subsequently entered the studio as a four-piece to record a follow-up album to No Name, with Davis stating: "It felt different to No Name because now we had Bobby. We are all huge Deep Purple fans, so that's where this organ-and-guitar thing comes from." Ben Swank, the co-founder of White's label Third Man Records, praised the chemistry of the four-piece band stating: "It's not No Name Pt II. It's a little more classic rock than I've heard [White] do in a while – you can hear some of the jamminess you get from the live band. [...] It's the right line-up at the right time."

== Release ==
On April 3, 2026, White released two singles, "G.O.D. and the Broken Ribs" and "Derecho Demonico", on a limited edition seven-inch single and performed them both live on Saturday Night Live.

Frozen Charlotte was first quietly announced by a listing to pre-order the album on Third Man Records website. It was officially announced the next day, June 10, alongside the release of the third single from the album, "Dollar Bill".

The album was released on July 10, 2026, the same day that White's North America tour in support of the album began.

== Artwork and packaging ==
The album cover features a custom doll sculpture created by White, as part of his exhibition "These Thoughts May Disappear" at London's Newport Street Gallery. The doll is a death's head atop the body of a Frozen Charlotte, a style of penny doll based on a folk ballad about a girl that froze to death.

On the Frozen Charlatan variant of the album, the death's head is white instead of blue.

== Critical reception ==
Professional ratings
Aggregate scores
Source	Rating
AnyDecentMusic?	7.5/10
Metacritic	83/100
Review scores
Source	Rating
Clash	7/10
Consequence	B+
Exclaim!	8/10
The Guardian	3/5 stars
Mojo	4/5 stars
NME	3.5/5 stars
Paste	B+
Pitchfork	7.7/10
Rolling Stone	4/5 stars
Uncut	4.5/5 stars

According to the review aggregator Metacritic, Frozen Charlotte received "universal acclaim" based on a weighted average score of 83 out of 100 from seventeen critic scores. The review aggregator Any Decent Music gave it a weighted average score of 7.5 out of 10 from eighteen critic scores.

== Track listing ==
All tracks are written by Jack White.

No.	Title	Length
1.	"G.O.D. and the Broken Ribs"	3:43
2.	"Derecho Demonico"	3:53
3.	"There's Nobody There"	3:56
4.	"Raising the Grain"	3:06
5.	"You'll Never Fix Me"	3:23
6.	"Nobody Knows"	3:04
7.	"Dollar Bill"	2:42
8.	"I Can't Believe What I'm Hearing"	2:29
9.	"Thick as Thieves"	3:01
10.	"All Alone Again"	3:29
11.	"She's in a Frenzy"	2:23
12.	"Making Contact"	2:23
13.	"Neighbors Blues"	5:04
Total length:		42:36

== Personnel ==
Credits are adapted from Tidal.

- Jack White – vocals, lead guitar, production, mixing
- Bill Skibbe – mixing, mastering
- Dan Mancini – engineering assistance
- Hanford Pittman – engineering assistance
- Shibby Poole – engineering assistance
- Dominic Davis – electric bass guitar
- Patrick Keeler – drums (tracks 1–5, 7–13), percussion (5–7, 11, 12)
- Bobby Emmett – Hammond organ (1–7, 9, 11–13), background vocals (3–8, 12, 13), Mellotron (5), keyboards (8)
- Daru Jones – drums (6)
- Olivia Jean – electric bass guitar (8)
- David James Swanson – percussion (11)

== Charts ==
Chart performance for Frozen Charlotte
Chart (2026)	Peak position
Australian Albums (ARIA)	17
Austrian Albums (Ö3 Austria)	19
Belgian Albums (Ultratop Flanders)	12
Belgian Albums (Ultratop Wallonia)	18
Croatian International Albums (HDU)	3
Dutch Albums (Album Top 100)	27
Finnish Physical Albums (Suomen virallinen lista)	6
French Albums (SNEP)	47
French Rock & Metal Albums (SNEP)	4
German Albums (Offizielle Top 100)	11
German Rock & Metal Albums (Offizielle Top 100)	5
Irish Albums (IRMA)	99
Irish Independent Albums (IRMA)	4
Italian Albums (FIMI)	96
Japanese Download Albums (Billboard Japan)	50
Japanese Rock Albums (Oricon)	7
Japanese Top Albums Sales (Billboard Japan)	52
Japanese Western Albums (Oricon)	21
New Zealand Albums (RMNZ)	13
Polish Albums (ZPAV)	29
Portuguese Albums (AFP)	133
Scottish Albums (Official Charts)	5
Spanish Albums (Promusicae)	94
Swedish Physical Albums (Sverigetopplistan)	7
Swiss Albums (Schweizer Hitparade)	6
UK Albums (Official Charts)	29
UK Americana Albums (Official Charts)	2
UK Independent Albums (Official Charts)	1
US Billboard 200	32
US Independent Albums (Billboard)	3
US Top Rock & Alternative Albums (Billboard)	7
