= Dual Mono =

Studio album by The Greenhornes
- Released: October 15, 2002
- Recorded: 2001 at Ultrasuede Studios, Cincinnati, Ohio.
- Genre: Garage rock, blues-rock
- Label: Telstar Records
- Producer: The Greenhornes

The Greenhornes chronology
| The Greenhornes (2001) | Dual Mono (2002) | East Grand Blues (2005) |

Professional ratings
Review scores
| Source | Rating |
|---|---|
| AllMusic | 4.5/5 stars |

Dual Mono is the third studio album by The Greenhornes, released on October 15, 2002. It consists of 12 songs, 11 of which were written by the Greenhornes, and one by Bob Wackett. It received a positive review from AllMusic, garnering 4.5 stars out of 5.

== Track listing ==
All songs by The Greenhornes, except where noted.

1. "Satisfy My Mind"
2. "The Way It's Meant to Be"
3. "Three Faint Calls"
4. "It Returns"
5. "Hard Times"
6. "Too Much Sorrow"
7. "You'll Be Sorry"
8. "There Is An End"
9. "It's Not Real"
10. "Don't Come Running to Me"
11. "Pigtails and Kneesocks"
12. "Gonna Get Me Someone" (Bob Wackett)

== Personnel ==
The Greenhornes

- Craig Fox - vocals, guitar, piano, percussion
- Eric Stein - vocals, guitar, harpsichord, percussion
- Patrick Keeler - harmonica, Clavinet, drums, percussion
- Jack Lawrence - harpsichord, bass, percussion, background vocals

Guest musicians

- Holly Golightly - vocals on "Gonna Get Me Someone" and "There is an End".
