= East Grand Blues =

EP by The Greenhornes
- Released: August 2, 2005
- Genre: Garage rock
- Length: 14:42
- Label: V2

The Greenhornes chronology
Dual Mono (2002)	East Grand Blues (2005)	Sewed Soles (2005)

East Grand Blues (also released as Pattern Skies) is an EP by The Greenhornes.

Professional ratings
Review scores
Source	Rating
Allmusic	link

== Track listing ==
1. "I'm Going Away" – 2:55
2. "Shelter of Your Arms" – 4:51
3. "At Night" – 2:24
4. "Pattern Skies" – 2:14
5. "Shine Like the Sun" – 2:18

== Personnel ==
- Craig Fox - vocals, guitars
- Patrick Keeler - drums, percussion
- Jack Lawrence - bass
