= The Raconteurs =

American rock supergroup

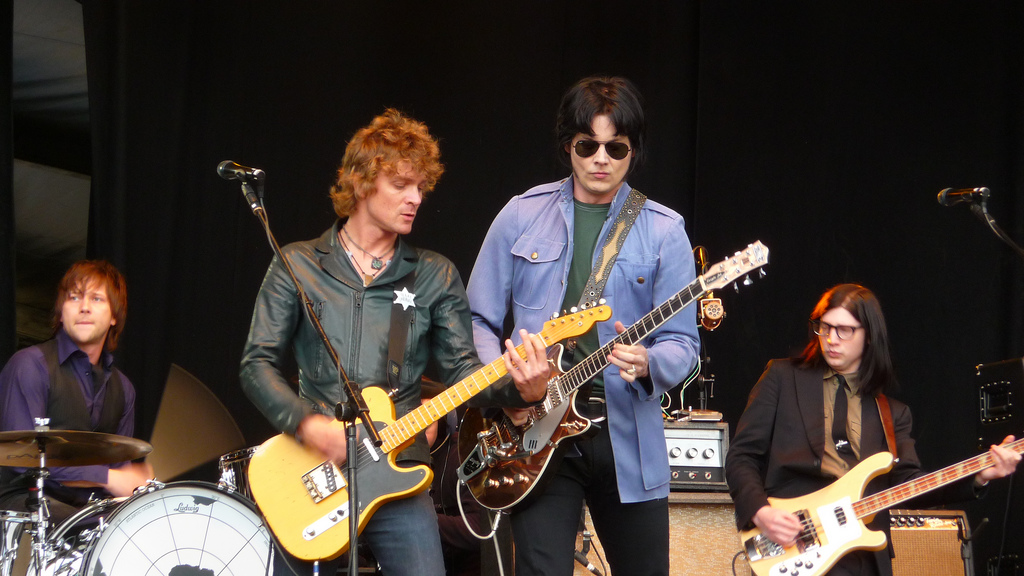
- The Raconteurs performing at T in the Park, July 2008. Left to right: Patrick Keeler, Brendan Benson, Jack White, and Jack Lawrence.

Background information
- Also known as: The Saboteurs (Australia)
- Origin: Detroit, Michigan, U.S.
- Genres: Alternative rock; garage rock; blues rock; indie rock
- Years active: 2005–2014, 2018–present
- Labels: Third Man; Warner; XL; V2
- Spinoffs: The Dead Weather
- Spinoff of: The Greenhornes, The White Stripes
- Members: Jack White; Patrick Keeler; Jack Lawrence; Brendan Benson
- Website: theraconteurs.com

The Raconteurs (/ˌrækɒnˈtɜːrz/, also known as The Saboteurs in Australia) are an American rock band from Detroit, Michigan, formed in 2005. The band consists of Jack White (vocals, guitar), Brendan Benson (vocals, guitar), Jack Lawrence (bass guitar), and Patrick Keeler (drums). Lawrence and Keeler were originally members of the Greenhornes, while White and Lawrence went on to become members of the Dead Weather.

== History ==
The band is based in Nashville, Tennessee. According to the band's official website, "The seed was sown in an attic in the middle of a hot summer when friends Jack White and Brendan Benson got together and wrote a song that truly inspired them. This song was 'Steady, As She Goes' and the inspiration led to the creation of a full band with the addition of Lawrence and Keeler." The band came together in Detroit during 2005 and recorded when time allowed for the remainder of the year. Due to the various members' success in other bands, they were quickly dubbed a supergroup. The band, however, asserted they were not, saying that the term implies something pre-planned or temporary, whereas they are actually "a new band made up of old friends."

The band are known as "The Saboteurs" in the Australian market, due to a Queensland band already using the name "Raconteurs". The Queensland band refused to give up their name for the amount of money they were offered, and instead asked for a higher price from the Raconteurs' record company, who refused to pay the greater amount. A member of the Queensland band said that they had not been informed of who was trying to buy their name and asked for the larger sum of money to see what would happen.

The band has played a number of music festivals in Europe, Asia, and North America (including Oxegen in Ireland; Reading Festival, Leeds Festival, Glastonbury Festival, and T in the Park in the United Kingdom; Heineken Open'er Festival in Poland; Vegoose in Las Vegas; Lollapalooza in Chicago; Bonnaroo in Manchester, Tennessee; Austin City Limits Music Festival in Austin, Texas; Coachella in Indio, California; and Orlando Calling in Orlando, Florida), headlining many.

=== 2005–2007: Broken Boy Soldiers ===
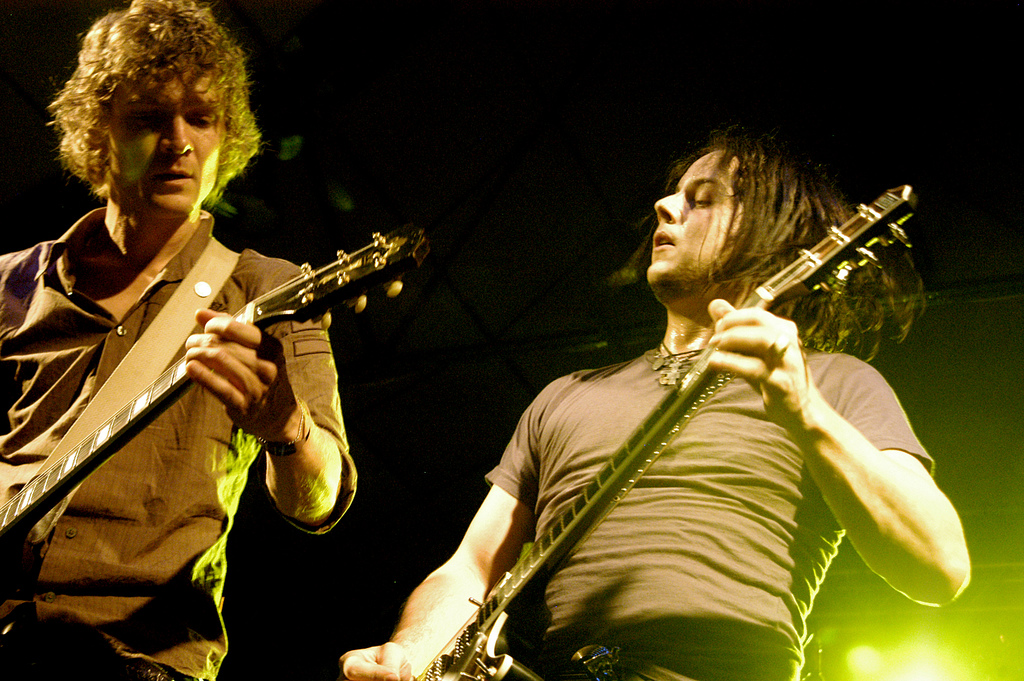
Brendan Benson and Jack White, of the Raconteurs in Stockholm, 2006

The Raconteurs' full-length debut, Broken Boy Soldiers, was recorded at Brendan Benson's in-home studio located in Detroit. The first single was "Steady, As She Goes/Store Bought Bones" and was released as a limited-edition 7-inch, 45 rpm vinyl record in Europe on January 30, 2006, and in North America on March 7, 2006. A CD version of "Steady, As She Goes" was released on April 24, 2006, with the B-side "Bane Rendition."

The Raconteurs first performed live at the academy in Liverpool, UK, on March 20, 2006, launching a short British tour. Their first American date was the following month, on April 20, at New York City's Irving Plaza. Nearly nonstop touring followed, bringing the band to audiences around North America and Europe. The high profile of Jack White meant that even though the band was new, they were able to sell out mid-sized venues—a rarity for a band's first tour.

Broken Boy Soldiers was released on May 15, 2006, in the UK on Third Man Recordings/XL Recordings and May 16 in the U.S. on Third Man Recordings/V2 Records. It entered the UK charts at No. 2 and the U.S. charts at No. 7.

In November 2006, the Raconteurs played eight dates as the opening act for Bob Dylan on the Northeastern leg of his U.S. tour. On November 3, 2006, the Raconteurs performed the song "Store Bought Bones" and the title track, "Broken Boy Soldier" on Later with Jools Holland. According to Planet Sound (who had reporters in attendance), during "Store Bought Bones," White's guitar malfunctioned and they had to re-play the song. This eventually happened four times, with the band breaking up in laughter by the fourth take. The TV airing used edited pieces from all four performances and cut out any laughter. The band's cover of "Teenage Kicks" by The Undertones appeared on a 40-year anniversary of the BBC live compilation. They played it live on a John Peel tribute.

The band has performed a number of covers during live shows. For instance, the set list usually includes renditions of "Bang Bang (My Baby Shot Me Down)" (a song written by Sonny Bono and popularized by both Cher and Nancy Sinatra) and "Headin' for the Texas Border" by The Flamin' Groovies. Other songs the band has covered include Gnarls Barkley's "Crazy," Bo Diddley's "Who Do You Love?," Ron Davies' "It Ain't Easy," Love's "A House Is Not a Motel", and Charley Jordan's "Keep It Clean." The band has also covered the song "Floating" by the Irish band Jape, and "Send Me a Postcard", by Dutch band Shocking Blue. They have also performed an old Blues song written by Big Joe Williams in 1935 (popularized by Van Morrison's "Them" in 1964), "Baby, Please Don't Go."

In December 2006, the band's debut album, Broken Boy Soldiers, was awarded the title Album of the Year by Britain's Mojo magazine. In 2007, the album was nominated for the Grammy Award for Best Rock Album. The Raconteurs were nominated for two awards at the 49th Annual Grammys: one for Best Rock Album for Broken Boy Soldiers, and another for Best Rock Performance by a Duo or Group with Vocal for "Steady, As She Goes" although they did not win in either category. The intro and ending of "Steady, As She Goes" is often used to play out Saturday Live, a long running radio programme on BBC Radio 4.

The band recorded a cover of the Undertones' "Teenage Kicks" for the album Radio 1: Established 1967, a 2007 compilation album of cover versions celebrating the fortieth anniversary of BBC Radio 1, a song noted to be a favourite of the influential late Radio 1 DJ John Peel. the Raconteurs are also the only act on the album to have covered a song and have one of their own songs covered, with British R&B singer Corinne Bailey Rae (of "Put Your Records On" fame), having covered the band's debut single "Steady, As She Goes" as the album's closing track.

=== 2008–2009: Consolers of the Lonely ===
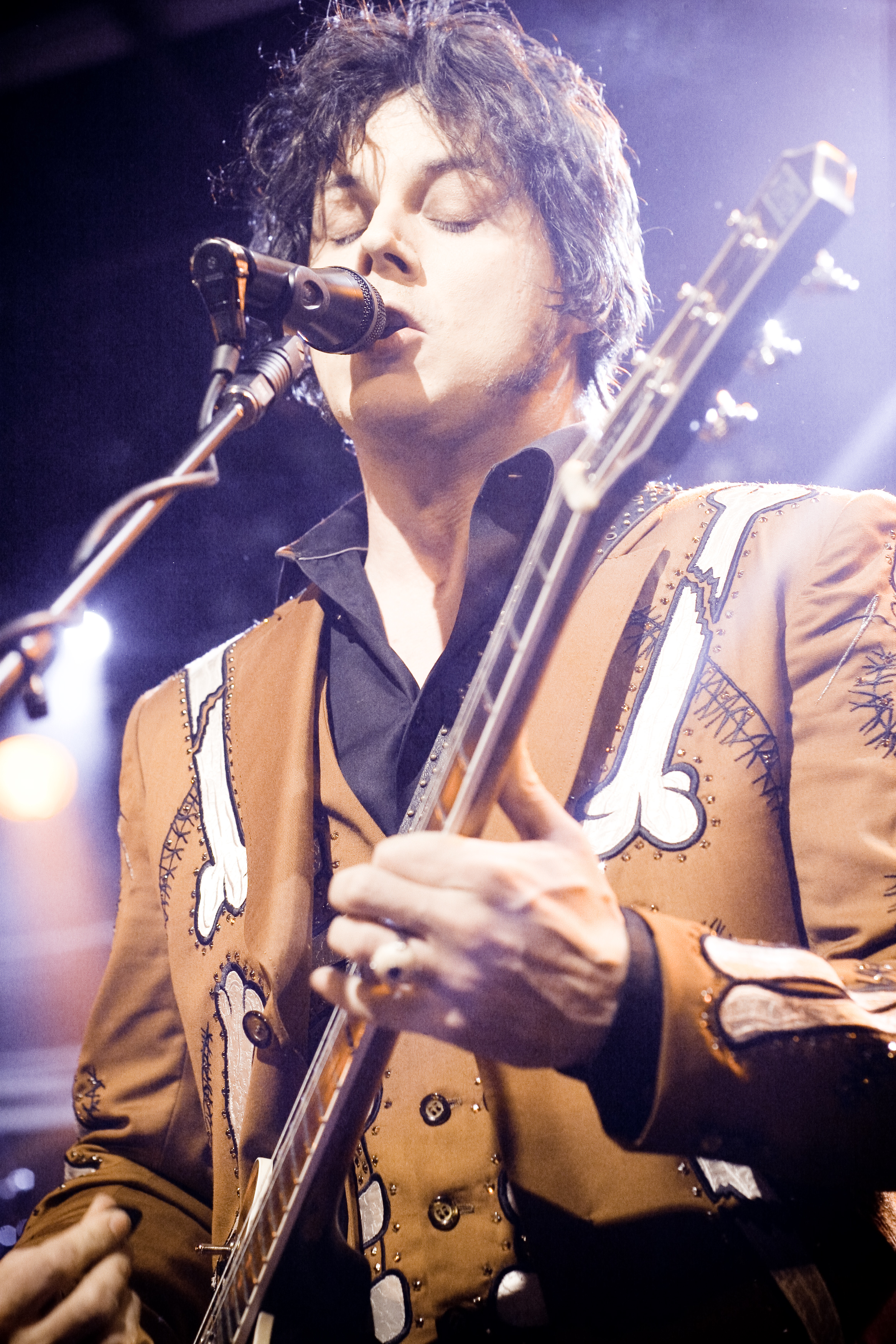
Jack White performing with the band in 2008

The Raconteurs released their second album, Consolers of the Lonely, on March 25, 2008. The first single, "Salute Your Solution", was released the same day.

The band also played tour dates including: Coachella on April 25, the New Orleans Jazz & Heritage Festival on May 4, Bonnaroo on June 13, T in the Park in Scotland on July 12, Oxegen festival in Ireland on July 13 and The Open'er Festival in Poland on July 4. They played at "The Pyramid Stage" at the Glastonbury Festival 2008 on June 28, the Montreux Jazz festival on July 7, at Lollapalooza on August 1, and on the main stage of Reading and Leeds Festival 2008 on August 23 and 24, as well as at the Austin City Limits Music Festival on September 26–28, 2008. They played "The Eden Sessions" at the Eden Project in Cornwall on June 29. The band also toured the U.S. during summer 2008. In 2009, Consolers of the Lonely was nominated for the Grammy Award for Best Rock Album but lost to Coldplay's album Viva La Vida, or Death and All His Friends. The band, however, did win the Grammy Award for Best Engineered Album, Non-Classical.

=== 2010–2018: Dormancy and recording hiatus ===
In an interview in February 2010, Brendan Benson stated that the future of The Raconteurs was ambiguous, stating "I think we're all just really focused on other things." He went on to add that "it will come around and we'll get together again and hang out and maybe make a record or maybe not." On April 17, 2010, Benson and Keeler performed Raconteurs songs as The Racontwoers at Jack White's Third Man Records venue to coincide with a repressing of Broken Boy Soldiers on copper-colored vinyl. The pair was accompanied by Mark Watrous and Andrew Higley. The band played at the MI Fest on September 17, 2011, as well as September 15 at the Ryman Auditorium in Nashville, Tennessee. On November 12, 2011, the band played the inaugural Orlando Calling festival in Orlando, Fl. The Raconteurs announced an additional American show to play at The Tabernacle in Atlanta, Georgia on November 13, 2011. In April 2012, Third Man Records released two songs that were supposed to appear on Consolers of the Lonely: "Open Your Eyes" and "You Make a Fool Out of Me". The songs were re-recorded for Brendan Benson's next solo album 'My Old, Familiar Friend'. In February 2013, Jack White announced that the band was back in the studio recording new music. In March 2014, in an interview in The Guardian newspaper, Brendan Benson announced that a new album was "kind of off the table", suggesting that a new album was not currently in the works, and that the band's hiatus was more like a split.

Benson and Lawrence joined White onstage during the encore of his January 28, 2015 concert at the Bridgestone Arena in Nashville, TN. They played "Salute Your Solution" and "Steady, As She Goes". Keeler was unable to join since he was on tour with The Afghan Whigs at the time.

=== 2018–present: Help Us Stranger ===
On October 8, 2018, Third Man Records announced a deluxe reissue of Consolers of the Lonely through the label's Vault quarterly subscription service would feature two newly recorded songs, "Sunday Driver" and "Now That You're Gone", on an accompanied 7-inch vinyl. Both songs were made available digitally on December 19 and subsequently were included on the 2019 album Help Us Stranger. The album was released on June 21, 2019.

Help Us Stranger was recorded at Third Man Studio in Nashville. White and Benson wrote all songs except for a cover of "Hey Gyp (Dig The Slowness)", by Donovan. The album was produced by The Raconteurs and engineered by Joshua V. Smith. Musical collaborators included Dean Fertita of The Dead Weather and Queens of the Stone Age and Lillie Mae and Scarlett Rische of Jypsi. The album was mixed by Vance Powell and The Raconteurs at Blackbird Studio in Nashville.

The band announced plans for a live album entitled Live in Tulsa, which was recorded live at Cain's Ballroom in Tulsa, Oklahoma from October 13, 2019, through October 16, 2019.

In May 2020, the band released their Live at Electric Lady EP and documentary via Spotify. The documentary features a studio cover of the Richard Hell & the Voidoids classic “Blank Generation” as well as the full concert in studio A.

In October 2026, the Raconteurs released the 20-year anniversary of Broken Boy Soldiers, showing new content, including a record of the first show the band ever played in Liverpool, and demos and outttakes on the album. One week later, Brendan Benson, Jack Lawrence, and Patrick Keeler joined Jack White on stage for the encore of a show he was playing in Nashville, Tenesee as part of his Frozen Charlotte tour. The band played five songs: Steady, as She Goes, Hands, [[Broken Boy Soldiers]|Level]], Broken Boy Soldier, and Carolina Drama.

== Band members ==
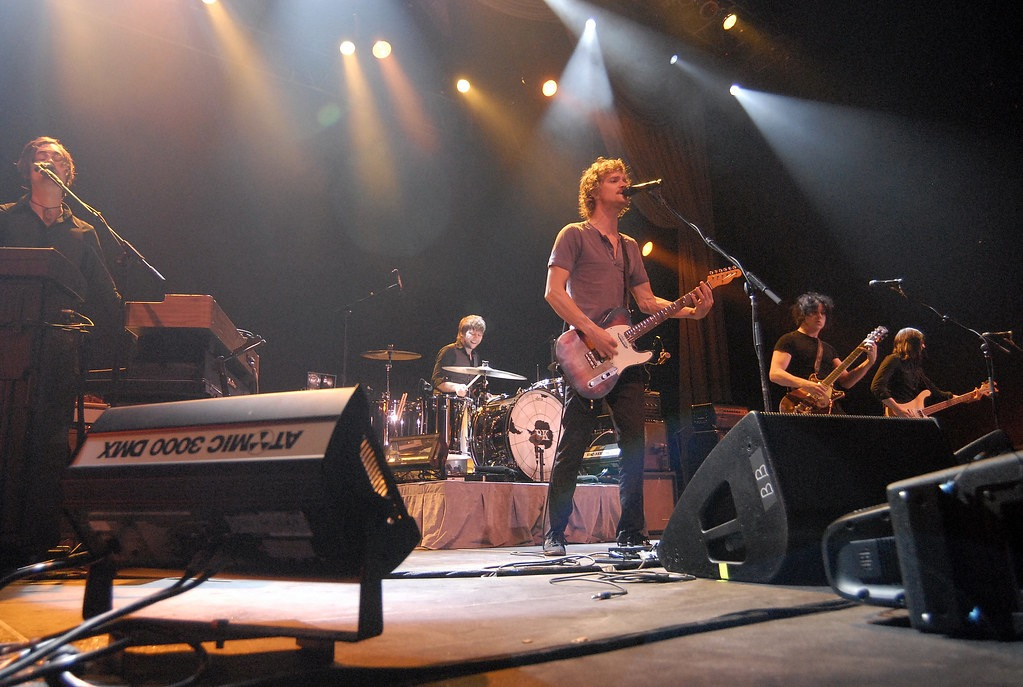
Raconteurs play in 2008 in Seattle.

Current members

- Brendan Benson – vocals, guitars, keyboards, organ, piano
- Patrick Keeler – drums, percussion, backing vocals
- Jack Lawrence – bass guitar, banjo, backing vocals
- Jack White – vocals, guitars, keyboards, organ, piano, stylophone, mandolin, production

Touring members

- Dean Fertita – keyboards, percussion, guitar, backing vocals (2006; 2011; 2019–present)
- Mark Watrous – keyboards, fiddle, percussion, violin, vocals (2008)

== Discography ==
=== Studio albums ===
Title	Details	Peak chart positions										Sales	Certifications (sales threshold)
Title	Details	US	AUS	BEL (FL)	CAN	FIN	IRL	NOR	NZ	SWI	UK	Sales	Certifications (sales threshold)
Broken Boy Soldiers	Release date: May 16, 2006; Label: Third Man, XL, V2; Formats: CD, download, LP, cassette	7	14	8	15	34	4	8	12	9	2	US: 522,000	BPI: Gold
Consolers of the Lonely	Release date: March 25, 2008; Label: Third Man, Warner Bros.; Formats: CD, download, LP	7	18	4	8	24	6	11	21	25	8	US: 288,000	BPI: Gold
Help Us Stranger	Release date: June 21, 2019; Label: Third Man; Formats: CD, download, LP, cassette	1	23	8	2	—	24	—	38	6	8		
"—" denotes releases that did not chart

=== Singles ===
Title	Year	Peak chart positions										Certifications	Album
Title	Year	US	US Rock	AUS	BEL (FL)	CAN	DEN	FIN	NZ	SCO	UK	Certifications	Album
"Steady, As She Goes"	2006	54	— (Note: "Steady, As She Goes" did not enter the Hot Rock & Alternative Songs chart, but peaked at number one on the Alternative Airplay chart.)	47	55	— (Note: "Steady, As She Goes" did not enter the Billboard Canadian Hot 100, but peaked at number 37 on the Canadian All-format Airplay chart.)	4	16	22	4	4	BPI: Gold	Broken Boy Soldiers
"Hands"	2006	—	—	—	—	—	14	—	—	16	29		Broken Boy Soldiers
"Broken Boy Soldier"	2006	— (Note: "Broken Boy Soldier" did not enter the Billboard Hot 100, but peaked at number 27 on the Hot Singles Sales chart.)	—	—	—	—	19	—	—	19	22		Broken Boy Soldiers
"Level"	2007	—	— (Note: "Level" did not enter the Hot Rock & Alternative Songs chart, but peaked at number seven on the Alternative Airplay chart.)	—	—	—	—	—	—	—	—		Broken Boy Soldiers
"Salute Your Solution"	2008	— (Note: "Salute Your Solution" did not enter the Billboard Hot 100, but peaked at number 26 on the Hot Singles Sales chart.)	— (Note: "Salute Your Solution" did not enter the Hot Rock & Alternative Songs chart, but peaked at number four on the Alternative Airplay chart.)	—	—	79	—	—	—	—	—		Consolers of the Lonely
"Many Shades of Black"	2008	—	— (Note: "Many Shades of Black" did not enter the Hot Rock & Alternative Songs chart, but peaked at number 37 on the Alternative Airplay chart.)	—	64	—	—	—	—	—	—		Consolers of the Lonely
"Old Enough"	2008	— (Note: "Old Enough" did not enter the Billboard Hot 100, but peaked at number 16 on the Hot Singles Sales chart.)	— (Note: "Old Enough" did not enter the Hot Rock & Alternative Songs chart, but peaked at number seven on the Adult Alternative Airplay chart.)	—	—	—	—	—	—	55	— (Note: "Old Enough" did not enter the UK Singles Chart, but peaked at number 78 on the UK Physical Singles Chart.)		Consolers of the Lonely
"Consoler of the Lonely"	2008	—	—	—	—	—	—	—	—	—	—		Consolers of the Lonely
"Sunday Driver"/ "Now That You're Gone"	2018	—	49	—	— (Note: "Sunday Driver" did not enter the Flanders Ultratop 50, but charted as an "extra tip" on the Ultratip chart.)	—	—	—	—	—	—		Help Us Stranger
"Sunday Driver"/ "Now That You're Gone"	2018	—	— (Note: "Now That You're Gone" did not enter the Hot Rock & Alternative Songs chart, but peaked at number 28 on the Alternative Airplay chart.)	—	— (Note: "Now That You're Gone" did not enter the Flanders Ultratop 50, but charted as an "extra tip" on the Ultratip chart.)	—	—	—	—	—	—		Help Us Stranger
"Hey Gyp (Dig the Slowness)"	2019	—	—	—	—	—	—	—	—	—	—		Help Us Stranger
"Help Me Stranger"	2019	—	33	—	73	—	—	—	—	—	—		Help Us Stranger
"Bored and Razed"	2019	—	49	—	—	—	—	—	—	—	—		Help Us Stranger
"Somedays (I Don't Feel Like Trying)"	2019	—	— (Note: "Somedays (I Don't Feel Like Trying)" did not enter the Hot Rock & Alternative Songs chart, but peaked at number 31 on the Adult Alternative Airplay chart.)	—	—	—	—	—	—	—	—		Help Us Stranger
"—" denotes releases that did not chart

=== Other charted songs ===
Title	Year	Peak chart positions			Album
Title	Year	MEX Air.	UK	UK Indie	Album
"Store Bought Bones"	2008	—	—	40	Broken Boy Soldiers
"You Don't Understand Me"	2008	—	150	—	Consolers of the Lonely
"Carolina Drama" (acoustic mix)	2016	36	—	—	Acoustic Recordings 1998–2016
"—" denotes releases that did not chart

=== Live recordings ===
Year	Title	Medium	Label
2006	Live at the Manchester Apollo	Vinyl	Third Man Records
2011	Live at Third Man Records	Vinyl	Third Man Records
2012	Live at Montreux 2008	DVD / Blu-ray	EagleVision
2013	Live at the Ryman Auditorium September 15, 2011	Vinyl / DVD	Third Man Records
2017	Live at Irving Plaza NYC	Vinyl	Third Man Records
2020	Live in Tulsa	Vinyl	Third Man Records
2020	Live at Electric Lady	Vinyl / streaming	Third Man Records

=== Other contributions ===
Year	Song	Album
2007	"Steady, As She Goes"	The Saturday Sessions: The Dermot O'Leary Show

=== Music videos ===
Year	Song	Director
2006	"Steady, As She Goes" (version 1)	Jim Jarmusch
2006	"Steady, As She Goes" (version 2)	The Malloys
2006	"Hands"	Roman Bloomsburg
2006	"Broken Boy Soldier"	Floria Sigismondi
2007	"Level" (Live)	Sophie Muller
2008	"Salute Your Solution"	Autumn De Wilde
2008	"Old Enough"	Autumn De Wilde
2018	"Sunday Driver"	Steven Sebring
2018	"Now That You're Gone"	Dikayl Rimmasch
2019	"Help Me Stranger"	Yasuhiko Shimizu
2019	"Somedays (I Don't Feel Like Trying)"	Ben Chappell

== Awards and nominations ==
=== Brit Awards ===
Year	Nominee / work	Award	Result
2007	The Raconteurs	International Breakthrough Act	Nominated

=== Country Music Awards ===
Year	Nominee / work	Award	Result
2009	"Old Enough"	Musical Event of the Year	Nominated

=== Grammy Awards ===
Year	Nominee / work	Award	Result
2007	Broken Boy Soldiers	Best Rock Album	Nominated
2007	"Steady, as She Goes"	Best Rock Performance by a Duo or Group with Vocal	Nominated
2009	Consolers of the Lonely	Best Rock Album	Nominated
2009	Consolers of the Lonely	Best Engineered Non-Classical Album	Won

=== Mojo Magazine ===
Year	Nominee / work	Award	Result
2006	Broken Boy Soldiers	Album of the Year	Won

=== MTV Europe Music Awards ===
Year	Nominee / work	Award	Result
2006	The Raconteurs	Best Alternative	Nominated

=== mtvU Woodie Awards ===
Year	Nominee / work	Award	Result
2006	"Steady, As She Goes" video	Best Live Action Video	Nominated
