= KRCW (FM) =

- Royal City, Washington; United States
- Broadcast area: Tri-Cities, Washington
- Frequency: 96.3 MHz
- Branding: La Maquina

Programming
- Format: Regional Mexican

Ownership
- Owner: Bustos Media; (Bustos Media Holdings, LLC)
- Sister stations: KMMG, KZTB

History
- First air date: 1999
- Former call signs: KQVN (1992–1994)
- Call sign meaning: Royal City, Washington

Technical information
- Licensing authority: FCC
- Facility ID: 49731
- Class: C2
- ERP: 19,500 watts
- HAAT: 241 meters (791 ft)
- Transmitter coordinates: 46°45′55″N 119°16′51″W

Links
- Public license information: Public file; LMS
- Webcast: Listen live
- Website: laradiodeaqui.com

KRCW (96.3 FM, La Maquina) is an American radio station licensed to serve the community of Royal City, Washington, since 1999. The station is owned by Bustos Media, through licensee Bustos Media Holdings, LLC.

== Programming ==
KRCW broadcasts a Regional Mexican music format branded as "La Maquina".

== History ==
In March 1992, the Northwest Communities Educational Center applied to the Federal Communications Commission (FCC) for a construction permit for a new broadcast radio station. The FCC granted this permit on October 15, 1992, with a scheduled expiration date of April 15, 1994. The new station was assigned call sign KQVN on December 3, 1992. The station was assigned new call sign KRCW on May 6, 1994.

In November 1997, the Northwest Communities Educational Center reached an agreement to transfer the permit for KRCW to Farmworker Educational Radio Network, Inc. The FCC approved the deal on December 17, 1997, and the transaction was consummated on March 30, 1998. After a series of delays and extensions, construction and testing were completed in September 1999, the station was granted its broadcast license on December 9, 1999.

Effective October 8, 2019, the Cesar Chavez Foundation (parent of licensee Farmworker Educational Radio Network, Inc.) sold KRCW to Bustos Media for $200,000.
