= Patrick Keeler =

American drummer (born 1975)

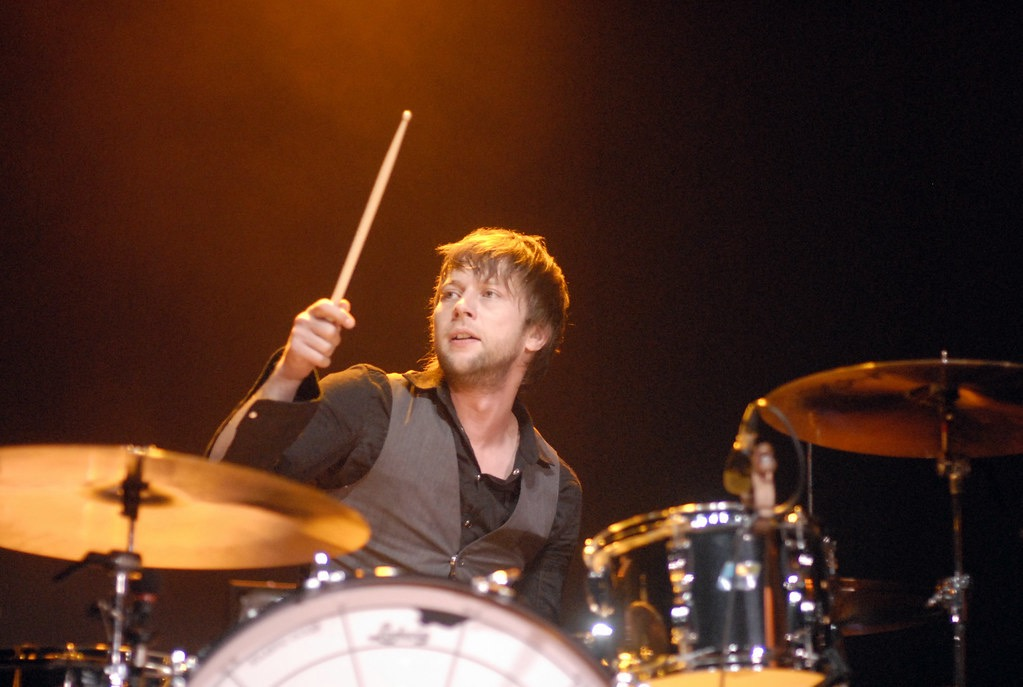
- Keeler performing in 2008

Background information
- Born: James Patrick Keeler; October 6, 1975 (age 50)
- Origin: West Harrison, Indiana; resides: Nashville, Tennessee
- Occupations: Musician
- Instruments: Drums, percussion, clarinet, harmonica, backing vocals

James Patrick Keeler is an American rock drummer from Cincinnati. He is best known as a member of the The Greenhornes, The Raconteurs, and The Afghan Whigs. He plays with both traditional and matched grips.

After previously performing and recording together as members of The Raconteurs, Keeler is currently the drummer in Jack White's backing band, where he has contributed significantly to the garage rock studio albums, No Name (2024) and Frozen Charlotte (2026).

== Recording career ==
Keeler has played with garage rock band The Greenhornes along with vocalist Craig Fox and Jack Lawrence, since 1996. The Greenhornes have released five albums to date, 'The Greenhornes', 'Gun for You', 'Dual Mono', 'East Grand Blues EP' and '★★★★'. Their song 'There Is an End', featuring Holly Golightly, was used in the Jim Jarmusch film 'Broken Flowers', starring Bill Murray.

In 2004, Keeler played drums on the Loretta Lynn album Van Lear Rose in the band that album producer Jack White put together. The band called themselves The Do Whaters, and also featured Lawrence on bass and Dave Feeny on pedal steel guitar. Despite containing three future Raconteurs, The Do Whaters share little in terms of musical styling. The Raconteurs are a band formed with long-time friends Brendan Benson, Jack White of The White Stripes and "Little" Jack Lawrence. They released their debut album, Broken Boy Soldiers, in April 2006 and its follow-up Consolers of the Lonely in March 2008.

Keeler also played two shows with fellow garage rockers The Dirtbombs in 2004. At one point, Keeler could have been a candidate as the drummer of Wolfmother, but the band's record company asked guitarist/vocalist Andrew Stockdale to hold auditions.

As of March 2015, Keeler is touring with the Afghan Whigs.

In 2025, Keeler toured with Jack White, after contributing to his 2024 studio album, No Name. A follow-up album featuring Keeler, Frozen Charlotte, was released in 2026 with continued touring accompanying the album's release.

== Musical equipment ==
Keeler plays Ludwig drums and uses DW stands and Tama Speed Cobra pedals. He also recently switched to using Zildjian A and K Dark and Light cymbals, having previously used Paiste Giant Beat cymbals.

Ludwig drums in Gold Sparkle finish (2006)

12" rack tom

16" floor tom

28" bass drum

18x14" bass drum

Ludwig Black Beauty snare drum

Ludwig Stainless Steel Reissue Drum Kit (2008) and Paiste Cymbals

26x14" bass drum

8x12" rack tom

16x16" and 16x18" floor toms

Ludwig Black Beauty 6.5x14 reissue snare w/tube lugs

Ludwig 6.5x14 Supra-Phonic reissue snare

Paiste Giant Beat Cymbals

15" hi-hats

18" crash

24" ride

20" crash

DW hardware - DW 6000 series stands

Ludwig standard kick drum pedal (not a Speed King)

Remo heads (either Ambassadors or Emperors on all drums)

Vater Studio sticks/stick holders

Ludwig Green Vistalite Drum Kit (2011) Ludwig released a signature Patrick Keeler kit from their Vistalite line.

Ludwig Club Date in Black/Gold Duco and Zildjian Cymbals (current)

20"x14" bass drum

12"x8" rack tom

14"x14" floor tom

14"x6.5" Supraphonic snare or 14"x6.5" Black Beauty snare

Zildjian A and K series

14" A quick beat hi-hats or 14" A new beat hi-hats

18" K dark crash thin

22" or 24" K light ride

19" K dark crash thin

- Also uses the newer Kerope series on occasion

== Selected discography ==
- The Greenhornes - Gun For You (1999)
- The Greenhornes - The Greenhornes (2001)
- The Greenhornes - Dual Mono (2002)
- Loretta Lynn - Van Lear Rose (2004)
- The Greenhornes - East Grand Blues EP (2005)
- The Dirtbombs - If You Don't Already Have a Look (2005)
- The Greenhornes - Sewed Soles (2005)
- The Raconteurs - Broken Boy Soldiers (2006)
- The Raconteurs - Consolers of the Lonely (2008)
- The Greenhornes - ★★★★ (2010)
- Butch Walker and the Black Widows - The Spade (2011)
- Jack White - Blunderbuss (2012)
- Jack White - Lazaretto (album) (2014)
- The Raconteurs - Help Us Stranger (2019)
