= Broken Boy Soldiers =

Studio album by the Raconteurs
- Released: May 16, 2006
- Recorded: 2005
- Studio: Le Grande (Detroit, MI)
- Genre: Alternative rock; garage rock; power pop; psychedelic rock
- Length: 33:42
- Label: Third Man; XL; V2
- Producer: Brendan Benson; Jack White

The Raconteurs chronology
Broken Boy Soldiers (2006)	Consolers of the Lonely (2008)

Singles from Broken Boy Soldiers
- 1. "Steady, As She Goes" Released: March 20, 2006; 2. "Hands" Released: July 31, 2006; 3. "Level" Released: August 24, 2006; 4. "Broken Boy Soldier" Released: October 23, 2006

Broken Boy Soldiers is the debut studio album by American rock band the Raconteurs, released on May 15, 2006 in the United Kingdom and May 16, 2006 in the United States. The album was generally favored among critics and spawned the hit single "Steady, As She Goes". The album earned a nomination for Best Rock Album at the 49th Grammy Awards.

== Recording history ==
The songs were written by Brendan Benson and Jack White. "Steady, As She Goes" was the first song the pair worked on, followed by "Broken Boy Soldier". After the completion of these two songs and their demos, they called in Jack Lawrence and Patrick Keeler to work on the songs. The album was recorded at Le Grande on 419 Grand Boulevard in Detroit, MI. Coles 4038 microphones were exclusively used for the recording of the album.

In an interview with Uncut magazine, White said that "Store Bought Bones" originated from an outtake of the White Stripes album, Get Behind Me Satan. In the same interview, Benson also said that "Call It a Day" and "Together" were both songs he was working on for his next solo album.

Benson said in an interview with Mojo magazine that the album feels like a demo because of how the band plays the songs live now. "Hands" features an outro heavily influenced by AC/DC's "Back in Black", "Call It a Day" has been sped up (found on the Zane Lowe EP), "Store Bought Bones" has been merged with B-side "The Bane Rendition", and many other changes.

The cover was photographed by Autumn de Wilde and designed by Patrick Keeler and Aleksey Shirokov.

== Critical reception ==
Professional ratings
Aggregate scores
Source	Rating
Metacritic	75/100
Review scores
Source	Rating
AllMusic	3.5/5 stars
The A.V. Club	B
Entertainment Weekly	B−
Los Angeles Times	4/4 stars
Mojo	4/5 stars
NME	6/10
Pitchfork	7.3/10
Q	4/5 stars
Rolling Stone	4/5 stars
Spin	4/5 stars

Critics were generally favorable towards Broken Boy Soldiers. Rolling Stone said of the album "Expectations were sky-high, but the Raconteurs exceed them all." People magazine gave the album three-and-a-half stars, making the album the Critic's Choice of the week; they commented "Broken Boy Soldiers incorporates just enough weirdness to show that he (White) hasn't completely changed his stripes." More conservatively, Billboard remarked "No one is breaking any ground here, and White fanatics looking for a new White Stripes record should temper their expectations. But as far as side projects go, this is as good as it gets."

Dan Raper of PopMatters described the group's sound in the album as "garage-tinged/power-pop/rock 'n' roll, the kind of straightforward verse-chorus-bridge songs that do well on commercial radio". Rob Fitzpatrick of NME regarded it as "psychedelic pop-rock that was popular between 1965 and 1968". Stephen Thomas Erlewine of AllMusic commented that the album's songs "prove that the Raconteurs are nothing less than a first-rate power pop band".

The album ranked No. 28 on Rolling Stone's year-end critic's list and No. 19 on Spin Magazine's year-end Top 40 albums. It entered the UK charts at #2 and managed to reach #7 in the U.S. As of 2009, the album has sold 522,000 copies in United States. In December 2006, Britain's Mojo magazine made it their Album of the Year. The lead single "Steady, As She Goes" became the band's first Top 10 hit in the UK.

== Track listing ==
All songs by Brendan Benson and Jack White.

No.	Title	Length
1.	"Steady, As She Goes"	3:35
2.	"Hands"	4:01
3.	"Broken Boy Soldier"	3:02
4.	"Intimate Secretary"	3:30
5.	"Together"	3:58
6.	"Level"	2:21
7.	"Store Bought Bones"	2:25
8.	"Yellow Sun"	3:20
9.	"Call It a Day"	3:36
10.	"Blue Veins"	3:54
Total length:		33:42

Japanese edition

No.	Title	Length
11.	"The Bane Rendition"	4:21
Total length:		38:03

== Personnel ==
Credits are adapted from the album's liner notes.

The Raconteurs

- Jack White – vocals, guitar, synthesizers, production, mixing
- Brendan Benson – vocals, guitar, keyboards, production, recording
- Jack Lawrence – bass guitar
- Patrick Keeler – drums, percussion

Additional personnel

- Vlado Meller – mastering
- John Hampton – mixing
- Adam Hill – assistant engineer
- Matthew Kettle – recording

== Charts ==
=== Weekly charts ===
Weekly chart performance for Broken Boy Soldiers
Chart (2006)	Peak position
Australian Albums (ARIA)	14
Austrian Albums (Ö3 Austria)	30
Belgian Albums (Ultratop Flanders)	15
Belgian Albums (Ultratop Wallonia)	32
Canadian Albums (Billboard)	8
Danish Albums (Hitlisten)	11
Dutch Albums (Album Top 100)	40
Finnish Albums (Suomen virallinen lista)	34
French Albums (SNEP)	26
German Albums (Offizielle Top 100)	28
Irish Albums (IRMA)	4
Italian Albums (FIMI)	39
New Zealand Albums (RMNZ)	12
Norwegian Albums (VG-lista)	8
Scottish Albums (OCC)	4
Swedish Albums (Sverigetopplistan)	15
Swiss Albums (Schweizer Hitparade)	9
UK Albums (OCC)	2
UK Independent Albums (OCC)	1
US Billboard 200	7
US Top Rock Albums (Billboard)	3

=== Year-end charts ===
Year-end chart performance for Broken Boy Soldiers
Chart (2006)	Position
Belgian Albums (Ultratop Flanders)	96
UK Albums (OCC)	96
US Billboard 200	193

== Certifications ==
Certifications for Broken Boy Soldiers
Region	Certification	Certified units/sales
United Kingdom (BPI)	Gold	100,000^{^}
^{^} Shipments figures based on certification alone.

== Release history ==
Release dates and formats for Broken Boy Soldiers
Region	Date	Label
Germany	May 12, 2006	XL
United Kingdom	May 15, 2006	XL
Spain	May 15, 2006	XL
United States	May 16, 2006	Warner Bros.
Canada	May 16, 2006	Warner Music Canada
France	May 16, 2006	Beggars
China	March 1, 2007	Hal Leonard
Mexico	March 1, 2007	Hal Leonard
