= Brendan Benson =

American musician (born 1970)

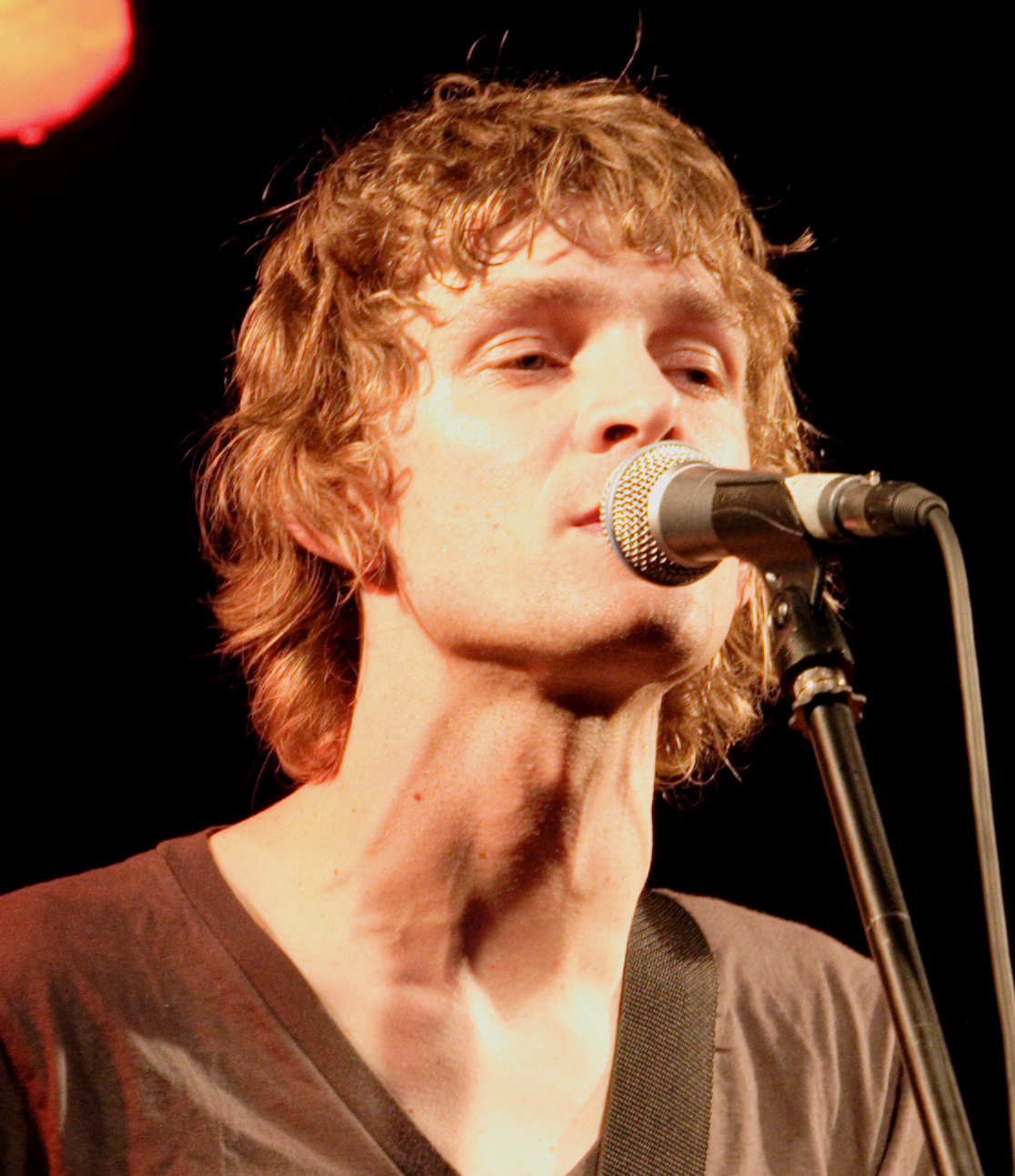
- Benson performing in November 2005

Background information
- Born: November 14, 1970 (age 55); Royal Oak, Michigan, U.S.
- Genres: Rock, indie rock, power pop, alternative rock
- Instruments: Vocals, guitar, bass guitar, keyboard, drums
- Years active: 1995–present
- Labels: Virgin, Startime International, Readymade Records, Lojinx, ATO; V2 Records (previous); MapleMusic Recordings (Canada), Dine Alone Records
- Website: brendanbenson.com

Brendan Benson (born November 14, 1970) is an American musician and singer-songwriter. He plays guitar, bass guitar, keyboard, and drums. He has released eight solo albums and is a member of the band The Raconteurs.

== Recording career ==
=== One Mississippi ===
Benson was born in Royal Oak, Michigan. His debut album, One Mississippi, was released in 1996 on Virgin Records. The album, which features several contributions from Jason Falkner, failed to sell in sufficient numbers and Benson was subsequently dropped by Virgin.

=== Lapalco ===
In 2002, the follow-up to One Mississippi was released, Lapalco. Again, the critical plaudits poured in, but this time the record enjoyed a certain degree of commercial success, selling more than three times as many copies as One Mississippi.

The song "Good To Me" from this album appeared on the British show Teachers during series three and was included on the series soundtrack; it was also covered by The White Stripes for the B-side of the single Seven Nation Army. The song "Tiny Spark" featured on an episode in the fourth series of Teachers, as well as in the feature films Along Came Polly, and World's Greatest Dad.

While touring this record, Benson played the Reading and Leeds Festivals and finished his Leeds set with a performance of the track "Jet Lag" featuring guest appearances from Meg White of The White Stripes along with members of The Datsuns and Soledad Brothers. In 2003 Benson re-released his debut album along with bonus tracks including the unreleased six-track extended play Wellfed Boy EP.

In 2003, Benson also released Metarie, with his then band The Well Fed Boys, and which featured a cover of Paul McCartney's Let Me Roll It, which featured back-up vocals by Jack White. This was the first song written completely by another artist to be featured on a Benson release. Another cover, this time "Strong Boy", from Gram Parsons International Submarine Band 1968 album, Safe at Home, was released as a B-side in 2005.

=== The Alternative to Love ===
In 2005, Benson released his third album, The Alternative to Love, and toured extensively in the US, UK, and Europe with his new touring band, The Stiff Tissues. "Spit It Out" was the first single and reached the UK Top 75 for the first time (peaking at No. 75 in April), and also generated some buzz for Benson. Two further singles were released from the album. "Cold Hands Warm Heart" appeared in many commercials and TV shows and "What I'm Looking For" was used in multiple national advertising campaigns. This album charted at No. 70 in the UK Albums Chart.

=== The Raconteurs ===
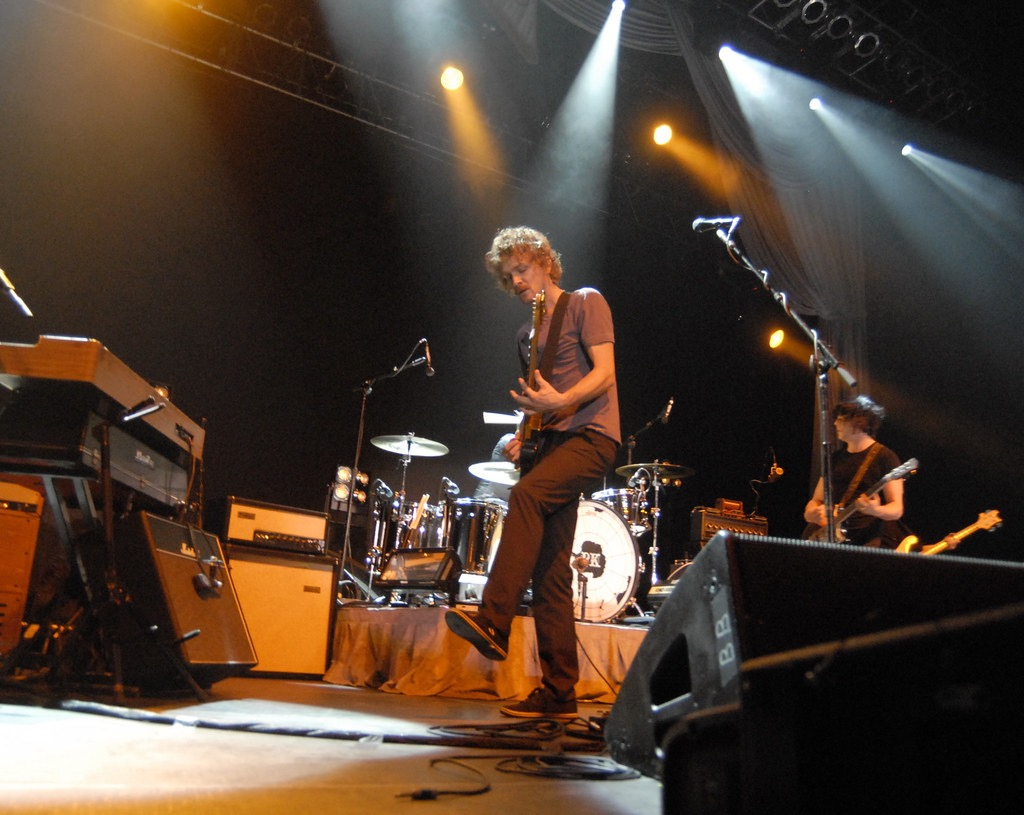
Brendan Benson Performs with the Raconteurs in 2008 in Seattle.

Benson is a member of The Raconteurs, a collaboration with Jack White, Jack Lawrence, and Patrick Keeler. Benson and White co-write the songs. The group's debut album, Broken Boy Soldiers, was released in the US on May 16, 2006, with "Steady, As She Goes" as the first single. Benson worked as a producer for The Greenhornes, The Nice Device, The Mood Elevator (a permutation of The Well Fed Boys), Whirlwind Heat, and the Stiff Tissues member Dean Fertita's former band, The Waxwings. The Raconteurs released their second album, Consolers of the Lonely in March 2008.

=== My Old, Familiar Friend ===
Benson's fourth album was My Old, Familiar Friend. In March 2007, a handful of demos from Benson's upcoming album were posted on his Myspace. "Feel Like Taking You Home" was the first of these demos to appear. Around the same time the demos of "Forget", "Poised And Ready" and "Go Nowhere" leaked onto the internet. Later he posted more songs on his MySpace including "Lesson Learned", "Eyes on the Horizon", and "Untitled". Dean Fertita, who played keyboards with the Raconteurs on tour and now is with Queens of the Stone Age and The Dead Weather, plays piano on all the Benson demos, with all other instruments played by Benson.

In October 2007, two new songs, "Purely Automatic" and "Will it Keep," were published on Benson's official website, presumably finished songs from the album. In November 2008, he uploaded a new song, "Playdown", on his Myspace, but it was quickly taken down. He soon put it back up along with another new song called "No One Else But You". Soon after, the songs "O My Love" and "New Words of Wisdom" were added to his page. Later he added "I'll Never Tell", "Happy Most of the Time", "Only in a Dream" (cover of Young Hines), and "Diamond" on his official MySpace page and he also added "Open Your Eyes" on his Reverb Nation page. In mid March 2009 Brendan put a collaboration with his girlfriend Britt, "The Hunter Gets Captured by the Game" (cover of The Marvelettes) on his Myspace page.

On March 18, 2009, KRCW played a new song "A Whole Lot Better" and on May 10, 2009, KRCW played another new song entitled "Garbage Day" both presumably finished songs off his fourth album. The title "My Old, Familiar Friend" and the track list were revealed on June 4, 2009. The album was released on August 18, 2009. My Old, Familiar Friend was produced by Gil Norton according to his MySpace page. He is backed by the Features on some of the record.

=== Collaboration with Ashley Monroe ===
In late 2008, Ashley Monroe collaborated with The Raconteurs and Ricky Skaggs on The Raconteurs single, "Old Enough", which was released in bluegrass form, and as a music video which was in rotation on CMT.

In early February 2009, two songs entitled "The Things I Do" and "Grey" appeared on Monroe's MySpace along with this message:

"Hey everyone! I just wanted to write ya a quick note to tell you I have put up some new songs you guys haven't heard. I have been working with Brendan Benson ... who I met on the set on The Raconteurs video shoot... and I am SOOO EXCITED about the music we have been making. I can't wait to share more! The two songs I posted of ours are "The Things I Do" and "Grey"... hope you love them as much as I do!"

=== Well & Goode ===
Benson teamed with Raconteurs touring member Mark Watrous (Gosling, Loudermilk) in October 2010 to release a single as the fictional duo "Midas Well" and "Upton O. Goode". Well & Goode's debut single was a 7" vinyl record and digital download, and featured the songs "Spray Tan" and "Two Birds".

=== What Kind of World ===
What Kind of World was released on April 21, 2012. It was released on his own new label Readymade Records in the USA, and on the indie label Lojinx in Europe. The album was recorded at "Welcome to 1979" Studios in Nashville, Tennessee and recorded entirely in analog. What Kind of World peaked at No. 7 on the UK Indie album chart in the week of release.

=== You Were Right ===
You Were Right is the sixth studio album released in December 2013 under Benson's own label Readymade Records in the USA, on Lojinx in Europe, and on Dine Alone Records in Canada. The album is the culmination of a monthly singles series recorded in Nashville, Tennessee at Readymade Studios.

=== Readymade records ===
Readymade Records was announced by Benson in early 2012. The label was started with Benson and Young Hines as the first two signed artists. Benson released What Kind of World in the US on April 21, 2012. The album was released in the UK on April 30, 2012. Young Hines released Give Me My Change in the US on April 10, 2012.

=== Dear Life and Low Key ===
Dear Life, Benson's seventh album, was released on April 24, 2020. His eighth album, Low Key, was released on December 2, 2022.

== Discography ==
Studio albums

- One Mississippi (1996)
- Lapalco (2002)
- The Alternative to Love (2005)
- My Old, Familiar Friend (2009)
- What Kind of World (2012)
- You Were Right (2013)
- Dear Life (2020)
- Low Key (2022)

EPs

- Folk Singer (2002)
- Metarie (2003)

Singles

- "Folk Singer" (April 22, 2002)
- "Tiny Spark" (July 8, 2002)
- "Good To Me" (October 28, 2002)
- "Metarie" (April 14, 2003)
- "Spit It Out" (March 28, 2005) – UK No. 75
- "Cold Hands (Warm Heart)" (July 4, 2005)
- "What I'm Looking For" (November 7, 2005)
- "A Whole Lot Better" (August 2009)
- "Feel Like Taking You Home"
- "Bad For Me"
- "Swimming" (January 22, 2013)
- "Oh My Love" (February 19, 2013)
- "Purely Automatic" (March 12, 2013)

Videos

- "Crosseyed" (1996)
- "Tiny Spark" (2002)
- "Metarie" (2003)
- "Spit It Out" (2005)
- "Cold Hands (Warm Heart)" (2005)
- "A Whole Lot Better" (2009)
- "Pretty Baby" (2012) – Directed by Young Hines

B-sides and covers

- "Son of a Welder" (B-side from Folk Singer EP)
- "Unfortunate Guy" (B-side from Folk Singer EP)
- "Feel Like Myself" (B-side from Folk Singer EP)
- "Metarie" (Well Fed Boys version from Metarie EP)
- "Metarie" (UK version from Metarie EP)
- "Alternative To Love" (Early version from Metarie EP)
- "You're Quiet" (Well Fed Boys version from Metarie EP)
- "Let Me Roll It" (cover of Paul McCartney from Metarie EP)
- "The Swamp" (Bonus track on the Japanese version of "One Mississippi", 1996)
- "Jet Stream" (Bonus track on the Japanese version of "One Mississippi", 1996)
- "Meaning To Write" (B-side from "Tiny Spark" single)
- "No Dial Tone" (Recorded live at the Bowery Ballroom in 2002 from "Tiny Spark" single)
- "Old Fashioned" (B-side from "Good To Me" single)
- "Pleasure Seeker" (Recorded live at the Bowery Ballroom in 2002, from "Good To Me" single)
- "Left And Right" (B-side from "Spit It Out" single)
- "Baby on a Rug" (B-side from "Spit It Out" single)
- "Some Day" (B-side from "Cold Hands (Warm Heart)" single)
- "Christopher's Revolt" (B-side from "Cold Hands (Warm Heart)" single)
- "Cold Hands (Warm Heart)" (Live acoustic version from Cold Hands (Warm Heart) EP)
- "Cold Hands (Warm Heart)" (Chris Shaw mix from Cold Hands (Warm Heart) EP)
- "Strong Boy" (Gram Parsons cover from "Cold Hands (Warm Heart)" single)
- "What I'm Looking For" (Michael Brauer mix from What I'm Looking For EP)
- "Them And Me" (Alternative version from What I'm Looking For EP)
- "Floating" (Jape cover recorded live in Newcastle, 2006)
- "I'll Never Tell" (iTunes bonus track)
- "New Words of Wisdom" (Bonus track from My Old, Familiar Friend)
- "Playdown" (Bee Gees' cover, from "Feel Like Taking You Home")
- "Circle" (featuring Jessie Baylin)
- "Better Days" (Graham Nash cover, from "A Tribute to Graham Nash's Songs for Beginners" on Grassroots Records, 2010)
- "Maybe So Hard" (Out take, bundled with the 2011 Lapalco reissue)
- "Doctor, Doctor" (The Who cover, from "The New Sell Out" by Futureman Records, 2012)
- "Go Deco" (B-side of the Record Store Day exclusive "What Kind of World" 7", 2012)

Produced

- "Life in the D", taken from "Acoustic, Vol. III" – Brendan Benson (2003)
- "East Grand Blues" EP – The Greenhornes (2005)
- "Baby I'm With the Band", taken from "Cho Dependent" – Margaret Cho (2010)
- "Forever Halloween" – The Maine (2013)
- "Robyn Hitchcock" - Robyn Hitchcock (2017)

Produced & Mixed

- "Meaning to Write", from "Detroit Now 1.5" – Brendan Benson (2001)
- "Flamingo Honey" – Whirlwind Heat (2004)
- "Let's Make Our Descent" – The Waxwings (2004)
- "The Muldoons" – The Muldoons (2007)
- "Two Birds" – Well & Goode (2010)
- "Simple Man", taken from "Music Gets You High: Songs of Graham Nash" – Brendan Benson (2010)
- "Better Days", taken from "A Tribute to Graham Nash's Songs for Beginners" – Brendan Benson (2010)
- "Last Night in Detroit" – Brendan Benson (2011)
- "Upstairs at United, Vol 1" EP – Brendan Benson (2011)
- "Give Me My Change" – Young Hines (2012)
- "Old Believers" – Cory Chisel and The Wandering Sons (2012)
- "The Passing of the Night" – The Lost Brothers (2012)
- "Eric Burdon & The Greenhornes" EP – Eric Burdon & The Greenhorns (2012)
- "Howl" – The Howling Brothers (2013)

Co-produced & Engineered

- "One Mississippi" – Brendan Benson (1996)
- "Listen Up!" – The Mood Elevator (2000)
- "The Open Heart" – New Grenada (2002)
- "Long Hard Look" EP – The Mood Elevator (2003)
- "Metarie" EP – Brendan Benson (2003)
- "Married Alive" – The Mood Elevator (2003)
- "One Mississippi/The Wellfed Boy" EP – Brendan Benson (2003)
- "If We Can't Trust The Dr's..." – Blanche (2004)
- "Sewed Souls" – The Greenhornes (2005)
- "Alternative To Love" – Brendan Benson (2005)
- "Broken Boy Soldier" – The Raconteurs (2006)
- "Consolers of the Lonely" – The Raconteurs (2008)
- "Hello=Fire" – Hello=Fire (2009)
- "My Old Familiar Friend" – Brendan Benson (2009)
- "Death Won't Send A Letter" – Cory Chisel and The Wandering Sons (2009)
- "****" – The Greenhornes (2010)

Co-produced, Engineered and Mixed

- "Folk Singer", taken from "International Pop Overthrow, Vol. IV" – Brendan Benson (2001)
- "Lapalco" – Brendan Benson (2002)
- "Folk Singer" EP – Brendan Benson (2002)

Engineered

- "Birth of a Lover" – The Nice Device (2003)
- "Van Lear Rose" – Loretta Lynn (2004)
- "Rated X", taken from "Coal Miner's Daughter: A Tribute To Loretta Lynn" – The White Stripes (2010)
