= Jack Lawrence (bass guitarist) =

American musician

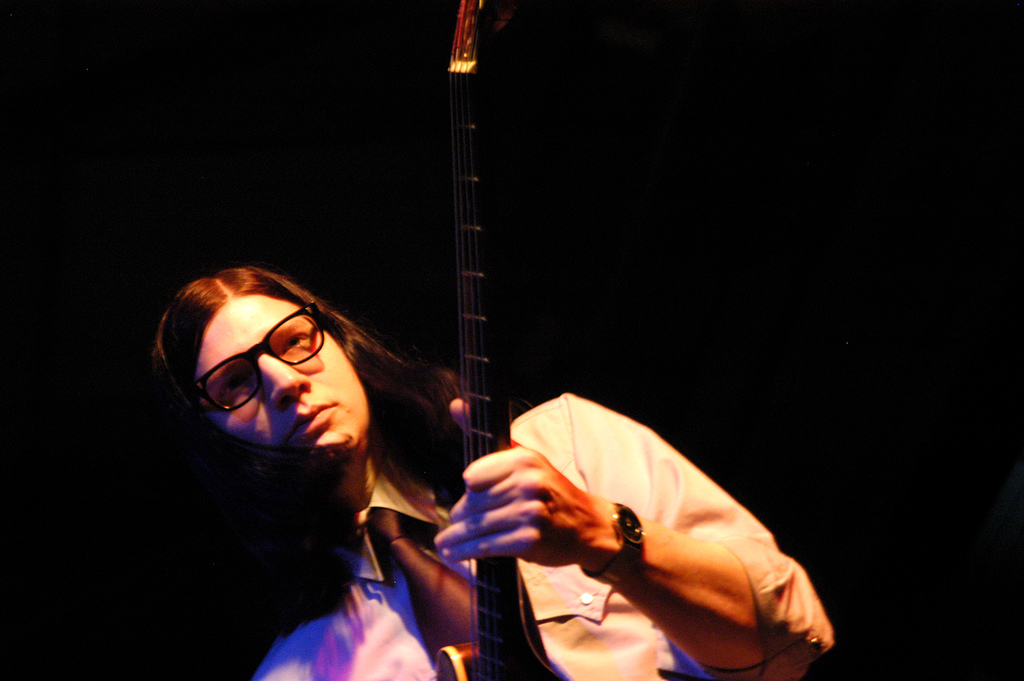
- Lawrence performing in 2006

Background information
- Also known as: Little Jack
- Born: December 18, 1976 (age 49); Covington, Kentucky
- Genre: Rock
- Occupations: Musician, songwriter
- Instruments: Bass guitar, autoharp, banjo, piano, vocals, drums, guitar, clarinet, mandolin, accordion, double bass
- Years active: 1996–present
- Labels: V2, Telstar, Third Man, Warner Bros., XL,

Jack Lawrence (born December 18, 1976) is an American musician from Covington, Kentucky, currently living in Nashville, Tennessee.

== Career ==
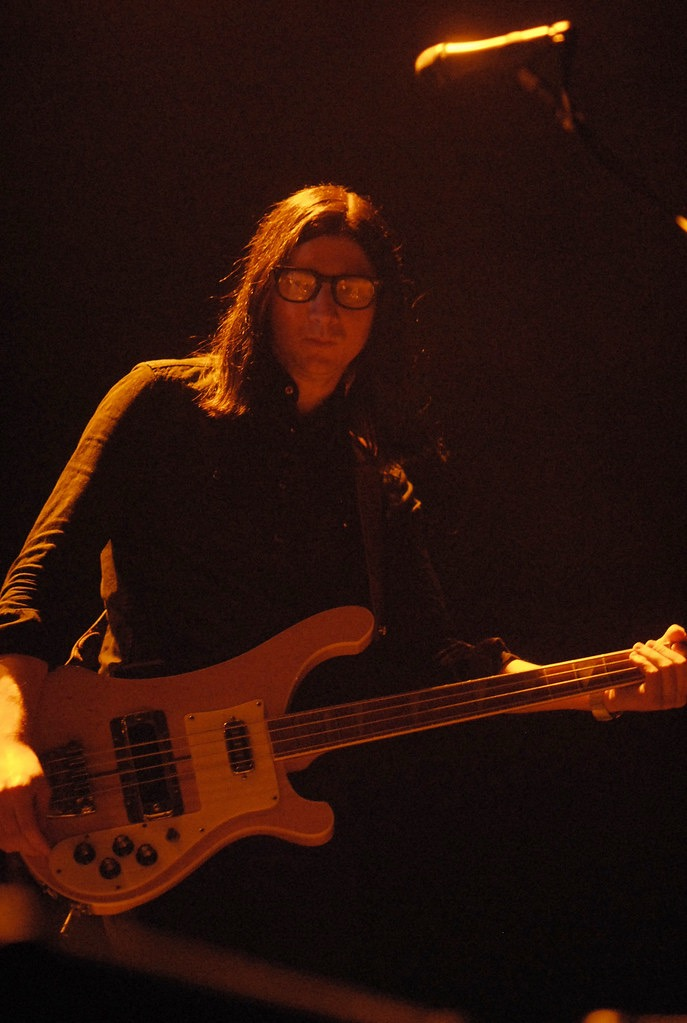
Jack Lawrence performs with the Raconteurs in Seattle in 2008.

Lawrence plays bass guitar in the Raconteurs, the Greenhornes, the Dead Weather and City and Colour as well as the autoharp and banjo in Blanche. He also guested on the theme song to the 2008 Bond film Quantum of Solace entitled "Another Way To Die", playing bass guitar and baritone guitar. On May 22, 2009, Lawrence married photographer Jo McCaughey at Jack White's house in Nashville in a double ceremony with Meg White and Jackson Smith. Lawrence contributed to the soundtrack of the 2009 Spike Jonze film Where the Wild Things Are. He is uncredited but is one of the members of Karen O's backup band for the album, Karen O and the Kids. He is also credited on four songs from Wanda Jackson's album, The Party Ain't Over, which Jack White produced. He also plays bass on one track on White's album Blunderbuss and one track on Glim Spanky's album Looking for the Magic.

== Discography ==
- 1999 The Greenhornes - Gun for You
- 2001 The Greenhornes - The Greenhornes
- 2002 The Greenhornes - Dual Mono
- 2004 Loretta Lynn - Van Lear Rose
- 2004 Blanche - America's Newest Hitmakers
- 2005 The Greenhornes - East Grand Blues EP
- 2005 The Greenhornes - Sewed Soles
- 2006 The Raconteurs - Broken Boy Soldiers
- 2007 Blanche - Little Amber Bottles
- 2008 The Raconteurs - Consolers of the Lonely
- 2009 The Dead Weather - Horehound
- 2009 Karen O & The Kids - Where the Wild Things Are
- 2010 The Dead Weather - Sea of Cowards
- 2010 The Greenhornes - ★★★★
- 2010 Karen Elson - "The Ghost Who Walks"
- 2011 Wanda Jackson - "The Party Ain't Over"
- 2012 Jack White - "Blunderbuss"
- 2013 City and Colour - "The Hurry and the Harm"
- 2014 Karen O - "Crush Songs"
- 2015 JEFF the Brotherhood - "Wasted on the Dream"
- 2015 The Dead Weather - "Dodge and Burn"
- 2015 City and Colour - "If I Should Go Before You"
- 2015 JEFF the Brotherhood - Global Chakra Rhythms
- 2017 Foshee - Strange Relations
- 2018 Glim Spanky - "TV Show"
- 2019 The Raconteurs - Help Us Stranger
- 2019 City and Colour - A Pill For Loneliness
- 2025 U.S. Girls - Scratch It

== Equipment ==
=== Pedals ===
The Dead Weather

- Electro-Harmonix Bass Micro Synth (original and reissue)
- Fulltone Bass Drive
