= List of awards and nominations received by Jack White =

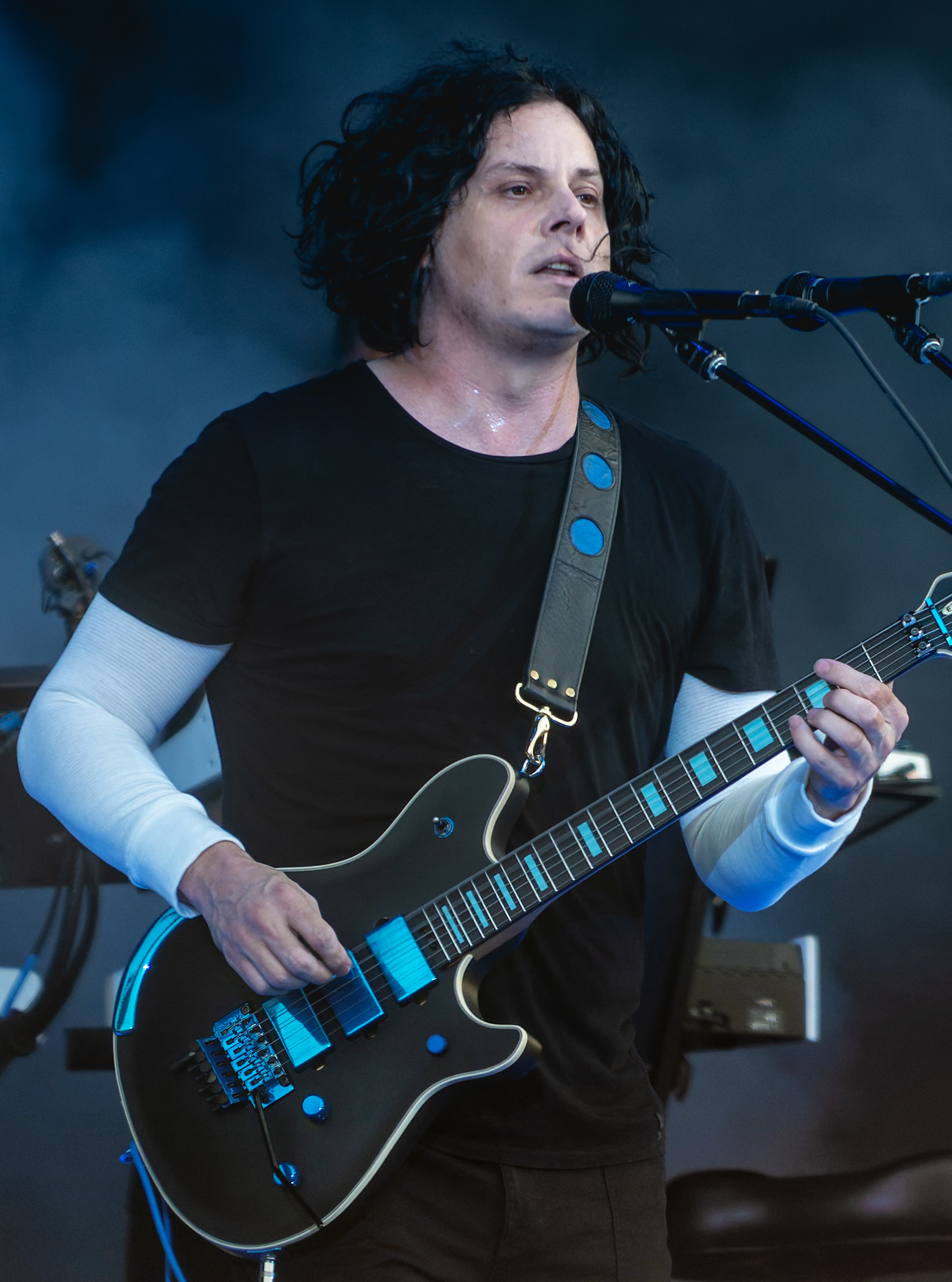
White performing in 2018

This is a list of awards and nominations received by musician Jack White.

== Solo accolades ==
=== Anty Radio Awards ===
Year	Nominee / work	Award	Result
2018	Jack White	Best International Vocalist	Won

=== Berlin Music Video Awards ===
Year	Nominee / work	Award	Result
2026	"Archbishop Harold Holmes"	Best Performer	Nominated

=== Best Art Vinyl ===
Year	Nominee / work	Award	Result
2022	Entering Heaven Alive Cover Art (Jack White)	Best Art Vinyl	Nominated

=== Brit Awards ===
Year	Nominee / work	Award	Result
2013	Jack White	International Male Solo Artist	Nominated
2015	Jack White	International Male Solo Artist	Nominated

=== British Academy Film Awards ===
Year	Nominee / work	Award	Result
2004	Cold Mountain (with Various Artists)	Best Film Music	Won

=== Clio Awards ===
Year	Nominee / work	Award	Result
2022	"Taking Me Back" Cover Art (Jack White)	Music Marketing - Packaging	Silver

=== Critics' Choice Movie Awards ===
Year	Nominee / work	Award	Result
2008	"Another Way To Die" (Jack White and Alicia Keys)	Best Song	Nominated

=== Detroit Music Award ===
Year	Nominee / work	Award	Result
2009	"Another Way To Die" (Jack White and Alicia Keys)	Outstanding National Single	Nominated
2013	Blunderbuss (Jack White)	Outstanding National Major Label Distribution Album	Nominated
2013	"Freedom at 21" (Jack White)	Outstanding National Single	Nominated
2013	"Freedom at 21" (Jack White)	Outstanding Video / Major Budget	Nominated
2013	"Love Interruption" (Jack White)	Outstanding National Single	Nominated
2013	"Love Interruption" (Jack White)	Outstanding Video / Major Budget	Nominated

=== Emmy Awards ===
Year	Nominee / work	Award	Result
2017	The American Epic Sessions (Bernard MacMahon, Duke Erikson, Jack White and T Bone Burnett)	Outstanding Music Direction	Nominated

=== Grammy Awards ===
Year	Nominee / work	Award	Result
2005	"Portland Oregon" (Jack White with Loretta Lynn)	Best Country Collaboration with Vocals	Won
2005	"Portland Oregon" (Jack White with Loretta Lynn)	Best Country Song	Nominated
2005	Cold Mountain (Jack White with Various Artists)	Best Compilation Soundtrack for Visual Media	Nominated
2005	Van Lear Rose (Loretta Lynn, Produced by Jack White)	Best Country Album	Won
2009	"Another Way to Die" (with Alicia Keys) (Jack White)	Best Music Video	Nominated
2013	Blunderbuss (Jack White)	Album of the Year	Nominated
2013	Blunderbuss (Jack White)	Best Rock Album	Nominated
2013	"Freedom at 21" (Jack White)	Best Rock Song	Nominated
2014	"I'm Shakin" (Jack White)	Best Rock Performance	Nominated
2014	"I'm Shakin" (Jack White)	Best Music Video	Nominated
2015	"Lazaretto" (Jack White)	Best Rock Song	Nominated
2015	"Lazaretto" (Jack White)	Best Rock Performance	Won
2015	Lazaretto (Jack White)	Best Alternative Music Album	Nominated
2015	The Rise & Fall Of Paramount Records, Volume One (1917-27) (Susan Archie, Dean Blackwood & Jack White)	Best Boxed or Special Limited Edition Package	Won
2016	The Rise & Fall Of Paramount Records, Volume Two (1928-32) (Susan Archie, Dean Blackwood & Jack White)	Best Boxed or Special Limited Edition Package	Won
2016	My Happiness (Elvis Presley)	Best Recording Package	Nominated
2017	Lemonade (Beyoncé)	Album of the Year	Nominated
2017	"Don't Hurt Yourself (with Beyoncé)	Best Rock Performance	Nominated
2017	—N/a	The Recording Academy Producers & Engineers Wing President’s Merit Award	Won
2025	No Name	Best Rock Album	Nominated

=== Hollywood Music in Media Awards ===
Year	Nominee / work	Award	Result
2017	The American Epic Sessions - "Two Fingers of Whiskey" - Bernie Taupin, Elton John, T Bone Burnett, Jack White	Best Original Song - Documentary	Nominated

=== Honorary Awards ===
Year	Award
2009	Honorary Patronage of Trinity College Dublin's Philosophical Society
2013	Honorary Dean of the Fermatta Music Academy in Mexico City
2019	Honorary Doctorate from Wayne State University

=== MTV Europe Music Awards ===
Year	Nominee / work	Award	Result
2012	Jack White	Best Alternative	Nominated
2012	Jack White	Best Look	Nominated

=== MTV Video Music Awards ===
Year	Nominee / work	Award	Result
2012	"Sixteen Saltines"	Best Rock Video	Nominated
2014	Lazaretto	Best Visual Effects (Visual Effects: Mathematic and Jonas Francois)	Nominated
2015	Would You Fight for My Love?	Best Art Direction (Art Director: Jeff Peterson)	Nominated
2022	Taking Me Back	Best Rock Music Video	Nominated

=== mtvU Woodie Awards ===
Year	Nominee / work	Award	Result
2013	Jack White	FOMO Woodie	Nominated
2013	Jack White	Branching Out Woodie	Nominated

=== Music Business Association ===
Year	Nominee / work	Award	Result
2015	Jack White	Innovator Award	Won

=== Music City Walk of Fame ===
Year	Nominee / work	Award	Result
2015	Jack White	Inductee	Won

=== NAMM Technical Excellence and Creativity Awards ===
Year	Nominee / work	Award	Result
2015	Lazaretto (Jack White)	Outstanding Creative Achievement Record Production/Album	Won

=== Nashville Songwriters Association International ===
Year	Nominee / work	Award	Result
2014	Jack White	Songwriter/Artist of the Year	Won

=== O Music Awards ===
Year	Nominee / work	Award	Result
2013	Jack White	Analog Genius Award	Won

=== People's Choice Awards USA ===
Year	Nominee / work	Award	Result
2009	"Another Way To Die" (Jack White and Alicia Keys)	Favorite Song from a Soundtrack	Nominated

=== Q Awards ===
Year	Nominee / work	Award	Result
2011	Jack White	Greatest Act of Last 25 Years	Nominated

=== Rock and Roll Hall of Fame ===
Year	Nominee / work	Award	Result
2023	Himself (with Meg White)	Hall of Fame	Nominated
2025	Himself (with Meg White)	Hall of Fame	Won

=== Satellite Awards ===
Year	Nominee / work	Award	Result
2008	"Another Way To Die" (Jack White and Alicia Keys)	Best Original Song	Won

=== Sweden GAFFA Awards ===
Year	Nominee / work	Award	Result
2019	Himself	Best Foreign Solo Act	Nominated

=== UK Music Video Awards ===
Year	Nominee / work	Award	Result
2012	"Two Against One" video (Danger Mouse feat. Jack White)	Best Alternative Video - International	Nominated
2012	"Sixteen Saltines" video (Jack White)	Best Indie/Rock Video - International	Nominated

== Band accolades ==
With the White Stripes, he won a Brit Award, six Grammy Awards, one Meteor Music Award, five MTV Video Music Awards, one MTV Europe Music Award, one MuchMusic Video Award, and one NME Award. He was inducted with Meg White into the Rock and Roll Hall of Fame in 2025.
