= Over and Over and Over =

Single by Jack White

from the album Boarding House Reach
- B-side: "Everything You've Ever Learned"
- Released: March 1, 2018
- Recorded: 2017
- Genre: Garage rock; blues rock; hard rock
- Length: 3:36
- Label: Third Man; XL; Columbia
- Songwriter: Jack White
- Producer: Jack White

Jack White singles chronology
"Corporation" (2018)	"Over and Over and Over" (2018)	"Ice Station Zebra" (2018)

"Over and Over and Over" is a song by American musician Jack White. It was released as the third single from his third solo studio album, Boarding House Reach (2018), on March 1, 2018. In the US, the song peaked at number 20 on the Alternative Songs chart and number 33 on the Hot Rock Songs chart.

== Background and composition ==
"Over and Over and Over" was recorded by White in March 2005 when he was still in the White Stripes during the Get Behind Me Satan sessions and again in January 2007 during the Icky Thump sessions. He would later attempt to record it again with his side projects, the Raconteurs, The Dead Weather, and his first solo album, Blunderbuss. The song was also recorded in collaboration with American rapper Jay-Z under the title "Ray Bans". Ultimately, he chose not to record the song until the sessions for Boarding House Reach in 2017. White recalled in an article with Rolling Stone that he "chased it and chased it" and eventually managed to finally have a final product ready.

"Over and Over and Over" has been described as a throwback to White's earlier garage rock works as well as a "blues rock jam". White served as the vocalist and performed electric guitar and tambourine on the track. It featured contributions from several session musicians. Louis Cato and Daru Jones played drums while Bobby Allende provided percussion, Charlotte Kemp Muhl played bass, and Neal Evans and DJ Harrison performed on synthesizers. White wrote, produced, and mixed the song, while Joshua V. Smith did the engineering with Ben Schmitz and Grant Valentine providing engineering assistance.

== Release ==
"Over and Over and Over" was released as a digital single on March 1, 2018. The release was accompanied by an animated visualizer video on YouTube. After its release, the song was made available for free as an instant download upon pre-ordering a digital version of Boarding House Reach. The single received its first physical release on March 9 as a single-sided tri-color 7" vinyl. This was made available, on that date only, exclusively at Boarding House Reach listening parties held at independent record stores across the United States. The single received another physical release later that month. It was another tri-color 7" vinyl, except with the album track "Everything You've Ever Learned" as a B-side.

White performed the song during the April 14 episode of Saturday Night Live's 43rd season. He also performed the song live at Spotify Studios in New York City for a Spotify Singles release, which was released on April 25 with a cover of the Modern Lovers song "Pablo Picasso" as the B-side. Get Behind Me Satan XX, a companion album to Get Behind Me Satan, was released in 2025 which included a studio outtake and demo of the song.

== Track listing ==
- Third Man – TMR-553

Side A
No.	Title	Length
1.	"Over and Over and Over"	3:36

Side B
No.	Title	Length
1.	"Everything You've Ever Learned"	2:13

== Charts ==
Chart (2018)	Peak position
Canada Rock (Billboard)	32
US Hot Rock & Alternative Songs (Billboard)	33
US Rock & Alternative Airplay (Billboard)	20
