= Fantasize =

Fantasize may refer to:

- Making a fantasy
- Fantasize (album), a 2014 album by Kye Kye
- Fantasize, an album by Ponty Bone
- "Fantasize", a 2009 single by Jérémy Amelin
- "Fantasize", a song by The Specials from the 1998 album Guilty 'til Proved Innocent!
- "Fantasize", a song by Liz Phair from the 1998 album whitechocolatespaceegg
- "Fantasize", a song by Guy Sebastian from the 2020 album T.R.U.T.H.
- "Fantisize", a song by Adéla from the 2026 album Prima
- "Fantasize" (song), an unreleased song by Ariana Grande
