= Aghori Mhori Mei =

Studio album by the Smashing Pumpkins
- Released: August 2, 2024
- Recorded: 2022–2024
- Genres: Progressive rock; alternative rock; heavy metal
- Length: 44:41
- Labels: Martha's Music; Thirty Tigers
- Producer: Billy Corgan

The Smashing Pumpkins chronology
Atum: A Rock Opera in Three Acts (2023)	Aghori Mhori Mei (2024)	Machina: Aranea Alba Editio (2025)

Singles from Aghori Mhori Mei
- 1. "Sighommi" Released: August 2, 2024; 2. "Who Goes There" Released: November 27, 2024

Aghori Mhori Mei is the thirteenth studio album by American rock band the Smashing Pumpkins. The album was released digitally on August 2, 2024, through Martha's Music and Thirty Tigers. Physical versions of the album were released on November 22, 2024. This is the band's first album since Zeitgeist (2007) to not feature guitarist Jeff Schroeder, following his departure in 2023.

The album was written and recorded over a two-year period and is billed as a "rock and roll guitar record". Written and produced by Billy Corgan, the album is a progressive rock, alternative rock and heavy metal record. The composition is largely driven by a mix of guitar, bass and drums with some mid-tempo tracks utilizing synthesizer and orchestral arrangements. The album had no singles prior to release. "Sighommi" was released as the first single from the album on August 2, 2024.

Upon the album's release, critical and fan reception was generally positive. Many reviewers praised the album and the band for returning to familiar territory, incorporating a heavier sound reminiscent of their earlier work. Some critics found issue with the production and mixing of the album, particularly around the vocal performance and mix.

== Background and development ==
In December 2022, Drummer Jimmy Chamberlin posted through his official Instagram account that the band were "back in the studio". In May 2023, Billy Corgan announced that the band had already began work on a follow-up album to triple album Atum: A Rock Opera in Three Acts (2022–2023). The band initially recorded 20 songs for the album with Corgan wanting to put out a record with "somewhere in the neighbourhood of 10 to 12 songs". Corgan described the album a "straight up rock and roll guitar record" and stated that "it very much sounds like the Siamese Dream / Mellon Collie version of the band.

In June 2024, Corgan gave an update on the band having worked on the album for "almost two years now". He described the pressure of recording new material to deadlines, stating that "It's not healthy, but I've gotten used to it through the years". He reiterated that "It's very much a rock, guitar record, old school" and that "old-school fans will be happy, for once".

In an interview with Audacy in August 2024, Corgan described how the band wanted to get into the "mindset" of recording songs in the spirit of Siamese Dream but not replicating the exact sound. Explaining that "you go back to the old school but with a new version of yourself", he further elaborated on using the old processes; "You just move on into other pastures, good and bad. You take your lumps as you go". The album was produced with the help of long-time band collaborator Howard Willing.

== Composition ==
The standard edition of the album consists of 10 songs, all written and produced by Billy Corgan with production assistance from Howard Willing. The album has elements of progressive rock, alternative rock, heavy metal and pop. The album's sound was influenced by heavy metal bands such as Black Sabbath and Dio, with several tracks taking on the characteristics of heavy metal and progressive rock. Some of the tracks such as "Goeth the Fall" take on a mid tempo ballad styling, with "Who Goes There" leaning into a more "bittersweet pop" presentation.

== Title and artwork ==
The album's official logo in Sanskrit styling.

The meaning of the album title was debated in several publications, with some attempting to decipher the meaning. Classic Rock attempted to use ChatGPT to give meaning to the title, without success. The magazine did give insight into the word "Aghori" relating to a "sect of Hindu ascetics known for their unconventional practices". In their review of the album, Beats Per Minute concluded the same meaning for the word "Aghori". Going further they opined that the word "Mhori" was an "alteration" of the word Mahori, a Sanskrit term that can mean "beautiful or attractive". They also tied the word "Mei" to a Hindi possessive term.

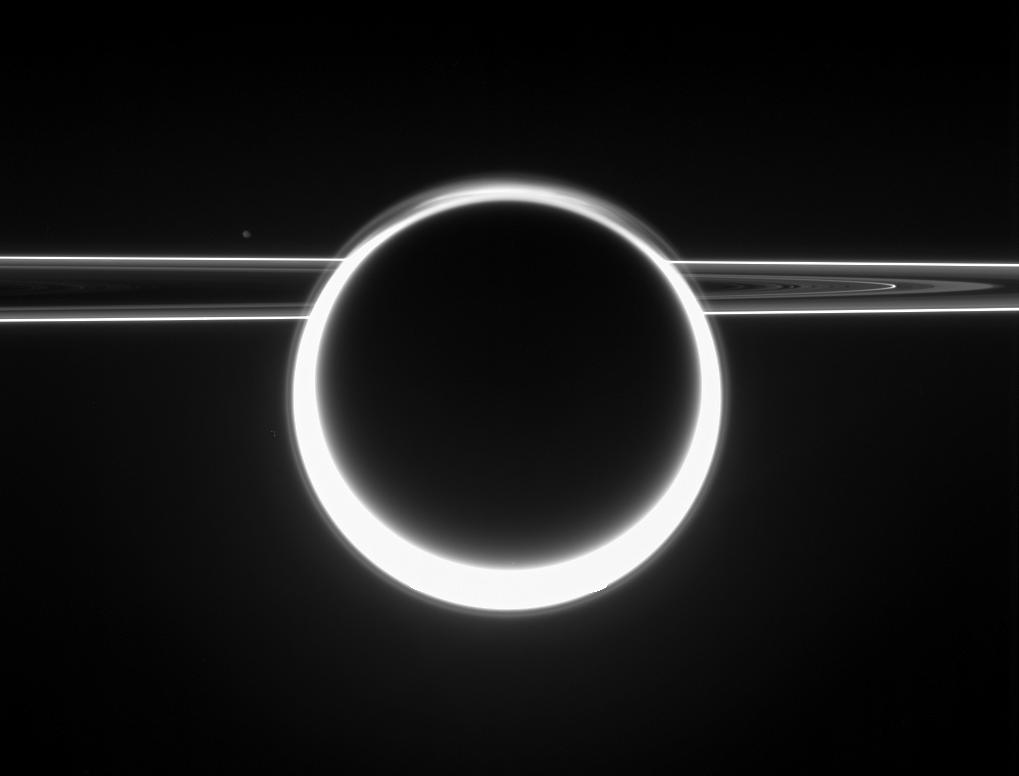
Photograph of Titan captured by the space probe Cassini–Huygens

The album artwork and packaging was designed by visual artist and band collaborator Katelan Foisy. It features a black-and-white picture of a spherical object in the foreground, with two white lines of decreasing vertical distance in the background. The album artwork was inspired by photographs from the Cassini–Huygens space research mission to study the planet Saturn and its system. Particular influence came from the mission's photographs of Saturn's Moon, Titan.

A unique gatefold vinyl variant of the album called "Aghori Mhori Mei: Madame ZuZu's edition" was released on 22 November 2024. The design of the alternative album cover is the same as the standard edition cover art, recolored in "chinoise red".

== Promotion and release ==
In the writing of this new album I became intrigued with the well-worn axiom, 'you can't go home again', which I have found personally to be true in form but thought well, what if we tried anyway? Not so much in looking backwards with sentimentality but rather as a means to move forward; to see if in the balance of success and failure that our ways of making music circa 1990-1996 would still inspire something revelatory.

— Billy Corgan, Aghori Mhori Mei press release

The album was released on August 2, 2024, through Martha's Music, and will be distributed digitally through streaming services and digital storefronts initially. Physical copies of the album were released on November 22, 2024. An exclusive edition vinyl named Aghori Mhori Mei: Madame ZuZu's edition was released through frontman Billy Corgan's Chicago tea room Madame ZuZu's. Corgan announced that no singles would be released prior to the album's release, explaining that the band "had to give the knee many times to what is the first song and what is the first statement and let other people judge us by one moment in time. We felt the right way to hear this record was an intact body of work".

Despite no singles being released before the albums release, "Sighommi" was released as the first single on August 2, 2024. It was promoted to alternative and rock format radio stations in the United States. The track was the number one most-added track to these formats in its first week of release. A second single, "Who Goes There" was released on November 27, 2024, and peaked at #41 on Billboard's Rock & Alternative Airplay charts.

A double A-side 7" single featuring "Formosa" and "Our Lady of Sorrows" was released on November 22, 2024, free with the "Madame ZuZu's edition" of the album.

In promotion for the album the band released a series of AI altered videos. The videos alter the English language version, with Billy Corgan promoting the album in various languages, including French, German and Japanese.

An outtake from the album's sessions, "Chrome Jets", was released as a standalone single on September 12, 2025.

== Critical reception ==
Aghori Mhori Mei ratings
Aggregate scores
Source	Rating
Metacritic	78/100
Review scores
Source	Rating
AllMusic	4.5/5 stars
Beats Per Minute	82%
Clash	8/10
Hot Press	8/10
The Irish Times	3/5 stars
Kerrang!	4/5 stars
Musikexpress	4/6 stars
Rolling Stone	2.5/5 stars
Sputnikmusic	3.0/5
Uncut	4/5 stars

According to the review aggregator Metacritic, Aghori Mhori Mei received "generally favorable reviews" based on a weighted average score of 78 out of 100 from 9 critic scores.

A number of critics regarded the album as a return to form for the band. AllMusic highly praised the album, calling it "a rock & roll pyre lit with myth and memory". Kerrang! praised the album, describing the album that as feeling "like the true return" and summarizing the record as "an excellent album that suggests intriguing possibilities going forward". Clash magazine equally praised the album, describing that the band were "back and are ready to make a racket" and calling the album "a welcome surprise from one of rocks [sic] most unpredictable acts". Beats Per Minute's John Wohlmacher called the album "a fully formed and cohesive work".

Rolling Stone was more critical of the record. Describing that the band had "lost little of their brute force", the reviewer felt that the return to rock had "reduced the Pumpkins to an unrelenting and often oppressive metal band". In a mixed review, The Irish Times Lauren Murphy opined that the album "lives up to expectations, for the most part". Singling out "Goeth the Fall", she called the track a "highlight".

Some critics found issue with the album's production and mix. Clash noted criticism with a lack of dynamics and high vocal mix on recent albums, singling out Cyr and Atum: A Rock Opera in Three Acts as examples. While the publication called the album's production a "massive improvement", the magazine suggested "working with an outside producer" going forward. Sputnikmusic had similar criticisms, stating that the production "struggles to mask its own artifice", but did note production as a "step up from previous ventures". Beats Per Minute singled out long-time collaborator Howard Willing, calling the vocal mix "noticeably digital" and that Willing "dries it up or modulates it unfavourably, adding tinny treble".

Reception amongst fans was reported as being "positive" towards the album. The album topped an "All-Genre Poll" run by Billboard, with music fans naming their favorite new music release of the week.

=== Year-end lists ===
Select year-end rankings for Aghori Mhori Mei
Publication/critic	Accolade	Rank	Ref.
AllMusic	Favourite Rock Albums – 2024	—N/a	
Loudwire	The 11 Best Rock Albums of 2024 Ranked	7	
Loudwire	The 51 Best Rock + Metal Albums of 2024	—N/a	
Ultimate Classic Rock	Top 25 Rock Albums of 2024	16	

== Track listing ==
Aghori Mhori Mei track listing
No.	Title	Length
1.	"Edin"	6:46
2.	"Pentagrams"	6:25
3.	"Sighommi"	2:54
4.	"Pentecost"	3:18
5.	"War Dreams of Itself"	3:28
6.	"Who Goes There"	3:28
7.	"999"	5:43
8.	"Goeth the Fall"	3:25
9.	"Sicarus"	4:15
10.	"Murnau"	4:59
Total length:		44:41

Aghori Mhori Mei: Madame ZuZu's edition bundled 7" single
No.	Title	Length
11.	"Formosa"	3:32
12.	"Our Lady of Sorrows"	3:03

All songs written by William Patrick Corgan

== Personnel ==
The Smashing Pumpkins

- Billy Corgan – vocals, guitar, bass guitar, keyboards, production
- Jimmy Chamberlin – drums
- James Iha – guitar

Additional personnel

- Katie Cole – backing vocals
- Jenna Fournier – backing vocals
- Howard Willing – engineering
- Andrew Scheps – mixing (tracks 1–9)
- Ryan Hewitt – mixing (track 10)

== Charts ==
Chart performance for Aghori Mhori Mei
Chart (2024)	Peak position
Australian Digital Albums (ARIA)	8
Belgian Albums (Ultratop Wallonia)	101
German Albums (Offizielle Top 100)	51
Japan Download Albums (Billboard Japan)	36
Japanese Digital Albums (Oricon)	43
Portuguese Albums (AFP)	93
Scottish Albums (Official Charts)	17
Swedish Physical Albums (Sverigetopplistan)	10
Swiss Albums (Schweizer Hitparade)	22
UK Album Downloads (Official Charts)	6
UK Album Sales (OCC)	21
UK Independent Albums (Official Charts)	9
US Billboard 200	130
US Independent Albums (Billboard)	19
US Top Rock & Alternative Albums (Billboard)	26

== Release history ==
Release history for Aghori Mhori Mei
Region	Date	Format(s)	Label(s)
Various	August 2, 2024	digital download; streaming	Martha's Music
Various	November 22, 2024	CD; vinyl	Martha's Music
