= Ruby Amanfu =

American singer-songwriter

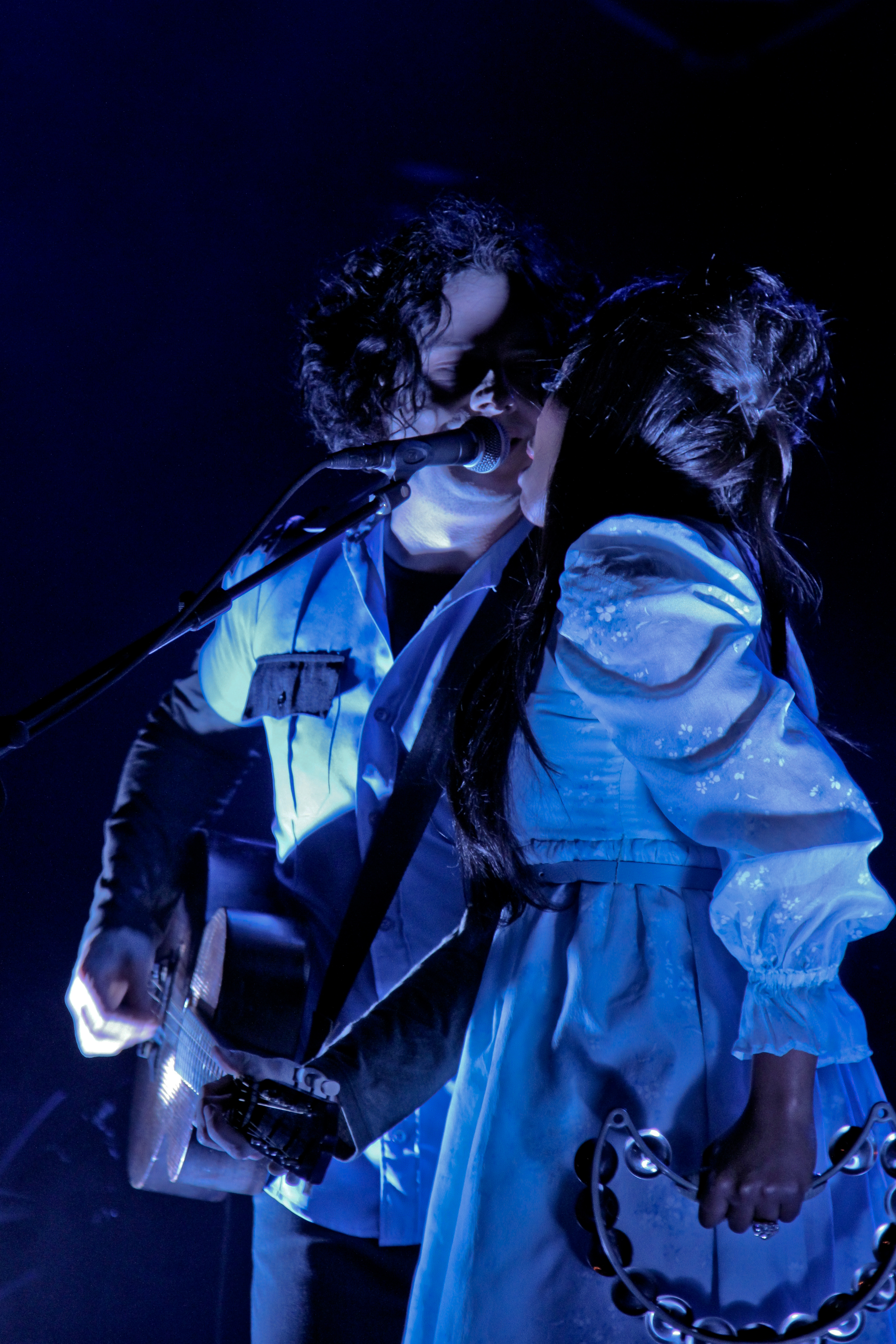

Background information
- Born: Accra, Ghana
- Origin: Nashville. Tennessee, U.S.
- Genres: Pop, R&B, Americana
- Occupations: Singer, songwriter
- Years active: 1998–present
- Labels: Thirty Tigers; Spongebath; Polydor; Rykodisc
- Formerly of: Sam & Ruby
- Website: rubyamanfu.com

Eyram Ruby Amanfu Ashworth is an American recording artist based in Nashville. Amanfu has released seven studio albums and multiple singles. She is known for being one half of the duo Sam & Ruby, whose album was named Associated Press Album of the Year in 2009. Amanfu is also known for her collaborations with Jack White in his all-female band, The Peacocks, and has widely appeared on his critically acclaimed solo albums, Blunderbuss and Lazaretto. In 2020 and 2022, Amanfu was nominated for the Grammy Award for Song of the Year for co-writing "Hard Place" by H.E.R. and "A Beautiful Noise" by Alicia Keys and Brandi Carlile, and was nominated for a Soul Train Music Award for The Ashford & Simpson Songwriter's Award.

Outside of her musical career, Amanfu is an actress, civil activist, an elected Recording Academy Board Governor, private chef, and food blogger.

== Early life and education ==
Ruby Amanfu was born in Accra, Ghana to a tight-knit musical family of five. When she was three years old, her father moved the family to Nashville, Tennessee, where from an early age she flourished among the sights and sounds of the Music City. She entered and won her first school talent show in the third grade with an original song she wrote during recess.

Entering many literary competitions in middle and high school, Amanfu honed her lyric and creative writing skills. She was educated in the private and magnet school systems and attended Hume-Fogg Academic Magnet High School, whose premiere Fine Arts program afforded her an on-site studio where she had the opportunity to write and record her own songs.

In her second year of high school, Amanfu was chosen for The Nashville Symphony Chorus, becoming the youngest member to join the group. She attended Berklee College of Music in Boston, Massachusetts until she transferred to Belmont University in hometown Nashville, Tennessee.

== Career ==
=== Beginnings ===
During high school, Amanfu was introduced to Nashville-based philanthropic couple, Dave and Becky Matthews. The Matthews' took interest in Amanfu's songwriting and supported her first full-length album, So Now The Whole World Knows, with Dave at the helm as engineer and co-producer with Amanfu. The LP was fully recorded at The Matthews' home studio by the time Amanfu finished high school.

Shortly after the release of So Now The Whole World Knows, Amanfu signed to independent record label Spongebath Records. She began working with Grammy nominated singer-songwriter, Tommy Sims, co-author of Eric Clapton’s Change the World. Sims produced and co-wrote Amanfu's first hit single, "Sugah". The prestigious UK A&R publication, The Tip Sheet, named Amanfu's song "Sugah" as their "Tip of the Week." UK record label Polydor Records and Scandinavian music house Murlyn Music Group both became interested in the single and signed her to a co-venture between their companies as well as Interscope Records in the U.S.

While on Polydor, Amanfu released her second album, Smoke & Honey (Polydor 2003). Her hit "Sugah", from the album reached number three on the US Pop Airplay Charts and number 32 on the UK Singles Charts.

=== Sam & Ruby Duo ===
Amanfu met fellow musician Sam Brooker at a writer's round in Nashville in 1999. The two became fast friends and in 2002, the pair penned their first song, "The Here and The Now." Amanfu wrote a majority of the duo's lyrics and melody and Brooker the music. The pair was invited by friend and musician, Dan Dyer, to open for him at Saxon Pub in Austin, TX during South by Southwest. From then on Amanfu and Brooker became Sam & Ruby. The duo toured relentlessly in late 2006 through late 2009, including subsequent appearances at Voodoo Experience. They released their first LP entitled The Here and The Now on Rykodisc Records in 2009. The Associated Press named the album in the top ten of their "Best Albums of 2009" list. Amanfu and Brooker went on to release an EP entitled Press On in February 2010.

=== Collaborations ===
Post-Sam & Ruby, Amanfu collaborated with artists as diverse as H.E.R., Jack White, Norah Jones, Jason Isbell, and Sara Bareilles.

She co-wrote songs with underground hip-hop band, Mission, which included the cult favorite, "Now I Shine". Amanfu co-wrote the song "Heaven's My Home" with Katie Herzig, which was performed by The Duhks and nominated for a 2007 Grammy award for Best Country Performance.

In 2008, Amanfu sang a duet with Patti LaBelle at the Essence Music Festival in New Orleans, Louisiana.

Amanfu sang backup on Wanda Jackson's 2011 promotional tour for her album, The Party Ain't Over, produced by Jack White. Together, they performed "Shakin' All Over" on the Late Show with David Letterman and "Funnel of Love" on Conan.

Amanfu appeared on NBC's vocal competition, The Sing Off Season 3, as part of The Collective. The group consists of nine Nashville independent artists, including former duo partner, Sam Brooker.

Amanfu and Jack White collaborated on White's first solo album, Blunderbuss, which received a Gold Record for over 500,000 sales. The first single, "Love Interruption", highlights an expressive duet between Jack and Ruby, which they later performed together at the Grammys. The song premiered on January 30, 2012, the same day Amanfu released The Simple Sessions. This four-song EP was produced by Charlie Peacock. During his tour for the album, White employed the Peacocks, an all-female band consisting of Amanfu, Carla Azar, Lillie Mae Rische, Maggie Björklund, Brooke Waggoner, and alternating bassists Bryn Davies and Catherine Popper. Amanfu also sang several tracks on Jack's second album, Lazaretto.

In 2014, Amanfu joined Hozier on a six-week US tour and appeared with him on Saturday Night Live.

She joined friend Reese Witherspoon as a musical guest at the Nashville native's first Draper James store opening party on October 28, 2015. She performed alongside Lee Ann Womack to a crowd of A-list Nashville locals, including Faith Hill, Sheryl Crow, Lily Aldridge, Nathan Followill, Jessie Baylin, Kacey Musgraves, singer Cam and Reba McEntire.

Amanfu performed alongside Norah Jones for select US tour dates in 2016, as well as her own shows and appearances at festivals.

In 2016, Billboard did a story on Amanfu detailing her contribution to Beyoncé's album, Lemonade. Amanfu sings the haunting, operatic vocals on the Jack White-produced track titled "Don't Hurt Yourself."

In 2018, Amanfu co-wrote two songs on the critically acclaimed project, I Used To Know Her: Part 2, released by multi-Grammy-winning artist, H.E.R. The song titles are "Fate" and "Hard Place", the latter of which was performed live on the 61st Grammy Awards in 2019.

Amanfu's other musical collaborators include John Prine, Brandi Carlile, Dan Wilson, Yola, Ben Folds, KT Tunstall, Bloodshy & Avant, Chris Thile, and Tommy Sims. In 2019, Amanfu joined Carlile and friends in Riviera Maya, Mexico for Girls Just Wanna Weekend music festival. In 2020, Ruby co-wrote "A Beautiful Noise" with 7 other female writers – Alicia Keys, Brandi Carlile, Brandy Clark, Hillary Lindsey, Lori McKenna, Hailey Whitters and Linda Perry – and the song was performed by Keys and Carlile with the purpose of inspiring American voters to vote in the 2020 presidential election.

=== Solo career ===
On October 15, 2013, Amanfu released a double single that featured the tracks "Bluff" and "Love Out Loud". "Bluff" was written by Amanfu and Katie Herzig and produced by Butterfly Boucher and Herzig. "Love Out Loud" was written by Amanfu along with Shannon Sanders and Drew Ramsey, and was produced by Thom Donovan with additional production by Amanfu.

On August 28, 2015, Amanfu released her solo album Standing Still (Thirty Tigers/Rival & Co 2015), produced by Mark Howard (Bob Dylan, Neil Young, Emmylou Harris) and Austin Scaggs, with guest producer Patrick Carney of The Black Keys who produced single "Shadow on the Wall," originally by Brandi Carlile. Standing Still consists mainly of deep cuts by an eclectic array of songwriters and artists, from Woody Guthrie to Richard Hawley. Some highlights include Bob Dylan's "Not Dark Yet," and a reinterpretation of Kanye West’s "Streetlights." The intimate new album was created in just five days, while Amanfu and a six-piece band recorded and lived in a secluded log cabin in the rolling hills of Tennessee. The entire album was recorded live.

In 2017, Amanfu performed at Lincoln Center's Kaplan Penthouse, making it her second performance at Lincoln Center.

Amanfu has performed as a solo artist in several music festivals including Voodoo Music + Arts Experience, Americana Fest, Cayamo, Newport Folk Festival, Pilgrimage Festival, Music City Food + Wine's Harvest Night and Girls Just Wanna Weekend. Amanfu orchestrated her own fest called Ruby & Friends in Nashville for 2 years at the reputable venue, 3rd & Lindsley in both 2016 and 2017.

In 2020, she was featured in the soundtrack for The Chosen, a live-action recreation of the gospel narratives that is notable for being the #1 crowdfunded media project of all time. A song on which she is featured as the vocalist, "Walk On the Water", is the show's title theme.

== Reception ==
Amanfu has received critical acclaim from national outlets such as Rolling Stone, who confirmed that Amanfu has "Plenty of gospel power, delivering measured doses (who) never overusing with her soulful, richly textured voice, letting the songs tell the story." Billboard, praised Amanfu as "Nashville's next Indie Star," and NPR’s First Listen, who called Amanfu "magnetic." Ann Powers tweeted "All about the chills when @RubyAmanfu sings," while Jon Pareles included Amanfu in his New York Times playlist in January 2016. Local publications from her hometown Nashville, including The Tennessean and Nashville Scene, as well as some of the artists that inspired the album, such as Brandi Carlile, also praised Amanfu for her honest voice and character.

== Other ventures ==
Amanfu models for Draper James and was featured in Elle magazine's June 2015 issue as a model for Draper James alongside Reese Witherspoon.

Amanfu was named one of Southern Living's Best Dressed Southerners of 2015, and was one of Nashville Lifestyles’ 25 Most Beautiful People of 2015,

In 2016, Amanfu was a featured guest on friend Patricia Heaton's cooking show, Patricia Heaton Parties, on the Food Network.

In 2017, Amanfu appeared in two episodes of Nashville as herself where she performed her original songs and acted alongside Joseph D. Jones.

In 2018, Amanfu was featured on friend Andrew Zimmern's show, The Zimmern List, which aired on Travel Channel. Amanfu and Zimmern became fast friends in 2015 after meeting at Music City Food + Wine Festival in Nashville.

== Philanthropy ==
Amanfu performed at "Girls Just Wanna Have Funds" charity event in Nashville in October 2015 to support the Nashville YWCA. In addition, Amanfu supports many other local charities, including Thistle Farms/Magdalene, the Nashville Rescue Mission, Hands On Nashville, Nashville public television, Second Harvest Food Bank, Soles 4 Souls, Vanderbilt Children's Hospital, and eXile International.

== Personal life ==
On September 3, 2017, Amanfu married fellow musician Sam Ashworth.

== Works ==
=== Discography ===
- So Now The Whole World Knows (Lost Frogs Records 1998)
- Smoke & Honey (Polydor UK 2003)
- "Sam & Ruby" EP (2006)
- The Here and The Now (2009)
- Press On (2010)
- "The Simple Sessions" EP (Twenty Ten Music 2012)
- "Bluff" Single (2013)
- "Love Out Loud" Single (2013)
- Standing Still (2015)
- "Turn Our Eyes Away" Single (2015)
- "True Colors" Single (2018)
- "Fantastic Like Magic" Single (2018)
- The Collections Volume I (2019)
- The Collections Volume II (2019)
- The Collections Volume III (2019)
- "House of the Rising Sun" Single (2019)
- "This Holiday" Single (2019)
- "'Tis the Season" Single (2019)

=== Film and television placements ===
- The Secret Life of Bees – "Heaven's My Home" by Sam & Ruby
- Pretty Little Liars – "Turn Our Eyes Away" by Trent Dabbs with Ruby Amanfu
- Hope Springs – "Ain't Love Something" by Sam & Ruby
- Little Fires Everywhere – "Bitch" by Ruby Amanfu
- Community - In the fifth season episode "Basic Intergluteal Numismatics", Amanfu provided backing vocals for an original Ben Folds track, titled "Ass Crack Bandit". A short version appears in the episode, and a 4-minute version was released on YouTube.
- The Chosen - "Walk On the Water" by Dan Haseltine & Matthew S. Nelson feat. Ruby Amanfu. The song is the show's title theme, appearing on every episode.
