= Sighommi =

2024 single by The Smashing Pumpkins

Single by the Smashing Pumpkins

from the album Aghori Mhori Mei
- Released: August 2, 2024
- Recorded: 2022–2024
- Genre: Alternative rock
- Length: 2:55
- Label: Martha's Music; Thirty Tigers
- Songwriter: Billy Corgan
- Producer: Billy Corgan

The Smashing Pumpkins singles chronology
"Mayonaise" (2023)	"Sighommi" (2024)	"Who Goes There" (2024)

"Sighommi" is a song by the American alternative rock band the Smashing Pumpkins. It was released as the first single from their thirteenth studio album, Aghori Mhori Mei on August 2, 2024.

Written and produced by Billy Corgan, musically "Sighommi" is characterized by an up-tempo rock production. Upon release of the album, critics considered the song a strong single due to its radio friendly sound amongst the album's heavier tracks.

As the first single from Aghori Mhori Mei, "Sighommi" was released by Martha's Music to United States alternative and rock format radio stations on August 2, 2024. It was the number one most-added track to these formats in its first week of release. Commercially the single peaked at number five on the Hot Hard Rock Songs chart.

== Background and release ==
The Smashing Pumpkins started work on Aghori Mhori Mei in late 2022, after production on the band's twelfth studio album Atum: A Rock Opera in Three Acts (2022–2023) was completed. The album was billed as a "rock and roll guitar record" by Corgan in 2024.

The album had no singles prior to release of the album. On August 2, 2024, "Sighommi" was announced as the first single from the album to be released. Released through Martha's Music to alternative and rock format radio stations in the United States, "Sighommi" was the number one most-added track to these formats in its first week of release.

== Critical reception ==
Beats Per Minute gave the song a positive review in its review of the parent album. In their review they considered the track to be "pure euphoria" and suggested the song was "chromatic in its Deftones-like power". Kerrang! praised the song as "excitable and invigorated" in their review of the album. Sputnikmusic called the track a "rollicking radio-friendly banger" and praised Katie Cole's backing vocals.

=== Year-end lists ===
Select year-end rankings for Sighommi
Publication/critic	Accolade	Rank	Ref.
Loudwire	The 67 Best Rock + Metal Songs of 2024	—N/a	

== Track listing ==
All tracks are written by Billy Corgan.

No.	Title	Length
1.	"Sighommi"	2:55

== Personnel ==
The Smashing Pumpkins

- Billy Corgan – vocals, guitar, bass guitar, keyboards
- Jimmy Chamberlin – drums
- James Iha – guitar

Additional personnel

- Katie Cole – backing vocals
- Howard Willing – mixing
- Andrew Scheps – mixing

== Charts ==
=== Weekly charts ===
Weekly chart performance for "Sighommi"
Chart (2024)	Peak position
Canada Mainstream Rock (Billboard Canada)	7
Canada Rock (Billboard)	25
US Alternative Airplay (Billboard)	14
US Hot Hard Rock Songs (Billboard)	5
US Mainstream Rock Airplay (Billboard)	17
US Rock & Alternative Airplay (Billboard)	12

=== Year-end charts ===
Year-end chart performance for "Sighommi"
Chart (2025)	Position
Canada Mainstream Rock (Billboard)	26

== Release history ==
Release history for Sighommi
Region	Date	Format(s)	Label(s)	Ref.
United States	August 2, 2024	alternative radio	Martha's Music	
United States	August 2, 2024	rock radio	Martha's Music	
Various	August 2, 2024	digital download; streaming	Martha's Music	
