= Boarding House Reach =

Studio album by Jack White
- Released: March 23, 2018
- Recorded: 2017
- Studios: Third Man, Nashville; Sear Sound, New York City; Capitol, Hollywood, California
- Genres: Blues rock; experimental rock
- Length: 44:07
- Labels: Third Man; Columbia; XL
- Producer: Jack White

Jack White chronology
Acoustic Recordings 1998–2016 (2016)	Boarding House Reach (2018)	Fear of the Dawn (2022)

Singles from Boarding House Reach
- 1. "Connected by Love" Released: January 10, 2018; 2. "Corporation" Released: January 26, 2018; 3. "Over and Over and Over" Released: March 1, 2018; 4. "Ice Station Zebra" Released: March 21, 2018

Alternate cover art
- Third Man Records Vault vinyl edition cover art

Boarding House Reach is the third studio album by American rock musician Jack White. It was released on March 23, 2018, through Third Man Records, Columbia Records, and XL Recordings. The album was written in Nashville and recorded throughout 2017 at Third Man Studio in Nashville, Sear Sound in New York City, and Capitol Studios in Los Angeles.

"Connected by Love" and "Respect Commander" were released together as a double single on January 10. "Corporation", "Over and Over and Over", and "Ice Station Zebra" were released as singles afterward.

Boarding House Reach received generally positive reviews, with its unorthodox production and style noted as a departure from White's previous studio albums and projects. While critics mainly praised the album for its ambition, experimentalism and artistic approach, its criticisms mainly focused on its inconsistency and production. The album performed well commercially, topping the U.S. Billboard 200 upon release, making it White's third number-one album on that chart. Elsewhere, it was a number-one album in Canada and reached number five in Scotland, Switzerland, and the United Kingdom.

== Recording and production ==
In March 2017, in an interview with The New Yorker, White revealed that he was in the process of writing new music. He had set up shop in a small apartment in Nashville, Tennessee, where he recorded on a reel-to-reel tape recorder which he purchased when he was fourteen. His goal was "to try to write songs where I can't be heard by the next-door neighbor. And I want to write like Michael Jackson would write — instead of writing parts on the instruments or humming melodies, you think of them. To do everything in my head and to do it in silence and use only one room." He spent several hours each day crafting in this space. On July 27, White announced that he was working on his third solo album, with recording sessions taking place in New York City and Los Angeles. In November, during a keynote speech at the Making Vinyl conference in Detroit, he offered an update on the album, saying that it was nearly completed and required only a few more additions for completion. He noted it as a "bizarre" record, saying "I've just got to let it settle. I need to listen to it by myself. I haven't been able to listen to it by myself for awhile."

Boarding House Reach was recorded throughout 2017 at Third Man Studio in Nashville, Sear Sound in New York City, and Capitol Studios in Los Angeles. White produced and co-mixed the album and played guitars, drums, organs, and synthesizers, while also acting as the vocalist. He performed alongside a brand new group of session musicians who had previously worked with several notable musical talents in the past. "Connected by Love" was the first song to be written for the album. It was originally titled "Infected by Love", but White renamed the track after realizing that not everyone would understand the metaphor of the title. The track "Over and Over and Over" was originally written in 2005 as a possible song for the White Stripes, one of White's former bands. It was also nearly recorded in collaboration with American rapper Jay-Z and almost recorded with another one of White's bands, the Raconteurs; the song was ultimately shelved until the recording sessions for Boarding House Reach.

== Promotion and release ==
On December 12, 2017, White released a teaser video for the album titled "Servings and Portions from My Boarding House Reach". It was a sound collage of tracks from Boarding House Reach, displaying the many sounds and styles the album contained. A teaser for the song "Connected by Love" was released on January 9, 2018. The next day, "Connected by Love" was premiered on Zane Lowe's radio show on Beats 1, with a music video for the song also being released on the same day. The album track "Respect Commander" was also released as the b-side to the song. Both songs were also released together on a 7" vinyl single through Third Man Records on the same day. A tri-color version of the single was made available exclusively on January 13 at the Third Man record stores in Detroit and Nashville for that day only. White later released "Corporation" as a promotional single on January 26. "Over and Over and Over" was released as the album's second non-promotional single on March 1.

Boarding House Reach was released on March 23, 2018, through White's own Third Man Records as well as Columbia Records and XL Recordings. A limited edition vinyl version was made available to customers of the Third Man Records Vault service. The package features a different cover art, light-up vinyl record, 7" colored vinyl single of demos for the tracks "Connected by Love" and "Why Walk a Dog?", and photographs taken during the recording sessions of the album. There are nine different pressings of the standard vinyl LP, each of which uses a different spoken word intro for the song "Get in the Mind Shaft." The only visible way to spot them is the number after the catalogue number etched in the runout groove of Side 2; the seventh, TMR-540-B - 2679, starts with, "When I was young I went into an abandoned house...", which was the one used for the CD and the Vault LP.

== Critical reception ==
Professional ratings
Aggregate scores
Source	Rating
AnyDecentMusic?	6.6/10
Metacritic	74/100
Review scores
Source	Rating
AllMusic	3.5/5 stars
The A.V. Club	B
The Daily Telegraph	4/5 stars
The Guardian	3/5 stars
The Independent	3/5 stars
NME	5/5 stars
Pitchfork	4.7/10
Q	4/5 stars
Rolling Stone	3.5/5 stars
The Times	4/5 stars

According to the review aggregator Metacritic, Boarding House Reach received "generally favorable reviews" based on a weighted average score of 74 out of 100 from 31 critic scores.

== Commercial performance ==
Boarding House Reach debuted at number one on the US Billboard 200 with 124,000 album-equivalent units—121,000 of that figure being pure album sales. It is White's third US number-one album as a solo artist.

== Track listing ==
All tracks are written by Jack White III, except "Humoresque", music by Antonín Dvořák, lyrics by Howard Johnson, arranged by Jack White III

No.	Title	Length
1.	"Connected by Love"	4:37
2.	"Why Walk a Dog?"	2:29
3.	"Corporation"	5:39
4.	"Abulia and Akrasia"	1:28
5.	"Hypermisophoniac"	3:34
6.	"Ice Station Zebra"	3:59
7.	"Over and Over and Over"	3:36
8.	"Everything You've Ever Learned"	2:13
9.	"Respect Commander"	4:33
10.	"Ezmerelda Steals the Show"	1:42
11.	"Get in the Mind Shaft"	4:13
12.	"What's Done Is Done"	2:54
13.	"Humoresque"	3:10
Total length:		44:07

Third Man Records Vault edition bonus 7"
No.	Title	Length
1.	"Infected by Love" (demo version of "Connected by Love")
2.	"Why Walk a Dog?" (demo)

== Personnel ==
Personnel adapted from album liner notes.

Primary artist

- Jack White – vocals (except track 4), electric guitar (tracks 2, 3, 5–7, 9, 11, 12), acoustic drums (tracks 3, 6, 8, 9), synthesizer (tracks 1, 3, 5, 8), acoustic guitar (tracks 1, 10, 12), electronic drums (track 6), bass (track 6), piano (track 6), tambourine (track 7), organ (track 10)

Session musicians

- Bobby Allende – percussion (tracks 1–3, 7–9), acoustic drums (track 8)
- Carla Azar – acoustic drums (tracks 5, 6, 11, 12), electronic drums (tracks 6, 9, 11, 12)
- Anthony “Brew” Brewster – synthesizer (tracks 5, 6, 9, 11, 12), Hammond organ (track 12)
- Justin Carpenter – trombone (track 4)
- Louis Cato – acoustic drums (tracks 1, 7, 13), electronic drums (tracks 2, 3, 9), acoustic guitar (track 13), bass (track 13)
- Dominic Davis – upright bass (track 4)
- Neal Evans – synthesizer (tracks 1–3, 7–9), Hammond organ (track 1), piano (track 13)
- Joshua Gillis – acoustic guitar (track 4)
- DJ Harrison – synthesizer (tracks 1, 2, 7, 8), keyboards (track 3)
- Daru Jones – drums (tracks 4, 7)
- Fats Kaplin – fiddle (track 4)
- Charlotte Kemp Muhl – electric bass (tracks 1–4, 7–9), six-string bass (track 2)
- Neil Konouchi – tuba (track 4)
- Ann McCrary – backing vocals (tracks 1, 3, 11)
- Quincy McCrary – piano (tracks 5, 6, 11), synthesizer (tracks 9, 11)
- Regina McCrary – backing vocals (track 1, 3, 11)
- Gianluca Braccio Montone – piano samples (track 3)
- Ian Montone – piano samples (track 3)
- NeonPhoenix – electric bass (tracks 5, 6, 9, 11, 12)
- Justin Porée – percussion (tracks 5, 6, 9, 11, 12), udu (track 6)
- Esther Rose – backing vocals (tracks 11, 12)
- Kevin Smith – trumpet (track 4)
- C. W. Stoneking – spoken word (track 4)
- Brooke Waggoner – piano (track 4)

Technical personnel

- Chandler Harrod – engineering assistance (track 6, 9, 11, 12)
- Bob Ludwig – master engineering
- Vance Powell – record engineering
- Ben Schmitz – engineering assistance (tracks 1–4, 7–8, 13)
- Bill Skibbe – record engineering (except track 10), mixing
- Joshua V. Smith – engineering (tracks 1–9, 11, 13), engineering assistance (track 12), mixing
- Grant Valentine – engineering assistance (tracks 1–4, 7–8, 13)
- Jack White – production, engineering (tracks 1, 8, 10–11), mixing

== Charts ==
=== Weekly charts ===
Chart (2018)	Peak position
Australian Albums (ARIA)	11
Austrian Albums (Ö3 Austria)	8
Belgian Albums (Ultratop Flanders)	10
Belgian Albums (Ultratop Wallonia)	42
Canadian Albums (Billboard)	1
Croatian International Albums (HDU)	1
Czech Albums (ČNS IFPI)	16
Danish Albums (Hitlisten)	40
Dutch Albums (Album Top 100)	10
Finnish Albums (Suomen virallinen lista)	19
German Albums (Offizielle Top 100)	17
Irish Albums (IRMA)	17
Italian Albums (FIMI)	32
Japan Hot Albums (Billboard Japan)	99
Japanese Albums (Oricon)	52
New Zealand Albums (RMNZ)	25
Polish Albums (ZPAV)	11
Scottish Albums (Official Charts)	5
Spanish Albums (PROMUSICAE)	19
Swiss Albums (Schweizer Hitparade)	5
UK Albums (Official Charts)	5
US Billboard 200	1
US Top Alternative Albums (Billboard)	1
US Top Rock Albums (Billboard)	1

=== Year-end charts ===
Chart (2018)	Position
Belgian Albums (Ultratop Flanders)	141
US Top Rock Albums (Billboard)	45
