= Connected by Love =

2018 single by Jack White

Single by Jack White

from the album Boarding House Reach
- B-side: "Respect Commander"
- Released: January 10, 2018
- Recorded: 2017
- Genre: Blues rock; experimental rock
- Length: 4:38
- Label: Third Man; XL; Columbia
- Songwriter: Jack White
- Producer: Jack White

Jack White singles chronology
"Battle Cry" (2017)	"Connected by Love" (2018)	"Corporation" (2018)

Music video
- "Connected by Love" on YouTube

"Connected by Love" is a song by American rock musician Jack White, issued as the lead single from his third studio album Boarding House Reach. The song peaked at #18 on the Billboard Alternative Songs chart in 2018. Its opening lyrics recall blues songs in their content, with NPR's Bob Boilen also relating it to Otis Redding's style:

Woman, don't you know what I'm suffering from?

Ease my pain, make it wash on with the rain

Relieve me and put it up on your shelf

Take it away, and give it to somebody else

Entertainment Weekly's Madison Vain called it "a searing, organ-lined plea to a former flame" and "thrillingly weird".

On April 14, 2018, Jack White performed "Connected by Love" on Saturday Night Live.

== Music video ==
The official music video for "Connected by Love" was directed by Pasqual Gutierrez.

== Chart positions ==
Chart (2018)	Peak position
US Alternative Airplay (Billboard)	18
US Hot Rock & Alternative Songs (Billboard)	27
