= Love Interruption =

- Digital release and 7-inch single cover art

Single by Jack White

from the album Blunderbuss
- B-side: "Machine Gun Silhouette"
- Released: January 31, 2012
- Recorded: December 7, 2011
- Studio: Third Man, Nashville, Tennessee
- Genre: Americana; blues
- Length: 2:36
- Label: Third Man; Columbia; XL
- Songwriter: White
- Producer: White

Jack White singles chronology
"Fly Farm Blues" (2009)	"Love Interruption" (2012)	"Sixteen Saltines" (2012)

"Love Interruption" is a song by American musician Jack White. It was released by XL Recordings, Columbia Records, and Third Man Records as the lead single from his debut solo studio album, Blunderbuss (2012). The song was made available for digital download on January 31, 2012 and as a 7-inch vinyl single on February 7. Written and produced by White, the track is an Americana song and a blues ballad with lyrics that explore love using violent imagery. It features vocals from White and Ruby Amanfu, and its instrumentation includes the bass clarinet, the Wurlitzer electric piano, and the acoustic guitar. The song received positive reviews from critics, who contrasted it with musical elements prominent in White's earlier musical projects, especially the White Stripes. "Love Interruption" was the first single White released after the White Stripes dissolved, and it reached record charts in multiple countries.

An accompanying music video for "Love Interruption" was uploaded to White's YouTube channel and Vevo on February 14. Directed by the singer, it depicts White, Amanfu and a backing band performing the song. White has performed "Love Interruption" live on numerous occasions, including on Saturday Night Live and at the 55th Annual Grammy Awards, and the song has been covered by James Wolpert and First Aid Kit. In addition to appearing on Blunderbuss, "Love Interruption" is featured on White's compilation album Acoustic Recordings 1998–2016.

== Production and release ==
"Love Interruption" was recorded at Third Man Studio in Nashville, Tennessee on December 7, 2011. Multiple versions of the song were created during its production: one with a full backing band and another that did not feature drums. The latter was ultimately used in the final version of the track. This recording was created in a single take, while the clarinet and bass clarinet were added after the live session.

"Love Interruption" was the first single White released after rock duo the White Stripes, of which he was a member, broke up in 2011. On January 30, 2012, White announced his debut album Blunderbuss along with the release of its lead single, "Love Interruption"; a free stream of the song was offered on his website. The track was released for digital download outside of Europe on January 31 at 12:00 a.m. (EST). On February 7, it was released as a 7-inch vinyl single with the B-side "Machine Gun Silhoutte". "Love Interruption" and its B-side were made available for digital download in Europe on February 25 at 12:01 a.m. (GMT). The song was released through Third Man Records, Columbia Records, and XL Recordings.

== Composition and lyrics ==
[A]s a songwriter, it's really dangerous to use the word love in a song. It's a word that has been used in songs so many millions of times before, and it's the most popular topic to ever write about. So I thought that if I was going to be brave enough to actually use the word love in a song, I better be trying to make people think about it—and make myself think about it. I really wanted to stir up the notion of what love could mean, and what we really want when we say that word.

—Jack White for Interview

Rolling Stone described "Love Interruption" as a blues ballad, and Joe Robinson of Diffuser.fm characterized it as "gospel-infused Americana". The song is two minutes and 36 seconds in length, and it consists of White harmonizing with Ruby Amanfu, creating a melody that utilizes elements of country soul. It features the bass clarinet and a prominent Wurlitzer electric piano—played by Emily Bowland and Brooke Waggoner, respectively—while acoustic guitar chords work alongside the piano to drive the song. According to sheet music published by Universal Music Publishing Group, the song is written in the key of E major in common time, with a tempo of 96 beats per minute.

In an interview with Dimitri Ehrlich and Buzz Aldrin for the magazine Interview, White explained that the song's title refers to love's tendency to "get... in the way of itself", elaborating: "We want things so much that we sabotage them". He was cautious about the use of the word "love", believing that he would have to differentiate it from its use in other songs. To that end, "Love Interruption" features "gory" lyrics in which a narrator expresses desires to be treated violently by "love": "I want love to roll me over slowly, stick a knife inside me and twist it all around". Pitchfork's Ryan Dombal viewed the line "I won't let love disrupt, corrupt, or interrupt me anymore" as an indication that the song is "a form of self discipline" rather than "some masochistic fantasy".

== Reception ==
The song was met with favorable reviews from critics. Jon Dolan of Rolling Stone gave the song a rating of 3.5 out of 5 stars, describing it as a "loopy little soul sketch" and stating that the song's "organ spritz and puppy-eyed Casio bassoon evoke 'Son of a Preacher Man'". He spoke favorably of Amanfu's vocals, finding that her "harried backing warble fits [the] song". Jem Aswad of Billboard described "Love Interruption" as "an unusual but tantalizing lead track" and concluded that it "leaves you lusting for more." Rebecca Schiller of NME described the song as "a drumless, minimalist affair based on the chord progression of the Beta Band's 'Dry The Rain'". She said that the track's "intensity is in the lyrics and its powerful, repetitive chorus" and remarked, "I've heard it three times and I can't get a second of it out of my head."

Critics drew comparisons between "Love Interruption" and music produced under White's previous musical projects, especially the White Stripes. Spin's David Marchese found the song to differ from White's previous "thunderous rock" sound, while Aswad commented that it resembles "deeper cuts on the last few White Stripes albums". Citing the song's instrumentation, Michael Roffman of Consequence of Sound said that "Love Interruption" "didn't necessarily relive those feelings of seeing" the White Stripes. Schiller found that the "jolliness" on songs produced under the Dead Weather and the Raconteurs is absent on "Love Interruption", as is any "trademark [White] riffing". Dolan stated that the song "adds an awkwardly personal wrinkle to the White Stripes' errant primitivism".

== Promotion and other usage ==
An accompanying music video for "Love Interruption", which White directed, was uploaded to Vevo and White's YouTube channel on February 14, 2012. Described by Billboard's Jillian Mapes as a "hazy, self-directed performance clip", the video consists of White and Amanfu singing "Love Interruption" alongside a backing band. A dog is briefly present at the beginning of the video.

The song has been featured in setlists for White's live performances. On the March 3, 2012 episode of Saturday Night Live, White performed "Love Interruption" with Amanfu and his all-female backing band the Peacocks. In 2013, he performed the song at the 55th Annual Grammy Awards alongside the same band. During a concert in London in 2014, White dedicated a performance of the song to touring drummer Isaiah "Ikey" Owens, who had died of a heart attack during the tour. In March 2018, he included "Love Interruption" in the setlist for his first live performance since 2016, a concert at Third Man Records in Nashville, Tennessee. Later that year, he performed "Love Interruption" at Lollapalooza.

James Wolpert covered "Love Interruption" for his audition for season 5 of the American version of The Voice. The song was later covered by the band First Aid Kit when they appeared on Triple J's radio program in 2014. Consequence of Sound's Alex Young described the cover as a "twangy rendition" of the song. "Love Interruption" also appears on the singer's 2016 compilation album Acoustic Recordings 1998–2016.

== Track listing ==
Digital download and 7-inch single

1. "Love Interruption"
2. "Machine Gun Silhouette"

== Personnel ==
Credits adapted from the liner notes of the single's vinyl release.

"Love Interruption"

- Jack White – lead vocals, acoustic guitar, writer (music and lyrics), producer, mixing
- Ruby Amanfu – background vocals
- Brooke Waggoner – Wurlitzer electric piano
- Emily Bowland – clarinet, bass clarinet
- Vance Powell – mixing, recording
- Joshua V. Smith – assistant in mixing and recording

"Machine Gun Silhouette"

- Jack White – vocals, background vocals, acoustic guitar, electric guitar, writer (music and lyrics), producer, mixing
- Brooke Waggoner – piano
- Mindy Watts – background vocals, assistant in mixing and recording
- Fats Kaplin – fiddle
- Ryan Koenig – background vocals
- Bryn Davies – upright bass
- Olivia Jean – drums
- Master Combs – feathers
- Vance Powell – mixing, recording
- Bob Jones – writer (lyrics)
- Joshua V. Smith – assistant in recording

== Charts ==
=== Weekly charts ===
Weekly chart performance for "Love Interruption"
Chart (2012)	Peak position
Belgium (Ultratip Flanders)	20
Belgium (Ultratip Wallonia)	34
Canada (Canadian Hot 100)	72
Canada Rock (Billboard)	6
Japan (Japan Hot 100) (Billboard)	83
UK Singles (OCC)	126
US Bubbling Under Hot 100 (Billboard)	6
US Hot Rock & Alternative Songs (Billboard)	27

=== Year-end charts ===
Year-end chart performance for "Love Interruption"
Chart (2012)	Position
US Hot Rock Songs (Billboard)	88
