= High Ball Stepper =

Promotional single by Jack White

from the album Lazaretto
- Released: April 1, 2014
- Genre: Instrumental rock; blues rock; garage rock; noise rock
- Length: 3:54
- Label: Third Man
- Songwriter: Jack White
- Producer: Jack White

"High Ball Stepper" is an instrumental track performed by American musician Jack White. It was released as a promotional single from his second studio album, Lazaretto, on April 1, 2014. The song charted in several countries. It was also used for some intros that were used for the US Soccer Team at the 2014 FIFA World Cup in Brazil.

== Charts ==
Chart (2014)	Peak position
Belgium (Ultratip Bubbling Under Flanders)	57
France (SNEP)	199
Mexico Ingles Airplay (Billboard)	35
UK Indie (OCC)	23
US Hot Rock & Alternative Songs (Billboard)	28

== Release history ==
Region	Date h	Label	Format
United States	April 1, 2014	Third Man	Digital download
