= Sixteen Saltines =

Single by Jack White

from the album Blunderbuss
- B-side: "Love Is Blindness"
- Released: March 13, 2012
- Recorded: 2011
- Genre: Garage rock; punk blues
- Length: 2:37
- Label: Third Man; Columbia
- Songwriter(s): Jack White
- Producer(s): Jack White

Jack White singles chronology
"Love Interruption" (2012)	"Sixteen Saltines" (2012)	"Freedom at 21" (2012)

"Sixteen Saltines" is the second single from Jack White's 2012 solo album Blunderbuss. It was when White first played this song on Saturday Night Live that the album had a surge in popularity.

In December 2012, the song was named by Rolling Stone as the eighth-best song of the year.

== Editions ==
Keeping in line with Third Man Records's affinity towards unusual visual and physical concepts, the 12" release of "Sixteen Saltines" uses a clear, hollow record filled with blue liquid. This is the first liquid-filled record to be publicly available; Walt Disney Pictures previously attempted to release a liquid-filled record during promotion of The Black Hole, but the idea was scrapped due to leakage issues with prototypes. The 7" is also available in classic tri-colour like most of the Third Man Records' 7". There is also an unlimited regular black vinyl edition of the same release in 12" and 7".

== Music video ==
In the music video directed by AG Rojas, White sits on a windowsill with his hands tied in front of him with rope as two men painted white surround him while a boy painted in blue watches. The video also contains various clips of children doing random activities and ends with Jack White then tied up in a vehicle that the boy painted in blue is about to set on fire, but the video is cut before any fire is seen.

== Track listing ==
Digital download, 7-inch single, and 12-inch single

1. "Sixteen Saltines" – 2:37
2. "Love Is Blindness" (U2 cover) – 3:18

== Personnel ==
Adapted from "Sixteen Saltines" 7-inch vinyl single liner notes.

"Sixteen Saltines"

- Jack White – lead vocals, electric guitar, writing (music and lyrics), mixing, producer
- Carla Azar – drums, percussion
- Brooke Waggoner – Hammond organ
- Fats Kaplin – fiddle
- Bryn Davies – upright bass
- Vance Powell – recording, mixing
- Joshua V. Smith – recording, assistant in mixing

== Charts ==
Chart (2012)	Peak Position
Belgium (Ultratip Flanders)	16
Belgium (Ultratip Wallonia)	27
Canada (Canadian Hot 100)	93
Canada Rock (Billboard)	17
France (SNEP)	171
Japan (Japan Hot 100)	58
UK Singles (Official Charts Company)	129
US Hot Rock & Alternative Songs (Billboard)	30
US Alternative Airplay (Billboard)	12
