= Acoustic Recordings 1998–2016 =

Compilation album by Jack White
- Released: September 9, 2016
- Studios: Third Man Studios, Nashville, Tennessee
- Genres: Acoustic, blues
- Length: 85:00
- Labels: Third Man, Columbia
- Producer: Jack White

Jack White chronology
Lazaretto (2014)	Acoustic Recordings 1998–2016 (2016)	Boarding House Reach (2018)

Acoustic Recordings 1998–2016 is a compilation album by Jack White, released on September 9, 2016, through White's label Third Man Records. The album is composed of album tracks, B-sides, remixes, alternate versions and previously unreleased tracks he originally recorded for The White Stripes, The Raconteurs, and his own solo career. It was released as a double vinyl LP.

== Track listing ==
All songs by Jack White except where noted.

Side A

1. "Sugar Never Tasted So Good" by The White Stripes
2. "Apple Blossom" (remixed) by The White Stripes
3. "I'm Bound to Pack It Up" (remixed) by The White Stripes
4. "Hotel Yorba" by The White Stripes
5. "We're Going to Be Friends" by The White Stripes
6. "You've Got Her in Your Pocket" by The White Stripes
7. "Well It's True That We Love One Another" by The White Stripes
8. "Never Far Away" (from "Cold Mountain")

Side B

1. "Forever for Her (Is Over for Me)" by The White Stripes
2. "White Moon" by The White Stripes
3. "As Ugly As I Seem" by The White Stripes
4. "City Lights" (previously unreleased) by The White Stripes
5. "Honey, We Can't Afford to Look This Cheap" by The White Stripes
6. "Effect and Cause" by The White Stripes

Side C

1. "Love Is the Truth" (acoustic mix)
2. "Top Yourself (bluegrass version) by The Raconteurs
3. "Carolina Drama (acoustic mix) by The Raconteurs
4. "Love Interruption"
5. "On and On and On"
6. "Machine Gun Silhouette" (acoustic mix)

Side D

1. "Blunderbuss"
2. "Hip (Eponymous) Poor Boy" (alternate mix)
3. "I Guess I Should Go to Sleep" (alternate mix)
4. "Just One Drink" (acoustic mix)
5. "Entitlement"
6. "Want and Able"

== Reception ==
Professional ratings
Review scores
Source	Rating
Pitchfork	(link)
Rolling Stone	(link)
The Guardian	(link)
NME	(link)
AllMusic	(link)

Referencing White's self-sufficient production style, Pitchfork said "Acoustic Recordings stockpiles a great American songbook that can endure even after we're all forced to live off the grid." Giving the album four-out-of-five stars, Rolling Stone said that "you may miss the electric buzz blowing the melancholy away, but this foot stomping music does the job."

== Charts ==
=== Weekly charts ===
Chart (2016)	Peak position
Australian Albums (ARIA)	13
Austrian Albums (Ö3 Austria)	6
Belgian Albums (Ultratop Flanders)	7
Belgian Albums (Ultratop Wallonia)	18
Canadian Albums (Billboard)	18
Dutch Albums (Album Top 100)	22
French Albums (SNEP)	25
German Albums (Offizielle Top 100)	11
Irish Albums (IRMA)	10
Italian Albums (FIMI)	87
New Zealand Albums (RMNZ)	18
Norwegian Albums (VG-lista)	20
Portuguese Albums (AFP)	17
Spanish Albums (Promusicae)	47
Swiss Albums (Schweizer Hitparade)	11
UK Albums (Official Charts)	12
US Billboard 200	8
US Top Rock Albums (Billboard)	4

=== Year-end charts ===
Chart (2016)	Position
Belgian Albums (Ultratop Flanders)	143
US Top Rock Albums (Billboard)	66
