= Brooke Waggoner =

American musician (born 1984)

- Born: May 30, 1984 (age 42)
- Origin: Houston, Texas, US
- Genres: Indie pop; indie folk
- Occupations: Singer-songwriter; musician
- Instruments: Vocals; piano; clavinet; hammond organ; moog synthesizer
- Years active: 2007–present
- Label: Swoon Moon
- Website: brookewaggoner.com

Brooke Waggoner (born May 30, 1984) is an American singer-songwriter from New Orleans, Louisiana, who resides in Nashville, Tennessee.

== Early life ==
Waggoner was born in Houston, Texas, to Lewis Earl and Kris Allyn (Kulcke) Waggoner. She comes from a classical music background with 17 years of formal training. She graduated with a music composition and orchestration degree from Louisiana State University in 2006. After graduating, she left for Nashville and began developing her current music.

== Career (2007–present) ==
Waggoner has released four albums independently, with all music being fully written, orchestrated, and arranged by herself. Her debut release was an EP titled Fresh Pair of Eyes (2007). After touring nationally through the spring of 2008, Waggoner released her second album, Heal for the Honey, in the fall of that year. She continued touring nationally with such artists as Copeland, Bell X1, Owen, Paper Route, and Unwed Sailor. In 2009, she produced her third album, Go Easy Little Doves. The album again debuted at #1 on the iTunes Singer/Songwriter charts. Waggoner spent fall of 2009 and spring of 2010 on tour with such artists as Owl City, Rocky Votolato, and Denison Witmer.

Waggoner has been a part of the long-running and award-winning radio show "NPR's Mountain Stage", appearing multiple times with acts such as Wilco, Au Pair, The Hold Steady, Jerry Douglas, Crooked Still, and others.

Her music has appeared on numerous TV shows such as ABC Family's Greek, Kyle XY, Pretty Little Liars, and Grey's Anatomy, as well as CBS's Ghost Whisperer, and Lifetime's Army Wives.

Waggoner released her first DVD, entitled And the World Opened Up, in 2010. It contains a live performance recorded at Nashville's Art House America in late 2009. Her music from Go Easy Little Doves is presented for the first time with a complete live orchestra. The DVD also features biographical interviews with Waggoner, footage of her musical development, and animated sections. Production is credited to Charlie Peacock.

Waggoner has also produced records for other artists, including the 2010 vinyl release of The Sower by The Champion & His Burning Flame and the 2012 EP The Family Album for Jessica Ripka.

In 2011, Waggoner recorded with Jack White on his first solo album, Blunderbuss. She performed live with White in 2012, including a performance at the Grammys. Waggoner also appears on White's follow-up album, "Lazaretto"

In September 2012, Waggoner was featured in the campaign "30 Songs / 30 Days" to support Half the Sky: Turning Oppression into Opportunity for Women Worldwide, a multi-platform media project inspired by Nicholas Kristof and Sheryl WuDunn's book.

Waggoner followed this with the release of her album Originator on March 5, 2013. After touring with Ron Sexsmith, playing the 2013 SXSW festival, Lollapalooza festival, releasing two music videos and an additional single, she finished the year by playing the Austin City Limits Music Festival.

In 2014, Waggoner signed a deal with Beijing-based label Pocket Records, and toured the entire country of China in partnership with Pocket Records for distribution of her albums Heal for the Honey and Go Easy Little Doves.

During 2015, the Nashville-based chamber music ensemble CHATTERBIRD commissioned Waggoner to compose a piece consisting of instrumentation for woodwinds, strings, and piano entitled "Minor-Born". The piece debuted at Abrasive Media in May 2015 and a second time as part of the Sideshow Fringe Festival in July 2015.

In January 2016, Waggoner's self-produced album Sweven released on her own label, Swoon Moon Music. Flood Magazine called it her "most ambitious work to date".

=== Awards ===
Waggoner was nominated for an Independent Music Award for "Best Folk/Singer-Songwriter Album" in 2009.

Also in 2009, she won the Nashville Music Award for "NBN Emerging Artist" of the year.

== Discography ==
Studio albums

- Heal for the Honey (2008)
- Go Easy Little Doves (2009)
- Originator (2013)
- Sweven (2016)
- Sweven Remixes (2017)

EPs

- Fresh Pair of Eyes (2007)
- B-Sides Collection (2015)

Live albums

- Sing to Me (Live in Boston) (2013)

DVDs

- And the World Opened Up (2010)

Singles

- "Red-Robin Hood" (2010)
- "Baby Shake-em" (2010)
- "I Am Mine (remix)" (2010)
- "So-So (original demo)" (2010)
- "Squint – JT Daly Remix" (2013)
- "The High Wind" (2014)
- "Christmas Moon" (2015)
- "Widow Maker" (2015)

Also appears on

- guest vocals on "Get Mad" by Kyle Andrews (2007)
- string orchestration on "The Weight of Us" by Sanders Bohlke (2009)
- string orchestration on "Closer (to Love)" by Mat Kearney (2009)
- guest vocals on "The Ol' College Try" by Nick Flora (2009)
- vocals & keyboards on "Parkers Chapel" by Hammock (2011)
- guest vocals on Yearbook by Sleeping at Last (2011)
- guest keyboards on Out of the Jar by Stephen Gordon (2012)
- guest Fender Rhodes, Hammond B3, piano, Wurlitzer piano on Blunderbuss by Jack White (2012)
- guest piano w/ Pokey LaFarge on "Red's Theater of the Absurd" from the film The Lone Ranger (2013)
- guest clavinet, Hammond, Moog synthesizer, piano on Lazaretto by Jack White (2014)
- guest piano on Fantasize by Kye Kye (2014)
- orchestration / copyist on "Don't Put Dirt on My Grave" / "Juliette (String & Horn Version)" for ABC's Nashville, episode 215 (2014)
- guest piano w/ Jack White on "I'm Down" by Beck, sheet music book Song Reader (2014)
- string orchestration / copyist on "Impossible Winner" by the Dead Weather (2015)
- string orchestration / copyist on live video version of "Overactor" by Preston Lovinggood (2016)
- guest vocals on "Heart Needs Medicine" by Don Tigra (2016)
- guest piano on Pink Floyd cover "Wish You Were Here" by Cody Jinks (2017)
- guest piano, Hammond B3, Wurlitzer on Modern Plagues by the Whistles & the Bells (2017)
- vocal harmonies on Himalayas by Scott Mulvahill (2018)
- piano on Boarding House Reach by Jack White (2018)
- piano on Laurel Hell by Mitski (2022)
- piano on American Heartbreak by Zach Bryan (2022)
- piano & organ on The Land Is Inhospitable and So Are We by Mitski (2023)
