= Katie Cole =

Australian singer

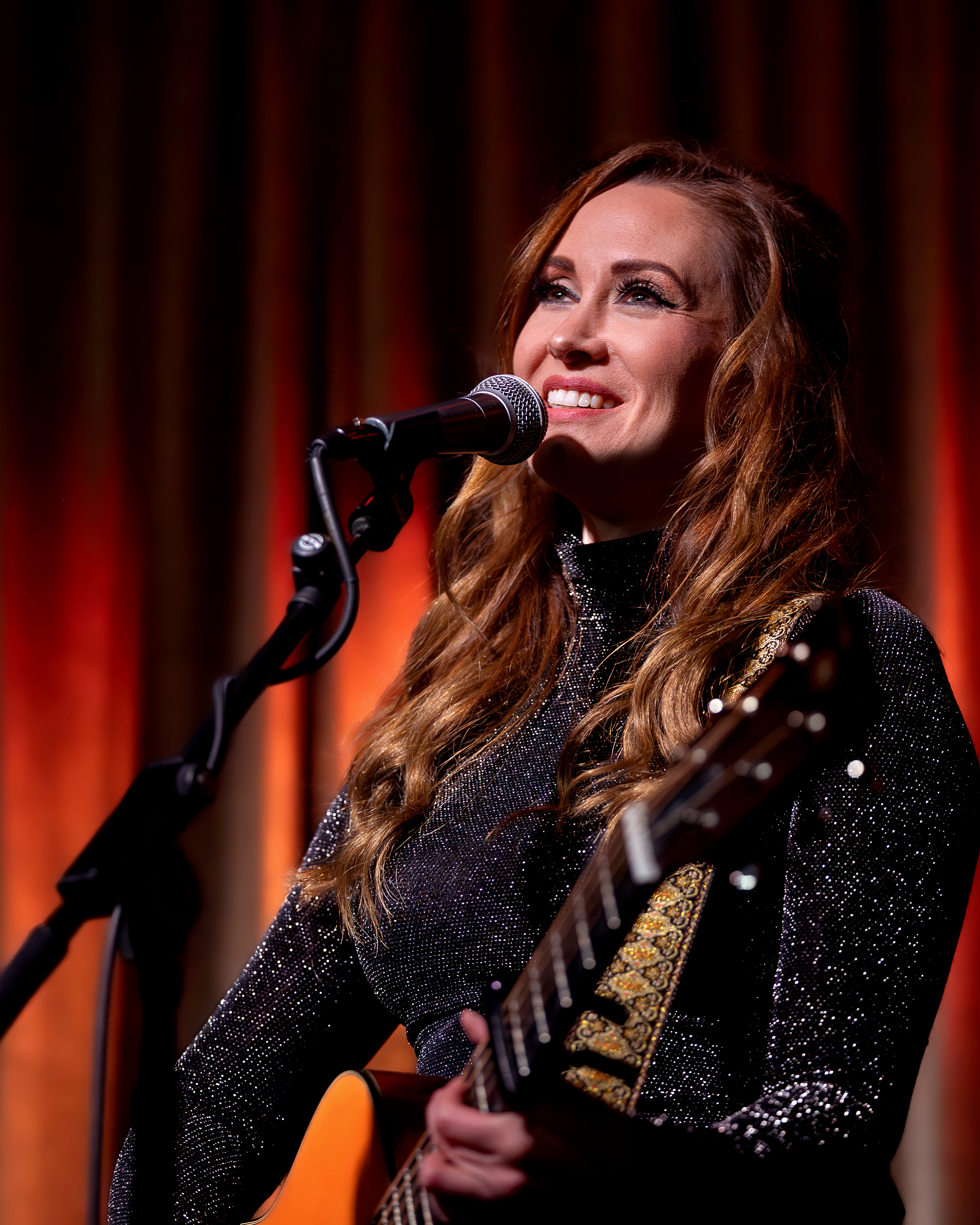
- Cole in 2025

Background information
- Born: Melbourne, Australia
- Genres: Country pop, acoustic, indie, alternative rock
- Occupations: Singer-songwriter; musician
- Instruments: Vocals; guitar; bass; keyboards
- Formerly of: The Smashing Pumpkins
- Website: katiecoleofficial.com

Katie Cole is an Australian singer-songwriter and musician. She was born in Melbourne and her career began with songwriting, touring and recording in Australia. After being contacted by record producer Howard Willing, Cole relocated to Los Angeles, where she currently resides and works. In 2010–2011, Cole released Lost Inside a Moment, an EP produced by Willing. The recording spawned two singles, the title track and "Sunrise", both of which were playlisted on BBC Radio 2 in the United Kingdom. In 2011, Cole released a five-track album called Melodiem via Bandcamp. Her first full-length album, Lay It All Down, was released on 3 March 2014. She was a touring multi-instrumentalist for The Smashing Pumpkins from 2015 to 2024.

== Early life and influences ==
Cole was born in Melbourne, Australia. on October 25. Musically, she was influenced by her mother, a trained pianist who listened to rock artists such as Jimi Hendrix, Janis Joplin and the Rolling Stones, and her father, who preferred Maria Callas and was a classically trained pianist and soprano. Growing up, Cole often listened to concerts such as Woodstock and the Isle of Wight Festival. She recalled of her mother: "My Mum loved rock, especially guitar-driven music, so I got used to sitting through long concerts and 10 minute guitar solos". She was also influenced by The Beatles, The Eagles, Eurythmics, Aretha Franklin, Led Zeppelin and the Smashing Pumpkins.

Cole taught herself how to play guitar and piano, and began performing live at age 16. During the early stages of Cole's career, her mother was diagnosed with multiple sclerosis. Cole described the diagnosis, which made her "fearless" and influenced her debut EP, as "heartbreaking and a complete reality check". She has described her music as "Americana meets British pop", incorporating the styles and sounds of Colbie Caillat, Sheryl Crow, Fleetwood Mac and Tom Petty. Cole's music has also been compared to artists such as Stevie Nicks and KT Tunstall.

== Musical career ==
Cole's career began in Australia, where she wrote songs for Gloria Gaynor and other dance artists, toured, and released her debut EP. After publishing an autobiography on her website, which included a list of producers and songwriters she would most like to work with, she was contacted by Howard Willing. Following several trips to the United States to work on music projects, Cole decided to relocate to Los Angeles, where she currently resides. She also travels to Nashville frequently.

In 2009, Cole provided backing vocals on "I'll Be Home for Christmas", performed by Dean Martin featuring Scarlett Johansson on his album My Kind of Christmas. Her vocals also appear on Glen Campbell's albums Ghost on the Canvas (2011) and See You There (2013), and in music by Cheap Trick and New Church of Ease.

In 2010–2011, Cole released Lost Inside a Moment, an EP produced by Willing. Two singles from the recording, "Lost Inside a Moment" and "Sunrise", were playlisted by the United Kingdom's BBC Radio 2 in June and August–September 2011, respectively. A third song was also broadcast. In 2011, her single "Gravity" was used in an advertising campaign by Movado in the United States. The company also sponsored a profile of Cole for publication in The New York Times.

In 2011, Cole released a five-track album called Melodiem via Bandcamp. In March 2014, she released her first full-length album, Lay It All Down, featuring Kris Kristofferson ("Penelope") and the single "I Can't Wait". The album has been called a "collection of Americana, pop and Folk-infused tracks".

Cole has performed in London (September 2011) and throughout the United States, and appears regularly at Los Angeles venues. In Phoenix, she performed by Toby Keith's bar for whooznxt.com. She has shared the stage with Jackson Browne, Glen Campbell, Anna Nalick and Sam & Ruby. Cole has been sponsored by Cole Clark Guitars, Movado and Sennheiser. She enjoys interacting with her fans via social media.

She opened for and temporally filled in as a bass player for American alternative rock band The Smashing Pumpkins on their eight-date acoustic In Plainsong tour in June 2015 and has also appeared on bass on the 2016 tour of the same name. That same month, she opened for America at the 2nd Annual Benefit for New Horizons.

In 2018 she released Things That Break pt. 1, a five track E.P. with a distinct Americana sound to it her most personal record to date. The same year, Cole toured with The Smashing Pumpkins again on the Shiny and Oh So Bright Tour, this time on keyboards, guitar and providing backing vocals. She has been touring with the band ever since.

== Awards ==
Cole has been recognised by Musicoz, which recognises independent music in Australia, and received "ASCAP Plus" awards in 2010 and 2011. "Gravity" was used by Movado after she earned a 2010 Movado Future Legend trophy, which recognises "accomplishments in the art of music", especially for singing and songwriting. She was named "Best Country Artist" and "Artist of the Year" at the 2013 Artists in Music Awards, and received "grand prize" by OurStage and "gold status" by whooznxt.com. The Los Angeles Music Awards recognised Cole in the categories "Best Female Singer/Songwriter" and "Record of the Year" in 2013.

== Discography ==
- Lost Inside a Moment (2010–2011)
- Melodiem (2011)
- Lay It All Down (2014)
- Things That Break PT1 (2018)
