= Lazaretto (album) =

Studio album by Jack White
- Released: June 10, 2014
- Recorded: Mid 2012 – Early 2014
- Studio: Third Man (Nashville, Tennessee)
- Genre: Blues rock; garage rock revival; alternative rock; country rock
- Length: 39:13
- Label: Third Man; XL; Columbia
- Producer: Jack White

Jack White chronology
| Blunderbuss (2012) | Lazaretto (2014) | Acoustic Recordings 1998–2016 (2016) |

Singles from Lazaretto
- 1. "High Ball Stepper" Released: April 1, 2014 (promotional); 2. "Lazaretto" Released: April 19, 2014; 3. "Would You Fight for My Love?" Released: June 30, 2014; 4. "That Black Bat Licorice" Released: February 17, 2015

Lazaretto is the second studio album by Jack White. It was released on June 10, 2014, through White's own label Third Man Records in association with XL Recordings and Columbia Records. The "Ultra" LP features hidden songs, secret grooves and holograms that materialize when the record is being played. Lazaretto was partly inspired by a collection of short stories, poems, and plays White wrote when he was 19 years old and rediscovered years later in his attic. The album debuted at number one on the Billboard 200, selling 138,000 copies in its first week.

== Background ==
Sessions for the album began in 2012 during gaps in touring for White's Blunderbuss album. White told Rolling Stone in a February 2013 interview that he was working on "20 to 25 tracks." He explained of the new material, "it's definitely not one sound. It's definitely several. Like you heard in Blunderbuss, there're many styles there. I don't pick my style and then write a song. I just write whatever comes out of me, and whatever style it is what it is, and it becomes something later." He hinted during a January 2014 chat session with fans on the Third Man Records message board that he was almost done with the record. "I'm producing two albums this month, and finishing them," White wrote. "One of them is mine."

The Vault, Third Man's exclusive fan club subscription service, released a limited-edition version of the album on blue-and-white vinyl. It was packaged with a 40-page hardcover book, a fold-out poster, a National Archives photo that appears throughout the album art, and a 7-inch featuring demo versions of two songs recorded in Mexico, "Alone in My Home" and "Entitlement", the finished versions of which appear on the album. The "Ultra LP" version is mastered by Bob Ludwig without compression directly from the analog master tape, has some different mixes from the CD/digital version, has a flattened edge, and contains hidden tracks that are pressed into the vinyl underneath the inner label on each side of the record, which were cut to be played at 78 and 45 RPM, respectively, making this possibly the first three-speed record. Side one has a glossy finish, is cut to play from near the label to the outer edge, and ends in a lock groove. Side two has a matte finish, a song ("Just One Drink") that has two different intros depending on where the needle is dropped, another lock groove at the end of the side, and a hand-etched hologram of an angel (by Tristan Duke of Infinity Light Science) which appears in the dead wax at a certain angle to the light when it's being played. It also includes a download card for the songs on the album.

== Songs ==
Songs on the album were inspired, in part, by short stories and plays written by White when he was 19 years old. He found the writings in his attic and reworked them into new lyrics. ""Some of it's garbage, and I sort of laughed while I was reading it," he explained to Rolling Stone. "I was going to throw away a bunch of it, but I was just coming up with new styles of attacking songwriting for the album." In April, a video of the instrumental song "High Ball Stepper" was released as a teaser for the album. "Lazaretto", the title track, was confirmed as the album's first single. White explained the song's meaning to NPR: "This was a rhyme about the braggadocio of some hip-hop lyrics — the bragging about oneself in hip-hop music. The character who's singing this song is bragging about himself, but he's actually bragging about real things he's actually accomplished and real things that he actually does, not imaginary things or things he would like to do." The song "Just One Drink" premiered in May.

== Critical reception ==
Professional ratings
Aggregate scores
| Source | Rating |
|---|---|
| AnyDecentMusic? | 7.7/10 |
| Metacritic | 80/100 |
Review scores
| Source | Rating |
| AllMusic | 4/5 stars |
| The A.V. Club | A− |
| The Daily Telegraph | 5/5 stars |
| Entertainment Weekly | B |
| The Guardian | 4/5 stars |
| The Independent | 3/5 stars |
| NME | 7/10 |
| Pitchfork | 7.1/10 |
| Rolling Stone | 4/5 stars |
| Spin | 6/10 |

Lazaretto was widely acclaimed by contemporary music critics. At Metacritic, which assigns a normalized rating out of 100 to reviews from mainstream critics, the album received an average score of 80, based on 46 reviews, which indicates "generally favorable reviews". Pitchfork's Stephen M. Deusner remarked: "Lazaretto makes all of his other projects sound a bit scrawny by comparison. It’s the densest, fullest, craziest, and most indulgent that White has sounded". Phil Hebblethwaite of NME described it as "a varied album that lacks any monster riffs like the ones White used to write for The White Stripes, but includes enough intrigue, originality and plain weirdness to delight and, in some places, appal." Alexis Petridis of The Guardian wrote: "On the surface, Lazaretto seems to be the work of someone who's furiously angry at everything from "children today" [...] to God", but because the album "possesses both a sense of humour" and "a sense of perspective", that makes the album "a rather more complicated business than it first appears."

Randall Roberts of the Los Angeles Times described the album as "lyrically and musically challenging and filled with many fresh avenues of exploration, even as it nods to key tones and ideas from throughout the history of pre-rap American music." Jason Pettigrew of Alternative Press called it "more jubilant, unbridled and manic" than Blunderbuss, and that "Lazaretto finds him simultaneously unbridled as a player, yet meticulous as both mad scientist and personal diarist." At USA Today, Jerry Shriver found the release to be "highly-charged, wonderfully weird and typically eclectic treasure chest of tunes that rank with his best." David Fricke of Rolling Stone noted how White's craftsmanship on the album comes "with a decisive attention to contour, color scheme and cagey, durable detail." At The Oakland Press, Gary Graff illustrated how White "is, characteristically, more of a shape-shifter, engaging in gleeful sonic alchemy throughout its 11 tracks as he stirs together a dizzying array of influences, from garagey psychedelia to earthy Americana."

== Commercial performance ==
Lazaretto debuted at number one on the Billboard 200 chart, selling 138,000 copies in its first week. The vinyl LP sold 40,000 copies, which set the record for the most vinyl sales in one week for an album since Nielsen SoundScan began tracking sales in 1991; the album held the record for seven years before it was broken by Taylor Swift's Evermore in May 2021. Vinyl LP sales of Lazaretto during week one nearly matched the number of CDs sold, at 28.9 percent and 30 percent, respectively. Downloads were 41.1 percent of total first week sales. With 87,000 vinyl copies shifted throughout the year, it was not only the year's top-selling vinyl LP in the US, but also the top-selling vinyl LP for any calendar year since SoundScan started tracking sales. As of December 2014, Lazaretto has sold 325,000 copies in the United States.

In 2014, it was awarded a double gold certification from the Independent Music Companies Association, which indicated sales of at least 150,000 copies throughout Europe.

== Accolades ==
At the 57th Annual Grammy Awards, the album was nominated for Best Alternative Music Album. The track "Lazaretto" was nominated for Best Rock Song and won Best Rock Performance.

== Track listing ==
All tracks are written by Jack White.

CD and digital download version
| No. | Title | Length |
|---|---|---|
| 1. | "Three Women" | 3:57 |
| 2. | "Lazaretto" | 3:39 |
| 3. | "Temporary Ground" | 3:13 |
| 4. | "Would You Fight for My Love?" | 4:09 |
| 5. | "High Ball Stepper" | 3:52 |
| 6. | "Just One Drink" | 2:37 |
| 7. | "Alone in My Home" | 3:27 |
| 8. | "Entitlement" | 4:06 |
| 9. | "That Black Bat Licorice" | 3:50 |
| 10. | "I Think I Found the Culprit" | 3:49 |
| 11. | "Want and Able" | 2:34 |

Third Man Records Vault edition bonus 7"
| No. | Title | Length |
|---|---|---|
| 1. | "Alone in My Home" (demo version) |
| 2. | "Entitlement" (demo version) |

Notes

- The vinyl version of the album features two untitled tracks (each less a minute long) after "High Ball Stepper" and "Want and Able"
- "Three Women" is based on the song "Three Women Blues" by Blind Willie McTell.
- "Alone in my Home" has a slightly longer intro on vinyl.
- "Just One Drink" has two different intros, depending on where the needle is dropped, on vinyl. The electric intro is 2:37 and the acoustic intro is 2:40.

== Personnel ==
Personnel adapted from Lazaretto liner notes.

- Jack White – lead vocals (except track 5), electric guitar (tracks 2, 4, 5, 6, 9), acoustic guitar (tracks 3, 6, 7, 8, 10, and 11), piano (tracks 1 and 11), maracas (track 7), shaker (track 7), percussion (track 9)

Additional musicians

- Ruby Amanfu – shaker (track 10), tambourine (track 5), backing vocals (tracks 4, 5, 6, 9, 10)
- Carla Azar – drums (tracks 3, 4, 5, 6, 10), timpani (track 4)
- Maggie Björklund – acoustic guitar (track 6), pedal steel guitar (tracks 3, 5, 10)
- Ben Blackwell – drums (tracks 7, 8)
- Timbre – harp (tracks 7, 8, 9, 10)
- Bryn Davies – upright bass (tracks 4, 9)
- Dominic Davis – bass guitar (tracks 1, 2, 4, 7), bass VI (track 7), upright bass (track 9)
- Doc – electric guitar, B3 Organ, (tracks 1, 2, 3, 4)
- Olivia Jean – African drum (track 4), backing vocals (track 9)
- Daru Jones – drums (tracks 1, 2, 4)
- Fats Kaplin – fiddle (tracks 2, 4, 9), mandolin (tracks 7, 9), pedal steel guitar (tracks 1, 8)
- Patrick Keeler – drums (track 9)
- Ikey Owens – B3 Organ (tracks 1, 4), keyboards (track 1), Moog Synthesizer (track 2), piano (tracks 7, 8), Rhodes (track 4)
- Catherine Popper – bass guitar (tracks 3, 5, 6, 10)
- Lillie Mae Rische – fiddle (tracks 3, 5, 6, 10), mandolin (track 10), backing vocals (tracks 3, 7)
- Brooke Waggoner – B3 Organ (tracks 4, 9), clavinet (track 9), Moog Synthesizer (track 4), piano (tracks 3, 4, 5, 6, 10)
- Cory Younts – harmonica (track 1), Korg Synthesizer (track 2), mandolin (tracks 1, 8), piano (track 4), shaker (track 7), backing vocals (tracks 1, 7, 8)

Technical personnel

- Jack White – layout, design, mixing, production, composition
- Bob Ludwig – mastering
- Joshua V. Smith – assistant, engineering, mixing, backing vocals (track 6)
- Lars Fox – editing
- Mindy Watts – assistant
- Blind Willie McTell – composer
- F.C. Gundlach – back cover photo
- Lewis Hine – back cover, images
- Mary Ellen Matthews – photography
- Jo McCaughey – photography
- Ian Montone – management
- Ryon Nishimori – design, layout
- Vance Powell – engineering
- Nathanio Strimpopulos – design, layout
- Trent Thibodeaux – design, layout
- Elfred Tseng – images

== Charts ==
=== Weekly charts ===
| Chart (2014) | Peak position |
|---|---|
| Australian Albums (ARIA) | 3 |
| Belgian Albums (Ultratop Flanders) | 2 |
| Belgian Albums (Ultratop Wallonia) | 12 |
| Canadian Albums (Billboard) | 1 |
| Danish Albums (Hitlisten) | 1 |
| Dutch Albums (Album Top 100) | 5 |
| Finnish Albums (Suomen virallinen lista) | 13 |
| French Albums (SNEP) | 9 |
| German Albums (Offizielle Top 100) | 5 |
| Italian Albums (FIMI) | 28 |
| New Zealand Albums (RMNZ) | 2 |
| Portuguese Albums (AFP) | 5 |
| Polish Albums (ZPAV) | 8 |
| Scottish Albums (OCC) | 7 |
| Swedish Albums (Sverigetopplistan) | 21 |
| Swiss Albums (Schweizer Hitparade) | 2 |
| UK Albums (OCC) | 4 |
| US Billboard 200 | 1 |
| US Top Alternative Albums (Billboard) | 1 |
| US Top Rock Albums (Billboard) | 1 |
| US Indie Store Album Sales (Billboard) | 1 |

=== Year-end charts ===
| Chart (2014) | Position |
|---|---|
| Australian Albums (ARIA) | 68 |
| Belgian Albums (Ultratop Flanders) | 46 |
| Belgian Albums (Ultratop Wallonia) | 143 |
| Canadian Albums (Billboard) | 47 |
| US Billboard 200 | 55 |
| US Alternative Albums (Billboard) | 7 |
| US Top Rock Albums (Billboard) | 8 |

== Certifications ==
| Region | Certification | Certified units/sales |
|---|---|---|
| Canada (Music Canada) | Gold | 40,000^{^} |
| United Kingdom (BPI) | Silver | 79,918 |
^{^} Shipments figures based on certification alone.

== See also ==
- List of Billboard 200 number-one albums of 2014
