= Sam & Ruby =

American musical duo

- Origin: Nashville, Tennessee, United States
- Genres: Pop/Rock, Singer/Songwriter
- Years active: 2005–2010
- Labels: Ryko
- Members: Sam Brooker and Ruby Amanfu

Sam & Ruby were an American musical duo composed of Sam Brooker and Ruby Amanfu. Sam & Ruby were based in Nashville and recorded two EPs and one full-length record.

They were signed to the Rykodisc record label. Their song "Heaven's My Home" was featured on the movie and soundtrack The Secret Life of Bees. They were both members of the A Capella group The Collective featured on Season 3 of NBC's The Sing-Off.

== History ==
=== Early years ===
Brooker and Amanfu first met in 1999 in Nashville, where both were currently living at the time. Brooker was originally from Green Bay, Wisconsin and moved to Nashville after college to work as a genetic researcher, playing and writing music in his off time. Amanfu was born in Ghana, West Africa and moved with her family to Nashville when she was 3, where she grew up. The two met when Brooker was performing in an in the round, which led them to become friends. Brooker then moved to New York City to pursue music and Amanfu went on to releasing a solo album in the UK in 2003.

The two later reconnected in Nashville and began collaborating on music, writing the song "The Here and The Now" together. Performing together at shows, they eventually became a duo in 2005. and worked on the song "Heaven's My Home" which was featured in the 2008 film The Secret Life of Bees. In 2008 they released a six-song EP entitled Sam & Ruby that was recorded in Brooker's apartment, which would later catch the attention of record label Rykodisc.

=== The Here And The Now ===
Rykodisc signed Sam & Ruby and later released their debut album, The Here And The Now in August, 2009. The album would later be named "Album of the Year" by the Associated Press in their top ten albums of the year list.

Sam & Ruby would later go on to release a six-song EP entitled Press On in February, 2010.

== Discography ==
- Sam & Ruby [EP] (2008)
- The Here And The Now (2009)
- Press On - EP (2010)
