= Kye Kye =

American indietronica band

- Origin: Portland, Oregon, U.S.
- Genres: Electropop, indietronica
- Years active: 2010–present
- Label: Valga
- Members: Olga Yagolnikov Phelan; Timothy Yagolnikov
- Website: kyekyemusic.com

Kye Kye (stylized KYE KYE) is an American indietronica band from Portland, Oregon, that formed in 2010. The band is made up of Estonian-born Yagolnikov siblings Olga and Timothy. They achieved commercial and critical success with their second studio album entitled Fantasize that was released in early 2014 by Valga Records, which is an independent record label. Kye Kye's music has also been featured in several popular television series and movies.

== History ==
=== Formation and debut album (2010–2011) ===
The band started in 2010, its original members the three Yagolnikov siblings Olga on lead vocals and guitar, Alex on keyboards, and Timothy on programming, keyboards and guitar, and Olga's husband Thomas Phelan on the drums. The band are self-professed Christians, but they do not consider their music to be "Christian music".

In 2011, they released their first studio album entitled Young Love that was released independently by the band.

=== Fantasize (2014) ===
They released their second studio album entitled Fantasize on January 21, 2014. For the Billboard charting the week of February 8, 2014, the album charted at Nos. 7 and 50 on the Top Heatseekers Albums and Independent Albums charts. The album was met with positive reviews from CCM Magazine, Knoxville News Sentinel, and Indie Vision Music.

== Members ==
Current members

- Olga Yagolnikov Phelan – vocals, guitar
- Timothy Yagolnikov – programming, keyboards, guitar

Former members

- Thomas Phelan - drums
- Alex Yagolnikov - keyboards

== Discography ==
Studio albums

- Young Love (2011)
- Fantasize (2014)
- Arya (2021)
