= Lazaretto (song) =

Single by Jack White

from the album Lazaretto
- B-side: "Power of My Love"
- Released: April 19, 2014
- Recorded: 2012–2014 (studio version); April 19, 2014 (live version)
- Genre: Garage rock; alternative rock
- Length: 3:39
- Label: Third Man
- Songwriter: Jack White
- Producer: Jack White

Jack White singles chronology
"I'm Shakin" (2012)	"Lazaretto" (2014)	"Would You Fight for My Love?" (2014)

"Lazaretto" is the first single from Jack White's second solo album of the same name. The live version of the song was recorded, pressed and released on the same day (April 19, 2014). On the B-side was a cover of Elvis Presley's song "Power of My Love".

The studio version of the song was released on April 21 on YouTube, and on April 22 the single was available for purchase digitally and as an instant download with all iTunes Lazaretto album pre-orders.

== Background ==
According to White, the musical arrangement to "Lazaretto" was inspired by MC Lyte's 1989 hit single "Cha Cha Cha".

== Critical reception ==
In one positive review that emphasized White's guitar prowess, Billboard wrote that the single "is in-and-out, leaving the listener panting and ready to hear more from White's new album." Giving the single four stars, Chuck Arnold of People said that on the track, White "unleashes one of his funkiest grooves since 'Seven Nation Army'." Madison Vain, with Entertainment Weekly called the song a "dense, manic, and fantastically indulgent display of musicality," and said it "further cement[s] his position as rock & roll's primal keeper of the flame."

The song was nominated for two Grammy Awards—Best Rock Song and Best Rock Performance—winning the latter.

== Track listing ==
- 7" vinyl
1. "Lazaretto" – 3:57
2. "Power of My Love" – 5:00

== Charts ==
=== Weekly charts ===
Weekly chart performance for "Lazaretto"
Chart (2014)	Peak position
Belgium (Ultratip Bubbling Under Flanders)	18
Canada Hot 100 (Billboard)	98
Canada Rock (Billboard)	2
France (SNEP)	173
US Bubbling Under Hot 100 (Billboard)	8
US Hot Rock & Alternative Songs (Billboard)	15
US Rock & Alternative Airplay (Billboard)	9

=== Year-end charts ===
Year-end chart performance for "Lazaretto"
Chart (2014)	Position
US Hot Rock Songs (Billboard)	52
US Rock Airplay (Billboard)	35

== Personnel ==
- Jack White – vocals, electric guitar
- Daru Jones – drums
- Dominic Davis – bass
- Fats Kaplin – fiddle
- Isaiah "Ikey" Owens – Moog synth
- Cory Younts – Korg synth
