= Freedom at 21 =

Single by Jack White

from the album Blunderbuss
- B-side: "Inaccessible Mystery"
- Released: April 1, 2012
- Studio: Third Man Studio, Nashville, Tennessee
- Genre: Rap rock
- Length: 2:51
- Label: Third Man; Columbia; XL
- Songwriter: Jack White
- Producer: Jack White

Jack White singles chronology
"Sixteen Saltines" (2012)	"Freedom at 21" (2012)	"I'm Shakin'" (2012)

Music video
- "Freedom at 21" on YouTube

"Freedom at 21" is a song by American musician Jack White from his debut solo album Blunderbuss (2012). Third Man Records distributed the single on April 1, 2012 by releasing 1000 helium balloons attached to flexi-disc copies of the track. It was released for digital download and as a 7-inch vinyl single on June 9 and June 11, respectively, with the B-side "Inaccessible Mystery". A music video directed by Hype Williams and starring Brittany Colombo was uploaded to White's YouTube channel on July 16, 2012.

"Freedom at 21" peaked at 77 on Ultratop's Ultratip Bubbling Under charts in the Flanders region of Belgium, and it reached Billboard's Alternative Songs and Hot Rock Songs charts, peaking at 22 and 35, respectively. It was nominated for Best Rock Song at the 55th Annual Grammy Awards.

== Release ==
"Freedom at 21" was released as a single on April 1, 2012. To distribute the single, Third Man Records released 1000 helium balloons attached to flexi-disc copies of the song. In addition, the balloons were attached to postcards with directions on how to inform Third Man Records of the discovery. The single was later released via digital download on June 9 and as a 7-inch single on June 11 with the B-side "Inaccessible Mystery".

== Composition ==
"Freedom at 21" contains elements of hip hop music. Its "clattering drum pattern" was created by placing a tape echo on a drum beat played by Carla Azar.

== Reception ==
"Freedom at 21" was nominated for Best Rock Song at the 55th Annual Grammy Awards.

== Music video ==
The music video for "Freedom at 21" was directed by Hype Williams and stars Brittany Colombo as a police officer. It was filmed in June 2012 over a five-day period. Filming sessions for the desert scenes occurred in Lancaster, California and lasted between four and five hours per day. The remainder of the video was filmed at a studio in Burbank, California. During production, police officers taught Colombo various maneuvers, such as placing handcuffs on a person. A stunt double was used for shots in which the police officer rides a motorcycle.

The video was uploaded to White's YouTube channel on July 16, 2012. A "blue tint" is present in the video. In the video, White is stopped by a police officer while driving; he is then arrested and placed in jail. The video shows footage of White lip-synching to the song's lyrics in his cell interspersed with shots of a "scantily clad inmate". She "starts to grind on" White, during which footage of White playing an electric guitar is shown. White eventually escapes his cell, resulting in a car chase in which he is stopped by a barricade created by a group of police officers and their cars. Queens Of The Stone Age frontman Josh Homme makes a cameo as one of the officers.

As of September 2022, the music video for "Freedom at 21" has over 15 million views.

== Track listing ==
Digital download and 7-inch vinyl

1. "Freedom at 21"
2. "Inaccessible Mystery"

== Personnel ==
Adapted from "Freedom at 21" vinyl single liner notes.

"Freedom at 21"

- Jack White – lead vocals, electric guitar solo, writer (music and lyrics), producer, mixing
- Olivia Jean – electric guitar
- Bryn Davies – upright bass
- Carla Azar – drums
- Vance Powell – recording, mixing
- Joshua V. Smith – assistant in recording and mixing
- Mindy Watts – assistant in recording and mixing

"Inaccessible Mystery"

- Jack White – lead vocals, acoustic guitar, vibrachime, writer (music and lyrics), producer
- Johnny Walker – electric guitar
- Jake Orral – amplified acoustic guitar
- Jack Lawrence – bass
- Daru Jones – drums
- Vance Powell – recording, mixing
- Joshua V. Smith – recording, assistant in mixing

== Charts ==
Chart (2012)	Peak position
Belgium (Ultratip Flanders)	27
Canada Rock (Billboard)	21
US Alternative Airplay (Billboard)	22
US Hot Rock & Alternative Songs (Billboard)	35
