= Would You Fight for My Love? =

Single by Jack White

from the album Lazaretto
- B-side: "Parallel"
- Released: June 30, 2014
- Studio: Third Man (Nashville, Tennessee)
- Genre: Blues rock; alternative rock
- Length: 4:09
- Label: Third Man; XL
- Songwriter: Jack White
- Producer: Jack White

Jack White singles chronology
"Lazaretto" (2014)	"Would You Fight for My Love?" (2014)	"That Black Bat Licorice" (2015)

"Would You Fight for My Love?" is a song by American musician Jack White. It was first released as a promo CD single in Europe on June 30, 2014, and later released to alternative radio stations on August 26 and as a 7-inch single on November 5. The official music video for the song was released on September 12, 2014. "Would You Fight for My Love?" peaked at number 38 on the Billboard Alternative Songs chart.

== Music video ==
The official music video for "Would You Fight for My Love?", lasting four minutes and 20 seconds, premiered on YouTube and Vevo on September 12, 2014. It was directed by Robert Hales and produced by White and Nina Dluhy-Miller.

== Track listing ==
=== 7" vinyl ===
- Third Man — TMR–291

Side A
No.	Title	Length
1.	"Would You Fight for My Love?"	4:09

Side B
No.	Title	Length
1.	"Parallel"	4:26

=== CD ===
Promo CD
No.	Title	Length
1.	"Would You Fight for My Love?"	4:09

== Charts ==
Chart (2014)	Peak position
Canada Rock (Billboard)	35
US Alternative Airplay (Billboard)	38

== Release history ==
Region	Date	Label	Format
Europe	June 30, 2014	Third Man; XL	CD
United States	August 26, 2014	Third Man	Radio airplay
United States	November 5, 2014	Third Man	7"
