= Blunderbuss (album) =

Studio album by Jack White
- Released: April 23, 2012
- Studios: Third Man, Nashville, Tennessee
- Genre: Blues rock
- Length: 41:52
- Labels: Third Man; XL; Columbia
- Producer: Jack White

Jack White chronology
Blunderbuss (2012)	Lazaretto (2014)

Singles from Blunderbuss
- 1. "Love Interruption" Released: January 31, 2012; 2. "Sixteen Saltines" Released: March 13, 2012; 3. "Freedom at 21" Released: April 1, 2012; 4. "I'm Shakin'" Released: October 10, 2012

Blunderbuss is the debut solo studio album by American musician Jack White. It was released in digital and physical formats beginning April 23, 2012, through Third Man Records, in association with XL Recordings and Columbia Records. Written almost entirely by White, the album was recorded and produced by him at Third Man Studio in Nashville, Tennessee. Various musical styles appear throughout, including blues rock, folk, and country soul.

The album received positive reviews from music critics, who praised White's ambitious songwriting and often compared the record favorably to his work for the White Stripes. It debuted at number one in five countries and reached the top 10 in ten other countries. It was certified platinum in Canada and gold by record industry trade groups internationally. The album was nominated for Album of the Year and Best Rock Album at the 55th Annual Grammy Awards, while the single "Freedom at 21" was nominated for Best Rock Song. In addition, the single "I'm Shakin'" received a nomination for Best Rock Performance at the 56th Annual Grammy Awards.

The lead single from Blunderbuss, "Love Interruption", was released on January 30, 2012, via White's website. The single "Sixteen Saltines" was uploaded to White's YouTube channel on March 13, and seven days later, the song was released as the second single via 7-inch vinyl with a cover of U2's "Love Is Blindness" as its B-side. On April 1, Third Man Records released the album's third single, "Freedom at 21", by attaching flexi disc copies of the song to 1000 helium balloons. A music video for the fourth and final single, a cover of Little Willie John's "I'm Shakin'", was released on October 10, and twenty days later, the single was released digitally and via 7-inch vinyl with the B-side "Blues on Two Trees".

== Background and recording ==
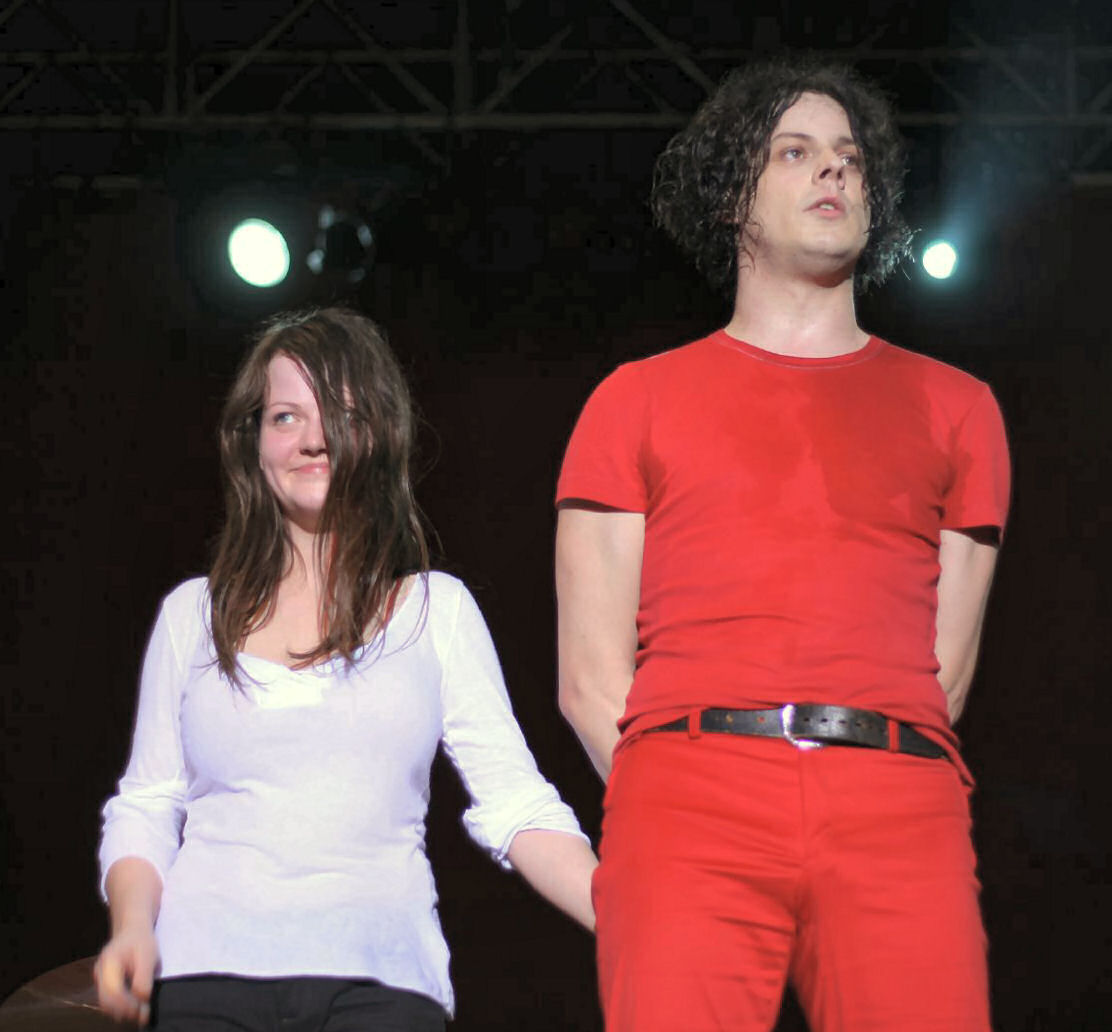
Jack was a member of the duo the White Stripes (pictured with bandmate Meg White) before the production of Blunderbuss.

Prior to the creation of Blunderbuss, Jack had been a member of the duo the White Stripes along with drummer Meg White. In 2007, the band went on a tour after releasing their sixth studio album Icky Thump. In the midst of the tour, the band canceled its United States tour dates, citing Meg's struggle with acute anxiety; shortly afterwards, the White Stripes canceled the remainder of the 2007 tour dates. The duo then went on a hiatus that ended in their breakup in 2011. Jack White worked on various other projects during this period. In 2008, the Raconteurs, of which White was a member, released their second studio album, Consolers of the Lonely. Rock supergroup the Dead Weather, another band that included White, released their debut studio album Horehound in 2009 and its successor Sea of Cowards in 2010. In addition, White produced Wanda Jackson's thirtieth studio album The Party Ain't Over (2011). In June 2011, White and his wife Karen Elson, who provided backing vocals for Blunderbuss, announced their intention to divorce and subsequently held a divorce party.

Produced at Third Man Studio in Nashville, Tennessee, Blunderbuss has its roots in White's recordings with several artists under his record label Third Man Records, including Tom Jones and Wanda Jackson. During these recordings, White learned to direct groups with as many as 12 people, more than he had directed under any of his previous musical projects. He started recording his own songs as a result of Wu-Tang Clan member RZA's last-minute cancellation of his attendance of a recording session with White. Reluctant to send away the musicians who had shown up for the session, White decided to use them to record some of his songs. He did not initially intend to create an album, though he found that after recording "six or seven songs it started to click that it was all becoming something".

I've put off making records under my own name for a long time but these songs feel like they could only be presented under my name. These songs were written from scratch, had nothing to do with anyone or anything else but my own expression, my own colors on my own canvas.

— Jack White, in regards to issuing Blunderbuss

White noted that directing hired musicians rather than working with a band afforded him several advantages; in the latter case he could not "tell other people what to play", whereas in the former case he "could ask people to play something" and then "go somewhere else and work on another part", thus enabling him to write "on the spot ... and for other musicians". Furthermore, the "freedom of having [his] own studio and having people in Nashville who could come at short notice" enabled White to use "100 different production styles" on Blunderbuss. While recording songs for the album, White alternated between all-male and all-female backing bands. He often recorded different versions of individual songs using each band to "see if anything changed". According to White, the sessions for Blunderbuss generated "something like 25 songs", 13 of which were included in the album. Most of the songs on it were written and recorded in the latter half of 2011.

White decided to release Blunderbuss through Columbia Records due to its history as "the first record label" and the label's capacity to expand the album's reach. According to White, friends of his asked him why he did not release it solely through his label, Third Man Records. He believed that doing so might "do [Blunderbuss] a disservice" and stated that he had "nothing to prove about being indie or anything like that". The album was engineered and mixed by Grammy Award-winning sound engineer Vance Powell, who had also worked with such names as the Whigs and Kings of Leon. While Bob Ludwig was working on mastering, he suggested to Powell that they avoid compression and increase the gain, an idea to which White responded enthusiastically. White was pleased with the results, finding that Blunderbuss "did not get changed by compression, it was just louder". Most songs on the album were recorded to 8-track analog tape; no more than 14 tracks were used per song. White preferred analog to digital recordings, finding fault in the latter's variety of "options to change the sounds that you are putting down" since it "[took] all the inherent soulful qualities of what is going on". The use of 8-track tape limited the number of tracks White could add to a song, leading him to "focus on better things".

== Composition ==
=== Music ===
Blunderbuss is a blues rock album that incorporates a variety of musical elements, including resemblances to progressive folk on "Missing Pieces" and "Take Me with You When You Go", hip hop influences on "Freedom at 21", R&B on White's cover of Little Willie John's "I'm Shakin'", and country rock on the song "I Guess I Should Go to Sleep". The final track, "Take Me with You When You Go", begins with "cool jazz breeziness" written in a 3/4 time signature, then transitions to a "frantic rock" sound. The country soul title track "Blunderbuss" and "Hypocritical Kiss" have been compared by critics to the works of Bob Dylan, and The Daily Telegraph's Neil McCormick compared "Weep Themselves to Sleep" to music on David Bowie's Aladdin Sane (1973). Pitchfork's Ryan Dombal found the Blunderbuss's "early rock, folk, and country styles" to resemble the Beatles' self-titled album (1968).

Rob Sheffield of Rolling Stone noted the presence of "made-in-Nashville flourishes" throughout the album, namely the fiddle, the mandolin, and the pedal steel guitar. "Missing Pieces" features a six-note riff played on a Rhodes piano, and "Sixteen Saltines" consists of "crunchy chords". "Freedom at 21" uses a "clattering drum pattern" that was achieved by placing a tape echo on a beat that drummer Carla Azar had played. The acoustic guitar and the Wurlitzer electric piano are prominent on the song "Love Interruption", which features vocals from Ruby Amanfu alongside the bass clarinet, played by Emily Bowland. Steve Kandell of Spin described the song as consisting of "mid-tempo soul", and Greg Kot of the Chicago Tribune noted the song's "moody atmosphere". "Weep Themselves to Sleep" includes an "itchy and needling" guitar solo–consisting of two guitars playing in different channels—that has the effect of transitioning out of an atmosphere of "orchestrated stateliness". Billboard described "Hip (Eponymous) Poor Boy" as having a "complex, hopscotching melody and rhythm". The melody and lyrics for the song were conceived in a dream; upon awaking, White "forced [him]self" to record what he had dreamt. "I Guess I Should Go to Sleep" is written in a "jazzy tempo", and it contains a violin solo. "On and On and On" presents a variety of moods and musical elements throughout. White occasionally sings in falsetto on Blunderbuss.

Critics noted similarities and differences between Blunderbuss and music White had written for other musical projects, including the White Stripes, the Dead Weather, and the Raconteurs. The Toronto Star's Ben Rayner stated that White "doesn't feel much like playing the showboating White Stripes guitar god", though he mentioned "flashes of Stripe-esque fury" on "Sixteen Saltines". Other critics compared "Sixteen Saltines" to the White Stripes' "Blue Orchid" (2005). Michael Roffman of Consequence of Sound noted that "Love Interruption" was not as well-received as "Sixteen Saltines", "probably because with the Wurlitzer and the clarinet, ['Love Interruption'] didn't necessarily relive those feelings of seeing the [White Stripes]". Billboard viewed "I'm Shakin'" and "Trash Tongue Talker" as resembling music on The Party Ain't Over, which White produced. Dombal described Blunderbuss as being "closer to earth than [White's] fantastic White Stripes yet further away than the sometimes-pedestrian Raconteurs or Dead Weather". Mark Edwards of The Sunday Times remarked that "if [White's] lyrics seem oppressively focused on one subject, his music heads happily all over the place, echoing all the previous aspects of his career and wandering into new areas."

=== Lyrics and themes ===
The record deals far more with death; death and the romance of death. That's why I have a vulture on my shoulder on the cover. I’m making friends with the vulture. He’s not waiting for me to die to pick at me, we’re friends, and we’re in this together.

— White, regarding the vulture's relationship to the theme of death

In an interview for The New York Times, White said that Blunderbuss's central theme is death, a topic he felt "was overwhelming throughout the lyric writing". The vulture resting on White's shoulder on the album cover is a representation of this theme. The album's lyrics explore loss, "collapsing relationships", and "breakup emotions of hurt and love", often depicting "weak-willed" men and focusing on "dishonesty, jealousy, [and] immorality". Its songs sometimes depict White "swearing himself off women". Jerry Shiver of USA Today called Blunderbuss "Jack White's divorce album", and Alexis Petridis of The Guardian said that the album occasionally characterizes relationships with "lyrics that are completely hysterical in every sense of the phrase". The opening track, "Missing Pieces", depicts the loss of body parts to characterize what NME's Barry Nicolson described as "the give-and-take of relationships": "When they tell you they just can't live without you/ They ain't lying, they'll take pieces of you/ And they'll stand above you/ And walk away". The narrator of the song "Love Interruption" expresses desires to be subjected to various violent actions by "love". Dombal viewed the song not as "some masochistic fantasy" but as "a form of self discipline", citing the line "I won't let love disrupt, corrupt, or interrupt me anymore". According to White, the narrator in the closing track "Take Me with You When You Go" initially "sound[s] misogynistic", but "is on his knees begging to be taken with the girl at the end".

"Sixteen Saltines" depicts an "emasculated, exasperated" narrator who struggles with the conspicuousness of a former lover. Its lyrics feature hooks and imagery describing high school tropes and abandonment at sea. The titular track "Blunderbuss" uses internal rhymes and "images of decadence" as it describes an adulterous episode between the narrator and a married woman. Steven Hyden of The A.V. Club described "Hypocritical Kiss" as a "duality of recrimination and self-flagellation", and he interpreted the song as depicting an argument between Jack White and his former bandmate Meg White in the midst of the White Stripes' breakup. In the middle of the song, its lyrics shift from the point of view of one speaker in the conversation to the other. When asked if the song "Hip (Eponymous) Poor Boy" referenced the White Stripes' breakup, White responded that the song is about "white hipster musicianship and authenticity", and that its use of the word "stripes" represents "the [American] flag and the American dream of profiting at any cost".

== Promotion and release ==
On January 30, 2012, White announced the album Blunderbuss with release dates of April 23 and April 24, 2012. The same day, a free stream of "Love Interruption" was posted to White's website; the song was made available for purchase on January 31 at 12:00 a.m. Eastern Standard Time. On February 7, a 7-inch vinyl version of the song was released along with the B-side "Machine Gun Silhouette". The single peaked at number 13 and 27 on the Billboard US Alternative Songs and US Rock Songs charts, respectively.

White performed "Love Interruption" and "Sixteen Saltines" on the March 3, 2012 episode of Saturday Night Live with two different backing bands, one all-female and the other all-male. Five days later, White performed at a celebration of Third Man Records' third anniversary at its headquarters in Nashville. The performance included six songs from Blunderbuss.

The studio version of "Sixteen Saltines" was released online via White's YouTube channel on March 13, 2012. The 7-inch vinyl single, which included a cover of U2's "Love Is Blindness" (1991) as its B-side, was released March 20. In observance of Record Store Day, Third Man Records released a 12-inch vinyl edition of the single that contained a playable etching of the record label's logo on the B-side. In addition, a limited edition 12inch vinyl containing blue liquid was released. The single peaked at number 129 on the UK Singles Chart and number 12 on the Billboard US Alternative Songs chart. A playback of a vinyl copy of Blunderbuss was held at London, England at County Hall on March 20, 2012. White attended the event, during which he was interviewed by the audience and the Mayor of Lambeth, Councillor Christiana Valcarcel.

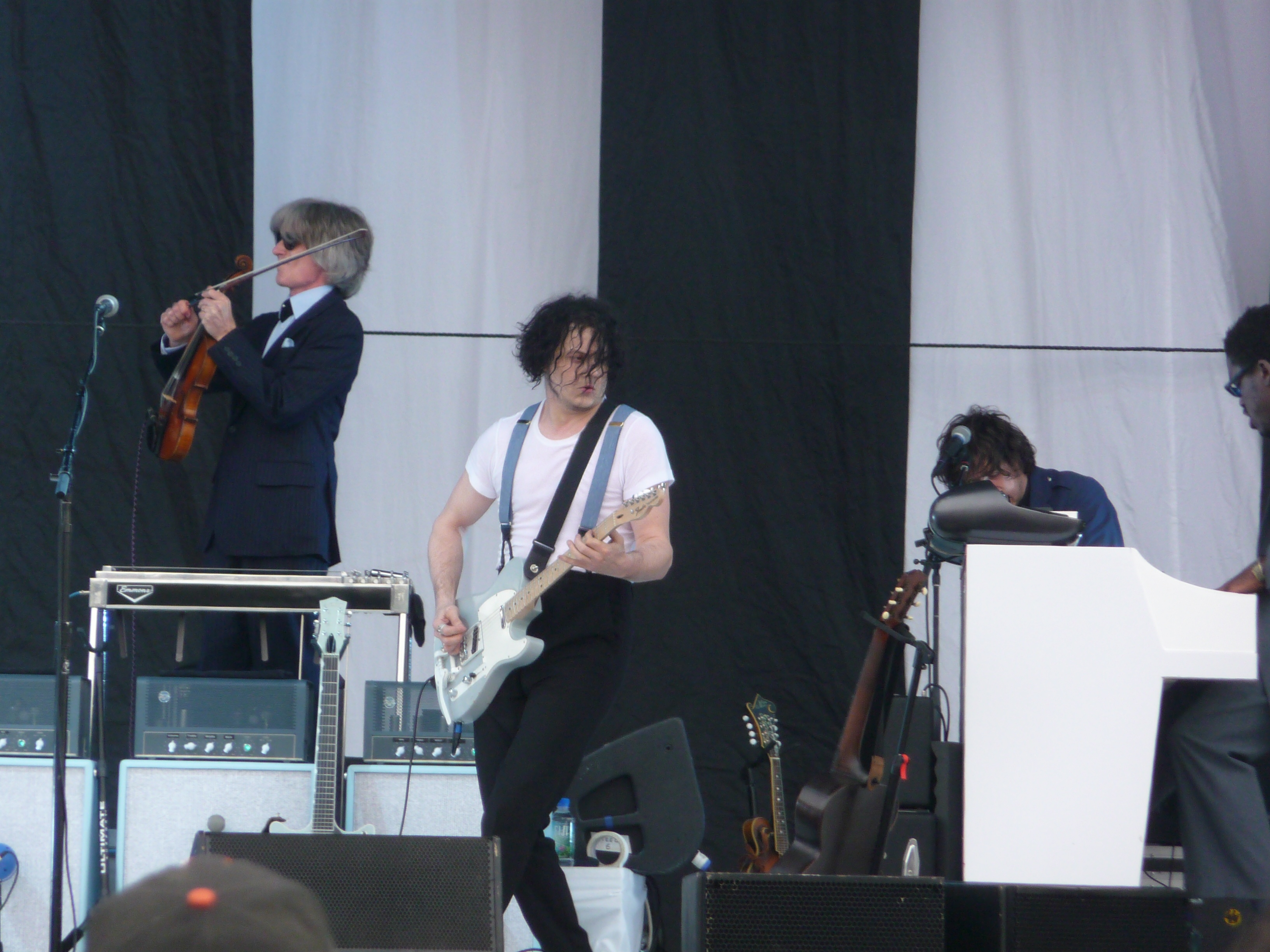
White and his band performing at the 2012 Outside Lands Music and Arts Festival.

On April 1, 2012, Third Man Records released 1000 helium balloons attached to flexi disc copies of "Freedom at 21". Third Man Records described the stunt as "an experiment exploring non-traditional forms of record distribution and a way to get records in the hands of people who don't visit record shops". A music video for the album's final single, "I'm Shakin'", was released on October 10, 2012. The song was made available for pre-order on October 16, and it was released digitally and on 7-inch vinyl on October 30. The single included the B-side "Blues on Two Trees".

On April 16, 2012, Third Man Records streamed Blunderbuss in its entirety on iTunes for free listening prior to release. The album was released via digital download and 7-inch vinyl by Third Man Records, Columbia Records, and XL Recordings. The vinyl LP version of Blunderbuss was pressed at United Record Pressing in Nashville. The Japanese edition of the album features "Machine Gun Silhouette" and "Love Is Blindness" as bonus tracks. The latter appears on the U2 tribute record AHK-toong BAY-bi Covered (2011).

=== Tour ===
On February 3, 2012, White announced performances at Sasquatch! Music Festival and BBC Radio 1's Hackney Weekend via his website. On February 14, he announced additional performance dates as part of a solo tour consisting of concerts in Tennessee, Alabama, and Oklahoma. The tour began on March 10 with a concert at Track 29 in Chattanooga, Tennessee. On March 19, White announced additional concerts in North America and Europe. The tour also included performances in Australia and concluded at the Fuji Rock Festival in Japan. During the tour, White alternated between two backing bands, one all-female and one all-male. The tour included supporting acts Alabama Shakes, First Aid Kit, and Pokey LaFarge.

White's April 27 concert at Webster Hall in New York City was streamed online as part of American Express Unstaged. Directed by Gary Oldman, the livestream gave viewers the choice to view the concert from a black-and-white shot, a balcony angle, or the director's cut. Viewers could also submit pictures of themselves as a contribution to a digital mosaic. The Grand Ole Opry gave White a framed blunderbuss as a gift after he sold out concerts at the Ryman Auditorium two nights in a row.

== Critical reception ==
Professional ratings
Aggregate scores
Source	Rating
AnyDecentMusic?	8.0/10
Metacritic	83/100
Review scores
Source	Rating
AllMusic	4/5 stars
The A.V. Club	B+
Chicago Tribune	3.5/4 stars
The Daily Telegraph	5/5 stars
The Guardian	5/5 stars
MSN Music (Expert Witness)	A−
NME	8/10
Pitchfork	7.8/10
Rolling Stone	4.5/5 stars
Spin	8/10

Blunderbuss was met with widespread acclaim from music critics. At Metacritic, which assigns a normalised rating out of 100 to reviews from mainstream critics, the album has an average score of 83 out of 100, based on 44 reviews.

Allison Stewarrt of The Washington Post called the album "restless, cranky and great, although weirdly inconsequential: less a statement of artistic purpose than a stellar collection of songs". Kot described Blunderbuss as "an entertaining rollercoaster of a listen", and he remarked that the album contains "pulse-pounding story-telling". McCormick stated that the album "crackles with life and energy", and he commented that White combines the influences of his previous musical projects "with a spirit of loose invention and the command of a veteran band leader". Hyden wrote that the album contains "at least five songs ... that match the excellence of The White Stripes' best". In a review that called Blunderbuss "a purposeful success", Dombal said the album has "some of White's best pure songwriting yet, but no earth-cracking riffs".

Kandell remarked that a solo album freed White from restraints present on his other musical projects; he stated, "Blunderbuss is a surprisingly measured and grounded response, given the possibilities", and he called the album "a mid-career stride". AllMusic's Stephen Thomas Erlewine described the album as more "emotionally direct" and "musically evasive" than White's previous work. He commented that this "dichotomy makes Blunderbuss a record that only seems richer with increased exposure". Billboard's Jem Aswad praised the album's "diversity and musical ambition", and he described it as "familiar enough to please the faithful, adventurous enough to forge a new path forward and satisfying enough to make fans realize anew just how much White has been missed". Shriver said that the album "aims wide and often hits home". Sheffield called its songs "brilliant" and described the album as White's "most expansive and masterful record since the White Stripes' 2003 classic, Elephant".

Several critics viewed the album as an unimpressive addition to White's musical catalog. Ben Ratliff of The New York Times noted several "great moments" in Blunderbuss, but he found most of the songs on the album to be underwhelming compared to the work of the White Stripes, commenting that the "riffs, chord progressions, and dynamic shifts" on Blunderbuss are "less distinguished" than the forceful lyrics. Rayner called the album "the most conventional record White has made outside of the Raconteurs" and concluded that it "maybe falls just a hair shy of the lofty expectations one might hold for a Jack White solo album".

=== Debate surrounding White's views toward women ===
Blunderbuss drew mixed commentary on what it revealed about White's views toward women. Writing for The Atlantic, Jessica Misener argued that Blunderbuss "crystallizes White's longstanding issues with women". She commented that much of White's music depicts him responding with "[v]itriol" to women "threatening his control" and that the lyrics of "Hypocritical Kiss" include "an instance of blatant manipulation". Regarding "Freedom at 21", Misener remarked: "White's dismissal of a 21st-century woman in Blunderbuss' 'Freedom at 21' makes perfect sense. A modern-day woman, with her sexual freedom and iPhone, represents power and choice, things that White embraces in his own life. But she's come by this in a way that's not on his terms, so she's a villain."

The Guardian's Laura Barton disagreed with Misener's article, viewing White's lyrical focus on women as the result of "proximity rather than gender" while asserting that his musical catalog contains "plenty examples of tenderness to counterbalance any venom". She argued that while "[i]t's undeniable that White's music is fired by the difference between male and female", his lyrics do not "assert that the masculine is superior to the feminine, rather that there are differences to be celebrated." In an article for Slate, Lauren O'Neal also expressed disagreement with Misener's article. Citing White's treatment toward women in his personal life, she remarked that "White seems to be more enlightened than the average man". Both O'Neal and Barton cited examples of White's collaborating with women, for which Barton called him "a great champion of women in rock'n'roll".

In an interview for The Guardian, Petridis asked White about "Freedom at 21", which Petridis described as appearing to be a "protracted moan about feminism, that seems to be suggesting that White's life would have been easier if women just did what he told them to". In response, White asserted that the song is about modern attitudes toward technology: "The early telephones, the telegraph, you had to treat this technology with respect. You can write on the internet for the whole world, you can make comments, but there's no one telling you that's impolite or that's inappropriate." In another interview for The Guardian with Tim Lewis, White responded to accusations of misogyny: "I don't know where the hell people got that from me because I've done so much work in my life to promote female musicians and artists ... I respect and I'm inspired by them so much."

=== Accolades ===
In 2012, "Sixteen Saltines" was nominated for Best Rock Video at the MTV Video Music Awards and Best Indie/Rock Video – International at the UK Music Video Awards. Blunderbuss was nominated for Album of the Year and Best Rock Album at the 55th Annual Grammy Awards in 2013, while "Freedom at 21" received a nomination for the Grammy Award for Best Rock Song. "I'm Shakin'" was nominated for the awards of Best Rock Performance and Best Music Video at the 56th Annual Grammy Awards.

Rolling Stone ranked Blunderbuss number three on its list of the best albums of 2012, saying that "every hypocritical kiss on the record hits like a hammer". The album was later included in the 2014 edition of the book 1001 Albums You Must Hear Before You Die.

== Commercial performance ==
Blunderbuss performed well commercially. It was the first album generated by any of White's musical projects to debut at number one on the US Billboard 200, with first week sales totaling 138,000. The album also debuted at number one in Canada, the United Kingdom, Switzerland, and the Flanders region of Belgium. Blunderbuss sold 33,000 vinyl copies in its first year, becoming the best-selling vinyl album of 2012.

On March 5, 2013, Blunderbuss was certified gold by the Recording Industry Association of America (RIAA), indicating sales of 500,000 units in the US. The album was also certified gold by the Australian Recording Industry Association (ARIA) and the British Phonographic Industry (BPI), indicating shipments of at least 35,000 and sales of at least 100,000 in Australia and the UK, respectively. Music Canada awarded Blunderbuss a platinum certification for selling at least 80,000 units in Canada.

== Track listing ==
All lyrics are written by Jack White, except where noted; all music is composed by Jack White, except where noted.

Standard edition
No.	Title	Lyrics	Music	Length
1.	"Missing Pieces"			3:27
2.	"Sixteen Saltines"			2:37
3.	"Freedom at 21"			2:51
4.	"Love Interruption"			2:38
5.	"Blunderbuss"			3:06
6.	"Hypocritical Kiss"			2:50
7.	"Weep Themselves to Sleep"			4:19
8.	"I'm Shakin'"	Rudy Toombs	Rudy Toombs	3:00
9.	"Trash Tongue Talker"			3:20
10.	"Hip (Eponymous) Poor Boy"			3:03
11.	"I Guess I Should Go to Sleep"			2:37
12.	"On and On and On"			3:55
13.	"Take Me with You When You Go"			4:10
Total length:				41:52

Japanese bonus tracks
No.	Title	Lyrics	Music	Length
14.	"Machine Gun Silhouette"			2:56
15.	"Love Is Blindness" (U2 cover)	Bono	Adam Clayton; Larry Mullen Jr.; The Edge	3:18
Total length:				48:06

== Personnel ==
Credits adapted from the Blunderbuss liner notes.

- Jack White – lead vocals (all tracks); electric guitar (tracks 1–3, 7, 8, 13); acoustic guitar (tracks 4, 5, 10, 12); piano (tracks 9, 11–13); rhodes (track 1); bass guitar (track 6); clapping (track 8); drums, guitar case (track 11)
- Carla Azar – drums (tracks 1–3, 6–8, 10, 13); maracas (track 6); percussion (track 2); shaker (tracks 1, 8); clapping (track 8)
- Bryn Davies – upright bass (tracks 1–3, 5, 7, 8, 10, 12, 13); clapping (track 8)
- Olivia Jean – clapping (track 8); drums (track 5); acoustic guitar (tracks 1, 6, 7, 12); electric guitar (tracks 3, 8, 13)
- Brooke Waggoner – Fender Rhodes (track 13); Hammond B3 (track 2); piano (tracks 5, 6, 7, 10, 12); wurlitzer piano (track 4)
- Ruby Amanfu – backing vocals (tracks 1, 4, 5, 8, 12, 13)
- Fats Kaplin – fiddle (tracks 2, 13); mandolin (track 10); pedal steel (tracks 5, 12)
- Karen Elson – backing vocals (tracks 8, 12, 13)
- Laura Matula – backing vocals (tracks 8, 12, 13)
- Emily Bowland – clarinet, bass clarinet (track 4)
- Daru Jones – drums, tambourine (track 9)
- Pokey LaFarge – mandolin, backing vocals (track 11)
- Joey Glynn – upright bass (track 11)
- Adam Hoskins – acoustic guitar (track 11)
- Ryan Koenig – backing vocals (track 11)
- Patrick Keeler – drums (track 12)
- Jack Lawrence – bass guitar (track 9)
- Jake Orrall – electric guitar (track 9)
- Lillie Mae Rische – fiddle (track 13)

== Charts ==
=== Weekly charts ===
Weekly sales chart performance for Blunderbuss
Chart (2012)	Peak position
Australian Albums (ARIA)	2
Austrian Albums (Ö3 Austria)	2
Belgian Albums (Ultratop Flanders)	1
Belgian Albums (Ultratop Wallonia)	12
Canadian Albums (Billboard)	1
Danish Albums (Hitlisten)	3
Dutch Albums (MegaCharts)	4
Finnish Albums (Suomen virallinen lista)	13
French Albums (SNEP)	5
Greek Albums (IFPI)	26
German Albums (Offizielle Top 100)	3
Irish Albums (IRMA)	2
Italian Albums (FIMI)	11
Japanese Albums (Oricon)	13
New Zealand Albums (RMNZ)	2
Norwegian Albums (VG-lista)	2
Polish Albums (ZPAV)	7
Portuguese Albums (AFP)	8
Spanish Albums (PROMUSICAE)	25
Swedish Albums (Sverigetopplistan)	20
Swiss Albums (Swiss Hitparade)	1
UK Albums (OCC)	1
US Billboard 200	1
US Top Rock Albums (Billboard)	1

=== Year-end charts ===
Year-end sales chart performance for Blunderbuss
Chart (2012)	Position
Australian Albums (ARIA)	47
Belgian Albums (Ultratop Flanders)	22
Canadian Albums (Billboard)	43
Dutch Albums (Album Top 100)	85
French Albums (SNEP)	125
Swiss Albums (Swiss Hitparade)	72
UK Albums (OCC)	86
US Billboard 200	66
US Top Rock Albums (Billboard)	20

== Certifications ==
Sales certifications for Blunderbuss
Region	Certification	Certified units/sales
Australia (ARIA)	Gold	35,000^{^}
Canada (Music Canada)	Platinum	80,000^{^}
United Kingdom (BPI)	Gold	143,112
United States (RIAA)	Gold	500,000^{^}
^{^} Shipments figures based on certification alone.

== See also ==
- List of number-one albums of 2012 (U.S.)
