= Fantasize (album) =

Studio album by Kye Kye
- Released: January 21, 2014
- Recorded: 2013 in Nashville, Tennessee
- Genre: Indietronica
- Length: 44:09
- Label: Valga
- Producer: Chad Howat

Kye Kye chronology
Young Love (2011)	Fantasize (2014)	Arya (2021)

Singles from Fantasize
- 1. "Honest Affection"; 2. "Dreams (2am)" 3. "People"; 4. "Softly"

Fantasize is the second studio album by American indietronica band Kye Kye, which was released on January 21, 2014, by Valga Records, and it was produced by Chad Howat. This album was funded through a Kickstarter campaign. The album attracted commercial successes and positive critical attention.

== Background ==
The album Fantasize is the second studio album by the American indietronica group Kye Kye, which it released on January 21, 2014 by Valga Records, and it was produced by Chad Howat in Nashville, Tennessee. This album was paid for by a Kickstarter funding campaign.

== Critical reception ==
Professional ratings
Review scores
Source	Rating
CCM Magazine	4/5 stars
Indie Vision Music	5/5 stars
Knoxville News Sentinel	4/5 stars

Fantasize received generally positive reception from music critics. Matt Conner of CCM Magazine rated the album four stars out of five, remarking how it is a "stellar follow-up" to Young Love that is "a well-produced set." At Knoxville News Sentinel, Chuck Campbell rated the album four out of five stars, stating that the release "is impressively cinematic and capable of quickly whisking listeners away into a nebulous world of gossamer electronic strains and untethered vocals." Ian Zandi of Indie Vision Music rated the album a perfect five stars, writing that "the perfect word to describe this album. Heavenly."

== Commercial performance ==
For the Billboard charting week of February 8, 2014, the album charted at Nos. 7 and 50 on the Top Heatseekers Albums and Independent Albums charts.

== Track listing ==
Tracklist
No.	Title	Length
1.	"I Already See It"	4:27
2.	"Honest Affection"	3:23
3.	"People"	3:24
4.	"Glass"	4:09
5.	"Scared or Selfish"	4:03
6.	"Dreams (2am)"	3:24
7.	"Fantasize"	1:51
8.	"Seasons"	2:57
9.	"Softly"	4:50
10.	"Her"	4:05
11.	"Hiding Place"	3:52
12.	"Celeste"	3:44
Total length:		44:09

== Chart performance ==
Chart (2014)	Peak position
US Heatseekers Albums (Billboard)	7
US Independent Albums (Billboard)	50
