= Taking Me Back =

2021 single by Jack White

Single by Jack White

from the album Fear of the Dawn
- B-side: "Taking Me Back (Gently)"
- Released: October 18, 2021
- Recorded: 2021
- Studio: Third Man (Nashville)
- Genre: Hard rock; garage rock
- Length: 4:05 (Single version); 3:59 (Album version)
- Label: Third Man
- Songwriter: Jack White
- Producer: Jack White

Jack White singles chronology
"Ice Station Zebra" (2018)	"Taking Me Back" (2021)	"Love Is Selfish" (2022)

"Taking Me Back" is a song by American rock musician Jack White. Released on 18 October 2021, it was his first new solo music in over three years. The song served as the lead single from his 2022 album Fear of the Dawn, and its B-side, a mellower acoustic re-recording of the song entitled "Taking Me Back (Gently)", was also the first song released from his second album of 2022, Entering Heaven Alive.

== Composition ==
Musically, "Taking Me Back" has been described as hard rock and garage rock. The song features a relatively minimal arrangement in which White himself plays every instrument, such as guitar with effects over it paired with drums and other percussion as well as various synthesizers. Wall of Sound stated that the song's structure "crescendos into an instrumental medley which holds the track’s rhythm in a wonderful way", and the track overall was described by Stereogum as a "serrated riff-rocker with yelpy electric-shock vocals and some unhinged guitar action".

== Release and promotion ==
Jack White first hinted at new music in an interview with Telegraph on September 30, 2021, while a more straightforward tease was made in a post on his official Instagram account on October 14. "Taking Me Back" was officially revealed on October 18, 2021, as part of the soundtrack and promotional campaign of the video game Call of Duty: Vanguard, and on that same day a lyric video featuring footage from the game was uploaded to White's YouTube channel along with a visualizer for "Taking Me Back (Gently)". The lyric video was also uploaded to the official Call of Duty YouTube channel two days later.

On November 11, 2021, it was revealed that the songs were tied to two new upcoming studio albums, with the titles and tracklists of both Fear of the Dawn and Entering Heaven Alive being revealed on White's website. Also on November 11, the official music video for "Taking Me Back" - directed by Jack White and Lauren Dunn - was premiered on White's YouTube Channel, gaining almost a million views within its first week on the site. On January 7, 2022, White uploaded a video of an in-studio live rehearsal of the track to YouTube to introduce the lineup of his backing band for the Supply Chain Issues Tour that he would begin on April 8 of that year in support of both Fear of the Dawn and Entering Heaven Alive.

The song was also used by TNT and TBS for their coverage of the 2022 Stanley Cup playoffs. White performed the song as part of a medley with the title track of Fear of the Dawn on the February 25, 2023, episode of Saturday Night Live.

== Reception ==
"Taking Me Back" was met with primarily positive reviews, and was White's first song as a solo artist to top a Billboard chart. In a review that gives the song a 9/10 score, Redbrick states that the "enthralling" track "boasts [the] raw, exhilarating, and electrifying energy for which [Jack White] is known and loved", describing its guitar solo as "face-melting" and concluding that White has made an "exciting, vociferous, and energetic" comeback. Wall of Sound commented that "White is on point more than ever and spills awesome grooves across the track", additionally stating that the song's pairing with its mellow counterpart shows "[impressive] diversity" and that "the concept of two different versions is fantastic". Premier Guitar called the track "incendiary", Pitchfork described it as "raging", The Guardian dubbed it "a bop", and NME envisioned it as "riding a storm of fuzz rock riffs [as it] sets out on the road to rock redemption". In relation to his previous work, Variety characterized the "hard rocking" track as featuring "skronking guitar effects" reminiscent of White's previous album – 2018's divisively experimental Boarding House Reach – while Rolling Stone found White to be "[back] in his wheelhouse of percussive, blown-out rock & roll".

== Track listing ==
Digital release and 7-inch vinyl (Third Man TMR 748)

Side A
No.	Title	Length
1.	"Taking Me Back"	4:05

Side B
No.	Title	Length
1.	"Taking Me Back (Gently)"	4:36

== Personnel ==
- Jack White – vocals, guitar, drums, bass, synthesizer, percussion, production, engineering, and mixing
- Joshua V. Smith – engineering and mixing
- Bill Skibbe – mixing and mastering

== Charts ==
Chart performance for "Taking Me Back"
Chart (2021–2022)	Peak position
Canada Rock (Billboard)	4
New Zealand Hot Singles (RMNZ)	29
US Hot Rock & Alternative Songs (Billboard)	27
US Rock & Alternative Airplay (Billboard)	1
