= Supply Chain Issues Tour =

2022 concert tour by Jack White

- Tour by Jack White
- Location: Asia; Europe; North America; Oceania; South America
- Associated album: Fear of the Dawn; Entering Heaven Alive
- Start date: April 8, 2022
- End date: February 24, 2023
- No. of shows: 96
- Supporting acts: Sugar Tradition; Olivia Jean; Geese; July Talk; Men I Trust; Be Your Own Pet; Starcrawler; JD McPherson; Briston Maroney; Chicano Batman; Natalie Bergman; The Afghan Whigs; The Kills; The Backseat Lovers; Delvon Lamarr Organ Trio; Chubby and the Gang; Yard Act; SONS; Doctor Victor; KO KO MO; Larkin Poe; Equal Idiots; Mdou Moctar; Ezra Furman; Cherry Glazerr; Cautious Clay; Glove; Wet Leg

Jack White concert chronology
- Boarding House Reach Tour (2018); Supply Chain Issues Tour (2022–2023); No Name Tour (2024–2025)

The Supply Chain Issues Tour was a concert tour by American musician Jack White, in support of his fourth and fifth studio albums, respectively, Fear of the Dawn and Entering Heaven Alive (2022). The tour began on April 8, 2022, in Detroit, Michigan and ended on February, 24, 2023 in Aspen, Colorado.

== Background ==
On November 11, 2021, White announced that he would release two studio albums in 2022, Fear of the Dawn and Entering Heaven Alive. A month later, White announced the tour alongside concert dates and festival appearances in North America and Europe.

During the first show of the entire tour, in Detroit, White proposed to his girlfriend Olivia Jean, who had also served as the opening act, during the song "Hotel Yorba". The couple were married during the encore by White's business partner Ben Swank.

== Opening acts ==
On March 15, 2022, White announced the supporting acts that would be accompanying him during the tour. Punk rock quartet Be Your Own Pet is set to reunite and perform after fourteen-year hiatus. Along with the band, Sugar Tradition, Olivia Jean, Geese, July Talk, Men I Trust, Starcrawler, JD McPherson, Briston Maroney, Chicano Batman, Natalie Bergman, The Afghan Whigs, The Kills, The Backseat Lovers, Delvon Lamarr Organ Trio, Chubby and the Gang, Yard Act, SONS, Doctor Victor, KO KO MO, Larkin Poe, Equal Idiots, Mdou Moctar, Ezra Furman, Cherry Glazerr, Cautious Clay, Ichi-Bons, and Glove would join White as the tour openers.

== Set list ==
This set list is from the concert on April 8, 2022, in Detroit, Michigan. It is not intended to represent all tour dates.

1. "Taking Me Back"
2. "Fear of the Dawn"
3. "Dead Leaves and the Dirty Ground"
4. "Love Interruption"
5. "Love Is Selfish"
6. "I Cut Like a Buffalo"
7. "Lazaretto"
8. "Love Is Blindness" (U2 cover)
9. "We're Going to Be Friends"
10. "You Don't Understand Me"
11. "I'm Slowly Turning Into You"
12. "Ball and Biscuit"
13. "Hotel Yorba"

Encore

14. "Steady, As She Goes"
15. "Seven Nation Army"

== Tour dates ==
List of 2022 concerts, showing date, city, country, venue and opening acts
Date	City	Country	Venue	Opening acts
April 8, 2022	Detroit	United States	Masonic Temple Theatre	Sugar Tradition; Olivia Jean
April 9, 2022	Detroit	United States	Masonic Temple Theatre	Sugar Tradition; Olivia Jean
April 10, 2022	Grand Rapids	United States	Van Andel Arena	Olivia Jean
April 12, 2022	Chicago	United States	Credit Union 1 Arena	Geese
April 13, 2022	Cincinnati	United States	Andrew J. Brady ICON Music Center	Geese
April 14, 2022	Pittsburgh	United States	Petersen Events Center	Geese
April 16, 2022	Laval	Canada	Place Bell	July Talk
April 17, 2022	Boston	United States	Agganis Arena	Men I Trust
April 19, 2022	Washington, D.C.	United States	The Anthem	Men I Trust
April 21, 2022	Brooklyn	United States	Barclays Center	Be Your Own Pet
April 23, 2022	Portsmouth	United States	Atlantic Union Bank Pavilion	Starcrawler
April 24, 2022 (Note: The concert on April 24, 2022 at the Riverfront Park in North Charleston is a part of High Water Festival.)	North Charleston	United States	Riverfront Park	—N/a
April 26, 2022	Atlanta	United States	Tabernacle	Starcrawler
April 27, 2022	Atlanta	United States	Tabernacle	JD McPherson
April 28, 2022	Atlanta	United States	Tabernacle	Be Your Own Pet
April 30, 2022	Nashville	United States	Ascend Amphitheater	Be Your Own Pet
May 1, 2022	Nashville	United States	Ascend Amphitheater	JD McPherson
May 23, 2022	Irving	United States	The Pavilion at Toyota Music Factory	Briston Maroney
May 24, 2022	Tulsa	United States	BOK Center	Briston Maroney
May 25, 2022	Austin	United States	Moody Center	Chicano Batman
May 27, 2022	El Paso	United States	El Paso County Coliseum	Chicano Batman
May 28, 2022	Phoenix	United States	Arizona Federal Theatre	Chicano Batman
May 29, 2022	Las Vegas	United States	The Chelsea at The Cosmopolitan	Chicano Batman
May 31, 2022	Los Angeles	United States	YouTube Theater	Natalie Bergman
June 1, 2022	Los Angeles	United States	YouTube Theater	The Paranoyds
June 3, 2022	Reno	United States	Reno Events Center	Natalie Bergman
June 4, 2022	Mountain View	United States	Shoreline Amphitheatre	The Kills
June 6, 2022	Portland	United States	Moda Center	The Backseat Lovers
June 7, 2022	Vancouver	Canada	Pacific Coliseum	The Backseat Lovers
June 8, 2022	Seattle	United States	Climate Pledge Arena	The Backseat Lovers
June 10, 2022	Salt Lake City	United States	USANA Amphitheatre	Delvon Lamarr Organ Trio
June 11, 2022	Broomfield	United States	1stBank Center	Delvon Lamarr Organ Trio
June 27, 2022	London	England	Eventim Apollo	Chubby and the Gang
June 28, 2022	London	England	Eventim Apollo	Yard Act
June 30, 2022	Cologne	Germany	Palladium	Chubby and the Gang
July 1, 2022	Amsterdam	Netherlands	AFAS Live	Yard Act
July 2, 2022	Leipzig	Germany	Haus Auensee	SONS
July 4, 2022	Berlin	Germany	Verti Music Hall	SONS
July 5, 2022	Prague	Czech Republic	Forum Karlin	Doctor Victor
July 7, 2022	Lyon	France	La Radiant	Ko Ko Mo
July 8, 2022 (Note: The concert on July 8, 2022 at the Parc del Fòrum in Barcelona is a part of Cruïlla.)	Barcelona	Spain	Parc del Fòrum	—N/a
July 10, 2022 (Note: The concert on July 10, 2022 at the IFEMA in Madrid is a part of Mad Cool.)	Madrid	Spain	IFEMA	—N/a
July 12, 2022 (Note: The concert on July 12, 2022 at the Jean-Deschamps Théâtre in Carcassonne is a part of Festival de Carcassonne.)	Carcassonne	France	Jean-Deschamps Théâtre	Ko Ko Mo
July 14, 2022	Zürich	Switzerland	Samsung Hall	Larkin Poe
July 15, 2022	Frankfurt	Germany	Jahrhunderthalle	Larkin Poe
July 16, 2022	Brussels	Belgium	Forest National	Equal Idiots
July 18, 2022	Paris	France	L'Olympia	Mdou Moctar
July 19, 2022	Paris	France	L'Olympia	Mdou Moctar
July 20, 2022	Paris	France	L'Olympia	Mdou Moctar
July 30, 2022 (Note: The concert on July 30, 2022 at the Naeba Ski Resort in Yuzawa is a part of Fuji Rock Festival.)	Yuzawa	Japan	Naeba Ski Resort	—N/a
August 13, 2022	Minneapolis	United States	Minneapolis Armory	Starcrawler
August 14, 2022	West Des Moines	United States	Val Air Ballroom	Ezra Furman
August 16, 2022	Milwaukee	United States	UW–Milwaukee Panther Arena	Ezra Furman
August 17, 2022	Indianapolis	United States	TCU Amphitheater at White River State Park	Ezra Furman
August 19, 2022	Toronto	Canada	Budweiser Stage	July Talk
August 21, 2022	Lewiston	United States	Artpark	Cherry Glazerr
August 23, 2022	Portland	United States	Cross Insurance Arena	Cautious Clay
August 24, 2022	Baltimore	United States	Pier Six Pavilion	Cautious Clay
August 25, 2022	Charlotte	United States	Metro Credit Union Amphitheatre	Cautious Clay
August 27, 2022	Huntsville	United States	Orion Amphitheater	Glove
August 28, 2022	St. Louis	United States	St. Louis Music Park	Glove
August 29, 2022	Kansas City	United States	Starlight Theatre	Glove
September 15, 2022	Louisville	United States	Bourbon & Beyond	—N/a
September 16, 2022	Asheville	United States	Rabbit Rabbit	The Paranoyds
September 19, 2022	St. Augustine	United States	St. Augustine Amphitheatre	Cat Power
September 20, 2022	Miami	United States	James L. Knight Center	Cat Power
September 21, 2022	Orlando	United States	Hard Rock Live	Cat Power
September 23, 2022	New Orleans	United States	The Filmore	The Paranoyds
September 24, 2022	Houston	United States	Bayou Music Center	The Paranoyds
September 25, 2022	Shreveport	United States	Shreveport Municipal Memorial Auditorium	The Paranoyds
September 27, 2022	Oklahoma City	United States	The Criterion	Ichi-Bons
September 30, 2022	Tucson	United States	Linda Ronstadt Music Hall	Ichi-Bons
October 1, 2022	Dana Point	United States	Ohana Festival	—N/a
October 8, 2022	Guadalajara	Mexico	Coordenada GDL	—N/a
October 9, 2022	Mexico City	Mexico	Pepsi Center WTC	Cat Power
October 12, 2022	Sao Paulo	Brazil	Popload Festival	—N/a
October 14, 2022	Buenos Aires	Argentina	Privamera Sound	—N/a
October 16, 2022	Santiago	Chile	Privamera Sound	—N/a
October 18, 2022	Montevideo	Uruguay	Teatro de Verano	Cat Power
November 5, 2022	Manila	Philippines	SM Aura Premier	—N/a
November 8, 2022	Seoul	South Korea	Yes24 Live Hall	—N/a
November 10, 2022	Ho Chi Minh City	Vietnam	Capital Studio	—N/a
November 12, 2022	Bangkok	Thailand	CTW Live	—N/a
November 14, 2022	Singapore		Star Theatre	—N/a
November 16, 2022	Kuala Lumpur	Malaysia	Zepp Kuala Lumpur	—N/a
November 19, 2022	Adelaide	Australia	Rymill Park	—N/a
November 21, 2022	Christchurch	New Zealand	Christchurch Town Hall	—N/a
December 3, 2022 (Note: The concert on December 3, 2022 at Fort Lauderdale Beach Park in Fort Lauderdale is a part of Audacy Beach Festival.)	Fort Lauderdale	United States	Fort Lauderdale Beach Park	—N/a
December 4, 2022 (Note: The concert on December 4, 2022 at MidFlorida Credit Union Amphitheatre in Tampa is a part of 97X Next Big Thing.)	Tampa	United States	MidFlorida Credit Union Amphitheatre	—N/a
December 7, 2022	Chicago	United States	Empty Bottle	—N/a
December 8, 2022	Chicago	United States	Byline Bank Aragon Ballroom	Wet Leg; Starcrawler

List of 2023 concerts, showing date, city, country, venue and opening acts
Date	City	Country	Venue	Opening acts
January 13, 2023	Los Angeles	United States	The Belasco	Olivia Jean
January 14, 2023 (Note: The concert on January 14, 2023 at the Kia Forum in Inglewood is a part of iHeartRadio ALTer EGO.)	Inglewood	United States	Kia Forum	—N/a
January 16, 2023	Nashville	United States	The Blue Room	—N/a
January 17, 2023	Nashville	United States	The Blue Room	—N/a
February 22, 2023	Brooklyn	United States	Brooklyn Steel	Olivia Jean
February 24, 2023 (Note: The concert on February 24, 2023 at Rio Grande Park in Aspen is a part of Palm Tree Festival.)	Aspen	United States	Rio Grande Park	—N/a
