= Hi-De-Ho =

Hi-De-Ho may refer to:

- Cab Calloway's Hi-De-Ho, a 1934 short film featuring Cab Calloway
- Hi-De-Ho (1947 film), a 1947 film starring Cab Calloway
- "The Hi De Ho Man", a song by Cab Calloway
- "Hi-De-Ho (Jack White song)", a song by Jack White on the 2022 album Fear of the Dawn
- A scat phrase in the 1931 song "Minnie the Moocher" by Cab Calloway
- "Hi-De-Ho" (sometimes alternately or concurrently called "That Old Sweet Roll"), a 1968 song by Carole King & Gerry Goffin, on the 1980 album Pearls: Songs of Goffin and King; also recorded by:
  - Dusty Springfield, as a 1969 b-side to "Willie & Laura Mae Jones"
  - Blood, Sweat & Tears, on the 1970 album Blood, Sweat & Tears 3
  - Bobby Darin, on the 1987 album Live at the Desert Inn
- "Hi-De-Ho", a song by K7 on the 1993 album Swing Batta Swing
- Hi-De-Ho: The Life of Cab Calloway, a 2010 book by Alyn Shipton
