= Hi-De-Ho (Jack White song) =

2022 single by Jack White

Single by Jack White featuring Q-Tip

from the album Fear of the Dawn
- A-side: "Queen of the Bees"
- Released: March 3, 2022
- Genre: Experimental rock; rap rock; experimental hip hop; funk rock; progressive rock; jazz-funk
- Length: 3:57
- Label: Third Man
- Songwriters: Jack White; Kamaal Fareed; Cab Calloway; Buster Harding; Jack Palmer
- Producer: Jack White

Jack White singles chronology
"Fear of the Dawn" (2022)	"Hi-De-Ho" (2022)	"What's the Trick?" (2022)

Q-Tip singles chronology
"New Breed" (2019)	"Hi-De-Ho" (2022)

"Hi-De-Ho" is a song written, produced, and performed by American rock musician Jack White, featuring rapper and producer Q-Tip, former lead of the hip-hop group A Tribe Called Quest, who is also credited for writing the song. It is issued as the third single from White's fourth studio album Fear of the Dawn. It is based on and samples the scat phrase sung by Cab Calloway in the 1943 song, "Hi De Ho Man".

== Background ==
White was first involved with Q-Tip when he brought him out to perform "That Black Bat Licorice" during a show at Madison Square Garden, then performed "Excursions" by A Tribe Called Quest on January 31, 2015.

The production of "Hi-De-Ho" began when White first heard it on the radio, and enjoyed it so much that he had the idea of sampling Calloway's scatting along with a drumbeat. He later invited Q-Tip to be part of the production.

== Promotion and release ==
It was uploaded on White's YouTube channel and released on digital download and streaming on March 3, 2022. A limited edition 7-inch tri-color single paired with A-side, "Queen of the Bees" is available exclusively at Third Man Records Cass Corridor Detroit on April 9, 2022, to promote White's fifth studio album Entering Heaven Alive, released on July 22, along with his Supply Chain Issues Tour.

== Personnel ==
- Jack White – vocals, drums, synthesizers, percussion, lead electric guitar, lead acoustic guitar
- Q-Tip – vocals, handclaps
- Olivia Jean – acoustic rhythm guitar, electric guitar
