= No Name (album) =

Studio album by Jack White
- Released: July 19, 2024 (Note: The album's first release came on July 19, 2024. See Release history for further release dates.)
- Recorded: 2023–2024
- Studio: Third Man (Nashville)
- Genres: Garage rock; blues rock; punk blues
- Length: 43:03
- Label: Third Man
- Producer: Jack White

Jack White chronology
Entering Heaven Alive (2022)	No Name (2024)	Frozen Charlotte (2026)

Singles from No Name
- 1. "That's How I'm Feeling" Released: November 22, 2024; 2. "Archbishop Harold Holmes" Released: March 31, 2025

No Name is the sixth studio album by American rock musician Jack White. It was initially surprise released on vinyl on July 19, 2024, as a gift to customers of Third Man Records, before a wider digital release on August 2, 2024. The record was written, recorded, and produced entirely by White at Third Man Studio in Nashville, Tennessee. Musically, it is a garage rock, blues rock, and punk blues album.

Initially, the album was released through unmarked white vinyl records secretly included with purchases at Third Man Records store locations in Detroit, London, and Nashville, and mailed to vinyl subscribers. A number of copies on blue vinyl were then sold at White's live shows, before a wide release of the album, revealed to be titled No Name, was announced. The unconventional release structure of the album drew attention and has been discussed by media outlets.

No Name received acclaim from music critics, who praised White for returning to his blues and garage roots, and favorably compared it to his work with the White Stripes. It received a nomination for Best Rock Album at the 67th Annual Grammy Awards. The album debuted at number 130 on the Billboard 200, the lowest of White's albums, which is believed to be due to its release method.

== Recording ==
White recorded No Name in 2023 and 2024 at Third Man Studio in Nashville. White produced the album solo and mixed it alongside Bill Skibbe. The album features contributions from White's wife Olivia Jean, who provided bass and drums on some tracks, as well as White's daughter Scarlett, who played bass on two tracks.

== Composition ==
No Name has generally been described musically as garage rock, blues rock, and punk blues. Many commentators noted the album's distinctly raw nature, as well as a similarity to the sound championed by White when he initially became popular with the White Stripes. Lee DeVito of the Detroit Metro Times described the album's sound as being "more stripped down and guitar-heavy" than White's previous two albums, Fear of the Dawn and Entering Heaven Alive (both 2022). On his WDET-FM radio show, Ryan Patrick Hooper described the album as being "dirty, grimy, [and] gritty".

== Release ==
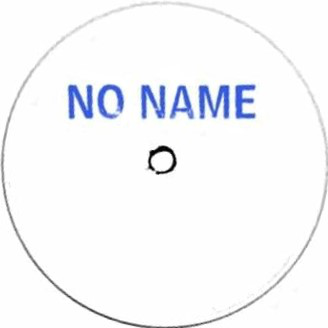
The white label of the album's original vinyl release, showing its "NO NAME" stamp

On July 19, 2024, Third Man Records included a free 12-inch vinyl record with all purchases made at their store locations in Detroit, London, and Nashville, without offering customers any details about the record. Employees at the locations were also not briefed about the record's contents, only being instructed by their management to include it with every purchase made free of charge. The record was also mailed to certain members of the Third Man Vault vinyl subscription service. The white-colored record consists of a generic white sleeve with a white label that only has "No Name" in all-capitals stamped onto it. Side A of the record has "Heaven and Hell" etched into its dead wax area, while side B has "Black and Blue" etched into it. The record was also given the catalog number TMR-1000.

News about the record spread online through word of mouth after customers realized that White was the artist of the record, and that it was an entirely new album of original recordings from him. This method of releasing the album was compared to when White hid 7-inch vinyl singles inside of furniture when he previously worked as an upholsterer. Detroit's public radio station WDET-FM also played a selection of songs from the album live on the air after radio show host Ryan Patrick Hooper obtained the album while shopping at Third Man earlier in the day. Later that day, Third Man took to social media to encourage those who obtained the record to rip its audio digitally and share it online. Vinyl copies of the album were put up for sale on eBay shortly after release, generally being priced between $500 and $1,000.

Shortly after the album's release on July 27, White played a show at American Legion Post 82 in Nashville where new LP copies of No Name on blue vinyl with a cover art, track titles, and liner notes were made available for attendees to purchase. White announced on July 31 that No Name would receive a digital release on August 2 as well as releases on blue vinyl, limited to independent record stores, and standard black vinyl; Third Man stores sold the album exclusively one day early, on August 1. A music video for "That's How I'm Feeling" composed of montaged live show footage was released on September 12.

== Critical reception ==
Professional ratings
Aggregate scores
Source	Rating
AnyDecentMusic?	8.2/10
Metacritic	86/100
Review scores
Source	Rating
AllMusic	4/5 stars
Exclaim!	7/10
The Guardian	4/5 stars
The Line of Best Fit	8/10
Mojo	4/5 stars
MusicOMH	4.5/5 stars
Paste	9.0/10
Pitchfork	7.6/10
Rolling Stone	4/5 stars
Uncut	9/10

According to review aggregator Metacritic, No Name received "universal acclaim" based on a weighted average score of 86 out of 100 from 17 critic scores. Variety's Jem Aswad lauded the album as "the freshest and most exciting rock and roll album to come down the pike in years", also applauding White's ability to return to his original White Stripes sound "without seeming retro or leaning too heavily on nostalgia". Paste's Matt Mitchell considered No Name to be White's best solo album to date, as well his third-best album when including his band works, while Uncut's Peter Watts said that it "has some of White's most memorable riffs since Blunderbuss and is his most red-blooded rock record since Elephant". Ross Horton of musicOMH called No Name "wonderful, magical, truthful and the most consistently surprising rock album of the year by some margin", complimenting the album's consistency in particular.

Mojo's John Mulvey wrote that "No Name is packed end to end with tracks that balance great riffs and catchy tunes" and that White continues to be "a master at expressing his range within tight, self-imposed restrictions". The Guardian's Stevie Chick praised the album as one of White's best, calling it "dark, heavy, thrilling, beautiful." Chick wrote that the album finds White sounding "leaner and sharper than he has for some time" and commended it for recapturing his "gift for heavy rock studded with hooks and a pop-oriented lightness of step." Rolling Stone's Jon Dolan lauded White's ability to merge the straightforward rock sound of his past with the experimental nature of his recent works, additionally complimenting the album's conciseness and certain moments that he felt were akin to the works of artists like Willie Dixon, Led Zeppelin, and the Stooges. Writing for AllMusic, Mark Deming called No Name "the most straightforward rock & roll album he has delivered in some time", adding that it was "the sort of idiosyncratic but lean and mean rock album he's needed to make for a while".

Evan Rytlewski of Pitchfork complimented the "all killer, no filler ethos" of No Name, considering it to be a step up from the experimental approaches White took on his previous solo albums as well as a comeback album for his discography. Additionally, he celebrated White's decision to revisit the earlier sound that launched his career, adding that "even the last couple of White Stripes albums weren't this stacked". Alex Hudson of Exclaim! wrote that despite the album not being "quite as white-knuckled as the first time White made music like this, nor is it as hooky as those White Stripes songs that took them from underground weirdos to superstars", he nevertheless enjoyed White's return to the sound he originally broke out and became popular with.

In regards to White's method of releasing No Name, Brian McCollum of the Detroit Free Press applauded White's choice to release the album secretly, without announcement, and only through vinyl, claiming that he "made a stand for rock mystique" as a result. He also felt that the album's physical-only release falling on the same day as the CrowdStrike outage added to the returned prestige of both vinyl records and physical media as a whole, adding that "the Internet was a sideshow to the real magic of White's Friday gambit. The quiet album rollout wasn't just a clever, headline-grabbing gimmick. It was a throwback to the days when mystique meant something as a music lover." Noah Barker of The Line of Best Fit similarly praised White's ability to maintain his mystique in the digital age, saying: "Modern music releasing has made easier the focus-grouping, corporatization of music, but also the hyper-individualization of art. You can cut your tree and let it fall extravagantly, and if it's never heard by another soul, that's your mystery to keep. White lets a new mystique seep through on every release, a different angle into a wondrously fretful mind".

=== Year-end lists ===
Numerous critics and publications listed No Name in their year-end ranking of the best albums of 2024, often inside the top fifteen.

Select year-end rankings for No Name
Publication/critic	Accolade	Rank	Ref.
Exclaim!	50 Best Albums of 2024	13	
MOJO	The Best Albums Of 2024	1	
Rough Trade UK	Albums of the Year 2024	29	
Time Out	The Best Albums of 2024	14	
Uncut	80 Best Albums of 2024	15	

== Track listing ==
All tracks are written by Jack White

Side A: Heaven and Hell
No.	Title	Length
1.	"Old Scratch Blues"	3:30
2.	"Bless Yourself"	2:34
3.	"That's How I'm Feeling"	3:11
4.	"It's Rough on Rats (If You're Asking)"	4:09
5.	"Archbishop Harold Holmes"	2:51
6.	"Bombing Out"	2:32
7.	"What's the Rumpus?"	3:23

Side B: Black and Blue
No.	Title	Length
8.	"Tonight (Was a Long Time Ago)"	4:11
9.	"Underground"	3:45
10.	"Number One With a Bullet"	3:19
11.	"Morning at Midnight"	3:05
12.	"Missionary"	2:29
13.	"Terminal Archenemy Endling"	4:04
Total length:		43:03

== Personnel ==
Personnel adapted from album liner notes.

Musicians

- Jack White – guitar (all tracks), vocals (all tracks), keys (track 3), drums (track 3)
- Patrick Keeler – drums (tracks 1–4, 6, 8–10, 12, 13), percussion (tracks 1–3, 6, 9, 13)
- Dominic Davis – bass (tracks 3, 4, 6, 7, 10, 12)
- Olivia Jean – bass (track 1), drums (track 3)
- David Swanson – bass (track 2), keys (track 13)
- Daru Jones – drums (tracks 3, 7, 11), percussion (tracks 3, 7)
- Quincy McCrary – keyboards (tracks 3, 7, 10)
- Dan Mancini – additional bass (track 3)
- Carla Azar – drums (track 5), percussion (track 5)
- Scarlett White – bass (tracks 5, 9)

Technical personnel

- Bernie Grundman – mastering
- Dan Mancini – engineering assistant
- Shibby Poole – engineering assistant
- Bill Skibbe – mixing, engineering
- Josh Smith – additional engineering (track 3)
- Jack White – production, mixing

Other personnel

- Roe Peterhans – layout
- Henry White – cover art
- Jack White – cover art, photography
- Scarlett White – cover art
- Jordan Williams – layout

== Charts ==
Chart performance for No Name
Chart (2024)	Peak position
Australian Vinyl Albums (ARIA)	9
Austrian Albums (Ö3 Austria)	14
Belgian Albums (Ultratop Flanders)	23
Belgian Albums (Ultratop Wallonia)	31
Croatian International Albums (HDU)	10
German Albums (Offizielle Top 100)	20
New Zealand Albums (RMNZ)	34
Polish Albums (ZPAV)	67
Scottish Albums (Official Charts)	6
Swedish Physical Albums (Sverigetopplistan)	9
Swiss Albums (Schweizer Hitparade)	7
UK Albums (Official Charts)	33
UK Independent Albums (Official Charts)	1
US Billboard 200	108

== Release history ==
Region	Date	Format	Label	Catalog no.
United Kingdom United States	July 19, 2024	White 12-inch vinyl; Third Man Records exclusive	Third Man	TMR-1000
United Kingdom United States	July 27, 2024; August 1, 2024	Blue 12-inch vinyl; concert and independent record store exclusive	Third Man	TMR-1000
Various	August 2, 2024	Download and streaming	Third Man	TMR-1000
Various	September 13, 2024	Black 12-inch vinyl	Third Man	TMR-1000
Various	September 13, 2024	CD	Third Man	TMR-1000

== Notes and references ==
Notes
