= The Black Belles =

American all-female rock band

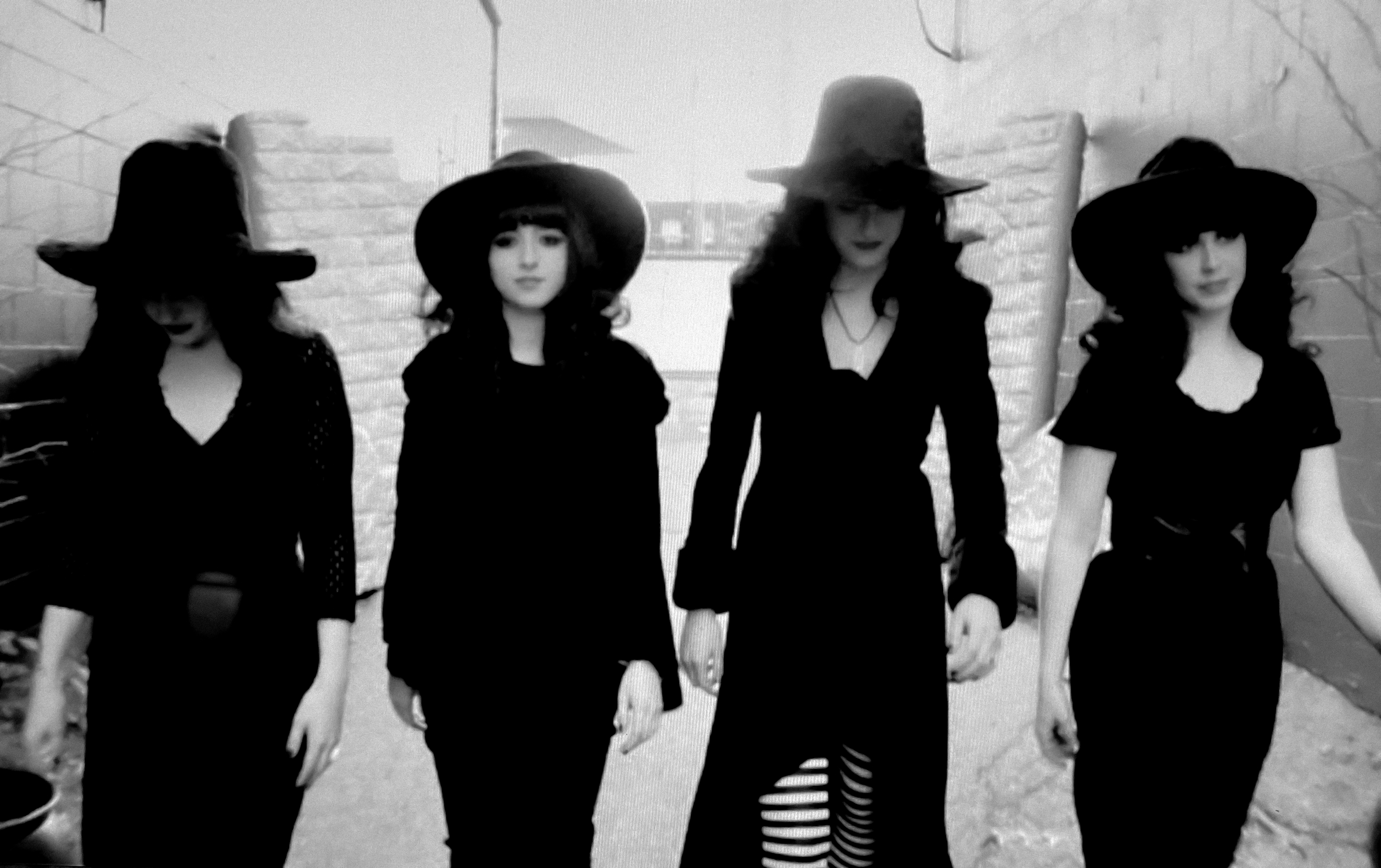

Background information
- Origin: Nashville, Tennessee
- Genres: Gothic rock; garage rock
- Years active: 2009–2012 (hiatus)
- Labels: Third Man Records
- Members: Olivia Jean; Ruby Rogers; Shelby Lynne
- Past members: Christina Norwood; Lil' Boo; Erin Belle

The Black Belles is an American all-female "garage goth" rock band formed in Nashville in 2009. The band consist of Olivia Jean (vocals, guitar, keyboard), Ruby Rogers (bass guitar, backing vocals), and Shelby Lynne (drums, backing vocals). Former musicians include Tina NoGood (keyboard), Lil' Boo (keyboard), and Erin Belle.

== History ==
The Black Belles were formed in 2009 in Nashville, Tennessee. Original members consisted of musicians Olivia Jean (vocals, guitar), Ruby Rogers (bass guitar), and Shelby Lynn (drums, percussion). In 2009 Jack White, musician and founder of Third Man Records, discovered and signed The Black Belles to his label.

Prior to the bands formation White received a demo of solo recordings by Jean. In 2009, Jean was invited by White to record her songs in Nashville at Third Man Records. Because Jean did not have a band, White introduced her to musicians Shelby Lynne and Ruby Rogers. The group went into the studio and recorded a handful of Jean's original songs. Regarding their start with Third Man Records, Jean said in an interview, "I did it for myself, but I didn't play anything live, because I didn't have a band. But once we all met, we kind of collaborated together and shared ideas, threw all those ideas together and we had a lot of material to work with."

After their success in the studio, the group decided to become a band. The band name was inspired by the legend of Bell Witch Cave located in Adams, Tennessee. The band's musical style and aesthetic is heavily based on their mutual interest in garage rock, goth rock, and goth culture. They are known for wearing their signature wide brimmed hats that resemble witches hats. The band's gothic look and sound later led to a collaboration with television host and scream queen icon Elvira.

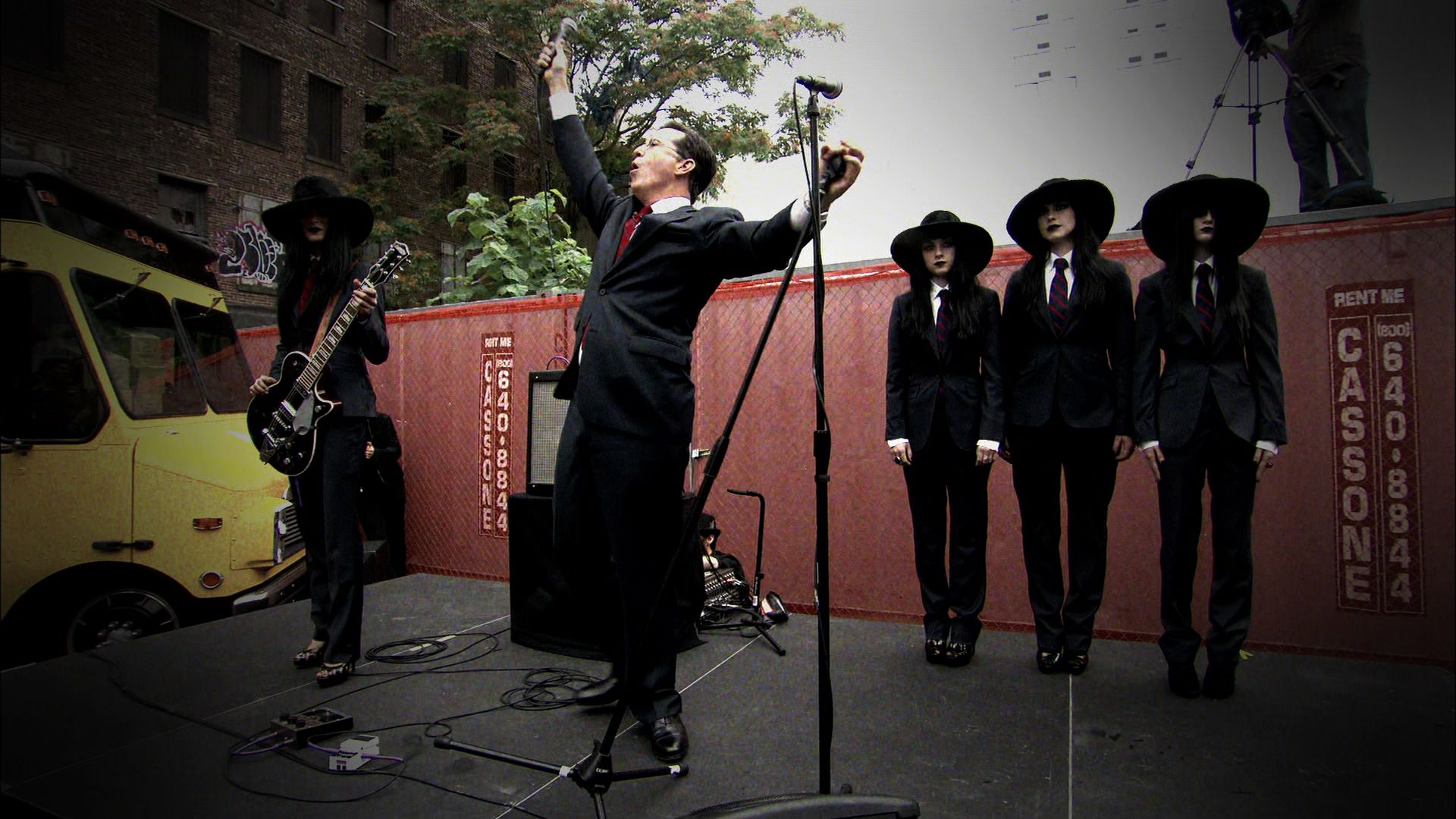
The Black Belles and Stephen Colbert performing "Charlene II (I'm Over You)"

In 2010 Jack White produced the band's first single consisting of "What Can I Do?" (a song from Jean's demo) and a cover of The Knickerbockers "Lies".

The bands debut album The Black Belles, also produced by Jack White, was released on October 8, 2011.

The band gained attention re-releasing "What Can I Do?" with Elvira, who used the song as the theme for her television show Elvira's Movie Macabre. In 2011, the band recorded a single with comedian and talk show host Stephen Colbert. The single was based on Colbert's comedic love song "Charlene (I'm Right Behind You)". The Black Belles performed the b-side of the single "Charlene II (I'm Right Behind You)" live on The Colbert Report.

The band saw moderate success with touring; however, in 2012 the band was put on hiatus. Olivia Jean went on to pursue her career as a solo artist. In 2014, Jean released her solo album, Bathtub Love Killings, also with Third Man Records.

== Discography ==
=== Albums ===
Year	Title
2011	The Black Belles: Released: 8 November 2011; Format: CD, LP and Digital Download

=== Singles ===
Year	Title
2010	"What Can I Do?" / "Lies"
2010	Elvira's Movie Macabre Theme / "What Can I Do?"
2011	"Charlene II (I'm Over You)" / "Charlene II (I'm Right Behind You)" (Stephen Colbert featuring The Black Belles)
2011	"Honky Tonk Horror"
2012	"Wishing Well" / "Ms. Black Boots"
