= Delvon Lamarr Organ Trio =

American soul/jazz trio

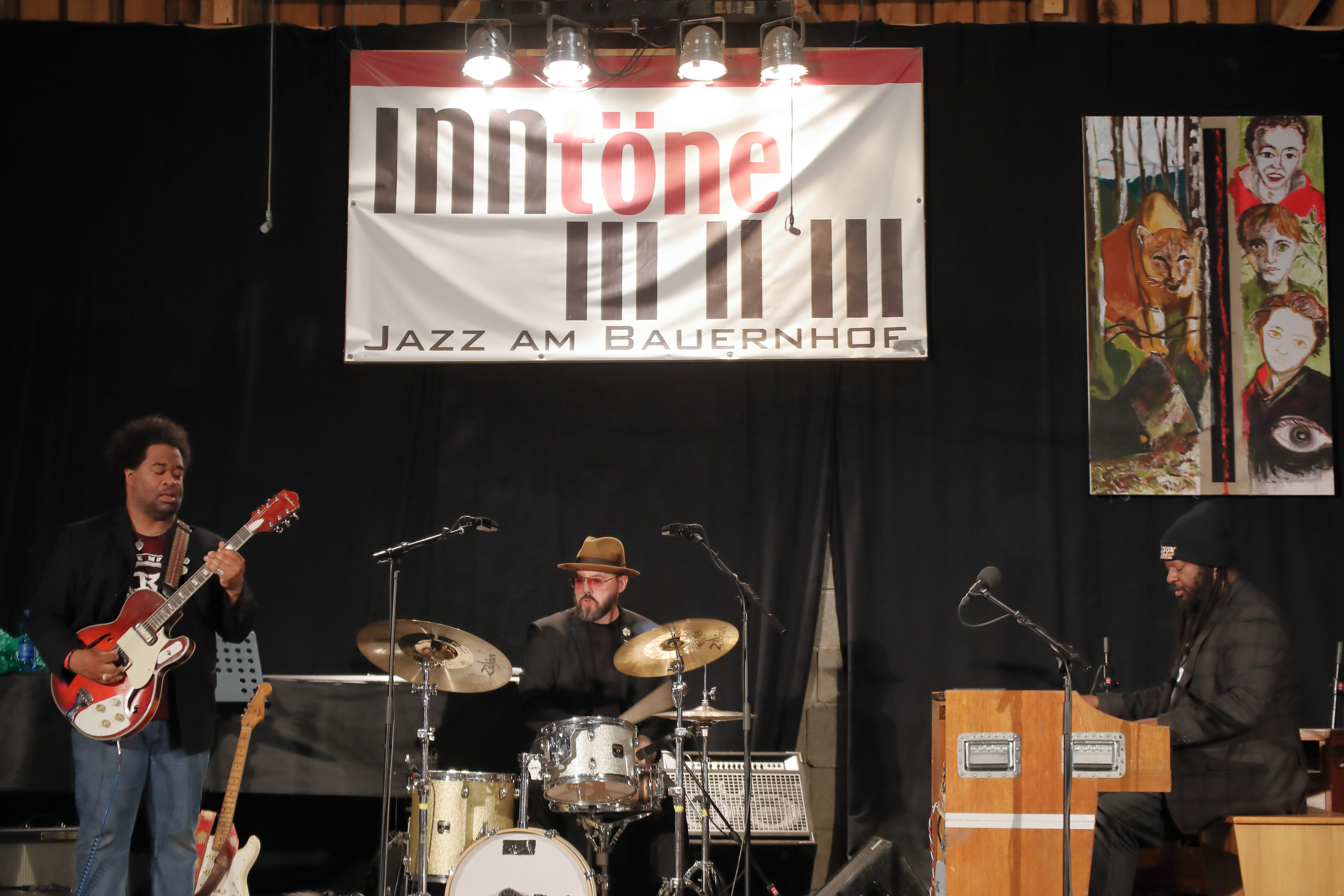
- INNtöne Jazzfestival 2019

Background information
- Origin: Seattle, Washington, U.S.
- Genre: Soul jazz
- Years active: 2015–present
- Label: Colemine
- Members: Delvon Lamarr; Brice Calvin; Ashley Ickes
- Past members: David McGraw; Colin Higgins; Keith Laudieri; Doug Octa Port; Dan Weiss; Jimmy James; Julian MacDonough; Miles "Smiles" Harris
- Website: dlo3music.com

The Delvon Lamarr Organ Trio, also known as DLO3, is an American soul-jazz group founded in 2015. The band has released five albums. Their debut album, titled Close But No Cigar, charted at number one on the U.S. Contemporary Jazz Albums chart.

== Career ==
The Delvon Lamarr Organ Trio was founded in 2015 and originally consisted of keyboardist Delvon Lamarr (Dumas) on Hammond B-3, guitarist Colin Higgins and drummer David McGraw. Soon after guitarist Jimmy James (Williams) replaced Higgins. All members had been active instrumentalists in the Seattle music scene. With the help of Lamarr's wife, Amy Novo (AKA "Shortcake Mafia"), acting as manager and booking agent, the group was solidified. Originally a drummer and trumpet player, Lamarr switched to organ at the age of 22. He said he picked up the instrument naturally by observing organist/keyboardist Joe Doria, whose band Lamarr was drumming in at the time. James and McGraw had previously co-founded "The True Loves", a Seattle-based nine-piece soul band.

The DLO3 has toured in the United States and abroad and has performed in several music festivals including the Detroit and the Monterey Jazz Festivals. The trio's debut album Close But No Cigar was originally released in 2016 (on CD), and was re-released in March 2018 (on both LP and CD) by Colemine Records. The album reached number one on the U.S. Contemporary Jazz Albums chart and number three on the U.S. Jazz Albums chart. In April 2018, the band released a live album titled Live at KEXP! (on both LP and CD) that was recorded May 13, 2017. It reached number 10 on the Jazz Albums chart. In 2018 the band toured nationally and in Europe in support of the albums. In late 2018, drummer Doug Octa Port replaced McGraw. Drummer Michael Duffy joined the band for their 2019 European Tour. New drummer, Dan "Vanilla" Weiss (from "The Sextones") joined in 2021. As of August 2022, drummer Julian "Thunderfoot" MacDonough will be replacing Weiss.

On January 29, 2021, the group released their sophomore studio album I Told You So via Colemine Records. The album debuted atop multiple Billboard Charts: number one on the Contemporary Jazz Album chart, number three on the Jazz Album chart, number four on the Tastemaker Album chart, and number 12 on the Heatseeker Album chart.

Jimmy James left the band to pursue a new project ('Parlor Greens'), and was replaced in January 2023 by guitarist, Miles "Smiles" Harris. A finger injury sustained shortly after joining the band meant that Harris was sidelined, for their 2023 UK tour at least, and the DLO3 consisted of Delvon Lamarr, Josh Perdue on guitar, and Ehssan "Ace" Karimi on drums.

== Style ==
The band's is an organ trio whose music is rhythm-based and rooted in the 1950's, 60's and 70's soul-jazz, funk and blues styles, reminiscent of Booker T. & the M.G.'s and The Meters. Bandleader Lamarr described it as "soul music with a strong jazz influence". He credits their 'sound' to the chemistry of the band members.

== Band members ==
Current members

- Delvon Lamarr – Hammond B-3 organ (2015–present)
- Brice Calvin – guitar (2025–present)
- Ashley Ickes – drums (2025–present)

Former

- Colin Higgins – guitar (2015)
- Jimmy James – guitar (2015–2022)
- Miles "Smiles" Harris – guitar (2023–2025)
- David McGraw – drums (2015–2018)
- Doug Octa Port – drums (2018–2021)
- Keith Laudieri – drums (2019) (touring member only)
- Michael Duffy – drums (2019) (touring member only)
- Dan "Vanilla" Weiss – drums (2021–2022)
- Julian "Thunderfoot" MacDonough – drums (2022–2025)

== Discography ==
LP/CD releases

- Close But No Cigar (Novo Productions, 2016; reissue: Colemine CLMN-12019, 2018)
- Live at KEXP! (Colemine CLMN-12020, recorded 5/13/17 [released 2018])
- I Told You So (Colemine CLMN-12028, 2021)
- Cold As Weiss (Colemine CLMN-12029, 2022)
- Live In Loveland! (Colemine CLMN-12027, recorded 4/21/18 [released 2022])

45rpm vinyl singles

- "Concussion" (Colemine CLMN-150 A, 2017)
- "Memphis" (Colemine CLMN-150 B, 2017)
- "Fo Sho" (Colemine CLMN-199 A, 2020)
- "Inner City Blues" (Colemine CLMN-199 B, 2020)
- "Jimmy's Groove (Pt. 1)" (Colemine CLMN-207 A, 2021)
- "Jimmy's Groove (Pt. 2)" (Colemine CLMN-207 B, 2021)
- "Cold As Weiss" (Colemine CLMN-224 A, 2021)
- "Fried Soul" (Colemine CLMN-224 B, 2021)
- "Chicken Leg" (Colemine CLMN-269 A, 2026)
- "If I Could" (Colemine CLMN-269 B, 2026)
