= Fear of the Dawn =

Studio album by Jack White
- Released: April 8, 2022
- Recorded: 2021
- Studio: Third Man Studio (Nashville)
- Genres: Blues rock; progressive rock; hard rock; garage rock
- Length: 39:54
- Label: Third Man
- Producer: Jack White

Jack White chronology
Boarding House Reach (2018)	Fear of the Dawn (2022)	Entering Heaven Alive (2022)

Singles from Fear of the Dawn
- 1. "Taking Me Back" Released: October 18, 2021; 2. "Fear of the Dawn" Released: January 14, 2022; 3. "Hi-De-Ho" Released: March 3, 2022; 4. "What's the Trick?" Released: April 7, 2022

Fear of the Dawn is the fourth studio album by the American rock musician Jack White, released on April 8, 2022, through Third Man Records. The album was written in Nashville and recorded throughout 2021 at Third Man Studio. It was ranked as the 13th best guitar album of 2022 by Guitar World readers.

== Promotion and release ==
In October 2021, White released "Taking Me Back", his first solo single since 2018. In November, White revealed that he would release two solo albums in 2022: Fear of the Dawn, which will feature White's traditional rock sound, and Entering Heaven Alive, a folk album, planned for release on July 22. White released a video for "Taking Me Back" on November 11.

In December 2021, White announced the Supply Chain Issues Tour kicking off on April 8, 2022, in Detroit, Michigan. The tour covers North America and Europe. On February 11, 2022, White released the title track "Fear of the Dawn" as the B-side of the lead single from Entering Heaven Alive, "Love Is Selfish", and uploaded the music video for "Fear of the Dawn" on YouTube the same day. On March 3, 2022, White released the song "Hi-De-Ho" (which features rapper Q-Tip, formerly of hip hop group A Tribe Called Quest) as the second standalone single from Fear of the Dawn. Finally on April 7, 2022, White released "What's the Trick?" as one last surprise single the day before the album was released.

Fear of the Dawn was released on April 8, 2022.

== Critical reception ==
Professional ratings
Aggregate scores
Source	Rating
AnyDecentMusic?	7.4/10
Metacritic	75/100
Review scores
Source	Rating
AllMusic	4/5 stars
American Songwriter	4.5/5 stars
DIY	4.5/5 stars
Entertainment Weekly	B
The Independent	2/5 stars
NME	3/5 stars
Paste	6.5/10
Pitchfork	6.5/10
PopMatters	9/10
Rolling Stone	2.5/5 stars

According to the review aggregator Metacritic, Fear of the Dawn received "generally favorable reviews" based on a weighted average score of 75 out of 100 from 23 critic scores.

== Track listing ==
All tracks are written by Jack White, except where noted.

Fear of the Dawn track listing
No.	Title	Writer(s)	Length
1.	"Taking Me Back"		3:59
2.	"Fear of the Dawn"		2:02
3.	"The White Raven"		2:43
4.	"Hi-De-Ho" (featuring Q-Tip)	White; Kamaal Fareed; Cab Calloway; Buster Harding; Jack Palmer	3:56
5.	"Eosophobia"		3:41
6.	"Into the Twilight"	White; John Dizzy Gillespie; Frank Paparelli; Jon Hendricks; Jay Graydon; Alan Paul	4:41
7.	"Dusk"		0:30
8.	"What's the Trick?"		3:34
9.	"That Was Then (This Is Now)"		3:10
10.	"Eosophobia (Reprise)"		3:12
11.	"Morning, Noon and Night"		4:45
12.	"Shedding My Velvet"		3:41
Total length:			39:54

Sample credits

- "Hi-De-Ho" contains a sample of "Hi De Ho Man" by Cab Calloway, written by Cab Calloway, Buster Harding and Jack Palmer.
- "Into the Twilight" contains a sample of William S. Burroughs from the track "Origin and Theory of the Tape Cut-Ups" originally released on the album Break Through in Grey Room, produced by James Grauerholz and Bill Rich.
- "Into the Twilight" contains a sample of "Another Night in Tunisia" performed by The Manhattan Transfer, written by John Dizzy Gillespie, Frank Paparelli and Jon Hendricks.
- "Into the Twilight" contains a sample of "Twilight Zone/Twilight Tone" performed by The Manhattan Transfer, music written by Jay Graydon and Alan Paul, lyrics by Alan Paul.

== Personnel ==
Primary artist

- Jack White – vocals (tracks 1–6, 8–12), drums (tracks 1–4, 8, 12), guitar (tracks 1–3, 5–11), bass (tracks 1–3, 8, 12), synthesizers (tracks 1–4, 6), percussion (tracks 1–4, 6, 8, 9, 11), theremin (tracks 2, 3), lead electric guitar (track 4), lead acoustic guitar (track 4), samples (track 6), piano (tracks 6, 12), electric guitar (track 12), vibraphone (track 12), acoustic guitar (track 12)

Session musicians

- Q-Tip – vocals (track 4), handclaps (track 4)
- Olivia Jean – electric guitar (track 4), acoustic rhythm guitar (track 4)
- Daru Jones – drums (tracks 5, 9–11)
- Dominic Davis – bass guitar (tracks 5, 10, 11)
- Quincy McCrary – Wurlitzer electronic piano (tracks 5, 10), Hammond B3 organ (track 6), synthesizer (track 9), harmony vocals (track 9)
- Scarlett White – bass guitar (track 6)
- Mark Watrous – Juno synthesizer (track 7), synthesizer (track 11)
- Bone Dust Mancini – 1975 Harley-Davidson Ironhead (track 8)
- Jack Lawrence – bass guitar (track 9)
- Duane Denison – rhythm guitar (track 11), guitar solo (track 11)

Technical personnel

- Jack White – production, engineering, mixing
- Joshua V. Smith – engineering, mixing
- Bill Skibbe – engineering, mixing, mastering
- Dan Mancini – engineering assistant

Packaging

- Jennifer Dionisio – cover illustration
- Sara Deck – page 1 illustration
- Olivia Jean – page 5 illustration
- Mikel Janín – page 3 illustration
- Ben Jenkins – side 1 label illustration, side 2 label concept, raven
- Bruce Yan – sun emblem, side 2 label illustration
- Johnny Dombrowski – page 4 illustration, back cover illustration, back cover camouflage patterns, paneled illustration

== Charts ==
Chart performance for Fear of the Dawn
Chart (2022)	Peak position
Australian Albums (ARIA)	25
Austrian Albums (Ö3 Austria)	4
Belgian Albums (Ultratop Flanders)	12
Belgian Albums (Ultratop Wallonia)	18
Canadian Albums (Billboard)	10
Danish Albums (Hitlisten)	40
Dutch Albums (Album Top 100)	11
Finnish Albums (Suomen virallinen lista)	34
French Albums (SNEP)	16
German Albums (Offizielle Top 100)	6
Hungarian Albums (MAHASZ)	27
Irish Albums (IRMA)	27
Italian Albums (FIMI)	76
Japanese Albums (Oricon)	36
New Zealand Albums (RMNZ)	35
Polish Albums (ZPAV)	12
Portuguese Albums (AFP)	48
Scottish Albums (Official Charts)	2
Spanish Albums (Promusicae)	57
Swiss Albums (Schweizer Hitparade)	3
UK Albums (Official Charts)	3
UK Independent Albums (Official Charts)	2
US Billboard 200	4
US Independent Albums (Billboard)	2
US Top Alternative Albums (Billboard)	1
US Top Rock Albums (Billboard)	1
