= The Black Belles (album) =

Studio album by the Black Belles
- Released: 8 October 2011
- Recorded: 2010
- Studio: Third Man Studio
- Genre: Garage rock
- Label: Third Man
- Producer: Jack White

Singles from The Black Belles
- 1. "Honky Tonk Horror" Released: September 27, 2011; 2. "Wishing Well" Released: May 1, 2012

Professional ratings
Aggregate scores
Source	Rating
Metacritic	59/100
Review scores
Source	Rating
Consequence of Sound	B
PopMatters	4/10

The Black Belles is the debut studio album by American rock band the Black Belles, released on Third Man Records in 2011. The album spawned two singles, "Honky Tonk Horror" and "Wishing Well" (2012).

== History ==
The Black Belles was recorded and produced by Jack White over the course of a few months. Bassist Ruby Rogers said about the recording "We did it really fast, and then we recorded it really fast too".

== Editions ==
The Black Belles first edition is a 12-inch absinthe coloured vinyl album, the pressing limited to 300 copies in this color. There is also an unlimited black vinyl version as well as a CD version.

== Track listing ==
"Honky Tonk Horror" begins with a brief excerpt of "Ruby, Are You Mad At Your Man?" written by Cousin Emmy.

No.	Title	Writer(s)	Length
1.	"Leave You With A Letter"	Olivia Jean	2:21
2.	"In A Cage"	Jean; Ruby Rogers	2:14
3.	"Wishing Well"	Jean	2:58
4.	"Honky Tonk Horror"	Jean; Shelley Lynne; Lindsay Jane Hames	3:38
5.	"The Wrong Door"	Jean	2:57
6.	"Breathing Down My Neck"	Jean	2:52
7.	"The Tease"	Jean; Rogers	2:21
8.	"Howl At The Moon"	Jean	2:12
9.	"Pushing Up Daisies"	Jean	2:44
10.	"Not Tonight"	Jean	2:18
11.	"Hey Velda"	Jean	2:33

== Personnel ==
- Olivia Jean – songwriter, vocals, guitar, organ, design
- Ruby Rogers – songwriter (tracks: 2, 7), bass
- Shelley Lynne – songwriter (track 4), drums
- Christina "Lil' Boo" Norwood – synth
- Lindsay Jane Hames – songwriter (track 4)
- John Anthony Gillis – producer, mixing
- Vance Powell – recording, mixing
- Joshua V. Smith – assistant recording, assistant mixing
- David Swanson – photography
- Jo McCaughey – photography
- Toni O'Neal – photography
- Justin O'Neal – artwork, illustration, layout
- Matthew Jacobson – layout
