= Doctor Victor =

Czech rock band

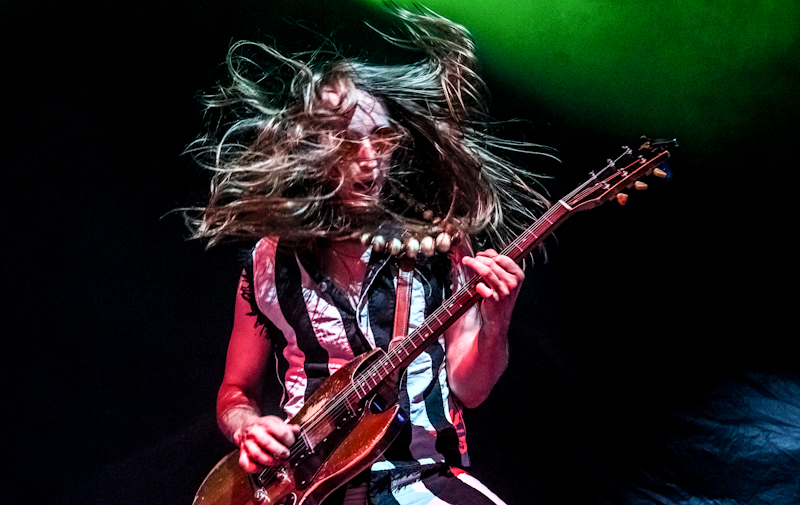
- Doctor Victor performing in 2022

Background information
- Origin: Prague, Czechia
- Genres: Rock and roll; blues rock; hard rock
- Years active: 2012–present
- Members: Victor; Pete; Tom
- Website: doctorvictor.com

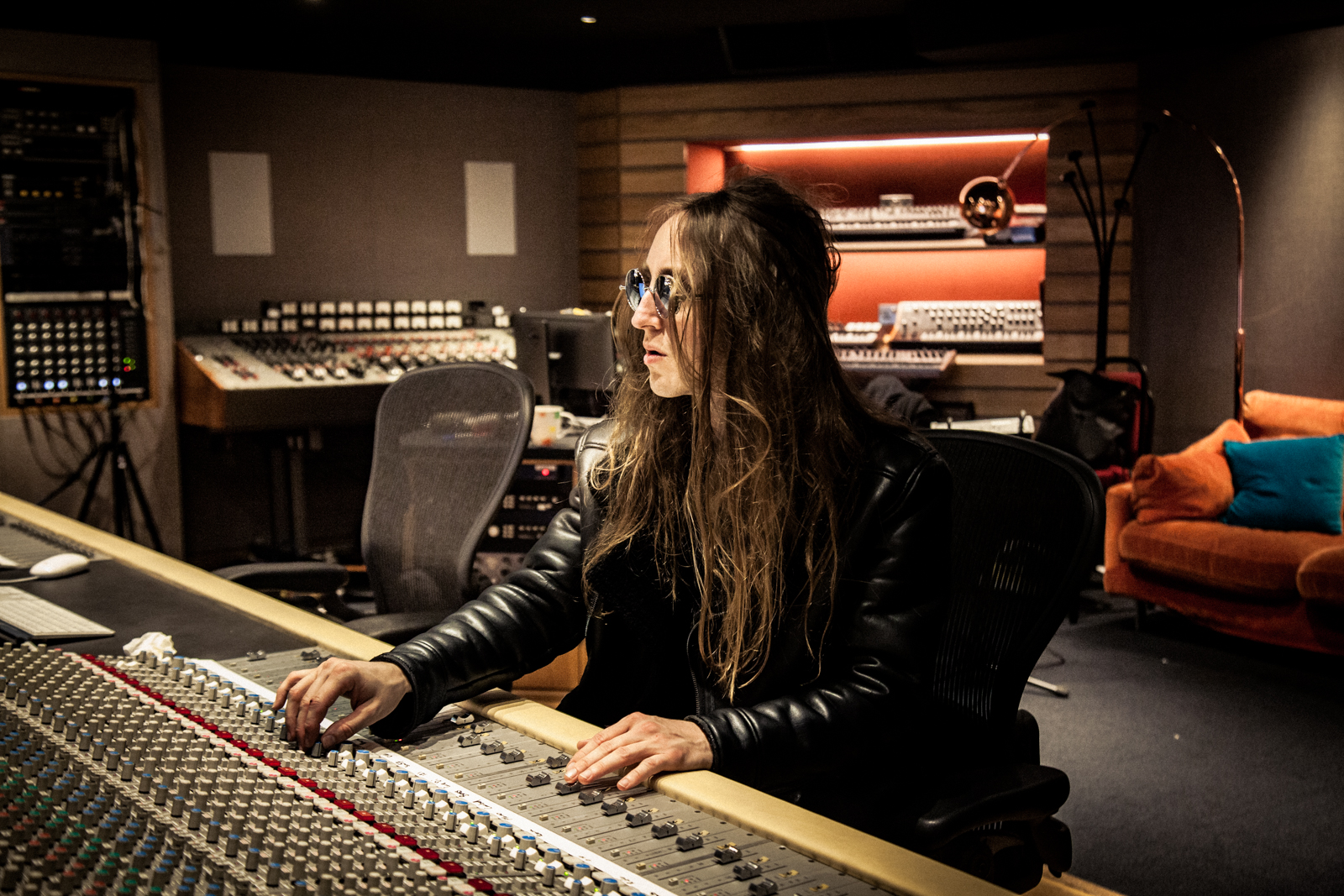
Doctor Victor during a recording sessions at Abbey Road Studios, London (2025)

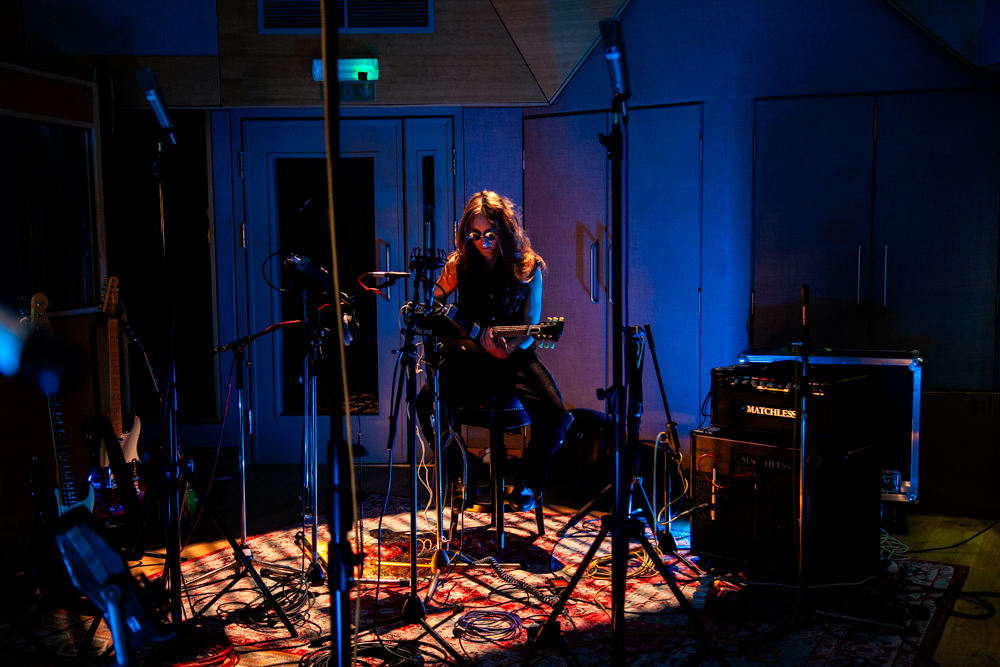
Doctor Victor at Abbey Road Studios during a recording session (2025)

Doctor Victor is a Czech rock trio formed in Prague in 2012. The band consists of Vojta "Victor" Bureš on vocals and lead guitar, Pete on bass, and Tom on drums. Their music draws on traditional rock from the late 1960s and early 1970s, with elements of blues. They are noted for their energetic live performances and a classic rock sound devoid of special effects. The band has gained international recognition through live performances across Europe and the United States and collaborations with internationally renowned musicians.

== History ==
=== Founding and early days: 2012–2015 ===
Doctor Victor was founded in 2012 by Vojta "Victor" Bureš, a graduate of the Jaroslav Ježek Conservatory in Prague and holder of a scholarship from the Berklee College of Music in Boston.

The band won the 2013 Hard Rock Rising contest in Czechia as well as the Czech Global Battle of the Bands in 2014. In the worldwide finals in Chiang Mai, Thailand, they placed second. In April 2014, they appeared on the cover of the Czech magazine Muzikus.

=== Debut album, touring, and Eurovision Song Contest: 2016–2018 ===
Doctor Victor released their debut album, 1st Prescription, in March 2016, on which Victor played all instruments. Two months later, the band was selected by AC/DC as the opening act for the Prague show of their Rock or Bust World Tour.

In 2017, Doctor Victor launched the Music Is My Drug Tour across Czechia and performed their first UK tour, playing six cities, including London. In October, they collaborated on the solo album Last Testament by singer Dan McCafferty of Nazareth, released in 2019, appearing on the track "My Baby".

In 2018, their single "StandUP" was included in the Czech national selection for the Eurovision Song Contest. The band toured across Europe and was selected among the semi-finalists of the KISS Kruise competition. The same year, they opened for the Dead Daisies in Prague.

=== 2019–present ===
In 2019, Doctor Victor toured the UK and the United States. Czech media reported that the band performed in Los Angeles clubs and appeared at the NAMM Show in California. The same year, Victor reached the finals of the John Lennon Songwriting Contest with the song "Can't Stop Rock'n'Roll".

In the early 2020s, Victor initiated the MusicBus project, a mobile music education initiative focused on workshops and live performances for children and young people across Czechia.

In 2021, Doctor Victor collaborated with internationally recognized musicians, performing live with bassist Ida Kristine Nielsen, known for her work with Prince, and announcing recording sessions with drummer Jonathan "Sugarfoot" Moffett, known for his long-term collaboration with Michael Jackson.

In 2025, Victor recorded the album 2nd Prescription at Abbey Road Studios in London, again playing all instruments himself.

== Band members ==
- Vojta "Victor" Bureš – vocals, lead guitar
- Pete – bass guitar, vocals
- Tom – drums, vocals

== Discography ==
- 1st Prescription (2016)
- 2nd Prescription (2025)
