= Entering Heaven Alive (album) =

Studio album by Jack White
- Released: July 22, 2022
- Recorded: 2021
- Studio: Third Man Studio (Nashville)
- Genre: Folk rock
- Length: 40:06
- Label: Third Man
- Producer: Jack White

Jack White chronology
Fear of the Dawn (2022)	Entering Heaven Alive (2022)	No Name (2024)

Singles from Entering Heaven Alive
- 1. "Taking Me Back (Gently)" Released: October 18, 2021; 2. "Love Is Selfish" Released: January 14, 2022; 3. "Queen of the Bees" Released: March 3, 2022; 4. "If I Die Tomorrow" Released: June 8, 2022

Entering Heaven Alive is the fifth studio album by the American rock musician Jack White, released on July 22, 2022, through Third Man Records.

== Recording ==
The album was recorded throughout 2021 at Third Man Studio in Nashville. Parts of "All Along the Way" were recorded at the George Nelson Kirkpatrick House in Kalamazoo, Michigan.

== Promotion and release ==
In October 2021, White released "Taking Me Back", his first solo single since 2018. An acoustic version, "Taking Me Back (Gently)", was released as the B-side. In November 2021, White revealed that he would release two solo albums in 2022: Fear of the Dawn, which featured White's traditional rock sound, and Entering Heaven Alive, a folk album.

In December 2021, White announced the Supply Chain Issues Tour kicking off on April 8, 2022, in Detroit, Michigan. The tour covers North America and Europe. On January 14, 2022, White released lead single "Love Is Selfish" and an accompanying music video. On February 11, 2022, White released the "Love Is Selfish" single with the Fear of the Dawn title track as its B-side. On March 3, 2022, White released the song "Hi-De-Ho" (which features rapper Q-Tip, formerly of hip hop group A Tribe Called Quest) as the second standalone single from Fear of the Dawn; the single included the B-side "Queen of the Bees". Finally on June 8, 2022, White released the song "If I Die Tomorrow" with an accompanying video.

Entering Heaven Alive was released by Third Man Records on July 22, 2022.

== Critical reception ==
Professional ratings
Aggregate scores
Source	Rating
AnyDecentMusic?	7.3/10
Metacritic	79/100
Review scores
Source	Rating
AllMusic	4.5/5 stars
American Songwriter	3.5/5 stars
The Daily Telegraph	4/5 stars
Mojo	4/5 stars
NME	4/5 stars
Paste	5.7/10
Pitchfork	6.4/10
Rolling Stone	3.5/5 stars
The Times	4/5 stars
Uncut	7/10

According to the review aggregator Metacritic, Entering Heaven Alive received "generally favorable reviews" based on a weighted average score of 79 out of 100 from 19 critic scores. Stephen Thomas Erlewine of AllMusic wrote: "Entering Heaven Alive feels of a piece with White's previous work, yet the ideas are synthesized and executed in fresh, inventive ways, suggesting that the ungainly Boarding House Reach was indeed a transitionary album to allow him to do music that's as relaxed and vibrant as this."

== Track listing ==
All tracks are written by Jack White.

Entering Heaven Alive track listing
No.	Title	Length
1.	"A Tip from You to Me"	2:42
2.	"All Along the Way"	3:52
3.	"Help Me Along"	4:46
4.	"Love Is Selfish"	2:52
5.	"I've Got You Surrounded (With My Love)"	4:24
6.	"Queen of the Bees"	2:30
7.	"A Tree on Fire from Within"	2:59
8.	"If I Die Tomorrow"	2:59
9.	"Please God, Don't Tell Anyone"	4:00
10.	"A Madman from Manhattan"	4:26
11.	"Taking Me Back (Gently)"	4:36
Total length:		40:06

== Personnel ==
Primary artist

- Jack White – vocals (all tracks), acoustic guitar (1–4, 8–11), percussion (1, 2, 6, 7), drums (2, 7, 8, 10), electric guitar (tracks 2, 5, 8), bass guitar (tracks 2, 4, 7, 8), ukulele bass (track 2), Hammond organ (track 2), vibraphone (track 3), Wurlitzer piano (track 3), additional percussion (tracks 3, 5), Chamberlin drum machine (track 5), Mellotron M4000D (track 6), Hammond Solovox (track 6), piano (track 7), analog Mellotron (track 8), Septavox synthesizer (track 8)

Session musicians

- Ben Swank – drums (tracks 1, 9)
- Dominic Davis – bass guitar (tracks 1, 5, 9), upright bass (tracks 6, 11)
- Mark Watrous – piano (track 1), additional keys (track 3), Wurlitzer piano (track 9)
- Olivia Jean – Tic-Tac bass guitar (track 2), electric guitar (track 2), live percussion (track 3), shakers (track 11)
- Patrick Keeler – drums (3, 6, 11)
- Fats Kaplin – violin (tracks 3, 11), viola (track 3), strings (track 3)
- Dean Fertita – Wurlitzer piano solo (track 3)
- Cory Younts – live piano (track 3), piano (track 11)
- Quincy McCrary – piano (tracks 3, 5, 9, 10)
- Pokey LaFarge – acoustic guitar (tracks 3, 11)
- Daru Jones – drums (track 5)
- Dan Mancini – acoustic guitar (track 6)
- Jack Lawrence – bass guitar (track 10)

Technical personnel

- Jack White – production (all tracks), engineering (tracks 2, 5), mixing (all tracks)
- Joshua V. Smith – engineering (tracks 1–3, 5–7, 9–11), mixing (tracks 1–3, 5–7, 9–11)
- Bill Skibbe – engineering (tracks 1–5, 7–10), mixing (tracks 1–5, 8–11), mastering (all tracks)

Packaging

- The Third Man – packaging design
- Rob Jones at Animal Rummy – packaging design
- Sara Deck – photo restoration and touch-up
- Nikolai Matorin – front cover photograph (Rhythm of Labor, 1960)
- Ed Westcott – back cover and inner sleeve photographs (Civil Defense air raid drill, Highland View School, 1953)

== Charts ==
Chart performance for Entering Heaven Alive
Chart (2022)	Peak position
Australian Albums (ARIA)	43
Austrian Albums (Ö3 Austria)	4
Belgian Albums (Ultratop Flanders)	12
Belgian Albums (Ultratop Wallonia)	34
Canadian Albums (Billboard)	45
Dutch Albums (Album Top 100)	9
German Albums (Offizielle Top 100)	4
Polish Albums (ZPAV)	23
Scottish Albums (Official Charts)	3
Spanish Albums (Promusicae)	65
Swiss Albums (Schweizer Hitparade)	3
UK Albums (Official Charts)	4
UK Independent Albums (Official Charts)	1
US Billboard 200	9
US Independent Albums (Billboard)	2
US Top Alternative Albums (Billboard)	1
US Top Rock Albums (Billboard)	1
