= The Sextones =

American band

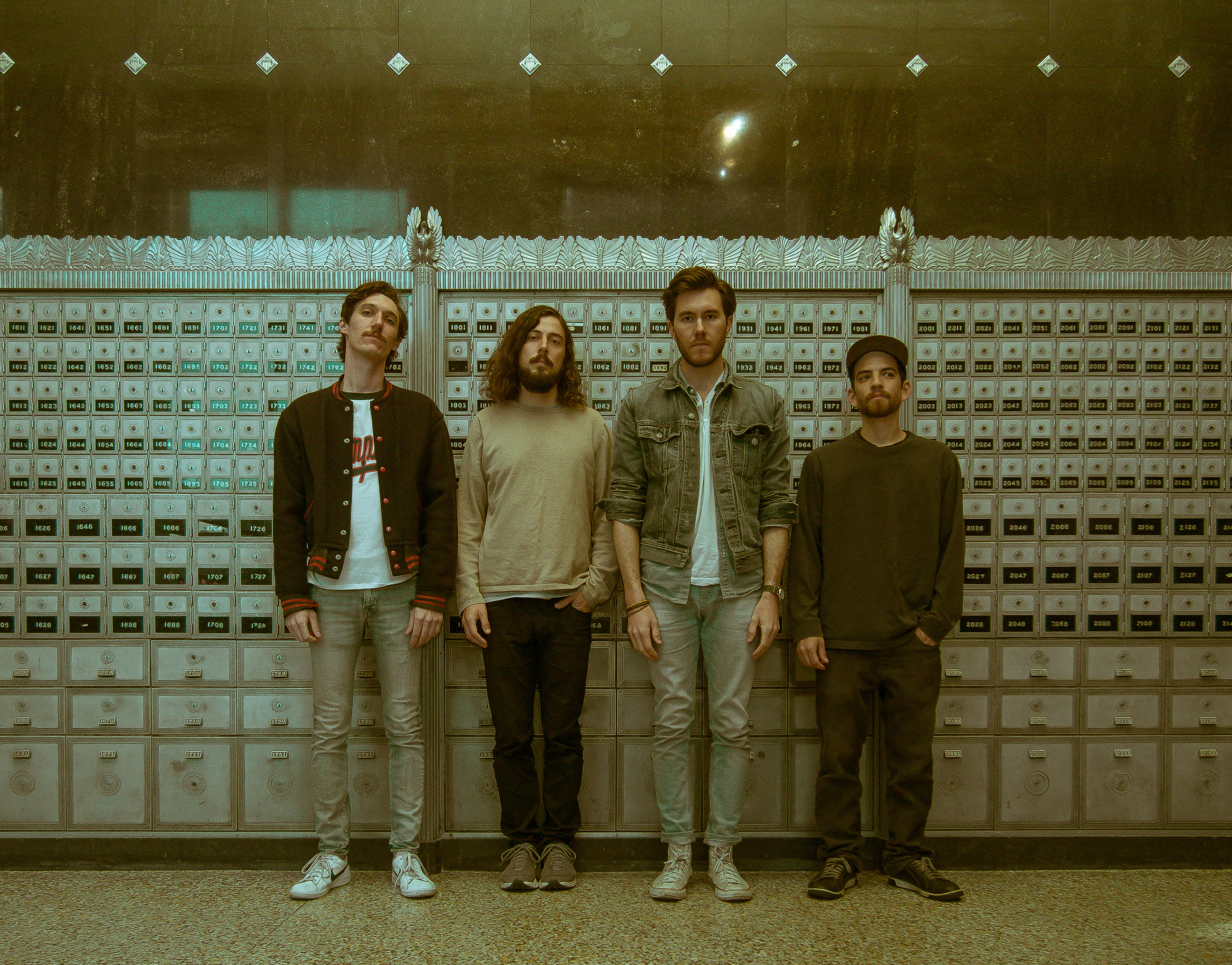
- The Sextones

Background information
- Origin: Reno, Nevada, United States
- Genres: Soul, Rock, Funk
- Years active: 2007–present
- Labels: Sextone Records, Record Kicks, P-Vine Records
- Members: Mark Sexton; Alexander Korostinsky; Daniel Weiss; Chris Sexton
- Website: www.thesextonesmusic.com

The Sextones is a soul and funk band originated in Reno, Nevada in 2007. Its members are Mark Sexton, Alexander Korostinsky, Daniel Weiss, and Chris Sexton.

== History ==
=== Early years ===
The Sextones was formed in the summer 2007, originally titled Mark Sexton Band. The members knew each other since grade school but began playing music together once they all attended Reno High School.

Their first official album Multiformity was released in 2008. Their second album Listen Out came out in 2010. It was recorded at Jason McGerr's (Death Cab for Cutie) studio, Two Sticks Audio in Seattle, WA.

Mark Sexton Band’s final album was recorded in the summer of 2012 in Burbank, CA within one day. They released the EP Young & Naive in the spring of 2013 after having Alan Evans (Soulive) mix the album. The album was recorded in Los Angeles by Emmy Award winning engineer Larold Rebhun.

In 2014, Ryan Taylor joined the group as their keyboardist. In 2017, Mark's younger brother Chris Sexton joined the band as their keyboardist.

=== The Sextones ===
The band changed its name to The Sextones in the late 2015. Between 2013 and 2017 the band played new songs on tour that would end up on The Sextones debut album Moonlight Vision in 2017. The band has performed at Sundance Film Festival (2015–2017), Wanderlust Squaw Valley (2014), Railroad Earth's Hangtown Halloween Ball (2012 & 2014), For The Funk Of It (2014), Brews Jazz & Funk Fest (2014), Squaw Valley Brews, Jazz & Funk Festival (2013–2015).

=== Moonlight Vision ===
In the summer of 2015, the band recorded its debut album at Prairie Sun Studios in Cotati, CA live on 2-inch analog tape. The four members collaborated with both Eric Johnson (tenor saxophone) and Ben Caiazza (trumpet, flugelhorn) for this recording session. Mark and Alexander then spent over a year and a half mixing and producing the album in Reno, NV. Additional overdubs were recorded at both Red House Studios and Butter City Studios in Reno, NV with the help of David Squelch. The album was mastered by Grammy Award winning engineer Jared Hirshland.

During the spring of 2017, The Sextones announced the Sextone Hotline campaign that made The Sextones' new album available for preview via a call-in hotline number. The campaign generated internet interest and was written about in entertainment blogs such as AXS Entertainment.

In April 2017, The Sextones officially released their debut album, Moonlight Vision on Sextone Records. Okayplayer called the album "…a Herculean work ethic, mixed with a Sherlock Holmes-esque attention to detail and a nuance that can be appreciated by true music lovers."

Working on the album, the band toured the US and shared the stage with Macy Gray, Ziggy Marley, Ivan Neville’s Dumpstaphunk and renowned funkologist Alan Evans. The band has also collaborated with JJ Grey & Mofro, Galactic, Toubab Krewe, George Porter Jr, The Wailers, Ozomatli, Robert Walters, Charles Bradley, Steel Pulse, English Beat, The Stone Foxes, The London Souls.

The Sextones began a national tour in support of Moonlight Vision, and recorded an exclusive Daytrotter Session in Davenport, IA during the tour. During the release of their album, the band signed a record deal with P-Vine Records out of Tokyo, Japan. A Japanese edition of the album is expected to be released overseas.

=== Love Can't Be Borrowed ===
The band's second studio album, Love Can't Be Borrowed, was released on September 29, 2023 by Record Kicks. Produced by Kelly Finnigan of Monophonics and recorded entirely on analog equipment at Transistor Sound Studios in San Rafael, California, the record pays homage to the soul tradition of the late 1960s and early 1970s. Across ten tracks, including Daydreaming, This Could Last Forever and the title track, the album highlights Mark Sexton's falsetto vocals, Alexander Korostinsky's bass grooves and a sound marked by wah-wah guitars, horn arrangements and detailed production. Critics noted how the group revived the legacy of classic soul with authenticity and a contemporary touch: KEXP described the record as a “time capsule” that transports listeners back to the golden era of American soul, enriched by warm, uncompromising production.

== Band members ==
- Mark Sexton – guitar/vocals (2007–present)
- Alexander Korostinsky – bass/synth bass (2007–present)
- Daniel Weiss – drums/percussion (2007–present)
- Chris Sexton - piano/organ (2017–present)

== Auxiliary members ==
- Eric Johnson – saxophone (2015–present)
- Ben Caiazza – trumpet/flugelhorn (2015–present)

== Former members ==
- Damian Hirai – saxophone (2007–2008)
- Ryan Parrish – saxophone (2008–2010)
- James Hoover – saxophone (2010–2012)
- Jay Cowell – keyboards (2010–2012)
- Davis Corl – trombone (2014–2015)
- Dominico Lacala – trumpet (2014–2015)
- Ryan Taylor - keyboards (2014-2017)

== Discography ==
- Multiformity (2008)
- Listen Out (2010)
- Moonlight Vision (2017)
- Love Can't Be Borrowed (2023)
