= Olivia Jean =

American musician (born 1990)

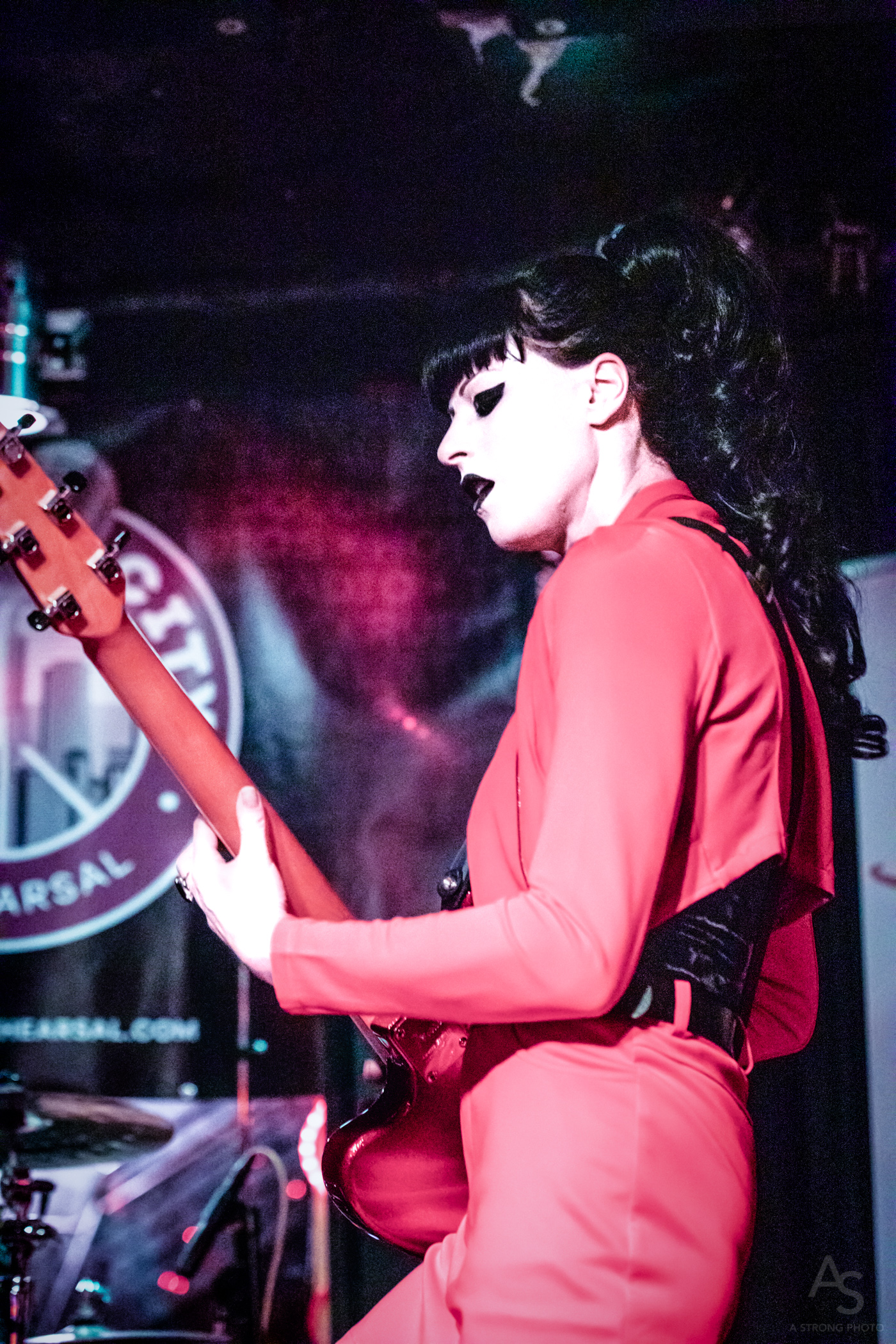
- Jean performing in 2020

Background information
- Born: Olivia Jean Markel; February 23, 1990 (age 36)
- Origin: Nashville, Tennessee, U.S.
- Genres: Gothic rock; garage rock; surf rock
- Occupations: Singer; songwriter; musician
- Instruments: Vocals; guitar; bass guitar
- Years active: 2009–present
- Label: Third Man
- Spouse: Jack White (m. 2022)

Olivia Jean Markel (born February 23, 1990) is an American singer, songwriter, and musician. She signed with Third Man Records in 2009, forming the all-female gothic rock band the Black Belles as lead vocalist and guitarist. Following their disbandment in 2012, Jean embarked on a solo career releasing three studio albums. She is also a session musician, collaborating with artists including Karen Elson, Wanda Jackson, and her husband Jack White.

== Early life and education ==
Olivia Jean Markel was born on February 23, 1990, and was raised in St. Clair Shores, Michigan, a suburb of Detroit. Her parents encouraged their four children to be creative. For her seventh birthday, Jean got her first guitar and started teaching herself to play. Shortly after that, as an Elmwood Elementary second grader, she formed her first band called Broken Glass.

On April 16, 2003, when she was 13, her mother took her to Detroit's Masonic Temple for her first concert to see the White Stripes. That same year, she created a fan webpage dedicated to the White Stripes called Olivia's Peppermint Palace.

As a 14-year-old freshman, along with her friend, Stephany, on bass and her younger brother Brent on drums, Jean formed the Yazuka Drag Queens. Playing original songs, they won their school's talent show and went on to open at a gig for a local band, Genders.

By high school, Jean was a self-taught multi-instrumentalist and songwriter who spent her free time recording her own surf music using a computer microphone and layering the individual instrument recordings on top of each other using a free music editing program. At 16, she began playing small clubs around Detroit and handing out her homemade demo CDs to friends, family, and co-workers. “It was a hobby,” she stated to The New York Times in 2022. “I didn’t know you could make money off of music.”

As part of an elective course at South Lake High School, she enrolled in cosmetology classes. Speaking to Vogue in 2023 about her signature bouffant hairstyle, "When I was 16, I went to cosmetology school—it was one through my school, so it was not very high-end—and our textbooks were from the ’70s, so we were learning all the hairstyles from the ’60s. All of us in my cosmetology school had giant bouffants, and it just became a part of me."

In 2006, she took part in the Michigan Interscholastic Press Association (MIPA) Spring Conference On-Site Contest and won 3rd place for her featured writing entry. In June 2008, she participated in the Detroit Festival of the Arts and replicated the Andy Warhol painting, Red Jackie, using chalk. In 2009, she enrolled in graphic design school and continued making surf inspired instrumental demos and performing under the name, Idee Fixe.

== Career ==
=== Discovery and collaborations with Third Man Records ===
At 19 years old in 2009, after hearing that Jack White's supergroup, the Dead Weather, was going to be playing a show in Detroit, Jean headed to the venue and laid a path of her demos from the band's tour bus to the side door they used to enter the venue. A couple of weeks later, after listening to the demo, Jack White called her and invited her to his Nashville studio, Third Man Records, to record her songs with him. Jean would stay in Nashville to work on Third Man projects and then go home to Detroit during her down time. She moved to Nashville permanently in 2011. Jean appears in the Dead Weather's 2009 music video for "I Cut Like a Buffalo".

She played bass on two tracks for the 2010 album The Ghost Who Walks, the debut from Jack White's then-wife, Karen Elson, and appears in the title track's music video. She continued to play bass as part of Elson's live band while she was promoting the album, including a performance on The Late Show with David Letterman in September 2010.

She played several instruments on various tracks for Wanda Jackson's 2010 Jack White produced album, The Party Ain't Over. She also appears in the music video for a song from the album, "Thunder on the Mountain". She continued to play guitar as part of Jackson's live band while promoting the album which included a performance on The Late Show with David Letterman and a show at the Grand Ole Opry both in January 2011.

Jean contributed to the recordings of several instruments and backing vocals for various tracks for several of Jack White's solo albums including Blunderbuss (2012), Lazaretto (2014), Entering Heaven Alive (2022), Fear of the Dawn (2022), and No Name. Jean appeared in White's 2012 music video for "I'm Shakin'" as well as played guitar and sang backing vocals for a live performance of the song on Conan in December 2012. Jean also appeared in White's 2022 music video for "If I Die Tomorrow."

=== The Black Belles ===
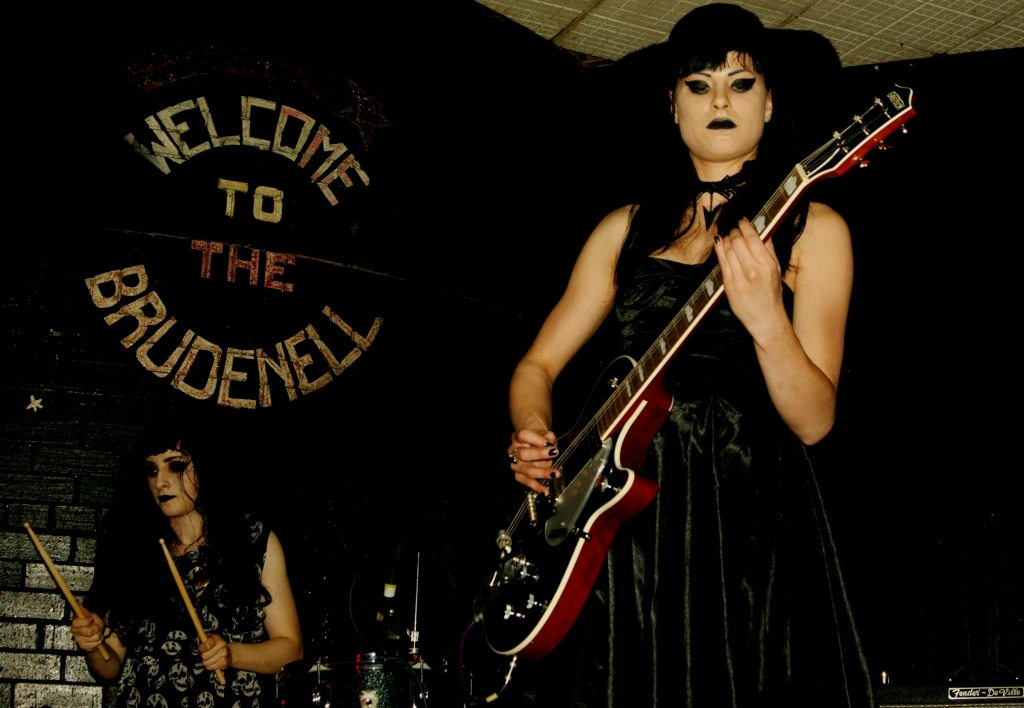
Jean performing with the Black Belles in 2012

After Jean became part of the Third Man Records family in 2009, Jack White introduced her to various musicians to potentially become her band. "I had a recording that I gave to Jack, and it was mostly instrumental music, but it was a jumping-off point for like, some project to begin. I did it for myself, but I didn’t play anything live, because I didn’t have a band." Jean met Shelby Lynne, Ruby Rogers, and Erin Belle when they all appeared in the Dead Weather's 2009 music video for "I Cut Like A Buffalo". The women would go on to form the Black Belles, and the songs Jean wrote and recorded for her demo became the material for the band.

Jack White produced the Black Belles' first single, "What Can I Do?" which was written by Jean and released on January 26, 2010. White also directed the single's music video which premiered on February 17, 2010. Later that year, White arranged for "What Can I Do?" to be used as the theme song for Elvira's Movie Macabre, a revamping of the 1980s classic horror movie showcase hosted by Elvira, Mistress of the Dark, which ran from 2010 to 2012.

In June 2011, Jack White produced the song "Charlene II (I'm Over You)", a collaboration between the Black Belles and comedian and television show host Stephen Colbert. The song is a sequel to Colbert's 2006 faux-eighties comedy tune "Charlene (I'm Right Behind You)". With White introducing them, the Black Belles performed the song with Colbert on The Colbert Report. With Jack White as producer and Jean as the main songwriter, the Black Belles' self-titled debut album, The Black Belles, was released on November 11, 2011. The band went on tour from November 2011 to June 2012, hitting clubs and festivals in the U.S., Canada, and the U.K.

The Black Belles disbanded in 2012, with Jean citing struggles on the road and nerves behind the break-up. "Because the road can do some crazy things to a girl band. That was the first band a lot of us actually full-on toured with. So we were just getting used to things. So new to everything that we were all kind of tense and didn't know what was going on. ... So we were very vulnerable and, you know, nervous. So we would take our nerves out on each other."

=== Solo career ===
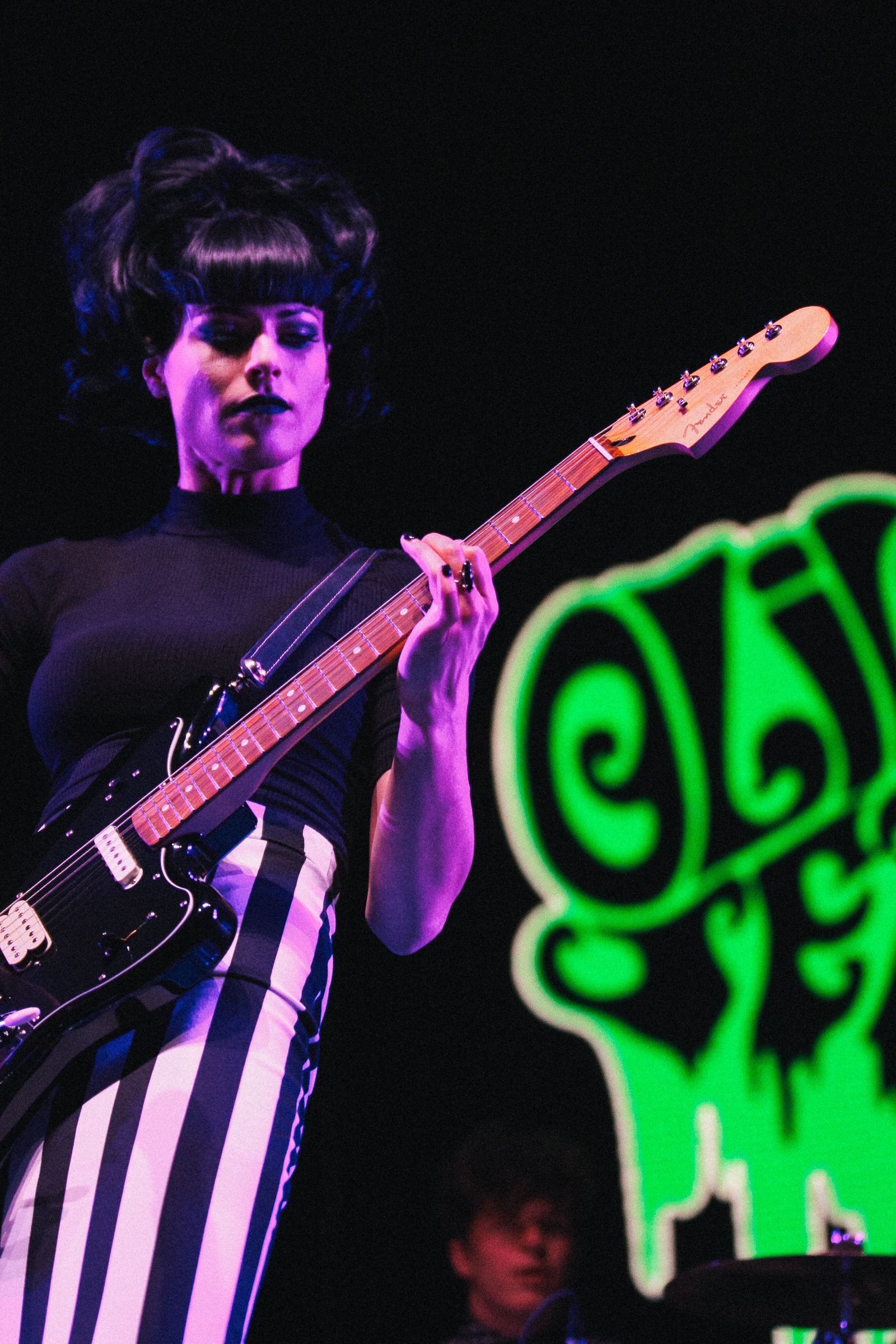
Jean performing in 2018

After the Black Belles disbanded in 2012, Jean took about a year off before going back into the studio. Using previously recorded music that didn't quite fit for the Black Belles, she had enough material for a solo album. Bathtub Love Killings was released on October 14, 2014. The title was inspired by a serial killer from the 1800's who killed three women in a bathtub. While Jack White produced the album, Jean wrote all of the songs and played almost every instrument herself. The first single, "Reminisce", debuted on September 15, 2014. Jean performed her second single, "Merry Widow," on Conan on November 10, 2014. Jean supported the album with a series of free in-store performances at record stores and clubs with a backing band consisting of drummer Jacob Edwards, musician Brett Mielke, Nashville session player Micah Hulsche, and bassist Taylor Zachry.

Jean's second solo album, Night Owl, was released on August 30, 2019. The title comes from Jean's tendency to be an insomniac and the fact that her creativity tends to be amped up at night. In stark contrast to Bathtub Love Killings, Jean took on the task of producing Night Owl herself, calling on the players she wanted for each part. The album's first single and title track, "Night Owl", was released on July 29, 2019, with an accompanying music video. Jean included a cover of Mohammed Rafi's Bollywood dance number, "Jaan Pehechan Ho", on the album. Jean would go on to support the Raconteurs during the August and September dates of their 2019 world tour. She promoted her album with her own small tours and in-store performances with various musicians that included bassists Jessica Wilkes and Erica Salazar, drummers Simon Knudtson, Dave Martin and Sam Skorik, and guitarists Blake Talley and Cody Clayton.

Jean collaborated with singer-songwriter April March for a 6 track extended play (EP) encompassing a multi-lingual, multi-arrangement study on the track "Palladium" by Liz Brady (originally written as "The Hip" by 60's Texan rockers the Sparkles). The pair recorded three renditions each of the same tune for the EP, with March singing ‘Allons-y’ in French and Jean singing “Let’s Go” in English. Each track is presented in a different musical style (with Olivia Jean taking the English versions and April March taking the French) for a total of six tracks. Recorded in July 2020, March and Jean's self-produced collaboration also features the talents of Erica Salazar on bass, Austin Seegers on drums, and Cody Clayton on guitar. The EP was released on March 5, 2021 through Third Man Records with an accompanying video released on March 22, 2021.

Jean's third solo album, Raving Ghost, was released on May 5, 2023. She was once again in the producer's chair for the album with Jack White credited as co-producer. Recorded at Los Angeles's Valentine Recording Studios and Third Man Recording Studios in Nashville, Raving Ghost counts collaborators like keyboardist Bo Koster, Roger Joseph Manning Jr, as well as drummers Carla Azar and Patrick Keeler, with engineering by Bill Skibbe. The first single, "Trouble," was released on March 1, 2023, with the music video following on March 10, 2023. The title track, "Raving Ghost," was released on April 6, 2023. Jean also included a cover of Enya's 1988 hit, "Orinoco Flow" on the album. After heavy promotion from Third Man Records, Jean toured in May and June 2023 with a new backing band which included drummer Marcus Powell, bassist Erica Salazar, and guitarist Marco Argiro.

== Personal life ==
Jean suffers from social anxiety, which impacts her relationship with performing. "I'm still kind of getting the hang of [performing] even though I've been doing it for a long time", she reflected in a 2014 interview with Elle. "I'm very shy so it's difficult for me to perform. But I really enjoy doing it. Having social anxiety makes it a lot different than for the majority of musicians out there. So every show is an accomplishment". Jean stated to Northern Transmissions in July 2019, “I am introverted and obsessed with art. I live every day with a lot of anxiety, guilt, doubt, and depression. I get completely obsessed with projects or completely imprisoned by fear of judgment.”

Jean has been the subject of online criticism with people often questioning her authenticity, talent and relationship with Jack White. It took a toll on Jean, causing the artist to lash out at naysayers publicly on her social media; this was something she regretted doing. “When you work so hard it’s absolutely heartbreaking and uninspiring. I was like, 'if people aren’t even going to listen to the music, and insult me before listening to it, why am I pouring my soul into something?’ I was bummed out for a long time.”

=== Relationships ===
Jean's relationship with Jack White has been speculated about ever since she began working with him in 2009. She revealed in an interview with The New York Times that she began dating White in 2014. “We were just really good friends,” she said. “You have to know that you can be friends for a while before you can date. It wasn’t really a transition. It was more, OK, this is happening. More like a continuation.” Public confirmation of the relationship with White first occurred in August 2021 when White posted about her on the Third Man Upholstery Instagram page calling her his "wonderful girlfriend and enchanting muse of many years."

On April 8, 2022, White kicked off his Supply Chain Issues tour at the Masonic Temple in Detroit, Michigan with Jean as the opener. White brought Jean out on stage to sing the White Stripes' song, "Hotel Yorba". Right before the line, "Let's get married/In a big cathedral by a priest", White asked Markel to marry him. They got married immediately on stage with fellow Third Man Records co-founder, Ben Swank officiating along with White's mother, Teresa Gillis and her father, Brent Markel by their sides.

They reside in Nashville. During the COVID-19 pandemic, she converted the pool house into her own recording studio.

In June 2026, Jean filed for divorce from White, citing "inappropriate marital conduct" and irreconcilable differences.

== Discography ==
Solo

- Bathtub Love Killings (2014)
- Night Owl (2019)
- Raving Ghost (2023)

With the Black Belles

- The Black Belles (2011)
