= The Hi De Ho Man =

Single by Cab Calloway

"The Hi De Ho Man" (or "The Hi-De-Ho Man (That's Me)") is a 1947 song by Cab Calloway. The phrase and chorus, Hi-De-Hi-Hi-De-Ho, has also been heard in the 1931 song "Minnie the Moocher" and the singer used it in several films.

In late 2017, the intro of the song was sampled for "Icon", from American rapper Jaden Smith's album Syre.

The title of the song, that frequently served as a nickname for the singer, was given to various Calloway compilations, including one in 1974 and one in 2024, which both include the 1934 song.
