= List of songs recorded by the White Stripes =

The White Stripes were an American rock band from Detroit, Michigan. The following is a complete list of songs recorded by the band.

== Album songs ==
All songs that appear on albums by the White Stripes. (87 songs)

Song	Writer(s)	Album	Year	Ref(s).
"300 M.P.H. Torrential Outpour Blues"	Jack White; Meg White	Icky Thump	2007	
"A Boy's Best Friend"	Jack White; Meg White	De Stijl	2000	
"Aluminum"	Jack White; Meg White	White Blood Cells	2001	
"A Martyr For My Love For You"	Jack White; Meg White	Icky Thump	2007	
"The Air Near My Fingers"	Jack White; Meg White	Elephant	2003	
"Apple Blossom"	Jack White; Meg White	De Stijl	2000	
"Astro"	Jack White; Meg White	The White Stripes	1999	
"As Ugly As I Seem"	Jack White; Meg White	Get Behind Me Satan	2005	
"Ball and Biscuit"	Jack White; Meg White	Elephant	2003	
"The Big Three Killed My Baby"	Jack White; Meg White	The White Stripes	1999	
"Black Math"	Jack White; Meg White	Elephant	2003	
"Blue Orchid"	Jack White; Meg White	Get Behind Me Satan	2005	
"Bone Broke"	Jack White; Meg White	Icky Thump	2007	
"Broken Bricks"	Jack White; Meg White; Stephen Gillis	The White Stripes	1999	
"Cannon"	Jack White; Meg White	The White Stripes	1999	
"Catch Hell Blues"	Jack White; Meg White	Icky Thump	2007	
"Conquest"	Corky Robbins	Icky Thump	2007	
"Dead Leaves and the Dirty Ground"	Jack White; Meg White	White Blood Cells	2001	
"Death Letter"	Eddie James "Son" House	De Stijl	2000	
"The Denial Twist"	Jack White; Meg White	Get Behind Me Satan	2005	
"Do"	Jack White; Meg White	The White Stripes	1999	
"Effect & Cause"	Jack White; Meg White	Icky Thump	2007	
"Expecting"	Jack White; Meg White	White Blood Cells	2001	
"Fell in Love with a Girl"	Jack White; Meg White	White Blood Cells	2001	
"Forever For Her (Is Over For Me)"	Jack White; Meg White	Get Behind Me Satan	2005	
"Girl, You Have No Faith In Medicine"	Jack White; Meg White	Elephant	2003	
"The Hardest Button to Button"	Jack White; Meg White	Elephant	2003	
"Hello Operator"	Jack White; Meg White	De Stijl	2000	
"Hotel Yorba"	Jack White; Meg White	White Blood Cells	2001	
"Hypnotize"	Jack White; Meg White	Elephant	2003	
"I Can Learn"	Jack White; Meg White	White Blood Cells	2001	
"I Can't Wait"	Jack White; Meg White	White Blood Cells	2001	
"Icky Thump"	Jack White; Meg White	Icky Thump	2007	
"I Fought Piranhas"	Jack White; Meg White	The White Stripes	1999	
"I Just Don't Know What to Do with Myself"	Burt Bacharach; Hal David	Elephant	2003	
"I Think I Smell a Rat"	Jack White; Meg White	White Blood Cells	2001	
"I Want to Be the Boy to Warm Your Mother's Heart"	Jack White; Meg White	Elephant	2003	
"I'm Bound to Pack it Up"	Jack White; Meg White	De Stijl	2000	
"I'm Finding It Harder to Be a Gentleman"	Jack White; Meg White	White Blood Cells	2001	
"I'm Lonely (But I Ain't That Lonely Yet)"	Jack White; Meg White	Get Behind Me Satan	2005	
"I'm Slowly Turning Into You"	Jack White; Meg White	Icky Thump	2007	
"Instinct Blues"	Jack White; Meg White	Get Behind Me Satan	2005	
"In the Cold, Cold Night"	Jack White; Meg White	Elephant	2003	
"It's True That We Love One Another"	Jack White; Meg White	Elephant	2003	
"Jimmy the Exploder"	Jack White; Meg White	The White Stripes	1999	
"Jumble, Jumble"	Jack White; Meg White	De Stijl	2000	
"Let's Build a Home"	Jack White; Meg White	De Stijl	2000	
"Little Acorns"	Jack White; Mort Crim	Elephant	2003	
"Little Bird"	Jack White; Meg White	De Stijl	2000	
"Little Cream Soda"	Jack White; Meg White	Icky Thump	2007	
"Little Ghost"	Jack White; Meg White	Get Behind Me Satan	2005	
"Little People"	Jack White; Meg White	The White Stripes	1999	
"Little Room"	Jack White; Meg White	White Blood Cells	2001	
"My Doorbell"	Jack White; Meg White	Get Behind Me Satan	2005	
"Now Mary"	Jack White; Meg White	White Blood Cells	2001	
"The Nurse"	Jack White; Meg White	Get Behind Me Satan	2005	
"Offend In Every Way"	Jack White; Meg White	White Blood Cells	2001	
"One More Cup of Coffee"	Bob Dylan	The White Stripes	1999	
"Passive Manipulation"	Jack White; Meg White	Get Behind Me Satan	2005	
"Prickly Thorn, But Sweetly Worn"	Jack White; Meg White	Icky Thump	2007	
"Rag and Bone"	Jack White; Meg White	Icky Thump	2007	
"Red Rain"	Jack White; Meg White	Get Behind Me Satan	2005	
"The Same Boy You've Always Known"	Jack White; Meg White	White Blood Cells	2001	
"St. Andrew (The Battle Is In the Air)"	Jack White; Meg White	Icky Thump	2007	
"St. James Infirmary Blues"	Traditional	The White Stripes	1999	
"Screwdriver"	Jack White; Meg White	The White Stripes	1999	
"Seven Nation Army"	Jack White; Meg White	Elephant	2003	
"Shelter of Your Arms"	Jack White; Meg White	Walking with a Ghost	2005	
"Sister, Do You Know My Name?"	Jack White; Meg White	De Stijl	2000	
"Slicker Drips"	Jack White; Meg White	The White Stripes	1999	
"Stop Breaking Down"	Robert Johnson	The White Stripes	1999	
"Sugar Never Tasted So Good"	Jack White; Meg White	The White Stripes	1999	
"Suzy Lee"	Jack White; Meg White	The White Stripes	1999	
"Take, Take, Take"	Jack White; Meg White	Get Behind Me Satan	2005	
"There's No Home For You Here"	Jack White; Meg White	Elephant	2003	
"This Protector"	Jack White; Meg White	White Blood Cells	2001	
"Truth Doesn't Make a Noise"	Jack White; Meg White	De Stijl	2000	
"The Union Forever"	Jack White; Meg White	White Blood Cells	2001	
"Walking with a Ghost"	Sara Quin	Walking with a Ghost	2005	
"Wasting My Time"	Jack White; Meg White	The White Stripes	1999	
"We're Going to Be Friends"	Jack White; Meg White	White Blood Cells	2001	
"When I Hear My Name"	Jack White; Meg White	The White Stripes	1999	
"White Moon"	Jack White; Meg White	Get Behind Me Satan	2005	
"Why Can't You Be Nicer to Me?"	Jack White; Meg White	De Stijl	2000	
"You Don't Know What Love Is (You Just Do as You're Told)"	Jack White; Meg White	Icky Thump	2007	
"Your Southern Can Is Mine"	William Samuel "Blind Willie" McTell	De Stijl	2000	
"You're Pretty Good Looking (For a Girl)"	Jack White; Meg White	De Stijl	2000	
"You've Got Her In Your Pocket"	Jack White; Meg White	Elephant	2003	

== Bonus tracks ==
Songs that do not appear on the studio albums. Includes both non-album singles and B-Sides.

Song	Releases	Intended Release
"Ashtray Heart"	B-side of "Party of Special Things to Do"	Non-album single
"Baby Brother"	B-side of "Icky Thump"	Icky Thump
"Black Jack Davey"	B-side of "Seven Nation Army"	Elephant
"Cash Grab Complications for the Matter"	B-side of "Conquest"	Icky Thump
"Candy Cane Children"	Single	Non-album single
"China Pig"	B-side of "Party of Special Things to Do"	Non-album single
"Good to Me"	B-side of "Seven Nation Army"	Elephant
"Hand Springs"	Single	Non-album single
"Honey, We Can't Afford to Look This Cheap"	B-side of "Conquest"	Icky Thump
"It's My Fault For Being Famous"	B-side of "Conquest"	Icky Thump
"Jolene"	Single/B-Side of "Hello Operator"	De Stijl; Under Blackpool Lights
"Lafayette Blues"	Single	Non-album single
"Let's Shake Hands"	Single	Non-album single
"Look Me Over Closely"	B-side of "Let's Shake Hands"	Non-album single
"Lord, Send Me an Angel"	Single	Non-album single
"Party of Special Things to Do"	Single	Non-album single
"Reading of the Story of Magi / Silent Night"	B-side of "Candy Cane Children"	Non-album single
"Red Bowling Ball Ruth"	B-side of "The Big Three Killed My Baby"	The White Stripes
"Red Death at 6:14"	Single	Non-album single
"Shelter Of Your Arms"	B-side of "The Denial Twist"	Get Behind Me Satan; Walking with a Ghost
"St. Ides of March"	B-side of "The Hardest Button to Button"	Elephant
"Sugar Never Tasted So Good"	B-side of "Lafayette Blues"	The White Stripes
"Though I Hear You Calling, I Will Not Answer"	B-side of "Blue Orchid"	Get Behind Me Satan
"Top Special"	Single	Non-album single
"Who's a Big Baby?"	B-side of "Blue Orchid"	Get Behind Me Satan
"Who's to Say"	B-side of "I Just Don't Know What to Do with Myself"	Elephant

== Live recordings ==
Any song that has not been studio recorded by The White Stripes, but officially released.

Song	Releases
"As Ugly As I Seem" (Live at KCRW's Morning Becomes Eclectic)	B-Side of The Denial Twist
"Black Math" (live)	B-Side of Jolene
"The Denial Twist" (Live at KCRW's Morning Becomes Eclectic)	B-Side of Walking with a Ghost
"Do" (live)	B-Side of Jolene
"Hotel Yorba" (Live at the Hotel Yorba)	B-Side of Hotel Yorba
"I Fought Piranhas/Let's Build a Home" (live at Electric Ladyland Studios)	B-Side of There's No Home For You Here
"I'm Finding It Harder to Be a Gentleman" (live at John Peel)	B-Side of I Just Don't Know What to Do with Myself
"Lafayette Blues" (Live on BBC Radio 1, Evening Session)	B-Side of I Just Don't Know What to Do with Myself
"Lovesick" (Live at The Forum)	B-Side of Fell in Love with a Girl
"Rated "X"" (Live at Hotel Yorba)	B-Side of Hotel Yorba
"Same Boy You've Always Known" (live at Manaus, Brazil)	B-Side of My Doorbell
"Screwdriver" (live)	Walking with a Ghost
"Stop Breaking Down" (Live on BBC Radio 1, Evening Session)	B-Side of Dead Leaves and the Dirty Ground
"Suzy Lee" (Live on BBC Radio 1, Evening Session)	B-Side of Dead Leaves and the Dirty Ground
"You Don't Know What Love Is (You Just Do as You're Told)" [Acoustic]	B-Side of You Don't Know What Love Is (You Just Do as You're Told)
"You've Got Her In Your Pocket" (live in Belfast)	B-Side of Blue Orchid

== Remixes ==
List of remixes and alternate versions of songs.

Song	Releases
"Blue Orchid" (High Contrast Mix)	B-Side of "My Doorbell"
"You're Pretty Good Looking (Trendy American Mix)	B-Side of "Lord, Send Me an Angel"
"Icky Thump" (Alternate mix)	Icky Thump Limited 12" vinyl
"Rag & Bone" (Alternate mix)	Icky Thump Limited 12" vinyl

== Notes ==
a: "Shelter Of Your Arms" was only released on the Japanese version of Walking with a Ghost.
