= The White Stripes discography =

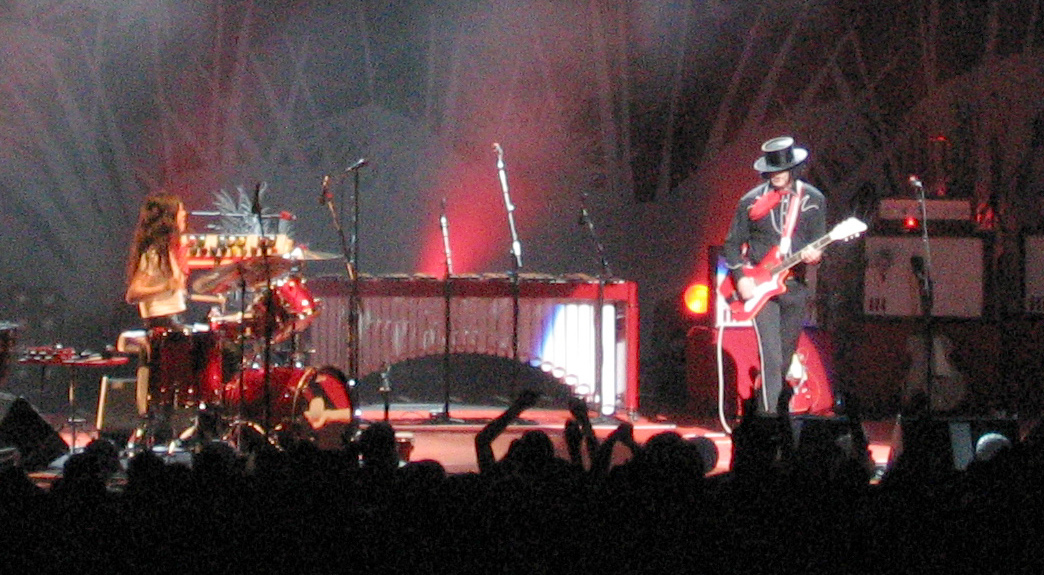
- Meg White and Jack White performing in 2005
- Studio albums: 6
- Extended plays: 1
- Live albums: 13
- Compilation albums: 1
- Singles: 28
- Video albums: 4

The American duo the White Stripes has released six studio albums, two live albums, one compilation album, four video albums, one extended play, and 28 singles.

After three singles, the White Stripes released their self-titled debut album in June 1999. Their second studio album, the well-received De Stijl, followed in June 2000. The band's third studio album, White Blood Cells, became their breakthrough album, receiving much acclaim while pushing the band to the forefront of alternative rock. They later signed to V2 Records and released their fourth studio album Elephant in April 2003. The album was a commercial success, peaking at number six on the US Billboard 200 and reaching the top ten in multiple other countries. Elephant has been certified platinum by the Recording Industry Association of America (RIAA). The album spawned the single "Seven Nation Army", which topped the US Billboard Alternative Songs chart and became the group's first appearance on the US Billboard Hot 100, where it peaked at number 76.

The band then released their fifth studio album Get Behind Me Satan in June 2005. The album peaked at number three on the Billboard 200 and spawned three singles, including the hit single "Blue Orchid". Icky Thump, the band's sixth and final album, followed in June 2007. Icky Thump became the band's highest-charting album on the Billboard 200, peaking at number two on the chart. The album also spawned the single "Icky Thump", which peaked at number 26 on the Billboard Hot 100 and became a top 10 hit in Canada and the United Kingdom.

== Albums ==
=== Studio albums ===
List of studio albums, with selected chart positions and certifications
Title	Album details	Peak chart positions										Certifications	Sales
Title	Album details	US	AUS	CAN	FRA	IRE	NLD	NOR	NZ	SWE	UK	Certifications	Sales
The White Stripes	Released: June 15, 1999; Label: Sympathy for the Record Industry, Third Man Records (Cassette); Formats: CD, LP, Cassette	—	—	—	159	—	—	—	—	—	142	BPI: Gold	US: 335,000
De Stijl	Released: June 20, 2000; Label: Sympathy for the Record Industry; Formats: CD, LP	—	—	—	164	—	—	—	—	—	137	BPI: Gold	US: 366,000
White Blood Cells	Released: July 3, 2001; Label: Sympathy for the Record Industry, Third Man Records (Cassette); Formats: CD, LP, Cassette	61	36	—	114	36	—	28	—	53	55	RIAA: Platinum; ARIA: Gold; BPI: Platinum; MC: Gold	US: 1,114,000
Elephant	Released: April 1, 2003; Label: V2; Formats: CD, LP	6	4	5	21	3	24	3	6	7	1	RIAA: 2× Platinum; ARIA: 2× Platinum; BPI: 3× Platinum; MC: 3× Platinum	US: 2,100,000; WW: 4,000,000
Get Behind Me Satan	Released: June 7, 2005; Label: V2; Formats: CD, LP	3	3	3	7	3	13	3	3	8	3	RIAA: Gold; ARIA: Platinum; BPI: Platinum; MC: Platinum	US: 920,000
Icky Thump	Released: June 15, 2007; Label: Third Man, Warner Bros.; Formats: CD, LP, digital download, USB flash drive	2	3	2	9	5	8	4	2	9	1	RIAA: Gold; ARIA: Gold; BPI: Gold; MC: Platinum	US: 801,000
"—" denotes a recording that did not chart or was not released in that territory.

=== Live albums ===
List of live albums, with selected chart positions
Title	Album details	Peak chart positions										Certifications
Title	Album details	US	AUS	CAN	FRA	IRE	NLD	NOR	NZ	SWE	UK	Certifications
Under Great White Northern Lights	Released: March 15, 2010; Label: V2; Formats: CD, LP, digital download	11	33	4	54	48	54	23	8	47	25	BPI: Silver
Under Great White Northern Lights – B-Shows	Released: 2010; Label: Third Man Records; Format: LP	—	—	—	—	—	—	—	—	—	—	
Live in Mississippi	Released: July 15, 2011; Label: Third Man; Format: LP	—	—	—	—	—	—	—	—	—	—	
Live at the Gold Dollar	Released: September 25, 2012; Label: Third Man; Format: LP	—	—	—	—	—	—	—	—	—	—	
Nine Miles from the White City	Released: July 10, 2013; Label: Third Man; Format: LP	—	—	—	—	—	—	—	—	—	—	
Live Under the Lights of the Rising Sun	Released: July 7, 2014; Label: Third Man; Format: LP	—	—	—	—	—	—	—	—	—	—	
Under Amazonian Lights	Released: March 2015; Label: Third Man; Format: LP	—	—	—	—	—	—	—	—	—	—	
Live at the Gold Dollar III	Released: December 2015; Label: Third Man; Formats: LP	—	—	—	—	—	—	—	—	—	—	
The Complete John Peel Sessions	Released: April 16, 2016 (vinyl); November 18, 2018 (CD); Label: Third Man / BBC; Format: Vinyl / CD	—	—	—	—	—	—	—	—	—	—	
The White Stripes' First Show: Live On Bastille Day	Released: July 14, 2017 / September 2012; Label: Third Man; Formats: Digital, LP	—	—	—	—	—	—	—	—	—	—	
Live at the Magic Bag	Released: December 2017; Label: Third Man; Format: LP	—	—	—	—	—	—	—	—	—	—	
Live at the Magic Stick	Released: Dec, 2017; Label: Third Man; Formats: LP	—	—	—	—	—	—	—	—	—	—	
Live at the Gold Dollar IV	Released: December 2017; Label: Third Man; Format: LP	—	—	—	—	—	—	—	—	—	—	
Live at the Detroit Institute of Arts	Released: December 2021; Label: Third Man; Format: LP	—	—	—	—	—	—	—	—	—	—	
Live in Las Vegas	Released: December 2023; Label: Third Man; Format: LP	—	—	—	—	—	—	—	—	—	—	
"—" denotes a recording that did not chart or was not released in that territory.

=== Compilation albums ===
List of compilation albums, with selected details
Title	Album details	Peak chart positions						Certifications
Title	Album details	US	AUS	CAN	IRE	NLD	UK	Certifications
The White Stripes Greatest Hits	Released: December 4, 2020 (US) / February 12, 2021 (Internationally) / February 26, 2021 (UK and Ireland); Label: Third Man, Columbia; Formats: CD, digital download, streaming	33	40	68	37	81	12	BPI: Gold

=== Video albums ===
List of video albums, with selected chart positions and certifications
Title	Album details	Peak chart positions		Certifications
Title	Album details	US Video	UK Video	Certifications
Under Blackpool Lights	Released: December 7, 2004; Label: Third Man; Formats: DVD	18	5	BPI: Gold
Under Great White Northern Lights	Released: March 15, 2010; Label: V2; Formats: DVD, Blu-ray	2	—	RIAA: Gold
Under Moorhead Lights All Fargo Night	Released: July 2012; Label: Third Man; Formats: DVD	—	—	
Under New Zealand Lights	Released: August 2012; Label: Third Man; Formats: DVD	—	—	
"—" denotes a recording that did not chart or was not released in that territory.

== Extended plays ==
List of extended plays, with selected chart positions
Title	Extended play details	Peak chart positions	
Title	Extended play details	SCO	UK
Walking with a Ghost	Released: December 6, 2005; Label: V2; Formats: CD	87	138

== Singles ==
List of singles, with selected chart positions and certifications, showing year released and album name
Title	Year	Peak chart positions										Certifications	Album
Title	Year	US	US Alt.	AUS	CAN	FRA	IRE	NLD	NOR	NZ	UK	Certifications	Album
"Let's Shake Hands"	1998	—	—	—	—	—	—	—	—	—	—		Non-album singles
"Lafayette Blues"	1998	—	—	—	—	—	—	—	—	—	—		Non-album singles
"The Big Three Killed My Baby"	1999	—	—	—	—	—	—	—	—	—	—		The White Stripes
"Hello Operator"	2000	—	—	—	—	—	—	—	—	—	—		De Stijl
"Lord, Send Me an Angel"	2000	—	—	—	—	—	—	—	—	—	—		Non-album singles
"Party of Special Things to Do"	2000	—	—	—	—	—	—	—	—	—	—		Non-album singles
"Hotel Yorba"	2001	—	—	— (Note: "Hotel Yorba" did not enter the Australian ARIA Singles Chart but peaked at number 20 on the ARIA Hitseekers Chart.)	—	—	—	88	—	—	26		White Blood Cells
"Fell in Love with a Girl"	2002	— (Note: "Fell in Love with a Girl" did not enter the Billboard Hot 100, but peaked at number 21 on the Bubbling Under Hot 100 Singles chart, which acts as a 25-song extension to the Hot 100.)	12	— (Note: "Fell in Love with a Girl" did not enter the Australian ARIA Singles Chart but peaked at number 14 on the ARIA Hitseekers Chart.)	—	—	—	—	—	—	21	BPI: Gold	White Blood Cells
"Dead Leaves and the Dirty Ground"	2002	—	19	—	—	—	—	—	—	—	25		White Blood Cells
"Candy Cane Children"	2002	—	—	—	—	—	—	—	—	—	—		Surprise Package Volume 2
"Seven Nation Army"	2003	76	1	17	— (Note: "Seven Nation Army" did not enter the Canadian Hot 100 chart, but peaked at number 61 on the Hot Canadian Digital Song Sales chart.)	48	22	42	—	—	7	RIAA: 2× Platinum; ARIA: 4× Platinum; BPI: 5× Platinum; MC: 9× Platinum; RMNZ: 7× Platinum; SNEP: Diamond	Elephant
"The Hardest Button to Button"	2003	—	8	54	—	—	42	90	—	—	23	MC: Gold; RMNZ: Gold	Elephant
"I Just Don't Know What to Do with Myself"	2003	—	25	54	—	—	—	92	—	34	13		Elephant
"There's No Home for You Here"	2004	—	—	—	—	—	—	—	—	—	—		Elephant
"Jolene"	2004	—	—	—	—	—	42	—	12	—	16		Under Blackpool Lights
"Blue Orchid"	2005	43	7	95	1	67	26	81	18	—	9	BPI: Silver; RMNZ: Gold	Get Behind Me Satan
"My Doorbell"	2005	— (Note: "My Doorbell" did not enter the Billboard Hot 100, but peaked at number 16 on the Bubbling Under Hot 100 Singles chart, which acts as a 25-song extension to the Hot 100.)	13	73	—	—	39	79	—	8	10	BPI: Silver; RMNZ: Gold	Get Behind Me Satan
"The Denial Twist"	2005	—	5	—	—	—	29	—	—	—	10		Get Behind Me Satan
"Top Special"	2005	—	—	—	—	—	—	—	—	—	—		Non-album single
"Icky Thump"	2007	26	1	46	9	83	21	—	—	—	2	RIAA: Platinum; BPI: Silver; RMNZ: Platinum	Icky Thump
"You Don't Know What Love Is (You Just Do as You're Told)"	2007	— (Note: "You Don't Know What Love Is (You Just Do as You're Told)" did not enter the Billboard Hot 100 chart, but peaked at number 24 on the Hot Singles Sales chart.)	9	— (Note: "You Don't Know What Love Is (You Just Do as You're Told)" did not enter the Australian ARIA Singles Chart but peaked at number 83 on the Australian Music Report Singles Chart.)	63	—	—	—	—	—	18		Icky Thump
"Conquest"	2007	— (Note: "Conquest" did not enter the Billboard Hot 100 chart, but peaked at number one on the Hot Singles Sales chart.)	30	—	—	100	—	—	—	—	30		Icky Thump
"Conquista"	2008	—	—	—	—	—	—	—	—	—	— (Note: "Conquista" did not enter the UK Singles Chart, but peaked at number 36 on the UK Physical Singles Chart.)		Non-album singles
"Signed D.C."	2011	—	—	—	—	—	—	—	—	—	—		Non-album singles
"City Lights"	2016	—	—	—	—	—	—	—	—	—	—		Jack White Acoustic Recordings 1998–2016
"—" denotes a recording that did not chart or was not released in that territory.

=== Promotional singles ===
Title	Year	Peak chart positions	Certifications	Album
Title	Year	CAN	Certifications	Album
"We're Going to Be Friends"	2002	—	RMNZ: Gold	White Blood Cells
"Red Death at 6:14" (Note: "Red Death at 6:14" was included in a special offer with Mojo magazine.)	2002	—		Sympathetic Sounds of Detroit
"Rag and Bone" (Note: "Rag and Bone" was released as a free red 7" vinyl with the June 6, 2007 issue of the NME magazine.)	2007	74		Icky Thump
"Ball and Biscuit"	2020	—		Elephant
"—" denotes a recording that did not chart or was not released in that territory.

=== Split singles ===
Title	Year	Other artist
"Hand Springs"/"Cedar Point '76"	2000	The Dirtbombs
