= The White Stripes Greatest Hits =

2020 greatest hits album by the White Stripes

Greatest hits album by the White Stripes
- Released: December 4, 2020
- Recorded: 1998–2007
- Length: 81:42
- Labels: Third Man; Columbia
- Producer: Jack White

The White Stripes chronology
Live at the Gold Dollar IV (2017)	The White Stripes Greatest Hits (2020)	Live at the Detroit Institute of Arts (2021)

The White Stripes Greatest Hits (Note: Also known as My Sister Thanks You and I Thank You: The White Stripes Greatest Hits) is a greatest hits compilation album by the American rock duo the White Stripes. released in America by Third Man and Columbia Records on December 4, 2020, and internationally on February 26, 2021. It contains a selection of songs from the band's six studio albums and the standalone singles "Let's Shake Hands" and "Jolene".

The only compilation and non-live release of the band since their 2011 disbandment, The White Stripes Greatest Hits was released with music videos and other memorabilia. The album received positive reviews from critics, who deemed it a fitting retrospect of the band's career.

== Background ==
The album is the band's only compilation in their history, and only non-live or non-video release since dissolving in 2011. On behalf of the band, Third Man Records stated: "We get that the idea of 'Greatest Hits' may seem irrelevant in the era of streaming, but we also wholeheartedly believe that great bands deserve a 'Greatest Hits'".

Of the 26 songs featured on the album, 14 were previously released as singles. Ben Blackwell, co-founder of Third Man and the band's archivist, detailed the stories behind certain tracks in a 2020 interview with Spin.

== Release ==
On October 6, 2020, the album was announced through Third Man, revealing that it consisted of twenty-six songs but only naming "Ball and Biscuit", which was then released as a promotional single. The band also relaunched their Instagram account to promote the album. On November 10, 2020, its full tracklist was revealed through a crossword puzzle, which "Third Man colleagues had trouble solving".

The White Stripes Greatest Hits was released in the United States by Third Man and Columbia Records on December 4, 2020, and was internationally released on February 26, 2021. Music videos for "Let's Shake Hands" and "Apple Blossom" were simultaneously released with the album, which were directed by Wartella: the former features rotoscoped footage of the band performing the song onstage.

On December 22, 2020, the band released a 90-minute animated yule log video, which was directed by Noah Sterling and features the artwork of Blue J.

== Reception ==
Professional ratings
Aggregate scores
Source	Rating
Metacritic	91/100
Review scores
Source	Rating
AllMusic	4.5/5 stars
And It Don't Stop	A
American Songwriter	5/5 stars
Clash	8/10
DIY	5/5 stars
The Independent	4/5 stars
Paste	9.0/10
Tom Hull – on the Web	B+

The White Stripes Greatest Hits was positively received by music critics. Review aggregating website Metacritic reports a normalized score of 89 out of 100 based on 8 reviews, indicating "universal acclaim". AllMusic editor Heather Phares wrote "The White Stripes Greatest Hits is filled with the same detail, wit, and willingness to subvert expectations that made the band so dynamic when they were active." She further wrote that "the collection's hand-curated feel is much more personal than the average best-of or streaming play list." The New Yorker's Amanda Petrusich said the album was "a good reminder of how odd and inventive the band was... It feels old-fashioned, even deliberately so, but it sounds awfully good."

Hal Horowitz of American Songwriter said "like all classic music, the songs, and especially the group's organic, iconoclastic unvarnished garage blues style, remain ageless. This generous 26 track collection handily covers all the album highlights, adding a few cool obscurities to the bit-bursting hour and 20 minute playing time." However, he was critical of the packaging. Clash magazine praised the album for reflecting "the evolution of the band without ever becoming a predictable, chronologically ordered 'Singles Collection'." The Irish Times wrote "Everything here lays out, with a typical minimum of fuss, their low-fidelity aesthetic... console/engage yourself with a rowdy gathering of rock, roll and everything in between." The Independent's Mark Beaumont felt that tracks from their self-titled debut could have been swapped for their later works, but nonetheless said "The faithful will feel more than sated, and newcomers will find more to suck on here than a peppermint bass drum."

Emma Swann of DIY praised the "non-linear" track listing, which she said allowed fans to "rediscover the band again" and stated that the record "feels more like opening a time capsule than self-congratulation; as if that 2011 statement (their breakup) locked a door we’re only now allowed to peek back into." Eric Danton of Paste felt that there was instead a lack of organization, but that it ultimately helped the album nonetheless: "skipping back and forth among albums and sounds demonstrates anew just how idiosyncratic The White Stripes could be" and wrote "this collection also documents an influential piece of the indie-rock revival of the early 2000s... that's as compelling a reason as any to dig into their music all over again."

== Track listing ==
All lyrics are written by Jack White, except where noted; all music is composed by Jack and Meg White, except where noted.

The White Stripes Greatest Hits track listing
No.	Title	Writer(s)	Original album	Length
1.	"Let's Shake Hands"		Non-album single (1998)	2:04
2.	"The Big Three Killed My Baby"		The White Stripes (1999)	2:29
3.	"Fell in Love with a Girl"		White Blood Cells (2001)	1:50
4.	"Hello Operator"		De Stijl (2000)	2:36
5.	"I'm Slowly Turning into You"		Icky Thump (2007)	4:34
6.	"The Hardest Button to Button"		Elephant (2003)	3:32
7.	"The Nurse"		Get Behind Me Satan (2005)	3:47
8.	"Screwdriver"		The White Stripes	3:14
9.	"Dead Leaves and the Dirty Ground"		White Blood Cells	3:03
10.	"Death Letter"	Son House	De Stijl	4:29
11.	"We're Going to Be Friends"		White Blood Cells	2:22
12.	"The Denial Twist"		Get Behind Me Satan	2:35
13.	"I Just Don't Know What to Do with Myself"	Burt Bacharach, Hal David	Elephant	2:46
14.	"Astro"		The White Stripes	2:42
15.	"Conquest"	Corky Robbins	Icky Thump	2:48
16.	"Jolene"	Dolly Parton	Non-album single (2000)	3:17
17.	"Hotel Yorba"		White Blood Cells	2:10
18.	"Apple Blossom"		De Stijl	2:13
19.	"Blue Orchid"		Get Behind Me Satan	2:37
20.	"Ball and Biscuit"		Elephant	7:18
21.	"I Fought Piranhas"		The White Stripes	3:07
22.	"I Think I Smell a Rat"		White Blood Cells	2:04
23.	"Icky Thump"		Icky Thump	4:14
24.	"My Doorbell"		Get Behind Me Satan	4:01
25.	"You're Pretty Good Looking (For a Girl)"		De Stijl	1:49
26.	"Seven Nation Army"		Elephant	3:51
Total length:				81:42

== Personnel ==
Personnel taken from the album's liner notes, except where noted.

The White Stripes

- Jack White – guitar, vocals, piano, organ, synthesizer, marimba
- Meg White – drums, vocals; synthesizer on "Icky Thump"

Additional musicians

- John Szymanski – harmonica on "Hello Operator"
- Eddie Gillis – tambourine & shakers on "The Denial Twist"
- Regulo Aldama – trumpet on "Conquest"
- Johnny Walker – 2nd slide guitar on "I Fought Piranhas"

Production

- Jack White – production
- Jeff Meier – recording on "Let's Shake Hands"
- Jim Diamond – co-production and engineering on "The Big Three Killed My Baby", "Screwdriver", "Astro" and "I Fought Piranhas"; mixing on "Hello Operator", "Death Letter", "Apple Blossom" and "You're Pretty Good Looking (For a Girl)"
- Stewart Sikes – engineering and mixing on "Fell in Love with a Girl", "Dead Leaves and the Dirty Ground", "We're Going to Be Friends", "Hotel Yorba", and "I Think I Smell a Rat"
- Liam Watson – engineering, recording, and mixing on "The Hardest Button to Button", "I Just Don't Know What to Do with Myself", "Ball and Biscuit", and "Seven Nation Army"
- Matthew Kettle – recording on "The Nurse", "The Denial Twist", "Blue Orchid" and "My Doorbell"
- John Hampton – mix engineer on "The Nurse", "The Denial Twist", "Blue Orchid" and "My Doorbell"
- Adam Hill – assistant mix engineer on "The Nurse", "The Denial Twist", "Blue Orchid" and "My Doorbell"
- Joe Chiccarelli – recording and mixing on "I'm Slowly Turning into You", "Conquest" and "Icky Thump"
- Lowell Reynolds – recording assistance on "I'm Slowly Turning into You", "Conquest" and "Icky Thump"

Artwork

- Pieter M. van Hattem – photography
- Jordan Williams – design

== Charts ==
=== Weekly charts ===
Weekly chart performance for The White Stripes Greatest Hits
Chart (2020–2021)	Peak position
Australian Albums (ARIA)	40
Austrian Albums (Ö3 Austria)	8
Belgian Albums (Ultratop Flanders)	6
Belgian Albums (Ultratop Wallonia)	23
Canadian Albums (Billboard)	68
Dutch Albums (Album Top 100)	81
German Albums (Offizielle Top 100)	7
Irish Albums (Official Charts)	37
Italian Albums (FIMI)	75
Japanese Albums (Oricon)	47
Polish Albums (ZPAV)	46
Portuguese Albums (AFP)	15
Scottish Albums (Official Charts)	6
Swedish Physical Albums (Sverigetopplistan)	17
Swiss Albums (Schweizer Hitparade)	37
UK Albums (Official Charts)	12
US Billboard 200	33
US Top Rock Albums (Billboard)	2

=== Year-end charts ===
Year-end chart performance for The White Stripes Greatest Hits
Chart (2021)	Position
US Top Rock Albums (Billboard)	66

== Certifications ==
Region	Certification	Certified units/sales
New Zealand (RMNZ)	Gold	7,500^{‡}
United Kingdom (BPI)	Gold	100,000^{‡}
^{‡} Sales+streaming figures based on certification alone.
