= The White Stripes videography =

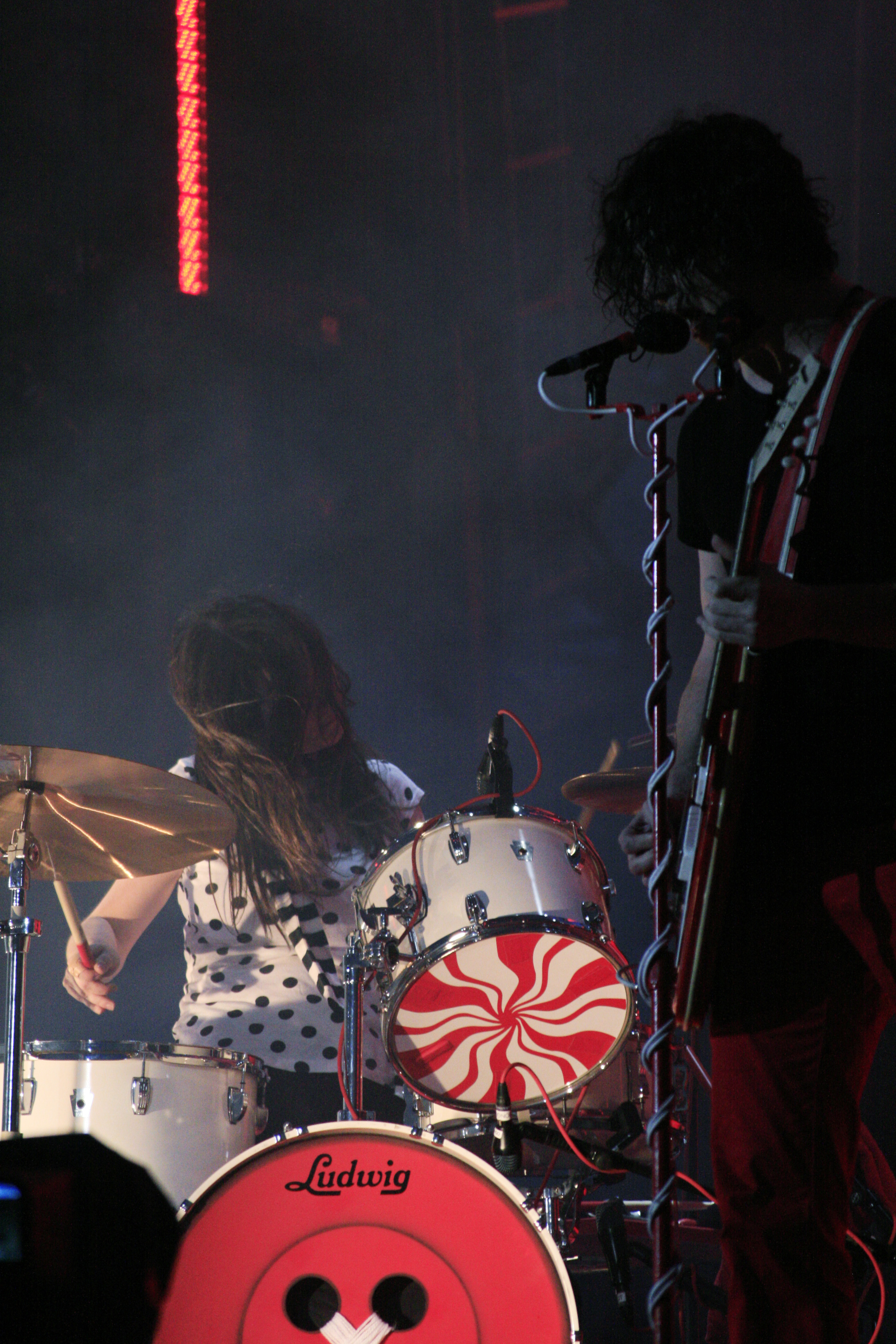
The White Stripes performing at the Wireless Festival in 2007

The American duo the White Stripes has released four video albums, two concert films, and has been featured in over twenty music videos. They frequently collaborated with filmmaker Michel Gondry and directing brothers the Malloys during their career, and have worked with Wartella and independent directors since their 2011 disbandment.

From their third album, White Blood Cells (2001), the White Stripes released videos for the singles "Hotel Yorba", "We're Going to Be Friends", "Fell in Love with a Girl", and "Dead Leaves and the Dirty Ground". The third of these received three MTV Video Music Awards and a nomination for Video of the Year. The band's fourth studio album, Elephant (2003), released the music videos for their signature song "Seven Nation Army" and "The Hardest Button to Button", which netted further accolades. The following year, the band released their first concert film Under Blackpool Lights (2004), which spawned the live video "Jolene". Their final two albums, Get Behind Me Satan (2005) and Icky Thump (2007), produced videos including "Blue Orchid" and Conquest", which were nominated for more MTV Video Music Awards. The band issued a second concert film, Under Great White Northern Lights (2010), which won the Grammy Award for Best Boxed or Special Limited Edition Package and was nominated for the Grammy for Best Music Film.

The White Stripes appeared in a handful of films and a 2006 episode of The Simpsons. Their first and only leading role was in Jim Jarmusch's anthology film Coffee and Cigarettes (2003), where they played fictionalized versions of themselves in the segment "Jack Shows Meg His Tesla Coil". They appeared in the documentaries The Fearless Freaks (2005) which chronicles the history of the Flaming Lips, and It Might Get Loud (2008) which covers the careers of rock guitarists. The White Stripes dissolved in 2011, and subsequent media releases are handled by Third Man Records.

== Music videos ==
Key
•	Denotes music videos directed by Jack and/or Meg White

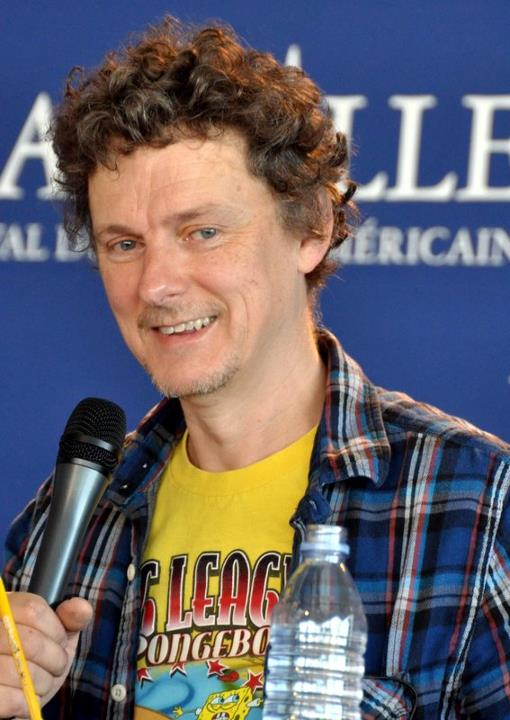
The White Stripes frequently collaborated with filmmaker Michel Gondry, who directed five of the band's videos.

List of music videos, showing year released and director
Title	Year	Other performer(s) credited	Director(s)	Ref.
"Hotel Yorba"	2001	None	Anthony Ernest Garth, Dan Miller	
"We're Going to Be Friends"	2002	None	Kevin Carrico, Anthony Ernest Garth	
"Fell in Love with a Girl"	2002	None	Michel Gondry	
"Dead Leaves and the Dirty Ground"	2002	None	Michel Gondry	
"Seven Nation Army"	2003	None	Alex and Martin	
"I Just Don't Know What to Do with Myself"	2003	None	Sofia Coppola	
"The Hardest Button to Button"	2003	None	Michel Gondry	
"Hotel Yorba" (live)	2004	None	Dick Carruthers	
"Jolene" (live)	2004	None	Dick Carruthers	
"Blue Orchid"	2005	None	Floria Sigismondi	
"My Doorbell"	2005	None	The Malloys	
"The Denial Twist"	2005	None	Michel Gondry	
"Icky Thump" •	2007	None	The Malloys, Jack White	
"You Don't Know What Love Is (You Just Do as You're Told)"	2007	None	The Malloys	
"Conquest"	2007	None	Diane Martel	
"City Lights"	2016	None	Michel Gondry	
"Apple Blossom"	2020	None	Wartella	
"Let's Shake Hands"	2020	None	Wartella	
"Seven Nation Army (The Glitch Mob Remix)"	2021	The Glitch Mob	Stripmall	
"Black Math"	2023	None	Wartella	
"Red Rain"	2025	None	Conor Callahan	

== Video albums ==
List of video albums with descriptions
Title	Album details	Description
Under Blackpool Lights	Released: December 7, 2004; Label: Third Man; Formats: DVD	Contains concert footage of the White Stripes's two performances at the Empress Ballroom from January 27–28, 2004.
Under Great White Northern Lights	Released: March 15, 2010; Label: V2; Formats: DVD, Blu-ray	Contains concert and off-concert footage of the White Stripes's tour across Canada during the summer of 2007.
Under Moorhead Lights All Fargo Night	Released: July 2012; Label: Third Man; Formats: DVD	Contains concert footage of a performance in Moorhead, Minnesota on June 13, 2000.
Under New Zealand Lights	Released: August 2012; Label: Third Man; Formats: DVD	Contains concert footage from a performance in Auckland in November 2000 and a performance in Freemans Bay in October 2003.

== Filmography ==
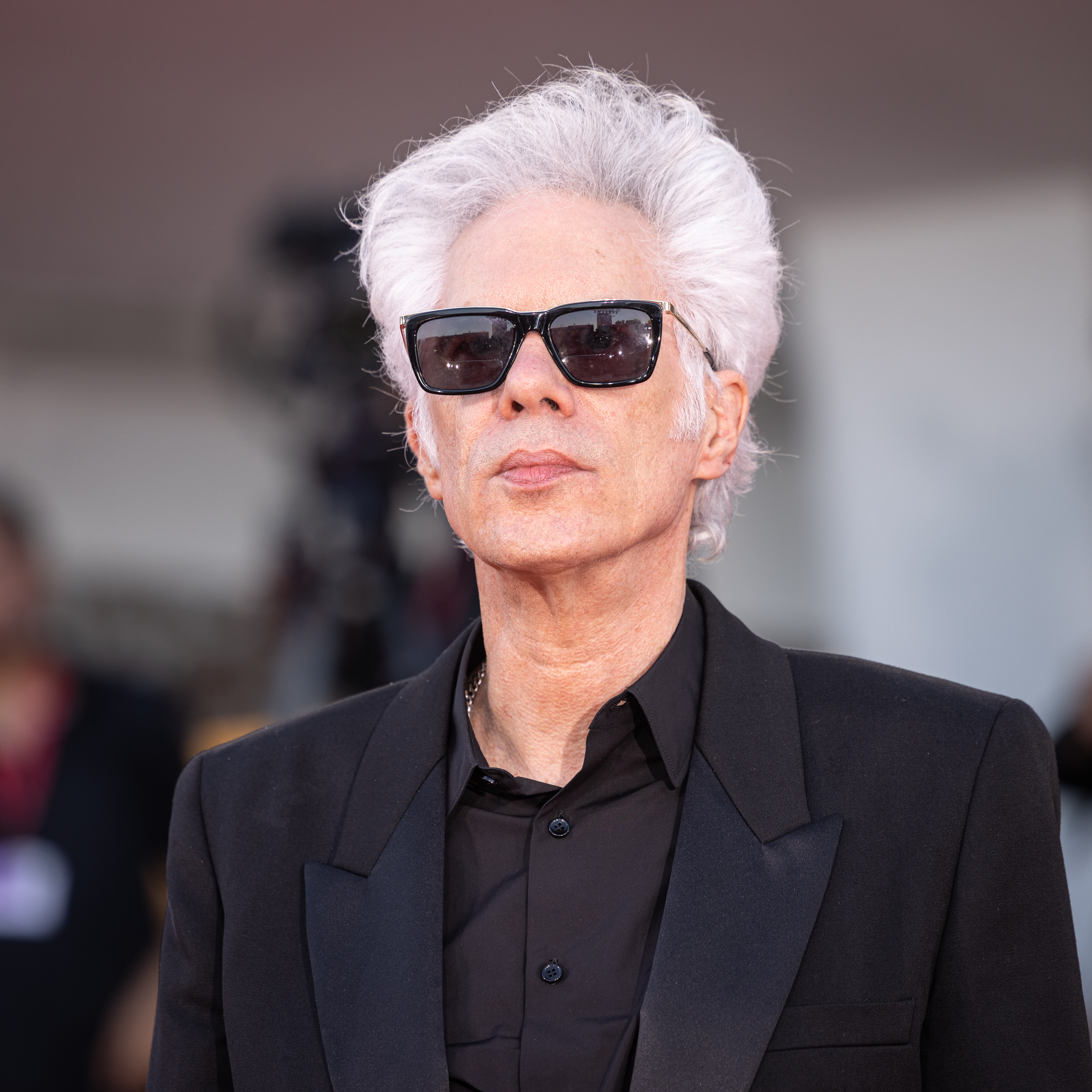
Director Jim Jarmusch cast the White Stripes in his anthology film Coffee and Cigarettes (2003) in leading roles.

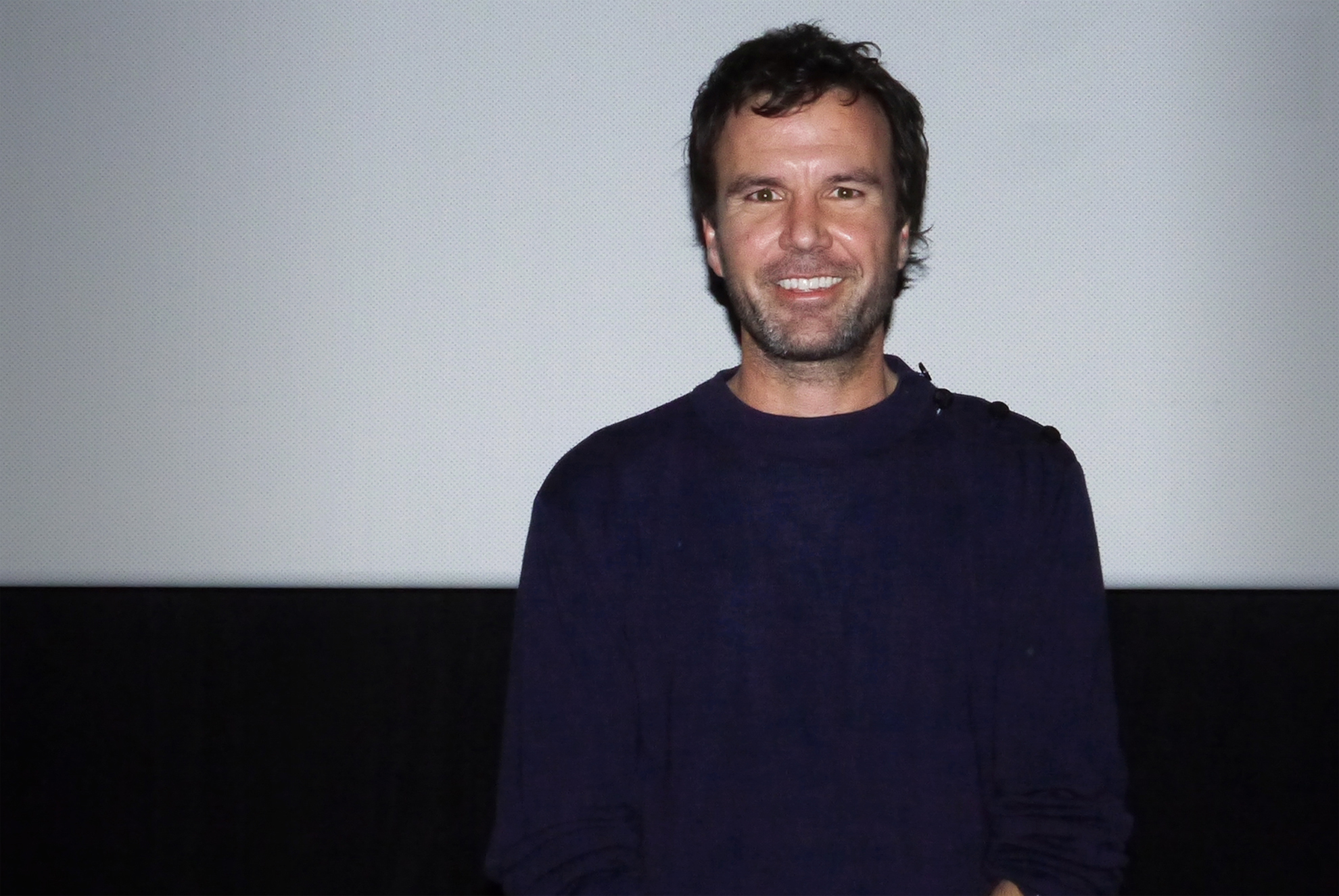
Emmett Malloy directed the White Stripes rockumentary Under Great White Northern Lights (2010), which won a Grammy Award from two nominations.

=== Film ===
Title	Year	Roles	Notes	Ref.
Coffee and Cigarettes	2003	Jack, Meg	Feature film; segment: "Jack Shows Meg His Tesla Coil"	
Under Blackpool Lights	2004	Themselves	Concert film	
The Fearless Freaks	2005	Themselves	Documentary	
It Might Get Loud	2008	Themselves	Documentary	
Under Great White Northern Lights	2009	Themselves	Rockumentary	

=== Television ===
Title	Year	Roles	Notes	Ref.
Backstage Pass	2000	Musical guest		
Later... with Jools Holland	2001	Musical guest		
Late Show with David Letterman	2002	Musical guest		
MTV Movie Awards	2002	Musical guest		
MTV Video Music Awards	2002	Musical guest		
Top of the Pops	2002	Musical guest		
Saturday Night Live	2002	Musical guest	Episode: "Senator John McCain/The White Stripes"	
Late Night with Conan O'Brien	2003–2009	Musical guest	Recurring guest	
46th Annual Grammy Awards	2004	Musical guest		
Pancake Mountain	2004	Themselves	Unknown episode	
The Daily Show	2005	Musical guest		
From the Basement	2005	Musical guest	Episode: "Episode 1"	
The Simpsons	2006	Themselves	Voice role; episode: "Jazzy and the Pussycats"	
