= Hello Operator =

Hello Operator may refer to:

- "Hello Operator" (song), a song by the White Stripes
- "Miss Susie", a children's song also known as "Hello Operator"
