= The White Stripes (album) =

Studio album by the White Stripes
- Released: June 15, 1999
- Recorded: January–February 1999
- Studios: Third Man (Note: Third Man is The White Stripes' former home in Detroit per liner notes.); Ghetto Recorders (Detroit, Michigan)
- Genres: Blues rock; punk rock; country rock; garage rock
- Length: 43:38
- Label: Sympathy for the Record Industry
- Producer: Jack White

The White Stripes chronology
The White Stripes (1999)	De Stijl (2000)

Singles from The White Stripes
- 1. "The Big Three Killed My Baby" Released: March 1999

The White Stripes is the debut studio album by American rock duo the White Stripes, released in June 1999 by Sympathy for the Record Industry. It was produced by lead vocalist and guitarist Jack White and Jim Diamond. Musically, The White Stripes features elements of blues, punk, country and garage rock. It includes three cover songs and is dedicated to blues musician Son House.

Distribution of The White Stripes was limited as Sympathy was an independent label, and it failed to chart in the United States. Sympathy's owner was inevitably unable to keep up with demand. "The Big Three Killed My Baby" was released as the only single and promotional effort. The album was rereleased in the UK and the US by XL and V2 respectively, and in 2013 was certified gold by the British Phonographic Industry. It received generally positive reviews from critics. Of the album, Jack said in 2003, "I still feel we've never topped our first album. It's the most raw, the most powerful, and the most Detroit-sounding record we've made."

== Background and recording ==
The White Stripes formed in 1997, and began performing as part of the underground Michigan rock scene, releasing two singles over the next year. In 1998, they signed with Long Beach, California-based Sympathy for the Record Industry. At the time, Jack was involved in another band, The Go, who were offered an exclusive contract with the Seattle, Washington-based record label Sub Pop. A demo that was recorded in the Whites' living room with his equipment was sent to a Hollywood producer who was working on a film based on Detroit music, which ended up in the hands of Sub Pop. Jack did not want to cede contractual rights of The White Stripes to Sub Pop, however the next year, the White Stripes did work with Sub Pop on a single of Captain Beefheart covers and met Ian Montone, who became their manager, through the label. As well as being completely unsatisfied with his guitar parts on their debut album which he did not have time to fix before mixing, Jack was reportedly prone to frequent outbursts in the studio out of frustration with his malfuctioning equipment and the producer felt Jack's relationship issues were being taken out on them. The producer was taking inspiration from Little Richard and was fine with the guitar work, whereas conversely, Jack strongly believed the record was being overproduced. Additionally, Jack had been working with Detroit rock band The Hentchmen, featuring on their limited-edition single composed of covers of "Some Other Guy" (the Beatles' rendition performed on Live at the BBC) and "Psycho Daisies" by the Yardbirds, as well as featuring on their album Hentch-Forth (1998). (Note: The version of the album stylized as Hentch-Forth.Five featured "Some Other Guy" and "Psycho Daisies" as the first two songs on the tracklist. The original version realeased in 1998 did not include those songs on the album at all, however Jack played the bass and did vocals throughout the album except on those two aforementioned songs in which he played the guitar and did vocals.) Covering "Some Other Guy" was Jack's idea, therefore it was recorded in his living room, engineered by Rocket 455's Jeff Meier. That single was recorded and released at the same time as "Let's Shake Hands". The Go's album was recorded three weeks before The White Stripes. Jack left the band in autumn 1999, before the release of their album.

In taking inspiration from his "idol" Orson Welles, Jack wanted the complete creative control of an auteur and did not want to work with another producer in the White Stripes but had no technical knowledge of recording or audio engineering. Jack relied on the sound and the amateur producing he had done for other bands in the attic. He purposely avoided learning too much about audio engineering as it would have led him to unremittingly tinker with equipment and abandon making music entirely. As for Meg, who gradually began to develop skills, Jack tried begging her not to practice in an attempt to retain the original energy of when she decided to play the instrument. Regardless, Meg took stylistic inspiration from Ringo Starr as "[he] knew what was needed, and he did was what right for the band," and applied her feelings to the music rather than technique. Jack said he felt "jealous" of Meg's ability to remove the technical side of listening to music, as he is more of a decontructionist, and their male-female dynamic onstage was born from that contrast. Meg also said their dynamic worked because of their opposite sexes, which removed "male-ego combat" from the situation. In a 2003 interview with Australian radio station Triple J, Jack said, "It's hard to almost, you know, bridge the gap between playing for other people [onstage], and sharing with them, than playing for ourselves. It's always been a difficult question for me." Meg later said they are "very similar and very different" in their idealism about music, and previously expressed the same sentiment of making music for themselves. Aspiring to become a film director himself, between this album and De Stijl (2000), Jack was working as a production assistant on commercials to supplement his income though had a negative experience in that job. Nevertheless, while working as a production assistant, he worked for director and cinematographer Kevin Carrico, who would go on to film and direct the 2001 music videos for "Hotel Yorba" and "We're Going to Be Friends", respectively. If Jack had not gained traction in music, he would have pursued directing full time and as of 2026, still plans to direct a feature film. As a producer, Jack describes his process as "directing" the song from a neutral point of view. The album's cover art was in homage to Jack's favorite film, Citizen Kane (1941). Jack's personal goal was to make an album before 25, in large part because Welles had directed Citizen Kane at that age. In his community, he was discouraged from dreaming of making an album as that would be like "dreaming of winning the lottery." The ability for the band to make 7 inch singles was Jack's metric of success, as he assumed no one outside Detroit would care about their style or configuration, hence "making an album and doing tours [was] all sort of gravy on the mashed potatoes." Their biggest goal early on was to open for the Cramps, but when the opportunity came, the Cramps did not offer them more than they were already earning per show, though Meg held out hope that they would perform together.

The White Stripes was recorded in four to six days in January 1999, beginning a custom for The White Stripes to record albums in winter. Additional overdubs and mixing were done in February 1999. Most of the album's songs were recorded with Jim Diamond at Ghetto Recorders, with the exception of "Screwdriver", "Astro", "I Fought Piranhas", "Let's Shake Hands", "Look Me Over Closely", and "St. James Infirmary Blues", "Lafayette Blues" and "Sugar Never Tasted So Good" which were recorded in Jack's and Meg's living room (doing business as Third Man Studios in Detroit, Michigan). The first single, "Let's Shake Hands", was recorded at home on Jack's Otari quarter-inch 8-track recorder. His alternate quarter-inch reel-to-reel recorder was broken for the ensuing singles and used a friend's 8-track ADAT recorder, which he considers a "horrible format." After the album, he bought a half-inch TASCAM 8-track. A 1953 Revere reel-to-reel tape recorder was used to record the majority of the vocals. An obsolete yet fully functional Electrodyne console that had been donated by Interlochen Center for the Arts was used for mixing and Shure SM57 microphones were used on the Electro-Voice speaker. Jack insisted it sound like a live album and a 1950s RCA microphone was used for that effect, though Diamond maintained they should have actually recorded the album in a live venue if they wanted to authentically achieve that sound.

Jack used his Japanese-made Crestwood Astral II guitar and a DigiTech Whammy pedal throughout the album. Contrary to what became popular belief about this album when the band gained mainstream attention years later, Jack modeled his singing voice after Paul McCartney's in The Beatles' cover of "Hippy Hippy Shake" from Live at the BBC, rather than that of Robert Plant, whom he wasn't that much of a fan of. The comparison to Plant, as well as comparisons to Roky Erickson and Janis Joplin, annoyed Jack who insisted he was just performing in his vocal range. Despite the inhospitable conditions of the studio, Meg insisted on performing barefoot. Because Meg was a novice drummer at the time, frequent takes were required that consumed a portion of the $2,500 to $3,000 budget provided by the label. At 23 years old, it was a significant expenditure particularly for Jack, and is by all accounts a contributing factor to De Stijl, being recorded at their home rather than the studio (to Diamond's chagrin). "Let's Build A Home" was recorded for the album but would instead go on to appear on De Stijl; a cover of Manfred Mann's rendition of "My Little Red Book", written by Burt Bacharach and Hal David, was also recorded, however it was not included on the album. "My Little Red Book" was ultimately included in the 20th anniversary box set of the album. Unlike subsequent albums, all songs were written prior to the recording of the album, whereas later, numerous songs were written in their respective studios. "Dead Leaves and the Dirty Ground" was recorded for the album, but was not released until their third album, White Blood Cells (2001). Many other songs written before The White Stripes (primarily for Two-Star Tabernacle) subsequently ended up on White Blood Cells, and two others ended up on Elephant (2003) and Icky Thump (2007), respectively.

Silk, Satin and Suede was under consideration for the album title as it would've been a play on The Detroit Cobras' debut album title Mink, Rat or Rabbit (1998). None Dare Call It Conspiracy, named after the 1971 anti-communist book, was also under consideration. Because Jack and Meg had separated by the time the album was recorded, Jack's wedding ring was edited out of the album artwork.

=== Tour ===
The White Stripes were "not really crazy about touring" for this album. They only did less than 20 concerts from March 1999 to March 2000, as they would not have retained a booking agent until De Stijl. Outside of primarily performing in Detroit, Hamtramck, and Ferndale, Michigan they notably opened for Pavement (in September 1999) in Towson, Maryland, Raleigh, North Carolina, and Athens, Georgia before returning to the Midwest. In November, they performed in Milwaukee, Wisconsin and Detroit. The next year, they continued performing in Detroit and Chicago, Illinois, before going to Cleveland, Ohio; Madison, Wisconsin; and returning to its final stop in Milwaukee on March 17, 2000. One week after the tour's conclusion, Jack and Meg officially divorced.

== Music ==
"The first song on our first album starts off with Meg. The last sound on the album is by Johnny Walker, who plays slide guitar with us on the last song."

— Jack's detail on the debut album.

Johnny Walker of the Soledad Brothers played slide guitar on two songs: "Suzy Lee" and "I Fought Piranhas". Walker is credited with having taught Jack how to play slide, a technique featured heavily on the White Stripes' first two albums. Walker explains, "[Jack] had a four track in his living room and invited me to come by and do some recording. In return, I showed him how to play slide." Walker worked for free. In 2000, Jack described it as a "really angry" LP. Notwithstanding his opinion that they never topped their first album in all of its Detroit character, he felt he went overboard on the rawness and reverb.

The White Stripes is a blues rock, punk rock, country rock, and arena rock album. It is dedicated to the blues musician Son House, who is an inspiration to Jack, and they thank Johnny Walker, Jim Diamond, Ben Blackwell, Ko Melina, Dan John Miller, Meg's sister, one of Jack's brothers, and Brian Muldoon among others.

== Songs ==
=== Tracks 1–9 ===
"Jimmy the Exploder", one of the few White Stripes songs that begin with Meg's drums, was the first original song the White Stripes ever performed, on July 14, 1997, at the Gold Dollar venue in Detroit, Michigan. As Meg had only started learning how to play the drums two months earlier, and was prone to struggling with the tempo on the song in its early live performances, Jack would often coach her during shows by using counts.

"Stop Breaking Down" is a cover of blues musician Robert Johnson's 1938 single. It was going to be the B-side of "The Big Three Killed My Baby" so as to be an "anti-automotive 45" but was put on the album instead; Jack was unaware that The Rolling Stones also covered it for Exile on Main Street (1972) and was not inspired by them to do so.

"The Big Three Killed My Baby" is about the Big Three auto manufacturers (namely Ford Motor Company, General Motors, and Chrysler Corporation) who have headquarters in or near Detroit, Michigan. The song is perceived to be a protest song against the auto industry. The song is also a play on the number three, Jack's favorite number. Jack wrote the song for Andre Williams, but he declined it and thought Jack should do it instead. Jack also considered it for his former band Two-Star Tabernacle, although it didn't fit the country genre that the band peformed.

"Suzy Lee" is one of two songs on the album to feature Johnny Walker as the additional guitarist. Her character would later appear in "We're Going to Be Friends" and the band's fifth album, Get Behind Me Satan, was dedicated to her in the liner notes. (Note: Suzy Lee is by all accounts a completely fictional character and not inspired by a real person whom Jack knew.) She also appears in the children's book version of "We're Going to Be Friends".

"Sugar Never Tasted So Good" is the B-side of "Lafayette Blues", the band's second single. It was originally written in 1996. The song gained some local success, as it was the first instance of fans singing along to a White Stripes song. Both songs were recorded at home and mixed at Ghetto Recorders. In the studio version, Meg did not perform a full drum beat, instead using a cardboard box, and the knocking sound comes from Jack's guitar (although in live performances of the song, she played the drums and the knocking sound effect was taken out). In re-releasing the song on his solo acoustic album, Acoustic Recordings 1998–2016, Jack revealed he would happily license the song for Nutrasweet or Splenda in commercial use.

"Wasting My Time" is said to have been inspired by Bob Dylan, due to its similarities to "One More Cup of Coffee", a Dylan cover which is the 13th track on the album. It was also compared to the work of Van Morrison.

"Cannon" interpolates "John the Revelator", a blues and gospel song performed by Son House. Sometimes "John the Revelator" was performed on its own, such as in an appearance on Late Night with Conan O'Brien in 2003 and sometimes, Jack would add "Electric Funeral" by Black Sabbath to the song, as the riffs are similar. Jack said he likes to use the instrumental as a MacGuffin multiple times throughout a show to segue to the next song.

"Astro", inspired by Jack's pet Jasper, is a generic reference to "anything you do that no one knows about". It mentions inventors Thomas Edison and Nikola Tesla.

"Broken Bricks" was co-written by one of Jack's older brothers, Stephen. The song is possibly in reference to the abandoned buildings of Detroit, Michigan.

=== Tracks 10–17 ===
"When I Hear My Name" is one of the top 10 most-performed songs the White Stripes ever did and its riff was likely inspired by blues musician John Lee Hooker's blues standard "Boom Boom". In a 2009 interview with British music critic Barney Hoskyns, Jack said, "There have been times that [he] wanted to disappear" as well as "and times where I've posed gladly for photographs" which are a "necessary evil" in music and fame.

"Do" was written about a year before the album was released, having first been performed at a local fair in July 1998. The lyrics depict an extreme case of social anxiety and alienation. In a 2007 interview, Jack expounded upon how in his entire life his extroverted personality has often come across as discomfiting and inappropriate to other people in his social environment, which has made him more inhibited with age, and fame changed many people's interactions with him, especially that of crew members. As a child he struggled to make friends, particularly due to an extremely obstinate nature which he came to regret.

"Screwdriver" was written spontaneously about a random screwdriver that happened to be sitting in the attic of the Whites' home during a rehearsal. The band performed it during their first nationally televised appearance (The Late Late Show in 2001).

"One More Cup of Coffee" is a cover of the fourth song on Bob Dylan's album Desire. Critics consider it one of the best Dylan covers.

"Little People", the first in the "little" series of songs by the White Stripes, had an alternate title of "Big Girl". "Slicker Drips" was rarely performed live and never performed after the year 2000, though it was the first song they ever used as an encore.

"St. James Infirmary Blues" is a cover of a blues and jazz standard. This rendition is credited to Ukrainian-American music publisher Joe Primrose. It was the first song the White Stripes ever performed live (on July 14, 1997). They found the song from watching an animated short of Betty Boop called Snow-White.

"I Fought Piranhas", which features Johnny Walker on guitar, was likely written before Meg started playing the drums and was recorded in the Whites' living room. The song's original refrain was "I Fought the Boar". The song was inpsired by Ernest Hemingway's novella The Old Man and the Sea (1952), by Jesus, and partly inspired by Patti Smith mentioning piranhas in her song "Summer Cannibals".

=== Bonus tracks ===
"Let's Shake Hands" is the band's debut single, recorded at their home; its B-side is "Look Me Over Closely", a cover of a Marlene Dietrich song written by Terry Gilkyson. "Let's Shake Hands" was often used as their first song during concerts. Jack considers it the epitome of their Detroit rock style and that they will "never top that." When looking for a quote that would summarize the band, Jack serendipitously found a quote attributed to President George Washington about the American flag, (Note: When asked about a connection between the band name and the American flag, Jack gave other references.) by opening an encyclopedia to the page it was on, that said: "We take the stars from the blue union from heaven, the red from our mother country, separating it by white stripes, thus showing we have separated from her, and the white stripes shall go down to posterity representing liberty." This quote was inserted into the sleeve of the single. The initial batch of "Let's Shake Hands" single took three years to sell out. "Look Me Over Closely" was covered out of contrarianism toward the idea that a blues-based band wouldn't do a song like that, (Note: Another Sympathy for the Record Industry artist also covered the song before them, but Jack did not specify whom.) as Jack said in 2001, "[their] music has a lot of elements of Broadway and punk coming together." In 2026, Jack recalled on covering the song, "We came out of the gate making sure people knew that we weren’t just this punk blues thing. We had lots of different things happening." Bay Area punk zine Maximum Rocknroll characterized the cover as like that of "a lost track from Tommy" and the work of French singer Édith Piaf.

"Lafayette Blues" is a limited edition single inspired by all the streets with French names in Detroit (the lyrics list them one by one, pronounced in French). This was likely in reference to the White Stripes' first ever performance being on Bastille Day. The song was originally recorded with Jack's side project The Upholsterers. There were initially only 15 copies of the "Lafayette Blues / Sugar Never Tasted So Good" single, sold at the Gold Dollar, due to a pressing plant delay as well as delays at the printing shop in Ypsilanti, Michigan so Dave Buick (who owned Italy Records) had the records made at an Ohio plant. In haste, the plant did not change its dye and the records came out pinkish-red. In spring 2026, a now-deceased, elderly Dearborn, Michigan man was discovered to have owned a stockpile of Detroit-related memorabilia including two of the 15 copies. In summer 2026, an unidentified buyer paid $25,000 for the copy signed by Jack (who signed it John White III, his legal signature) and Meg. Some editions of White Blood Cells featured "Lafayette Blues" on a bonus DVD.

=== Outtakes ===
Outtakes for the album include "Red Bowling Ball Ruth", "Why Can't You Be Nicer to Me?", "Let's Build a Home", "Dead Leaves and the Dirty Ground", and a cover of "My Little Red Book". "Red Bowling Ball Ruth" would be released as the b-side for the album's single, "Why Can't You Be Nicer to Me?" and "Let's Build a Home" would be included on De Stijl (2000), and the aforementioned "Dead Leaves and the Dirty Ground" would be included on White Blood Cells.

== Critical reception ==
Professional ratings
Review scores
Source	Rating
AllMusic	4/5 stars
Pitchfork	8.3/10
Rolling Stone Album Guide	3.5/5 stars

The White Stripes received generally positive reviews but only gained local attention on release. Norene Cashen of The Metro Times said the LP "serves better to remind us that [Detroit's] local identity has more options than a membership card to the latest cliché...or a one-way ticket to the coast." Much of the media feedback came two or three years after its initial release, following the duo's fame spreading beyond Detroit. It has sold 300,000 copies in the United States.

BBC DJ John Peel first spotted the album in a record shop and said, "I just liked the look of it and I looked at the titles – you develop an instinct, d'you know what I mean? And it looked like the sort of record I would like, so I took it out and I did like it, and started playing it." His endorsement was key in heightening the band's popularity in the UK.

Chris Handyside of AllMusic said of the album, "Jack White's voice is a singular, evocative combination of punk, metal, blues, and backwoods while his guitar work is grand and banging with just enough lyrical touches of slide and subtle solo work... Meg White balances out the fretwork and the fretting with methodical, spare, and booming cymbal, bass drum, and snare... All D.I.Y. punk-country-blues-metal singer-songwriting duos should sound this good."

== Track listing ==
All lyrics are written by Jack White, except where noted; all music is composed by Jack White and Meg White, except where noted.

No.	Title	Writer(s)	Length
1.	"Jimmy the Exploder"		2:29
2.	"Stop Breaking Down"	Robert Johnson	2:20
3.	"The Big Three Killed My Baby"		2:29
4.	"Suzy Lee"		3:21
5.	"Sugar Never Tasted So Good"		2:54
6.	"Wasting My Time"		2:13
7.	"Cannon"		2:30
8.	"Astro"		2:42
9.	"Broken Bricks"	Jack White, Stephen Gillis	1:51
10.	"When I Hear My Name"		1:54
11.	"Do"		3:05
12.	"Screwdriver"		3:14
13.	"One More Cup of Coffee"	Bob Dylan	3:13
14.	"Little People"		2:22
15.	"Slicker Drips"		1:30
16.	"St. James Infirmary Blues"	Traditional, credited to Joe Primrose	2:24
17.	"I Fought Piranhas"		3:07
Total length:			43:38

Japanese edition bonus tracks
No.	Title	Length
18.	"Let's Shake Hands"	2:01
19.	"Lafayette Blues"	2:15
Total length:		47:54

=== Notes ===
- The original 1999 vinyl release of the album features an alternate track listing, which excludes "The Big Three Killed My Baby", "Sugar Never Tasted So Good", and "One More Cup of Coffee".
- "Cannon" contains an interpolation of Son House's "John the Revelator".

== Personnel ==
Credits are adapted from the album's liner notes and single releases.

The White Stripes

- Jack White – vocals, guitar, piano, production, engineering (track 5)
- Meg White – drums

Additional personnel

- Johnny Walker – second slide guitar (tracks 4 and 17)
- Jim Diamond – co-production, engineering
- Jeff Meier – engineering (tracks 18 and 19)
- Ballistic – cover
- Ko Melina Zydeko – photography
- Heather White – photography

== Charts ==
Chart (2004)	Peak position
French Albums (SNEP)	159
UK Albums (Official Charts Company)	142

== Certifications ==
Region	Certification	Certified units/sales
United Kingdom (BPI)	Gold	100,000^{^}
^{^} Shipments figures based on certification alone.

== Release history ==
Region	Date	Label	Format	Catalog
United States	June 15, 1999	Sympathy for the Record Industry	LP album	SFTRI 577
United States	June 15, 1999	Sympathy for the Record Industry	Compact Disc	SFTRI 577
United Kingdom	November 26, 2001	XL Recordings	Compact Disc	XLCD 149
United Kingdom	November 26, 2001	XL Recordings	LP album	XLLP 149
United States	June 11, 2002	V2 Records	Compact Disc	63881-27131-2
Japan	March 19, 2003	V2 Records Japan	Compact Disc	V2CP 148
United States	November 30, 2010	Third Man Records	LP album	TMR-042

== Bibliography ==
- True, Everett (2004). White Stripes and the Sound of Mutant Blues. Omnibus Press. ISBN 978-0-85712-211-7.
- Handyside, Chris (2004). Fell in Love with a Band. St. Martin's Press. ISBN 9780312336189.
- Porter, Dick (2004). The White Stripes: 21st Century Blues. Plexus Publishing. ISBN 0 85965 350 1.
