= Mr David Viner =

English Musician

Mr David Viner is an English folk and blues musician from London, England, described by "Glorious Noise" online music magazine as "an accomplished guitarist, a roguish vocalist and a skillful lyricist".

In the early 2000s he was "adopted" by the Detroit garage scene, recording his eponymous debut album with members of the Soledad Brothers and Von Bondies.

Returning to London, he continued to record and release music, and toured extensively, including supporting the White Stripes on their last European tour, and opening for Dr John and Spiritualized.

Viner currently lives in Norfolk, where he grows organic heritage vegetables and keeps rare breed chickens.

== Discography ==
=== Albums ===
- Mr David Viner (Dim Mak records) 2003
- This Boy Don't Care (Loog) 2004
- Among The Rumours And The Rye (Loose) 2008
- Better In Than Out (self-released) 2011
- So Well Hid (Light & Liberty/Mauvaise Foi) 2016

=== Singles and EPs ===
- "Where The Posies Grow" – 7" vinyl, Loog records 2003
- "Long Gone Honey" / "Goblin In My Bread" – 7" vinyl, Loog 2004
- "Silence Is Gonna Break" – 7" vinyl, Fitzrovian Phonographic, 2006
- "Go Home" – Ambiguous Records, 2008
- "Pallet On Your Floor" – (with Deanne Iovan), 7" single, Mo Pop, 2008
- Beyond Belief EP – self-released CD and digital download, 2011
