= Under Blackpool Lights =

Video by The White Stripes
- Released: December 7, 2004
- Recorded: January 27, 2004 and January 28, 2004
- Venues: The Empress Ballroom (Blackpool, England)
- Genres: Punk blues, garage rock
- Label: Third Man
- Director: Dick Carruthers

Professional ratings
Review scores
Source	Rating
The A.V. Club	link
The Guardian	link

Under Blackpool Lights is the first official DVD released by the White Stripes. The DVD consists of 26 tracks recorded at The Empress Ballroom at the Winter Gardens in the English seaside resort of Blackpool on January 27 and 28, 2004, and directed by Dick Carruthers using super 8 film. Among these tracks, as with most White Stripes live performances, are several cover songs – such as "Take a Whiff on Me" (Lead Belly), "Outlaw Blues" (Bob Dylan), "Jack the Ripper" (Screaming Lord Sutch), "Jolene" (Dolly Parton), "Death Letter" (Son House), "Goin' Back to Memphis" (Soledad Brothers), and "De Ballit of de Boll Weevil" (Lead Belly).

== Background ==
The DVD's title comes from a moment during the performance in which Jack White addresses the audience:

I heard George Harrison say the Beatles used to go see Blackpool lights – what is that? A different place altogether? I'm in the right place at the wrong time? That's how I feel every day.

Martin Scorsese's concert film The Last Waltz (1978) was the reference point for Under Blackpool Lights as Jack did not want it to be like the typical MTV Films footage. The film was recorded on Super 8 cameras and 16 mm film. In discussing the DVD, Jack White recounted that he felt like a self-directed actor rather than himself and was deeply frustrated by his performance in the film. He felt that his guitar was discordant, that his effects did not come in on time, and that his movement was clumsy. He was highly critical of their performance, feeling they looked "boring and flat" and also pointed out that for Meg White, the audience could immediately notice any mistake she made. Jack also felt intimidated by the audience, fearing that if he told a joke no one would laugh, and that he was so consumed by the songs–which he felt were the film's saving grace–that he forgot to smile. A scene which displayed how Jack uses his wah-wah pedal was removed, at his request, though nothing else was edited out to preserve the essence of the film.

== Track listing ==
1. "When I Hear My Name"
2. "Black Math"
3. "Dead Leaves and the Dirty Ground"
4. "I Think I Smell a Rat"
5. "Take a Whiff on Me" (and part of "Cannon")
6. "Astro"
7. "Outlaw Blues"
8. "Jack the Ripper"
9. "Jolene"
10. "Hotel Yorba"
11. "Death Letter"/"Grinnin' In Your Face"
12. "Do"
13. "The Hardest Button to Button"
14. "Truth Doesn't Make a Noise"
15. "The Big Three Killed My Baby"
16. "Wasting My Time"
17. "You're Pretty Good Looking (For a Girl)"
18. "Hello Operator"
19. "Apple Blossom"
20. "Ball and Biscuit"
21. "Let's Shake Hands"
22. "I Fought Piranhas"
23. "Let's Build a Home"
24. "Goin' Back to Memphis"
25. "Seven Nation Army"
26. "De Ballit of de Boll Weevil"

== Personnel ==
- Jack White – vocals, guitar, piano
- Meg White – drums
