= Cooling board =

Funeral preparation platform

A cooling board was a perforated wooden platform on which a dead body would be temporarily stored and prepared for a funeral. Ice was placed beneath it to keep the body chilled, slowing the decomposition process. Holes in the cooling board, which could be made of cane latticework rather than a solid wooden plank, allowed blood and other fluids to drain from the body. It could also be used to display the body for a viewing if the casket was not delivered in time.

Metal embalming tables replaced cooling boards as modern refrigeration became available.

In Appalachian history, cooling boards were used in barns during the winter to keep the body cool until the ground was softened to dig a grave.

It was common to even see ice box cooling boards displayed in windows or travel salesman to smaller towns to show the way to embalm correctly.

After a body was washed, dressed and cooled the body could be placed on a cooling board or a door suspended over two chairs or blocks. Some families used the dining room table or even a bed if the family member did not die there.

The cooling board is referred to in a number of blues songs, such as "Cooling Board Blues" by Blind Willie McTell.

The undertaker, funeral director as we would call them today, would travel to the home where the corpse would be ready for embalming. At times, families would request that the corpse not be embalmed. At this time, the undertaker would bring a cooling board or corpse cooler to assist with lowering the body temperature to slow the decaying process.

Cooling boards have been used for another purpose, autopsies. Sometimes a cooling board would be referred to as an autopsy board. Autopsies have been known to take place within the home as well.

Son House also makes a reference to a cooling board in his "Death Letter".

So, I grabbed up my suitcase, and took off down the road.
When I got there she was layin on a coolin' board.

A cooling board is also found in a song, "Thank You, Master (For My Soul)", by Donnie Hathaway:

'cause the walls of my room was not the walls of my grave
my bed was not my cooling board (y'all don't know what i'm talkin' 'bout)

One more reference to cooling boards is made in the Tyler Childers song "Whitehouse Road".

"I've got people tryna tell me, "Red, keep this livin' and you'll wind up dead"
"Cast your troubles on the Lord of lords, wind up layin' on a coolin' board"

Benjamin B. French witnessed Abraham Lincoln's remains, after transfer from the Peterson House to the White House, being "taken from the box in which they were enclosed, all limp and warm, and laid upon the floor, and then stretched upon the cooling board."
