= Italy Records =

- Founded: 1997
- Founder: Dave Buick
- Genre: Garage punk, garage rock, rock & roll
- Country of origin: U.S.
- Location: Detroit, Michigan
- Official website: http://scienceorfact.com/

Italy Records is an independent record label founded in Detroit, Michigan in 1997, by self-confessed "record geek" Dave Buick. (See 1997 in music.) The label released its first 7" by Rocket 455 on October 31, 1997. shortly after Buick released a single by the Dirtys. Dirtys lead singer Joe Burdick claimed this was the reason Buick founded Italy Records in the first place. The label went on to release the notable 7"s from Detroit rock & roll bands, from the garage rock scene including the first two 7"s by The White Stripes (Let's Shake Hands and Lafayette Blues), the debut release from the Soledad Brothers ("Soledad), and the first single from The Greenhornes (Stayed Up Last Night). In its first incarnation, Italy Records released eleven 45 rpm singles and a single mini-LP called Hentch-Forth by The Hentchmen with Jack White of The White Stripes. Out of its twelve releases, Jack White featured in the production or performing of at least six.

Italy's supposed last release was Whirlwind Heat's Glaxefusion 7" in 2000. But in 2007, the Italy label was revived with a single from very popular Detroit band The Go. Buick and The Hentchmen also re-released the Hentch-Forth album, this time in CD format (re-titled Hentch-Forth.Five) and digitally on iTunes.

== Discography ==
Cat No.	Band	Title
IR-001	Rocket 455	Ain't Right Girl
IR-002	The Dirtys	It Ain't Easy
IR-003	The White Stripes	Let's Shake Hands
IR-004	The Hentchmen	Some Other Guy (feat. Jack White)
IR-005	Fells	Close Your Eyes
IR-006	The White Stripes	Lafayette Blues
IR-007	Soledad Brothers	Soledad
IR-008	The Hentchmen	Hentch-forth
IR-009	The Greenhornes	Stayed Up Last Night
IR-010	Clone Defects	Scissors Chop
IR-011	Clone Defects]]	Lizard Boy
IR-012	Whirlwind Heat	Glaxefusion
IR-013	The Go	You Go Banging On
IR-014	The Go	Christmas on the Moon
IR-016	F'KE BLOOD	Water Wings
IR-017	Silverghost	So Lost Now
IR-018	Magic Shop	Windy Days
IR-019	Terrible Twos	Grey Ghost Street EP
IR-020	The Go	Tracking the Trail of the Haunted Beat LP
IR-021	Druid Perfume	Goat Skin Glue EP
IR-022	The Hentchmen	Claude's Remains
IR-023	Gardens	In Novelty Land
IR-024	Lee Marvin Computer Arm	Delta Water
IR-025	Druid Perfume	Other Worlds
IR-026	Johnny Ill Band	Cars
IR-028	Mirrortwin	Kelly & Fabrizio

== See also ==
- List of record labels
