= M. Wartella =

American cartoonist (born 1976)

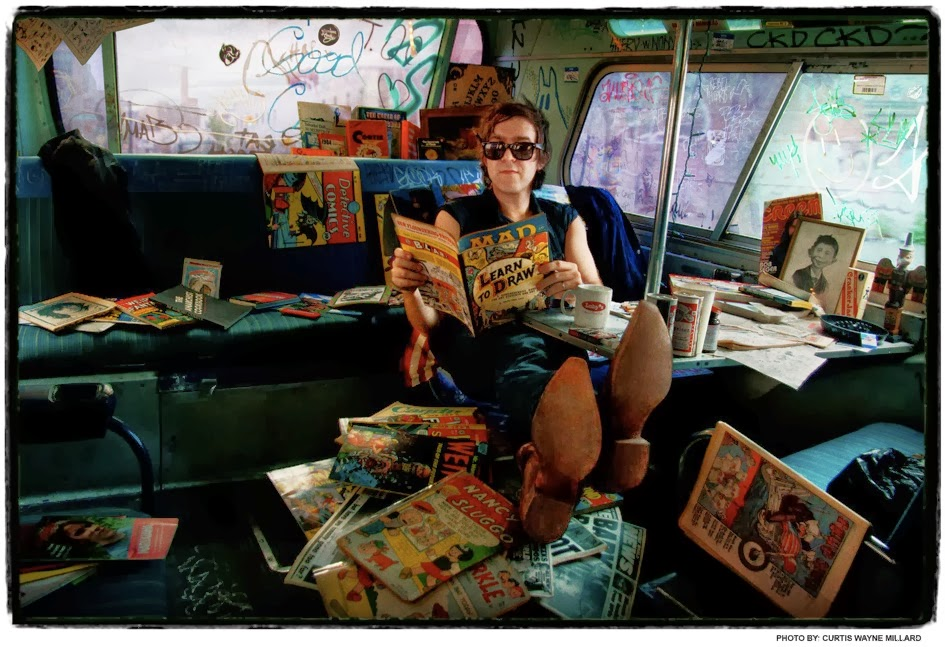
- Born: August 19, 1976 (age 50)
- Occupations: Cartoonist, animator
- Years active: 1994–present

Michael M. Wartella (born August 19, 1976) is an American underground cartoonist, animator, writer and director based in New York City, generally publishing under the name M. Wartella or just Wartella. He is best known for his work in The Village Voice and on Cartoon Network's MAD.

He is the founder of Brooklyn's Dream Factory Animation, a boutique studio specializing in the production of animated shorts for corporate and indie clients.

== Career ==
=== Print ===
According to his 2013 autobiography, Strip Show: 25 Years of Comix, Controversy & Copyright Infringement, Wartella began his professional career at age ten producing a weekly comic strip called Clubhouse Kids for a local newspaper, which ran for two years during 1986–1987.

Later, while a student at The University of Virginia, Wartella created the absurdist art comic Ackxhpæz (1994–1996) which he then expanded and nationally self-syndicated to alternative weekly newspapers (as "Nuts") from 1998 to 2000. The humor in many of the cartoons was controversial as exemplified in a 1999 comic about the Columbine High School massacre which prompted an outcry when it was published in Denver.

From 2007 to 2009, Wartella's intricate single-panel "reportorial" cartoons began appearing regularly in The Village Voice, where he is still listed as an honorary contributor.

Wartella's sequential comics have appeared in Eisner and Harvey Award nominated anthologies from DC Comics and Fantagraphics Books and in magazines including Andy Warhol's Interview and Spin. His illustrations have primarily appeared in "underground" publications including Arthur, Pop Smear, and he was the creator of the infamously rare scratch-off cover of Vice Magazine.

Wartella has also contributed several titles and paintings to the "all-new" series of Wacky Packages trading cards from Topps, and created similar product parody spoofs for Nickelodeon Magazine in the 2000s (decade).

Wartella also did new artwork that appears on the cover of the re-launched MAD Magazine #6 (April 2019) featuring miniature Alfred E. Neumans in an M.C. Escher style cubist background.

=== Animation ===
Wartella is a noted animator and director. Considered a pioneer of online animation, Wartella was among the earliest to use the animated .gif format to create story-driven independent animation. In 1998, The New York Times described his early animated web short The Dinky Dog Archive as "the Steamboat Willie of the internet".

In the 2000s (decade), Wartella was an artistic contributor to several animated television shows including MTV2's cult hit Wonder Showzen (2005–2006), and Adult Swim's series Superjail! (2008–2009) and Xavier: Renegade Angel (2007–2009).

In 2013, Wartella opened his own full-service production studio, Dream Factory Animation, in Brooklyn NY which has conceived, developed and produced animated programming for clients including Condé Nast, Radical Media, The Creative Agency and Warner Bros.

From 2010 to 2013, he created nearly 300 hand-drawn animated shorts for Cartoon Network's MAD, where his work was featured in every episode during four seasons.

=== Music videos ===
As of 2022, Wartella has directed several music videos combining live action and animation for musical acts including Ozzy Osbourne, King Tuff and The White Stripes. Wartella's music videos have received accolades from Blender magazine and Stereogum.

Title	Year	Artist	Label	Role
"Sun Medallion"	2013	King Tuff	Burger Records	Director
"Waterfall"	2014	Ex Hex	Merge Records	Director
"Physical Emotions"	2014	Black Bananas	Drag City	Director
"Madness"	2015	King Tuff	Sub Pop	Director
"Rainbow Shiner"	2019	Ex Hex	Merge Records	Director
"Richest Man"	2020	Brendan Benson	Third Man Records	Director
"Apple Blossom"	2020	The White Stripes	Sony Legacy	Director
"Let's Shake Hands"	2020	The White Stripes	Sony Legacy	Director
"Patient Number 9"	2022	Ozzy Osbourne	Epic Records	Director (with Todd McFarlane)
"Black Math"	2023	The White Stripes	Sony Legacy	Director

== Bibliography ==
- Wartella's STRIP SHOW: 25 Years of Comix, Controversy & Copyright Infringement by Wartella, (Burger Records, 2013)
- Found: Requiem for a Paper Bag (cover) by Davy Rothbart, (Fireside, 2009 ISBN 978-1-4165-6054-8)
- Chew on This (cover), by Schlosser/Wilson, (Houghton Mifflin, 2006)
- Hotwire Comix & Capers, ed. by Glenn Head, (Fantagraphics Books, 2006)
- Bizarro World, ed. by Joey Cavalieri, (DC Comics, 2005)
