= Hand Springs =

1999 single by The White Stripes and The Dirtbombs

"Hand Springs/Cedar Point '76"

Single by the White Stripes and the Dirtbombs
- Released: 2000
- Recorded: September 9, 1999
- Genre: Garage rock; punk rock
- Length: 5:10
- Label: Extra-Ball
- Producer: Jack White

The White Stripes singles chronology
"The Big Three Killed My Baby" (1998)	"Hand Springs/Cedar Point '76" (2000)	"Hello Operator" (2000)

The Dirtbombs singles chronology
"Stuck Under My Shoe" (1998)	"Cedar Point '76" (1999)	"Headlights On" (2000)

"Hand Springs/Cedar Point '76" is a split 7" single released in 2000 by Detroit garage rock bands the White Stripes and the Dirtbombs. The White Stripes song "Hand Springs" is on the A-side and "Cedar Point '76" by the Dirtbombs is on the B-side. Only 2,000 copies were pressed and included free with the pinball fanzine Multiball.

"Hand Springs" was later featured on the 2000 compilation album Hot Pinball Rock, Vol. 1. Also, many copies of the White Blood Cells album were packaged with a bonus DVD that included audio tracks of "Hand Springs" (as well as "Lafayette Blues").

The single was packaged with another one track single, "Red Death at 6:14", as its B-side for Record Store Day 2012.

== Track listing ==
No.	Title	Writer(s)	Length
1.	"Hand Springs"	Jack White, Meg White	2:57
2.	"Cedar Point '76"	Mick Collins, Andrew James Diamond	2:13
