= Candy Cane Children =

Single by the White Stripes
- Released: November 2002
- Recorded: 1998 and 2002 (Note: The liner notes say it was recorded in those two years respectively.) (Third Man Studios)
- Genre: Garage rock, Christmas music
- Length: 2:28
- Label: XL Recordings, V2
- Composers: Jack White, Meg White
- Lyricist: Jack White
- Producer: Jack White

The White Stripes singles chronology
"Red Death at 6:14" (2002)	"Candy Cane Children" (2002)	"Seven Nation Army" (2003)

"Candy Cane Children" (Note: Titled "Merry Christmas From The White Stripes" on music streaming services) is a single by the American garage rock band the White Stripes. Released in late November 2002, this Christmas song is featured on the independent holiday-themed compilation Surprise Package Volume 2, released in 1998. The album title is a reference to die-hard fans of the White Stripes, who are called "Candy Cane Children".

On the 7" vinyl record there are inscriptions on Side A and Side B. Side A reads: "Whammy=Santa Voice". Side B reads: "Ghosts in the background".

== Track listing ==
1. "Candy Cane Children"
2. "The Reading of the Story of the Magi"
3. "The Singing of Silent Night"

=== Digital track listing ===
1. "Candy Cane Children"
2. "Story of the Magi / Silent Night"
