= De Stijl (album) =

Studio album by the White Stripes
- Released: June 20, 2000
- Recorded: 2000 (Note: The album's liner notes say it was recorded at the "turn of the century", though the exact months are unknown as The White Stripes did not use a set recording schedule for the album.)
- Studios: Third Man Studio (Note: Although the liner notes credit the recording location as Third Man Studios, the album was actually recorded in the living room of Jack and Meg's home rather than any official recording studio. At the time it was Jack's upholstery studio of the same name.) (Detroit, Michigan)
- Genres: Punk blues; alternative rock; garage rock; blues rock
- Length: 37:31
- Label: Sympathy for the Record Industry
- Producer: Jack White

The White Stripes chronology
The White Stripes (1999)	De Stijl (2000)	White Blood Cells (2001)

Singles from De Stijl
- 1. "Hello Operator" Released: May 2000

De Stijl (Dutch pronunciation: [də stɛil]) is the second studio album by the American rock duo the White Stripes, independently released by the label Sympathy for the Record Industry on June 20, 2000. It was conceived before band members Jack White and Meg White divorced, who nonetheless continued working together and presented themselves as siblings. Produced by Jack and recorded on an 8-track analog tape in their living room, the album takes inspiration from the art movement of the same name and features the band's early blues-inspired sound.

De Stijl sold moderately upon release but received generally positive reviews from critics. The album has gained renewed attention and peaked at 38 on Billboard's Independent Albums chart in 2002. It was certified gold by the British Phonographic Industry (BPI) and included on NME's list of "The 500 Greatest Albums of All Time" in 2013.

== Background and recording ==
A lot of my fans, their favorite record of mine, I'm told, is the second White Stripes album De Stijl [...] I engineered it, produced it, recorded it, and performed it all in that spot. [...] Something came out of me doing all that stuff instead of collaborating with an engineer. So maybe more of that can happen now that I have my own place, I can get some of that vibe that happened on this record, because I don't know what it was that sounded so great to them. You never know. You're just kind of always searching for that.

— Jack on recording De Stijl at home

The White Stripes band members Jack and Meg divorced in March 2000, however, Meg insisted that they continue working together. Despite their divorce, they continued living together. (Note: They lived together until mid-2003, by which point Jack and later Meg moved to different homes in the neighborhood of Indian Village. They still referred to it as "our" house as of interviews in 2003 and 2004. Their fifth album, Get Behind Me Satan, was also recorded in his next home.) De Stijl was recorded in their living room, which was an environment that was more "comfortable" for them without "studio influence", exclusively using a Tascam 8-track analog tape machine and "broken, pieces of junk" Shure SM58 microphones. In April 1999, when the White Stripes opened for Compulsive Gamblers at the Magic Stick venue in Detroit, Michigan, Jack asked band member Jack Yarber if he would sell him his red-and-white Airline guitar, to which Yarber obliged as he had found a more sophisticated model. This guitar was used on De Stijl (as well as another guitar that Jack did not want to disclose) and would go on to become Jack's trademark in the White Stripes. (Note: By November 2003, the original Airline guitar had been in a derelict condition onstage and a fan contacted Jack to give him a replacement, which he used from then on.)

The album was recorded at home in part to save money on studio costs and not to replicate the eponymous debut album. At the time, Jack liked "not having to argue with an engineer"; not having the pressure of time, cost, and the studio; and seemed to think their recording at home was efficient. Jack later considered recording De Stijl at home a mistake, due to the distractions of domestic life, (Note: For instance, during takes the phone would ring, people would knock on the door, etc.) and preferred the recording conditions of the subsequent albums, White Blood Cells (2001) and Elephant (2003). He would also bring his guitar to work and would become distracted by the instrument and songwriting instead of working, considering that a mistake as well. Songs were recorded sporadically and when they had time, resulting in a months-long process. In spite of it all, he acknowledges its homemade, self-produced recording made it a fan favorite, though he doesn't know what "sounded so great to them." He also acknowledged that home provided "total freedom" for the White Stripes and a space in which songs like the album's ninth track, "A Boy's Best Friend", could be created. Jack overdubbed the piano and acoustic guitar on the album in an attempt to experiment with the differences between live performance and the studio recording, as people assumed he wasn't capable of playing piano songs live, though in hindsight he was dissatisfied with it and believes it was "too much." Mixing was done at Ghetto Recorders by Jack and Jim Diamond, and the album would be completed in spring 2000.

De Stijl takes its name from the De Stijl ("the style" in English) art movement, which included the painter Piet Mondrian. Jack had been an admirer of the style for some time, especially of furniture designer Gerrit Rietveld, who designed the Rietveld Schröder House which the band had visited. Jack stated, "I thought we'd call the album De Stijl because it broke the art form down to its simplest parts [...]. It was a question of how simple should The White Stripes be, what's out of bounds for us, and what are we supposed to be doing with this band?" In addition to his love for the art movement, Jack felt the title did not apply to either their debut album or White Blood Cells because of the way they approached the recording. The title was also inspired by Love's second album Da Capo (1966). William S. Burroughs's experimental album Break Through in Grey Room (1986) was a reference point for creating an album with the barest minimum of resources. Jack later sampled part of it on one of his solo albums, Fear of the Dawn (2022). He also used Lead Belly as inspiration, who primarily performed only with acoustic guitar and vocals.

Its cover art sets Jack and Meg against an abstract background of rectangles and lines in red, black and white, and utilizes common elements from the aesthetics of its namesake. Meg has said she disliked her outfit on the cover and "[didn't] know what [she] was thinking" by wearing it, finding subsequent ones better.

De Stijl was dedicated to both Rietveld and Blind Willie McTell. The dedication to McTell came from Jack's realization that the beginning of McTell's music career and that of other country bluesmen coextended with the birth of the De Stijl movement; this led to the misconception that both Jack and Meg were art students, although Jack stated that he would have attended art school had he been able to afford it.

Johnny Walker of the Soledad Brothers, who worked with the band on their debut album, helped Jack wire a peppermint-striped Triple Tremolo amplifier, of which according to the liner notes, "The cabinet contains three types of Leslie revolving speakers. The peppermint in the viewing window is mounted on a revolving speaker baffle and spins at both slow and fast speeds." The amplifier was intended to be taken on tour, however at 350 lbs. it was too heavy to do so and only used in the White Stripes' television appearance on the Late Show with David Letterman in 2002. The back cover of the "Hello Operator / Jolene" vinyl shows Meg sitting cross-legged on top of it and De Stijl's sleeve shows Jack sitting next to it.

== Music and lyrics ==
De Stijl features the band's early blues-inspired sound, which was prominent on their self-titled debut album. Tom Breihan of Stereogum said the album showcased delta blues, hard and psychedelic rock influences, and Lizzy Goodman of NPR similarly noted its "camp" blues sound.

On February 5, 2008, Canadian media reported that former Radio-Canada host Dominique Payette filed a lawsuit against the White Stripes for using a nine-second clip of her interview with a little girl at the beginning of "Jumble, Jumble". She demanded $70,000 in damages and the removal of the album from store shelves. The dispute was settled out of court.

== Songs ==
"It can't be anything but the state of the world now. The state of the internet now, the state of pop culture now, and how fragile and disposable truth has become. But that's my guess. It wasn't sitting down and intending to say that. It just comes out, and you try to get out of the way of it."

— Jack on revisiting the themes of "Truth Doesn't Make a Noise".

"You're Pretty Good Looking (For a Girl)", a bubblegum pop song, was inspired by the songwriting process of Michael Jackson, and came about spontaneously while Jack was driving one day; he finished the song when he got home by adding the melody, guitar, and drums.

"Hello Operator" was the only single on the album,. The song was promoted by influential British radio DJ John Peel, despite not having been released in the United Kingdom at the time. Peel owned his own copy, having purchased it a record store in the Netherlands. Like "The Big Three Killed My Baby" critiqued the auto industry, "Hello Operator" was written in critique of phone companies that rip people off. The song's B-side, a cover of Dolly Parton's "Jolene", was released in 2004 via its live recording at a concert in Blackpool, England, and reached number one on the UK independent music chart. Parton appreciates their rendition among others. As a solo performer, Jack considers the cover exclusively a White Stripes staple and "wouldn't bother touching it again." "Jolene" was chosen to cover because, unlike "Delta Dawn" (famously performed by Tanya Tucker), it was one of the few songs in the genre that both Jack and Meg mutually liked.

The album's third track, "Little Bird" was heavily inspired by Led Zeppelin. It was created out of Jack's love for performing slide guitar.

"Apple Blossom" debuted on a local Detroit Public Television segment called Backstage Pass and appeared in the Quentin Tarantino film The Hateful Eight (2015).

"I'm Bound to Pack It Up" is a country song depicting a break-up in which the narrator moves out of the home. The studio version of song does not feature Meg's drums.

"Death Letter" is a cover of song by Son House, an artist whom Jack considers to be his idol. House's family earned significant royalty checks and personally thanked him for covering the song. During the recording of the song, a drunken man wandered into the home because he heard them playing and interrupted them, petrifying Meg. Jack recounted, "When you record under that kind of duress in Detroit, I think you really learn a lot about constriction." On the subject of blues motifs, Meg said, "Something about Son House's voice was so haunting. There's something that you didn't hear in other music that I heard in him the first time I listened to it." When asked if they bonded over House's music when they met, Jack said he didn't remember but the record was most likely around them. It was one of the top three most performed songs by The White Stripes during their career, and was performed at the 46th Annual Grammy Awards.

"Sister, Do You Know My Name?" and "A Boy's Best Friend" were two songs that Jack particularly liked on the album, but were rarely performed live due to their slow-burning nature ("A Boy's Best Friend" was possibly never performed live). He deemed the latter "almost too sad, too quiet, [and] too slow," but an emotional progression from the debut album. They are about the fantasy of having a close-knit group of friends to spend time with as he struggled to make friends as a child. "Sister, Do You Know My Name?" was used as background music during a scene in the band's documentary Under Great White Northern Lights (2009). Both songs contain slide guitar work.

"Truth Doesn't Make a Noise" was written c. 1999, and was based on a phrase that kept running through his mind. The theme would also go on to inspire Jack's 2024 solo album No Name.

"Let's Build a Home" features a recording of Jack as a child in the intro reciting a nursery rhyme for his mother and one of his brothers. The song was performed on Late Night with Conan O'Brien in 2003. Live performances frequently interpolated "Goin' Back to Memphis" by Henry and June.

"Jumble, Jumble"'s intro contains audio of Canadian radio host Dominique Payette speaking to a child talking about "the first time" (within the context of human sexuality). Payette found this to be a violation of the child's privacy under Québec laws and sued the band. They settled out of court.

The song "Why Can't You Be Nicer to Me?" appeared on The Simpsons in 2010, used in the episode "Judge Me Tender". It was one of the first songs they ever performed, in August 1997, a month after their formation.

"Your Southern Can Is Mine", a cover of a song by Blind Willie McTell, recounts relentless domestic violence against the narrator's partner; Jack perceived the meaning of the title in various ways and dedicated the album to McTell, albeit he still condemned the themes of violence against women. The song was chosen to cover instead of "sweet heartbreak number," because the machismo of the time as well as Jack's "dream of being a black man in the '30s [which] is not going to happen." Jack made a parallel between the music of male blues artists like Charley Patton and the personalities of modern "arrogant guy[s] at the bar" who had no problem attracting women over "nice guy[s] sitting in the corner." Meg opined that scoundrels are "more entertaining, just not [better] in the long term." Back then, "music was a form of communication" and Meg concurred "there's been a loss of culture." Meg sings background vocals on the chorus and it was the first time she sang on a White Stripes track, which was "fun" for them. The song was performed on their first ever American national television appearance (The Late Late Show in 2001) and on Radio New Zealand during the band's first international tour, among other occasions.

== Release and reception ==
Professional ratings
Review scores
Source	Rating
AllMusic	4.5/5 stars
The Boston Phoenix	3/4 stars
NME	8/10
Pitchfork	9.1/10
Rolling Stone	3.5/5 stars
The Rolling Stone Album Guide	4/5 stars
Stylus Magazine	A−

I still think De Stijl is one of the most important things I’ve ever done.

— Jack on the album's impact

De Stijl was released on June 20, 2000, through the Sympathy for the Record Industry label. A re-issued vinyl LP version of the record was pressed at United Record Pressing in Nashville, Tennessee and mastered all-analog from the original master tapes. The album was re-issued again for its 20th anniversary.

De Stijl earned positive reviews from critics, who noted its simplicity, and fusion of blues and "scuzzy garage rock." Heather Phares of AllMusic said that "As distinctive as it is diverse, De Stijl blends the Stripes' arty leanings with enough rock muscle to back up the band's ambitions." William Bowers of Pitchfork wrote that the album "contained thunderous, honky-soulful, lacerating pop at various stages of evolution." Jenny Eliscu of Rolling Stone had seen The White Stripes open for Sleater-Kinney and asked the magazine to write a review of De Stijl. In her review, she called it "feisty and clever" and praised the drumming, guitar and vocal performances, stating that "like everything about the White Stripes, [De Stijl] proves that you don't need bombast to make a blues explosion." She later added them to the magazine's "10 Bands to Watch in 2001" article which contributed to a bidding war by major labels. Ann Powers of the New York Times described the album as "what many hip rock fans consider real music."

De Stijl was a sleeper hit, earning a following after the White Stripes began to grow popular outside of Detroit and reaching number 38 on the Billboard Independent Albums chart in 2002. It has since been considered a cult classic. NME included it on their "500 Greatest Albums of All Time" list in 2013. The media's response strongly influenced the direction of White Blood Cells, leading Jack to move away from creating blues music on that album.

== De Stijl tour ==
Around the same time as the album's release, the band had retained a booking agent based out of San Francisco, California named Dave Kaplan. The White Stripes had previously been working with another agent but were dissatisfied with his services as they were only being booked as openers by promoters who assumed they were a gimmick or that they should only be booked alongside other duos, bassless bands, or bands with female drummers. They were introduced to Kaplan by way of Bantam Rooster's Tom Potter. Kaplan had established his own agency and began working with many Detroit rock bands, from the aforementioned to The Dirtbombs, The Detroit Cobras, Electric Six, and more. Outside of the Midwest, the White Stripes had been gaining a burgeoning following in San Francisco, California, Portland, Oregon, and Asheville, North Carolina. Jack worked on songwriting during the tour to keep him occupied as Meg was not the type of person who enjoyed joking around during their downtime like he did.

The De Stijl tour began in June 2000. After the album's release party in Ferndale, Michigan, the tour went to Madison, Wisconsin and continued west to Minneapolis and Moorhead, Minnesota. While en route to their stop in Missoula, Montana, the band listened to Honky Tonk Girl: The Loretta Lynn Collection (1994), and had approximately 200 CDs to keep them entertained while traveling on tour. The next stop was Seattle, Washington's Sit & Spin for the first of two appearances during the tour. They also performed at Seattle's Fallout Records before heading south to Los Angeles, California to perform at Spaceland; they were booked to play at the same time as Weezer (who used a pseudonym), but the band ended up opening for them instead of headlining as they were scheduled to after the latter announced a surprise show there the same night. (Note: Rivers Cuomo inadvertently left "Weezer" on the flyer, which gave the surprise away to fans a week prior.) While still in the Los Angeles area, they performed in Signal Hill, California before heading east to the Great Plains to perform in Lawrence, Kansas. Back in the Midwest, they performed in Champaign, Illinois and Chicago.

Two weeks later, back in their home state, they performed in Ann Arbor, Michigan and a month later at the Magic Stick venue in Detroit. Returning to Madison, in September, they began their string of dates opening for Olympia, Washington-based rock band Sleater-Kinney, which piqued the attention of Rolling Stone reporter Jenny Eliscu. They returned to Chicago and continued southesast to Newport, Kentucky. They headed north to Oberlin, Ohio and Columbus, Ohio. Further north, they performed in Toronto, Ontario and Montreal, Québec. Returning to the United States, they performed in Rochester, New York and went to New England to perform in Boston and Cambridge, Massachusetts. Returning to New York, they performed at New York City's Mercury Lounge and Bowery Ballroom. They continued south to Philadelphia, Pennsylvania and Washington, D.C.. Their concert in Asheville, North Carolina was "the best show [they] ever did" up to that point in their career, according to Jack, who described it as a "happy experience."

A month later, back in Detroit, they performed at the Gold Dollar for two nights before commencing their first international tour of Japan, New Zealand, and Australia. Returning to the United States in mid-November, they performed at San Francisco's Amoeba Music before returning to Seattle's Sit & Spin venue, during which they performed an unreleased song called "Back To School", though it was never performed again. They once again returned to San Francisco, and once again returned to Los Angeles's Spaceland venue, where Meg did not perform on her peppermint-emblazoned drum set but rather on a borrowed one from Riverside, California band The Bellrays (as such their own logo was displayed). They continued south to San Diego, California and later that week yet again returned to Madison and Chicago. Back in Wisconsin, they performed in Milwaukee and came home for New Years' Eve to perform at the Magic Stick, where Meg sang solo in concert for the first time.

The next year, in February, they went to Memphis, Tennessee to record their third album, White Blood Cells. Later that month they went southeast to Pittsburgh, Pennsylvania; east to Baltimore, Maryland; south, returning to Washington, D.C.; north to Hoboken, New Jersey; continuing to North Bennington, Vermont; then south to Providence, Rhode Island. They returned to Cambridge, Massachusetts and Philadelphia; returned to New York City's Bowery Ballroom and returned to Los Angeles's Spaceland for the third time. Staying in Los Angeles County, they performed at Pomona College in Claremont, California then returned to San Francisco for the third time on this tour. They returned to Columbus, Ohio and Newport, Kentucky before going to Austin, Texas to perform at the SXSW festival. They went to Chicago for the fourth time on this tour and performed at the Magic Stick in Detroit again. They headed east to Athens, Ohio; south to Louisville, Kentucky; returned to Ohio to perform in Toledo; and performed in Kalamazoo, Michigan. The tour ended in San Francisco. After almost a hundred shows that year, Jack and Meg quit their day jobs to do music full time, though lamented the loss of free time.

== First international tour ==
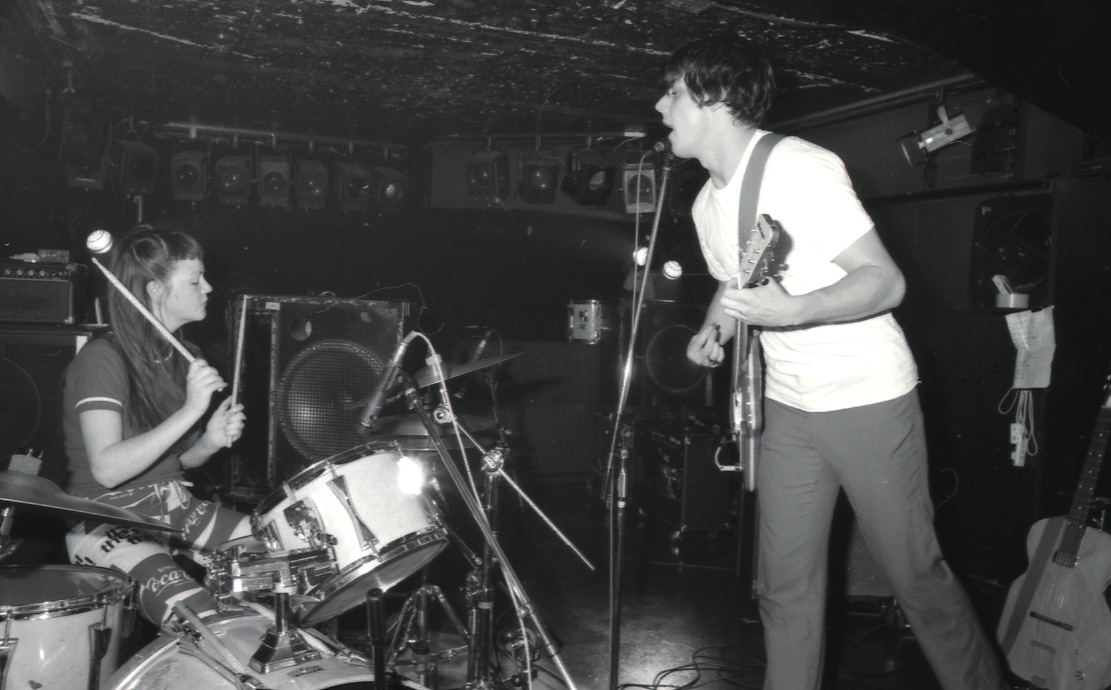
The White Stripes at Club Shinjuku Jam, Tokyo in 2000, where they played to an audience of 10–20 people in their first Japanese tour.

Some time after the release of their eponymous debut album, a New Zealand tour manager named John Baker came across "Jimmy the Exploder" and "The Big Three Killed My Baby" playing at a party in Melbourne, Australia and was intrigued by Jack's singing voice and the simple instrumentation of the music. A party-goer gave Baker basic information about the band and he took a mental note of it. In searching for New Orleans-based musician Quintron, Baker found out that he and The White Stripes had the same booking agent: Dave Kaplan. Interested in booking them for an Oceanic tour, he contacted Kaplan, who said he only worked with the band in the United States, so Baker would need to handle that tour himself. While Jack and Meg White were at home rehearsing one night, Baker called to discuss the opportunity, but they assumed he was joking. Weeks later, Baker tenaciously managed to track Jack down during a tour stop in Denver, Colorado and called the bar–all the way from Auckland, New Zealand–to speak to him again about touring; although Jack was still incredulous, Baker convinced them by personally offering to pay for the flight and in the meantime Jack got a passport. Baker financed the flights with a friend, Amber Easby, who would go on to manage the merchandise for the band's tours throughout their career. At their stop in Auckland, Jack also performed a solo acoustic set. The White Stripes "loved" New Zealand after their first trip, for which Jack said, "When we get there I never want to leave." Jack also observed that New Zealand felt no different than the United States.

Baker arranged for them to tour New Zealand and Australia with a brief stopover in Japan beforehand, which was the first international experience for them. They were scheduled for their first television and radio appearances. Their Australian concerts took place in Melbourne. After a modestly successful tour, Baker was asked to be their tour manager permanently.

== Diamond lawsuit ==
In October 2004, music producer Jim Diamond sued the White Stripes, alleging, among other things, that he was owed royalties for his work on their first two albums. The White Stripes countersued and in June 2006, a jury ruled in favor of them.

== Track listing ==
All lyrics are written by Jack White, except where noted; all music is composed by Jack White and Meg White, except where noted.

No.	Title	Writer(s)	Length
1.	"You're Pretty Good Looking (For a Girl)"		1:49
2.	"Hello Operator"		2:36
3.	"Little Bird"		3:06
4.	"Apple Blossom"		2:13
5.	"I'm Bound to Pack It Up"		3:09
6.	"Death Letter"	Eddie James "Son" House	4:29
7.	"Sister, Do You Know My Name?"		2:52
8.	"Truth Doesn't Make a Noise"		3:14
9.	"A Boy's Best Friend"		4:22
10.	"Let's Build a Home"		1:58
11.	"Jumble, Jumble"		1:53
12.	"Why Can't You Be Nicer to Me?"		3:22
13.	"Your Southern Can Is Mine"	William Samuel "Blind Willie" McTell	2:29
Total length:			37:31

Japanese edition bonus track
No.	Title	Length
14.	"Red Death at 6:14"

== Personnel ==
Credits are adapted from the album's liner notes.

The White Stripes

- Jack White – vocals, guitar, piano (tracks 4, 8 and 9), double bass (track 5); production, engineering, mixing, cover concept
- Meg White – drums, tambourine (track 9), shaker & floor tom (track 5); cover concept

Additional personnel

- John Szymanski – harmonica (track 2)
- Paul Henry Ossy – violin (track 5), electric violin (track 12)
- Jim Diamond – mixing
- Artes Graficos Por Cholomite! – layout
- E Wolf – photography

== Charts ==
Chart (2004–05)	Peak position
French Albums (SNEP)	164
UK Albums (Official Charts Company)	137
US Independent Albums (Billboard)	38

== Certifications ==
Region	Certification	Certified units/sales
United Kingdom (BPI)	Gold	100,000^{^}
United States	—	366,000
^{^} Shipments figures based on certification alone.

== Bibliography ==
- True, Everett (2004). The White Stripes and the Sound of Mutant Blues. Omnibus Press. ISBN 978-0-85712-211-7.
- Porter, Dick (2004). The White Stripes: 21st Century Blues. Plexus Publishing. ISBN 0 85965 350 1.
- Goodman, Lizzy (2017). Meet Me in the Bathroom. Harper Collins. ISBN 978-0-06-223309-7.
