= We're Going to Be Friends =

Promotional single by the White Stripes

from the album White Blood Cells
- Released: 2002
- Recorded: February 2001
- Studio: Easley-McCain Recording, Memphis, Tennessee
- Genre: Folk; children’s music; twee pop
- Length: 2:28
- Label: V2 Records
- Composers: Jack White, Meg White
- Lyricist: Jack White
- Producer: Jack White

The White Stripes singles chronology
"Dead Leaves and the Dirty Ground" (2002)	"We're Going to Be Friends" (2002)	"Red Death at 6:14" (2002)

Music video
- "We're Going to Be Friends" on YouTube

Audio sample
- file; help

"We're Going to Be Friends" is a song by American alternative rock band the White Stripes from their album White Blood Cells. It was released as a promotional single in 2002, and tells the story of meeting a new friend at the beginning of a school year.

== Background and music ==
"Suzy Lee", who is mentioned in the song in "We're Going to Be Friends", makes recurring appearances in White Stripes' discography, including in their eponymous album, which includes the song "Suzy Lee", as well as on Get Behind Me Satan, which is dedicated to Suzy Lee, "Wherever she may be..."

The song speaks of a girl and boy who become friends while engaging in activities in and out of school. AllMusic said the song "takes a nostalgic look back at the innocence of school days with a surprisingly sensitive vocal as [Jack] expertly paints impressions of days past with deft economy."

== Music video ==
The video features Jack and Meg White on a couch in front of their house at night time. The couch was on the curb as they planned to discard of it. Jack is playing a Framus 5/59 Sorella guitar, while Meg is sleeping alongside him (Meg was genuinely sleeping as it was approximately midnight by the time the video was filmed). Jack wakes Meg as the song ends. The cover of the single is a still from the video.

The video was shot in one take after the band had finished shooting for the video for the song "Hotel Yorba", which was director of photography Kevin Carrico's idea as he some extra film available after the shoot.

== Reception ==
Tom Maginnis with AllMusic called the song a "sweet acoustic ballad", and NME called it "fey childhood-sweetheart folk". The A.V. Club said it was "the album's most shocking track."

== In popular culture ==
Featured in the opening credits of the 2004 film Napoleon Dynamite, writer/director Jared Hess commented that, originally, they could not find the song they were looking for, but wanted to use "We're Going to Be Friends", so a copy of Napoleon Dynamite was sent to the White Stripes, who promptly approved the song's use in the film. It was the first film to feature a White Stripes song.

Singer-songwriter Jack Johnson recorded a cover of the song on his album Sing-A-Longs and Lullabies for the Film Curious George. From around 2006 or 2007 up until 2009, it was used in a promo for PBS Kids. Bright Eyes covered the song with guest First Aid Kit for the charity album Cool for School: For the Benefit of the Lunchbox Fund.

This song was also played at the end of the House episode entitled "Mirror Mirror", which aired October 30, 2007, although the song is not included in the show's soundtrack. The song is also featured in the Life in Pieces episode "Sexting Mall Lemonade Heartbreak". CBS included a song in commercials for its 2006 program The Class that resembled the tune of "We're Going to Be Friends". When magazine Broadcasting & Cable reached out to Monotone Management (the management company of the band at the time), the company declined to comment, but indicated that the band was aware of the song and were not pleased. In subsequent commercials, CBS used a different song.

This song was featured in the 2017 film Wonder. The film used two versions of the song, the original version performed by the White Stripes and a cover version performed by Caroline Pennell.

This is one of Conan O'Brien's favorite songs by the White Stripes and at his request, they performed it on the final episode of Late Night with Conan O'Brien on February 20, 2009. A portion of the song is also the opening theme to his podcast, Conan O'Brien Needs a Friend.

The song was featured on episode 5 ("The Jen Show") of the British show Extraordinary.

The song was also played during Season 7 Episode 2 of the Adult Swim animated series Rick and Morty titled "The Jerrick Trap", as well as being the end credits song of that episode.

== Children's book adaptation ==
We're Going to Be Friends
- Author: Jack White
- Illustrator: Elinor Blake
- Genre: Children's literature
- Publisher: Third Man Books
- Publication date: November 7, 2017
- Publication place: United States
- ISBN: 9780996401692
- Website: https://www.thirdmanbooks.com/catalog/were-going-to-be-friends

In May 2017, Third Man Records announced a children's book based on the single to be released on November 21, 2017, shortly after the White Stripes’ 20th anniversary. The book became available on November 7, 2017, for pre-release events and limited distribution. It was illustrated by Elinor Blake, an illustrator and animator for shows such as The Ren & Stimpy Show and Pee-wee's Playhouse. The book came with a digital copy of the original song and a cover version performed by The Woodstation Elementary School Singers, as well as a cover by April March.

== Certifications ==
Certifications for "We're Going to Be Friends"
Region	Certification	Certified units/sales
New Zealand (RMNZ)	Gold	15,000^{‡}
^{‡} Sales+streaming figures based on certification alone.
