= Soledad Brothers (band) =

American garage rock band

Background information
- Origin: Maumee, Ohio
- Genres: Garage rock, blues rock, rock and roll, punk blues
- Years active: 1998–2006
- Labels: Italy, Estrus, Loog, Alive, Cass
- Past members: Benjamin Swank; Johnny Walker; Henry Oliver

Soledad Brothers are an American garage rock trio from Maumee, Ohio. Taking strong influence from blues rock, the band consisted of Ben Swank on drums, Johnny Walker on guitar and vocals, and Oliver Henry (formerly of The Greenhornes and who was recruited just before the release of their second album) on sax and guitar. The band produced four albums: Soledad Brothers (2000), Steal Your Soul and Dare Your Spirit to Move (2002), Voice of Treason (2003), and The Hardest Walk (2006).

== History ==
Taking their name from a trio of convicted members of the Black Panther Party —George Jackson, Fleeta Drumgo, and John Clutchette, incarcerated at Soledad Prison, the Soledad Brothers formed in 1998 in their hometown of Maumee, Ohio (near Toledo).

The band's foundations began with Johnny Walker (Johnny Wirick) joining the punk blues band Henry And June, in which Benjamin "Swank" Smith was already performing as drummer. Henry and June existed from 1994 until 1996. Wirick continued playing with drummer Doug Walker in the two-piece blues outfit 'Johnny Walker'. The Soledad Brothers began in early 1998 after guitarist/vocalist Johnny Wirick (a.k.a. Johnny Walker) asked drummer Ben Smith (a.k.a. Ben Swank) if he wanted to play a show. When traveling north to Detroit for a few gigs, the duo was approached by Italy Records owner Dave Buick. The label recorded the band, releasing the single "Sugar and Spice", which attracted Estrus Records. This led to the release of "The Gospel According to John" single along with a number of others, the success of which prompted Estrus Records to put out the band's first full-length album.

The self-titled album was engineered by Jack White of The White Stripes, who also produced their second single. Meg White performs some percussion on this album. While both the Soledad Brothers and the White Stripes were Detroit bands heavily influenced by blues, the relationship between the two was also personal. Ben was Jack's roommate for some period of time, and Johnny played slide guitar on two songs from The White Stripes' debut album, as well as teaching Jack how to play slide. Oliver Henry and Meg White had a long-term relationship while the Soledad Brothers were still together.

The band followed up with the 2002 album, Steal Your Soul and Dare Your Spirit to Move. The blues influence is still very prevalent, but also saw the introduction of the heavier '60s and '70s Brit-rock influence.

The Soledads' third release came in 2003, Voice of Treason, on Loog Records in the UK. It saw the band expand their sound with some jazz influence, and some strange atmospheric sounds. The bulk of the album still retained their distinctive blues-rock style.

Their fourth album, The Hardest Walk, released in 2006 on Alive Records in the US and Loog in the UK, transcends the rampant garage blues that had so characterized the band's previous work by taking in a diverse range of influences, from Dr John and Albert Ayler to Syd Barrett and early Neil Young, with some Britpop melodies and soul grooves added.

It was announced within weeks of the album's release, however, that the band was breaking up. Upcoming shows were cancelled and the band's final gigs were at the Magic Stick in Detroit and the Southgate House (The birthplace of the Tommy Gun) in Newport, Kentucky.

Johnny Walker reconvened the Soledad Brothers in the summer of 2026 with a short tour of the United Kingdom.

== Post break-up: Cut in the Hill Gang ==
Walker is now playing in a band called Cut in the Hill Gang, based in Covington, Kentucky. The band released their debut, a vinyl single on Little Room Record Co. This marks the first release of Little Room Record Co. The tracks on the single are "Quixotic Dream" and a White Stripes cover, "Sugar Never Tasted So Good". The single became available February 12, 2008. There were 500 7-inch records pressed on black vinyl. A full-length LP was released by the Little Room Record Co. on May 19, 2009.

Henry Oliver reclaimed his real name Brian Olive and released a solo CD for Alive in 2009 self-titled as Brian Olive.

Johnny Walker founded the trio All-Seeing Eyes in 2013, who recorded a 45 rpm record that was released in 2016 by Cincinnati USA Music Heritage Foundation.

Ben Swank became one of the co-founders of Jack White's Third Man Records along with Dirtbombs drummer Ben Blackwell and White himself in 2009. Third Man is dedicated to "bring[ing] tangibility and spontaneity back into the record business and issue releases that leave no doubt in the minds of listeners that music is indeed sacred."

== Discography ==
=== Albums ===
- Master Supertone CD (self-released/no label, 1998), 20 copies
- Master Supertone LP (Cass, 2015)
- Soledad Brothers LP/CD (Estrus, 2000), 300 copies on red vinyl
- Steal Your Soul and Dare Your Spirit to Move LP/CD (Estrus, 2002), 400 copies on blue vinyl
- Live LP/CD (Sweet Nothing, 2003)
- Live LP/CD (Dim Mak, 2003)
- Live CD (Smash Music, 2004), recorded live at The Gold Dollar June 2000, Dim Mak version, 300 on white vinyl
- Voice of Treason LP/CD (Polydor, 2003)
- The Hardest Walk LP/CD (Alive Records, 2006), 1000 copies on purple vinyl

=== Singles ===
- "Sugar & Spice"/"Johnny's Death Letter" 7-inch (Italy Records, 1998) (Jack White appears on "Johnny's Death Letter")
- "The Gospel According to John"/"Mysterious Ways" 7-inch (Estrus, 1999) (first pressing: red vinyl, second pressing: black vinyl (limited pressing of 1000))
- "Good Feeling"/"Magazine" 7-inch (Polydor Limited, 2006) (CD-maxi includes video & tracks "Magazine" and "Circle Girl")
- "Human Race Blues"/"Soledarity" 7-inch (Cass, 2015)

=== Compilation appearances ===
- Purr Like a Kitten LP (Style Over Substance Records, 1997)
- Sympathetic Sounds of Detroit LP/CD (Sympathy for the Record Industry, 2001), produced and recorded by Jack White, mixed by White and Jim Diamond
- X-Mas Surprise Package Volume 4 7-inch (Flying Bomb Records, 2001), clear yellow or black vinyl
- The Estrus Double Dynamite Sampler Volume 3 CD (Estrus, 2002)
- X-Mas Surprise Package (The Collector's Edition) CD (Flying Bomb Records, 2002)
- FabricLive.07 mixed by John Peel (Fabric 2002)
- Dim Mak 2003 Sampler CD (Dim Mak, 2003)
- New Blood - The New Rock N Roll Vol. 3 CD (Artrocker, 2003)
- Root Damage 2xLP/2xCD (Sympathy for the Record Industry, 2003)
- Smash Music Sampler CD (Smash Music, 2004)
- Detroit Breakdown - The Rocked Out Motor City Music Sampler CD (PBS 106.7FM, 2004)
- Superfuzz CD (Lowfly Records, 2005), featuring Dooley Wilson
- This Is Punk Rock Blues - Vol No. 1 CD (Punk Rock Blues, 2005)
- He Put the Bomp in the Bomp (Bomp records, 2007)

=== Music videos ===
- "Handle Song", directed by James R. Petix (2004)
- "Good Feeling", directed by James R. Petix (2006)

=== Appearances ===
- They appear in Detroit Rock Movie.
- They appear in the documentary It Came From Detroit, directed by James R. Petix
- A cover of the song "Goin' Back to Memphis" can be found on the White Stripes 2004 released live DVD Under Blackpool Lights which was also covered by The White Stripes on The Conan O'Brien Show
