= Death Letter =

Traditional Delta blues song

- 1985 Edsel reissue

Song by Son House

from the album Father of Folk Blues
- Released: 1965
- Recorded: April 12–14, 1965
- Studio: Columbia, New York City
- Genre: Delta blues
- Length: 4:19
- Label: Columbia
- Songwriter: Son House
- Producers: John Hammond, Frank Driggs

"Death Letter", also known as "Death Letter Blues", is the signature song of the Delta blues musician Son House. It is structured upon House's earlier recording "My Black Mama, Part 2" from 1930. House's 1965 performance was on a metal-bodied National resonator guitar using a copper slide. Of House's several songs titled "Walking Blues", the 1942 recording is actually yet another version of "Death Letter".

One commentator noted that it is "one of the most anguished and emotionally stunning laments in the Delta blues œuvre." Several artists have covered the song, including the White Stripes.

== Lyrics ==
The song is about a man who learns of the death of the woman he loves through a letter delivered to him early in the morning. The narrator later views her body on the cooling board at the morgue, attends her funeral and returns to his home in a state of depression.

House's lyrics draw from traditional sources. Other blues musicians recorded related songs, including Lead Belly ("Death Letter Blues"), Ishman Bracey ("Trouble Hearted Blues"), Ida Cox ("Death Letter Blues"), Robert Wilkins ("Nashville Stonewall") and Blind Willie McTell ("On the Cooling Board").

== Folk revival performances ==
"Death Letter" was the centerpiece of Son House's live performances during the blues revival of the 1960s. House often altered the tempo and lyrics for different performances of "Death Letter", occasionally playing the song more than once during the same concert.

== The White Stripes version ==
"Death Letter"

Song by the White Stripes

from the album De Stijl
- Released: June 20, 2000
- Genre: Blues rock
- Length: 4:29
- Label: Sympathy for the Record Industry
- Songwriter: Eddie James "Son" House
- Producer: Jack White

The White Stripes covered "Death Letter" for their second studio album, De Stijl (2000). It is a blues rock rendition of the song, and Lizzy Goodman at NPR noted its camp sound. The White Stripes performed the song live at the 2004 Grammy Awards and Glastonbury Festival 2005.

== Other versions ==
Skip James reworked the music and lyrics for his song "Special Rider Blues". Avant-garde blues artist Jandek added a verse from "Death Letter" to his song "I Went Outside". "Burying Ground" by Muddy Waters deals with the same subject. Captain Beefheart used an extensive reference in "Ah Feel Like Ahcid" on the album Strictly Personal.

"Death Letter" has been recorded by several popular musicians, including the Grateful Dead, John Mellencamp, Chris Thomas King, David Johansen, Tony McPhee, Johnny Winter, Blues Band, the Derek Trucks Band, the Tallest Man on Earth and the Growl. Canadian punk rock band Eamon McGrath & the Wild Dogs recorded the song in a hardcore punk style. Diamanda Galás, Cassandra Wilson, James Blood Ulmer, Gov't Mule, Geoff Muldaur and Charlie Pickett have also recorded the piece. The Cassandra Wilson cover, first included on her 1995 album New Moon Daughter, was selected as the theme song for the third season of the HBO anthology series True Detective airing in early 2019.

A film titled Death Letter Blues was released in 2025.
