= Lafayette Blues =

Single by the White Stripes
- B-side: "Sugar Never Tasted So Good"
- Released: November 1998
- Genre: Garage rock
- Length: 2:10
- Label: Italy
- Composers: Jack White, Meg White
- Lyricist: Jack White
- Producer: Jack White

The White Stripes singles chronology
"Let's Shake Hands" (1998)	"Lafayette Blues" (1998)	"The Big Three Killed My Baby" (1999)

Professional ratings
Review scores
Source	Rating
AllMusic	3/5 stars

"Lafayette Blues" is the second 7" single of the Detroit-based American garage rock band the White Stripes. It is backed with "Sugar Never Tasted So Good".

In October 1998, 1,000 copies of the single were released on white vinyl. In 2001, a second edition of 1,000 black vinyl were released. Today, it is scarce and obtains high prices on auction websites like eBay. Many copies of White Blood Cells, The White Stripes' third album, were packaged with a bonus DVD which featured an audio track of "Lafayette Blues" (as well as "Hand Springs").

The lyrics of "Lafayette Blues" are a list of French names of streets in the band's hometown, Detroit, Michigan. Live performances of "Lafayette Blues" contain various arrangements of the names.

== Track listing ==
All lyrics are written by Jack White; all music is composed by Jack and Meg White.

No.	Title	Length
1.	"Lafayette Blues"	2:15
2.	"Sugar Never Tasted So Good"	2:56
