= Hello Operator (song) =

2000 single by The White Stripes

Single by the White Stripes

from the album De Stijl
- B-side: "Jolene"
- Released: May 2000
- Studio: Third Man Studio
- Genre: Garage rock
- Length: 2:37
- Label: Sympathy for the Record Industry
- Composers: Jack White, Meg White
- Lyricist: Jack White
- Producer: Jack White

The White Stripes singles chronology
"Hand Springs" (1999)	"Hello Operator" (2000)	"Lord, Send Me an Angel" (2000)

"Hello Operator" is the only single released from De Stijl, the second album by the Detroit, Michigan, garage rock band the White Stripes. It was released in May 2000, backed by a cover of Dolly Parton's "Jolene". Live recordings of both songs are available on Under Blackpool Lights.

John Peel listed it as his single of the week on his radio show, despite it not being released in the UK.

== Critical reception ==
Paste and Stereogum ranked the song number ten and number seven, respectively, on their lists of the 10 greatest White Stripes songs. Rolling Stone praised Jack White's "knack for phrasing—both his vocals and guitar lines", and Meg White's "minimal" drumming style.

== Track listing ==
No.	Title	Length
1.	"Hello Operator"	2:37
2.	"Jolene" (Dolly Parton cover)	3:13

== Personnel ==
- Jack White – vocals, guitars
- Meg White – drums
- John Szymanski – harmonica
