= The Big Three Killed My Baby =

1999 single by The White Stripes

Single by the White Stripes

from the album The White Stripes
- Released: March 1999
- Recorded: January 1999
- Studio: Ghetto Recorders (Detroit)
- Genre: Garage rock, punk blues
- Length: 2:29
- Label: Sympathy for the Record Industry
- Composers: Jack White, Meg White
- Lyricist: Jack White
- Producer: Jack White

The White Stripes singles chronology
"Lafayette Blues" (1998)	"The Big Three Killed My Baby" (1999)	"Hand Springs" (1999)

"The Big Three Killed My Baby" was released in March 1999 as a 7" single and is the third track on re-releases of The White Stripes, the eponymous debut of the Detroit-based American garage rock band the White Stripes. A live recording of the song is featured on Under Blackpool Lights; the band's first official DVD release. The single is backed with "Red Bowling Ball Ruth".

"The Big Three" refers to the three major automakers in the 1950s and 1960s: Ford, Chrysler and General Motors, all of which have their headquarters in Detroit. The song is an attack on these companies, relating to the engineering strategy of planned obsolescence, and supression of innovation.

The song mentions "Tucker's blood", a reference to Preston Tucker's ill-fated Tucker 48, which the Big Three likely had a hand in sabotaging. Writing for Ultimate Guitar, Justin Beckner speculated that this could also be a metaphorical reference to the band's struggle against the music industry and the "Big Three" record labels as independent musicians: "It's easy to see how and why Jack White would identify with someone like Preston Tucker – a small independent creator with great ideas, feeling the oppressive crush of "The Big Three"."

Jack White has stated in interviews that he does not believe music to be a viable medium for political messages and did not write another political song until the 2007 release of "Icky Thump" (which criticizes American immigration policy). Throughout the White Stripes later years, they performed the song live with alternate lyrics referring to the Iraq War: "Bush's hands are turning red... and I found out your baby is dead."

The photo that the band is standing in front of on the single's cover has a note on it, which reads "Insert your money here", a reference to the costs of maintaining automobiles which are intentionally engineered to become prematurely obsolete.

== Track listing ==
No.	Title	Length
1.	"The Big Three Killed My Baby"	2:29
2.	"Red Bowling Ball Ruth"	2:05

== Personnel ==
Personnel taken from The Big Three Killed My Baby liner notes.

- Jack White – guitar, vocals
- Meg White – drums
