= The Hardest Button to Button =

2003 single by the White Stripes

Single by the White Stripes

from the album Elephant
- B-side: "St. Ides of March"
- Released: August 11, 2003
- Recorded: April–May 2002
- Studio: Toe Rag (London, England)
- Genre: Alternative rock; garage rock
- Length: 3:32
- Label: V2; Third Man
- Composers: Jack White; Meg White
- Lyricist: Jack White
- Producer: Jack White

The White Stripes singles chronology
"Seven Nation Army" (2003)	"The Hardest Button to Button" (2003)	"I Just Don't Know What to Do with Myself" (2003)

Music video
- "The Hardest Button To Button" on YouTube

"The Hardest Button to Button" is a song by American garage rock band the White Stripes from their fourth album, Elephant. According to Jack, the song is about a child trying to find his place in a dysfunctional family when a new baby comes. The cover of the single is an allusion to the graphics of Saul Bass, seen in the movie posters and title sequences of films such as Anatomy of a Murder and The Man with the Golden Arm. The cover also alludes to White's then-broken index finger and his obsession with the number three.

"The Hardest Button to Button" was serviced to US alternative radio on August 11, 2003, through V2 and Third Man Records, while in the United Kingdom, the song was issued commercially on November 17 through XL Recordings and Third Man. Upon its release, the song reached number 23 on the UK Singles Chart and number eight on the US Billboard Modern Rock Tracks chart. Music critics praised "The Hardest Button to Button" and it has been considered one of the band's signature songs.

The song's music video, directed by Michel Gondry, shows Jack and Meg White performing the song while pixilation animation is used to create the effect that numerous duplicates of their instruments appear with every beat. It similarly earned acclaim and four nominations at the 2004 MTV Video Music Awards.

== Composition ==
"The Hardest Button to Button" is an alternative and garage rock song that runs for a duration of three minutes and thirty-two seconds. According to the sheet music published at Musicnotes.com by Universal Music Publishing Group, it is written in the time signature of common time, with a moderate rock tempo of 128 beats per minute. "The Hardest Button to Button" is composed in the key of A minor, while Jack's vocal range spans one octave and one note, from a low of G_{3} to a high of A_{4}. The song has a basic sequence of A_{5}–C_{5}–A_{5}–C_{5}–A_{5}–C_{5}–B_{5}–D_{5} during the introduction, changes to A_{5}–C_{5}–A_{5}–C_{5}–A_{5}–C_{5}–B_{5}–B♭_{5} in the verses and follows A_{sus4}–C–A_{sus4}–C–A_{sus4}–C–B–B♭ at the instrumental break as well as the refrain as its chord progression.

== Reception ==
"The Hardest Button to Button" earned praise from publications such as Rough Trade, and spawned an acclaimed music video directed by Michel Gondry.

== Music video ==
A screenshot of the music video for "The Hardest Button to Button". Meg White enters and exits a PATH train at 33rd Street station, travelling by a seemingly endless supply of bass drums.

The music video for "The Hardest Button to Button" is the third White Stripes video directed by Michel Gondry, after "Fell in Love with a Girl" and "Dead Leaves and the Dirty Ground" (two years later, he would direct the music video for "The Denial Twist").

The video utilizes pixilation animation to create the effect of dozens of drum kits and guitar amplifiers multiplying to the rhythm of the song as Jack and Meg perform. For example, in one sequence, Meg is seen playing the bass drum at a PATH train station. On every beat, a new drum materializes just ahead of her and she instantly appears behind it to play that beat, leaving all the previous drums vacant. This effect was achieved by first setting up a trail of bass drums. Meg was filmed performing a single beat on the last drum in the line, which was then removed; she would move back one drum, play another beat, and so on. The sequence was edited and run in reverse for the video, making the drums seemingly materialize out of thin air. Gondry used 32 identical Ludwig drum kits, 32 identical amplifiers, and 16 identical microphone stands during the shoot. The drum kits were donated to a music school after the shoot. The video also features a short cameo by Beck, who plays a man in a white suit presenting Jack with a "box with something in it".

Much of the video was filmed around Riverside Drive and the Columbia University area near Grant's Tomb and around the 125th Street exit and surrounding neighborhood, all part of the Upper West Side in Manhattan, New York City. Parts of the video were filmed at the 33rd Street PATH station. According to Gondry, filming locations had to be next to each other in order to set up the shoot in sequential order. Jack appears with a cast on his hand, after he had broken his index finger in a car accident while on tour.

== Track listings ==
UK and Australasian CD single

1. "The Hardest Button to Button"
2. "St. Ides of March"
3. "The Hardest Button to Button" (video)

UK 7-inch single

A. "The Hardest Button to Button" (Jack White)
B. "St. Ides of March"

== Personnel ==
Personnel are taken from the UK CD single liner notes.

- Jack White – vocals, guitar
- Meg White – drums

== Charts ==
Chart (2003–2004)	Peak position
Australia (ARIA)	54
Ireland (IRMA)	42
Netherlands (Dutch Top 40 Tipparade)	13
Netherlands (Single Top 100)	90
Scotland Singles (OCC)	31
UK Singles (OCC)	23
UK Indie (OCC)	1
US Alternative Airplay (Billboard)	8

== Certifications ==
Region	Certification	Certified units/sales
Canada (Music Canada)	Gold	40,000^{‡}
New Zealand (RMNZ)	Gold	15,000^{‡}
^{‡} Sales+streaming figures based on certification alone.

== Release history ==
Region	Date	Format(s)	Label(s)	Ref.
United States	August 11, 2003	Alternative radio	V2; Third Man	
United Kingdom	November 17, 2003	7-inch vinyl; CD	XL; Third Man	
Australia	November 24, 2003	CD	XL; Third Man; Remote Control	

== In popular culture ==
The song and video concept is used/spoofed in The Simpsons episode "Jazzy and the Pussycats" (series 18, ep 2), with The White Stripes guest starring as themselves. Bart Simpson starts playing to the song, imitating the video routine, until eventually crashing into Meg's drumkit. She and Jack chase Bart until he leaves them suspended in midair over an open drawbridge at the end of a riff, and they fall onto a garbage barge.

The song is a playable track in Rock Band 3.

The song was used on a trailer for the Justice League movie. Previously another White Stripes song, "Icky Thump", was used for a trailer of the same movie.
