= Sympathetic Sounds of Detroit =

Compilation album by Various artists
- Released: April 17, 2001
- Genre: Garage rock, punk rock
- Length: 41:47
- Label: SFTRI
- Producer: Jack White

Professional ratings
Review scores
Source	Rating
AllMusic	4/5 stars

Sympathetic Sounds of Detroit is a compilation album of American garage rock and punk bands from Detroit, released in 2001. Put together by Jack White of the White Stripes, it featured bands such as the Von Bondies, the Dirtbombs, and the Detroit Cobras. It was recorded in the home of Jack White, and he, along with nephew and the Dirtbombs drummer Ben Blackwell can be heard singing backup on "Shaky Puddin'," a Soledad Brothers track.

Jack White produced the album to preserve the work of a few bands who were a significant part of Detroit's music scene in the 1990s, but were unlikely to achieve the same level of mainstream success as the White Stripes. The album cover features an image of Cadillac Place.

== Track listing ==
1. "Black Girl" – The Paybacks
2. "Payback Blues" – The Paybacks
3. "Dirtbomb Blues" – The Dirtbombs
4. "I'm Through with White Girls" – The Dirtbombs
5. "Accusatory" – The Hentchmen
6. "Black and Blue" – Ko & the Knockouts
7. "Come on Blues" – Come Ons
8. "Sunday Drive" – Come Ons
9. "Soledad Blues" – Soledad Brothers
10. "Shaky Puddin'" – Soledad Brothers
11. "Sound of Terror" – The Von Bondies
12. "High Class" – The Buzzards
13. "Shout Bama Lama" – The Detroit Cobras
14. "Banty Rooster Blues" – Bantam Rooster
15. "Run Rabbit Run" – Bantam Rooster
16. "Whiskey 'n Women" – The Clone Defects
17. "Decal on My Sticker" – Whirlwind Heat
18. "Red Death at 6:14" – The White Stripes
19. "Buzzard Blues" – The Buzzards
