= Let's Shake Hands =

1998 single by The White Stripes

Single by the White Stripes
- Released: April 1998
- Recorded: 1997
- Genre: Garage punk
- Length: 2:01
- Label: Italy
- Composers: Jack White, Meg White
- Lyricist: Jack White
- Producer: Jack White

The White Stripes singles chronology
"Let's Shake Hands" (1998)	"Lafayette Blues" (1998)

Music video
- "Let's Shake Hands" on YouTube

Professional ratings
Review scores
Source	Rating
AllMusic	3/5 stars

"Let's Shake Hands" is the debut single of American garage rock band the White Stripes. It was released in April 1998, and marks their first recording. A live recording of the song is featured on Under Blackpool Lights as well as Under Great White Northern Lights.

"Let's Shake Hands" was the first song the band recorded in their living room for Dave Buick, who offered to finance the release of their first single. The style surprised Buick based on the band's live performances, but—according to an interview with The New Yorker, Jack said it was "a declaration that the White Stripes weren’t going to observe punk proprieties."

== Track listing ==
No.	Title	Length
1.	"Let's Shake Hands"	2:01
2.	"Look Me Over Closely" (Marlene Dietrich cover)	2:09
