= Dead Leaves and the Dirty Ground =

2002 single by the White Stripes

Single by the White Stripes

from the album White Blood Cells
- Released: July 1, 2002
- Studio: Easley-McCain Recording (Memphis, Tennessee)
- Genre: Alternative rock; blues rock; indie rock; garage rock
- Length: 3:04
- Label: V2; XL
- Composers: Jack White, Meg White
- Lyricist: Jack White
- Producer: Jack White

The White Stripes singles chronology
"Fell in Love with a Girl" (2002)	"Dead Leaves and the Dirty Ground" (2002)	"We're Going to Be Friends" (2002)

Music video
- "Dead Leaves and the Dirty Ground" on YouTube

"Dead Leaves and the Dirty Ground" is a song by the American rock band the White Stripes and the opening track of their third album, White Blood Cells (2001). It was released in the United States in July 2002 by V2 Records, with XL Recordings handling the United Kingdom and Australia releases in September 2002. The song was written by Jack White and composed by him and Meg White. Musically, "Dead Leaves and the Dirty Ground" is an alternative and garage rock song with lyrics about a man coping with his lover's abandonment.

"Dead Leaves and the Dirty Ground" was well-received by music critics, who praised its composition and display of Jack and Meg's chemistry. Commercially, it reached the top thirteen of the US Alternative Airplay, Scottish Singles and UK Singles charts, and ended 2002 at number 63 on Billboard's Modern Rock Tracks chart and number 25 on the UK Singles Chart. The song is one of the White Stripes's enduring works, covered by artists including Jimmy Page and "Weird Al" Yankovic, and featured as a playable track in the video game Rock Band 3.

== Composition ==
"Dead Leaves and the Dirty Ground" is an alternative rock and garage rock song that runs for a duration of 3 minutes and 4 seconds. It is written in the time signature of common time, with a mid tempo of 80 beats per minute. The key of the two guitars range from A to D major. Jack White's vocal range spans from G_{4} to A♯_{5}. Meg White makes extensive use of the crash cymbal, hi-hat, kick drum, and snare drum in the choruses, and introduces the floor tom, tom drum and ride cymbal in the pre-choruses and verses.

Lyrically, "Dead Leaves and the Dirty Ground" is about a man who is abandoned by his lover, and struggles to deal with the aftermath and the wreckage of their home.

== Reception ==
In a review of the song for AllMusic, Tom Maginnis describes "Dead Leaves and the Dirty Ground" as a "grimy rocker", noting it as a display of the duo's "keen understanding of musical dynamics". Alexis Petridis of The Guardian ranked it as the greatest White Stripes song, calling it "incredibly exciting" and "the sound of a band who are abundantly aware how special they are [...] It couldn’t be the work of anyone else." Paste and Stereogum ranked the song number three and number five, respectively, on their lists of the 10 greatest White Stripes songs.

== Music video ==
The music video for this song, directed by Michel Gondry, depicts Jack coming back to his trashed London house and surveying reckless destruction. While he goes from room to room, video of the party events that led to the decimation (and of his and Meg's relationship before he left) is projected over the scenery, until in the final scene she leaves him.

== Track listings ==
All lyrics written by Jack White, except where noted; all music is composed by Jack and Meg White, except where noted. The live singles were recorded in 2002 at Maida Vale Studios in England, and the DVD release features an interview with Arthur P. Dottweiler.

7"
No.	Title	Writer(s)	Length
1.	"Dead Leaves and the Dirty Ground"		3:04
2.	"Stop Breaking Down – Live At The BBC Studios Maida Vale"	Robert Johnson	5:38

CD
No.	Title	Writer(s)	Length
1.	"Dead Leaves and the Dirty Ground"		3:04
2.	"Suzy Lee – Live At The BBC Studios Maida Vale"		4:13
3.	"Stop Breaking Down – Live At The BBC Studios Maida Vale"	Robert Johnson	5:38

DVD
No.	Title	Length
1.	"Dead Leaves and the Dirty Ground"	3:04
2.	"Arthur P. Dottweiler"

== Personnel ==
Credits are adapted from the liner notes of "Dead Leaves and the Dirty Ground".

- Jack White – guitar, vocal
- Meg White – drums

== Charts ==
=== Weekly charts ===
Chart (2002)	Peak position
Scottish Singles Sales (Official Charts)	26
UK Singles (Official Charts)	25
UK Indie (Official Charts)	3
US Alternative Airplay (Billboard)	19

=== Year-end charts ===
Chart (2002)	Position
US Modern Rock Tracks (Billboard)	63

== Release history ==
Region	Date	Format(s)	Label(s)	Ref.
United States	July 1, 2002	Active rock; alternative radio	V2	
United Kingdom	September 2, 2002	7-inch vinyl; CD	XL	
Australia	September 23, 2002	CD	XL	

== Covers and samples ==
- Mandolinist Chris Thile covered "Dead Leaves and the Dirty Ground" on his 2006 album How to Grow a Woman from the Ground in a bluegrass style.
- Nina Persson covered this song in the 2006 film Om Gud Vill (God Willing).
- Jack White performed this song with Jimmy Page and the Edge in the 2009 documentary It Might Get Loud.
- The main riffs and vocal patterns were borrowed in "Weird Al" Yankovic's 2009 White Stripes style parody "CNR".
- The song was made available to download on May 23, 2011, for play in the Rock Band 3 music gaming platform in both Basic rhythm, and PRO mode which takes advantage of the use of a real guitar / bass guitar, along with standard MIDI-compatible electronic drum kits / keyboards in addition to vocals.
