= Walking with a Ghost (EP) =

2005 EP by the White Stripes

EP by the White Stripes
- Released: December 6, 2005
- Recorded: 2005
- Studios: Teatro Amazones (Manaus); Ultresuede (Cincinnati); Village Recorder (Los Angeles)
- Genres: Alternative rock; indie rock
- Length: 19:02
- Labels: V2; Third Man
- Producer: Jack White

Walking with a Ghost is the only extended play (EP) by American rock duo the White Stripes. It was released worldwide by V2 and Third Man on December 6, 2005. Titled after their cover of the Tegan and Sara song of the same name, the EP reached number 138 on the UK singles chart and number 67 on the UK physical singles chart.

== Recording and composition ==
The White Stripes, composed of guitarist and lead vocalist Jack White and drummer Meg White, released their fifth studio album, Get Behind Me Satan, in June 2005 to critical and commercial success. Jack married model Karen Elson that same month.

The title track of Walking with a Ghost, a cover of the Tegan and Sara song of the same name, was recorded sometime after the production of Get Behind Me Satan. According to Tegan Quin, "It was while being interviewed at one of those radio stations that someone read a quote from Jack White... he said he liked the song because it felt like something he could have written for the White Stripes." While Tegan and Sara were touring in Detroit, Meg attended one of their shows and brought a CD player backstage to show the duo their cover. The end of the song features a distorted voice which, when played backwards, says "Get out of my head" repeatedly.

The remaining four live tracks were recorded at different points. "Same Boy You've Always Known" and "Screwdriver" were recorded at the Amazon Theatre, just hours after Jack and Elson's June wedding ceremony, while "As Ugly As I Seem" and "The Denial Twist" were recorded on August 15, 2005 for Morning Becomes Eclectic, a program hosted by NPR's KCRW.

== Release and reception ==
Professional ratings
Review scores
Source	Rating
AllMusic	3.5/5 stars
Pitchfork	6.1/10

The track "Walking with a Ghost" was released as an iTunes exclusive single on November 14, 2005, before the EP was distributed worldwide on December 6, 2005 through V2 Records and Jack's own Third Man Records. It was the first and only EP the White Stripes ever released. It achieved modest commercial success in the United Kingdom, reaching number 138 on the UK singles chart and number 67 on the UK physical singles chart. Tegan and Sara were happy with the band's cover.

A critic for AllMusic believed the reinvention of its title track as a "guitar-heavy rocker" made it seem like it was "always a White Stripes tune, with Jack White's unmistakable presence steering the song toward the territory of his own "Blue Orchid." They wrote that, with the four live tracks, Walking With a Ghost was a "brief yet solid disc." Conversely, Pitchfork's Matthew Murphy felt the cover was "genial", "singularly unpersuasive" and "unlikely to challenge anyone's previously held opinions about the Stripes, Tegan and Sara, walking, or ghosts."

== Track listing ==
All lyrics are written by Jack White, except where noted; all music is composed by Jack and Meg White, except where noted.

Walking with a Ghost track listing
No.	Title	Writer(s)	Length
1.	"Walking with a Ghost"	Tegan Quin, Sara Quin	2:49
2.	"Same Boy You've Always Known" (Live)		3:14
3.	"As Ugly As I Seem" (Live)		5:06
4.	"The Denial Twist" (Live)		2:37
5.	"Screwdriver" (Live)		5:15
Total length:			19:02

Japanese edition bonus track
No.	Title	Writer(s)	Length
6.	"Shelter of Your Arms"	Craig Fox	3:30
Total length:			22:32

== Personnel ==
Credits are adapted from the Japanese EP liner notes.

The White Stripes

- Jack White – vocals, guitar, piano, mixing; production (tracks 1–2, 5–6)
- Meg White – drums, bongos, percussion

Additional personnel

- John Curley – engineering (tracks 1, 6)
- Howie Weinberg – mastering (track 1)
- Greg Jackman – engineering (tracks 2, 5)
- Matthew Kettle – mixing (tracks 2, 5)
- Matt Lawrence – mixing (tracks 2, 5)
- Rohan Onraet – mixing assistance (tracks 2, 5)
- Mario Diaz – editing (tracks 3–4)
- Kevin Metcalfe – mastering (tracks 3–4, 6)
- Jared Nugent – mixing and engineering assistance (tracks 3–4)
- Jason Wormer – mastering (tracks 3–4)
- Ariana Morgenstern – production (tracks 3–4)

== Charts ==
Chart performance for Walking with a Ghost
Chart (2005)	Peak position
Scottish Singles	87
UK Physical Singles (OCC)	138
UK Singles (OCC)	67
