= My Doorbell =

2005 single by the White Stripes

Single by the White Stripes

from the album Get Behind Me Satan
- B-side: "Same Boy You've Always Known" (live); "Screwdriver" (live)
- Released: July 11, 2005
- Recorded: March 2005
- Studio: Third Man (Detroit, Michigan)
- Genre: Soul; pop
- Length: 4:01
- Label: V2; XL; Third Man
- Composers: Jack White III, Meg White
- Lyricist: Jack White III
- Producer: Jack White III

The White Stripes singles chronology
| "Blue Orchid" (2005) | "My Doorbell" (2005) | "The Denial Twist" (2005) |

Music video
- "My Doorbell" on YouTube

"My Doorbell" is a song by American alternative rock band the White Stripes, released as the second single from their album, Get Behind Me Satan, on July 11, 2005. The song was recorded at Third Man Studios in March 2005. The song garnered the White Stripes a 2006 Grammy nomination for Best Pop Performance by a Duo or Group with Vocals.

== Music video ==
The video for this single was directed by the Malloys, filmed in black-and-white, and features Jack and Meg performing in front of a crowd of children. It was filmed at The Magic Castle in Hollywood, California throughout two days in July 2005.

== Critical reception ==
Paste and Stereogum ranked the song number eight and number six, respectively, on their lists of the 10 greatest White Stripes songs.

== Track listings ==
Australian and New Zealand CD single

1. "My Doorbell"
2. "Same Boy You've Always Known" (live)
3. "Screwdriver" (live)

UK CD single

1. "My Doorbell"
2. "Screwdriver" (live)

UK 7-inch single

A. "My Doorbell"
B. "Same Boy You've Always Known" (live)

UK 12-inch single

A. "My Doorbell"
B. "Blue Orchid" (High Contrast remix)

== Charts ==
=== Weekly charts ===
Weekly chart performance for "My Doorbell"
| Chart (2005) | Peak position |
|---|---|
| Australia (ARIA) | 73 |
| Canada Rock Top 30 (Radio & Records) | 27 |
| Netherlands (Dutch Top 40) | 37 |
| Netherlands (Single Top 100) | 79 |
| New Zealand (Recorded Music NZ) | 8 |
| Scotland Singles (OCC) | 11 |
| UK Singles (OCC) | 10 |
| UK Indie (OCC) | 1 |
| US Alternative Airplay (Billboard) | 13 |

=== Year-end charts ===
Year-end chart performance for "My Doorbell"
| Chart (2005) | Position |
|---|---|
| UK Singles (OCC) | 140 |
| US Modern Rock Tracks (Billboard) | 52 |

== Certifications ==
Certifications for "My Doorbell"
| Region | Certification | Certified units/sales |
|---|---|---|
| New Zealand (RMNZ) | Gold | 15,000^{‡} |
| United Kingdom (BPI) | Silver | 200,000^{‡} |
^{‡} Sales+streaming figures based on certification alone.

== Release history ==
Release dates and formats for "My Doorbell"
| Region | Date | Format(s) | Label(s) | Ref. |
|---|---|---|---|---|
| United States | July 11, 2005 | Triple A; alternative radio | V2; Third Man | |
| United Kingdom | August 22, 2005 | 7-inch vinyl; 12-inch vinyl; CD | XL; Third Man | |
| Australia | September 5, 2005 | CD | XL; Third Man; Remote Control | |
