= Blue Orchid =

2005 single by the White Stripes

Single by the White Stripes

from the album Get Behind Me Satan
- B-side: "The Nurse"
- Released: April 18, 2005
- Recorded: March 2005
- Studio: Third Man (Detroit, Michigan)
- Genre: Alternative rock; blues rock
- Length: 2:37
- Label: V2; Third Man
- Composers: Jack White III, Meg White
- Lyricist: Jack White III
- Producer: Jack White III

The White Stripes singles chronology
| "Jolene (Live Under Blackpool Lights)" (2004) | "Blue Orchid" (2005) | "My Doorbell" (2005) |

Music video
- "Blue Orchid" on YouTube

"Blue Orchid" is the first track by the American alternative rock band the White Stripes from their album Get Behind Me Satan (2005), and the first single to be released from the album. The song was released six weeks after it was written. Although it was suspected that Jack White wrote the song about his breakup with Renée Zellweger, he has denied this claim. Lyrically, "Blue Orchid" is about White's longing for classical entertainment industries and the turmoil that the newer industries sent him through.

"Blue Orchid" was released to US rock radio on April 18, 2005. Commercially, the song topped the Canadian Singles Chart in June 2005 and reached the top 10 in the United Kingdom, peaking at number nine on the UK Singles Chart the same month. In the United States, the song reached number 43 on the Billboard Hot 100 and number seven on the Modern Rock Tracks chart. Elsewhere, the song was a top-twenty hit in Denmark and Norway. The music video, directed by Floria Sigismondi, was ranked number 21 on Yahoo!'s list of the "Top 25 Spookiest Videos" in 2005.

== Background ==
Basic tracking was done on March 10, 2005, with vocal overdubs completed on a later date. The song was mixed by John Hampton and Jack White at Ardent Studios in late-March and mastered on March 28 by Howie Weinberg at Masterdisk.

The single comes in three editions, each with different additional tracks. All three covers feature two people dressed up as the White Stripes, but are noticeably different people. The first CD and the 7-inch feature the couple in the same order as Get Behind Me Satan, with "Jack" on the right. The second CD version features "Jack" on the left.

In an NPR interview, Jack White referred to "Blue Orchid" as the song that saved the album. He has denied that the song relates to the ending of his relationship with Renée Zellweger.

== Music video ==
The video for "Blue Orchid" was ranked on Yahoo!'s "Top 25 Spookiest Videos" ranking in 2005, charting at number 21. It features Karen Elson, a model who would marry Jack White soon after the shoot. The video, which was directed by Floria Sigismondi, ends with a horse, its hooves raised in the air, about to stomp on Elson, but just before the hooves land on her, the video quickly goes black, ending.

== Track listings ==
US, UK, and Australian 7-inch single

A. "Blue Orchid"
B. "The Nurse"

US maxi-CD single

1. "Blue Orchid"
2. "Who's a Big Baby?"
3. "Though I Hear You Calling, I Will Not Answer"
4. "You've Got Her in Your Pocket" (live)
- Track 4 was recorded live in Belfast, Northern Ireland, on August 25, 2004

UK and Australian CD1

1. "Blue Orchid"
2. "Though I Hear You Calling, I Will Not Answer"

UK and Australian CD2

1. "Blue Orchid"
2. "Who's a Big Baby?"
3. "You've Got Her in Your Pocket" (live)
- Track 3 was recorded live in Belfast, Northern Ireland, on August 25, 2004

== Charts ==
=== Weekly charts ===
Weekly chart performance for "Blue Orchid"
| Chart (2005) | Peak position |
|---|---|
| Australia (ARIA) | 95 |
| Canada (Nielsen SoundScan) | 1 |
| Canada Rock Top 30 (Radio & Records) | 14 |
| Denmark (Tracklisten) | 20 |
| France (SNEP) | 67 |
| Netherlands (Single Top 100) | 81 |
| Norway (VG-lista) | 18 |
| Scotland Singles (OCC) | 5 |
| Sweden (Sverigetopplistan) | 55 |
| UK Singles (OCC) | 9 |
| UK Indie (OCC) | 2 |
| US Billboard Hot 100 | 43 |
| US Alternative Airplay (Billboard) | 7 |
| US Mainstream Rock (Billboard) | 32 |

=== Year-end charts ===
Year-end chart performance for "Blue Orchid"
| Chart (2005) | Position |
|---|---|
| UK Singles (OCC) | 133 |
| US Modern Rock Tracks (Billboard) | 37 |

== Certifications ==
Certifications for "Blue Orchid"
| Region | Certification | Certified units/sales |
|---|---|---|
| New Zealand (RMNZ) | Gold | 15,000^{‡} |
| United Kingdom (BPI) | Silver | 200,000^{‡} |
^{‡} Sales+streaming figures based on certification alone.

== Release history ==
Release dates and formats for "Blue Orchid"
| Region | Date | Format(s) | Label(s) | Ref. |
|---|---|---|---|---|
| United States | April 18, 2005 | Active rock; alternative radio; digital download | V2; Third Man | |
| Australia | May 30, 2005 | 7-inch vinyl; CD1 | XL; Third Man | |
| United Kingdom | May 30, 2005 | 7-inch vinyl; 2× CD | XL; Third Man | |
| Canada | May 31, 2005 | CD | V2; Third Man | |
| United States | May 31, 2005 | CD | V2; Third Man | |
| Australia | June 6, 2005 | CD2 | XL; Third Man | |

== Covers and remixes ==
"Blue Orchid" has been remixed by High Contrast on the album Fabric Live 25. It is the first track on the second disc of the album. It features the main guitar riff accompanied by a largely drum and bass inspired backing beat. The vocals from the song, "You took a white orchid, you took a white orchid and turned it blue" are repeated at various points throughout the track.

== In popular culture ==
"Blue Orchid" is used briefly in the trailer for the 2008 documentary It Might Get Loud, in which Jack White features with other musical artists The Edge and Jimmy Page. The song can also be heard in the movie The Green Hornet, which was directed by Michel Gondry, who also directed a number of music videos for the White Stripes.
