= The Denial Twist =

2005 single by the White Stripes

Single by the White Stripes

from the album Get Behind Me Satan
- B-side: "Shelter of Your Arms"; "As Ugly as I Seem"
- Released: October 31, 2005
- Recorded: March 2005
- Studio: Third Man (Detroit, Michigan)
- Length: 2:35
- Label: V2; XL; Third Man
- Composers: Jack White III, Meg White
- Lyricist: Jack White III
- Producer: Jack White III

The White Stripes singles chronology
"My Doorbell" (2005)	"The Denial Twist" (2005)	"Icky Thump" (2007)

Music video
- "The Denial Twist" on YouTube

"The Denial Twist" is the third single released from American alternative rock band the White Stripes' fifth studio album, Get Behind Me Satan (2005). The song took the most time to work on with three takes recorded during the album sessions.

== Music video ==
The music video for "The Denial Twist" was directed by Michel Gondry. Like some of his previous work (namely the Chemical Brothers' "Let Forever Be" and Kylie Minogue's "Come Into My World"), the video features a spectacular array of visual effects as it follows The White Stripes from a talk show performance to a late night drive back to an apartment. As the camera pans in a circle, Jack and Meg appear distorted. This refers to the lyric of the song; that what people think is true is often shaped by the context in which information is presented to them and their willingness to be deceived—even by themselves—as various aspects of the video radically shift in perspective, size, proportion and believability. The choice of Late Night with Conan O'Brien as a setting for the video, aside from the band's personal association, is due to the lesser known fact that, like many film and TV sets, the Late Night stage looks much larger on television than it actually is.

The optical illusion used in the video is the technique of forced perspective, through an Ames room and distortions derived from it.

Conan O'Brien in the music video for "The Denial Twist".

The creators of the distorted props, Jeff Everett and John Furgason, won a Music Video Production Association Award for Art Direction in 2006.

Conan O'Brien makes a cameo appearance in the video; The White Stripes had been a week-long musical guest on Late Night with Conan O'Brien when they were promoting Elephant. The square-headed O'Brien doll in the video was a reference to a similar one given to the comedian at the end of their week-long stay on the show. The plaster blow-up was actually created by Gondry. Music journalist Tom Breihan appears in the video as a taller double for O'Brien, having been cast by Gondry after interviewing him about the Directors Label DVD series.

This is Gondry's fourth video with The White Stripes, after "Fell in Love with a Girl", "Dead Leaves and the Dirty Ground" and "The Hardest Button to Button". The video can be found on the DVD compilation Michel Gondry 2: More Videos (Before and After DVD 1)

The song is also the final 3-inch record made for the triple inchophone. However, it was never commercially available, rather it was distrubuted by White himself in rare quantities. These 3-inch records are extremely rare and very few have ever come up for sale.

== Track listings ==
- UK CD single and 7-inch single 1
1. "The Denial Twist"
2. "Shelter of Your Arms" (the Greenhornes cover)
- UK 7-inch single 2
1. "The Denial Twist" (live on KCRW)
2. "As Ugly as I Seem" (live on KCRW)

== Personnel ==
Personnel adapted from UK CD single liner notes.

- Jack White – vocals, guitar, piano
- Meg White – drums, bongos, percussion
- Eddie Gillis – tambourine, shakers

== Charts ==
=== Weekly charts ===
Weekly chart performance for "The Denial Twist"
Chart (2005–2006)	Peak position
Denmark (Tracklisten)	14
Scottish Singles Sales (Official Charts)	16
UK Singles (Official Charts)	10
UK Indie (Official Charts)	1
US Alternative Airplay (Billboard)	5

=== Year-end charts ===
Year-end chart performance for "The Denial Twist"
Chart (2006)	Position
US Alternative Songs (Billboard)	38

== Release history ==
Release dates and formats for "The Denial Twist"
Region	Date	Format(s)	Label(s)	Ref.
Australia	October 31, 2005	CD	XL	
United States	November 7, 2005	Triple A radio	V2	
United Kingdom	November 14, 2005	CD	XL	
United States	November 21, 2005	Alternative radio	V2	
