= Get Behind Me Satan =

Studio album by the White Stripes
- Released: June 6, 2005
- Recorded: February–March 2005
- Studios: Third Man (Note: The album was recorded at Jack White's home on his staircase, in his living room, foyer, and dining room, as well as various other rooms in the house.) (Detroit, Michigan)
- Genres: Alternative rock; blues rock; blues; pop; country; experimental
- Length: 44:07
- Labels: V2; XL; Third Man
- Producer: Jack White

The White Stripes chronology
Elephant (2003)	Get Behind Me Satan (2005)	Icky Thump (2007)

Singles from Get Behind Me Satan
- 1. "Blue Orchid" Released: April 18, 2005; 2. "My Doorbell" Released: July 11, 2005; 3. "The Denial Twist" Released: October 31, 2005

Get Behind Me Satan is the fifth studio album by the American rock duo the White Stripes. It was released in June 2005, with V2 and Third Man handling distribution in the United States, and XL and Third Man handling international distribution. It was recorded in Jack White's home between February and March 2005, and Jack produced the whole album.

Described as the "most misunderstood entry in the White Stripes discography" by Jack White's own Third Man Records, Get Behind Me Satan musically diverts from the band's previous works with experimental production and lyrics that reference truth and actress Rita Hayworth. The album was promoted with early previews to journalists and releasing "Blue Orchid", "My Doorbell" and "The Denial Twist" as singles. It was not released in a vinyl format until 2015, as the band wanted to record a separate live version which never came to fruition. In the years following its release, Get Behind Me Satan has continued to be reissued.

Get Behind Me Satan charted within the top ten of nine countries, reaching number three on both the US Billboard 200 and the UK Albums Chart. The album received positive reviews from music critics, who praised its experimentation but some felt its production was too constricted. It received two nominations at the 2006 Grammy Awards, winning Best Alternative Album.

== Background and recording ==
"Satan is the end of any unhappiness I have. Get behind me–that's it. Any troubles I have are well-represented: betrayal, loss, pain, whatever's going on in my head and life. I got the last things out on that record."

— Jack on the themes of the album.

Get Behind Me Satan was conceived at a time when the White Stripes had felt "betrayed" and "burned" by close friends within the Detroit music scene such as Jason Stollsteimer, a member of the Von Bondies, which Jack White had got into a physical altercation with in December 2003, and Jim Diamond, who had filed a lawsuit against the band in October 2004, wanting royalties of their first two albums. As well as these confrontations, "friendships and relationships were breaking up," and Jack felt he "didn't want to get up and go to work." In the hindsight of 2006, Jack acknowledged that his own constitution had more to do with why he could no longer live in Detroit and that moving sooner likely would not have made a difference, as Get Behind Me Satan was "a farewell to a lot of the parts of my personality that I didn't want to see anymore," more so than it was a farewell to Detroit. For that reason, "the title gets better and better" but Jack would not elaborate further on it.

Jack described Get Behind Me Satan as "the absolute breaking point of the idea of home" which has been a recurring motif in his lyrics and his "[...] supposed, constructed new home was also shattering." With success and constant touring, Jack found it hard to stay connected to Detroit as his home and frequently performed "Boll Weevil" during concerts for this reason. He did not initially want to leave the city until he began to feel like a pariah. Yet he did regret doing so much to support other local artists and constantly being self-effacing to assuage them, feeling he "should have been more concerned with [himself]," as well as realizing that it was foolish to turn down millions of dollars worth of opportunities earlier in their career. They were previously adamantly against sync licensing in most cases, with Meg saying it was about self-respect, but Jack began to feel conflicted about turning down exorbitant amounts of money, even for things they legitimately did not want to be involved in. When they performed a free concert at New York City's Union Square in 2002, which was sponsored by Japanese car brand Nissan, Meg believed "the good outweighed the bad" and Jack insisted they stuck to their morals about working with the brand. The concept of "selling out" became increasingly irrelevant with fame, as their favorite artists such as the Rolling Stones had already done things that are conventional in the music industry, and they started to feel like they were only turning down things for the appeasement of others' opinions. Jack completely revised his opinion and embraced being a so-called "sellout," becoming unapologetic and even apathetic about the commercial aspects of the music industry. He remarked that fame reminded him of the playground bullying he endured as a child, and that the brunt of the backlash was directed at him as he is the extroverted one. The previous winter, in an interview reminiscing on the successful year of Elephant and Under Blackpool Lights, Jack said fame didn't necessarily bother him but that his working-class upbringing and the dynamic of his older brothers made it difficult for him to accept praise or indulge in his accrued wealth. Meg, on the other hand, felt that fame is a mixed blessing.

Meg also left Detroit at the same time and moved to Los Angeles, leaving behind "so much baggage," though clarified that the duo are "not anti-Detroit" as an entire city and their issues were with their rock scene. Their former friends in the Detroit rock scene made feel that they had to atone for and feel guilty about their success, of which no one could relate to, until they felt exiled–with Jack saying he sensed the voice of God telling him to leave the city. Get Behind Me Satan as well as its tour was their way of "coping" with the alienation. In 2004, when asked how his fight would become a chapter of the White Stripes' saga, Jack invoked Johnny Cash's colorful past as an outlaw and said, "if Jimmy Page had robbed a bank, I'm not gonna throw my Led Zeppelin record away," in that people were just looking for reasons to "tear [others] down." In a 2018 Rolling Stone interview that began with a retrospective on what occurred with Stollsteimer, Jack expressed a similar sentiment and no remorse for the physical altercation, saying the likes of Cash, Sid Vicious, and Jerry Lee Lewis (or even comedian Jerry Lewis) have had similar transgressions and that his anger was a justified, human reaction in that moment.

Jack had begun writing and recording demos for Get Behind Me Satan on a microcassette recorder throughout 2004 and early 2005, and had quit smoking due to its effect on his singing voice. He had written around 35 songs during this period, with many of the songs that would be recorded for the album either having been completely written or partially written during the sessions, as Jack had not actively been songwriting after Elephant. By September 2004, Jack had written "a quarter to half" of the songs. Elephant's engineer Liam Watson considered recording their subsequent album in Africa, or they considered a studio other than Toe Rag, though the plans never materialized. Although reports as early as October 2003 stated the White Stripes planned to record their fifth album by the end of that year, they did not know they would be making this album until less than a month before its February 2005 production, as Jack felt motivation to record these songs "immediately; as soon as possible," but had no idea what the album was going to sound like or where it would be recorded. They had no desire of making it "Elephant II". The reported cost of recording the album was under $10,000. (Note: It was ostensibly under $5,000 as Jack described 2001's White Blood Cells, whose budget was that amount, as their most expensive production until that of 2007's Icky Thump.) He described the songwriting of the album as cathartic and a "purging" of intense emotions, ultimately leaving him happy and rejuvenated after the mixing.

"I had been thinking about [leaving Detroit] for a long time, but the final decision to do it was kind of sudden. It's a bit like when you grow up in a family, where you always have to be that character, that kid, the same person you were before. You're not allowed to be a new person."

— Meg on leaving Detroit for Los Angeles

Get Behind Me Satan was recorded in around two weeks throughout late February and mid-March 2005 at Jack's home in Indian Village, which was referred to as Third Man Studios in the press release and liner notes for the album. (Note: When Jack White records at home, the liner notes refer to it as Third Man Studios.) The band considered the sessions to be "cursed" as the tape machine and microphones would malfunction and water would drip from the ceiling, however things improved by the recording of "Blue Orchid" toward the end. The inspiration of Rita Hayworth did not appear until the writing of "Take, Take, Take" as, "The album wasn't coming together. The songs were there but technically it wasn't happening. [...] I just needed one thing to focus on, because all the ideas were going in all different directions on the record and the idea of Rita Hayworth was that." If things had been copasetic, "[They] could have made two albums," in the two-week duration.

When asked why they recorded this album at home rather than a studio, Jack explained that by that time they'd become stagnant in that environment and he was tired of debating with engineers over production and the use of computers. At the time, Jack felt editing with razor blades was "the way it's supposed to be done," though he no longer practices this. The decision to record at home was not predetermined, but the house had a large staircase that Jack believed was suitable for recording and The White Stripes had experience with recording at home with their second album, De Stijl (2000).

Matthew Kettle, who had been mixing the band's live shows, recorded Get Behind Me Satan on a Studer 8 track tape machine. Six Coles 4038 microphones were exclusively used for the recording of the album. Jack was introduced to the Coles 4038 at the BBC's studios and it became his favorite microphone to use, despite the reluctance of engineers. A Steinway grand piano was rented in order to achieve a fuller sound. The foyer served as the main recording space, with the piano in the foyer and the drums situated on the second floor stair landing. Some songs were recorded in a back room. Jack had purchased a marimba (Note: Jack learned to play the marimba in high school as part of a music class.) not long before the recording and had it in the dining room, although he had no particular intention of using it on the album. "If there had been a sitar in the room and a zither," Jack said those instruments hypothetically would have been on the album too.

The album cover and photos featured in the album liner notes were taken by Ewen Spencer during a five-day shoot at Jack's home. The album's cover art likely draws on Mexican Catholic iconography, reflecting Jack's upbringing in a Mexican-American neighborhood and his enduring fascination with its imagery, however it was widely interpreted as a Zorro reference. Meg is not religious, and after this time period had been reading the novel Niels Lyhne (1880), by Danish author Jens Peter Jacobsen, about a fictional atheist's struggle with his chosen belief system. Although Meg did not specifically say that she herself is an atheist, Jack had strong opinions about it. (Note: The context of that conversation was initiated by the Icky Thump song "St. Andrew (This Battle Is in the Air)" on which Meg performed the vocals. The song has a religious theme and Meg was asked if she was "a believer." Meg said she didn't attend church, not whether she believes in God. Jack also said in that interview, and others, that he isn't religious. His response to Meg on her interpretation of Niels Lyhne was more about what a person's belief in God (or lack thereof) represents, in his opinion. The White Stripes collectively thanked God first in the credits of all six of their studio albums.) In an interview with NPR's Terry Gross, Meg said they generally respect each other's opinions on the subject. On the twentieth anniversary of the album's release, Jack revealed that the object he held on the cover is a drugstore glass container that contains an unknown white powder and is meant to represent temptation. The cover was notably used in the 2006 Gilmore Girls episode "I Get a Sidekick Out of You", with Lane and Zach in Meg and Jack's positions, respectively. Mixing was completed at Ardent Studios by John Hampton and Jack in late-March, with mastering completed by Howie Weinberg at Masterdisk, two weeks prior to the release of the first single.

In a statement on their website while on tour in Santiago, Chile, shortly before the album's release, Jack compared the process of releasing the album to having a baby, saying, "Meg and I have climbed pyramids, played in front of people who had absolutely no idea who we were, and been thrown around by guards, dogs, and machine guns. Dogs with machine guns. But our baby is on the way [...] going to come out head first."

== Music and lyrics ==
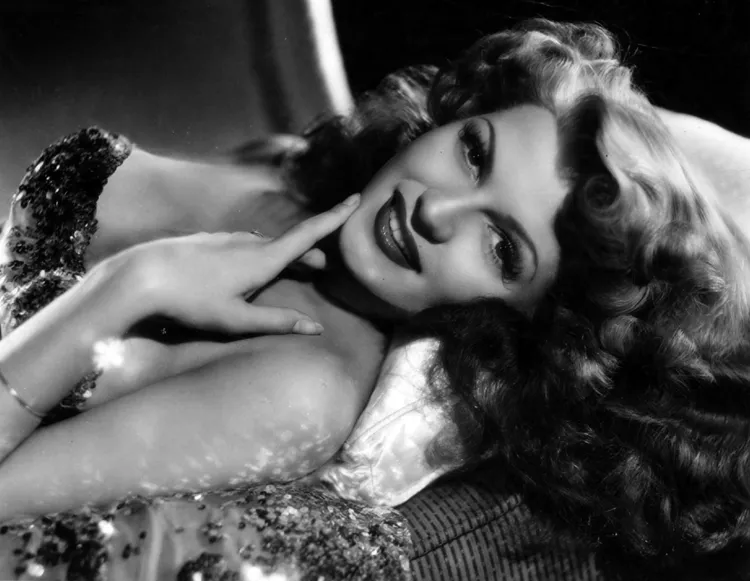
The lyrics of Get Behind Me Satan include multiple references to truth and actress Rita Hayworth (pictured in 1942).

Deemed the "most misunderstood entry in the White Stripes discography" by Jack White's own Third Man Records, Get Behind Me Satan is basic in production but marks a distinct change from its 2003 guitar-heavy predecessor, Elephant. With its reliance on piano-driven melodies and experimentation with marimba, the album plays down the punk and garage rock influences that dominated earlier White Stripes albums and has been described as an alternative rock, blues rock, blues, pop, and country album. Jack plays with different technique than in the past, replacing electric guitar with piano, mandolin, and acoustic guitar on all but three tracks, as his usual riff-conscious lead guitar style is overtaken by a predominantly rhythmic approach. Meg White expands her instrumentation with percussion bells, maracas and tambourines alongside her drumming.

Jack stated in an interview on the NPR radio show Fresh Air that "truth is the number one theme throughout the album Get Behind Me Satan."

The album's title refers to a well-known line from the story of the Temptation of Jesus which is later repeated against the disciple Simon Peter, in Matthew 16:23 of the New Testament. In the King James Version, the quotation is slightly different: "Get thee behind me, Satan". Jack stated in an interview with Mojo the possible interpretations of the album title, "It can mean, you're either for me or against me. And if you're not going to help me, get out of my way. Or maybe it relates to the Devil's music, and having the Devil back you up while you're playing it. Or, perhaps it relates to aiming for the truth, for doing the right thing, and telling the Devil to take his temptations away."

== Songs ==
"Rita Hayworth became an all-encompassing metaphor for everything I was thinking about while making the album. There was an autograph of hers—she had kissed a piece of paper, left a lip print on it, and underneath it said, 'My heart is in my mouth.' I loved that statement and wondered why she wrote that. There was also the fact that she was Latino and had changed her name. She had become something different, morphed herself and was trying to put something behind her. And there was the shallowness of celebrity when it's thrown upon you. All of that was going around in these songs; what had been thrown on me, things I'd never asked for. Every song on that album is about truth."

— Jack on the inspiration of Rita Hayworth.

=== Tracks 1–7 ===
Recorded near the end of the album sessions, Jack has stated in multiple interviews that "Blue Orchid" saved the album. When Jack had conceived the song, he said that the song made him want to play festivals. Basic tracking was done on March 10, 2005, with vocal overdubs completed on a later date. The song was released as the first single for the album six weeks after it was written on April 18, 2005. An Electro-Harmonix polyphonic octave generator guitar pedal was used on the track in order to achieve a heavier guitar sound, although they were limited by the amount of tracks on the tape they could use and Jack liked the octaves rather than the effects.

"The Nurse" is an experimental song, which features Jack playing a Musser M500 Concert Grand Soloist marimba. The song was first tracked with marimba and drums, with electric guitar and additional drums later overdubbed in order to mask a poor tape edit of the "No, I'm never / no, I'm never / no, I'm never gonna let you down" portion which had been recorded separately. Jack was initially hesitant about the song due to the overdubs. When Jack let Brendan Benson hear an early mix of the song, Benson said it sounded like "some Brian Wilson shit". Jack has said that the song is about someone he had been in love with for over a decade. The song was built upon a White Stripes song (which Meg didn't perform on) that had not been released, written in 2000, called "Let You Down". It was recorded in the living room. "The Nurse" would later strongly inspire the production and studio sessions of their subsequent and final album Icky Thump (2007).

"My Doorbell" was released as the second single for the album on July 11, 2005. The song has been described as being reminiscent of Motown music. The song was recorded in two takes. Jack considers it to be the only "positive" part of the album, thematically. "My Doorbell" was nominated for the Grammy Award for Best Pop Performance by a Duo or Group with Vocals in 2006.

"Forever for Her (Is Over for Me)" was written spontaneously after a phone call Jack had, after which he said the first lyric, "I blew it," and continued to find words that rhymed as well as "play with the Vs." It was one of two songs on the album containing marimba instrumentation.

"Little Ghost" is a bluegrass (and country) song which features Jack playing a Gibson F-4 mandolin which he had purchased around the time of his acting role in Cold Mountain (2003). Jack had written the song in ten minutes at a friend's house. The song was under consideration for being the third single. The song was often performed live as a duet (whereas the album version is Jack performing different vocal tracks).

"The Denial Twist" was the third and final single off the album, released on October 31, 2005. The song took the most time to record, with three takes having been recorded throughout the sessions. The song features electric bass and Jack's brother, Eddie Gillis, playing tambourine and shakers. The song's surrealist music video was directed by Michel Gondry on the set of Late Night with Conan O'Brien. The lyric "never do it with a singer 'cause he'll tell everyone in the world" is about songwriters coming up with characters based on slice of life scenarios which is further depicted in Icky Thump's ninth track "Rag and Bone".

"White Moon" is a ballad and is one of two songs that mention Rita Hayworth. On the first take of "White Moon", near the end of the song, a rack of bells can be heard crashing which was unintended. The song was originally titled "White Moon and the Red Headed Guest".

=== Tracks 8–13 ===
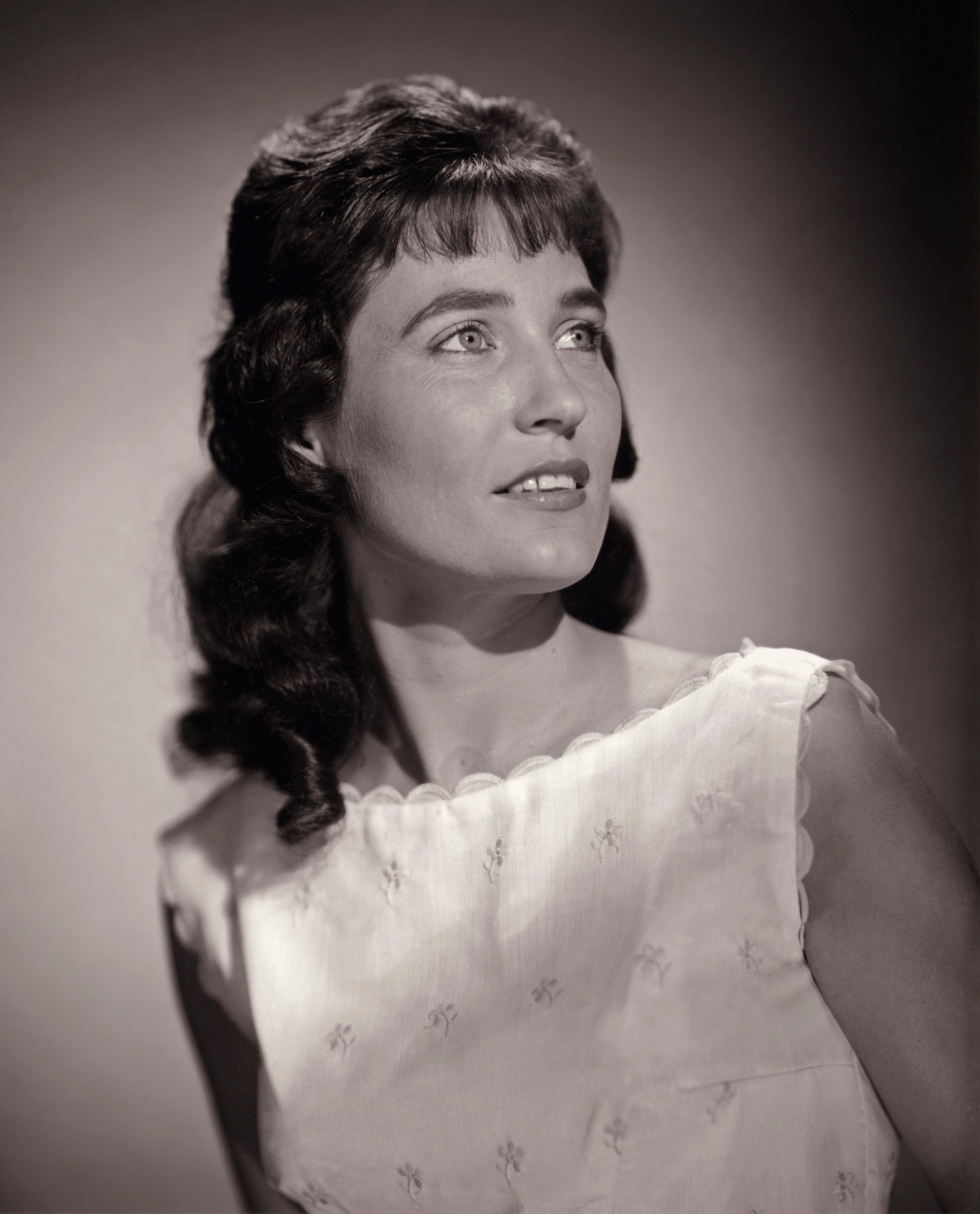
Loretta Lynn inspired the closing track "I'm Lonely (But I Ain't That Lonely Yet)"

"Instinct Blues" is a blues rock song that is about sexual frustration. A demo version of the track states that it was written in mid-September 2004. The song was also featured in Michel Gondry's film The Science of Sleep (2006). As demonstrated in a 2005 performance for Morning Becomes Eclectic, Jack would occasionally change the lyrics from "I bet your little dog gets it" to "I bet Meg's little dog gets it".

"Passive Manipulation" is the shortest song recorded by the band and features Meg on vocals. The song is written from a female perspective. Like the album's final track, critics perceived the song to have themes of "incest."

"As Ugly As I Seem" is an acoustic folk song that features Jack singing and playing an acoustic guitar and Meg playing hand drums. Similar to the studio version of debut album's track "Sugar Never Tasted So Good", the song features Jack knocking his acoustic guitar's body for percussive effect. In a 2005 appearance on Morning Becomes Eclectic, both songs were performed and for "As Ugly As I Seem", Meg used her floor tom and snare as bongos; Jack did the knocking effect on this song and omitted it in "Sugar Never Tasted So Good" respectively. "As Ugly As I Seem" was also performed on the talk show Charlie Rose that year, yet the knocking effect was omitted in that particular performance. In both performances, Jack played a 1905 Gibson L-1 Archtop guitar.

"Take, Take, Take" is about a fan who meets Rita Hayworth at a bar and keeps asking things from her. The song has been interpreted as the band's feelings towards celebrity life or even Jack's own personal obsession with Hayworth, although Jack told Mojo that the song is about "parents not teaching their kids manners." Jack had written as many as 9 or 10 verses, but had to cut some of them as the song would have been too long, comparing himself to a director cutting scenes from a film.

"Red Rain" began as a demo of Jack working out the song structure and key on guitar, piano, and bells. There was a televised performance on Late Night with Conan O'Brien in December 2005. A music video for it was released in 2025 to commemorate the 20th anniversary of Get Behind Me Satan.

The closing track, "I'm Lonely (But I Ain't That Lonely Yet)", was written shortly before the sessions, after Jack called Loretta Lynn, in which Jack made a joking comment about Meg saying, "yeah, I get lonely" to which Lynn replied, "yeah, but I ain’t that lonely yet." Jack asked Lynn if he could use the line for a song. The first take of "I'm Lonely" was recorded with mandolin, piano, Jack on vocals, and Meg on drums. A second take with only Jack singing and playing piano was chosen for the album. Some reviewers perceived the song as having themes of "incest."

=== Outtakes ===
"Ain't No Sweeter Than Rita Blues", an instrumental track, was released on a 7-inch single alongside Under Amazonian Lights through a Third Man Records Vault subscription in 2015.

"City Lights" is a folk song that was written for the album, with two takes having been recorded. The track was forgotten about until the master tapes for the album were revisited for the 2015 vinyl reissue of the album. The track was completed with Dominic Davis playing upright bass for the track and released on Jack's acoustic compilation, Acoustic Recordings 1998–2016 on September 9, 2016. In 2025, an alternate studio take and home demo was released on Get Behind Me Satan XX.

"Over and Over and Over" was initially demoed using a fuzz pedal on an electric bass. Two takes of the song were recorded for the album, but it ultimately went unreleased. Jack later attempted the song on Icky Thump and with his other side projects. The song was eventually re-recorded in 2017 and released as the third single for Jack's third solo album, Boarding House Reach on March 1, 2018. A home demo and a studio outtake of the song was released on Get Behind Me Satan XX.

On the same day that the music video for "Blue Orchid" was filmed, Coca-Cola sent Jack a treatment for a commercial, as they wanted to use "We're Going to Be Friends" in it. Jack declined, instead offering to write a brand new song which they wanted to be similar to their famous "Buy the World a Coke" jingle, that which itself was an altered version of "I'd Like to Teach the World to Sing (In Perfect Harmony)," originally performed by The Hillside Singers; he excitedly took this on as "a task" and wrote the song "Love is the Truth" in 10 minutes. Because Jack "fell in love instantly" with Karen Elson, whom director Floria Sigismondi cast in the video, he brought her to his room to show her the song. Coca-Cola were ultimately unenthusiastic about the song, to Jack's "displeasure," and only aired the commercial briefly. The song itself ended up being released on Jack's compilation album Acoustic Recordings 1998–2016.

"Top Special" was a single that was only available to some Japanese attendants of the Get Behind Me Satan Tour and only able to be played on a Bandai Triple Inchophone, of which few exist. The single was never released on another format and the singles outnumber the amount of players. It was recorded c. late August or early September 2005. The song, peformed in a childish vocal character, is based on a phrase purported to have been popular with Japanese teenagers of the time. It includes marimba and Meg on background vocals. Outside of Japan, the song was performed at least once during the tour in Portland, Oregon.

== Promotion and release ==
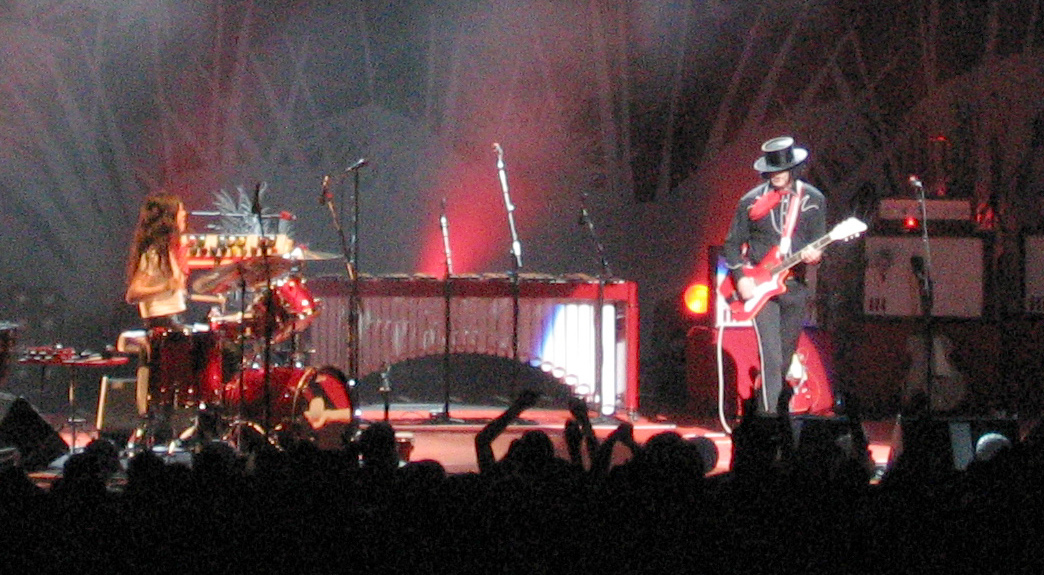
The White Stripes performing in 2005 during the Get Behind Me Satan era

The tracklist and release date of the album was announced on April 12, 2005. On the following day, a listening event was held exclusively for music journalists at Splashlight Studios in New York City. Get Behind Me Satan was then released worldwide on June 6, 2005, by XL and Third Man and on June 7, 2005, in the United States by V2 and Third Man.

Get Behind Me Satan was supported by three singles. "Blue Orchid", the album's lead single, became their second US Billboard Hot 100 single, their second top ten entry on the UK singles chart, and their first number one single on the Canadian Hot 100. The album's second and third singles, "My Doorbell" and "The Denial Twist", also reached the top ten in the United Kingdom and charted on the Modern Rock Charts.

Exclusive vinyl copies of Get Behind Me Satan were made exclusively for music journalists to review, and 600 records were released collectively by XL Recordings and V2 Records simultaneously; these have become rare and coveted collector's items. The White Stripes intended to re-record the album in January 2006 at Joe Gubay's Studio in New Zealand for a commercial vinyl release, but the studio no longer had the recording equipment to make it possible. As a result, Get Behind Me Satan was the only album by the White Stripes not to be commercially released on vinyl for ten years.

The White Stripes did minimal interviews during the press cycle of Get Behind Me Satan, having become disillusioned with reporters who constantly inquired about "lifestyle" instead of sticking to the topic of music and did not want to duplicate the amount of press they did for Elephant.

For Record Store Day 2015, Third Man Records released a limited vinyl edition with a lenticular gatefold sleeve, pressed on red and white vinyl; a commercially released version with standard artwork pressed on standard black vinyl was released later that year. Ahead of the album's 20th anniversary, the White Stripes announced a deluxe reissue of Get Behind Me Satan with alternative takes, demos, and live recordings of its tracks. On June 27, 2025, a limited edition vinyl reissue of Get Behind Me Satan and a music video for "Red Rain" were released, to celebrate the album's twentieth anniversary.

== Get Behind Me Satan Tour ==
From May to July 2005, the White Stripes toured Latin American and Eastern European countries before touring the United States for the Get Behind Me Satan Tour. The Latin American segment of the tour began in Monterrey, Mexico at the Auditorio Banamex (then known as Auditorio Coca-Cola), then went to Zapopan, (Note: Listed as Guadalajara in the media, though they are two different cities in the same metropolitan area.) and Mexico City. In Central America, they toured Guatemala City, Guatemala and Panama City, Panama. Panama City was Jack's favorite tour stop up until that point, as he felt like they won "the toughest chest match," and related it to a quote actor Dustin Hoffman made about his early acting career in having to prove his ability to play certain characters. Bogotá, Colombia; Santiago, Chile; Puerto Iguazú and Buenos Aires, Argentina followed before the White Stripes arrived in Brazil to perform in Manaus, Rio de Janeiro, and São Paulo. Before going to Russia to perform in Moscow and Saint Petersburg, the White Stripes performed in Atlanta, Georgia for Music Midtown and London, England for Glastonbury Festival. After Russia, the tour went to Tallinn, Estonia; Riga, Latvia; returned to Russia to perform in Kaliningrad; Prague, Czech Republic; Zagreb, Croatia; Ljubljana, Slovenia; Gdynia, Poland; Novi Sad, Serbia; Thessaloniki and Athens, Greece.

Jack understood touring South America before the United States was a "bad business" decision, and frequently references this tour in the scope of his career as an example of prioritizing art over business interests, but it was an enjoyable, "good business" experience to play in different markets for brand new fans, comparing it to the beginning of their touring career. For years, the White Stripes wanted to tour Mexico even if it had only been Mexico City, but were dissuaded due to the costs of transporting equipment by plane. Regardless of the financial losses, Jack felt by the time they reached Manaus, Brazil it was "the best tour [they'd] ever done." Although he would regret how the tour transpired in the United States, citing the choice of venues and a general apathy from American audiences to the level of which the White Stripes felt they were only performing for each other. The Providence, Rhode Island concert made Jack want to end the show after 25 minutes, as the audience gave an impassive response to both "St. James Infirmary Blues" and the loud rock songs. They later said they preferred playing in South American countries and should have only played there. Reflecting on the tour in late 2005, Jack additionally named Guatemala, Estonia, Latvia, and Poland as his favorite parts of the tour, whereas Meg particularly enjoyed that in other countries, the people weren't pretentious. The stop in Poland occurred on Jack's 30th birthday and the crowd sang Sto lat (the Polish version of the birthday song), which was "one of the most favorite moments of [his] life" as the song is also a tradition in his family; coincidentally that was also the 100th anniversary of Jack's Polish ancestors emigrating to the United States.

Two weeks after Athens, the White Stripes had returned to the United States to begin the American segment of the tour in Pomona and San Diego, California. In August, they went to the small town of George, Washington, then to Portland, Oregon before returning to California for multiple shows in Berkeley and Los Angeles, respectively. They then headed east to Phoenix, Arizona and north to the small town of Morrison, Colorado before heading to Missouri to do shows in Kansas City and St. Louis. Continuing in the Midwest, they did two shows in Minneapolis, Minnesota and three shows in Chicago, Illinois before Milwaukee, Wisconsin and Indianapolis, Indiana. They went to Columbus and Cincinnati, Ohio before Lexington, Kentucky, then returned to Ohio to perform in Cleveland. The next week they went to New England states to perform in Providence, Rhode Island, and to do three shows in Boston, Massachusetts. They did two shows in Brooklyn, New York City and headed south to Columbia, Maryland before heading back north to Atlantic City, New Jersey. Two days later, that portion of the tour ended with two shows in Detroit, Michigan. Two months later, in early December, they returned to California in San Francisco and Los Angeles for Christmas-themed concerts for radio stations KITS and KROQ, respectively.

The White Stripes returned to Europe that autumn to tour Paris, France; Barcelona, Spain; Bologna, Italy; Vienna, Austria; Munich, Berlin, and later Düsseldorf, Germany; Copenhagen, Denmark; Stockholm, Sweden; Brussels, Belgium; Amsterdam, The Netherlands; then to the United Kingdom, performing in London; Blackpool, Glasgow, Scotland; Manchester, England; and finally Reykjavík, Iceland. On an unspecified date during the European segment of the tour, the White Stripes performed on the first episode of From the Basement in the United Kingdom, playing "Blue Orchid", "Party of Special Things to Do" by Captain Beefheart, "Forever for Her (Is Over for Me)", "As Ugly As I Seem", "Little Ghost", and "Red Rain". In January and February 2006, they toured New Zealand and Australia for the Big Day Out festivals. While touring in Australia, they made a stop in Hobart, Tasmania, for a performance at the Hobart City Hall which became a live album. In March 2006, they did a brief tour in Japan, performing in Tokyo, Nagoya, and Osaka. The marimba was retired upon the Osaka concert.

=== Under Amazonian Lights ===
On June 1, 2005, The White Stripes performed at the Amazon Theatre which is an opera house in Manaus, Amazonas, Brazil. Earlier that day, Jack eloped with British model Karen Elson, with Meg as the maid of honor (it was her suggestion for them to marry). When the band attempted to perform "We're Going to Be Friends" (on a Gibson John Lennon J-160-E acoustic guitar and a set of bongos respectively) for the thousands of fans who were watching outside the venue, something of a riot ensued and they were rushed back in to perform "Seven Nation Army". The concert was broadcast on MTV and MTV2 in 2005, and released as a live album by Third Man Records in 2015. During the performance, an audio engineer was there to monitor the decibels in order to protect the acoustics of the opera house. In 2012, Jack said it was the best show of his life, elaborating on a related sentiment he had expressed to Mojo in 2005:

"It really, really was incredible. I loved that show, every moment of it. It didn't seem like we were on planet Earth. It was so surreal. I just couldn't believe all the components, before and afterwards, and how exciting and electric it felt. There was plaster falling from the ceiling from the volume of it. And how many thousands of people were outside who didn't get to come in. It was beautiful. I can't believe it happened."

== Reception ==
Professional ratings
Aggregate scores
Source	Rating
Metacritic	81/100
Review scores
Source	Rating
AllMusic	4/5 stars
Entertainment Weekly	C+
The Guardian	4/5 stars
Los Angeles Times	4/4 stars
NME	8/10
Pitchfork	7.3/10
Q	4/5 stars
Rolling Stone	4.5/5 stars
Spin	B
The Village Voice	A−
Blender	4/5 stars

Get Behind Me Satan received positive reviews from music critics; review aggregating website Metacritic reports a normalized score of 81 out of 100 based on 38 reviews, indicating "universal acclaim". AllMusic's Heather Phares gave the album 4 out of 5 stars, praising the experimentation but noting that "As eclectic as Get Behind Me Satan is, it isn't perfect: the energy dips a little in the middle, [...] "it takes awhile to unravel and appreciate." Rob Sheffield of Rolling Stone was similarly positive in his review and wrote, "Get Behind Me Satan could be a rock & roll remake, starring Jack and Meg as the doomed lovers. Satan, you got served." NME's Alex Needham deemed it a "very brave record" and called the White Stripes "the real, strange, artistic deal. It'll be a long time before Jack and Meg sell their souls." Contrastingly, David Browne of Entertainment Weekly gave Get Behind Me Satan a C+ and opining that "Too many of the tunes — and Jack's lyrics — are undercut by lurching, half-finished arrangements." He believed Jack was "trying too hard to be eccentric" and "nearly incomprehensible". Spin's Chuck Klosterman praised "Blue Orchid" but criticized the experimentation and themes, likening the album to "an art film that ignores narrative".

At the 48th Annual Grammy Awards in 2006, Get Behind Me Satan won for Best Alternative Album and was nominated for Best Pop Performance by a Duo or Group with Vocals ("My Doorbell"). Also in 2006, the album was included in 1001 Albums You Must Hear Before You Die, edited by Robert Dimery; it was removed the next year. It was voted the sixth best album of the year in the 2006 Village Voice Pazz & Jop critic poll, with "My Doorbell" being voted as the year's ninth best single. Rolling Stone also ranked it the third best album of the year in 2006.

Commercially, Get Behind Me Satan entered the US Billboard 200 and UK Albums Chart at number three, and entered the top ten of seven other territories. It sold over 920,000 copies in the United States, receiving a gold certification from the Recording Industry Association of America (RIAA). It was certified platinum by the Australian Recording Industry Association (ARIA), British Phonographic Industry (BPI) and Music Canada (MC) for its respective sales in Australia, the United Kingdom, and Canada.

== Track listing ==
All lyrics are written by Jack White; all music is composed by Jack White and Meg White.

Get Behind Me Satan track listing
No.	Title	Length
1.	"Blue Orchid"	2:37
2.	"The Nurse"	3:47
3.	"My Doorbell"	4:01
4.	"Forever for Her (Is Over for Me)"	3:15
5.	"Little Ghost"	2:18
6.	"The Denial Twist"	2:35
7.	"White Moon"	4:01
8.	"Instinct Blues"	4:16
9.	"Passive Manipulation"	0:35
10.	"Take, Take, Take"	4:22
11.	"As Ugly as I Seem"	4:10
12.	"Red Rain"	3:52
13.	"I'm Lonely (But I Ain't That Lonely Yet)"	4:19
Total length:		44:07

=== Notes ===
- The Japanese release of Get Behind Me Satan features "Who's a Big Baby?" and "Though I Hear You Calling, I Will Not Answer" as bonus tracks. (Note: "Though I Hear You Calling, I Will Not Answer" contains a brief snippet of Meg's voice from "The Singing of Silent Night", but it is one of two officially released White Stripes songs that does not feature Meg at all.) Both songs appear on the Aside From That And Besides This version of The White Stripes Greatest Hits. Both songs feature marimba.
- Get Behind Me Satan features an alternate track sequencing on vinyl releases.

== Personnel ==
Credits are adapted from the album's liner notes and single releases.

The White Stripes

- Jack White – guitar, vocals, piano, bass, mandolin, marimba, tambourine, production, mixing
- Meg White – drums, vocals, percussion, bells, triangle, bongos

Additional personnel

- Eddie Gillis – tambourine and shakers (track 6)
- Howie Weinberg – mastering
- Roger Lian – sequencing
- John Hampton – mixing
- Adam Hill – assistant mixing
- Matthew Kettle – engineering

Artwork

- Arthole – layout
- "The Third Man" – design
- Ewen Spencer – photography
- Nick Pavey – photo assistant

== Charts ==
=== Weekly charts ===
Weekly chart performance for Get Behind Me Satan
Chart (2005)	Peak position
Australian Albums (ARIA)	3
Austrian Albums (Ö3 Austria)	12
Belgian Albums (Ultratop Flanders)	3
Belgian Albums (Ultratop Wallonia)	11
Canadian Albums (Billboard)	3
Danish Albums (Hitlisten)	12
Dutch Albums (Album Top 100)	13
Finnish Albums (Suomen virallinen lista)	13
French Albums (SNEP)	7
German Albums (Offizielle Top 100)	5
Irish Albums (IRMA)	3
Italian Albums (FIMI)	15
New Zealand Albums (RMNZ)	3
Norwegian Albums (VG-lista)	3
Spanish Albums (Promusicae)	36
Swedish Albums (Sverigetopplistan)	8
Swiss Albums (Schweizer Hitparade)	8
UK Albums (Official Charts)	3
UK Independent Albums (Official Charts)	1
US Billboard 200	3

=== Year-end charts ===
Year-end chart performance for Get Behind Me Satan
Chart (2005)	Position
Australian Albums (ARIA)	72
Belgian Albums (Ultratop Flanders)	34
French Albums (SNEP)	157
UK Albums (OCC)	57
US Billboard 200	110

== Certifications ==
Certifications and sales for Get Behind Me Satan
Region	Certification	Certified units/sales
Australia (ARIA)	Platinum	70,000^{^}
Belgium (BRMA)	Gold	25,000^{*}
Canada (Music Canada)	Platinum	100,000^{^}
New Zealand (RMNZ)	Platinum	15,000^{^}
Poland	—	20,000
United Kingdom (BPI)	Platinum	300,000^{^}
United States (RIAA)	Gold	920,000
^{*} Sales figures based on certification alone.^{^} Shipments figures based on certification alone.
