= Ben Blackwell =

American drummer

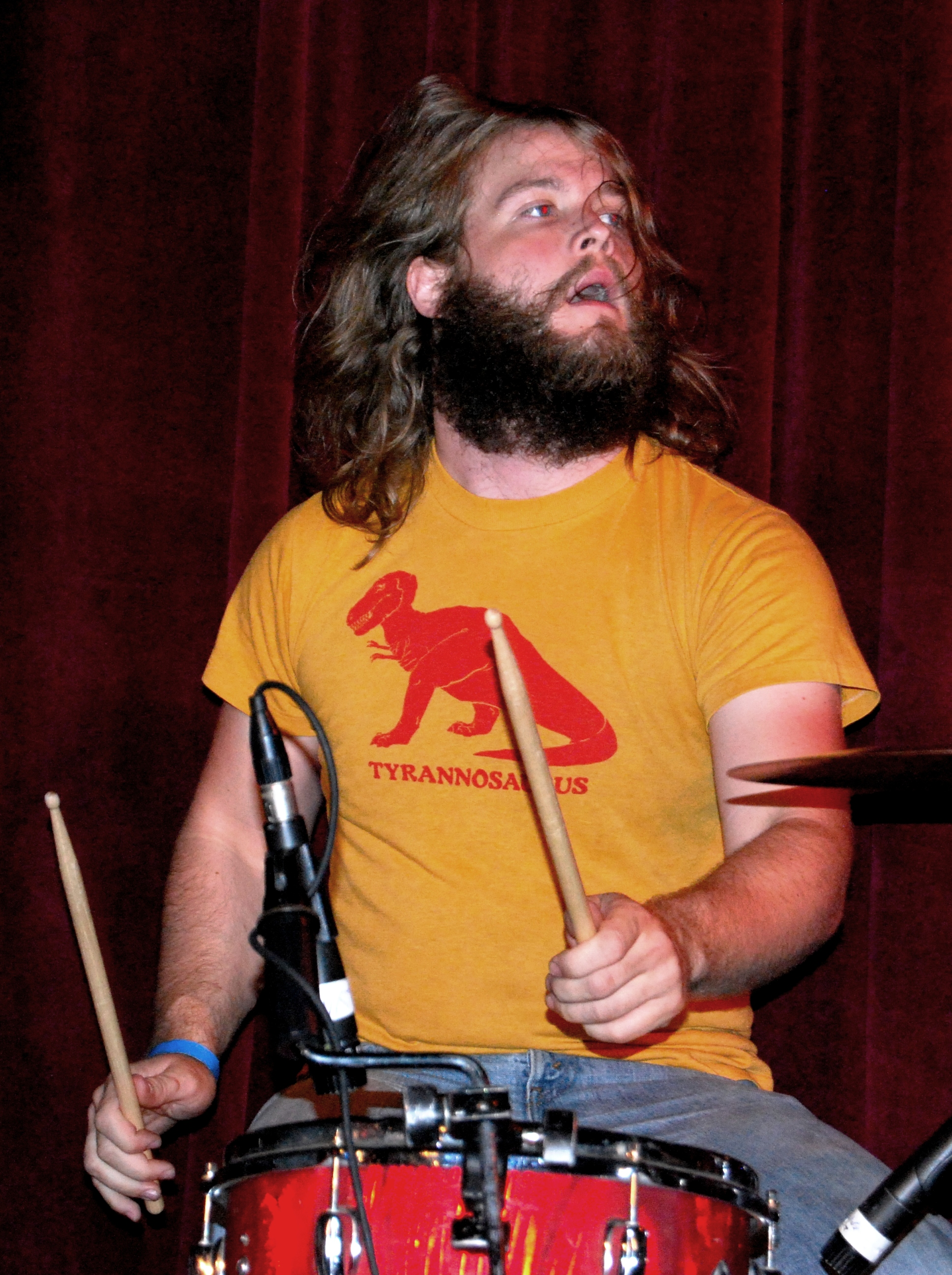
- Ben Blackwell, member of The Dirtbombs

Background information
- Born: Benjamin Jesse Blackwell; June 12, 1982 (age 44); Detroit, Michigan, U.S.
- Origin: Detroit, Michigan, U.S.
- Genres: Garage rock, rock and roll
- Occupations: drummer, writer, archivist
- Years active: 1999–present
- Labels: Cass Records, Third Man Records

Benjamin Jesse Blackwell (born June 12, 1982) is an American musician, writer, and record company executive. He is the creator and director of Cass Records, one of two drummers in the Detroit-based rock band The Dirtbombs, a co-founder and minority owner at Third Man Records, and the official archivist of The White Stripes.

== Personal life ==
Ben Blackwell was born in Detroit, Michigan, on June 12, 1982, to Maureen Gillis and Morris Blackwell. He is the nephew of Jack White, whose birth name is John Gillis. He attended Wayne State University for three years, with a concentration in journalism, before withdrawing.

Blackwell is married with three children and currently lives in Nashville, TN.

== Recording career ==
=== The Dirtbombs ===
Blackwell debuted live with The Dirtbombs on December 18, 1999, when he was only 17 years old. According to Blackwell, Mick Collins (from The Dirtbombs) called Jack White and let him know they were looking for a drummer; White put his nephew on the phone. Blackwell has since become one of the longest-serving members of the band, having played on four studio albums and having toured extensively all over the world.

=== Cass records ===
Cass is kind of just trying to be a Detroit record label that really just focuses on 7-inch singles. It's my favorite format for recorded music. It kind of has been the premiere medium for upcoming artists since Elvis put out "That's All Right" in 1954.

— Ben Blackwell with Crain's Detroit magazine, 2007

Beginning in 2003 with money given to him by his mother, Blackwell has put out over 50 releases on his Cass Records imprint. Instead of signing artists, he makes one-time deals to release their songs as singles. His label received some fame with the release of the song "Who's to Say..." from the country-rock band Blanche. Through his label he has also released records from such artists as The Mooney Suzuki, The Waxwings, The Trachtenburg Family Slide Show Players, The Sights, The Muldoons, Kelley Stoltz, Dan Sartain, Turbo Fruits, Cheap Time, The Go, the Black Lips and many others.

In 2007, Blackwell was selected by Crain's Detroit Business magazine as one of their "Twenty in Their 20s", a yearly designation given to twenty emerging entrepreneurs in southeastern Michigan. Blackwell was selected because of his work with his Cass Records label and was recognized for his commitment to the 7-inch vinyl format.

=== Solo career ===
In November 2010, Blackwell self-released his debut solo album "I Remember When All This Was Trees" on his Cass Records imprint. Blackwell wrote, recorded and performed all the music on the album.

In March 2011 Blackwell participated in Esquire magazine's annual songwriting challenge along with Dierks Bentley, Dhani Harrison, Raphael Saadiq and Brendan Benson. Each performer was asked to write a song using the lyric "Last night in Detroit" and Blackwell's song "Bury My Body at Elmwood" is based around Elmwood Cemetery on the east side of Detroit.

== Writing ==
Blackwell has written for many magazines including Creem Magazine Online, Careless Talk Costs Lives, the Metro Times, Chunklet Magazine, Ugly Things, Arthur, Plan B and others.

Blackwell has also contributed work to the following books:

- The White Stripes and the Sound of Mutant Blues by Everett True
- The Art of the Band T-Shirt by Amber Easby
- The Stooges: The Authorized and Illustrated Story by Robert Matheu
- Re-Entry: The Orbit Magazine Anthology by Rob St. Mary
- Heaven Was Detroit: From Jazz to Hip Hop and Beyond edited by M.L. Liebler
- Total Chaos: The Story of the Stooges / As Told By Iggy Pop by Jeff Gold
- RESPECT: The Poetry of Detroit Music by M.L. Liebler and Jim Daniels

Blackwell won Rolling Stone magazine's 2004 College Journalism Award in the field of entertainment for two tour diaries he wrote for Wayne State University's The South End paper in March 2003.

In November 2006 Blackwell started his own blog titled Tremble Under Boom Lights named after an EP by the band Jonathan Fire*Eater.

Blackwell's poem The World's Most Important Swimmers was selected by members of the Guerilla Poetics Project to be printed as a letterpressed broadside for the November 2008 installment of their program.

Since 2007 Blackwell has been a frequent contributor to Bagazine, a Mail Art "magazine in a bag" that focuses on "assemblage, handwork and print making, photography, painting, chapbooks, graphic design, typography, letterpress, Visual Poetry and the unusual."

In March 2010 an anonymous guerilla stickering campaign was started in Detroit asking "Where is Ben Blackwell?" Bumper stickers with this message can still be found in the Midtown neighborhood.

On March 1, 2014, Blackwell gave a lecture at the Museum of Fine Arts, Boston titled "A Contemporary Record of Rock 'n' Roll" covering topics ranging from vinyl records, archiving, musical archeology and his personal experiences relating to them.

== Work with The White Stripes ==
From the beginning of the Stripes' existence, Blackwell worked as the band's roadie and wrote much of the group's website content. Although he is not an accredited professional archivist, he is the "White Stripes' official archivist". He wrote the liner notes to Under Blackpool Lights. He also appears in The White Stripes' feature-length documentary Under Great White Northern Lights, conducting the interview that is interlaced throughout the film.

With funding for music education being cut every day, Third Man feels a duty to do its part. What better way to do so than to record the kids themselves and put 'em on vinyl?

— Ben Blackwell, ThirdManRecords.com

Currently, Blackwell oversees vinyl record production at Jack White's Third Man Records in Nashville, Tennessee, where his official job title is "Pinball Wizard and Director of Operations." He is involved in the program School Choirs & Bands at Third Man: A Vinyl Recording Experience, an initiative which, according to the website, offers "students behind-the-scenes access to Jack White's Third Man Records in Nashville, TN, as well as the chance to record their own " 45 rpm vinyl records."

== Discography ==
=== With The Dirtbombs ===
==== Albums ====
Year	Title	Label	Notes
2001	Ultraglide in Black	In The Red Records	
2003	Dangerous Magical Noise	In The Red Records	
2008	We Have You Surrounded	In The Red Records	
2011	Party Store	In The Red Records	

==== Compilations ====
Year	Title	Label	Notes
2005	If You Don't Already Have a Look	In The Red Records	
2013	Consistency is the Enemy	Cass Records	

==== 7" singles ====
- Headlights on 7" (Solid Sex Lovie Doll Records, 2000)
- Brucia I Cavi 7" (Hate Records, 2000)
- Ode to a Black Man 7" (Sweet Nothing, 2001)
- Australian Sing A Long with the Dirtbomb Singers 7" (Zerox Records, 2002)
- Pray For Pills 7" (Corduroy Records, 2002)
- Motor City Baby 7" (Sweet Nothing, 2003)
- Earthquake Heart 7" (Velvet Tiger, 2004)
- Merit 7" (Kapow Records, 2004)
- Crashdown Day 7" (Corduroy Records, 2004)
- Tanzen Gehn' 7" (Soundflat Records, 2005)
- Brand New Game 7" (Munster Records, 2005)
- Oh Katrina 7" (Noiseless/Live From Detroit, 2007)
- Rocket USA 7" (Infirmary Phonographic, 2008)
- Need You Tonight 7" (Stained Circles, 2008)
- The Dirtbombs... Play Sparks 7" (In The Red Records, 2008)
- Race to the Bottom 12" (Cass Records, 2009)
- Kick Me 7" (Cass Records, 2010)

==== The Dirtbombs split recordings with other artists ====
- "King's Led Hat", with The Gories (Fortune Teller Records, 2004)
- "Lost Love", with ADULT. (Cass Records/Ersatz Audio, 2004)
- "Billiards at Nine-Thirty", with King Khan and the Shrines (Sounds of Subterrania, 2004)
- "No Expectations", with The Love Supremes (Norton Records, 2005)
- "Missionary Man", with The Black Lips (Cass Records, 2006)
- "Kung Fu", with the Voltaire Brothers and Pitch Black City (Mahogani Music, 2007)
- "Politicians in My Eyes", with Kelley Stoltz (Cass Records, 2008)
- "Politicians in My Eyes", with The Terrible Twos and Dan Sartain (Cass Records, 2008)
- "Secret Code", with Davila 666 (Scion Audio Visual, 2010)
- "If Can Can Can't We?", with Fucked Up (Bruise Cruise Records/453 Music, 2012)

=== Solo discography ===
Year	Title	Label	Notes
2010	I Remember When All This Was Trees (album)	Cass Records	all vocals and instrumentation
2011	"Bury My Body at Elmwood"	Cass Records	all vocals and instrumentation

=== Collaborations ===
Artist	Year	Title	Label	Notes
Mike Quatro	1995	"The Ocean Song"	Quatrophonic Music USA	uncredited group vocal
Clone Defects	1999	"Bottled Woman"	Tom Perkins Records	uncredited reverb crash
Lost Kids	2001	"Explode" & "Whirling Dervish"	Gold Standard Laboratories	drums
The Mistreaters	2003	"Ol' Sugarfoot"	Estrus	guitar feedback
Detroit City Council	2003	"Mary's Lil Lamb"	Acid Jazz	drums
The Come-Ons	2005	"Promise Me"	Unrecording Records	guitar solo
Dan Sartain	2008	"Voodoo"	Cass Records	drums
Jack White	2011	"Love is Blindness"	Third Man Records	drums
Jack White	2013	"Alone in My Home" & "Entitlement"	Third Man Records	drums
Jack White	2014	"I'm Down"	Capitol Records	drums
Olivia Jean	2019	"Night Owl"	Third Man Records	drums
