= Tied & True =

Studio album by The Detroit Cobras
- Released: April 24, 2007
- Genre: Garage soul
- Label: Bloodshot

The Detroit Cobras chronology
Baby (2005)	Tied & True (2007)	The Original Recordings (2008)

Professional ratings
Review scores
Source	Rating
AllMusic	link
Pitchfork Media	76% link
Rolling Stone	link
PopMatters	link

Tied & True is the fourth album by the Detroit Cobras, released 24 April 2007. It is the final album that features vocalist Rachel Nagy, who later died in 2022.

== Track listing ==
1. As Long as I Have You
  - Original by Garnett Mimms
2. Nothing but a Heartache
  - Original by The Flirtations
3. (If You Don't Think) You Better Change
  - Original by Tammy Montgomery
4. Leave My Kitten Alone
  - Original by Little Willie John
5. (I Wanna Know) What's Going On
  - Original by Art Neville
6. Try Love
  - Original by Dori Grayson
7. You'll Never Change
  - Original by Betty Lavett
8. Puppet on a String
  - Original by Gino Washington
9. Only To Other People
  - Original by The Cookies
10. The Hurt's All Gone
  - Original by Irma Thomas
11. It's My Delight
  - Original by The Melodians
12. On a Monday
  - Original by Lead Belly
13. Green Light
  - Original by The Equals

== Personnel ==
=== The Detroit Cobras ===
- Rachel Nagy: Vocals, Piano
- Maribel (Mary) Restrepo: Guitar
- Kenny Tudrick: Guitar, Drums
- Greg Cartwright: Guitar, Percussion
- Carol Schumacher: Bass

=== Additional Personnel ===
- Eddie Hawrysch - Additional Piano
- Ryan Pritts - Timpani and Additional Backing Vocals on "Green Light"
- Ko Shih - Additional Bass
- Jeliana Frelitz - Additional Backing Vocals on "Green Light"
- Melissa Glush - Additional Backing Vocals on "Green Light"
