= Baby (The Detroit Cobras album) =

Studio album by The Detroit Cobras
- Released: Sept 27, 2005
- Genre: Garage soul, punk blues
- Label: Bloodshot

The Detroit Cobras chronology
Life, Love and Leaving (2001)	Baby (2005)	Tied & True (2007)

Professional ratings
Review scores
Source	Rating
Allmusic	3.5/5 stars
BBC	favorable
PopMatters	5/10 stars
Splendid	favorable
Tiny Mix Tapes	3.5/5 marks

Baby is the third studio album by The Detroit Cobras. It was originally released in the United Kingdom by Rough Trade Records in November 2004. The following year Bloodshot Records released the album in the United States. Bloodshot's release included the Seven Easy Pieces EP in its entirety.

== Track listing ==
1. "Slipping Around"
  - Original by Art Freeman
2. "I Wanna Holler (But the Town's Too Small)"
  - Original by Gary U.S. Bonds
3. "Baby Let Me Hold Your Hand"
  - Original by Hoagy Lands
4. "Weak Spot"
  - Original by Ruby Johnson
5. "Everybody's Going Wild"
  - Original by International Kansas City Playboys
6. "Hot Dog (Watch Me Eat)"
  - The lone original song. Composed by Greg Cartwright/Mary Restrepo/Rachel Nagy
7. "Mean Man"
  - Original by Betty Harris
8. "Now You're Gone"
  - Original by Bobbie Smith & the Dreamgirls
9. "It's Raining"
  - Original by Irma Thomas
10. "Just Can't Please You"
  - Original by Jimmy Robins
11. "The Real Thing"
  - Original by The "5" Royales
12. "Baby Help Me"
  - Original by Percy Sledge
13. "Cha Cha Twist"
  - Original by Brice Coefield

== Personnel ==
- Rachel Nagy - Vocals
- Maribel (Mary) Ramirez - Guitar
- Joey Mazzola - Bass
- Steve Nawara - Guitar
- Kenny Tudrick - Percussion, Drums
