= If You Don't Already Have a Look =

Compilation album by The Dirtbombs
- Released: May 31, 2005
- Genre: Rock
- Label: In the Red

The Dirtbombs chronology
Dangerous Magical Noise (2003)	If You Don't Already Have a Look (2005)	We Have You Surrounded (2008)

Professional ratings
Review scores
Source	Rating
Allmusic	4/5 stars
Mojo	3/5 stars
Pitchfork	82%
PopMatters	9/10 stars
Spin	A−
Stylus Magazine	B+
Uncut Magazine	4/5 stars

If You Don't Already Have a Look is a compilation album by the American rock music group The Dirtbombs.

The first disc of the album is all original songs by the Dirtbombs while the second disc is all cover songs. The title of the album comes from a memo sent from Little Steven to bands participating in a festival that will be broadcast worldwide on television and recommends "If your band does not have a "look" this might be a good time to consider it.".

== Track listing ==
=== Disc one ===
All tracks are written by Mick Collins, except where noted.

No.	Title	Writer(s)	Length
1.	"Theme from the Dirtbombs"		1:15
2.	"The Sharpest Claws"		2:17
3.	"Stuck Under My Shoe"		2:30
4.	"I'm Saving Myself for Nichelle Nichols (No. 3)"		0:57
5.	"Here Comes That Sound Again"	Collins, Pat Pantano	4:28
6.	"High Octane Salvation"		2:13
7.	"Cedar Point '76"	Collins, Jim Diamond	2:12
8.	"Little Miss Chocolate Syrup"	Collins, Diamond	3:03
9.	"Headlights On"		1:50
10.	"Never Licking You Again"		1:30
11.	"Don't Bogue My High"		2:15
12.	"Encrypted"		2:39
13.	"(I'm Not Your) Scratchin' Post"		2:15
14.	"Broke in Detroit (Again)"		2:41
15.	"Merit"		2:48
16.	"Trainwreck"		1:52
17.	"Infra-Red"		2:17
18.	"Jolene"	Ben Blackwell, Diamond, Pantano, Tom Potter	1:57
19.	"Candyass"		2:51
20.	"Pray for Pills"	Collins, Diamond	3:12
21.	"All My Friends"		3:00
22.	"She Played Me Like a Booger"		1:59
23.	"They Hate Us in Scandinavia"		1:36
24.	"They Saved Einstein's Brain"		1:50
25.	"Correspondence"		2:18
26.	"Tina Louise"		2:46
27.	"Brucia I Cavit"		0:57
28.	"Words That Hurt"		1:54
29.	"My Last Christmas"	Collins, Diamond	2:34

=== Disc two ===
No.	Title	Writer(s)	Original Artist	Length
1.	"Possession"	Dana Hatch, David Shannon	Cheater Slicks	3:53
2.	"Maybe Your Baby"	Stevie Wonder		4:26
3.	"Brand New Game"	Elliott Smith		3:13
4.	"I'll Be in Trouble"	Smokey Robinson	The Miracles	2:11
5.	"Lupita Screams"	Jeffrey Lee Pierce	The Gun Club	3:21
6.	"By My Side"	Fiorini, Heenan, Rowe, Van Burkel	The Elois	3:22
7.	"No Expectations"	Mick Jagger, Keith Richards	The Rolling Stones, The Residents (simultaneous addition of The Beatles' Hey Jude)	4:16
8.	"I Feel Good"	Rokko	One the Juggler	2:31
9.	"Natural Man"	Sandy Baron, Bobby Hebb	Lou Rawls	3:08
10.	"Noise in This World"	Roger Charlery, Andy Cox, Everett Morton, David Steele, Dave Wakeling	English Beat	2:44
11.	"Kiss Kiss Kiss"	Yoko Ono		3:26
12.	"Refried Dreams"	Hatch, Shannon	Cheater Slicks	2:53
13.	"Insecure Me"	Marc Almond, David Ball	Soft Cell	2:05
14.	"Mystified"	Coz Canler, Wally Palmar, Mike Skill	The Romantics	3:24
15.	"My Love for You"	Libran, Scroggins	ESG	1:53
16.	"You Don't Mean It"	Ohio Players		2:48
17.	"I Want, Need, Love You"	Alan Oloman	Black Diamonds	3:41
18.	"Ha Ha Ha"	Flipper		2:33
19.	"Tanzen Gehn"	Hirschburger, Lohr, Zundel	Hubert Kah	2:18
20.	"Crash Down Day"	C. Phillips	Cass Phillips	2:30
21.	"Lost Love"	Nicola Kuperus, Adam Lee Miller	ADULT.	4:44
22.	"What You've Got"	J. Ellison	Soul Brothers Six	3:21
23.	"I Started a Joke"	Barry Gibb, Maurice Gibb, Robin Gibb	The Bee Gees	3:20
