= We Have You Surrounded =

Studio album by The Dirtbombs
- Released: 2008
- Recorded: Summer 2007
- Genre: Rock
- Label: In the Red
- Producer: Mick Collins

The Dirtbombs chronology
If You Don't Already Have a Look (2005)	We Have You Surrounded (2008)	Party Store (2011)

Professional ratings
Review scores
Source	Rating
Allmusic	4/5 stars
Dusted	(favorable)
Ktsch	6.5/10 stars
Pitchfork	(7.1/10)
PopMatters	8/10 stars
Time Out	3/6 stars

We Have You Surrounded is the fourth album by the American rock music group The Dirtbombs.

== Production ==
Recording of We Have You Surrounded, began in November 2006 as a five song EP. The length of time since the band's last full-length, 2003's Dangerous Magical Noise, led to the decision to finish it as an LP, once again postponing the band's long-planned bubblegum record. Recording resumed in the summer of 2007, and We Have You Surrounded was released in February 2008. Far from being a bubblegum record, the album's themes are dark, based on Alan Moore's "Leopard Man at C & A'", which is described by Collins as "a fabulous take on urban paranoia".

Two cover songs were recorded for We Have you Surrounded. The first being the new wave song "Sherlock Holmes", originally by the band Sparks from the album Angst in My Pants (1982). The second cover was of the song "Fire in the Western World" by the garage rock band Dead Moon.

The cover illustration and lettering were done by Gary Panter.

== Track listing ==
All tracks are written by Mick Collins, except where noted.

No.	Title	Writer(s)	Length
1.	"It's Not Fun Until They See You Cry"		2:36
2.	"Ever Lovin Man"		2:45
3.	"Indivisible"		3:06
4.	"Sherlock Holmes"	Ron Mael, Russell Mael	3:27
5.	"Wreck My Flow"		5:11
6.	"Leopardman at C&A"	Alan Moore	4:17
7.	"Fire in the Western World"	Fred Cole	3:17
8.	"Pretty Princess Day"		2:38
9.	"I Hear the Sirens"		2:28
10.	"They Have Us Surrounded"		3:03
11.	"Race to the Bottom"		8:21
12.	"La Fin du Monde"	Collins, MacConaill	4:16

== Personnel ==
- Ben Blackwell — Performer
- Mick Collins — Producer, Performer
- Troy Gregory — Performer
- Jim Kissling — Engineer, Mixing
- Chris Koltay — Engineer
- Erik Maluchnik — Engineer
- Patrick Pantano — Performer
- Ko Melina Zydeco — Performer
