= Party Store =

Studio album by The Dirtbombs
- Released: February 1, 2011
- Genre: Garage punk
- Label: In the Red

The Dirtbombs chronology
We Have You Surrounded (2008)	Party Store (2011)

Party Store is the fifth studio album by American garage rock band The Dirtbombs, released on February 1, 2011. The album was released on the In The Red Records label.

== Background ==
Party Store is the fifth full-length LP for The Dirtbombs and their second cover album. The tracks are all covers of classic Detroit techno songs by luminaries of the genre such as Juan Atkins and Derrick May. Comparing it to their 2001 covers album Ultraglide in Black, Mick Collins has said, "The major difference ... is that 'Ultraglide' was planned and 'Party Store' was not. 'Ultraglide' was an attempt to show that those were valid rock songs, that it didn't matter what the source was — anything can be made a rock song. We had set out to prove something. 'Party Store' was actually an experiment to see if those songs could be done in a different context. 'Ultraglide' was a statement, whereas 'Party Store' was a question.

== Reception ==
Professional ratings
Aggregate scores
Source	Rating
Metacritic	70/100
Review scores
Source	Rating
AllMusic	4/5 stars
Pitchfork Media	(6.8/10)
PopMatters	(9/10)
Rolling Stone	3.5/5 stars

The album received a score of 70 out of 100 on Metacritic, indicating generally favorable reviews.

== Track listing ==
No.	Title	Writer(s)	Original artist	Length
1.	"Cosmic Cars"	Juan Atkins, Rick Davis	Cybotron	3:39
2.	"Shari Vari"	Sterling Jones, Paul Lesley, Roderick Simpson, Keith Tucker	A Number of Names	5:35
3.	"Good Life"	Roy Holman, Shanna Jackson, Kevin Saunderson	Inner City	5:26
4.	"Strings of Life"	Michael James, Derrick May	Rhythim Is Rhythim	6:18
5.	"Alleys of Your Mind"	Juan Atkins, Rick Davis	Cybotron	3:48
6.	"Bug in the Bass Bin"	Carl Craig	Innerzone Orchestra	21:22
7.	"Jaguar"	Mike Banks, Gerald Mitchell, Roland Rocha	The Aztec Mystic	5:23
8.	"Tear The Club Up"	Craig Adams	DJ Assault	1:42
9.	"謎のミスタ-ナイソ(Detoroito Mix)"	Mick Collins	The Dirtbombs	6:34
Total length:				59:41
