= Pitchfork Music Festival 2010 =

Music festival

- Dates: July 16–18, 2010
- Locations: Union Park, Chicago, United States
- Website: pitchforkmusicfestival.com

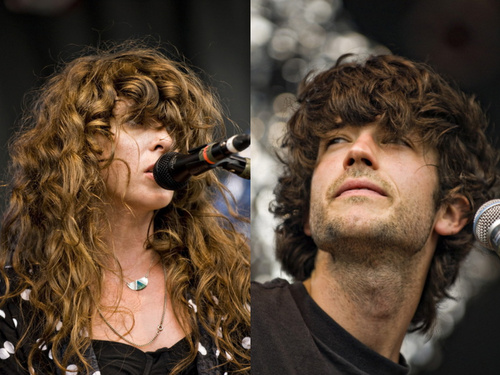
Victoria Legrand and Alex Scally in Union Park performing at the 2010 Pitchfork Music Festival in Chicago

The Pitchfork Music Festival 2010 was held on July 16 to 18, 2010 at the Union Park, Chicago, United States. The festival was headlined by Modest Mouse, LCD Soundsystem and Pavement.

== Lineup ==
Headline performers are listed in boldface. Artists listed from latest to earliest set times.

Aluminum Stage
Friday, July 16	Saturday, July 17	Sunday, July 18
**Modest Mouse**; Robyn; El-P; Sharon Van Etten	**LCD Soundsystem**; Wolf Parade; Raekwon; Delorean; Free Energy	**Pavement**; Major Lazer; Lightning Bolt; Girls; Allá

Balance Stage
Friday, July 16 (Note: The Balance Stage on Friday hosted stand-up comedians.)	Saturday, July 17	Sunday, July 18
Eugene Mirman; Michael Showalter; Wyatt Cenac; Hannibal Buress	Freddie Gibbs; Bear in Heaven; WHY? Smith Westerns; Dâm-Funk; Kurt Vile; Sonny & the Sunsets (Note: Swedish band jj were set to perform but cancelled and replaced by Sonny & the Sunsets.); Netherfriends	Sleigh Bells; Neon Indian; Here We Go Magic; Surfer Blood; Local Natives; Washed Out; Best Coast; Cave

Connector Stage
Friday, July 16	Saturday, July 17	Sunday, July 18
Broken Social Scene; Liars; The Tallest Man on Earth	Panda Bear; Jon Spencer Blues Explosion; Titus Andronicus; Real Estate	Big Boi; St. Vincent; Beach House; Cass McCombs
