= The Cross and the Switchblade (album) =

Studio album by Bantam Rooster
- Released: March 23, 1999
- Genre: Garage punk
- Length: 33:54
- Label: Crypt
- Producer: Jim Diamond

Bantam Rooster chronology
| Deal Me In (1997) | The Cross and the Switchblade (1999) | Bless Mess (2000) |

Professional ratings
Review scores
| Source | Rating |
|---|---|
| AllMusic | 4.5/5 stars |

The Cross and the Switchblade is a studio album by the garage punk band Bantam Rooster. The album is heavier and more frantic than their debut album, Deal Me In.

== Production ==
The album was produced by Jim Diamond.

== Critical reception ==
The Province wrote that the band "rocks ridiculously hard." The Detroit News called the album "a 16-track slab of the yowling, ballistic, tag-team R&B." Exclaim! thought that "T. Jackson Potter’s tight, frenzied guitar playing and yelping vocals drive the album along and it’s on winners like 'Safe Cracker', 'Tom Skinner' and 'Outta My Mind' that he really lets loose." Westword deemed it "a downright wicked collection of shifty, soulful garage-blues freakouts."

== Track listing ==
All songs written by Eric Cook and T. Jackson Potter.

1. "Safe Cracker" - 1:27
2. "Soul-Phisticate" - 2:04
3. "Goin' Cold" - 2:20
4. "Intro Thang" - 1:06
5. "New Life" - 3:50
6. "Outta My Mind" - 2:11
7. "Tom Skinner" - 2:30
8. "You Ain't the Boss of Me" - 1:44
9. "She Stalker" - 2:04
10. "Shot Down" - 2:14
11. "Cat Fight" - 1:17
12. "Ghost" - 2:30
13. "Hey Bartendress" - 2:28
14. "Pony Up" - 2:24
15. "Electricity" - 1:24
16. "Crazy" - 2:11
