= Antique Glow =

Studio album by Kelley Stoltz
- Released: 2001
- Length: 45:54
- Label: Jack Pine Social Club

Kelley Stoltz chronology
The Past Was Faster (1999)	Antique Glow (2001)	Crock-O-Dials (2001)

Antique Glow is a 2002 album by San Francisco musician Kelley Stoltz.

As with Stoltz's previous album, The Past Was Faster, Stoltz once again played all the instruments and recorded the album in his apartment, this time on a Tascam 388 1/4" reel-to-reel tape recorder.

A hundred copies of the album, each with a hand-painted cover, were released on 12" LP records. The album was released on CD by Jack Pine Social Club in the U.S. and on Raoul Records in Australia.

A 20th-anniversary vinyl reissue with 14 bonus tracks including music from his 2003 Australian Tour record was released in November 2021 by Third Man Records.

== Track listing ==
1. "Perpetual Night" – 5:15
2. "Crystal Ball" – 2:31
3. "Jewel of the Evening" – 2:09
4. "Underwater's Where the Action Is" – 3:27
5. "One Thousand Rainy Days" – 4:40
6. "Tubes in the Moonlight" – 2:58
7. "26th Street Floor" – 0:42
8. "Are You Electric?" – 2:55
9. "Please Visit Soon" – 3:47
10. "Listen Darkly/Fake Day" – 4:31
11. "Mean Marianne" – 5:44
12. "Mt. Fuji" – 4:00
13. "My Silver Lining" – 3:15
