= The Dirtbombs =

American garage rock band

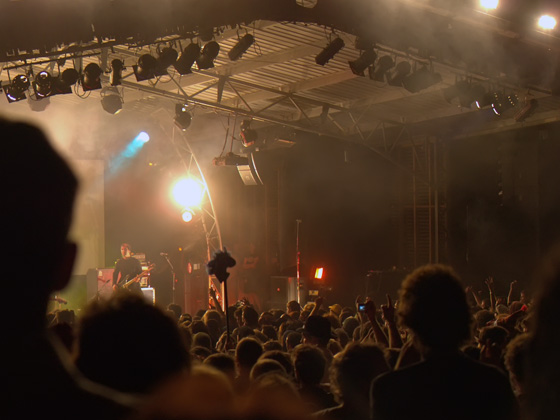
- Golden Plains Festival, Australia March 2008

Background information
- Origin: Detroit, Michigan, U.S.
- Genres: Garage rock, garage punk, punk blues
- Years active: 1992–present
- Labels: In the Red; In-Fidelity (Australia) various
- Members: Mick Collins; Ko Melina; Troy Gregory; Ben Blackwell
- Past members: See below
- Website: dirtbombs.net

The Dirtbombs are an American garage rock band based in Detroit, Michigan, notable for blending diverse influences such as punk rock and soul, while featuring a dual bass guitar, dual drum and guitar lineup. The Dirtbombs were formed by Mick Collins (of the influential garage punk band The Gories) as a side project and started recording songs by 1995.

== History ==
In the nearly two decades since its conception, The Dirtbombs has been home to many Detroit rock musicians, both in the studio and on the road. As of September 2008 the band's lineup consists of Collins on guitar, Troy Gregory on bass guitar, Ko Melina (formerly of Ko & The Knockouts) on a distorted "fuzz" baritone guitar and Ben Blackwell (owner of record label Cass Records) and Pat Pantano (formerly of the Come Ons) on the two drum sets.

Noted producer Jim Diamond played bass from 1997 until 2004 and during that time Diamond also recorded and co-produced the Dirtbombs output with Mick Collins at his Ghetto Recorders studio in Detroit. Troy Gregory (formerly of Flotsam and Jetsam, Prong, and lead singer of The Witches and Troy Gregory & The Stepsisters) has been playing bass for the band since June 2004, also constituting one of the longest runs of any Dirtbombs member: the four-year line-up of Collins, Pantano, Blackwell, Melina, and Gregory is the longest lasting Dirtbombs line-up to date. For a brief time in 2002, the band featured back-up singers Deanne Iovan (also formerly of the Come Ons) and future bass player Ko, in addition to five musicians.

=== Early singles and Horndog Fest (1996–2000) ===
Originally conceived as a "singles band", the Dirtbombs were to record only 7" records each in a radically different style. The band's first single, "High Octane Salvation", was released in 1996. The band released two singles in 1997, and also appeared on the Ghettoblaster Volume 1 compilation. They released another two singles in 1998.

Los Angeles-based independent label In The Red Records persuaded the Dirtbombs to record an LP. Collins decided that if the band were to record a full-length album they would treat it like a giant single, centering on one musical idea or genre. The full-length 1998 debut Horndog Fest is a mix of heavy garage punk and pop-inclined rock 'n roll. The songs "I Can't Stop Thinking About It", "Granny's Little Chicken", and "Shake Shivaree" remain live staples. "I Can't Stop Thinking About It" was used in a Buick commercial in 2007 and was later covered acoustically by the Romantics.

In 2000, the band released 2 singles, as well as a split single with The White Stripes. They also appeared on the X-Mas Surprise Package Volume 3 compilation, and backed Andre Williams on two songs on his "The Black Godfather" LP.

=== Ultraglide in Black and the Detroit rock and roll revival (2001–2003) ===
The Dirtbombs enjoyed a boost in recognition after the release of their second album, Ultraglide in Black, in 2001, a collection of nearly all soul, R&B, and Motown covers, with one original track - "Your Love Belongs Under A Rock". Around this time, a garage rock revival became vibrant in the American and European underground, led in part by fellow Detroit band the White Stripes, and the Dirtbombs were part of a multitude of Detroit bands that subsequently received attention from the music industry. Opening for the White Stripes (and with Jack White acknowledging the Gories as a major influence) brought the band increased publicity as well. In 2005, MSNBC.com listed Ultraglide on their list of the top albums of the past 20 years.

"Ode to a Black Man" was taken from the LP for a 2001 single. A five-song EP, Chariots of the Gods?, was also released that year, and the band appeared on the Jack White-produced Sympathetic Sounds of Detroit compilation that year as well.

Two new singles were issued in 2002. That same year, the Dirtbombs appeared on four compilations, as well as on Troy Gregory's solo album, Sybil. The band also toured extensively during this time, playing in Europe and Australia, in addition to the U.S. and Canada.

=== Dangerous Magical Noise (2003–2004) ===
In 2003 the band released their third LP, Dangerous Magical Noise. This album was originally going to be done in the style of bubblegum pop, but Collins ultimately chose to stick with a radio-friendly pop rock style, described by the band as being " the car-commercial record". The album featured a re-recorded version of their contribution to the Sympathetic Sounds compilation, "I'm Through with White Girls" written and sung by Jim Diamond. The single "Motor City Baby" was featured on Little Steven's Underground Garage as the "Coolest Song in the World".

The band, with Jim Diamond and Tom Potter on bass, was featured on a Dutch television documentary about the Detroit rock scene that also profiled the White Stripes and the Paybacks. Mick took the filmmakers on a tour of the Detroit music scene, and drummed for the White Stripes while they sang Loretta Lynn's "Rated X". The documentary concluded with the three of them bowling.

In 2004 the band headlined the Rock City Fest in Detroit (the show being Jim Diamond's final show with the band). 2004 was also a major year of record releasing: The band released a split LP with King Khan and the Shrines called Billiards at Nine Thirty, a second single from Dangerous Magical Noise, "Earthquake Heart", and a pair of new singles. Split singles were also issued, one backed with a Gories song, one with Justin Robertson, and one with ADULT.

=== If You Don't Already Have a Look and involvement with films (2005–2007) ===
In 2005 the band released If You Don't Already Have a Look a 2-disc collection of their singles and rarities, as well as six new songs. The band was showcased at the Motor City Music Conference and later in the year they toured Europe making stops in many places on the continent, including the Primavera Sound Festival in Spain and headlining tour dates in Zagreb and Belgrade.

A new split with the Love Supremes was issued, and the band also appeared on a Gun Club tribute record that year. In the summer of 2006, the song "Trainwreck" was used in a Walmart television commercial.

In October, the band played in Rivera Court at the Detroit Institute of Arts for the premiere of a documentary film called It Came From Detroit, in which the band was featured prominently in interviews and live footage. In May 2007 The Dirtbombs were invited by director Julian Schnabel to play at the Cannes Film Festival in honor of their song "Chains of Love", from the Ultraglide LP, being featured in his award-winning The Diving Bell and the Butterfly.

In September, the band played at the reopening of the Crofoot Ballroom in Pontiac, Michigan.

The band released one single in 2007, a cover of the Black Lips' "Oh Katrina".

=== We Have You Surrounded (2008–2009) ===
Recording of We Have You Surrounded, the fourth In The Red LP, began in November 2006 as a five-song EP. The length of time since the band's last full-length, 2003's Dangerous Magical Noise, led to the decision to finish it as an LP, once again postponing the bubblegum record. Recording resumed in the summer of 2007, and We Have You Surrounded was released in February 2008. Far from being bubblegum, the album's themes are dark. The song "Leopard Man at C & A" features lyrics taken from comic book writer Alan Moore's poem of the same name, (described by Collins as "a fabulous take on urban paranoia").

In support of We Have You Surrounded, the band embarked on tours of the U.S., Canada, Europe, Australia, and New Zealand. Festival appearances included the Golden Plains Festival in Australia, The Voodoo Music Experience in New Orleans, the Afro Punk Festival in Brooklyn, and the All Tomorrow's Parties's Nightmare Before Christmas Festival in England. In July 2008, the band returned to the eastern U.S., opening for Spiritualized, and later touring with TV on the Radio in the Fall.

Five singles were issued in 2008: a cover of a Suicide song on the Irish label Infirmary Phonographic; an INXS covers single on Australian label Stained Circles; a Sparks covers single on In The Red, which includes "Sherlock Holmes", also found on We Have You Surrounded and an iTunes compilation; and two splits on Cass Records with 2008 touring partners - a cover of Detroit proto-punk band Death on a split with touring partner Kelley Stoltz and a split with Dan Sartain.

While touring for We Have You Surrounded, Ko Melina stopped playing her parts on a "fuzzed" bass and instead started playing a baritone guitar.

=== Daddy Rockin' Strong LP and Party Store (2010–2011) ===
In 2010, The Dirtbombs recorded the title track for Daddy Rockin Strong: A Tribute to Nolan Strong & The Diablos.

In February 2011, the band released their fifth LP, Party Store. A sequel of sorts to Ultraglide In Black, Party Store features rock covers of early Detroit techno and house music. A companion remix album was released by Scion's Scion A/V label.

=== Ooey Gooey Chewy Ka-blooey! (2013) ===
In September 2013, Ooey Gooey Chewy Ka-blooey!, the long-promised bubblegum record, was finally released.

The Dirtbombs have played live sporadically following the tour for Party Store, notably playing the Mosswood Meltdown in Oakland in 2022 and 2026 (followed up by an appearance at the Stork Club in Oakland later in the same day in 2026). The line-up for both of those performances were Mick Collins, Ko Melina, Tory Gregory, Ben Blackwell and Chris Sutton.

== Live experience ==
The Dirtbombs have a long and widely praised history as a live act. Spin magazine listed the Dirtbombs at number 10 in their list of "Top 25 Live Bands Now" in the September 2006 issue. The band has opened for a diversity of famous acts: In 2002, the band opened for Blondie on their Michigan and Illinois tour dates, and in subsequent years, they've opened for Mudhoney, Radio Birdman, TV on the Radio and Spiritualized. Over the years, the band has headlined tours with such up and coming bands as The Killers, the Black Lips, Be Your Own Pet, and Jay Reatard, many of which would go on to become major label acts. In 2002, rising art-punk band Yeah Yeah Yeahs opened for the Dirtbombs at the relatively small Bowery Ballroom in New York. Four years later, the Dirtbombs would open for the Yeah Yeah Yeahs at the massively larger Roseland Ballroom, also in New York City. The band jokingly refers to this trend as "The Dirtbombs Curse".

== Former members ==
- Pat Pantano: drums
- Andre Williams: vocals
- Dana Spicer (Eric S. Johnson, aka Wedgehead): bass/fuzz
- Tom Lynch: bass
- Chris Fachini: drums
- Scott: drums
- Ewolf: drums
- Chandy (Chris Handyside): drums
- Joe Greenwald: bass/fuzz
- Jim Diamond: bass, vocals
- Deanne Iovan: bass/fuzz, backing vocals
- Dion Fischer: baritone fuzz
- Nick Lloyd: drums
- Ryan Pritts: drums
- Tom Potter: fuzz bass, backing vocals
- Patrick Keeler: drums (a couple of shows in June 2004)

== Discography ==
=== Albums ===
Year	Title	Label	Notes
1998	Horndog Fest	In the Red	
2001	Ultraglide in Black	In the Red	
2003	Dangerous Magical Noise	In the Red	
2008	We Have You Surrounded	In the Red	
2011	Party Store	In the Red	
2013	Ooey Gooey Chewy Ka-blooey!	In the Red	

=== EPs ===
- Chariot of the Gods? EP (Au Go Go Records, 2001)

=== Compilation albums ===
Year	Title	Label	Notes
2005	If You Don't Already Have a Look	In the Red	
2013	Consistency Is the Enemy	Cass Records	

=== Singles ===
- High Octane Salvation 7" (Sympathy for the Record Industry, 1996)
- All Geeked Up 7" (In The Red, 1997)
- Tina Louise 7" (Flying Bomb Records, 1998)
- Maybe Your Baby 7" (High Maintenance, 1998)
- Stuck Under My Shoe 7" (Some Assembly Required, 1998)
- Headlights On 7" (Solid Sex Lovie Doll Records, 2000)
- Brucia I Cavi 7" (Hate Records, 2000)
- Ode to a Black Man 7" (Sweet Nothing, 2001)
- Australian Sing a Long with the Dirtbomb Singers 7" (Zerox Records, 2002)
- Pray for Pills 7" (Corduroy Records, 2002)
- Motor City Baby 7" (Sweet Nothing, 2003)
- Earthquake Heart 7" (Velvet Tiger, 2004)
- Merit 7" (Kapow Records, 2004)
- Crashdown Day 7" (Corduroy Records, 2004)
- Tanzen Gehn' 7" (Soundflat Records, 2005)
- Brand New Game 7" (Munster Records, 2005)
- Oh Katrina 7" (Noiseless/Live From Detroit, 2007)
- Rocket USA 7" (Infirmary Phonographic, 2008)
- Need You Tonight 7" (Stained Circles, 2008)
- The Dirtbombs... Play Sparks 7" (In the Red, 2008)
- Race to the Bottom 12" (Cass Records, 2009)
- Kick Me 7" (Cass Records, 2010)

=== Split records with others ===
- "Cedar Point '76", with the White Stripes (Extra Ball Records, 2000)
- "King's Led Hat", with The Gories (Fortune Teller Records, 2004)
- "She Played Me Like a Booger", with Justin Robertson (Slut Smalls, 2004)
- "Lost Love", with ADULT. (Cass Records/Ersatz Audio, 2004)
- "Billiards at Nine-Thirty", with King Khan And His Shrines (Sounds of Subterrania, 2004)
- "No Expectations", with The Love Supremes (Norton Records, 2005)
- "Missionary Man", with The Black Lips (Cass Records, 2006)
- "Kung Fu", with the Voltaire Brothers and Pitch Black City (Mahogani Music, 2007)
- "Politicians in My Eyes", with Kelley Stoltz (Cass Records, 2008)
- "Politicians in My Eyes", with The Terrible Twos(Detroit) and Dan Sartain (Cass Records, 2008)
- "Secret Code", with Davila 666 (Scion Audio Visual, 2010)

=== Appeared on compilations ===
- Ghettoblaster: A Detroit Music Sampler 1997 Volume 1 CD (Motor City Brewing Works, 1997)
- I Hate Music CD (P-Vine, 1999)
- Hot Pinball Rock Vol. 1 CD (Extra Ball Records, 2000)
- X-Mas Surprise Package Volume 3 7" (Flying Bomb Records, 2000)
- Sympathetic Sounds of Detroit LP/CD (Sympathy For The Record Industry, 2001)
- Hometaping - Volume 1 CD (Kerrang!, 2002)
- Troy Gregory's Sybil CD (Fall Of Rome Records)
- Rough Trade Shops Rock And Roll 2xCD (Mute, 2002)
- X-Mas Surprise Package (The Collector's Edition) CD (Flying Bomb Records, 2002)
- Ghettoblaster Volume 2 CD (Motor City Brewing Works, 2002)
- Playing Favourites LP (Illustrious Artists, 2003)
- Revolver USA Sampler Autumn 2003 CD (Revolver USA, 2003)
- Detroit Breakdown - The Rocked Out Motor City Music Sampler CD (PBS 106.7FM, 2004)
- Superfuzz CD (Lowfly Records, 2005)
- Salvo of 24 Gunshots - Tribute to Gun Club LP/CD (Unrecording Records, 2005)
- Static Disaster The UK. In the Red Records Sampler CD (In The Red, 2005)
- Daddy Rockin Strong: A Tribute to Nolan Strong & The Diablos LP (The Wind, Norton, 2010)
