= Mink, Rat or Rabbit =

Mink, Rat, or Rabbit (1998)

Studio album by the Detroit Cobras
- Released: February 24, 1998
- Genre: Garage rock
- Length: 31:48
- Label: Sympathy for the Record Industry
- Producer: Al Sutton & the Detroit Cobras

The Detroit Cobras chronology
Mink, Rat, or Rabbit (1998) (1998)	Life, Love and Leaving (2001)

Professional ratings
Review scores
Source	Rating
AllMusic	4.5/5 stars

Mink, Rat or Rabbit is the debut album by the Detroit Cobras, released 24 February 1998.

The title quotes a line from Irma Thomas's "Hittin on Nothing" complaining that the singer has not received a promised mink coat.

== Track listing ==
1. Cha Cha Twist
  - Original by Brice Coefield
2. I'll Keep Holding On
  - Original by the Marvelettes
3. Putty (In Your Hands)
  - Original by the Shirelles
4. Easier To Cry
  - Original by the Shangri-Las
5. Bad Girl
  - Original by the Oblivians
6. Summer (The Slum)
  - Original by the 5 Royales
7. Midnight Blues
  - Original by Charlie Rich
8. You Knows What To Do
  - Original by Barrett Strong
9. Can't Do Without You
  - Original by Dusty Wilson
10. Hittin' On Nothing
  - Original by Irma Thomas
11. Out Of This World
  - Original by Gino Washington
12. Chumbawa
  - Original by Gabriel And the Angels
13. Breakaway
  - Original by Irma Thomas

== Personnel ==
- Rachel Nagy - Vocals
- Maribel (Mary) Ramirez - Guitar/Vocals
- Steve Shaw - Guitar/Vocals
- Jeff Meier - Bass
- Damian Lang - Drums/Vocals
