= Mickey Lee Lane =

American musician (1941–2011)

Sholom Mayer Schreiber
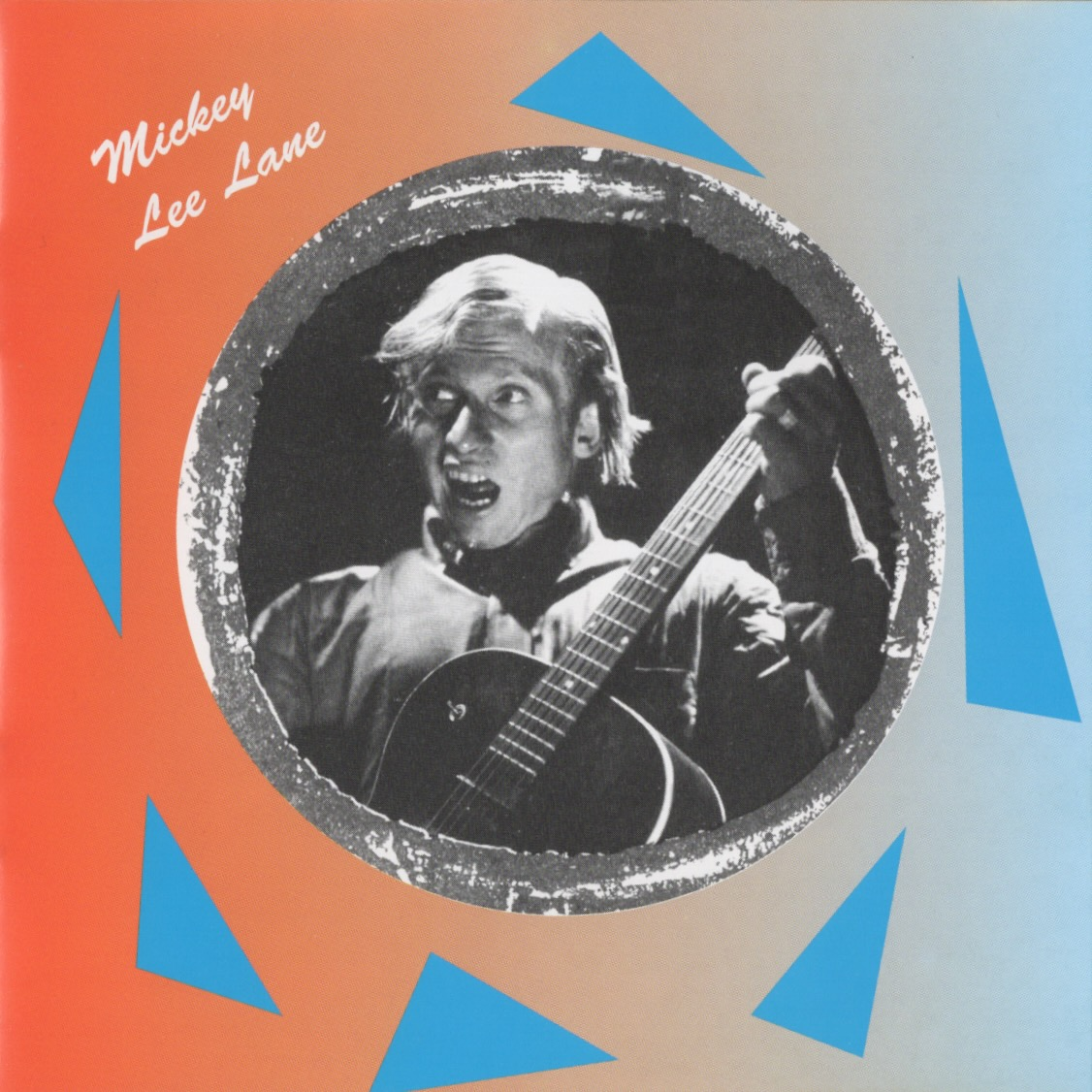
- Mickey Lee Lane (via Buffalo Bop CD 55014)

Background information
- Born: Sholom Mayer Schreiber; February 2, 1941; Rochester, New York
- Died: March 18, 2011 (aged 70) New York City, New York
- Genres: Garage rock; Rock and roll
- Occupations: Singer-songwriter; Musician; Recording engineer
- Instruments: Guitar; Piano
- Years active: 1957-2011

Mickey Lee Lane (born Sholom Mayer Schreiber; February 2, 1941 – March 18, 2011) was an American rock and roll songwriter and arranger.

Lane was born in Rochester, New York. He got a job in the Brill Building as a songwriter in the 1950s, working with Neil Sedaka as a touring pianist, and Bill Haley as a songwriter. In addition, he released some singles on Brunswick Records and Swan Records in the 1950s and 1960s; one of them, "Shaggy Dog", became a hit and peaked at #38 on the Billboard Hot 100. His tune "Hey Sah-Lo-Ney" was covered by British group The Action, The Detroit Cobras (retitled "Hey Sailor"), and Ronnie Spector on her solo album The Last of the Rock Stars.

Lane continued working as a recording engineer from the late 1960s into the 1990s. Toward the end of the century, Rollercoaster Records in the UK released a compilation CD entitled Rockin' On...And Beyond, which featured both his previous singles and unreleased material.

== Discography ==
=== Compilation albums ===
- Rockin' On... And Beyond (1997)

=== EPs ===
- Rock The Bop! With Mickey Lee Lane (1995)

=== Singles ===
Year	Single	Chart Positions	
Year	Single	US	AU
1960	"Dum Dee DeeDum" b/w "Nightcap"	-	-
1964	"Shaggy Dog" b/w "Oo-Oo"	38	36
1965	"Hey Sah-Lo-Ney" b/w "Of Yesterday"	-	-
1965	"The Zoo" b/w "(They're All In) The Senior Class"	-	-
1966	"She Don't Want To" b/w "The Only Thing To Do"	-	-
1968	"Tutti Frutti" b/w "With Your Love (I'll Make It Through)"	-	-
