= Seven Easy Pieces (EP) =

EP by The Detroit Cobras
- Released: March 10, 2003
- Venue: Rustbelt Studios, Royal Oak, Michigan
- Genre: Garage soul
- Label: Rough Trade Records
- Producer: Rough Trade Records Ltd.

The Detroit Cobras chronology
Life, Love and Leaving (2001)	Seven Easy Pieces (2003)	Baby (2005)

Seven Easy Pieces is the first EP and third overall release by American garage rock band the Detroit Cobras, released in March 2003 on Rough Trade Records of London, and distributed in Spain by Sinnamon Records of Barcelona. This particular mini-album was appended to a pressing of Baby by Bloodshot Records.

== Track listing ==
1. "Ya Ya Ya (Looking for My Baby)"
  - original written by Doc Starkes, Melvin Smith of the Nite Riders
2. "My Baby Loves the Secret Agent"
  - original written by Fred Sledge Smith of The Olympics
3. "Heartbeat"
  - original written by Edward C. Cobb for singer Gloria Jones
4. "You Don't Knock"
  - original written by Roebuck "Pops" Staples of The Staple Singers
5. "Silver & Gold (When I Get Like This)"
  - original written Carl Lebow and Otto Jeffries by for The "5" Royales
6. "99 and a Half Just Won't Do"
  - original written by Ronald G. King for Dorothy Love Coates
7. "Insane Asylum"
  - original written by Willie Dixon for Koko Taylor

== Personnel ==
- Rachel Nagy - Vocals
- Mary Ramirez - Guitar / Vocals
- Greg Cartwright - Guitar / Vocals on Insane Asylum
- Eddie Harsch - Bass / Keys / Vocals
- Kenny Tudrick - Drums / Vocals on Insane Asylum
- Joey Mazzola - Guitar solo on Ya Ya Ya (Looking for My Baby)
- Steve Nawara - additional Guitar on Silver & Gold (When I Get Like This)

== Notes ==
- Al Sutton - Audio Engineer
- Jeff Teader - UK graphic designer and Art Director at Oskar Design
- Glen Barr - front cover Painting
- Nancy Paterra - Liner note Photography
- Brian T Kirchner - back cover Photography
