= Tomorrow is Alright =

Studio album by Sonny & The Sunsets
- Released: 17 November 2009 (Soft Abuse)
- Genre: Indie
- Label: Soft Abuse

Professional ratings
Review scores
Source	Rating
SPIN	6/10 stars
Pitchfork	8.0/10
The A.V. Club	B
Reviler.org	91/100

Tomorrow is Alright is a 2009 album by American band Sonny & The Sunsets.

== Track listing ==
1. "Too Young to Burn"
2. "Death Cream"
3. "Strange Love"
4. "Planet of Women"
5. "The Houris"
6. "Stranded"
7. "Bad Vibes & Evil Thoughts"
8. "Chapters"
9. "Love Among Social Animals"
10. "Lovin' on an Older Gal"

== Personnel ==
- Sonny Smith
- Kelley Stoltz
- Tahlia harbour
- Shayde Sartin
- Raphi Gottesman
- Heidi Alexander
- Tim Cohen
- John Dwyer
- Andrew Gerhan - engineering, mixing
- Chris Johanson - cover art
