= Ko Melina =

American singer-songwriter

- Origin: Detroit, Michigan
- Genres: Garage punk
- Occupation(s): singer, DJ
- Instrument(s): vocals, bass, baritone guitar
- Labels: various

Ko Melina, also known as Ko Shih and Ko Melina-Zydeco, is a musician and radio DJ from Detroit, Michigan.

== Biography ==
A bartender at the Garden Bowl, a rock n' roll hotspot in Detroit, Melina befriended scene fixtures like Jack White and Steve Shaw from the Detroit Cobras. Shaw asked her to play bass for his new band the Breakdowns. With only childhood piano lessons under her belt, Melina taught herself bass. After hearing her cover Mary Wells's "Bye Bye Baby" with the Breakdowns, Long Gone John of the record label Sympathy for the Record Industry asked her to contribute to his Sympathetic Sounds of Detroit compilation and so Ko & The Knockouts were formed with Steve Nawara and Jeff Klein. Eddie Baranek from the Sights later replaced Klein, and the band released a self-titled album on Sympathy for the Record Industry and toured Europe and the United States.

Ko later joined The Dirtbombs, replacing Tom Potter as "fuzz" bass player, though she later switched to a baritone guitar. Steven Van Zandt asked her to be a DJ for his Underground Garage show on SIRIUS Satellite Radio after he heard the Ko & The Knockouts album

Ko was featured alongside fellow Dirtbomb Zach Weedon in the documentary on Detroit called 'Detroit Lives' by Palladium Boots for their website. In the documentary, Melina and Weedon accompany host Johnny Knoxville on a tour of the abandoned Eastown Theatre, and offer other interview segments about Detroit.
