= Cha Cha Twist =

Single by The Detroit Cobras

from the album Mink, Rat or Rabbit
- Released: March 13, 2004
- Length: 4:20
- Label: Rough Trade Records

"Cha Cha Twist" is a 1960 song by Brice Coefield. A song called "Cha Cha Twist" was also recorded by Connie Francis in 1962 on MGM, and by Paul Gallis on Heartbreak Records.

== Detroit Cobras version ==
The track was the debut CD and 7" single of American band The Detroit Cobras in 2004.

== Track listing ==
=== CD version ===
1. "Cha Cha Twist" - 2:30
2. "The Real Thing" - 1:48
3. "Cha Cha Twist" (Video)

=== Vinyl version ===
1. "Cha Cha Twist"
2. "Hey Sailor"
