= The Detroit Cobras =

American garage rock band

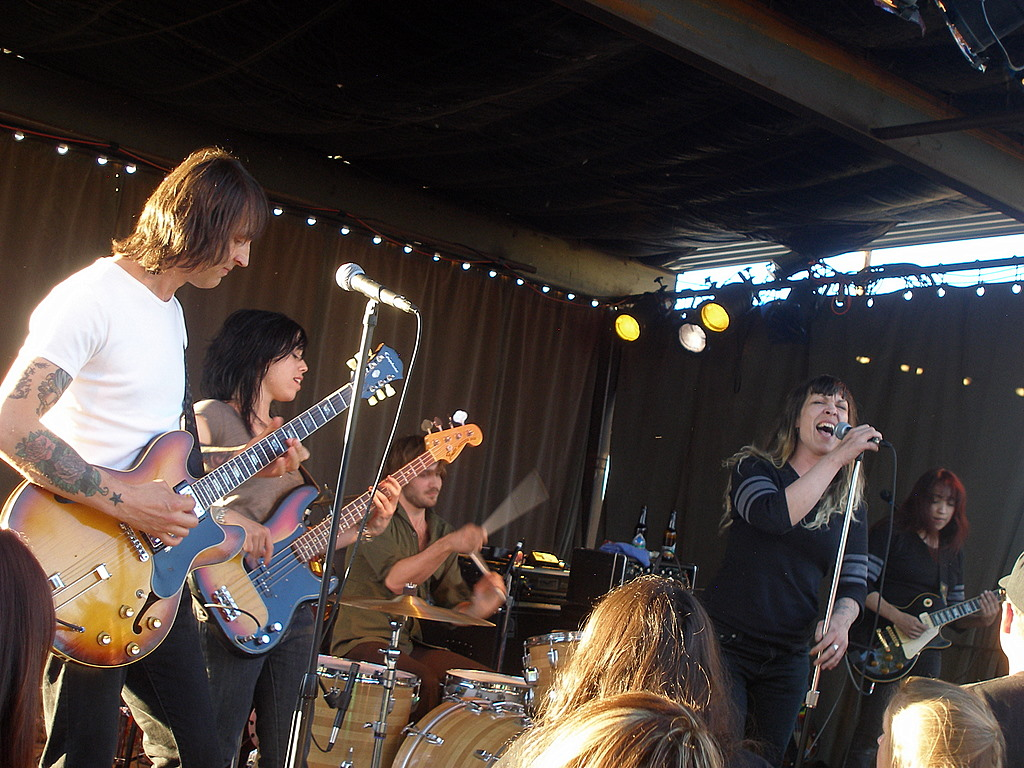
- The Detroit Cobras performing at the Santa Fe Brewing Co. in 2008

Background information
- Origin: Detroit, Michigan, U.S.
- Genres: Garage rock, garage punk
- Years active: 1994–present
- Labels: Human Fly, Black Mamba, Scooch Pooch, Sympathy for the Record Industry, Rough Trade, Bloodshot, Third Man
- Members: Marcus Durant; Mary Ramirez; Steve Nawara; Dale Wilson; Kevin Irwin
- Past members: See "Former members" section

The Detroit Cobras are an American garage rock band from Detroit, Michigan, which was formed in 1994 by guitarist Steve Shaw, guitarist Mary Ramirez, bassist Jeff Meier, drummer Vic Hill, and singer Rachel Nagy. The group was later known (with the exception of Rachel Nagy and Mary Ramirez) for a constantly changing assortment of musicians. Rachel Nagy died on January 14, 2022.

== History ==
The Detroit Cobras signed with Sympathy for the Record Industry and released their first album, Mink, Rat or Rabbit, in 1998. After a three-year gap, they released a second album, Life, Love and Leaving.

Their retro-garage rock formula proved popular in the UK and prompted the London-based Rough Trade Records to sign the band. They released an EP, Seven Easy Pieces, in 2003 and their third album, Baby, in 2004. Baby broke with the Cobras' tradition in that it included one original song, "Hot Dog (Watch Me Eat)". Baby was picked up for release in the US by Bloodshot (who added the songs from the Seven Easy Pieces EP to the end of Baby. In April 2007, Bloodshot released the band's fourth album, Tied & True.

Nagy died on January 14, 2022, in New Orleans. News reports gave widely varying ages immediately following her death, ranging from her late 30s to her late 50s, but she was in fact 48 years old (born December 15, 1973).

== Members ==
=== Current line-up ===
- vacant – lead vocals
- Mary Ramirez – guitar (also known as Mary Cobra and Maribel Restrepo)
- Steve Nawara – guitar
- Dale Wilson – bass
- Kevin Irwin – drums

=== Former members ===
Vocalists

- Rachel Nagy

Guitarists

- Steve Shaw
- Soup
- Dante Adrian White
- Dan Maister
- Greg Cartwright
- Mike "Hadji" Hodgkiss
- Eddie Baranek
- Reuben Glazer
- Brad Meinerding
- Joey Mazzola (also bass)

Bassists

- Jeff Meier
- Rob Smith
- John Szymanski
- Matt O'Brien
- Jim Diamond
- Eddie Harsch
- Ko Melina
- Carol Schumacher
- Gina Rodriguez
- Jake Culkowski

Drummers

- Nick Lucassian (also bass)
- Vic Hill
- Chris Fachini (also guitar)
- Damian Lang
- Dave Shettler
- Skeeto Valdez
- Tony DeCurtis
- Dave Vaughn
- Johnny "Bee" Badanjek
- Richie Wohlfeil
- Kenny Tudrick

== Discography ==
=== Albums and EPs ===
- Mink, Rat or Rabbit - LP, CD, MP3 (1998, Sympathy for the Record Industry; reissued 2004 and 2016)
- Life, Love and Leaving - LP, CD (2001, Sympathy for the Record Industry, Rough Trade; reissued 2004, Sinnamon Records, Rough Trade)
- Life, Love and Leaving - remastered CD, MP3 (2016, Third Man)
- Seven Easy Pieces (EP) - CD (2003, Rough Trade)
- Baby - LP, CD, MP3 (2004, Rough Trade, Sinnamon Records; reissued 2005, Rough Trade)
- Baby - Enhanced CD (2005, Bloodshot, BS 125 - includes Seven Easy Pieces and video of Cha Cha Twist)
- Tied & True - LP, CD (2007, Rough Trade, Bloodshot, Fiveman Army; reissued 2011 Bloodshot)

=== Compilations ===
- Bankstock II - CD (1995, 44 Caliber Records, RFD 2301) recorded at the Old Miami, in Detroit, July 4 weekend, 1995
- The Original Recordings (Singles and Unreleased 1995-1997) - LP, CD, vinyl 7" Box Set (2008, Munster Records)

=== Singles ===
- "Village of Love" / "Marie Christina" - vinyl 7" (1996, Human Fly)
- "Over to my House" / "Down In Louisiana"- vinyl 7" (1996, Black Mamba)
- "Ain't It a Shame" / "Slum Lord" - vinyl 7" (1996, Scooch Pooch)
- "Cha Cha Twist" / "Hey Sailor" - vinyl 7" (2004, Rough Trade, RTRADS189)
- "Cha Cha Twist" / "The Real Thing" / video of "Cha Cha Twist" - Enhanced CD,(2004, Rough Trade, RTRADSCD189)
- "Cha Cha Twist" - promo CD, (2004, Rough Trade, RTRADSCDP189 - cover Transcript: "Detroit Cobras, Live at Ulu, Wed 8th Sept")
- "Ya Ya Ya (Looking for My Baby)" / "As Long As I Have You" - vinyl 7" (2008, Stag-O-Lee)
- "Feel Good" - digital single (2015, iTunes)
- "What More" / "I Can't Go Back" - vinyl 7" - digital single (2018, Third Man Records, TMR579)
