= Horndog Fest =

Studio album by the Dirtbombs
- Released: 1998
- Recorded: March 1997 – April 1997
- Genre: Rock
- Label: In the Red

The Dirtbombs chronology
Horndog Fest (1998)	Ultraglide in Black (2001)

Horndog Fest is an album by the American band the Dirtbombs, released in 1998.

== Critical reception ==
Professional ratings
Review scores
Source	Rating
AllMusic	3/5 stars
Tom Hull – on the Web	B+

The Toronto Star wrote: "Picture a funky Adam and the Ants locked in a steel mill with the John Spencer Blues Explosion, a Temptations songbook and far, far too much wattage, and you'll have an indication of the arresting musical miasma emanating from the Dirtbombs' debut disc, Horndog Fest."

== Track listing ==
All songs written by Mick Collins, except where noted.
U.S. LP/CD release

No.	Title	Writer(s)	Length
1.	"Vixens in Space"		2:18
2.	"I Can't Stop Thinking About It"		3:03
3.	"Granny's Little Chicken"		3:54
4.	"Bittersweet Romance Song"		2:21
5.	"Armageddon Double Feature (Lovesick Blues #4)"	Collins, Joe Greenwald, Tom Lynch	3:30
6.	"She Blinded Me with Playtex"		1:30
7.	"A Brief Treatise on the Discovery of Antimatter"		0:30
8.	"Pheremone [sic] Smile"		2:59
9.	"My Heart Burns with Deeps of Lurve"	Tom Lynch, Andreas Martin	4:05
10.	"Burnt to Cinders"		1:40
11.	"Fox Box"		2:15
12.	"Shake!! Shivaree"		1:26

Japan CD release (In the Red/Blues Interactions, Inc.)

No.	Title	Writer(s)	Length
1.	"Vixens in Space"		2:18
2.	"I Can't Stop Thinking About It"		3:03
3.	"Granny's Little Chicken"		3:54
4.	"Don't Bogue My High"		2:16
5.	"Bittersweet Romance Song"		2:21
6.	"Armageddon Double Feature (Lovesick Blues #4)"	Collins, Joe Greenwald, Tom Lynch	3:30
7.	"She Blinded Me with Playtex"		1:30
8.	"Infra-Red"		2:18
9.	"A Brief Treatise on the Discovery of Antimatter"		0:30
10.	"Pheremone [sic] Smile"		2:59
11.	"My Heart Burns with Deeps of Lurve"	Tom Lynch, Andreas Martin	4:05
12.	"Nichele Nichols [sic]"		0:58
13.	"Burnt to Cinders"		1:40
14.	"Fox Box"		2:15
15.	"Shake!! Shivaree"		1:26
16.	"Trouble"	William Robinson	2:12

4, 8, 12 and 16 are bonus tracks, taken from the 1996 7" All Geeked Up. 8 was originally titled "Infrared," 12 was "I'm Saving Myself for Nichelle Nichols (No. 3)" and 16 was "I'll Be in Trouble," and is a cover of the Temptations' 1964 hit song.
