= Fruitvale (album) =

Album by Sonny Smith

Studio album by Sonny Smith (musician)
- Released: 17 April 2007 (Belle Sound)
- Genre: Indie
- Label: Belle Sound

Fruitvale is a 2007 album by American musician Sonny Smith. The songs on the album make reference to the Oakland neighborhood of the same name.

== Track listing ==
1. "Day in the Life of a Heel"
2. "Good Folks Bad Folks"
3. "Mario"
4. "Bad Cop"
5. "Curtis on the Corner"
6. "Mr. Low"
7. "Private Dick"
8. "Someday Land"
9. "Another Waitress in Love"
10. "I'm So Happy"

== Personnel ==
- Sonny Smith
- Leroy Bach (wilco)
- Dave Hilliard
- Mathew Luz
- Nora O'Connor
- Edith Frost
- Kelly Hogan
