= Life, Love and Leaving =

Studio album by the Detroit Cobras
- Released: May 1, 2001
- Genre: Garage soul
- Label: Rough Trade

The Detroit Cobras chronology
Mink Rat or Rabbit (1998)	Life, Love and Leaving (2001)	Seven Easy Pieces (2003)

Professional ratings
Review scores
Source	Rating
AllMusic	4.5/5 stars

Life, Love and Leaving is the second studio album by the Detroit Cobras, released May 1, 2001.

== Track listing ==
1. Hey Sailor
  - Original by Mickey Lee Lane as "Hey Sah-Lo-Ney" (1965)
  - Written by Mickey Lee Lane
2. He Did It
  - Original by the Ronettes (1965)
  - Written by Jackie DeShannon / Sharon Sheeley
3. Find Me a Home
  - Original by Solomon Burke as "Home in Your Heart" (1963)
  - Written by Otis Blackwell / Winfield Scott
4. Oh My Lover
  - Original by the Chiffons (1962)
  - Written by Ronnie Mack
5. Cry On
  - Original by Irma Thomas (1961)
  - Written by Allen Toussaint
6. Stupidity
  - Original by the Van Dykes (1962)
  - Written by Solomon Burke
7. Bye Bye Baby
  - Original by Mary Wells (1960)
  - Written by Mary Wells
8. Boss Lady
  - Original by Davis & Jones and the Fenders as "Boss with the Hot Sauce" (1964)
  - Written by George Davis / Willard Jones
9. Laughing at You
  - Original by the Gardenias (1957)
  - Written by John Gibson / Lee Hohisel
10. Can't Miss Nothing
  - Original by Ike and Tina Turner as "You Can't Miss Nothing That You Never Had" (1964)
  - Written by Ike Turner
11. Right Around the Corner
  - Original by the "5" Royales (1955)
  - Written by Rose Marie McCoy / Charles Singleton
12. Won't You Dance with Me
  - Original by Billy Lee and the Rivieras (1964)
  - Written by Jim McCarty / Mitch Ryder
13. Let's Forget About the Past
  - Original by Clyde McPhatter (1962)
  - Written by Clyde McPhatter
14. Shout Bama Lama
  - Original by Otis Redding and the Pinetoppers (1962)
  - Written by Otis Redding

== Personnel ==
- Rachel Nagy – vocals
- Maribel (Mary) Ramirez – guitar
- Dante Aliano (Dante Adrian White) – guitar
- Eddie Harsch – bass/organ/piano
- Damian Lang – drums

Also

- James Wailin – harmonica
- Jeff Grand – slide guitar

== Trivia ==
The Detroit Cobras rendition of "Hey Sailor" was used in the soundtrack to the episode "Harm's Way" (2004) of the TV series Angel.
