= Bantam Rooster =

American garage punk band

- Origin: Lansing, Michigan, United States
- Genres: Garage punk
- Years active: 1994–2003
- Labels: Crypt, Sympathy for the Record Industry
- Past members: Thomas Jackson Potter; Eric Cook; Mike Alonso

Bantam Rooster was an American garage punk band, formed in 1994 in Lansing, Michigan and disbanded in 2003.

== History ==
Bantam Rooster formed in 1994 as the duo of vocalist and guitarist Thomas Jackson Potter (formerly of Kill Devil Hill) and drummer Eric Cook, who teamed up between working with other bands. According to Potter, they considered adding additional members but by that time had already written songs that worked as a guitar-drum duo, so decided not to. According to Potter, the duo were initially attempting to reproduce the sound of Guitar Wolf's Wolf Rock! album. After playing live around the American Mid-West they signed to Crypt Records for their first release, the "Miss Luxury" single in 1996.

Their debut album, Deal Me In was recorded in late 1996 with Jim Diamond and released in 1997, followed by a European tour. Second album The Cross and the Switchblade, with Mike Alonso on drums, was released in 1999, described by Allmusic as "both heavier and more frantic" than Deal Me In, and by Exclaim! as "a must for any fans of rockabilly/blues-influenced punk rock".

Third album Fuck All Y'all appeared in 2000 after a switch to Sympathy for the Record Industry.

Bantam Rooster disbanded in 2003 as Potter formed the funk rock band Detroit City Council.

== Discography ==
=== Albums ===
- Deal Me In (1997), Crypt
- The Cross and the Switchblade (1999), Crypt
- Fuck All Y'all (2000), Sympathy for the Record Industry

=== Singles, EPs ===
- "Miss Luxury" (1996), Crypt
- "Watch Me Burn" (1997), Flying Bomb
- "Low Budget Lust" (1999), Hate
- "I, Gemini"/"Welcome To The Carrousel" (2000), Estrus
- Big Mess (2000), Flying Bomb (EP)
- "Mexican Leather" (2000), Big Neck
- "Tarantula" (2015), Jett Plastic
