= The Gories =

American garage rock band

- Origin: Detroit, Michigan, United States
- Genres: Garage punk; garage rock; punk blues
- Years active: 1986–1992; 2009; 2010
- Labels: In the Red, Sub Pop, Crypt
- Past members: Mick Collins (guitar, vocals); Dan Kroha (guitar, vocals); Peggy O'Neill (drums)

The Gories are an American garage punk trio that formed in Detroit, Michigan, United States, in 1986. They were among the first 1980s garage rock bands to incorporate overt blues influences. The band features Mick Collins (later of The Dirtbombs), Dan Kroha (later of the now defunct The Demolition Doll Rods) on guitar and vocals, and Peggy O'Neill on drums.

The band originally broke up in 1992 after a European tour, reforming in July 2009 for a reunion tour across Europe, along with co-headliners The Oblivians. The band reconvened for a second reunion tour in 2010, this time across North America.

== History ==
The Gories were formed in 1986 by metro-Detroit natives Mick Collins, Dan Kroha, and Peggy O'Neill. The Gories took their name from a band that appeared on the 1960s television show Gidget. The band members, who at that time dressed in mod clothing, were friends for over a year before they decided to start the band. At the time they formed the Gories, only Collins had had any musical experience, and they had to teach themselves how to play. The Gories released their first album, Houserockin', in 1989. The release had been pre-dated by two songs on a Wanghead compilation LP, It Came From The Garage Vol. II. The band recorded the follow-up LP, I Know You Fine, but How You Doin', in 1990, produced by Alex Chilton. They soon signed to the German label Crypt Records and released Outta Here. After three albums, the band suffered a break-up in 1992.

== Hiatus ==
Mick Collins went on to form various bands including Blacktop and The Dirtbombs, while Dan Kroha joined Rocket 455 and later formed the Demolition Doll Rods and The Readies. Peggy O'Neill went on to join '68 Comeback and The Darkest Hours.

== Reunion ==
In September 2008, via the Goner Records message board, Greg Cartwright of the Oblivians announced that the Gories and the Oblivians would play reunion shows in Detroit and Memphis, as well as multiple shows across Europe in the summer of 2009.

The Detroit Free Press reported the reunion on April 1, 2009. The Metro Times ran a cover story on The Gories in its June 24, 2009, issue. The Oblivians-Gories show was at the Majestic Theater in Detroit on June 26, 2009.

In 2013, Third Man Records would release The Shaw Tapes, a live recording of the band in 1988. In 2015, Third Man Records would also release the first new recording by the band in 20 years, a single featuring a cover of The Nomads' "Be Nice", as well as an original song "On the Run".

== Discography ==
=== Singles ===
- "Nitroglycerine" (New Rose, 1990, new 141/NR 100)
- "Here Be The Gories" (In The Red Records, 1991, ITR 003)
- "Give Me Some Money" (Sub Pop, 1992, SP 134)
- "Baby Say Unh!" (Estrus Records, 1992, ES 724)
- "To Find Out" (Giant Claw, 1992, GCS-005)
- "You Little Nothing" (Get Hip Records, 1995, GH-173)
- “Be Nice” b/w “On the Run” (Third Man Records), 2015, TMR-308)

=== Albums ===
- Houserockin' LP/CD (Fanclub Records/New Rose, 1989, NR 340/FC 077)
- I Know You Fine, But How You Doin' LP/CD (New Rose, 1990, ROSE 219)
- Outta Here LP/CD (Crypt Records, 1992, CR-030)

=== Compilations ===
- I Know You Be Houserockin' CD (Crypt Records, 1994, CR-CD-04241) (re-release of first two records)

=== Live albums ===
- The Shaw Tapes: Live in Detroit 5-27-88, 2013 (Third Man Records), CD and 12" Vinyl
