= Ultraglide in Black =

Studio album by The Dirtbombs
- Released: May 21, 2001
- Genre: Garage punk
- Length: 44:27
- Label: In the Red

The Dirtbombs chronology
Horndog Fest (1998)	Ultraglide in Black (2001)	Dangerous Magical Noise (2003)

Professional ratings
Review scores
Source	Rating
AllMusic	4.5/5 stars
The Encyclopedia of Popular Music	3/5 stars
The Great Rock Discography	8/10
Metro Times	4/5 stars
NME	4/5 stars
Spin	8/10
Tom Hull – on the Web	B+

Ultraglide in Black is an album by the American rock music group The Dirtbombs.

The album is mostly covers of soul and funk songs. Band leader Mick Collins stated that this album was his tribute to the black music he grew up with. The only song that is not a cover is "Your Love Belongs Under a Rock."

The album cover pays homage to Stevie Wonder's 1967 album cover for I Was Made to Love Her.

== Track listing ==
No.	Title	Writer(s)	Original artist	Length
1.	"Chains of Love"	J.J. Barnes, M. Davis, D. Davis	J.J. Barnes	2:21
2.	"If You Can Want"	Smokey Robinson	The Miracles	2:57
3.	"Underdog"	Sly Stone	Sly & the Family Stone	3:35
4.	"Your Love Belongs Under a Rock"	Mick Collins	The Dirtbombs	2:20
5.	"I'll Wait"	George Clinton	The Parliaments	3:00
6.	"Living For the City"	Stevie Wonder	Stevie Wonder	3:07
7.	"The Thing"	Larry Bright	Larry Bright	2:02
8.	"Kung-Fu"	Curtis Mayfield	Curtis Mayfield	5:42
9.	"Ode to a Black Man"	Phil Lynott	Phil Lynott	3:38
10.	"Got to Give It Up"	Marvin Gaye	Marvin Gaye	4:03
11.	"Livin' For the Weekend"	Kenny Gamble, Cary Gilbert, Leon Huff	The O'Jays	3:29
12.	"I'm Qualified to Satisfy You"	Barry White	Barry White	3:53
13.	"Do You See My Love (For You Growing)"	R. Beavers, Johnny Bristol	Junior Walker & the All-Stars	4:20
