= M. L. Liebler =

American writer (born 1953)

M. L. Liebler (born Michael Lynn Liebler in 1953 in Detroit, Michigan) is the author and editor of several books of poetry including Brooding in the Heartlands. He is a senior lecturer at Wayne State University, Detroit, Michigan.

== Selected writings ==
- Working Words:Punching the Clock & Kicking Out the Jams, Coffee House Press (2010)
- Wide Awake in Someone Else's Dream, Wayne State University Press (2008) ISBN 0-8143-3382-6
- Stripping the Adult Century Bare, Burning Cities Press (1995) ISBN 1-885215-09-6
- Deliver Me, Ridgeway Press (1991) ISBN 1-56439-006-3
- Breaking the Voodoo, Parkville Press (1990) ISBN 0-925570-20-6
