= The Past Was Faster =

The Past Was Faster is a 1999 album by San Francisco musician and songwriter Kelley Stoltz. It was his first official release and was released on December 14, 2001.

The songs on the album were written over a period of five years and were recorded by Stoltz on his 4-track tape recorder at home.

== Track listing ==
1. "X-Ray Eyes" (3:35)
2. "Popular Diseases" (3:53)
3. "Fog Has Lifted" (3:17)
4. "Emerald Stew" (4:08)
5. "Permafrost" (4:07)
6. "Cardinal Body" (4:30)
7. "Sculptures Floating on the Waves" (4:04)
8. "Captain" (3:47)
9. "Vapor Trail" (5:21)
10. "Peppermint" (3:27)
11. "Lonely Star State" (19:43)

== Reception ==
Professional ratings
Review scores
| Source | Rating |
|---|---|
| AllMusic | 4/5 stars |
| Pitchfork | 3.5/10 |
| PopMatters | 8/10 stars |

Critics have mixed reception on The Past Was Faster. On the one hand, Pitchfork heavily panned the album, calling it "a collection of mediocre, generally bad lo-fi". On the other hand, PopMatters said the album "deserves an adoring audience who’ll embrace it, flaws and all". Sean Westergaard of AllMusic called the album a "tour de force".
