= Sonny Smith (musician) =

American dramatist and musician

Sonny Smith (born 1972) is an American musician, playwright and multimedia artist from San Francisco. He has released fourteen albums since 2000, largely with group Sonny & The Sunsets. His work has variously encompassed blues, folk, pop and rock elements. AllMusic noted that his 2002 album, This Is My Story, This Is My Song, lifted him from obscurity to cult status.

Smith is a songwriter in the tradition of Ray Davies whose songs are often populated by characters with an emphasis on outcasts, weirdos, freaks, death, love and atypical transformation. They sometimes recall the 1950s era doo wop of The Falcons combined with the direct sincerity and positive spirit of Modern Lovers’ Jonathan Richman, the kitchen sink wisdom of Michael Hurley and the absurdity of The Hairy Who? art collective, as well as the dark confessional humor of cartoonists like Robert Crumb.

== Life and work ==
Smith began playing blues piano in bars when he was seventeen years old. Skipping between the Rocky Mountains of Denver, San Francisco, and Central America, he began to write original songs, short stories and plays. Smith's travels in Central America inspired his narrative approach and original style of folk music. AllMusic noted that his 2002 album, This Is My Story, This Is My Song, lifted him from obscurity to cult status.

In 2003, Smith was commissioned by Watchword literary magazine to make a CD of one-act plays delivered as songs. This project led Smith in a new direction, incorporating theatre and dialogue into his evolving approach to music. At the Headlands Center for the Arts, he was awarded a residency in May 2005 to create a feature-length musical, The Dangerous Stranger, which included guest performers such as the folk singer Jolie Holland, local singer Peggy Honeywell (artist Clare Rojas), Miranda July, and set designer Daniel Tierney.

With the Release of Tomorrow Is Alright on Fat Possum, Sonny & the Sunsets began to tour more extensively through US, Europe, Australia and Japan. That record received critical acclaim and a cult status. The songs were small noir like comic book episodes, Robert Crumb meets Randy Newman, set to garage rock inspired doo-wop music reminiscent of The Kinks.

In a 2010 interview with Songwriters on Process, Smith described his songwriting process as follows:

"I’ll write lyrics down, or what I think is a songwriter’s version of poetry, then tinker with it musically. If you were to look at my notebook, it’s all brainstorming: little sentences and fractured words. Nothing too cohesive. At the same time, I’ll strum chords around the house or just try to copy some great song. I might ape it a little and find some direction rhythmically. Once I get that direction, I look at my notes and see if any of those words leap out."

Smith founded Rocks in Your Head Records in 2018, where he has produced and released music for Sonny & The Sunsets and other artists.

== Work with Sonny & The Sunsets ==
To date, Sonny and the Sunsets has released 12 albums and three singles and EP. Most work was released on Polyvinyl Records, with newer work released on Smith's label, Rocks in Your Head.

=== Hit After Hit ===
Smith's 2010 release Hit After Hit pulls influence from 50's and 60's rock. The album goes back to basics short songs, simple harmonization, and surfy guitar sounds.

In an interview with Consequence of Sound, Smith said the album's title was originally a “cool boxing reference.” It was written and recorded at the same time as the 100 Records Project. The album was released on Fat Possum Records.

=== Longtime Companion ===
Longtime Companion is Sonny & The Sunset's first country-inspired album. According to Smith, it is a breakup album written during his breakup with his girlfriend of 10 years.

The album was recorded to tape and takes influence from Gene Clark, The Flying Burrito Brothers, Townes Van Zandt, Johnny Cash and The Kinks.

Songs on the album include hits like Pretend You Love Me and I See The Void, which were rereleased on later albums.

=== Antenna to the Afterworld ===
Sonny and The Sunset's 2013 album, Antenna to the Afterworld, was written about paranormal experiences Smith had after experiencing the loss of a friend.

=== Talent Night at the Ashram ===
Talent Night at the Ashram was originally envisioned by Smith as a film project, with each song being a short film that formed a feature-length movie.

Recording mostly took place at Smith's home on a tape machine. He collaborated on the album with artists like Shayde Sartin of The Fresh & Onlys, Garret Goddard of King Tuff, Kelley Stoltz, Rusty Miller and Ian McBrayer.

=== Moods Baby Moods ===
Moods Baby Moods was Sonny & The Sunset's 2016 release that took on a post- disco funk and new wave aesthetic.

The album focuses on finding “purpose in the cruel realities of the modern age” and making sense of modern-day issues. The song “Modern Age” highlights computer created confusion and “White Cop on Trial” discusses the civil rights abuse.

The album was produced by Merrill Garbus of tUnE-yArDs.

=== Hairdressers From Heaven ===
Hairdressers From Heaven is Sonny & The Sunset's 2019 release, and the first record released by Smith's Rocks in Your Head record label. Smith has said this album was to be more like a mixtape, filled with “different sounds, different musicians".

=== New Day with New Possibilities ===
Sonny & The Sunset's 2021 release embodied country and western influence. In an interview with New Noise, Smith notes that he did not originally set out to write an album during the height of the COVID-19 pandemic, but that the songs came to him as the crisis went on.

Smith's Bandcamp says the following on the album:

“It was before Covid, I had this big free empty studio in the hills, I was supposed to be painting, that was my initial plan, and I just began making songs on an old guitar, songs about being alone, songs about failed men, some dark tales of longing. I was reading some old western paperbacks, and I would go on these walks in the hills, come inside and write these kind of lonesome country songs. Then the pandemic began, and everyone was alone now, and it felt like it had been strangely prescient to write about being alone”

The album title and cover art takes inspiration from a painting by artist Chris Johanson. Much of the album was written and recorded alone during the pandemic, though Smith later collaborated with steel guitar player Joe Goldmark, Rusty Miller and Dylan Edrich.

== Solo albums ==
=== Sees All Knows All ===
Sees Knows All is Smith's 2016 solo release. The album is a monologue was self-described as a “bohemian quarter-life crisis” and a tale of “love, sex, drugs, spaceships, romance, hallucinations, bitter tears, and champagne.”

Smith premiered the album at The Lost Church in San Francisco. The premier lasted three nights, featuring a different guest musician each night. The lineup included Kelley Stoltz, Tim Cohen (The Fresh & Onlys and Magic Trick), Kyle Field (Little Wings), Alexi Glickman (Sandy's), and Sun Foot (Chris Johanson)

=== Rod for Your Love ===
Smith's tenth studio release, Rod For Your Love, was released in 2018. The album embraced 60's guitar pop which was a departure from his last two releases, which were largely folk-influenced. The lyrics largely focus on romance and the struggle of daily life. The album was recorded with Dan Auerbach of The Black Keys at Auerbach's studio in Nashville, Tennessee.

== 100 Records ==
For a 2010 project called 100 Records, first exhibited at Gallery 16 in San Francisco and later at Cinders in Williamsburg, Brooklyn, Smith invited 100 artists to produce artwork for the record covers of fictional bands.

Smith concocted the personas of all 100 fictitious bands, then wrote and recorded two hundred songs (the A-side and B-side) for each. Smith displayed all the original album artwork as well as a jukebox, that played all two hundred songs recorded by Sonny Smith and other musicians. Artists who participated in the project include Reed Anderson, Alika Cooper, Chris Duncan, Harrell Fletcher, Jo Jackson, Chris Johanson, Tucker Nichols, Ed Ruscha, Paul Wackers and William T. Wiley.

100 Records was later released in two volumes. Volume One was released on Gallery 16 Records and Volume Two on Turn It Up Records.

== Earth Girl Helen Brown ==
Earth Girl Helen Brown is an offshoot of the 100 Records project, featuring fictional character Helen Brown. The character was originally created by Smith for the project, but was later embodied by Heidi Alexander, previously of The Sandwitches.

“Helen Brown was born in Vancouver, Canada, but raised in an Athens, Georgia-based religious cult, and was blinded in one eye from a childhood baseball injury. As an adult, she dropped out of Evergreen and traveled the country for a while as a nomadic psychedelic folksinger, before forming her first band One Eyed Tramps. For years, she lived alone in a mountaintop in southern Alaska, where she befriended a Cherokee Shaman (later revealed as a fake) who encouraged her to pursue a frustrating academic career. Rampant drug use, frequent fainting on stage, and occasional self-inflicted knife wounds on stage led to more interest in her stage antics than her music. However, a few sides did emerge in the late ’90s (recording dates unknown), which feature a unique mix of country, girl group, R&B, and ghoulishness. Crude and amateurish at best, these recordings are appreciated for their sincerity and intensity of feeling.” - Sonny Smith

Alexander continues to release music under the Earth Girl Helen Brown name on Empty Cellar Records.

== Producer and Rocks in Your Head Records ==
Smith has produced albums for Sonny & The Sunsets, related acts and other artists through his label, Rocks in Your Head, and others.

He holds production credits for the following albums:

- Tomorrow is Alright – Sonny & the Sunsets (Fat Possum)
- Hit After Hit – Sonny & the Sunsets (Fat Possum)
- Story of An Earth Girl – Earth Girl Helen Brown (Rocks In You rHead)
- Antenna to the Afterworld — Sonny & the Sunsets (Polyvinyl)
- Talent Night at the Ashram – Sonny & the Sunsets (Polyvinyl)
- Gone By the Dawn. – Shannon And The Clams (Hardly Art Records)
- A Swirling Fire Burning Through The Rhye – The Cool Ghouls (Empty Cellar)
- Galore – Galore (Rocks In Your Head)
- At The Time I Didn't Care — Virgil Shaw (Rocks In Your Head)
- I walk to the railroad tracks and follow them to the station of my enemies — Tongo Eisen-Martin (Rocks In Your Head)

Smith founded Rocks in Your Head records in 2018, where he has produced and released music for Sonny & The Sunsets and other bands such as Galore, Fake Fruit, the Gonks, poet Tongo Eisen-Martin and more.

== Discography ==
=== Albums ===
- Who's The Monster...You Or Me? (Self-released 2000)
- This Is My Story, This Is My Song (Jackpine Social Club 2002)
- Sordid Tales of Love and Woe (Self-released 2003)
- One Act Plays (self-released 2005)
- Fruitvale (Belle Sound 2007)
- Tomorrow is Alright (LP Soft Abuse / Secret Seven 2009; CD Fat Possum 2010)
- Hit After Hit (Fat Possum 2011)
- Longtime Companion (Polyvinyl Record Co. 2012)
- Antenna to the Afterworld (Polyvinyl Record Co. 2013)
- Talent Night at the Ashram (Polyvinyl Record Co. 2015)
- Moods Baby Moods (Polyvinyl Record Co. 2016)
- Sees All Knows All (Empty Cellar Records 2016)
- Rod for Your Love (Easy Eye Sound 2018)
- Hairdressers From Heaven (Rocks In Your Head Records 2019)

=== Singles and EPs ===
- "Love & Death" 7-inch + comic book (Soft Abuse 2009)
- "Broom & Dustpan" 7-inch (Home Skillet 2009)
- "The Hypnotist" 7-inch (Future Stress 2010)
- "Sonny & The Sandwitches" 7-inch EP (Empty Cellar Records 2010)

=== Box sets and compilation albums ===
- Untitled (CDr, Comp) (self-released 2010)
- 100 Records CD/box Volume 1 (Gallery 16 2010)
- 100 Records Volume 2: I Miss The Jams (Turn Up Records 2010)
- 100 Records Volume 3 (Glitter End Records 2012)
- 100 Records Volume 1 (Polyvinyl Record Company 2013)
