= Kelley Stoltz =

American singer, songwriter and musician (born 1971)

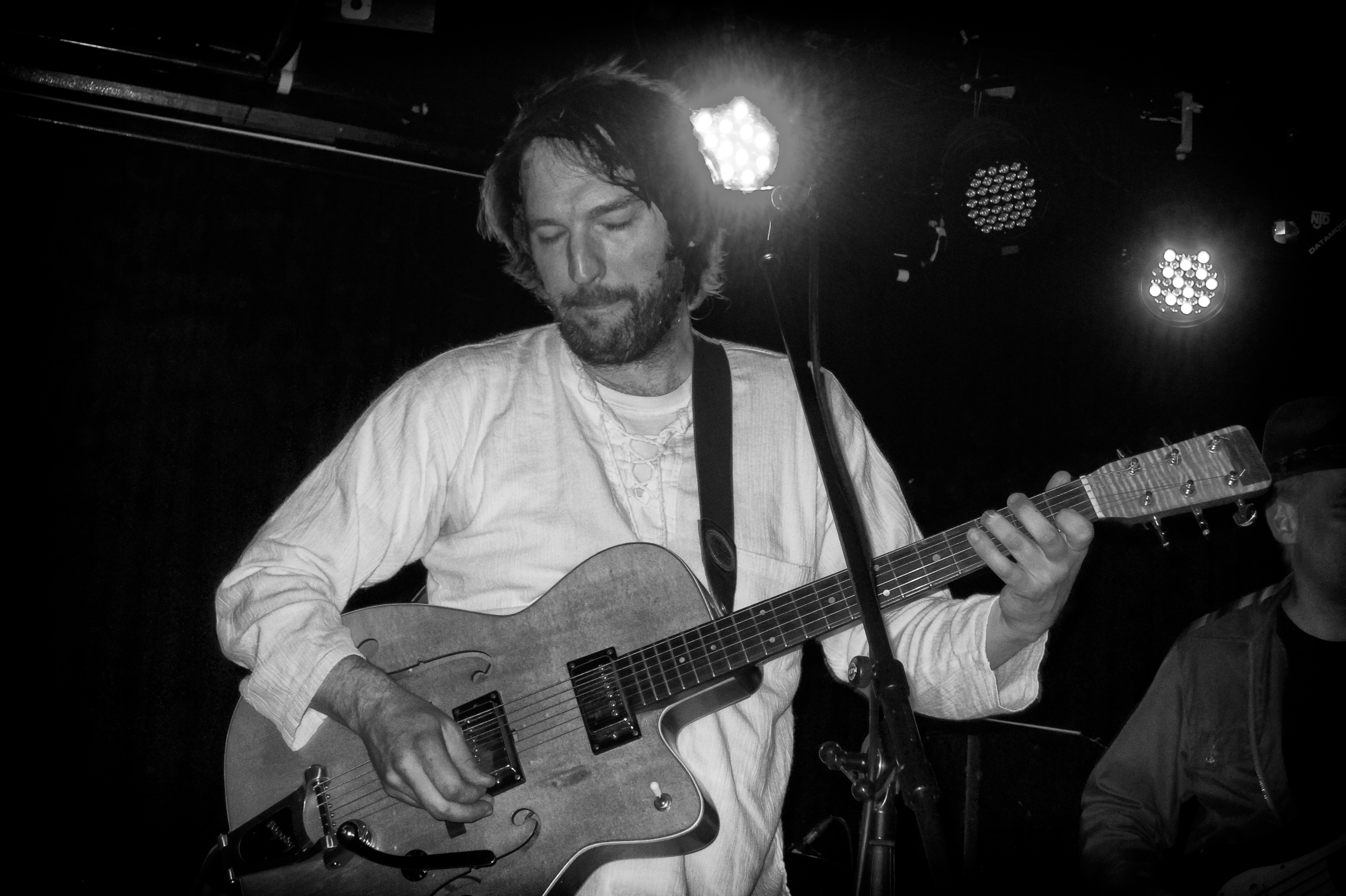
- Stoltz performing in 2014

Background information
- Born: Richard Kelley Stoltz; September 21, 1971 (age 55); New York City, U.S.
- Origin: Birmingham, Michigan, U.S.
- Genres: Indie rock; psychedelic rock; power pop
- Occupations: Musician; songwriter; record producer
- Instruments: Vocals; guitar; piano; drums
- Years active: 1999–present
- Labels: Sub Pop; Castle Face; Third Man
- Website: kelleystoltz.com

Kelley Stoltz (born September 21, 1971) is an American singer, songwriter and musician. He currently resides in San Francisco. His music has been compared to that of Brian Wilson, Velvet Underground, Nick Drake and Leonard Cohen.

== Musical career ==
Kelley Stoltz was born in New York City in 1971 and grew up in Birmingham, Michigan. He moved to New York City in his early twenties. While living in New York in the mid-1990s, Stoltz served as an intern with Jeff Buckley's management company where he worked as a "fan-mail" sorter. In the late 1990s he relocated to San Francisco and began his own musical career. Stoltz recorded his first album The Past Was Faster in 1999, released on Telegraph Records. Stoltz self-released his second album Antique Glow in 2001. The original release was 300 vinyl LPs in hand-painted sleeves. Later the album gained wider distribution when it was released by Jackpine Social Club in the US, Beautiful Happiness in the UK and Raoul Records in Australia. His next project was recorded in the last week of 2001: a track by track cover of Echo & the Bunnymen's Crocodiles album, recorded on his eight-track tape recorder.

In late 2003, Stoltz toured Australia for the first time and recorded a 4 track direct to disc EP at Corduroy Records. In 2004, Mojo Magazine gave Antique Glow a four (out of five) star review and featured an article on Stoltz in their "Mojo Rising" column. In 2005, Stoltz signed to Sub Pop and released "The Sun Comes Through" EP. He also toured Europe in April and Australia for a second time in Dec 2005-January 2006. His first full-length release for Sub Pop, entitled "Below the Branches", was released in February 2006.

In tandem with the release of "Below the Branches" was an industry first: "Below the Branches" was the first record in history to make an on-package claim about renewable energy use with the Green-e logo. Stoltz tracked his electricity use and with the help of the Green-e program, offset all the electricity used to record his record with green tags from the Bonneville Environmental Foundation. In Kelley's words: “Using renewable energy to offset the electricity I needed to power my guitar amps and my recording machines was a simple and effective way for me to do something about my impact on the environment. Green-e certifies that I am buying 100 percent renewable energy. Hopefully, people will see their logo; check into what they do, and make renewable energy a part of their lives, too."

Stoltz and his band were the opening support band for The Raconteurs, on their July and August 2006 tour. Stoltz also performed at the 2006 Lollapalooza in Chicago. His song "Birdies Singing" from "Below the Branches" has been used by Volvo for the Volvo C30 commercial in Sweden in 2007; it has also been used for the Regions Financial ad campaign of 2007 in the U.S. Stoltz's song, "Memory Collector" is featured in a Marriott Hotels ad, and several of his songs were used in the hit FX series, "Damages." In early 2006, Stoltz produced God's Boat, the debut album from The Passionistas, which was released on June 5, 2007. He also produced or worked on other Bay Area albums: Oh Sees - Sucks Blood, Bart Davenport - Palaces, Moore Brothers - Aptos and Colossal Yes - Charlemagne's Big Thaw.

On February 5, 2008, Stoltz's album Circular Sounds was released by Sub Pop. In 2010 he opened for his heroes Echo & the Bunnymen on a North American tour, after the scheduled opening group was waylaid by the 2010 Icelandic volcano eruption.

In October 2010, Sub Pop released Stoltz's album To Dreamers. Stoltz also appeared on Sonny Smith's Sonny and the Sunsets album Tomorrow is Alright.

In 2012, Stoltz played keyboards, along with members of the Fresh & Onlys, in the backing band to songwriter Rodriguez during a string of live concerts.

In September 2013, Double Exposure was released on Third Man Records. He and his band served as opening act for Jack White on his Lazaretto tour.

After recording an EP and a further album under a pseudonym, Stoltz's next proper album, In Triangle Time, was released in November 2015.

Stoltz played rhythm guitar in Echo & the Bunnymen on their UK, European and US tours in 2016 and 2018.

He released Que Aura on Castle Face Records on August 12, 2017. This was followed by Natural Causes on Banana & Louie Records, issued on February 21, 2018. My Regime was released on Banana & Louie Records in September 2019. Stoltz supported Ezra Furman on her US tour in February and March 2020.

== Discography ==
=== Albums ===
- The Past Was Faster (1999)
- Antique Glow (2001)
- Australian Tour LP (2003)
- Crockodials (2006)
- Below the Branches (2006, Sub Pop)
- Circular Sounds (2008, Sub Pop)
- To Dreamers (2010, Sub Pop)
- Double Exposure (2013, Third Man Records)
- The Scuzzy Inputs of Willie Weird LP (2015, Stroll On Records) Under the pseudonym "Willie Weird"
- In Triangle Time LP (2015, Castle Face Records)
- Que Aura LP (2017, Castle Face Records)
- STRAT - Live at the Whammy Bar LP (2017, Puzzle Records)
- Transnational Series Vol 1 LP (2017, La Suisse Primitive) Split LP with Augenwasser
- Natural Causes LP (2018, Banana & Louie Records)
- My Regime LP (2019, Banana & Louie Records)
- Falcon/Falkland - Energy Beats Perfection LP (2019, Chuffed Records)
- Hard Feelings LP (2020, Chuffed Records)
- Ah! (etc) LP (2020, Agitated Records)
- The Stylist LP (2022, Agitated Records)
- La Fleur LP (2024, Agitated Records)
- If You Don't Know Me, Buy Now (2026, Agitated Records)

=== EPs ===
- Live to Acetate (2004, Corduroy Records)
- The Sun Comes Through EP (2005, Sub Pop)
- With My Face on the Floor 7-inch EP (2006, Art School Drop Out)
- 4 New Cuts EP (2015, Stroll On Records)

=== Singles ===
- "Discount City"/"84 Tigers" 7-inch (2004, Cass Records)
- "Baby I Got News for You"/"Fire Escape" (2009, Chuffed)
- "Two Imaginary Girls"7-inch (2012, Les Disques Steak)
- "My Baby Always Knows (What Time It Is)" 7-inch (2008, Cass Records) Split tour single with the Dirtbombs
- "Your Reverie"/"Owl Service" (2008, Sub Pop)
- "Cross Your Mind"/"The Anarchist in Me" (2013. Stroll On Records)
- "YTAWFUMB"/"PublicTV" 7-inch (2016 Fueled By Grappa)

=== Engineering and production ===
- "Gods's Boat" The Passionistas
- "Sucks Blood" Thee Oh Sees
- "Palaces" Bart Davenport
- "Aptos" The Moore Brothers
- "Charlemagne's Big Thaw" Colossal Yes
- Virgil Shaw
- "Fast Moving Clouds" Sarah Bethe Nelson
- "Long Enough to Leave" The Mantles
- "Rays" Rays
- "And Then a Shovelful of Dirt…" Life Stinks
- "You Can Get There from Here" Rays
- "You'll Never Make It" Life Stinks
- "Wolf Lie Down" Fresh & Onlys
- Dots
- Uke Hunt
