= Dangerous Magical Noise =

Studio album by The Dirtbombs
- Released: November 4, 2003
- Recorded: May 2003
- Genre: Garage rock
- Label: In the Red
- Producer: Jim Diamond

The Dirtbombs chronology
| Ultraglide in Black (2001) | Dangerous Magical Noise (2003) | If You Don't Already Have a Look (2005) |

Professional ratings
Review scores
| Source | Rating |
|---|---|
| Allmusic | 4/5 stars |
| Guy Peters | (7.5/10) |
| Mojo | 4/5 stars |
| Pitchfork Media | (8.2/10) |
| Q | 3/5 stars |
| Uncut | 3/5 stars |

Dangerous Magical Noise is an album by the American rock music group The Dirtbombs.

== Track listing ==
1. "Start the Party" – 1:41
2. "Get It While You Can" – 2:25
3. "Don't Break My Heart" – 1:43
4. "Sun is Shining" – 2:37
5. "Earthquake Heart" – 2:23
6. "Thunder in the Sky" - 3:38
7. "Motor City Baby" – 3:02
8. "Stuck in thee Garage" – 2:00
9. "I'm Through With White Girls " (Diamond) – 3:02
10. "21st Century Fox" – 3:30
11. "Stop" – 3:46
12. "Stupid" - 2:19
13. "F.I.D.O." – 4:27

The first 1,000 copies of the CD contain two bonus songs: covers of Brian Eno's "King's Lead Hat" and Robyn Hitchcock's "Executioner of Love".

The first 1,000 copies of the vinyl LPs come with a bonus 7" with two covers of songs by the Cheater Slicks: "Refried Dream" and "Possession".

== Personnel ==
- Ben Blackwell Drums
- Patrick Pantano Drums
- Mick Collins guitar
- Tom Potter Fuzz Bass
- Jim Diamond bass
