= Demolition Doll Rods =

American rock band

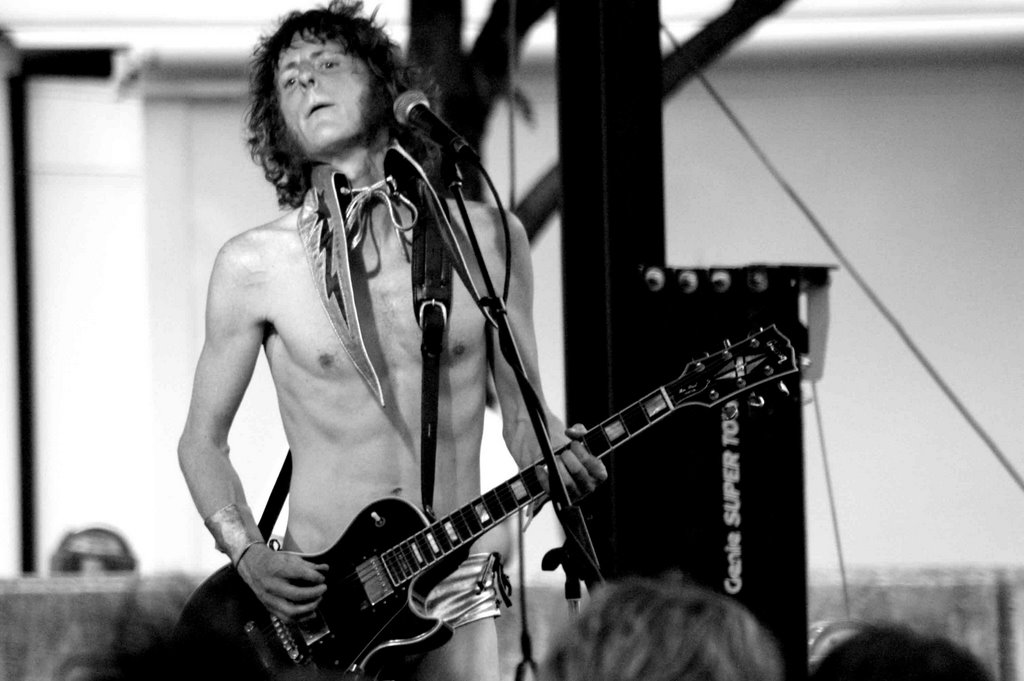
- Danny Doll Rod playing at Tastefest '06 in Detroit

Background information
- Origin: Detroit, Michigan, U.S.
- Genres: Glam rock, garage rock
- Years active: 1994–2007
- Members: Dan Kroha; Margaret Doll Rod; Tia "Baby T" Dollrod
- Past members: Christine Doll Rod

The Demolition Doll Rods were an American three-piece glam/garage rock band from Detroit, Michigan. The band, known for outré stage attire, released its first record in 1994. The original line up included Dan Kroha as Danny Doll Rod (formerly of The Gories) on guitar, vocals, and harmonies, Margaret Doll Rod on guitar and lead vocals, and songwriting, Christine Doll Rod, also known as 'The Thump'/Thumper/Thumpurr on drums. In March 2006 Christine went on "maternity leave" and was replaced by Tia "Baby T" Dollrod.

== History ==
The band first found national exposure in the mid-1990s on the second stage at Lollapalooza and as an opening act for, respectively, Iggy Pop, The Jon Spencer Blues Explosion, and The Cramps. The band's sound has been influenced primarily by other famous Motor City rockers like the MC5 and the Stooges. Their stage performances have been likened to those of the New York Dolls, and also The Cramps; the band members appearing in drag or in costume, occasionally wearing food items and often almost nothing at all. One memorable performance featured the band performing with only toy cartoon mouse heads covering their breasts, and only plastic wrap and semi-strategically placed slices of Swiss cheese covering their nether regions. In the last few years of their existence they wore leather pieces that they had made by Tom the Leatherman who designed costumes for Parliament/Funkadelic in the late 1970s.

The Doll Rods played a genre-crossing, minimalist Detroit rock style incorporating rhythm and blues and garage rock. The three piece band featured lead and rhythm guitars backed by a basic bass-drum-floor-tom-and-snare drum kit. Their lyrics made frequent reference to sex, drug overdoses, drag racing, boys, girls, dogs, and cats.

== Break up ==
On April 4, 2007, Dan Kroha posted the following message to the band's Myspace page:

To all our beloved and loyal fans . . . This is Danny. I have decided that after thirteen years of non-stop Doll Rod action, it is time for me to take a break for a while (don't really know how long). I am very proud of all we've done as a band and I want to thank everyone who has loved and supported us all these years.

The band has since been inactive, with members concentrating on other musical projects. Margaret Doll Rod released the solo LP Enchanté on the Rockin' Bones label and formed the band Heartthrob Chassis, who signed with Milan Records. Dan Kroha performs solo and leads the band Danny and the Darleans, in addition to occasional touring with a reformed Gories.

== Discography ==
=== Singles ===
- "The Demolition Doll Rods" (Womb/Past It Records – 1994)
- "The Unauthorized Demolition Doll Rods: African Lipstick/Down Home Girl" (Bulb Records – BLB-036 – 1994)
- "Spoiled Kitty/Walkin' the Dog" (In The Red Records – 1995)
- "Power Cruise/You Gotta Do That Do!" (Wantage USA Records – 1995)
- "I Wanna O.D./Dream" (Bag Of Hammers Records – 1996)
- "Bride" (ProA.S.S – 2000)
- "Big Rock Candy Mountain/Hot Pink Visqueen" (Munster Records – 2003)

=== Albums ===
- Tasty (1997 – In The Red Records)
- Tla (1999 – Matador Records)
- On (2004 – Swami Records)
- There Is a Difference (2006 Swami Records)
