= The Original Recordings =

The Original Recordings (Singles and Unreleased 1994-1997)

Compilation album by The Detroit Cobras
- Released: June 20, 2008.
- Genre: Garage Soul
- Label: Munster

The Original Recordings (Singles and Unreleased 1994-1997) is a compilation album put together by founding members of The Detroit Cobras, and their fifth release. The album includes the original line up’s earliest recordings, made in 1994, 1995, 1996, out takes from their first LP (1997)and other unreleased tracks.

Lost and Found Album Art

This album was going to be released by Sympathy for the Record Industry as Lost and Found in 2004, but complications arose with the current and former members of the band, so the project was temporarily scrapped. Munster Records in Spain was successful in reaching an agreement with all parties involved and released the LP in three different formats, 12" LP, CD and 7" 45 boxset, each including a detailed history of the early years and formation of the group.

== Track listing ==
1. Village of Love

  (recorded 1994)

  - Original by Nathaniel Mayer
1. Maria Christina

  (recorded 1995)

  - Original by Tony Valla And The Alamos
1. Over To My House

  (recorded 1994)

  - Original by Geeshie Wiley & Elvie Thomas
1. Sad Affair

  (recorded 1994)

  - Original by Lee Rodgers
1. Down in Louisiana

  (recorded 1995)

  - Original by Polka Dot Slim
1. Ain't It a Shame

  (recorded 1994)

  - Original by Question Mark and the Mysterians
1. Slum Lord

  (Recorded 1996)

  - Original by The Deviants
1. It's Raining

  (Recorded 1994)

  - Original by Irma Thomas
1. Cha Cha Twist

  (Recorded 1997)

1. Funnel of Love

  (Recorded 1996)

  - Original by Wanda Jackson
1. I've Got A Feeling

  (Recorded 1997)

  - Original by Baby Washington
1. Time Changes Things

  (Recorded 1997)

  - Original by The Supremes
1. Brainwashed

  (Recorded 1997)

  - Original by The Kinks
1. Curly Haired Baby

  (Recorded 1995)

  - Original by Roy Byrd
- Cobras covered the Professor Longhair version

1. With Body and Soul

  (Recorded 1995)

  - Original by Bill Monroe

== Personnel ==
- Rachel Nagy - Lead Vocals/Violin
- Maribel (Mary) Restrepo - Guitar/Harmonica
- Steve Shaw - Guitar/Vocals/Percussion
- Jeff Meier - Bass Guitar/Vocals
- Victor Hill - Drums
- Chris Fachini - Drums
- Damian Lang - Drums
- Jim Shaw (as Shakey James) - Tambourine on “Maria Christina “
