= Gino Washington =

American singer

- Born: 1946 (age 79–80)
- Origin: Detroit, Michigan
- Genres: R&B; rock and roll; Northern soul
- Years active: 1963–1964, 1967

George "Gino" Washington (born 1946) is an American singer from Detroit, Michigan. During his recording career, Washington recorded in the genres of rhythm and blues, rock and roll and Northern soul. While attending Pershing High School, he achieved local hits in 1963 and 1964: "Out of This World" and "Gino Is a Coward". To his credit, he was the first artist signed to Ric-Tic Records. In 1964 he was drafted into the U.S. Army, serving in Japan and South Vietnam; upon return his music career stalled. He hosted his own variety television show in Detroit during the 1970s.
