= Jim Diamond (music producer) =

- Genres: Indie rock, rock and roll
- Occupations: Audio engineer, record producer
- Instruments: Vocals, bass guitar, guitar
- Years active: 1995–present
- Label: Ghetto Recorders

Jim Diamond is an American music producer, studio engineer, and bass guitar player based in Detroit, Michigan. He worked on the first two White Stripes albums and played bass with The Dirtbombs.

== Background ==
Jim Diamond started playing saxophone and classical guitar at 10 years old. By 13 years old he was playing bass guitar in a rock band called Inferno. Later in high school, he also played guitar and sang in a band called The Neo Plastics. In 1983, Diamond graduated from Trenton High School, in Trenton, Michigan. In 1988, he went on to get a Telecommunications degree (with a minor in music) from Michigan State University. During his college years he sang and played guitar in the "speed gold" band, "The Wayouts".

In 1995, after college, Diamond started working at Harvest Music and Sound Design in Lansing, MI. At Harvest Music, Diamond worked on "car commercials and Christian metal," he later remembered. He then moved to Austin, Texas, and started playing guitar and bass with such bands as the Beatosonics, Herman the German and Das Cowboy.

Diamond returned to Detroit and started Ghetto Recorders in the fall of 1996. Diamond was also a longtime member of the popular Detroit band The Dirtbombs. Diamond wrote and performed the vocals on the tune "I'm Through With White Girls." The song appears on the Dirtbombs studio album Dangerous Magical Noise and the compilation CD Sympathetic Sounds of Detroit, which was recorded by Jack White. Diamond had to close Ghetto Recorders in the spring of 2015 as the building was being re purposed into a high end apartment in Detroit's downtown.

Diamond currently splits his time between Detroit and Europe, and is still quite active as a music producer, engineer and musician.

== Ghetto Recorders ==
Jim Diamond ran Ghetto Recorders, an analog recording studio in a loft and apartment space in downtown Detroit, taking over the recording site and equipment from John Linardos, who went on to help start up the first microbrewery in Detroit. The studio contains equipment that is at least 20 years old. He uses a 2" 24-track tape machine among other mixing boards and various equipment.

Ghetto Recorders studio was originally a chicken processing factory in the 1920s and 30s. The control room (where the recording equipment is) used to be the freezer where the factory stored the chickens. Ghetto Recorders first release was by the spazzy, garage-punk duo Bantam Rooster, fronted by Diamond's long-time friend, Thomas J. Potter.

=== Collaborations ===
On the Motorcity Brewing Works' live compilation "GhettoBlaster," Diamond appeared as the front man for "Jim Diamond's Pop Monsoon." As proprietor and chief engineer at Ghetto Recorders, Diamond has worked with, and in some cases helped launch the careers of, several indie rock performers, including The High Strung, The Dirtbombs, The Fleshtones, Electric Six, The Pack A.D., Left Lane Cruiser, The Laundronauts, The Legendary Tigerman, Bantam Rooster, Rockfour, The Gore Gore Girls, The Mooney Suzuki, The Compulsive Gamblers, The Dirtys, Lost Kids, The Ponys, The Silencers, The Go, The Hentchmen, Screamray, Thee Emergency, Outrageous Cherry, Paik, The Clone Defects, The Charms, They Come In Threes, The Sights, The Volebeats, The White Stripes, The Sonics, The Devils, Archie and the Bunkers, The Grinding Eyes, Hymn For Her, Rodriguez, The Exploding Eyes, The Cambodian Space Project, OhGunQuit, Keith Richards overdose (French Band) and more.

Diamond also composed and performed songs for the 2005 horror/comedy movie Santa's Slay which is distributed by Lionsgate.

In 2016, Diamond recorded with the newly formed Lansing trio, Luxury Flux. The album will be available April 21, 2017.
