= Mick Collins =

American singer-songwriter

Background information
- Born: December 18, 1965 (age 60)
- Origin: Detroit, Michigan, U.S.
- Genre: Garage punk
- Occupations: singer, actor, computer programmer
- Instruments: vocals, guitar, vox organ
- Label: various

Mick Collins (born December 18, 1965) is a musician from Detroit, Michigan.

== Biography ==
Collins first received exposure to early rock and roll music through his family's record collection. Living in Detroit, he was also surrounded by the music released from Motown Records. This also provided an influence to his musical evolution.

Collins first played in a band called the U-Boats in 1981 and then in the Floor Tasters from 1984 to 1985. In 1986, the 20-year-old Collins helped form the garage punk band, The Gories. The band featured Collins on guitar, Dan Kroha (later of the Demolition Doll Rods) on guitar, and Peg O'Neil on the drums. After three albums and five singles the band broke up after a 1992 European tour.

Collins next worked in a garage rock band, Blacktop, from 1994 to 1996. After the demise of Blacktop, Collins helped form the King Sound Quartet, which had one single in 1996 and one album, The Get Down Imperative, in 1997.

Collins then focused on another of his projects, the wide-ranging, musically eclectic Dirtbombs. The Dirtbombs initially had a changing shift of musicians backing up Collins on guitar. Since 2004 has had a steady lineup. Throughout its history, the band has consisted of a 2-drum, 2-bass set-up behind Collins' guitar work.

In addition to the Dirtbombs, Collins has played in the Screws, an eclectic punk band that has released two albums since 1999 and has appeared on several compilations. He also played music with the Voltaire Brothers, a funk project that issued a 2002 album, I Sing The Booty Electric. He also has performed solo work, including issuing a split 7-inch vinyl with Lorrette Velvette for the film Wayne County Ramblin,' in which Collins additionally performed a role as an actor. Collins has produced the music of other artists, including Andre Williams. He also DJ's, and does vocals on another long-time side project, Man Ray, Man Ray.

Collins was the host of Night Train, a Saturday night show on WDET, Detroit Public Radio. The program featured four thematic "journeys" through music. The first edition premiered on June 3, 2006, and included musical journeys of Motown soul legends Junior Walker & The All-Stars, Jazz artist Joe Williams, 1950s rock 'n roll star Fats Domino, and 1980s Detroit garage band The Hysteric Narcotics. The show was canceled in spring 2007 after WDET scrapped its music programming.

Collins was the producer of the CD "Drop Dead" by Figures of Light, which was recorded in Brooklyn, New York at Mitro's Studios June 2011, featuring fifteen new tracks from the group. It was released on vinyl by Norton Records on November 13, 2011; the remastered CD version was released on May 18, 2012.

Since 2015, Collins has been a member of Wolfmanhattan Project, a supergroup also featuring Kid Congo Powers and Bob Bert. As of 2024, the band has released one single and two albums, all with In the Red Records.

Collins is a noted fan and collector of furry comics. The Dirtbombs song "Burnt to Cinders" is "dedicated to furry fandom" and its parent album Horndog Fest features artwork by furry artist Joe Rosales.
