= Blanche (band) =

American alternative country band

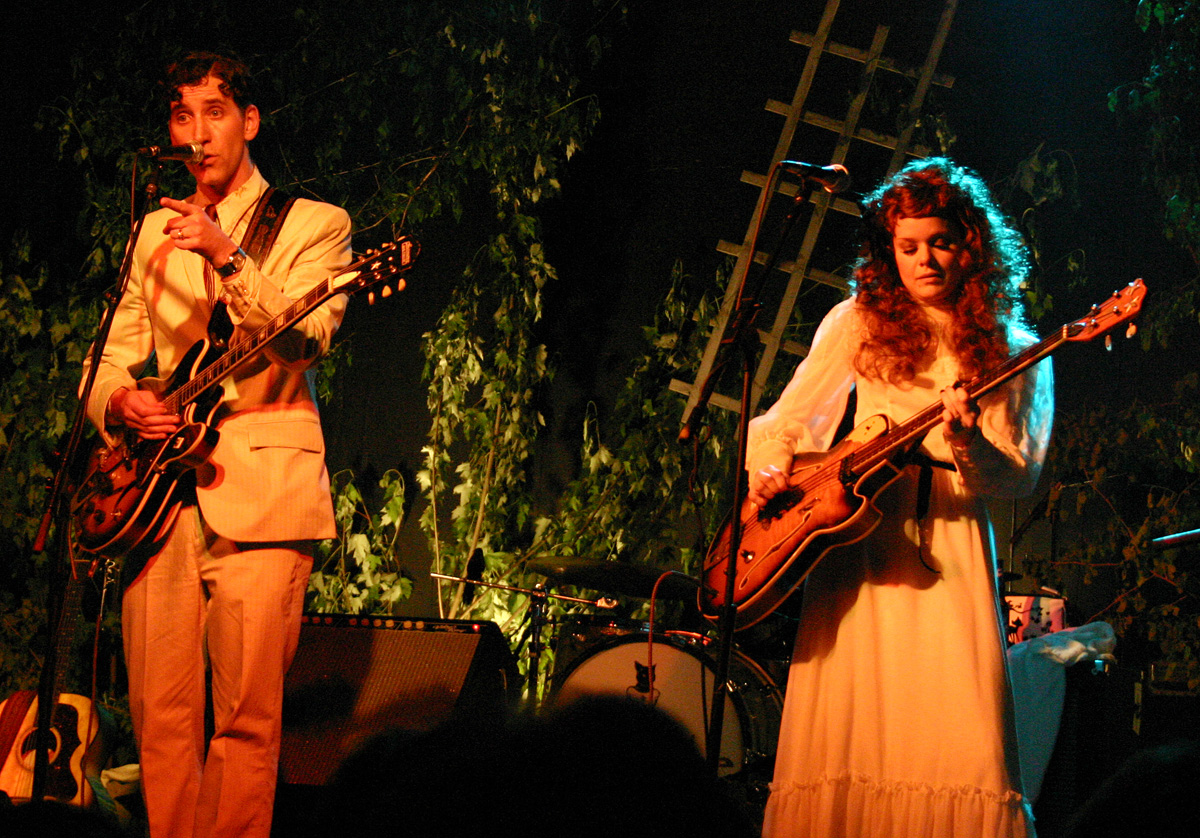
- Dan John Miller and Tracee Mae Miller

Background information
- Origin: Detroit, Michigan, USA
- Genres: Alternative country
- Years active: 2002–present
- Labels: Loose; V2 Records
- Members: Dan John Miller; Tracee Mae Miller; David Feeny "Little Jack" Lawrence; Lisa "Jaybird" Jannon
- Past members: Brian "Patch" Boyle
- Website: http://www.blanchemusic.com/

Blanche is an American alternative country band from Detroit, Michigan. Their music is based in Americana, early country, and folk blues, with a touch of haunting Southern Gothic stylings and garage rock mentality. Blanche is known for wearing vintage fashion of the early to mid-20th century.

The origins of Blanche can be traced back to the early '90s band Goober & the Peas. Led by Dan "Goober" Miller, the band was devoted to cowpunk, and dressed in honky-tonk attire. After the break-up of Goober & The Peas, three of the band's members—Dan Miller, Jack White, and Damian Lang—formed the garage rock band Two-Star Tabernacle with Miller's wife Tracee Mae Miller. The band split in 1999, after releasing one 7-inch vinyl with Andre Williams. White went on to form The White Stripes, Lang joined The Detroit Cobras, and Dan and Tracee Mae formed Blanche.

Since 2003, Blanche has performed at several international music festivals, including Lowlands, Pukkelpop and the CMJ Music Marathon. The band opened for and toured with The White Stripes, Loretta Lynn, Ditty Bops, The Flaming Lips, Wilco, Calexico, The Kills, and Brendan Benson, among others. Blanche has also appeared on several radio stations for live performances and interviews in the United States and Europe, including WFUV in New York and XFM in London.

== Members ==
- Dan John Miller - guitar, lead vocals
- Tracee Mae Miller - bass, vocals
- Lisa 'Jaybird' Jannon - drums, vocals
- "Little Jack" Lawrence - banjo, mandolin, vocals, keyboards
- David Feeny - pedal steel guitar, dobro, keyboards, clarinet, melodica, vocals, percussion

Former Members

- Brian "Patch" Boyle - banjo, autoharp

== Discography ==
=== Albums ===
- If We Can't Trust the Doctors (2004), V2 Records/Cass Records/Loose
- Little Amber Bottles (2007), Loose

=== EPs ===
- Demo EP (2003), self-released
- America's Newest Hitmakers (2004), Loose
- What This Town Needs (2006), V2 Records/Loose

=== Singles ===
- "Who's to Say/Superstition" 7" (2004), Cass Records

=== Other appearances ===
- "Never Again" (demo, Comes with a Smile No. 14, spring 2004)

== Other projects ==
In addition to Blanche, the band members have been involved in various other music and arts:

- In the 2005 biopic of Johnny Cash, Walk the Line, Dan Miller played the major supporting role of Luther Perkins, Cash's guitarist. Perkins' wife, Margie, was portrayed by Tracee Mae. Miller also appeared on the film's T-Bone Burnett-produced soundtrack.
- Tracee Mae Miller is an established painter, and also makes many of her own dresses. For a short time, she ran a popular eBay store, where she sold revamped vintage clothing.
- Feeny was in the '80s garage band The Hysteric Narcotics as well as the Orange Roughies, and is currently also in the band American Mars. Feeny was fortunate enough to play pedal steel guitar and engineer on the grammy award winning Loretta Lynn record 'Van Lear Rose'. He also runs Tempermill Studios.
- Little Jack Lawrence has been the long-time bassist for The Greenhornes, and has been known to play with both bands on the same night. He is also a member of Jack White's bands The Raconteurs and The Dead Weather. Lawrence's stand-ins for live performances with Blanche have included former member Patch Boyle, Detroit musicians Dean Fertita and Steve Nawara, and Goober & the Peas member Tom Hendrickson Jr.
- Lawrence, Miller, and Feeny briefly played in the Do-Whaters (along with the Greenhornes' drummer Patrick Keeler), the backing band for Loretta Lynn's 2004 album, Van Lear Rose. The album was produced by Jack White, who also led the band.
- Patch Boyle has drifted out of the music business, and is the co-founder of the Detroit web magazine Model D.
