= Hotel Yorba =

2001 single by the White Stripes

Single by the White Stripes

from the album White Blood Cells
- B-side: "Rated X"
- Released: November 12, 2001
- Recorded: May 2001
- Genre: Country; country blues; garage rock; country pop
- Length: 2:10
- Label: XL
- Composers: Jack White, Meg White
- Lyricist: Jack White
- Producer: Jack White

The White Stripes singles chronology
"Party of Special Things to Do" (2000)	"Hotel Yorba" (2001)	"Fell in Love with a Girl" (2002)

Music video
- "Hotel Yorba" on YouTube

"Hotel Yorba" is the lead single from White Blood Cells, by American garage rock band the White Stripes. A country song uncharacteristic of the band's punk and rock roots, it was released on November 12, 2001.

== Background ==
Built in 1926, the Hotel Yorba is a former hotel in southwest Detroit that can be seen along I-75 near the Ambassador Bridge to Canada. The single version of the song was recorded in room 206 of the building which is now used as government subsidized housing. Jack says that, as a child, he heard a rumor that the Beatles had stayed there—a rumor that, although false, he loved.

The song was used for a deleted scene in the 2002 movie 28 Days Later. The scene does not appear on the DVD, while the song itself is featured on the soundtrack CD released by XL Records.

== Release ==
"Hotel Yorba" was released as a single on November 12, 2001. The single was reissued on opaque red vinyl for Black Friday Record Store Day in 2012 by Third Man Records and later released on standard black vinyl.

== Music video ==
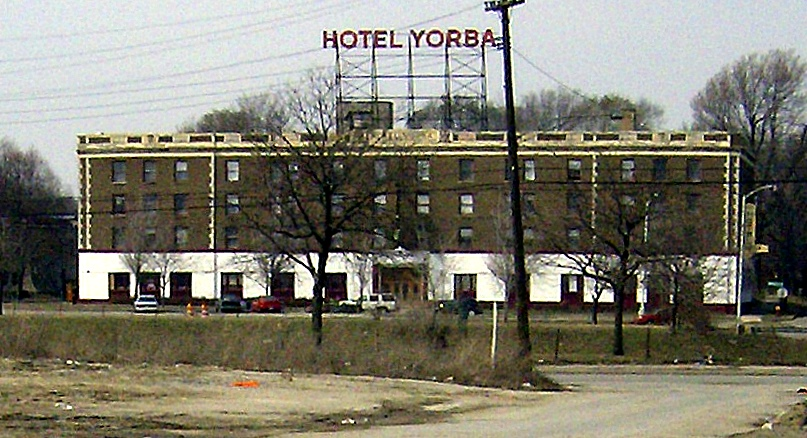
The Hotel Yorba from Fort Street

The White Stripes shot much of the song's music video outside the hotel, but were denied permission to film inside; it's rumored the duo is banned for life from the hotel.

The music video, directed by Dan John Miller and shot by longtime filmmaker/collaborator Kevin Carrico, combines footage of Meg and Jack playing inside what is presumed to be the Hotel Yorba, lounging on a porch in a city neighborhood, and being part of a wedding ceremony in a cathedral. Actress/model Tracee Mae Miller is featured in multiple scenes: when Jack marries her in a cathedral (actually Jack's childhood parish, where he played an altar boy to Donald Sutherland's character in The Rosary Murders; the two would later appear together in Cold Mountain), when they are sitting on the porch, and when they are walking through the woods (on Belle Isle). During the marriage ceremony, Meg is tied to Jack with a rope that links from his waist to hers. They are also tied together when Jack and Miller are walking through the woods and sitting on the local porch.

After a day of filming (until midnight), there was just enough film left in the camera to do an impromptu, one-take video for "We Are Going To Be Friends" in which Meg falls asleep and is awakened by Jack at the end.

== Reception ==
Paste and Stereogum ranked the song number seven and number four, respectively, on their lists of the greatest White Stripes songs.

== Track listing ==
7-inch
No.	Title	Length
1.	"Hotel Yorba" (Live)
2.	"Rated X" (Live) (Loretta Lynn cover)

CD
No.	Title	Length
1.	"Hotel Yorba"
2.	"Rated X" (Live)
3.	"Hotel Yorba" (Music video)
