= Goober & the Peas =

American cowpunk band

- Origin: Detroit, Michigan, U.S.
- Genres: Cowpunk, alternative country, garage rock
- Years active: 1990–1995; 2009–2011; 2014
- Labels: Detroit Municipal Recordings
- Members: Dan John Miller; Tom Hendrickson; Chris Hammond; Jim Currie; Mike Miller

Goober & The Peas is a cowpunk band from Detroit, Michigan, known for blending odd humor to a darker side of country music and indie rock, and for Jack White of The White Stripes having served as drummer for a period.

The band was known for their frenetic live shows in the early and mid-1990s. The Austin Chronicle called them "some seriously sick individuals, and quite possibly the most exciting live act in America" after their performance at South by Southwest in 1993. They performed with Nick Cave and the Bad Seeds, Bob Dylan, Red Hot Chili Peppers, Morphine and Uncle Tupelo. Their debut EP, The Complete Works of Goober & The Peas, was followed by an LP of the same name in 1992 and a follow-up LP, The Jet-Age Genius of Goober & the Peas, three years later. They also released a Christmas record and appeared on compilations.

== History ==
The band consisted of "Goober", (Dan John Miller, who eventually formed Two-Star Tabernacle and Blanche), "Junior" (Tom Hendrickson Jr.), "Shorty" (Jim Currie), "Boss Hoss" (the late Mike Miller, Dan John's brother), and "Doc" (Damian Lang). Towards the end of the band's original run, Jack White, the eventual founder of The White Stripes and subsequent popular rock bands, was brought on as a drummer. As this was in the period before the White Stripes, he performed under his birth name of John Gillis. His Pea nickname was "Doc".

The video for "Hot Women (Cold Beer)" played regularly on Video Juke Box, on Canada's "Much Music," and spent eight weeks on the College Music Journal (CMJ) video chart while the album simultaneously charted on the CMJ Top 200 college albums chart. The music video was Co-Directed by Dan John Miller and Marcy Hedy Lynn and shot by Cinematographer Scott Pelzel. The band also won Best Rock Band and Album of the Year honors at the 1992 Detroit Music Awards.

=== Return ===
In late November 2009, the band's name appeared on an initial list of performers for the 2010 SXSW music festival. In the ensuing 24 hours, "Goober" and "Junior" released a video on YouTube announcing the return of the band after a 15-year "retirement". The first scheduled concert of the reformed Goober & The Peas was on December 26, 2009 at St. Andrews Hall in Detroit and was a sold-out show. Their second Detroit show of the reunion was on July 17, 2010. Once again, it was at St. Andrews, and once again, it was sold out. They played at the Ferndale DIY Fest on September 17, 2010, and at a St. Baldricks kids with cancer charity event in Romeo, MI in March 2011. The band reunited again in July 2014 to perform at the inaugural Pig & Whiskey Festival in Ferndale, Michigan.

== Discography ==
=== Albums ===
- The Complete Works of Goober & the Peas (1992)
- A Christmas Eve Get-Together with Goober & the Peas (1992)
- The Jet-Age Genius of Goober & the Peas (1995)

== See also ==
Goober Peas
