= Cedars Union =

Non-profit arts organization in Dallas, Texas

The Cedars Union is a 501 (c) 3 non-profit arts organization located in the Cedars neighborhood of Dallas, TX. The Bowdon Family Foundation bought the Boedeker Building, the eventual property for The Cedars Union, in 2014.

== Locations ==
=== The Cedars Union Annex ===
The Cedars Union is currently housed in the Cedars Union Annex building adjacent to The Boedeker Building. Spanning 7,000 sq. feet, the arts incubator houses micro-studios, a Mac lab, a PC lab, a wood shop, a 3D printer, and other tools for artists.

==== Studio Artists Cohort 2 ====
- Brantly Sheffield
- Carolyn Sortor
- Catherine Cornelius
- Elizabeth Hill
- James Talambas
- Jessica Baldivieso
- Jessica Hilvitz
- Kathryn Vestal
- Kristin Moore
- Lisa Horlander
- Lori Maclean
- Mari Pohlman
- Michelle Hinojosa
- Rachel Walter

==== Studio Artists Cohort 3 ====
- Taylor Cleveland
- Laura Davidson
- Angel Faz
- Carlin Flores
- Tiara Unique Francois
- Beronica Gonzales
- Maria Haag
- Rachael Henson
- Tina Medina
- Claire Moore
- JD Moore
- Grace Nicole
- Hannah Rotwein
- P. Seth Thompson
- Ashley Whitt
- Matthew "Woody" Wood
- Phallon Wright

=== The Boedeker Building ===
The Cedars Union plans to eventually expand into the Boedeker Building, originally an ice cream plant. The Boedeker Building is sometimes used to host events such as Art Conspiracy and SOLUNA. Their May 2018 collaboration with SOLUNA featured interdisciplinary artist and former professional figure skater Jennifer Wester in her piece titled Breaking Shadows. In 2020, Erika Jaeggli's exhibition, Flesh & Bone, garnered the Cedars Union a TACA pop-up grant. The Cedars Union hosted their All-Members Show, Fooling Ourselves, in the Boedeker in 2022. The show consisted of eleven site-specific works by artists: Taylor Cleveland, Laura Davidson, Beronica Gonzales, Gemma Guiomard, Maria Haag, Taylor Hinchliffe, Lisa Horlander, Cat Rigdon, Hannah Rotwein, and Phallon Wright.
