= The Vice and Virtue Ministry =

Studio album by The Happy Bullets
- Released: 2005
- Recorded: June 2004 – January 2005 at Valve Studios, BPL, That Room Near BPL, and Stuart's Studio
- Genre: Indie pop
- Length: 39:03
- Label: Undeniable Records
- Producer: The Happy Bullets, Stuart Sikes

The Happy Bullets chronology
Blue Skies and Umbrellas (2004)	The Vice and Virtue Ministry (2005)

Professional ratings
Review scores
Source	Rating
Allmusic	link

The Vice and Virtue Ministry is the second album by The Happy Bullets. The album's name is a fictional British prep school that spoofs the name of a former Taliban governmental department, the Vice and Virtue Ministry.

== Track listing ==
All tracks written by Jason Roberts and Tim Ruble

1. Learning to Love the Factory – 3:13
2. The Vice and Virtue Ministry – 3:28
3. Drinkin' on the Job – 3:34
4. Mr. Gray – 3:31
5. The Disquieting Letter – 2:33
6. If You Were Mine – 2:59
7. A Momentary Vision of the End of the World as Seen Through the Eyes of a Suburban Housewife – 4:17
8. A Proper Rifle Assembly – 4:15
9. Don't Wait Up – 3:29
10. Weights and Measures – 3:19
11. Sex and Valium – 1:54
12. Good Day! – 2:31
