= White Blood Cells =

Studio album by the White Stripes
- Released: July 3, 2001
- Recorded: February 2001
- Studio: Easley McCain Recording (Memphis, Tennessee)
- Genres: Garage rock; alternative rock; indie rock
- Length: 40:25
- Labels: Sympathy for the Record Industry; V2
- Producer: Jack White

The White Stripes chronology
De Stijl (2000)	White Blood Cells (2001)	Elephant (2003)

Singles from White Blood Cells
- 1. "Hotel Yorba" Released: November 12, 2001; 2. "Fell in Love with a Girl" Released: January 21, 2002; 3. "Dead Leaves and the Dirty Ground" Released: July 1, 2002

White Blood Cells is the third studio album by American rock duo the White Stripes. It was released by Sympathy for the Record Industry on July 3, 2001 and reissued by V2 Records in 2002. Produced by guitarist and lead vocalist Jack White, the album was recorded at Easley-McCain Recording in Tennessee over three days and was their first work to be mastered in a studio. The process cost $5,000 and was rushed in order to capture a "real tense feeling" and the band's raw energy.

Following their success within the Detroit music scene, the White Stripes began to shift from their blues-inspired roots to a garage rock sound. The album contains lyrics about love, hope, betrayal, and paranoia, while its name and cover art reference the band's disillusionment with fame and the mainstream music industry. For promotion, they played a trio of shows in Detroit and released "Hotel Yorba", "Fell in Love with a Girl", and "Dead Leaves and the Dirty Ground" as singles.

White Blood Cells charted in nine countries, reaching number 61 on the US Billboard 200 and number 55 on the UK Albums Chart, and earned platinum certifications in both countries. The album received widespread acclaim and propelled Jack and Meg White to the forefront of the 2000s indie and garage rock movements. Since its release, it has been ranked by several critics among the best albums of all time.

== Background and recording ==
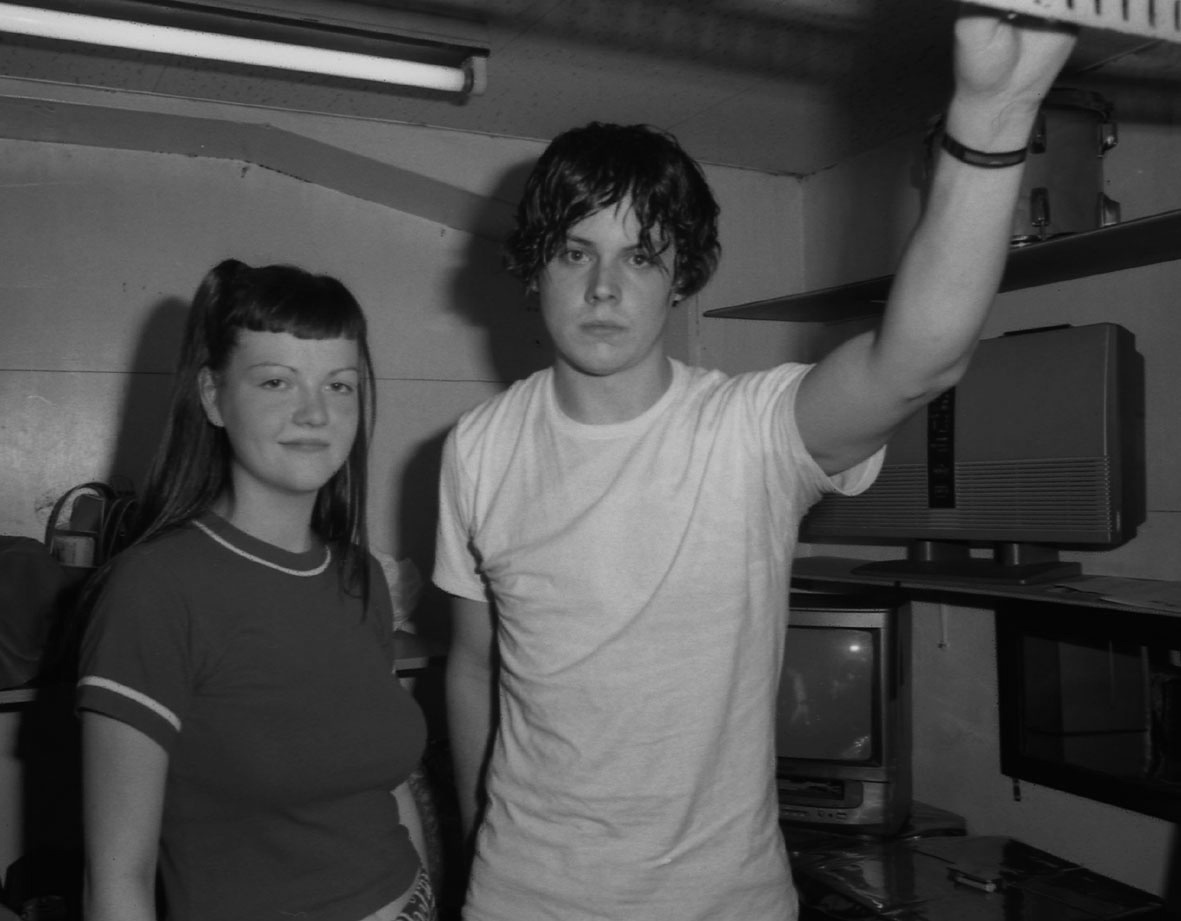
The White Stripes backstage at Club Shinjuku Jam, Tokyo, in 2000

"The blues is my number-one love. I love it to death, yet I’m white. I wasn’t born in 1910. When we’re playing it I feel bad at the same time as loving it. It’s difficult for me to think about. It makes me uncomfortable. That’s why the new album is called White Blood Cells, and there’s no blues on the album."

— Jack on this album's departure from their blues style.

The White Stripes previously sought success in the Detroit music scene, releasing two albums between 1999 and 2000. In the interim, bandmates Jack and Meg White divorced; however Meg insisted that they continue working together. They had still been living in the house purchased from Jack's parents and lived within their means, having had no inkling of the mainstream success that would greet them with this album. With De Stijl (2000), they were content to tour modestly, come home, and go back to their respective normal day jobs as the word "success" meant no longer having to work one. That goal became a reality with the tour: Jack closed his upholstery studio and Meg eventually left her restaurant job. Paradoxically, Meg kept her uniforms out of the superstitious belief that throwing them away would bring such bad luck that it would lead her back to working a day job.

Prior to White Blood Cells, the White Stripes had no interest in working with a major label for fear of losing artistic freedom and the horror stories associated with the mainstream music industry. However, the band would leave Sympathy for the Record Industry that year due to the lack of stewardship of its business and sign with V2 Records in November 2001. They were specifically aggravated that among other reasons: fans struggled to find their records, supply was not keeping up with demand, and that it was difficult for their music to be sold internationally–though they never imagined the possibility of going platinum. Before the album's release and signing with V2, Jack did not want to participate in the "business" side of the industry and believed he should only be a performer. Meg said they wanted a larger record label to address their distribution issues, though they did not actively seek any out. She expressed a similar opinion that major labels were focused on "making money", having a sense of control, and that their ideals were seemingly incompatible with that of the artist. Major labels began pursuing the White Stripes after a Rolling Stone reporter featured them on a list of artists to watch and months later, British DJ John Peel featured them live on his radio show.

Operating under the assumption that no major label was genuinely interested in their music and not wanting to recoup an advance, they rejected generous offers; this in turn led to a bidding war, which gave them the leverage to ask for "impossible" contract stipulations they believed no label would accept. In hindsight, it was a "stupid" decision to turn down those generous offers, as they were "broke", acting "spoiled", and would have enthusiastically delivered albums under their contract. Ian Montone, an attorney who had recently switched to entertainment law, met Jack through Sub Pop's A&R as the band were not being paid royalties and considering leaving their label. Montone guided Jack through the process of establishing Third Man Records in order to create a licensing agreement with a major label; the imprint was otherwise not a physical business at the time but rather "protective insurance." In the meantime, Montone became a talent manager with the White Stripes as his first client. After signing with V2, Jack soon realized the band's apprehensions toward major labels were completely inaccurate and went as far as to say he would never let his own child sign to an independent label if they became a musician. In their view, they had been ripped off by independent labels that did not abide by (or have knowledge of) copyright law, and in Meg's words, they had "learned when to trust–and when not to." Seeing that some of their favorite artists, from Captain Beefheart to the Ramones, Sex Pistols, and the Rolling Stones, had been signed to major labels and appeared on popular television shows also changed their opinion when they gained mainstream success themselves.

Before production, the White Stripes originally envisioned for White Blood Cells to be a double album. With the title already in mind as of December 2000, Jack thought of recording the first disc in studio and the other disc at home, with a plethora of country and piano-based songs he had written. Disenchanted with the media's "bringing-back-the-blues" label placed on the band after De Stijl, Jack sought for them to do an album focused on songwriting and purposely kept blues music off the album.

Following De Stijl, which was recorded in the living room of their Detroit home with Jack as its producer and engineer, (Note: Jack produced, engineered, and mixed that album by himself but went to Jim Diamond's Ghetto Recorders studio to mix it further.) they decided to leave town to record White Blood Cells, after finding that recording the previous album at home was a "bad idea" and that they work better with one other person. Jack later explained that his diplomatic nature led him to prefer working that way, for better or worse, allowing him to communicate his musical vision without undesired conflict.

After rehearsing for a week, the White Stripes recorded White Blood Cells over three days, in 12- to 13-hour shifts, in February 2001, at Easley McCain Recording in Memphis, Tennessee. Having never been there, Jack and Meg felt "Memphis was exactly like Detroit. [...] It was a good thing." Jack elaborated that Memphis was "a lot more connected to reality. It's not the harsh reality of Detroit, it doesn't have the urban decay that was in a lot of our songs in the past," and Tennessee in general felt "so much [like] home." Memphis was compared to "finding an old, historic amp with a precise sound" and chosen over recording in New York City or Los Angeles because of the city's history of the record labels Stax Records and Sun Records. The studio was chosen in part by the suggestion of Jack Yarber, of the band the Oblivians, as well as '68 Comeback's Jeffrey Evans. It was the band's first time recording, mixing and mastering their music in a 24-track recording studio, and Jack asked recording engineer Stuart Sikes more than once "not to make it sound too good."

Jack recorded his vocals next to Meg as she played the drums to replicate the live performance dynamic, as the studio was too large to record them separately. According to Sikes, in order to save money, the first 12 tracks of the tape were used until they were filled, the machine was backed up to the beginning to use the remaining 12 tracks. Meg was initially hesitant about rushing the recording process, believing the songs were "too new" and required more practice. Rushing the record, however, was done in order to keep the album "as unorganized as possible" and get "a real tense feeling." The band utilized the most amount of limitations placed upon themselves for any album they had ever done. The production of the album cost about $5,000.

Three weeks before the album was released, TIME published an article revealing nationally that Jack White and Meg White had divorced in 2000, as well as providing more accurate biographical details to its readers. Jack was irate and said that he "hated" the reporter, whom he had already met, and would have physically confronted him. Meg later said "it didn't really get [her] angry."

== Music and lyrics ==
=== Composition and sound ===
Continuing the stripped-down garage rock nature of the White Stripes, White Blood Cells features less of the band's blues rock influences, instead displaying a more raw, basic, and primitive rock and roll sound. Shortly before the release of White Blood Cells, Jack asserted that "There's no blues on the new record. We're taking a break from that. There's no slide work, bass, guitar solos, or cover songs. It's just me and Meg, guitar, drums and piano." It is one of two White Stripes albums to not feature any covers of other artists.

The lyrics in White Blood Cells explore love, hope, betrayal, and paranoia, brought on by the increasing media attention the duo began receiving. Most if not all of the songs were written in the band's early years, or inspired by other side-projects of Jack. Jack said being able to utilize his older works was "cool because a lot of things had been sitting around for a long time, stuff I had written on piano that had been just sitting around not doing anything. And it was good to put them all together at once, put them all in the same box and see what happened." Many songs that ended up on the album were originally written by Jack for his former band Two-Star Tabernacle. These include "Dead Leaves and the Dirty Ground", "Hotel Yorba", "The Union Forever", "The Same Boy You've Always Known", "Offend in Every Way", and "Now Mary".

=== Songs 1–8 ===
"There’s one song I wrote called "The Same Boy You’ve Always Known", though I don't really know if that song's really about me. It did feel at the time that at least that sentence was about me: "I'm the same boy you’ve always known." It sort of encapsulates the idea as an artists of always trying to paint like a child paints, always remove yourself from your environment and get back down to the reality of who you really might be inside. And how some of us never really feel like we've grown up. A lot of us feel like we're these boys and girls trapped in adult bodies. So that might be a good one to play [at my memorial]."

— Jack on the significance of "The Same Boy You've Always Known"

"Dead Leaves and the Dirty Ground", the first of multiple former Two-Star Tabernacle songs to be adapted by the White Stripes, was first performed by the White Stripes on a local radio show in early 1999. It was recorded for their debut album, but Jack didn't feel it was ready until the production of White Blood Cells. According to Jack, although the song was his idea, the "structure", "soul", and "White Stripes feeling" of the song came from Meg's drumming. The music video was filmed in London, England and directed by Michel Gondry with numerous takes to crosscut and superimpose the wreckage of the Whites' fictional home. "Hotel Yorba" is based on the former hotel of the same name, which was a couple of blocks from Jack's childhood home. It was inspired by a rumor Jack had loved about The Beatles staying there. It was recorded at the hotel but the duo were quickly banned from the premises. Its B-side contained a live cover of 1972's country hit "Rated "X"" by Loretta Lynn.

Critics perceived "I'm Finding It Harder to be a Gentleman" to be about the dissolution of the romantic relationship between Jack and Meg, who divorced over a year before the release of the album. They also perceived Jack as lyrically embodying the archaic gender roles of men in the 1930s Deep South, though Jack insisted he disagreed with their depraved behavior and does not identify as a conservative person or Republican at all, saying it was just "throwing an idea to see what the reaction is," and an attempt to "shock people." In an interview with NME, Jack said among other things that the song was about how women expect him to live up to certain standards in relationships that they wouldn't hold themselves to, though Meg insinuated that she was ambivalent toward the lyrics, saying "I don't know about that one," when asked.

"Fell in Love With a Girl"
"Fell in Love With a Girl" references an intense crush and feelings of love.

"Fell in Love with a Girl", the album's second single, became the band's breakthrough to the mainstream, aided by its Lego-animation music video, directed and conceptualized by Gondry. The director was chosen because someone told Jack that Gondry directed "Devils Haircut" by Beck when in reality it was director Mark Romanek, whom they could not afford. Gondry was inspired by the album cover art for Three Imaginary Boys (1979) by The Cure as well as The White Stripes' imagery of red, white, and black of which reminded him of Legos. Fifteen animators took six weeks to create the video. The song was compared to the work of the English punk rock band Buzzcocks as well as Surfer Rosa-era Pixies. Because of its brief length, just under two minutes, the song was not initially expected to be played on the radio.

"Expecting" depicts a relationship in which a woman is never satisfied with him and expects more and more of him. It makes a tongue-in-cheek reference to Toledo, Ohio, about an hour away from Detroit, in which the narrator is sent against his will. The song concludes with Meg seemingly asking a favor. Billboard considered it a "colossal rocker" and standout guitar track on the album in its review. "Little Room" has been described as an "homily", written in response to Jack's favorite song, "Grinnin' in Your Face" by Son House. It is the third of the six songs in the White Stripes discography to feature the word "little" in its title.

The White Stripes didn't start performing "The Union Forever" until Meg's nascent drumming skills began to develop. It contains allusions to Citizen Kane (1941), Jack's favorite film, and nearly every line in the song comes from the movie; Warner Bros. was once rumored to be suing the band over copyright infringement for Citizen Kane. "The Same Boy You've Always Known" is a rock ballad. In an interview with broadcast journalist Dan Rather, Jack chose the song as the one that he'd like to be played at his memorial. The song was most likely written between late 1998 and early 1999, during the "Living Room Sessions" hobby that occurred at a local venue that Jack went to weekly. It was first performed in April 1999.

=== Songs 9–16 ===
"We're Going to Be Friends" is about two innocent children who befriend each other on the first day of school and makes an allusion to "Suzy Lee" from their first album. (Note: Suzy Lee is a fictional character.) Although it is not a blues song, Jack said writing about themes of childhood was his way of contributing to the blues tradition. The lyric of "Tonight I'll dream, while I’m in bed / When silly thoughts go through my head" was inspired by a Paul McCartney interview in which he talked about writing "Yellow Submarine"; the song itself was partly inspired by "Thirteen" by Big Star and written on his girlfriend's bed. In 2020, Jack said he did not recall at that point what made him write the song; however in contemporary interviews, he frequently mentioned that it was driven by his desire to have had friends as a young child, and later said Meg was his only friend at all until they became performers. It's Jack's favorite White Stripes song. It was the first White Stripes song to be used in film, (Note: "Hotel Yorba" was going to be used in 28 Days Later (2002), although the scene was ultimately cut from the theatrical version of the film.) appearing in Napoleon Dynamite (2004). Jack allowed the song to be used in Napoleon Dynamite because "it reminded [him] of [his] school years." Though only released as a promotional recording in 2002, it became one of the band's most popular songs and has been compared to the work of the Beatles. The music video was recorded in one take after the filming of the "Hotel Yorba" music video earlier in the day, as Kevin Carrico (who was also the director of photography on the "Hotel Yorba" music video) had some extra film available. It depicts Jack playing the song while Meg, whose drums are not featured on the song, (Note: The tapping heard on the song is a cardboard box, like that of the "Hotel Yorba" music video or simply tapping her foot. An alternate take was recorded with drums but not used.) sleeps on a couch that they had planned to discard. It was the last song they ever performed live in 2009.

Two consecutive tracks described by Stylus Magazine's Andrew Unterberger as engaging filler, "I Think I Smell a Rat" was built upon another, unreleased song called "That's Where It's At", also recorded during the sessions. "Aluminum" is a heavy metal instrumental that features Jack and Meg screaming wordlessly over a sludgey guitar riff inspired by early Nirvana. "Offend in Every Way", "This Protector", "Now Mary", and "I Can Learn" were all written before their debut record. Jack considers "Now Mary" to be one of The White Stripes' country songs. The White Stripes expressed regret over putting "I Can't Wait" on the album as the final product did not meet their expectations.

== Artwork and packaging ==
The name White Blood Cells was chosen as "this idea of bacteria coming at us, or just foreign things coming at us, or media, or attention on the band." Its cover art was photographed on a wall by the former Tiger Stadium. It depicts Jack and Meg surrounded by people wielding television and video cameras, which was intended to both comment on and satirize the music industry. The people portraying the silhouetted figures were The White Stripes' now-former friends in The Von Bondies and The Waxwings. Jack said in a 2001 interview before the album's release: "When does music become a business and why do we have to be suckered into it? Why do we have to buy a cell phone, you know what I mean? A lot of that stuff upsets me. It gets annoying." In 2003, he elaborated that not being perpetually accessible to their manager via cell phone was his way of maintaining his own sanity. Its cover art was only meant to comment on the success they gained outside of the Detroit rock scene, and why they themselves achieved it rather than contemporaries like Rocket 455 and The Greenhornes, but it became an "accidental prophetic thing" with the breakthrough success of the album.

The album was dedicated to Loretta Lynn, (Note: When Jack and Meg were on their way home from Memphis, they passed by Lynn's ranch. Meg was smoking a cigarette and put it out in Lynn's driveway. Jack thought this was inconsiderate so they decided to dedicate the album to Lynn to make up for it.) whom Jack dreamed of the opportunity to meet. Over a year later, her daughter Patsy Lynn became aware of the dedication and alerted her about it, creating a friendship between Lynn and the band. After Lynn invited the White Stripes to her home and brought up making another album, Jack volunteered to produce it. The album became Van Lear Rose (2004).

== Reception ==
Professional ratings
Aggregate scores
Source	Rating
Metacritic	86/100
Review scores
Source	Rating
AllMusic	5/5 stars
Alternative Press	8/10
Los Angeles Times	3.5/4 stars
NME	8/10
Pitchfork	9.0/10
Q	4/5 stars
Rolling Stone	3.5/4 stars
The Rolling Stone Album Guide	4.5/5 stars
Uncut	4/5 stars
The Village Voice	A

Three weeks before the release of the album, the White Stripes performed three well-received shows in Detroit at the Gold Dollar, the Magic Bag, and the Magic Stick. Twice released on July 3, 2001 by Sympathy and in 2002 by V2, White Blood Cells was the band's first mainstream success. The album entered the UK Albums Chart on August 18, 2001, peaking at 55 and spending 39 weeks on the chart. It debuted on the Billboard 200 at 185 on March 23, 2002, remaining on the charts for 53 weeks and peaking at 61 on April 20, 2002. It went on to receive platinum certifications in the United Kingdom and the United States, and gold certifications in Australia and Canada.

White Blood Cells received widespread acclaim. Review aggregating website Metacritic reports a normalized score of 86 out of 100 based on 16 reviews, indicating "universal acclaim". This makes White Blood Cells the White Stripes' second highest-scoring album on the website as of 2024. It drew praise in the United Kingdom on its initial release, and after its reissue by V2, was acclaimed in the United States; outlets of both territories praised the band's "back to basics" approach. As observed by AllMusic editor Heather Phares, "Jack and Meg White's third effort for Sympathy for the Record Industry wraps their powerful, deceptively simple style around meditations on fame, love, and betrayal... it's precisely this mix of strength and sweetness, among other contrasts, that makes the White Stripes so intriguing. Likewise, White Blood Cells' ability to surprise old fans and win over new ones makes it one of the Stripes' finest albums."

Writers at NME said "This is the house of the Rising Stars: the lyrics are great, the attitude unmistakable. [...] Great songs, a great look and self-discipline, too. Rock'n'roll might have been the ruin of many a poor boy, but White Stripes are made guys." Dan Killan and Ryan Schreiber of Pitchfork said that "Jack and Meg White summon the Holy Spirit and channel it through 16 perfectly concise songs of longing, with dirty, distorted electric guitar cranked to maximum amplification, crashing, bruised drums, and little else. They don't innovate rock; they embody it." Rolling Stone said that, on White Blood Cells, "Jack's Delta-roadhouse fantasies, Detroit-garage-rock razzle and busted-love lyricism, as well as Meg's toy-thunder drumming all peaked at once." Joe Hagan of The New York Times declared that the White Stripes "have made rock rock again by returning to its origins as a simple, primitive sound full of unfettered zeal."

White Blood Cells was included on many "best of 2001" year-end lists, including Blender, Rolling Stone, Mojo, and Kerrang!'s top 20, and NME, Pitchfork, and The Village Voice's top 10. It also earned the band their first accolades, including three awards at the 2002 MTV Video Music Awards and nominations at the 2002 MTV Europe Music Awards, the 2002 MuchMusic Video Awards, and the 2002 Shockwaves NME Awards.

By July 2001, British radio DJ John Peel had been regularly playing and promoting The White Stripes' music on his radio show for over a year, unbeknownst to the band. Jack and Peel quickly bonded over their shared taste in music, particularly Captain Beefheart, (Note: While Jack was in The Go, one of his bandmates introduced him to the music of Captain Beefheart via a BBC documentary that Peel narrated called The Artist Formerly Known as Captain Beefheart (1997).) Gene Vincent, Lonnie Donegan, and the blues, as well as Jack's pastime of mingling with older intellectuals. Peel rarely had live-in-studio performances on his radio show, which piqued the attention of the British media. Within mere weeks the British press–particularly NME–began to catch on to the band and turned into a barrage of British media coverage that even NME itself described as "apocolyptic."

The White Stripes were nonplussed by the mainstream response to White Blood Cells, being that it was their third album and their core audience had been relatively small, abeit "fickle." Seeing The Strokes gain commensurate success and media attention in the United Kingdom from just their 2001 debut album "scared" them due to the level of "pressure." The White Stripes tried asking NME not to put them on the cover at all (the magazine instead used a candid, concert photo), fearing that the hype would immediately backfire and "two months later everyone would hate us," according to Meg. She also deduced that mainstream media would not understand that her style was heavily inspired by unorthodox drummer Peggy O'Neill, of avant-garde underground Detroit band The Gories, who played on a completely deconstructed drum set (made of only two toms, no snare, no cymbals, and no skin in the bass drum).

While recording White Blood Cells, the band listened to the soundtrack of the film O Brother, Where Art Thou? (2000), produced by T Bone Burnett, and Jack fantasized about the White Stripes performing on the soundtrack of a similar film. Due to the success of White Blood Cells, in 2002, Jack was cast in the film Cold Mountain (2003) at the suggestion of Burnett and performed five songs on its soundtrack, writing one original (Note: "Never Far Away" is the only true original on the soundtrack, whereas he is also credited for "Christmas Time Will Soon Be Over" but that is a traditional song whose writer is unknown.) ("Never Far Away") that was not included in the film, to his dismay. The soundtrack's sixth track, "Sitting on Top of the World" (written by Walter Vinson and Lonnie Chatmon of Mississippi Sheiks) was also the first blues song Jack ever learned to play in Howlin' Wolf's rendition, for which he felt was a "huge calling" that he was meant to play the role of Georgia in the film. Jack's audition song and the soundtrack's first track, "The Wayfaring Stranger", was also a song he performed with Two-Star Tarbernacle. Filming occurred in Romania, where Meg traveled for the White Stripes to perform an impromptu concert at a hotel in Brașov with Burnett and local performers; among others, they played "Fell in Love with a Girl", "I Think I Smell a Rat", "You're Pretty Good Looking (For a Girl)", "Dead Leaves and the Dirty Ground", "Hotel Yorba", "Jolene", "Isis" and "One More Cup of Coffee" (the latter two by Bob Dylan) which was the "high point of the film" experience for Jack as Burnett had originally performed them with Dylan on the Rolling Thunder Revue tour in the mid-1970s. He otherwise found the filming and recording experience overwhelming. Jack brought his guitar to Romania believing he would write the next albums for the White Stripes in his downtime, but after "a lot of days just stuck in a hotel room, freezing cold" he ultimately didn't have any inspiration to write at all. Nevertheless, the project was "worth every minute of it."

== White Blood Cells tour ==
The tour for White Blood Cells on June 1, 2001, at The Ohio State University in Columbus, Ohio, and continued south to Newport, Kentucky, before returning to Metro Detroit for multiple shows. They then went to the West Coast to perform in Olympia, Washington before returning to the Midwest to perform in Pittsburgh, Pennsylvania. They then went to New York City to perform at Bowery Ballroom and Mercury Lounge. They continued south to Philadelphia, Pennsylvania then returned north to New England to perform in Providence, Rhode Island and Cambridge, Massachusetts. They returned south to Washington, D.C. and Baltimore, Maryland, respectively; then returned again to the Midwest two weeks later to perform in Chicago, Illinois and Minneapolis, Minnesota; before heading west to Missoula, Montana. During this show, which happened to be Jack's 26th birthday, Jack was stochastically shocked by the microphone which the bar owner did not want to address. This led to a squabble and the show ended abruptly. They returned to Washington to perform in Seattle, where Meg remarked that their breakthrough was "a little overwhelming" and that "[she] never expected things to go this well." They continued down the West Coast to Portland, Oregon; Eureka, California; San Francisco, California; West Hollywood, California; and San Diego, California before going northeast to Denver, Colorado. A week later, the day before their concert the next day at the 100 Club in London, the White Stripes played their first ever British performance on Peel's radio show at Maida Vale Studios on July 25, 2001. Jack considers the first Peel Session as "one of the most amazing performances [they've] ever done," and included a Gene Vincent cover in the set to Peel's delight. They performed at the 100 Club in London, England, supported by the Masonics, where they were propelled into the national spotlight in the United Kingdom. In England, they continued to Brighton; Bristol; Oxford; and returned to London, before heading north to Nottingham; Manchester; Leeds; and Glasgow, Scotland.

After returning to the United States, they performed in Cleveland, Ohio; Buffalo, New York; Rochester, New York; Hudson River Park in New York City; and headed north to Hanover, New Hampshire. The next month, they performed in Bloomington, Indiana; Louisville, Kentucky; Columbia, Missouri and St. Louis, Missouri; they headed east to Nashville, Tennessee and Memphis, Tennessee then south to Fayetteville, Arkansas in a concert that occurred on September 11, 2001, though the band had still been in Memphis earlier that morning when the news of the terrorist attack occurred. Next they went west to Oklahoma City, Oklahoma; south to Dallas, Houston, and Austin, Texas; east to New Orleans; southeast to Tallahassee, Florida; north to Atlanta and Athens, Georgia; then north to Carrboro, North Carolina and Asheville, North Carolina. During the show in New Orleans, Jack noticed Ray Davies of the Kinks was in attendance, which enthralled him, though the show was otherwise mired by technical difficulties. A month later, they returned to Buffalo, New York. In early November 2001, they performed at the Detroit Institute of Arts. The next week they returned to England. A few days before their second Peel Session, the White Stripes visited Toe Rag Studios in Hackney, whose owner was the Masonics' guitarist Liam Watson, to record three songs that would become tracks 7, 11, and 14 on their next album, Elephant (2003). The mainstream success of White Blood Cells delayed Elephant for a year after its completion in 2002. The White Stripes returned to perform for Peel again, during his weekly broadcast from home in the English countryside. It was one of their first international cultural experiences. The next day they performed in Paris, France then later returned to perform in Brighton, England before performing in Hackney and Liverpool, England.

They then headed east, returning to Manchester, before returning to Scotland to perform in Glasgow and Edinburgh. They headed south to Sheffield, England; Wolverhampton, England; and returned to Bristol and London, respectively. They then went to Groningen, Netherlands then Cologne, Hamburg, Berlin, and Munich, Germany, respectively. They went to Milan, Italy; Montpellier and Ramonville-Saint-Agne, France, respectively, before going to Barcelona, Spain. They returned to France to perform in Clermont-Ferrand. They then went to Brussels, Belgium before returning to the Netherlands to perform in Amsterdam, then returned to London, England.

A month later, in January 2002, they headed across the world to Hamilton, New Zealand and Auckland, New Zealand, respectively. In the latter city, they also performed at the Big Day Out festival. They then went to tour Australia, performing at the Big Day Out festival in Gold Coast, Queensland; before continuing south to Byron Bay in the state of New South Wales, where they performed multiple shows in Sydney. (In Sydney and Melbourne, Victoria they continued performing at Big Day Out festivals.) While in Melbourne, they performed at the Corner Hotel venue where Jack created the riff of what would become "Seven Nation Army". After more shows in Melbourne, they continued to Adelaide, South Australia and Perth, Western Australia for their last Big Day Out appearances in that segment of the tour. Later that month, they returned to London, England; returned to the Netherlands to perform in Utrecht and Rotterdam respectively; then returned to France to tour Lille, Nantes, Bordeaux, Paris, and Strasbourg. They returned to Germany to perform in Schorndorf; Nuremberg; Dortmund; and Hamburg once again. They then went to Sweden to perform in Stockholm and Malmö. Meg later said they particularly like Malmö. Continuing in Scandinavia, they went to Bergen, Norway; Helsinki, Finland; and Oslo, Norway. They returned to the United States to perform on The Late Show with David Letterman, after being previously being bumped nine times to accommodate more famous bands such as U2. They then returned to Edinburgh, Scotland before returning to the United States again, to perform once again in Cleveland, Ohio; Pittsbugh and Philadelphia, Pennsylvania. The next day they performed at the 9:30 Club in Washington, D.C. and headed north to Towson, Maryland and Boston, Massachusetts. After heading south to perform once again Providence, Rhode Island, they performed four shows at New York City's Bowery Ballroom. They continued south to Old Bridge Township, New Jersey and west to Morgantown, West Virginia. They then returned to their home state to perform in East Lansing, Michigan.

The next month, they returned to London, England to perform at Shepherd's Bush Empire before heading to Dublin, Ireland. They once again returned to their home state to perform in Royal Oak, Michigan. They headed southwest across the country to perform in Tucson, Arizona and Mesa, Arizona. Then west to San Diego; Los Angeles; Pomona; back to Los Angeles; north to San Francisco and once again to Los Angeles. Returning to the Pacific Northwest, they performed once again in Portland, Oregon and Seattle, Washington before going further north to Vancouver, British Columbia and returning to Olympia, Washington. They returned to Denver, Colorado before going to Toronto, Ontario almost two weeks later. The next week, they performed at the Rock Werchter festival in Werchter, Belgium then performed at the Glastonbury festival in the United Kingdom. Continuing their festival streak, they performed at Roskilde Festival in Roskilde, Denmark and Quart Festival in Kristiansand, Norway.

After returning to the United States, they performed in Indianapolis, Indiana; St. Louis, Chicago, and Minneapolis again, respectively; then continued east to Milwaukee, Wisconsin. Two weeks later, they went to perform at a festival in Yuzawa Japan. They returned to the United States to perform in Pontiac, Michigan and Detroit, then returned to New York City for concerts at Irving Plaza and Radio City Music Hall. The British festivals in of Reading, Leeds, and Glasgow ended the summer segment of the tour.

On October 1, 2002, a Tuesday afternoon, the White Stripes performed at Union Square in a free concert promoted by Japanese car brand Nissan. The concert was announced on the radio the day before. Approximately 9,000 fans attended and spectators watched from windows in surrounding buildings. The band opened the show with "The Big Three Killed My Baby" and closed it with an a cappella version of "Boll Weevil" after the NYPD shut the power after they performed over their allotted time. Toronto and Columbus, Ohio (this time at Nationwide Arena) respectively ended the tour in mid-to-late October 2002. The day before the end of the tour, they also appeared on Saturday Night Live when Senator John McCain (R-AZ) hosted the episode, as coincidentally, McCain's daughter happened to be V2's publicist.

== Legacy ==
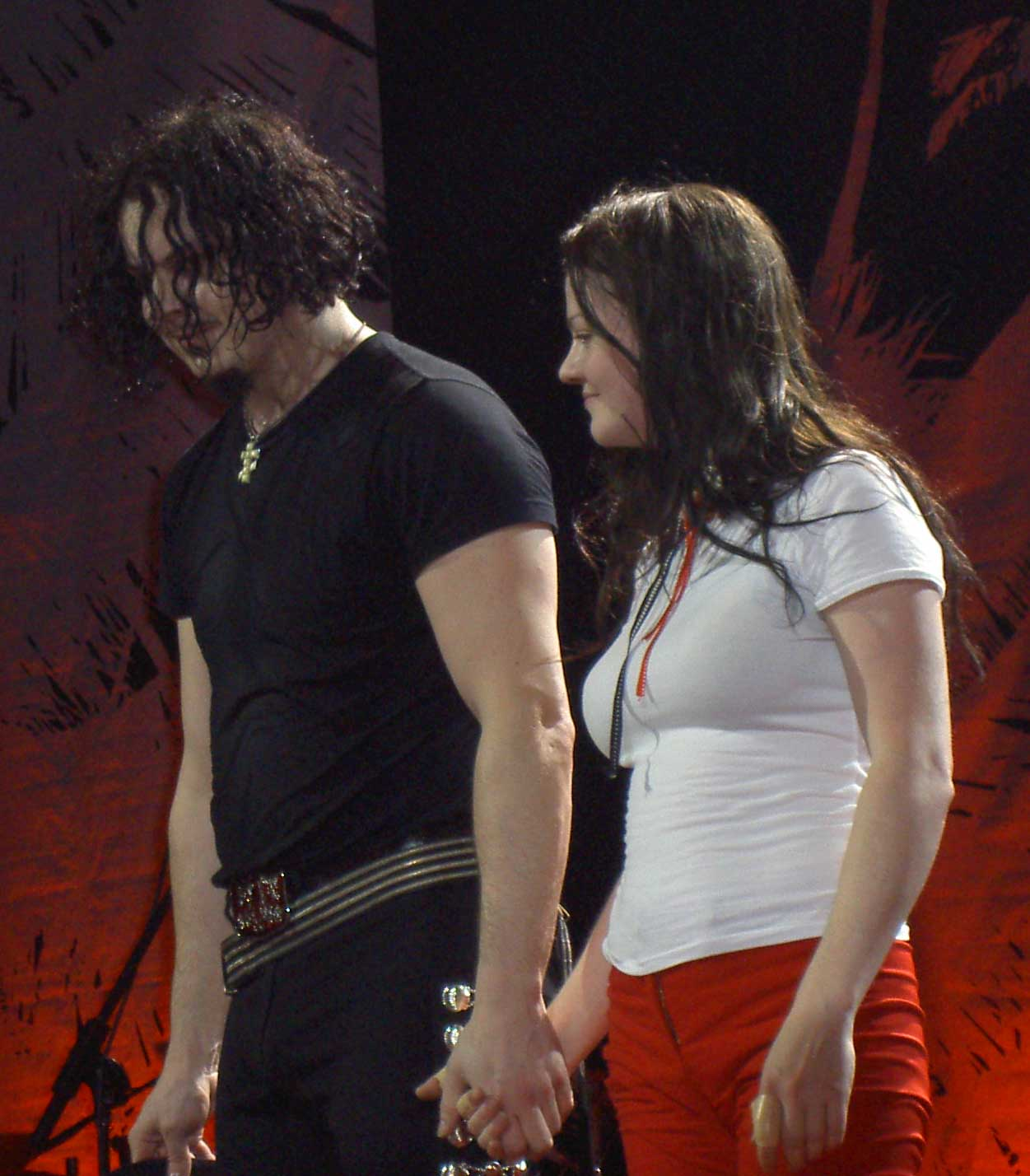
White Blood Cells brought the band to international fame. Jack (left) and Meg White (right) became key figures in the 2000s indie and garage rock movements.

White Blood Cells propelled the band to the forefront of the 2000s indie rock revival and garage rock revival, and is considered a defining album of the period. Retrospectively, it has been cited as one of the band's best works, and among the best albums of all time. Jon Lusk of BBC believed the album solidified their success thanks to "the crunching, insistent simplicity of Meg White's drumming, which sticks like glue to Jack White's intense, rhythmic, blues-based riffing; a broad, knowing sense of pop history, and of course their by now well-established red/white branding imagery." Paul Travers of Louder called it "one of the first great albums of the 21st century" and their best album. NPR rated White Blood Cells as one of the most important recordings of the decade, describing it as the band's "finest hour: a flawless slice of fuzzed-out, frenetic, trichromatic hip-shaking."

By the end of the 2000s, it was ranked as the best album of the decade by The A.V. Club and Uncut. Billboard, Rolling Stone, NME and Pitchfork featured the album within the top 20 of their respective lists, and Consequence of Sound, The Daily Californian, Glide, and Under the Radar featured the album within the top 30 of their respective lists. It also appeared on Spin's lists of the "Top 100 Albums of the Last 20 Years" and the "125 Best Albums of the Past 25 Years" in 2005 and 2010, respectively. It appeared on The Guardian's "1000 Albums To Hear Before You Die" list and ranked it number 178 on the Rock and Roll Hall of Fame's "200 Definitive Albums" list, both in 2007. Uncut ranked it first on their list of "The 150 Greatest Albums Of The 21st Century So Far" in 2009. Slant Magazine ranked it number 68 on their list of the "Top 250 Albums of the 2000s" in 2010. Rolling Stone ranked it number 497 on their "500 Greatest Albums of All Time" list in 2012. NME ranked it number 77 on their list of "The 500 Greatest Albums of All Time" in 2013. (Note: White Blood Cells is placed at 77, but is under the name De Stijl because of a misprint/typo.)

Redd Kross bassist Steven Shane McDonald created an online-only art project, titled Redd Blood Cells, in which he added a bass track to the otherwise bass-less album. The White Stripes arranged with Steven to take the files down after more than 60,000 downloads. British choreographer Wayne McGregor used the track "Aluminum"—among other of the band's songs—for his production Chroma, a piece he created for the Royal Ballet in London, England. It was played to the band as a surprise in Cincinnati Music Hall, Ohio in 2006, and won the 2007 Laurence Olivier Award for Best New Dance Production. In addition to Napoleon Dynamite, the song "We're Going to Be Friends" has appeared in the films Wonder (2017), and Mr. Harrigan's Phone (2022), and "Fell in Love with a Girl" was featured in the Oscar-winning film Silver Linings Playbook.

== Track listing ==
=== Original release ===
All lyrics are written by Jack White; all music is composed by Jack White and Meg White. The Japanese edition has "Jolene" (Dolly Parton) and "Hand Springs" as bonus tracks, both of which were recorded in 1999.

Side one
No.	Title	Length
1.	"Dead Leaves and the Dirty Ground"	3:04
2.	"Hotel Yorba"	2:10
3.	"I'm Finding It Harder to Be a Gentleman"	2:54
4.	"Fell in Love with a Girl"	1:50
5.	"Expecting"	2:03
6.	"Little Room"	0:50
7.	"The Union Forever"	3:26
8.	"The Same Boy You've Always Known"	3:09

Side two
No.	Title	Length
9.	"We're Going to Be Friends"	2:22
10.	"Offend in Every Way"	3:06
11.	"I Think I Smell a Rat"	2:04
12.	"Aluminum"	2:19
13.	"I Can't Wait"	3:38
14.	"Now Mary"	1:47
15.	"I Can Learn"	3:31
16.	"This Protector"	2:12
Total length:		40:31

=== 2021 deluxe release ===
For the 20th anniversary of the album, Third Man Records released White Blood Cells XX in April 2021, which is a reissue including home demos, early studio mixes, alternate takes, and a live show from September 6, 2001, at Headliner's in Louisville, Kentucky.

== Personnel ==
Credits are adapted from the album's liner notes.

The White Stripes

- Jack White – vocals, guitar, piano, production, mixing
- Meg White – drums, backing vocals

Production

- Stewart Sikes – engineering, mixing
- Fred Kevorkian – mastering

Artwork

- "The Third Man" – layout and design
- Twirly Red – layout and design
- Patrick Pantano – photography

== Charts ==
=== Weekly charts ===
2001–2002 weekly chart performance for White Blood Cells
Chart (2001–2002)	Peak position
Australian Albums (ARIA)	36
Canadian Albums (Nielsen Soundscan)	98
French Albums (SNEP)	114
Irish Albums (IRMA)	36
Norwegian Albums (VG-lista)	28
Scottish Albums (Official Charts)	68
Swedish Albums (Sverigetopplistan)	53
UK Albums (Official Charts)	55
US Billboard 200	61

2021 weekly chart performance for White Blood Cells
Chart (2021)	Peak position
German Albums (Offizielle Top 100)	57

=== Year-end charts ===
Year-end chart performance for White Blood Cells
Chart (2002)	Position
Canadian Albums (Nielsen SoundScan)	164
Canadian Alternative Albums (Nielsen SoundScan)	53
UK Albums (OCC)	149
US Billboard 200	176

== Certifications ==
Certifications and sales for White Blood Cells
Region	Certification	Certified units/sales
Australia (ARIA)	Gold	35,000^{^}
Canada (Music Canada)	Gold	50,000^{^}
Netherlands (NVPI)	Gold	40,000^{^}
United Kingdom (BPI)	Platinum	300,000^{*}
United States (RIAA)	Platinum	1,114,000
^{*} Sales figures based on certification alone.^{^} Shipments figures based on certification alone.

== See also ==
- Garage rock revival
- Post-punk revival
