= The Happy Bullets =

US musical group

- Origin: Dallas, Texas, United States
- Genres: Indie pop
- Years active: 2003–present
- Labels: Undeniable Records
- Members: Jason Roberts; Tim Ruble; Andrea Roberts; Josh McKibben; Rhett Jones

The Happy Bullets is an indie pop band from Dallas, Texas that formed in 2003.

The Happy Bullets began when indie songwriters Jason Roberts and Tim Ruble met while working together at an art gallery in a suburb of Dallas. After a home recording demo was released and played on local radio, Roberts quickly recruited his wife, Andrea to learn bass guitar while lending vocal support to several of the band's more pop-oriented songs. Additional members were later added including Josh McKibben, a landlord, of The Sons of Sound, James Porter from The Tah Dahs and Drawn By Jaymz, and Kris Youmans of The Paper Chase.

2004 saw the release of The Happy Bullets first record, Blue Skies and Umbrellas and was quickly followed up in 2005 with The Vice and Virtue Ministry, engineered by Stuart Sikes (Modest Mouse, Cat Power, the Promise Ring) and released on the upstart Dallas indie label Undeniable Records. The latter gained the band critical acclaim on the national college radio circuit and led to shared bills with Mates of State, Architecture in Helsinki, and Of Montreal.

In 2006, the Happy Bullets toured throughout the United States performing in Austin, Texas at the SXSW Music Festival, Athens, Georgia at the 2006 Athens Popfest, and at CMJ Music Festival in New York City.

== Discography ==
- Blue Skies and Umbrellas (2004)
- The Vice and Virtue Ministry (2005)
- Hydropanic at the Natatorium (2010)
