= Portland Oregon (song) =

Single by Loretta Lynn and Jack White

from the album Van Lear Rose
- Released: May 3, 2004
- Recorded: January 2004
- Genre: Country; alternative country
- Length: 2:44
- Label: Geffen; Interscope
- Songwriter: Loretta Lynn
- Producer: Jack White

Loretta Lynn singles chronology
"Miss Being Mrs." (2004)	"Portland Oregon" (2004)	"Coal Miner's Daughter" (2010)

Jack White singles chronology
"Sitting on Top of the World" (2003)	"Portland Oregon" (2004)	"Another Way to Die" (2008)

"Portland Oregon" is a song written and recorded by American country singer-songwriter Loretta Lynn. In 2004, she recorded the song as a duet with American rock musician Jack White. Shortly before its recording, White discovered the song on an old paper filed away in Lynn's attic. The song was among several old compositions Lynn recorded for her 2004 studio album, Van Lear Rose. "Portland Oregon" was among the singles released from the album. Upon its release, the single received positive reception from writers and critics.

== Composition and recording ==
Loretta Lynn had written the music and lyrics to "Portland Oregon" years prior to its recording date. The song was based on a true event, during a time when Lynn pretended to have a love affair with her guitarist, Cal Smith. In a 2005 interview with 60 Minutes, Lynn told journalist Mike Wallace that she had made up the romance to make her husband, Mooney Lynn, jealous. She did this because her husband had been getting involved with other women outside of their own marriage. Lynn named the song based on the setting in which the incident took place: a hotel in Portland, Oregon.

Once composing it, Lynn did not record it for many years until meeting rock artist Jack White. While meeting Lynn at her house for dinner, White came across a pile of handwritten songs. Among these songs was "Portland Oregon." It was decided that she would record the tune for upcoming 2004 studio release, which White produced. "Portland Oregon" was recorded in January 2004. The additional tracks for Lynn's upcoming album were also recorded during this time. White produced the song, along with the other tracks for the record. The track was recorded as a duet between Lynn and White.

== Critical reception ==
"Portland Oregon" was given positive reception from music critics and writers alike. Randy Erickson of the La Crosse Tribune called it "a fun song" with "snaky psychedelic guitar and building drums on the intro." Stephen Thomas Erlewine found that Lynn and White's duet partnership "complemented each other" in his review of her 2004 album. "The record captures the essence of Loretta Lynn's music even as it has flourishes that are distinctly Jack, such as the slide guitar that powers their duet, "Portland Oregon," he wrote.

Davis Inman of American Songwriter found the tune to capture the same message Lynn's earlier hits had captured: "The song seems like it could be based on something Lynn observed of her audience’s antics – much like "You Ain’t Woman Enough For My Man" was inspired by a young woman telling Lynn about her marital troubles backstage one night." Patrick Doyle of Rolling Stone called it "a boozy country epic with one of the greatest intros of the century."

== Release ==
"Portland Oregon" was spawned as the second single off of Lynn's 2004 studio album, Van Lear Rose. The single was officially issued to triple A radio on May 3, 2004. Van Lear Rose had been issued just six days earlier, on April 27. Although the song was released to various formats, including country music radio, it did not chart on any Billboard lists. This also occurred with her first single from Van Lear Rose entitled "Miss Being Mrs." The song was also issued as a single internationally, including Germany and Australia. To promote the single, Lynn performed the song on several television programs, including the Late Show with David Letterman.

The official music video for the song was directed by Sophie Muller, featuring both Lynn and White. The video was filmed in Memphis, Tennessee inside of a local club. Joe De Angelo of MTV later commented on the music video: "make googley eyes at each other throughout the clip. And to top it all off, toward the end of the clip, White even gives the great-grandmother some sugar with a kiss on the lips!" In 2005, the song won Lynn and White the Best Country Collaboration with Vocals accolade from the Grammy Awards. That night Lynn would win a second Grammy for Best Country Album.

== Track listing ==
CD single

- "Portland Oregon" (radio edit) – 2:44
- "Portland Oregon" (album version) – 3:47

== Accolades ==
Year	Association	Category	Result
2005	Grammy Awards	Best Country Collaboration with Vocals	Won
2005	Grammy Awards	Best Country Song	Nominated
