= Third Man Records =

American record label

- Founded: 2001; 25 years ago
- Founder: Jack White, Ben Swank, Ben Blackwell
- Distributor: The Orchard
- Genre: Blues rock; alternative rock; garage rock; folk; country; hip hop
- Country of origin: United States
- Location: 623 7th Avenue South; Nashville, Tennessee; 441 West Canfield Street; Detroit, Michigan; 1 Marshall Street; Soho, London
- Official website: thirdmanrecords.com

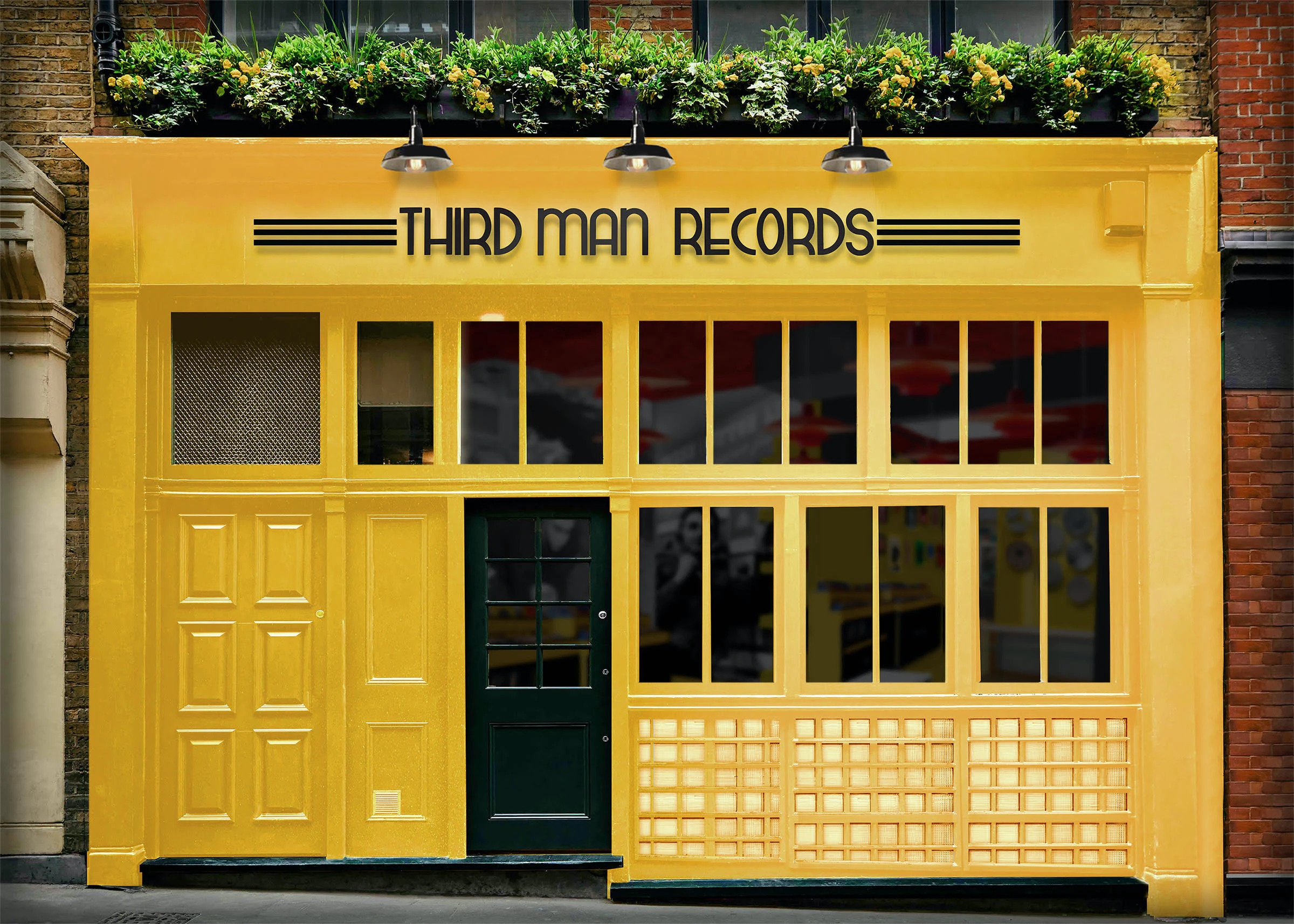
The front facade of the Third Man Records store at 1 Marshall Street in Soho, London

Third Man Records is an independent record label founded and owned by Jack White, Ben Blackwell, and Ben Swank. The company operates out of three locations—Nashville, Detroit in the Cass Corridor, and Soho in London—with multiple entities expanding upon the offerings of a traditional record label, including multiple live music venues, vinyl pressing plant, film studio and dark room, guitar pedal and gear company, mastering studio, vinyl subscription service, and a publishing arm.

== History ==
In 2001, while Jack White was gaining regional notice in the White Stripes in Detroit, he registered the label Third Man Records, proceeding to trademark the name in 2004. It was not until 2008 when the White Stripes stopped touring and recording, and after White had reclaimed the rights to the band's earlier music, that White turned his focus to the label.

White recruited his nephew, White Stripes archivist and Dirtbombs drummer Ben Blackwell and his lifelong friend, Ben Swank, then the drummer for the Soledad Brothers and a promoter in London, to create a working business on March 11, 2009. White conceived the expansion idea in October 2008, phoning Swank and Blackwell to say the venture should first concentrate on releasing White Stripes' back catalog on vinyl. Blackwell moved from Detroit and Swank from London to establish the business. The Nashville location is a record store, label and has publishing offices; The Blue Room live venue and bar; photo studio/darkroom, master recordings vault, and a fulfillment center. To commemorate the opening of Third Man Records in Nashville, White debuted his new project, the Dead Weather, performing a short set for the 150 invited guests and coining the label's motto, "Your Turntable's Not Dead."

The label's name incorporates several elements of personal significance to White. His fondness for the number three is well documented. It refers to Carol Reed's The Third Man starring Joseph Cotten and Orson Welles. White's pre-White Stripes upholstering company, which he continues to maintain as a hobby and artistic outlet in the present day, is named Third Man Upholstery; it is similarly identified by the colors yellow and black and the motto “Your Upholstery’s Not Dead.”

Third Man has since reissued all six White Stripes studio releases on vinyl. The label’s catalog has grown to over 800 releases including albums by White’s other acts, contributions from Billie Eilish, Neil Young, Sleep, Metallica, Margo Price, Coldplay, and Jay-Z, as well as many developing artists.

== Physical locations ==
=== Nashville ===
The label's headquarters is located in a less prosperous neighborhood which is home to the Nashville Rescue Mission, the largest homeless shelter in the city; a transitional housing and recuperation center, and an affordable healthcare clinic. White's presence has raised the area's prominence, motivating the city and business owners to rezone the area with more commercial ventures, including multiple mixed-use developments, a Ritz Carlton Hotel, and a members' club. White opposes the idea, calling the environment "a solid neighborhood [where] everyone looks out for each other." The location is organized around five dedicated sections: the record store, a "novelties lounge", the label's offices and distribution center, a live venue and bar (The Blue Room), and a darkroom/photo studio.

The Novelties Lounge, located within the record store, debuted on November 23, 2012. The space contains a collection of vintage novelty machines. "Among the attractions in the new wing is a Scopitone machine—a video jukebox using 16mm film that had its greatest prominence in the 1960s. Third Man has loaded their Scopitone with 36 videos from the label catalog, and bill it as 'the world's ONLY Scopitone machine fully loaded with modern music.' Other highlights include a "Wax-O-Matic machine", which makes bright red wax molds of White's Airline guitar, and a full-color photo booth." On April 20, 2013, in celebration of Jack White's role as Record Store Day Ambassador, The Third Man Recording Booth, "a refurbished 1947 Voice-o-Graph machine that can record up to two minutes audio and press it onto 6-inch phonograph discs" was introduced as an addition to the Novelties Lounge. This voice-o-graph was used in the creating of Apple's 2014 holiday ad as shown in the behind the scene video. In August 2017, Third Man celebrated the total solar eclipse happening event "Occulting the Sunn", in Nashville.

=== Detroit ===
In 2015, White partnered with Shinola—a lifestyle brand most known as a watch manufacturer—to open a retail location in Detroit. Third Man opened its first branch location at the former Willy's Overland Motorland Company in Detroit's Cass Corridor by Record Store Day's Black Friday event on November 27, 2015.

In February 2017, the Third Man Pressing plant opened in Third Man Records' Detroit location, the first pressing plant to open in the city since 1965. The plant began with eight Newbilt presses imported from Germany. In 2019 it expanded adding Third Man Mastering, which provides audio mastering services as well as vinyl lacquer cutting.

=== London ===
In September 2021, Third Man Records opened a third retail location, live venue, and label office in London's Soho neighborhood. During the grand opening, White performed in the basement venue as well as from the balcony belonging to visual artist Damien Hirst, whose building sits at the end of the street.

=== Rolling Record Store ===
On March 9, 2011, Third Man Records announced its newest creation, the Third Man Rolling Record Store. It is a yellow step-van outfitted with a sound system and Third Man Records inventory. It was built by C. Cook Enterprises in Erlanger, Kentucky. It made its first appearance in Austin, Texas at SXSW 2011. Third Man has since brought the mobile store to concerts, festivals, and other events with anywhere from weeks to only a few hours’ notice.

== Third Man Records Vault ==
The Third Man Records Vault is a "rarity-excavating" quarterly subscription service that began in September 2009 as a way to release special and otherwise unreleased content. Platinum members of the Vault receive a package containing limited-edition vinyl records and merchandise every three months. Generally each cycle's offerings have included a 12-inch record, a 7-inch record and a "bonus item" (which may include items such as posters, books, or pins); however, the format has been deviated from multiple times.

Year	Quarter	Vault #	Title	Artist	Vault Package Contents
2009	3	1	Icky Thump (mono)	The White Stripes	The Dead Weather - Forever My Queen 7-inch, Third Man T-Shirt
2009	4	2	Live London	The Raconteurs	The White Stripes - Let's Shake Hands (Alternate Take) 7-inch, The Dead Weather Print
2010	1	3	Third Man Single Releases 2009 Volume One	Third Man Records	The Dead Weather - No Horse (First Take) 7-inch, Third Man Records Postcards
2010	2	4	Under Great White Northern Lights	The White Stripes	The Raconteurs - Top Yourself (Rehearsal Demo), The Dead Weather T-Shirt
2010	3	5	Sea of Cowards Live at Third Man Records	The Dead Weather	Live at Third Man Records Encore 7-inch, Live at Third Man Records DVD
2010	4	6	Boscobel Blues	The Greenhornes	Hello Operator by The White Stripes (7-inch Picture Disc), The White Stripes & The Greenhornes Vault T-Shirt
2011	1	7	Third Man Records Singles Compilation 2010	Third Man Records	Party of Special Things to Do by The White Stripes 7-inch, Great Balls of Fire by The 5.6.7.8’s 7-inch
2011	2	8	Live in Mississippi	The White Stripes	Signed DC 7-inch, Under Moorhead Lights All Fargo Night DVD
2011	3	9	Live at Third Man Records	Wanda Jackson	The Big Three Killed My Baby by 2 Star Tabernacle 7-inch, Live at Third Man Records by Wanda Jackson DVD
2011	4	10	Live at Third Man Records	The Raconteurs	White Stripes Remixes by Beck, Josh Homme & Mark Lanegan 7-inch, Third Man’s 2010 Devil’s Night w/ Elvira, The Greenhornes & The Black Belles DVD
2012	1	11	Third Man Records Singles Compilation 2011	Third Man Records	Dead Leaves by The White Stripes 7-inch
2012	2	12	Live at Third Man	Karen Elson	Open Your Eyes by The Raconteurs 7-inch, Under New Zealand Lights by The White Stripes DVD
2012	3	13	Live at the Gold Dollar	The White Stripes	Live on Bastille Day ’97 7-inch, Peppermint Logo Tote Bag, Set List & Flier Replica
2012	4	14	Live at Third Man Records	Jack White	Blunderbuss Demos by Jack White 7-inch, Shark Infested Soda Fountain by Alison Mosshart Photobook
2013	1	15	Live on the Garden Bowl Lanes	Jack White & The Bricks	Demos by Brendan Benson & Jack White 7-inch, White Heat Tour by Whirlwind Heat & The White Stripes DVD
2013	2	16	Nine Miles from The White City	The White Stripes	I Want To Be The Boy To Warm Your Mother’s Heart by The White Stripes 7-inch, Pictures from Elephant by David Swanson (Photobook)
2013	3	17	Live at Third Man Records	Willie Nelson & Friends	Red Headed Stranger (from Third Man Record Booth) by Willie Nelson & Jack White 6", Double-Sided Foldout Metallic Poster of Willie Nelson, 3D Tesla Tower turntable topper
2013	4	18	Live at The Ryman Auditorium	The Raconteurs	Open Up (That’s Enough) b/w Rough Detective by The Dead Weather 7-inch, Live at The Ryman Auditorium by The Raconteurs DVD
2014	1	19	The Elephant Singles Box	The White Stripes	Seven Nation Army by The White Stripes 7-inch, "I Just Don't Know What to Do with Myself" by The White Stripes (7-inchVinyl), The Hardest Button to Button by The White Stripes 7-inch, There’s No Home For You Here by The White Stripes 7-inch
2014	2	20	Lazaretto	Jack White	Lazaretto Demos by Jack White 7-inch, Lazaretto Companion Book by Jack White
2014	3	21	Live Under The Lights of the Rising Sun	The White Stripes	Buzzkiller b/w It’s Just Too Bad by The Dead Weather 7-inch, Third Man Records Flag
2014	4	22	Live From Bonnaroo 2014	Jack White	Live From Bonnaroo 2014 by Jack White DVD, Custom Television USB with Exclusive Content, Jack White TV Patch, Replica Backstage Pass Sticker, Surprise Tour Poster, Four 8x10 Photographs
2015	1	23	Under Amazonian Lights	The White Stripes	Let You Down / Ain't No Sweeter Than Rita Blues by The White Stripes 7-inch, Under Amazonian Lights by The White Stripes DVD, Death Head Monkey Pin, Rob Jones Postcards, Silkscreened Poster
2015	2	24	Van Lear Rose	Loretta Lynn	Rated X B/W Whispering Sea by the White Stripes 7-inch, Remembering Van Lear Rose DVD, Bonus Enamel Van Lear Rose Pin, Photographs from Van Lear Rose Photoshoot
2015	3	25	Dodge and Burn	The Dead Weather	I Feel Love / Cop and Go by the Dead Weather 7-inch, The Dead Weather Playing Cards, The Dead Weather Poster
2015	4	26	Live At The Gold Dollar Vol III	The White Stripes	Impossible Winner b/w Mile Markers by The Dead Weather 7-inch, Third Man Records Enamel Pin, Original Show Flyer Iron-On Decal
2016	1	27	Live At The Gold Dollar	Jack White & The Bricks, Two Star Tabernacle, and The Go	Let Me Through b/w Be Still by The Dead Weather 7-inch, Third Man Challenge Coin
2016	2	28	Acoustic In Idaho	Jack White	Acoustic In Alaska by Jack White DVD, Two Risograph Photo Prints, Pictures from Unknown States from Third Man Books
2016	3	29	Live To Acetate At TMR	Pearl Jam	Record Booth 7-inch Single by Eddie Vedder, Pearl Jam @ TMR Patch, Pearl Jam Live At TMR Photo Book, Pearl Jam @ TMR Metal Pin
2016	4	30	Live At Irving Plaza	The Raconteurs	The Dead Weather, The Kills and William Tyler Live at Disgraceland LP (12-inch Vinyl), Love Is The Truth (Acoustic Mix) b/w City Lights by Jack White and The White Stripes 7-inch, Nashville Pennant
2017	1	31	Live at the Hamilton	Margo Price	Blue Room Sessions 7-inch by Margo Price 7-inch, Enamel Collar Pin with Chain, Live At Austin City Limits DVD by Margo Price, 2017 Challenge Coin
2017	2	32	Live at the Mayan	The Dead Weather	Three Dollar Hat B/w Lose The Right 7-inch, 7-inch Series Dodge & Burn Single Box by The Dead Weather (Box Only), Live at the Mayan by The Dead Weather DVD, Oroboros Key
2017	3	33	Icky Thump X	The White Stripes	Icky Thump 12-inch, The Red Demos 12-inch, Icky Thump B-Sides 12-inch, Icky Thump X Telescoping Box, Pictures from Icky Photo Book, Horse Double Pin Set, Mysery Rob Jones Print
2017	4	34	Live In Detroit	The White Stripes	Live at the Magic Bag July 30, 1999, Live at the Magic Stick August 18, 2000, Live at the Gold Dollar IV June 7, 2001, Show Poster Reproduction Prints
2018	1	35	Boarding House Reach	Jack White	Infected By Love b/w Why Walk A Dog? by Jack White 7-inch, Three David Swanson Photographs from Boarding House Reach sessions, Three foil-stamped poetry broadsides, 2018 Challenge Coin
2018	2	36	Trout Mask Replica	Captain Beefheart and His Magic Band	Double Fruitcake Fish-Scaled LP, Pachuco Cadaver b/w Wild Life by Captain Beefheart & His Magic Band 7-inch, Trout Mask Replica tote bag, Replica Trout Mask, Jack White's Epitaph for Don Van Vliet, Trout Mask Replica Patch
2018	3	37	Live at Third Man Records Nashville and Cass Corridor	Jack White	Logo Flag, Black LP, Blue LP, White LP and 8x10 Photos
2018	4	38	Consolers of the Lonely	The Raconteurs	Patch, Double Copper Foil LP, Mixed Metal 7-inch and Sticker Set
2019	1	39	Live at Third Man Records	Sleep	Poster, Purple LP, Orange LP, Blue LP, Green LP and Patch
2019	2	40	Help Us Stranger	The Raconteurs	Bandana, Marble LP, Black 7-inch and Slipmat
2019	3	41	Whatcha Doin’: 20th Anniversary Remix Redux	The Go	Photo Book, Summer Sun LP, Mottled Carpet Remnant LP, and Black 7-inch
2019	4	42	The White Stripes XX: 20th Anniversary	The White Stripes	Hardcover Case, Booklet, Red LP, White LP and DVD
2020	1	43	Live in Tulsa	The Raconteurs	Tri-fold Jacket, Copper LP, Green LP, Black LP, DVD and Flexi-disc
2020	2	44	The Accompaniment to De Stijl: The White Stripes’ Sophomore Album	The White Stripes	Hardcover Case, Booklet, White LP, Red LP and DVD
2020	3	45	Johnny Cash: A Night To Remember	Johnny Cash	Gold Foil LP Jacket, 2X Vintage White LP, Gold 7-inch and DVD
2020	4	46	The White Stripes: Greatest Hits	The White Stripes	Gatefold LP Jacket, White LP, Red LP, Detonation LP, Three Mystery Rob Jones Prints and Lyric Magnets
2021	1	47	Jack White: Live at the Masonic Temple	Jack White	Slipcase, White LP, Blue LP, Black LP, Marbled Blue Mix LP and SNL Black 7-inch
2021	2	48	White Blood Cells XX	The White Stripes	Slip Case, 2 LPs (Demos and Live at Headliners) DVD of Behind the Scenes Production, Album Photo Booklet, Info Card
2021	3	49	Springtime In New York: The Bootleg Series Vol. 16 1980-1985	Bob Dylan	Slip Case, 4 Jackets, 4 LPs, Line Notes/Track Notations Booklet, Info Card
2021	4	50	Live At The Detroit Institute Of Arts	The White Stripes	Gatefold Jakcet, 2 LPs, DVD w/ Case, 4 Photo Prints, 7" w/ Jack White's "Taking Me Back" and "Taking Me Back (Gently)," Info Card
2022	1	51	Carole King Home Again	Carole King	Custom Gatefold Jacket, Custom Inner Sleeves, 2 Brick Red LPs, DVD w/ Case, 7” w/ Lucy Dacus’ “Home Again” b/w “It’s Too Late,” and Info Card
2022	2	52	Dopesmoker	Sleep	Custom Slipcase, 4 Jackets, 4 Green Kush Vinyl LPs, 7" w/ SLEEP's "Dopesmoker" Radio Edit b/w "Weedian," 2 Posters
2022	3	53	The Revenant Juke A Collection of Fables and Farce	Primus	Six colored 7" records housed in custom box set case. Soft Purple, Bitter Lime, Fermented Orange, Bruised Peach, Ducky Yellow, Generic Turquoise.
2022	4	54	The Supply Chain Issues Tour	Jack White	Trifold LP Jacket with 3 LP's Black/Blue/White and a Glitter Blue 7" single
2023	1	55	Elephant XX	The White Stripes	Custom Slip case with booklet, 2 LP's Red/White, 7" record and DVD
2023	2	56	Fearless	Miles Davis	Three LP's Deep Red/Red/Pink, 7" record, bumper sticker and patch
2023	3	57	The Solo Works of Syd Barrett	Syd Barrett	Three LP's The Madcap Laughs/Barrett/Opal, 7" record in custom slip case
2023	4	58	The White Stripes - Live in Las Vegas	The White Stripes	Three LP's Red/White/Black, 7" Bob Dylan in Sparkle Red, Bumper Sticker, Patch, Rob Jones Prints
2024	1	59	Elvis Presley at 706 Union Ave: The Sun Singles 1954-55	Elvis Presley	5 x 45s "Memphis Dust", 1 x EP, Postcards, Patch, 45 Adapter
2024	2	60	Third Man Live	Jack White, Dinosaur Jr., Witch (American band)	3 x Skycloud Marble Live LPs, 7" Mudhoney Single, Bumper Sticker
2024	3	61	The 1974 Live Recordings: The Missing Songs from Before The Flood	Bob Dylan & The Band	3 Live LPs, 7" Single, Tour Program
2024	4	62	Raw Power: The 7-Inch Edition	Iggy & The Stooges	4 x 7" Singles (2 tracks from album on each single), 2 x 7" Outtake EP, Cheetah Patch
2025	1	63	Get Behind Me Satan XX	The White Stripes	Custom Slip case with booklet, 2 LP's Red/White, 7" record and Blu-ray
2025	2	64	BREAK IT ALL DOWN!!!	Jack White	3xLP Live Album, Patch, Instant Print Photo, and Poster
2025	3	65	Psychocandy 40th Anniversary Edition	The Jesus and Mary Chain	2xLP 45 RPM Version of Psychocandy, 2 LP Live Detroit Recording from 1987, and Metallic Gold 7"
2025	4	66	Billy Strings: Live in Rosemont	Billy Strings	4xLP on Randomly Colored Vinyl and First Ever Pressing of Billy Strings' Debut EP
2026	1	67	Jimi Hendrix "Valley of Jams 1969-1970"	Jimi Hendrix	3xLP, 1x7-inch single, Patch, and Bumper Sticker

== Discography ==
Third Man releases some music on compact disc and via electronic release on iTunes; however, its primary format is vinyl records.

In addition to pressing titles on regular black vinyl, most releases have an exclusive and/or limited sister pressing on colored or multicolored vinyl. Beginning with TMR-003, a limited edition handmade batch of 100 tri-colored 7-inch vinyl, in equal parts black, yellow, and white, were produced for exclusive distribution at Third Man's Nashville location. Beginning with TMR-009, an additional 50 tri-colored vinyl have been pressed for random distribution in Third Man mail orders. Certain single releases have been sold on tri-colored vinyl available at record stores in the artist's hometown instead of at the Nashville store. An additional 50 are still randomly distributed in mail orders.

Recordings from live shows in the Blue Room (recorded either directly to analog reel-to-reel tape or direct-to-acetate) are made available in black and blue vinyl in varying quantities. The split-color records are available only to show attendees, and each LP is sealed with a concert-specific label on which the purchaser's name is written.

Third Man is known for pushing the boundaries with vinyl record production, and with the help of United Record Pressing (their main partner in manufacturing records prior to the opening of Third Man Pressing), their innovations include the following unique record pressings: Glow In The Dark Record, Triple-Decker Record (a 7-inch within a 12-inch), Texas-Sized Record (8" and 13" records), Metallized Record, Liquid-Filled Record, Scented Record, Rose Petal-Filled Record, Playable Etching Record, 3 RPM Record, Lightning Bolt Record, Bolt-A-Trope Record, and the Flex-Ray Record (a flexi disc made from an x-ray).

Two albums released by Third Man Records have received sales certification awards from the Recording Industry Association of America: White Blood Cells by the White Stripes was certified Platinum with sales of at least 1 million units and Blunderbuss by Jack White was certified Gold with sales of at least 500,000 units. Additionally the DVD release of the White Stripes documentary film Under Great White Northern Lights was certified Gold for longform video sales of at least 50,000 units.

== Publications ==
Third Man Books, the publishing arm of Third Man Records, has published many books. It also publishes the quarterly music magazine Maggot Brain.

== See also ==
- List of record labels
