= Dan John Miller =

American singer-songwriter

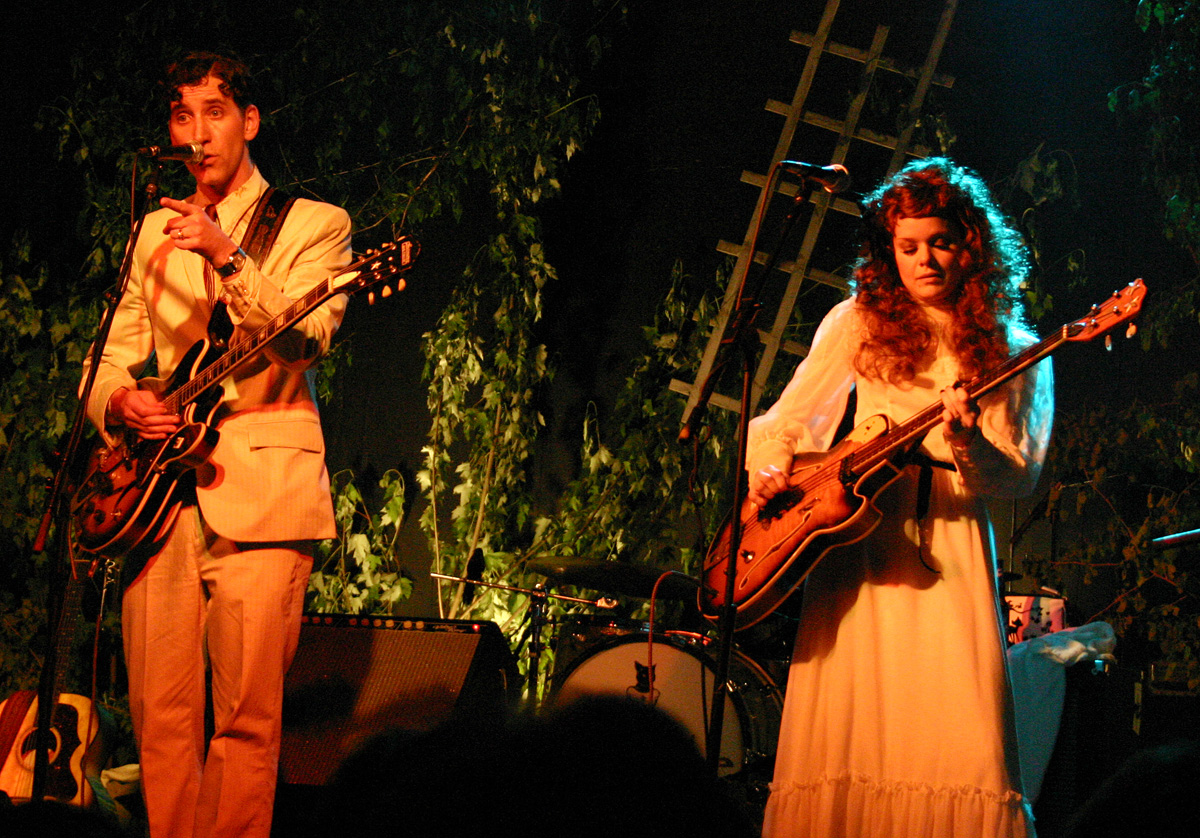
- Dan John Miller and Tracee Mae Miller

Background information
- Occupations: Musician, singer-songwriter, actor
- Labels: Cass Records; V2 Records
- Website: http://www.danjohnmiller.com

Dan John Miller is an American singer-songwriter and actor from Detroit, Michigan. He is currently the guitarist and lead vocalist for the gothic country-garage band Blanche. He made his major film acting debut in the film Walk The Line, playing Johnny Cash's guitar player Luther Perkins.

== Biography ==
=== Career ===
Miller's musical career began in the 1990s, fronting the country-punk band Goober and the Peas, whom The Austin Chronicle called "the most exciting live band in America" after playing South By Southwest. The band toured with such bands as Uncle Tupelo and Morphine, and released two albums. He collaborated again with Jack White in the band Two Star Tabernacle, mixing elements of raw country and garage rock.

Currently, Miller and wife Tracee Mae Miller front the gothic country-garage band Blanche. The band's critically acclaimed debut album, If We Can't Trust the Doctors, was released on V2 Records at the end of 2004. Their second album, Little Amber Bottles, was released to similar critical acclaim in 2007.

As a solo performer, he was chosen to perform at Dave Eggers' Revenge of the Book–Eaters benefit concerts. He has also played with Ralph Stanley, Josh Ritter, and the Mekons. As part of the promotion for the release of Walk The Line, Miller performed solo along with the Tennessee Three at the ArcLight Theatre in Hollywood.

Miller also played and sang on Loretta Lynn's Grammy-winning album Van Lear Rose, as well as Charlie Louvin's (of country legends the Louvin Brothers) Grammy-nominated, self-titled album.

Miller has made cameos in music videos by the Melvins, the Soledad Brothers, and the White Stripes.

An acclaimed audiobook narrator, Miller was named a Best Voice by AudioFile for performances of Pat Conroy's The Lords of Discipline and Philip Roth's My Life as a Man. In 2009, he was nominated for two Audies, and garnered a Golden Earphone award (Audiofile), and a Listen Up! award from Publishers Weekly.

=== Instruments ===
Miller plays a Harmony H60 Meteor archtop guitar mostly on tours with a Fender Twin Reverb amplifier and occasionally a Danelectro Daddy-O distortion pedal. He also plays a Gibson J-100 acoustic guitar.

=== Marriage and children ===
Miller is married with two children.

== Solo discography ==
As musician:

- Loretta Lynn, Van Lear Rose (2004) – acoustic guitar, percussion, background vocals
- Charlie Louvin, Charlie Louvin (2006) – vocals

As director:

- The White Stripes, "Hotel Yorba" – co-director, music video

== Filmography ==
- Murder Too Sweet (1994), priest
- Timequest (2000), Dan Rather
- Walk the Line (2005), Luther Perkins
- Mr. Woodcock (2007), Family Man
- Leatherheads (2008), Hotel Clerk
