= Third Man Records Cass Corridor =

Recording studio, pressing plant, and record store in Michigan

- Address: 441 West Canfield Street
- Location: Detroit, Michigan, United States
- Owner: Third Man Records
- Type: Recording studio Record store Pressing plant

Construction
- Opened: November 27, 2015

Third Man Records: Cass Corridor is a recording studio, record pressing plant, music venue, and, record store located in Detroit, Michigan owned by Jack White, the former lead singer of the White Stripes.

== History ==
In 2001, while Jack White was gaining regional notice in the White Stripes in Detroit, he registered the label Third Man Records, proceeding to trademark the name in 2004. It was not until 2008 when the White Stripes stopped touring and recording, and after White had reclaimed the rights to the band's earlier music, that White turned his focus to the label.

In 2015, White partnered with Shinola—a lifestyle brand most known as a watch manufacturer—to open a retail location in Detroit, the city where the label was first established, after purchasing a building which once housed the former Willy's Overland Motorland Company in Detroit's Cass Corridor. The store opened as part of Record Store Day's Black Friday event on November 27, 2015 with a recording booth and a live concert stage featured in the store.

In February 2017, the Third Man Pressing plant opened in Third Man Records' Detroit location, the first pressing plant to open in the city since 1965. The plant began with eight Newbilt presses imported from Germany. In 2019, the store added Third Man Mastering, which provides audio mastering services as well as vinyl lacquer cutting.

On April 18, 2018, one day prior to a concert at Little Caesars Arena, Jack White held a surprise concert at the store.

On July 8, 2026, the store hosted a listening party for Jack White's Frozen Charlotte album.
