= The Art Conspiracy =

Dallas-based non-profit art collective

The Art Conspiracy is a Dallas-based non-profit art collective.

== History ==
The group was founded by photographer Sarah Jane Semrad and musician Jason Roberts in the fall of 2005 to help raise money for local charities while providing a forum for area artists and musicians to combine forces and promote their works. The group's inaugural gala was held on December 3, 2005, at the Texas Theater (the site of Lee Harvey Oswald's arrest) and raised over $10,000 for the Dallas chapter of the Children's Health Fund. The concept for the event included gathering 100 artists together twenty four hours prior to the event, and having them paint on a single sheet of 18" x 18" plywood. The following day, doors were opened to the long vacant theater and a crowd of close to 1000 people quickly purchased all available pieces through an auction process while local musicians performed.

== Personnel ==
- Sarah Jane Semrad – Art Co-Ordinator
- Jason Roberts – Music Co-Ordinator
- Andrea Roberts – Sponsorship Procurement
- Cari Weinberg – PR
- Shea Wood – Stage Design
- Courtney Miles – Stage Design
- Nyddia Hannah – Concessions
- Tim Ruble – Project Manager
