= The Tah Dahs =

- Origin: Dallas, Texas, United States
- Genres: Indie rock, garage rock
- Years active: 2001–present
- Labels: Undeniable Records
- Members: Roy Ivy; James Porter; Charlie Papathanasiou

The Tah Dahs are a Dallas-based indie rock band formed in 2001 by Roy Ivy and James Porter. The original lineup started as a five-piece and included friends Chris Fowler on rhythm and Wurlitzer, Michael Bryant on guitar and Rebecca Kraemer on viola. Ivy left for a year's stint to tour and record with the Polyphonic Spree. On his return to Dallas, the band trimmed down to a power trio and began to write a more aggressive style of pop music. In 2005, the band released Le Fun on Dallas's indie label Undeniable Records. Later that year, work began with Stuart Sikes (Modest Mouse, Cat Power, The Promise Ring) on a follow-up album due out in late 2006.
