= Miss Being Mrs. =

Single by Loretta Lynn

from the album Van Lear Rose
- Released: April 2004
- Recorded: January 2004
- Genre: Country; Alt. country
- Length: 2:50
- Label: Interscope
- Songwriters: Loretta Lynn, Maggie Vaughn
- Producer: Jack White

Loretta Lynn singles chronology
"Table for Two" (2001)	"Miss Being Mrs." (2004)	"Portland, Oregon" (2004)

"Miss Being Mrs." is a song written and recorded by American country singer-songwriter Loretta Lynn. It was the first single released off her 2004 studio album, Van Lear Rose, released on Interscope Records. The song was produced by American rock musician Jack White, who discovered the composition when he was visiting Lynn at her home. It was then recorded and released as a single in 2004. Since its release, "Miss Being Mrs." has received positive critical response.

== Background and content ==
Loretta Lynn's husband, Oliver "Mooney" Lynn, was responsible for helping her launch a music career. Discovering her ability to sing, he encouraged her to perform in public. This led to her first recording contract and success as a country music artist. For many years, they continued their musical partnership despite a tumultuous relationship. In 1996, Mooney Lynn died after many years of illness. Lynn wrote "Miss Being Mrs." in the wake of her husband's death. The song describes the loneliness Lynn felt as a widow and loneliness surrounding it. Writer Stephen Deusner commented that "Miss Being Mrs." was also "about sex, about love, about security, and ultimately about the realization that all of that is gone–nothing but a memory at this point in her life."

Lynn recorded the song for her 2004 studio album, Van Lear Rose. Rock musician Jack White discovered the song in a pile of old handwritten lyrics in Lynn's house. Once White and Lynn decided to record together, he encouraged her to cut "Miss Being Mrs." "Miss Being Mrs." was recorded in January 2004, along with Lynn's other recordings for the album. The song's only musical accompaniment is Lynn's voice and an acoustic guitar played by White.

== Critical reception ==
"Miss Being Mrs." received positive reviews from music critics and writers alike. Stephen Thomas Erlewine of Allmusic called the song's production "spare and "sad." Stephen Desuner of The Bluegrass Situation said that the song showcases Lynn's best writing. "It’s her self-penned 'Miss Being Mrs.', a tune that typifies Lynn’s genius – an ability to speak to her own situation, and to those of her audience at the same time. Rob Shefield of Rolling Stone also gave the song a positive response while reviewing her 2004 studio release: "'Miss Being Mrs.' slams home because she’s so forthright about the loneliness of life as a widow...It evokes 'This Haunted House,' the song she wrote for Patsy Cline’s husband back in 1964, as well as the love songs she wrote about Doo while he was alive, and it’s a heart-rending tribute. Taste of Country ranked "Miss Being Mrs." on their list of the "Top 10 Loretta Lynn Songs." Writers commented that the song had "a closer connection to Lynn’s heart, as it was released as a tribute to her late husband."

== Release ==
"Miss Being Mrs." was released as the first single from Lynn's 2004 studio album, Van Lear Rose. The single was issued in April 2004 via Interscope Records. It was Lynn's first single release for the label. A second single would also be spawned from Van Lear Rose later that year. It was issued as a CD single on the Interscope label. Despite its critical success, "Miss Being Mrs." did not place on any Billboard surveys, including the Hot Country Songs chart. The album's second single release ("Portland, Oregon") would also not chart. A music video for the track was released in May 2004 directed by Trey Fanjoy. The video was filmed on Lynn's plantation home in Hurricane Mills, Tennessee. It also included an appearance by Jack White playing acoustic guitar. The single was promoted at the Academy of Country Music Awards around the same time when Lynn performed the track alongside Vince Gill on acoustic guitar.

== Track listing ==
CD single

- "Miss Being Mrs." – 2:50

== Accolades ==
Year	Association	Category	Result
2005	Grammy Awards	Best Country Song	Nominated
2005	Grammy Awards	Best Female Country Vocal Performance	Nominated
