= Stuart Sikes =

American recording engineer

Stuart Sikes is an American recording engineer and producer best known for his work with the White Stripes and for engineering Loretta Lynn's Grammy Award-winning album Van Lear Rose, as well as producing Cat Power's 2006 Shortlist Music Prize-winning album The Greatest.

== Early life and education ==
Sikes grew up in Plano, Texas and graduated from Plano East High School in 1991. He attended Full Sail University. When his sister, who was living in Memphis, Tennessee, learned that Sonic Youth had recently recorded at Easley-McCain Recording, she suggested Sikes move to Memphis and get a job there.

== Career ==
Sikes was hired at Easley-McCain as an intern in 1995 and advanced to assistant in less than 6 months. During this time, the studio worked on projects by such bands as Cat Power, Modest Mouse, the Walkmen, Rocket from the Crypt, and the Spinanes.

Sikes' first project at the studio was Two Dollar Guitar including band members Tim Foljahn and Sonic Youth drummer Steve Shelley. Sessions he engineered at Easley-McCain included The Promise Ring's 1997 album Nothing Feels Good, Jets to Brazil's 1998 album Orange Rhyming Dictionary, and The White Stripes' 2001 album White Blood Cells.

Sikes relocated to Dallas in 2001. He returned to Memphis to engineer Loretta Lynn's 2004 album Van Lear Rose, produced by Jack White, which earned Sikes a Grammy Award for Best Country Album in 2005. Back in Dallas, he engineered the Happy Bullets' 2005 album The Vice and Virtue Ministry, then returned to Ardent Studios in Memphis to produce Cat Power's 2006 Shortlist Music Prize-winning album The Greatest.

In August, 2006 Sikes found a space for a permanent recording studio in the Elmwood residential area within the Oak Cliff neighborhood of Dallas. Sikes renovated the space himself and opened the studio as Elmwood Recording. John Congleton became involved with the studio, and took it over after Sikes relocated to Austin in 2012.
