= Two-Star Tabernacle =

American punk rock band

- Promotional picture of the band, from around 1998 Photo: Jun Pino Photographer

Background information
- Origin: Detroit, Michigan, U.S.
- Genres: Garage rock, punk blues, blues-rock, alternative rock
- Years active: 1997–1999
- Label: Bloodshot
- Members: Jack White; Dan John Miller; Tracee Mae Miller; Damian Lang

Two-Star Tabernacle was a short-lived American punk rock band from Detroit. Two-Star Tabernacle consisted of Jack White, Dan John Miller, Tracee Mae Miller and Damian Lang.

The band's first release came in 1998, and was a 7-inch vinyl with Andre Williams released by Bloodshot Records initially as a limited edition of 500 on white vinyl, then an additional limited edition of 500 on black vinyl and The band's second release came in 2011, and was a 7-inch vinyl recorded around the same time as the first also featuring Andre Williams, released through Jack White's Third Man Records Vault Subscription Service. Several of the band's songs were altered and recorded on the White Stripes' album White Blood Cells and Blanche's album If We Can't Trust the Doctors...

== Bootlegs ==
There are only two heavily circulated bootlegs, but more are believed to exist. The most common was recorded at The Gold Dollar in Detroit, Michigan on January 16, 1998, and the rarer of the two was recorded at Paychecks in Hamtramck, Michigan, on March 12, 1999.

Live At The Gold Dollar set list

1. "Who's To Say"
2. "Itchy"
3. "Hotel Yorba"
4. "Worst Time Of My Life"
5. "Garbage Picker"
6. "Now Mary" (Early Version)
7. "Zig Zag Springs"
8. "Red Head"
9. "Jesus And Tequila"
10. "So Long Cruel World"
11. "Sixteen Tons"

Live At Paychecks set list

1. "Rank Stranger"
2. "The Union Forever"
3. "Who's To Say"
4. "The Same Boy You've Always Known"
5. "Zig Zag Springs"
6. "Rootin' Tootin'"
7. "Hotel Yorba"
8. "So Long, Cruel World"
9. "Plain As Day"
10. "Wayfarin' Stranger"
