= Jason Roberts (indie musician) =

American songwriter

Jason Eric Roberts is an American musician, activist, urban advocate and co-founder of the Dallas, Texas, organization Bike Friendly Oak Cliff. He is a songwriter and performer in Dallas-based indie pop band The Happy Bullets. He also co-founded the Oak Cliff non-profit art collaborative The Art Conspiracy, and indie record label Undeniable Records.

Roberts has a day job as a senior IT consultant, and has contributed feature and news stories for Entertainment Weekly, the Pittsburgh Post-Gazette, the Detroit Metro Times, the Dallas Observer, and D Magazine's Best of Dallas series.
