= Van Lear Rose =

Studio album by Loretta Lynn
- Released: April 27, 2004
- Recorded: c. January 2004
- Genre: Country
- Length: 39:00
- Label: Interscope
- Producer: Jack White

Loretta Lynn chronology
All Time Greatest Hits (2002)	Van Lear Rose (2004)	Full Circle (2016)

Singles from Van Lear Rose
- 1. "Miss Being Mrs." Released: April 2004; 2. "Portland Oregon" Released: May 3, 2004

Van Lear Rose is the forty-second solo studio album by American country music singer-songwriter Loretta Lynn. It was released on April 27, 2004, by Interscope Records. The album was produced by Jack White. The album was widely praised by critics, peaking at No. 2 on the US Billboard Top Country Albums chart and at No. 24 on the Billboard 200, the most successful crossover album of Lynn's 60-year career at that point. The track "Portland Oregon" was listed as the 305th best song of the 2000s by Pitchfork.

== Background ==
The album was initially intended as a musical experiment, blending the styles of Lynn and producer White. White also co-wrote one track, sings a duet with Lynn, and performs throughout the entire album as a musician. At the time of the album's release, Lynn was 72 and White was 28. The title refers to Lynn's origins as the daughter of a miner working the Van Lear coal mines.

== Critical reception ==
Professional ratings
Aggregate scores
Source	Rating
Metacritic	97/100
Review scores
Source	Rating
AllMusic	5/5 stars
Blender	5/5 stars
Entertainment Weekly	A
The Guardian	4/5 stars
Mojo	5/5 stars
Pitchfork	9.3/10
Q	4/5 stars
Rolling Stone	4/5 stars
Spin	A
Uncut	5/5 stars

The album was released to glowing reviews and universal acclaim. It received a rating of 97 at Metacritic, the fourth highest score ever and the second-highest for a female artist to date. Blender magazine called the album "Some of the most gripping singing you're going to hear all year .... A brave, unrepeatable record that speaks to her whole life." Stephen Thomas Erlewine of AllMusic said that "The brilliance of Van Lear Rose is not just how the two approaches complement each other, but how the record captures the essence of Loretta Lynn's music even as it has flourishes that are distinctly Jack." Rhapsody ranked the album No. 16 on its "Country’s Best Albums of the Decade" list.

== Commercial performance ==
The album debuted at No. 2 on the US Billboard Top Country Albums chart, and No. 24 on the US Billboard 200, selling 37,000 in its first week, the best sales week for Lynn in the Nielsen Soundscan era. It has sold over 233,000 copies in United States as of September 2004.

The album's first single, "Miss Being Mrs.", was released in April 2004 and did not chart. Its music video premiered on May 23. The second single, "Portland Oregon", was released in May and did not chart. Two music videos were shot for the single, the first one was filmed on May 18 and was not released. The second version premiered the week of October 25.

== Accolades ==
=== Grammy Awards ===
Year	Nominee / work	Award	Result
2005	Van Lear Rose	Best Country Album	Won
2005	"Portland Oregon"	Best Country Collaboration with Vocals	Won
2005	"Portland Oregon"	Best Country Song	Nominated
2005	"Miss Being Mrs."	Best Country Song	Nominated
2005	"Miss Being Mrs."	Best Female Country Vocal Performance	Nominated

=== Best-of lists ===
Publication	Accolade	Year	Rank
Pop Matters	The Best 100 Albums of the 2000s	2014	59
Rolling Stone	50 Country Albums Every Rock Fan Should Own	2015	12
CMT	CMT 40 Greatest Albums	Unknown	18
Country Universe	The 100 Greatest Albums of the Decade	2009	8
Country Universe	100 Greatest Contemporary Country Albums	2006	59
Paste Magazine	The 50 Best Albums of the Decade	2009	48
Rhapsody	Country's Best Albums of the Decade	2009	16

== Track listing ==
All tracks are written by Loretta Lynn, except where noted.

Original release (2004)
No.	Title	Writer(s)	Length
1.	"Van Lear Rose"		3:50
2.	"Portland Oregon" (duet with Jack White)		3:49
3.	"Trouble on the Line"	L. Lynn; Oliver Lynn	2:21
4.	"Family Tree"		3:03
5.	"Have Mercy"		2:35
6.	"High on a Mountain Top"		2:44
7.	"Little Red Shoes"	L. Lynn (lyrics); Jack White (music)	3:33
8.	"God Makes No Mistakes"		1:45
9.	"Women's Prison"		4:16
10.	"This Old House"		1:56
11.	"Mrs. Leroy Brown"		3:38
12.	"Miss Being Mrs."		2:50
13.	"Story of My Life"		2:40

Third Man Records Vault Edition bonus track (2015)
No.	Title	Length
14.	"Just to Have You Back"	3:32

== Personnel ==
- Loretta Lynn - lead vocals, acoustic guitar
- David Feeny - pedal steel guitar, Dobro, percussion, backing vocals
- Patrick Keeler - drums, percussion, backing vocals
- "Little" Jack Lawrence - bass guitar, percussion, backing vocals
- Dan John Miller - acoustic guitar, percussion, backing vocals
- Dirk Powell - fiddle, bowed bass, banjo
- Jack White - electric guitar, acoustic guitar, organ, piano, percussion, backing vocals, duet vocals on "Portland Oregon"

Technical

- Brendan Benson - engineer
- Eric McConnell - engineer
- Stuart Sikes - mixing
- Russ Harrington - photography

== Charts ==
=== Weekly charts ===
Chart (2004)	Peak position
Norwegian Albums (VG-lista)	32
Swedish Albums (Sverigetopplistan)	23
UK Country Albums (OCC)	1
US Billboard 200	24
US Top Country Albums (Billboard)	2
Scottish Albums (Official Charts)	92
Australian Country Albums (ARIA)	7

=== Year-end charts ===
Chart (2004)	Position
US Top Country Albums (Billboard)	49
Chart (2005)	Position
US Top Country Albums (Billboard)	71
