= Ben l'Oncle Soul (album) =

Studio album by Ben l'Oncle Soul
- Released: 17 May 2010
- Genre: Soul, pop
- Length: 55:20
- Language: English; French
- Label: Motown
- Producer: Guillaume Poncelet; Gabin Lesieur

Ben l'Oncle Soul chronology
Soul Wash: Lesson 1 (2009)	Ben l'Oncle Soul (2010)	Live Paris (2011)

Singles from Ben l'Oncle Soul
- 1. "Seven Nation Army" Released: 8 March 2010; 2. "Soulman" Released: 13 September 2010; 3. "Petite sœur" Released: 17 January 2011; 4. "Elle me dit" Released: 11 July 2011

Ben l'Oncle Soul is the debut album by French soul singer and songwriter Ben l'Oncle Soul. It was released by Motown Records in 2010. The album is performed in both the French and English language.

== Track listing ==
No.	Title	Writer(s)	Length
1.	"Seven Nation Army" (The White Stripes cover)	Jack White	2:59
2.	"Soulman"	Benjamin Duterde; Gabin Lesieur; Freddi Chellaoui	3:45
3.	"Petite sœur"	Duterde; Lesieur; Chellaoui	4:14
4.	"Mon amour"	Duterde; Yann Poirier	3:51
5.	"Elle me dit"	Duterde; Lesieur; Guillaume Poncelet; Chellaoui	4:06
6.	"I Don't Wanna Waste"	Duterde; Poncelet; Fanny Damiette	4:24
7.	"Come Home"	Duterde; Lesieur; Adam Turner	3:47
8.	"L'ombre d'un homme"	Duterde; Lesieur; Chellaoui; Jérémie Charbonnel	4:48
9.	"Ain't Off to the Back" (featuring Beat Assailant)	Duterde; Lesieur; Turner	3:51
10.	"Lise"	Duterde; Chellaoui; Christophe Charrier; Poirier	4:17
11.	"Demain j'arrête"	Duterde; Poncelet; Monsieur Maleek	3:07
12.	"Partir"	Duterde; Charrier; Charbonnel; Poirier	4:11
13.	"Lose It"	Duterde; Poncelet; Chellaoui; Turner	3:35
14.	"Back for You"	Duterde; Lesieur; Turner	4:48

== Charts ==
The album has charted in France and many other charts and was certified three times platinum in France.

=== Weekly charts ===
Chart (2010–2011)	Peak position
Belgian Albums (Ultratop Wallonia)	11
Dutch Albums (Album Top 100)	12
French Albums (SNEP)	4
German Albums (Offizielle Top 100)	81
Swiss Albums (Schweizer Hitparade)	37

=== Year-end charts ===
Chart (2010)	Position
Belgian Albums (Ultratop Wallonia)	51
French Albums (SNEP)	16

Chart (2011)	Position
Belgian Albums (Ultratop Wallonia)	44
French Albums (SNEP)	21
