= Guillaume Poncelet =

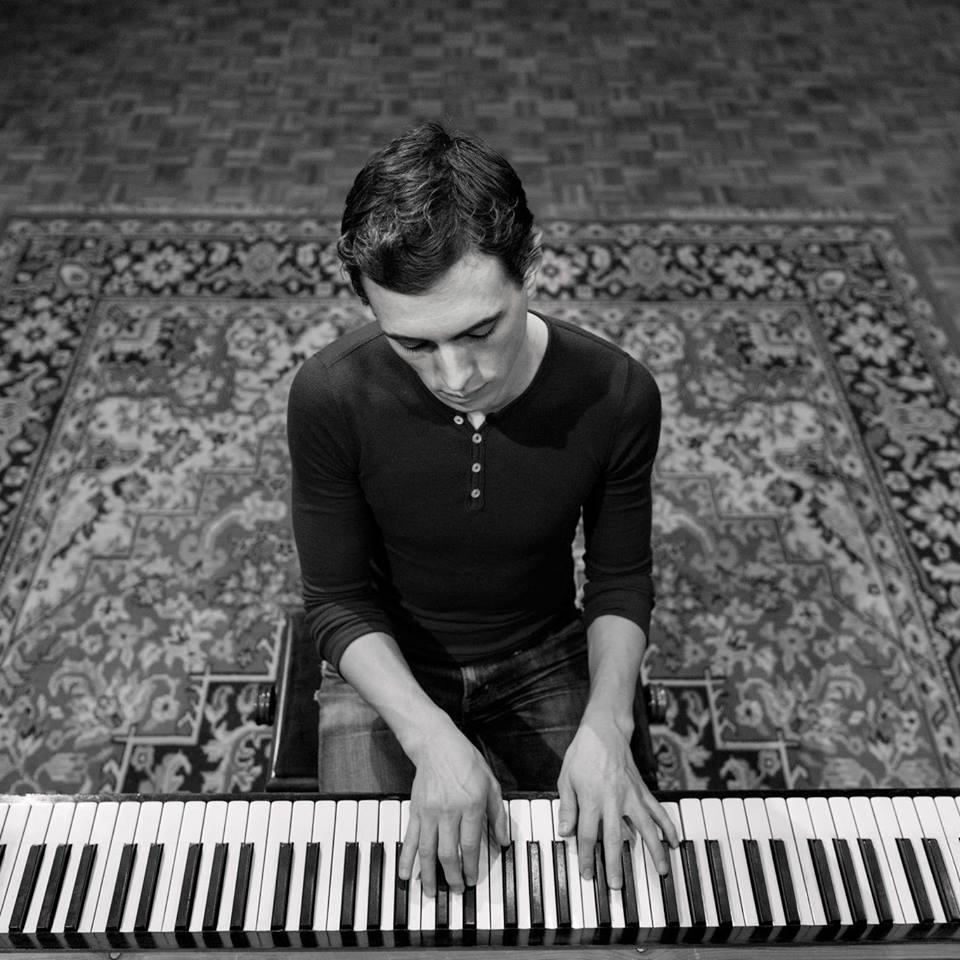

Background information
- Born: 1978 (age 47–48)
- Occupation: Musician
- Instruments: Trumpet, piano
- Website: http://guillaumeponcelet.fr

Guillaume Poncelet (born 1978) is a French musician, composer, trumpet and piano player, born in Grenoble, France.

As a composer, producer or musician, he collaborated with MC Solaar, C2C, Ben l'Oncle Soul, Oxmo Puccino, Sixun, Beat Assailant, Claude Nougaro, Stevie Wonder, Maurice White and Earth, Wind & Fire (within the band noJazz), Ousman Danedjo, Electro Deluxe, Dave, Michel Jonasz, Milk Coffee and Sugar, Gaël Faye, Ayo, Ben Mazué, Zaz and Joyce Jonathan.

== Biography ==
Guillaume Poncelet was born in Grenoble, France, to a writer and playwright father and a caregiver mother. At eight years of age, he attended the Regional Music Conservatory of Grenoble, where he was for nine years, while teaching himself to play the piano.

He then joined for four years the Jazz Department of the National School of Music (ENM) in Chambéry led by Pierre Drevet, with whom he studied trumpet, jazz harmony and arrangement techniques.

At 21, he was admitted to the National Conservatory of Music and Dance of Paris, which he left when noJazz invited him to join the band and tour in North America. Along with noJazz, he collaborated with prestigious artists such as Stevie Wonder and Maurice White (Earth, Wind & Fire).

== Career ==
Guillaume Poncelet founded the band Wise in 2004, with Julien Birot and Robin Notte. They released a first album on Naïve Jazz.

In 2004, he produced the album Mes Couleurs by Freddy for the record label Such.

In 2006, he meets Michel Jonasz. Their collaboration leads to the production and arrangement work by Guillaume Poncelet on 2 albums : Chanson française and Les Hommes Sont Toujours Des Enfants.

Guillaume is also the musical director, trumpet player and pianist for Michel Jonasz until 2013.

In 2009, he joins the French National Jazz Orchestra, led by Daniel Yvinec, as keyboards and trumpet player. Within this project, he will record 2 albums including John Hollenbeck's Shut Up and Dance, nominated at 54th Grammy Awards in 2012 for Best Instrumental Composition.

He meets Benjamin Duterde in 2008, also known as Ben L’Oncle Soul for whom he produces the eponymous album that was certified 3 times platinum in France.

For the record label M6 Music, he produces Dave's Blue Eyes Soul.

In 2008, he meets Gaël Faye and collaborates with his duo Milk Coffee and Sugar (Gaël Faye and Edgard Sekloka). He then produces Gaël Faye's solo album Pili Pili sur un Croissant au Beurre, released in 2013 under Motown France.

In 2013, he tours with Ayo.

In 2014, he devotes himself to writing his upright piano solo album 88.

In 2015 he tours with Zaz.

In 2016, he writes and produces 5 tracks for Gaël Faye's EP Rythmes et Botanique.

In 2017, he tours with Gaël Faye. He also co-produce, with Marlon B, Ben Mazué's album La Femme Idéale.

He plays his first introductory concert for his album 88 at the Studio Davout in Paris, with guests Gaël Faye, Thomas Azier, Ben Mazué, Malvina Meinier, Christophe Panzani, Renaud Gensane and Contraste Ensemble. The performance is recorded and filmed by Loïc Guilpain.

In 2018, he releases his solo album 88 on January 19, under his own label Blend. The album includes 2 bonus tracks with Gaël Faye (Mon Terroir) and Thomas Azier (Last Breath).

He composes music for the original soundtrack of the feature film Razzia, directed by Nabil Ayouch.

== Selected discography ==
- Wise - Electrology (composition, arrangements, trumpet, keyboards)
- NoJazz - Have Fun (composition, arrangements, programming, trumpet, keyboards)
- Nojazz - No Limits (trumpet, keyboards, arrangements, remix "What time is it" feat. Ousman Danedjo)
- Nojazz - Zooland (composition, arrangements, trumpet, keyboards)
- Orchestre National de Jazz - Around Robert Wyatt (trumpet, keyboards)
- Orchestre National de Jazz -Shut Up And Dance (trumpet, keyboards)
- Ben l'Oncle Soul - Soul Wash (trumpet, horns arrangements)
- Ben l'Oncle Soul - Ben l'Oncle Soul (production, arrangements, composition, trumpet, keyboards)
- Dave - Blue Eyed Soul (production and arrangements, trumpet, keyboards)
- Gaël Faye - Pili-Pili sur un croissant au beurre (production, arrangements, composition, trumpet, keyboards)
- Milk Coffee & Sugar - Milk Coffee & Sugar (composition, trumpet, keyboards)
- Electro Deluxe - Stardown (trumpet, keyboards, composition, arrangements)
- Electro Deluxe - Hopeful (trumpet, keyboards, composition, arrangements)
- Electro Deluxe - Play (musical director, trumpet, keyboards, composition, arrangements)
- Freddy - Mes Couleurs (production, arrangements, composition, trumpet, keyboards, programming)
- Michel Jonasz - Chanson Française (production, arrangements, keyboards, trumpet)
- Michel Jonasz - Les Hommes Sont Toujours des Enfants (production, arrangements, keyboards, trumpet)
- Michel Jonasz Trio - Live au Casino de Paris (musical director, keyboards, trumpet, arrangements)
- Michel Jonasz - Les Hommes sont Toujours des Enfants live au Casino de Paris (musical director, keyboards, trumpet, arrangements)
- MC Solaar - Chapitre 7 (trumpet)
- Hocus Pocus - Place 54 (keyboards, trumpet, arrangements)
- Hocus Pocus - 16 Pièces (keyboards, trumpet, arrangements)
- C2C - Tetra (keyboards, trumpet)
- Gaël Faye - Rythmes & Botanique (composition, production, keyboards, trumpet)
- Ben Mazué - La femme idéale (production, arrangements, co-composition, keyboards, trumpet)
- Guillaume Poncelet - 88 (composition, production)
- Gaël Faye - Des Fleurs (composition, production)
- Ben Mazué - Paradis (composition, production)
- Gaël Faye - Lundi Méchant (composition, production)
- Guillaume Poncelet - Haven (composition, production)
- Gaël Faye - Mauve Jacaranda (composition, production)
- Grand Corps Malade, Ben Mazué, Gaël Faye - Ephémère (composition, production)
- Guillaume Poncelet - Durango (composition, production)

== Awards and nominations ==
Award Ceremony	Year	Nominee/Work	Category	Result
Berlin Music Video Awards	2024	Yaki imo	Best Performer	Win
