= Seven Nation Army =

2003 single by the White Stripes

Single by the White Stripes

from the album Elephant
- B-side: "Good to Me"
- Released: February 17, 2003
- Recorded: April–May 2002
- Studio: Toe Rag (London, England)
- Genre: Blues rock; alternative rock; garage rock; punk blues
- Length: 3:52
- Label: V2; XL; Third Man
- Composers: Jack White; Meg White
- Lyricist: Jack White
- Producer: Jack White

The White Stripes singles chronology
"Candy Cane Children" (2002)	"Seven Nation Army" (2003)	"The Hardest Button to Button" (2003)

Music video
- "Seven Nation Army" on YouTube

"Seven Nation Army" is a song by the American rock duo the White Stripes, released by V2 Records and XL Recordings on February 17, 2003. The lead single from their fourth studio album, Elephant (2003), the song was written by Jack White and composed by the band. It consists of distorted vocals, a minimal drumbeat, and a bass line created by playing a guitar through a pitch shift effect.

"Seven Nation Army" peaked at 76 on the US Billboard Hot 100, the band's first entry on the chart; it also charted in other countries and received several platinum certifications. The song received widespread acclaim from critics, who praised its distinctive riff and drumbeat. It won Best Rock Song at the 46th Annual Grammy Awards and a music video for the song directed by Alex and Martin won Best Editing in a Video at the 2003 MTV Video Music Awards. Its success contributed to the garage rock revival, and the song appears on several professional listicles of the best songs of all time.

"Seven Nation Army" achieved lasting commercial success and has been called "arguably....the world's most popular sports anthem". It is commonly played at sporting events, sung by fans, and has served as a theme song for sports teams, personalities, and events, including the 2018 FIFA World Cup. The song has appeared in various media and has been used in political events in the United Kingdom, particularly as a chant sung by audiences. Various artists have covered "Seven Nation Army", including Ben l'Oncle Soul and Marcus Collins, whose covers reached charts in multiple countries. Third Man Records reissued the single in 2014 and 2015.

== Recording ==
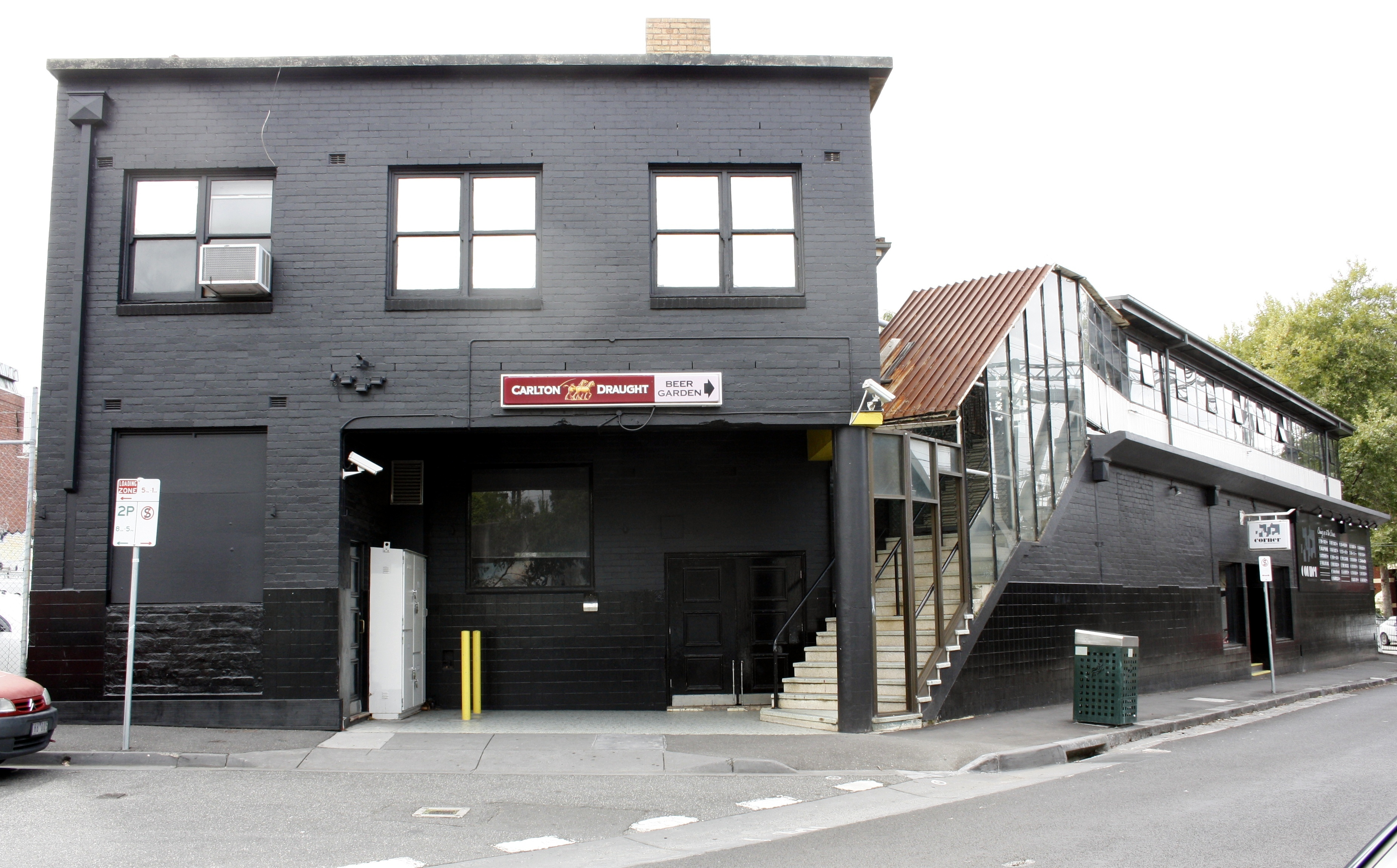
The "Seven Nation Army" riff was composed at the Corner Hotel.

"Seven Nation Army" began with a guitar riff devised by singer and guitarist Jack White at the Corner Hotel in Melbourne, while the White Stripes were on the Australian leg of their tour on January 29, 2002. He showed the riff to Ben Swank, an executive with the White Stripes' record label Third Man, who felt Jack could "do better". Jack later recalled that Swank "didn't even think that rhythm was that great, either".

Originally saving the riff for a potential James Bond theme, he decided to incorporate it into a White Stripes song after admitting how slim his chances were of ever being asked to create a Bond theme. Five years later, however, he wrote and performed "Another Way to Die" with Alicia Keys as the theme for the 2008 Bond film Quantum of Solace.

"Seven Nation Army" was produced by Jack and recorded at Toe Rag Studios in London's Hackney area. He wrote the song as a "little experiment", hoping to create a compelling song that did not include a chorus. The lyrics were written the night before the song was recorded. The title "Seven Nation Army" was initially used as a placeholder for the track before its lyrics were written, but the name ultimately stuck.

== Composition ==
"Seven Nation Army"
15-second sample featuring the song's driving riff, drumbeat, and opening lyrics

"Seven Nation Army" is characterized as an alternative rock, garage rock, blues rock and punk blues song with a length of three minutes and 52 seconds. According to sheet music published by Universal Music Publishing Group, it is composed in the key of E minor in common time with a tempo of 120 beats per minute. The title of the song comes from when Jack, as a young child in Detroit, misheard "The Salvation Army" as "The Seven Nation Army".

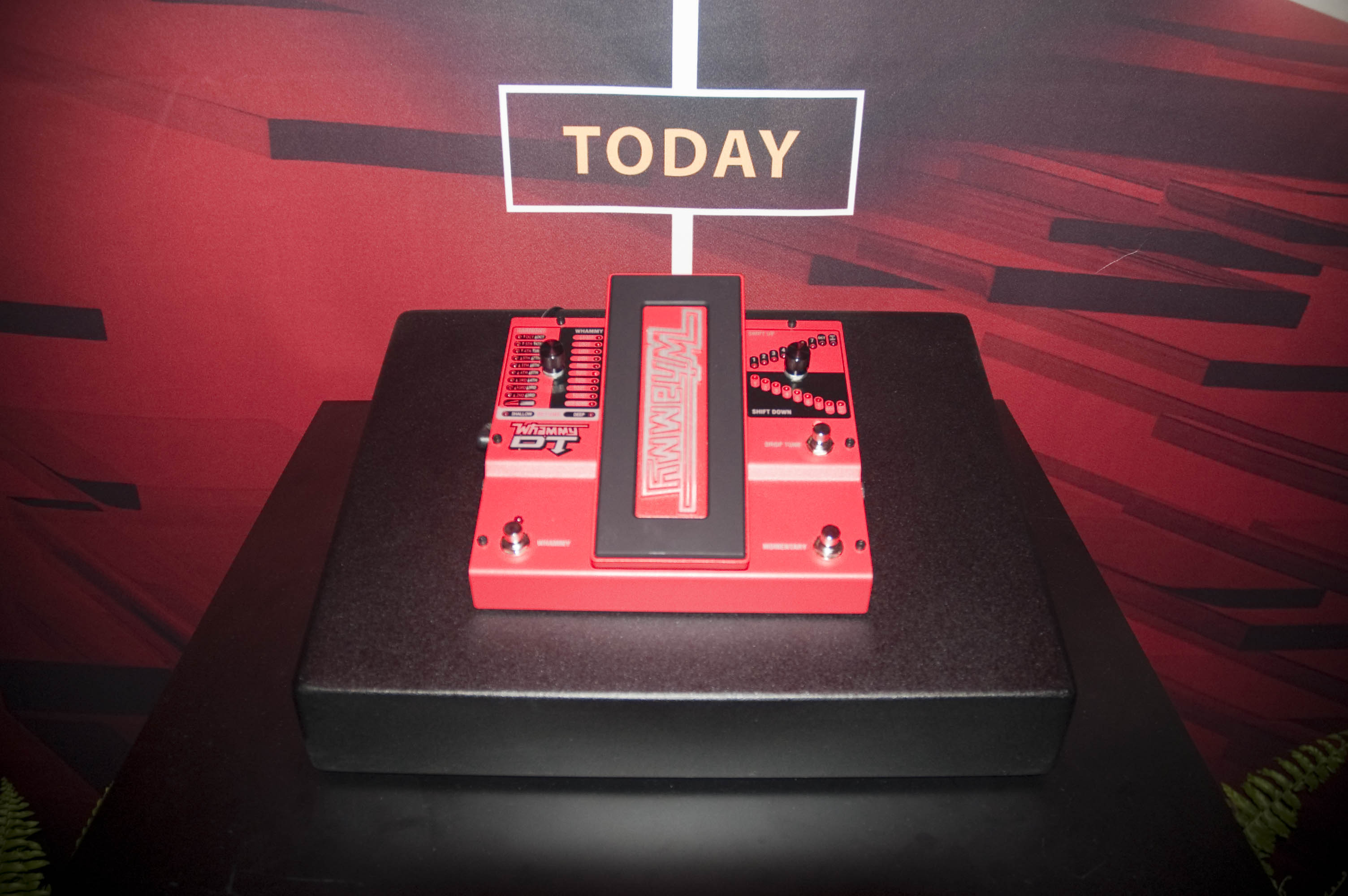
A DigiTech Whammy was used to create the bass-like sound heard in the driving riff.

The song is driven by a riff that resembles the sound of a bass guitar. To create this sound, Jack connected a semi-acoustic guitar to a DigiTech Whammy pedal (a pitch shift effect), lowering the pitch by an octave. The riff uses five pitches and consists of seven notes; it begins with a held note followed by four syncopated notes, ending with two notes that appear frequently in laments. The 7-note riff of "Seven Nation Army" has been noted to be similar to the main theme (movements 1 and 4) of Bruckner's 5th symphony. The song also features distorted vocals and a "heartbeat drum", played by White Stripes drummer Meg White. AllMusic's Tom Maginnis noted that the song "manipulat[es] the power of tension and release": it creates a sense of "anticipatory energy", then transitions into what Maginnis described as a "[wordless] crush of what stands for the chorus", consisting of an electric guitar and a "bashing crash cymbal".

John Mulvey of NME described "Seven Nation Army" as a "diatribe against fame". The song's lyrics were inspired by the growing attention received by the White Stripes. According to Jack, the song tells the story of a person who, upon entering a town, hears its residents gossiping about him and proceeds to leave the town in response. Driven by a sense of loneliness, he ultimately returns. Regarding the song's meaning, Jack stated, "The song's about gossip. It's about me, Meg and the people we're dating." Maginnis described the lyrics as presenting an "obstinate attitude", citing the first verse: "I'm gonna fight 'em off / A seven nation army couldn't hold me back / They're gonna rip it off / Taking their time right behind my back". The lyric was originally "I'm gonna back it up." In regards to the line "I'm going to Wichita / Far from this opera forevermore", Jack said he has never visited the city, but was using it as metaphor and getting himself into character for the song with the lyric.

== Release ==
Jack's idea of releasing "Seven Nation Army" as a single faced opposition from the White Stripes' record label, XL Recordings, which wanted to release the song "There's No Home for You Here" instead. Jack persuaded the label to release "Seven Nation Army", and in 2003 it was released as a promotional single alongside Elephant track "In the Cold, Cold Night". It was subsequently released in 2013 as a 7-inch vinyl single and a CD single; the former included a cover of "Good to Me"—written by Brendan Benson and Jason Falkner—as its B-side, while the latter included both "Good to Me" and folk song "Black Jack Davey". The photograph used as the single's artwork was taken by Patrick Pantano; it includes an elephant painting made by Greg Siemasz.

On January 3, 2014, Third Man Records announced a limited-edition clear 7-inch vinyl reissue of "Seven Nation Army" as part of a package for subscribers to its Vault service. A black 7-inch vinyl reissue with updated artwork was released on February 27, 2015.

== Music video ==
The video was originally planned to be directed by Jim Jarmusch but by the time the song reached the radio it had not come to pass and was instead directed by French duo Alex and Martin. The video consists of one seemingly continuous shot through a kaleidoscopic tunnel of mirrored black, white and red triangles. The triangle slides, which represent the Holy Spirit, alternate between images of Jack or Meg playing, interspersed with marching skeletons and an elephant, referring to the name of the album the song appeared on. The triangles move forward through the tunnel faster and slower in tandem with the dynamics of the song. When the song begins to intensify, the lights surrounding the triangles flash and other effects build up as well. Because Meg's left wrist was broken at the time, her rack tom is positioned to obscure it for the majority of the video (although in some side shots her cast is visible).

The music video won Best Editing in a Video at the 2003 MTV Video Music Awards, and was nominated for Best Group Video, Best Rock Video, and Best Special Effects.

== Critical reception ==
"Seven Nation Army" received widespread critical acclaim. Heather Phares of AllMusic described it as a "breathtaking opener" to the album Elephant, and Bram Teltelman of Billboard suggested that "adventurous rock programmers might want to join the 'Army'". In particular, "Seven Nation Army"'s central riff has been the subject of praise since the song's release. A writer for Rolling Stone described it as the best riff of the 2000s decade, and Rebecca Schiller of NME wrote that the riff is "the most maddeningly compulsive bassline of the decade, and not even actually played on a bass guitar". Critics also praised Meg's drumming—a "hypnotic thud" according to Tom Maginnis of AllMusic. Teltelman described the drumming as "simple but effective", and Phares said it was "explosively minimal". Critics also distinguished the song from the White Stripes' other work. According to Teltelman, "Seven Nation Army" represented an effort to "defy categorization", especially the garage rock label that had been attributed to the band. He further wrote that it was "much more of a straightforward rock song" than the band's 2002 single "Fell in Love with a Girl". Phares found "Seven Nation Army" to "deliver some of the fiercest blues-punk" of any song by the White Stripes.

"Seven Nation Army" won the Grammy Award for Best Rock Song at the 46th Annual Grammy Awards in addition to being nominated for Best Rock Performance by a Duo or Group with Vocal. In 2003, it was ranked number three on Pazz & Jop based on music critics' votes, and listed as the number-one song of the year on the 2003 KROQ Top 106.7. Consequence of Sound, Paste and Stereogum all named "Seven Nation Army" as the White Stripes' best song. Critics ranked "Seven Nation Army" among the best tracks of the 2000s decade; it appeared on NME's, Rolling Stone's, WFNX's, and Pitchfork's retrospective lists, and it was placed at number one on Consequence of Sound's "Top 50 Songs of the Decade".

== Commercial performance ==
On March 8, 2003, "Seven Nation Army" debuted at number 27 on the Billboard Modern Rock chart; (Note: Billboard's Modern Rock chart is now known as Alternative Songs, a name it adopted in 2009.) on July 26, it peaked at number one, a position it maintained for three weeks. In late 2023, for the chart's 35th anniversary, Billboard ranked the song as the 80th most successful in the chart's history. The song entered the Billboard Hot 100 chart on May 24, peaking at 76 that week. It debuted at number 38 on Billboard's Mainstream rock chart on July 12, and it reached its peak position of 12 on November 8. In Canada it peaked at number 61 on the Canadian Singles Chart in July 2007. The song debuted on the UK Singles Chart on May 3, 2003, at number seven, its peak position. It also reached the UK Indie Chart and Scottish Singles Chart the same week. The song debuted on the former at number one and remained at that position for another week, and it debuted and peaked at number six on the latter. On May 1, it debuted on the Irish Singles Chart, where it peaked at number 22. On June 22, the song debuted on the Australian Singles Chart at its peak position of number 17. It debuted on the Official German Charts at number 69 on June 27; it peaked at number four two weeks later.

"Seven Nation Army" has continued to chart intermittently years after its release. The song debuted at number four on the Federation of the Italian Music Industry (FIMI) chart on July 27, 2006, and it peaked at number three a week later. On June 29, 2008, it debuted at number 18 on the Swiss Hitparade chart, where it ultimately peaked at number four; it reentered this chart several times afterward, most recently in 2013. The song debuted at number 23 on the Ö3 Austria Top 40 chart on July 4, 2008, and it peaked at number 18 the next week; it later entered the Ö3 Austria Top 75 chart for one week on February 3, 2012. The song also entered the French Singles Chart on multiple occasions from 2013 to 2018, peaking at number 48 on February 23, 2013. It debuted on the Billboard Hot Rock Songs chart on January 18, 2014, peaking at number 12 during its first week.

The song was awarded several certifications in the 2010s. It was certified gold by Germany's Federal Music Industry Association in 2010, indicating over 150,000 sales of the single. In 2013, the British Phonographic Industry awarded "Seven Nation Army" a silver certification; after receiving a gold certification two years later, the song was certified double platinum in 2019 for sales and streams of over 1.2 million. The song was certified gold by the FIMI in 2014; three years later, it received a platinum certification, having sold over 50,000 copies.

== Legacy ==
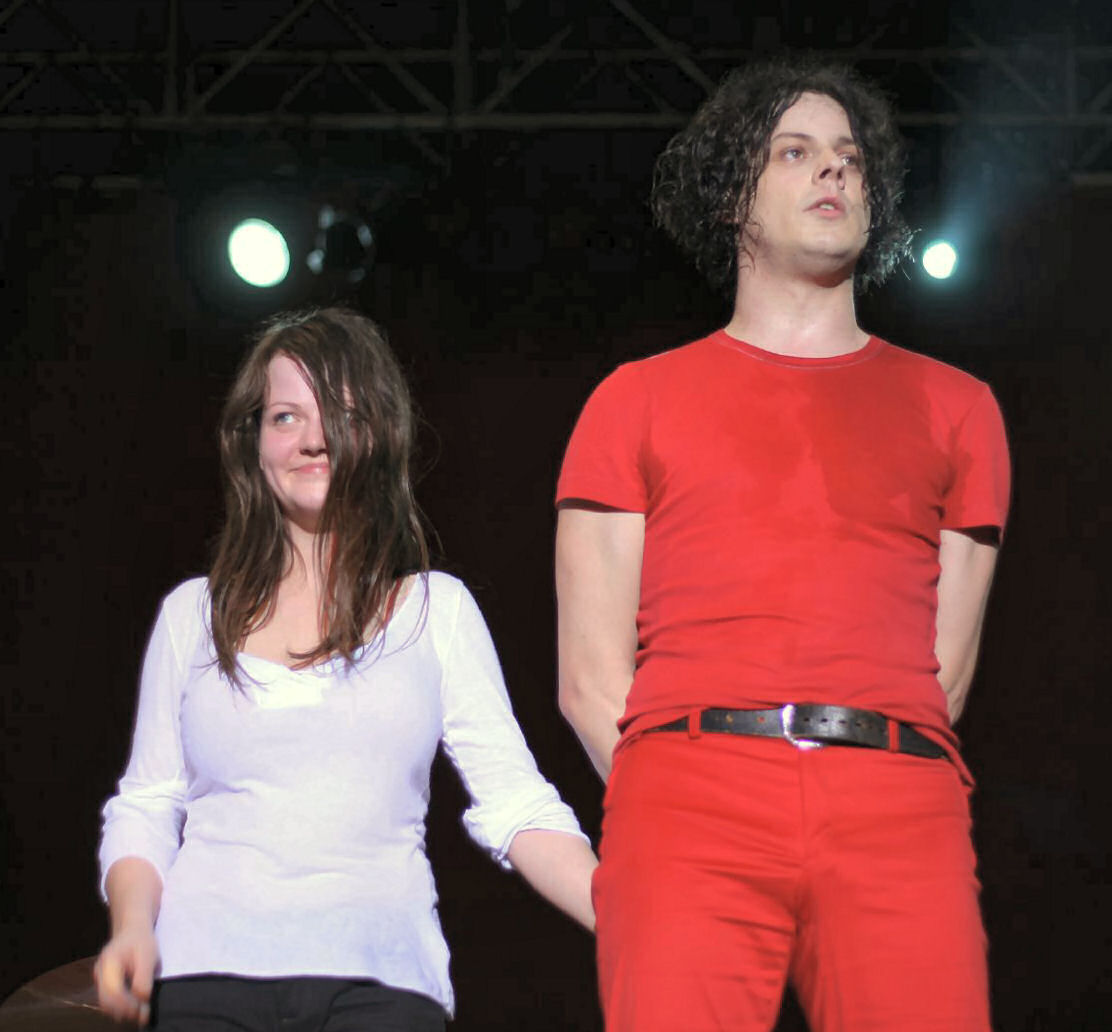
"Seven Nation Army" played a significant role in the popularity of the White Stripes. Pictured are band members Meg (left) and Jack White (right) in 2007.

"Seven Nation Army" boosted the White Stripes' popularity. A writer for Rolling Stone described it as a "career-changing hit", and NME's Daniel Martin viewed the song as the White Stripes' "defining tune", having sparked the band's transition "from their garage rock beginnings to an entirely new level of acclaim". In addition, "Seven Nation Army" contributed to the garage rock revival movement, becoming the first song in the genre to reach number one on Billboard's Modern Rock chart. After its initial run on music charts, the song—especially its riff—grew in popularity as a result of its usage in sports. In 2012, Deadspin's Alan Siegel described the "riff-turned-anthem" as "ubiquitous", and according to The New Yorker's Alec Wilkinson, the riff "might be the second-best-known guitar phrase in popular music, after the one from 'Satisfaction'". Erik Adams of The A.V. Club attributed the song's popularity to its riff's "simplicity"—a characteristic that he remarked makes the song "instantly familiar" and "instantly memorized"—and Nate Sloan said that the four notes following the riff's first note create a feeling of "urgency that makes [the riff] much more memorable".

In March 2005, Q magazine ranked "Seven Nation Army" eighth in its list of the 100 Greatest Guitar Tracks. It was also called the 75th greatest hard rock song by VH1. In May 2008, Rolling Stone placed the song at number 21 in its list of the 100 Greatest Guitar Songs of All Time. That same year, it appeared on Triple J's greatest songs ranking based on audience votes. Rolling Stone placed the song at 286 on their list of "500 Greatest Songs of All Time" list in 2010; it was re-ranked it at number 36 in its 2021 revision. Loudwire ranked it seventh on their 2012 list of the "Top 21st Century Hard Rock Songs". Listeners ranked the song number six on BBC Radio 6 Music's "Top 100 Greatest Hits" in 2015 after being presented with an unranked best songs list that the station had created. In 2018, Rolling Stone polled artists, critics and industry insiders in 2018 to create a list of the 100 greatest songs of the 21st century, and the song was placed at No. 3. The publication ranked "Seven Nation Army" at number four on their 2025 list of the "250 Greatest Songs of the 21st Century So Far". The Guardian included "Seven Nation Army" on their list of defining events in popular culture of the 21st century.

=== Sporting events ===
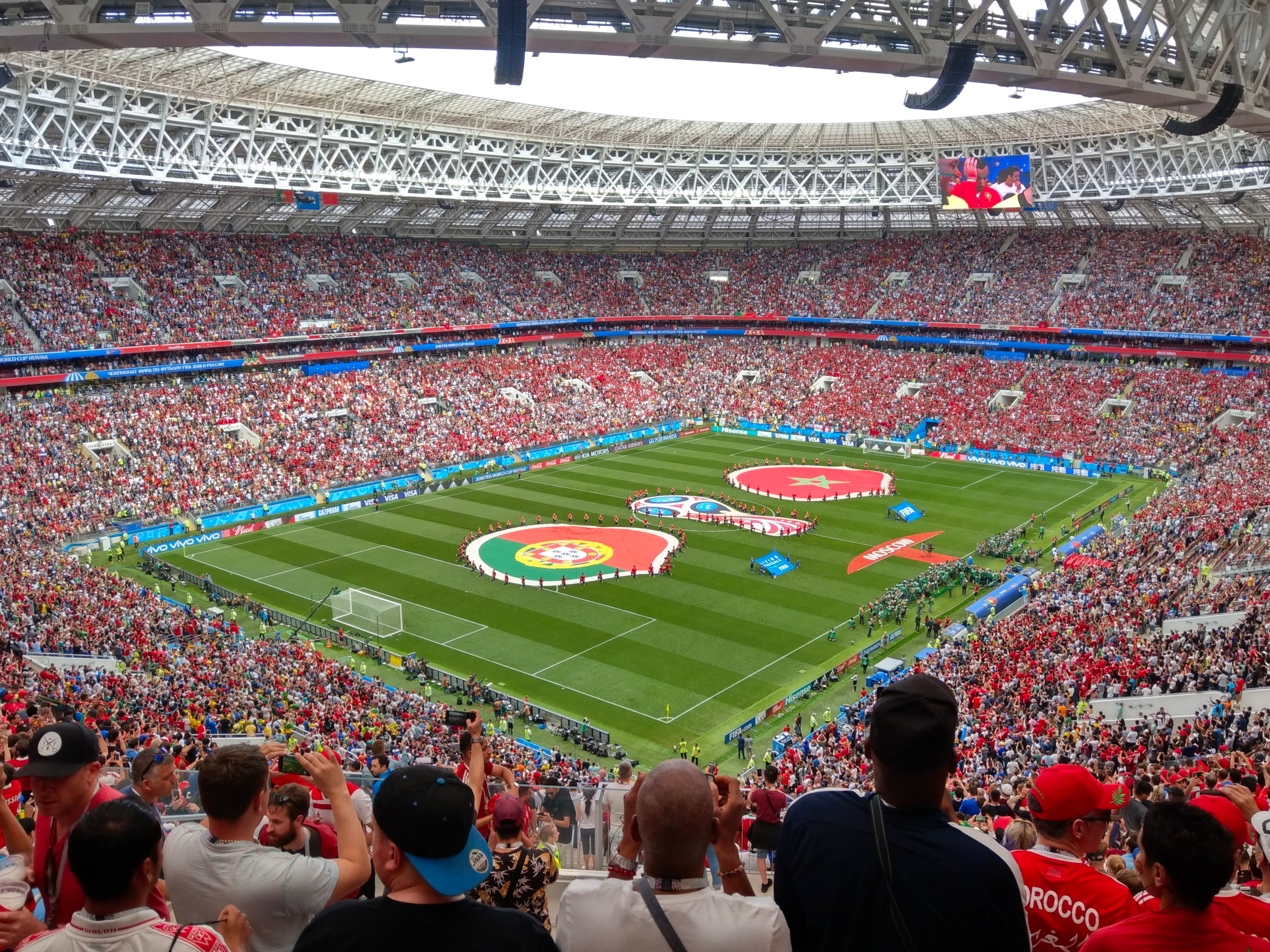
"Seven Nation Army" was played before each game at the 2018 FIFA World Cup.

According to Alan Siegel of Deadspin, the riff from "Seven Nation Army" is "an organic part of sports culture". The riff is commonly used in sports audience's chants, in which each note is usually sung using the "oh" sound. This phenomenon has its roots in a UEFA Champions League football match in Italy in October 2003, during which fans of Belgium's Club Brugge began singing the riff in a game against Italy's AC Milan. They continued the chant after Club Brugge striker Andrés Mendoza scored a goal. Club Brugge won the game, and the song subsequently became the team's "unofficial sports anthem".

After AS Roma won against Club Brugge in Belgium in 2006, fans of the former team began to use the riff as a chant, having learned it from the latter. Fans of the Italy national football team proceeded to chant the riff at games leading up to the 2006 FIFA World Cup, and "Seven Nation Army"—known as the "po po po po po" song among Italians—became the team's "unofficial theme". After Italy won the 2006 FIFA World Cup final, the riff was sung in Rome's streets. Regarding the song's popularity in Italy, Jack said:

I am honored that the Italians have adopted this song as their own. Nothing is more beautiful in music than when people embrace a melody and allow it to enter the pantheon of folk music.

The song's usage has since expanded into various other sports settings. By 2007, audiences at the Penn State Nittany Lions' American football games had begun chanting the riff in support of the team; before that the Buffalo Bills had used it as their kickoff song, since then, other American football audiences have chanted the riff as well. Meanwhile, Arrangers' Publishing Company began publishing marching band arrangements of "Seven Nation Army", and the song has since been played by marching bands at various colleges, including Ohio State University (especially at the beginning of their football games), Boston College, and the University of Southern California. The song has been chanted by NFL fans and played by NBA and NHL teams, and it was once chanted by Formula One racing driver Nico Rosberg. Audiences often replace the "oh"s in the chant with the names of members of sports teams, as with Kevin De Bruyne of Manchester City, Thiago Silva of Chelsea, Maximiliano Moralez and Andrea Pirlo of New York City FC, Santi Cazorla, formerly of Arsenal, and Divock Origi of Liverpool.

"Seven Nation Army" has served as an official anthem at various sporting events; NPR's Rick Karr remarked that the song is "arguably... the world's most popular sports anthem". It has been played at each UEFA European Football Championship since 2008, and it was played prior to the start of each game during the 2018 FIFA World Cup. Karr estimated that the song has reached "hundreds of millions of television viewers around the world" as a result of its usage in the latter tournament. Multiple sports teams and personalities have also used "Seven Nation Army" as their official song or walkout music, including boxers Gennady Golovkin and Anthony Joshua, American football teams the Baltimore Ravens, the Buffalo Bills (specifically when Buffalo kicks off to the opposing team) and the Detroit Lions, ice hockey team the New Jersey Devils, baseball team the Baltimore Orioles, and 3 time darts world champion Michael van Gerwen. The song is also played at the home games of A-League Men team Melbourne Victory following a team goal; coincidentally, the team plays at AAMI Park – located only 2,300 feet (700 m) from the Corner Hotel, where the riff was originally composed. WWE commentator Pat McAfee used the song as an entrance theme, including for his match against Austin Theory at WrestleMania 38. The song is also played at home games of the NBA team Miami Heat especially as the intro for the starting lineup and intro video, even to this day. Czechia used the song as a goal song during the 2026 FIFA World Cup. "Seven Nation Army" was covered by Gustavo Dudamel, New York Philharmonic, Simón Bolívar Symphony Orchestra, Bijan Mortazavi and Electric Mayhem during the 2026 FIFA World Cup final halftime show at MetLife Stadium in East Rutherford, New Jersey.

=== Use in politics ===
In 2016, the White Stripes stated via Facebook that they were "disgusted" by the song's appearance in a video supporting Donald Trump's campaign for the 2016 United States presidential election, and they said that they "[had] nothing whatsoever to do with [the] video". Matthew Strauss of Pitchfork was unable to ascertain which video had prompted the post, though he mentioned a fan-made video that "featur[ed] Trump imagery and audio of his speech at the Republican convention, set to 'Seven Nation Army'". This use of Donald Trump in music inspired British composer Ben Comeau to write, in the style of J. S. Bach, a four-part fugue on the riff of "Seven Nation Army" to the words "Donald Trump is a wanker."

"Seven Nation Army" made multiple appearances at events leading up to the 2017 United Kingdom general election. Following a May 2017 speech by then-Labour leader Jeremy Corbyn at the Wirral Live music festival at Prenton Park in Birkenhead, Merseyside, supporters in the audience began to chant "Oh, Jeremy Corbyn" to the tune of the song's riff. This chant was repeated on several occasions in the run-up to the election and afterwards at the 2017 Glastonbury Festival, where Corbyn appeared on the Pyramid stage to introduce Run the Jewels. As a result of the chant's appearance at the Glastonbury Festival, "Seven Nation Army" saw a 16,893% increase in streams, according to music streaming website Deezer.

Names of other politicians, including Labour politician Rebecca Long-Bailey and Conservative politician David Davis, were also chanted to the tune of the song's riff during conferences held for the election. At a People's Assembly protest on July 1, 2017, rock band Wolf Alice performed the song. Corbyn's name was again widely chanted throughout football games and public gatherings in the run-up to the 2019 general election.

The tune of the song's riff became one of the hallmarks of the 2023 anti-reform protests in Israel, sung to the words "Demokratia o mered” (Democracy or rebellion)".

The song has also been parodied by critics of UK Prime Minister Keir Starmer, with the line "Keir Starmer's a wanker" often chanted at darts tournaments, football matches and also at public protests and rallies.

=== In other media ===
The song has also appeared in various other media. On May 9, 2014, during the celebration of the 825th Hamburg Port Anniversary, "Seven Nation Army" was played using the horns of cruise ship MSC Magnifica as it entered the harbor. An instrumental cover of the song arranged by Ramin Djawadi was included in a 2018 episode of HBO television series Westworld. The song was performed during the final task of The Amazing Race 31 at Hart Plaza in Detroit.

== Track listings ==
7" promo

1. "Seven Nation Army" – 3:52
2. "In the Cold, Cold Night" – 2:58

7" reissue

1. "Seven Nation Army" – 3:52
2. "Good to Me" (Brendan Benson/Jason Falkner) – 2:06

CD

1. "Seven Nation Army" – 3:52
2. "Good to Me" (Brendan Benson/Jason Falkner) – 2:06
3. "Black Jack Davey" (Traditional) – 5:06

== Personnel ==
Credits are adapted from the 2013 vinyl reissue.

The White Stripes

- Jack White – vocals, guitar, slide guitar, mixing, production
- Meg White – drums

Additional personnel

- Liam Watson – mixing
- Noel – mastering

== Charts ==
=== Weekly charts ===
Chart (2003–2008)	Peak position
Australia (ARIA)	17
Austria (Ö3 Austria Top 40)	18
Canada (Nielsen SoundScan)	61
Germany (GfK)	4
Ireland (IRMA)	22
Italy (FIMI)	3
Netherlands (Dutch Top 40)	22
Netherlands (Single Top 100)	42
Scottish Singles Sales (Official Charts)	6
Switzerland (Schweizer Hitparade)	3
UK Singles (Official Charts)	7
UK Independent (Official Charts)	1
US Billboard Hot 100	76
US Alternative Airplay (Billboard)	1
US Mainstream Rock Airplay (Billboard)	12

Chart (2013–2014)	Peak position
France (SNEP)	48
US Hot Rock & Alternative Songs (Billboard)	12

Chart (2024)	Peak position
Global 200 (Billboard)	181

=== Year-end charts ===
Chart (2003)	Position
Colombia (B & V Marketing)	4
US Modern Rock (Billboard)	2

Chart (2006)	Position
Italy (FIMI)	24

Chart (2008)	Position
Germany (Official German Charts)	58
Switzerland (Schweizer Hitparade)	68

== Certifications ==
Region	Certification	Certified units/sales
Australia (ARIA)	4× Platinum	280,000^{‡}
Belgium (BRMA)	Platinum	40,000^{‡}
Canada (Music Canada)	9× Platinum	720,000^{‡}
Denmark (IFPI Danmark)	Platinum	90,000^{‡}
France (SNEP) The Glitch Mob Remix	Diamond	333,333^{‡}
Germany (BVMI)	5× Gold	750,000^{‡}
Italy (FIMI)	2× Platinum	200,000^{‡}
New Zealand (RMNZ)	7× Platinum	210,000^{‡}
Spain (Promusicae)	2× Platinum	120,000^{‡}
United Kingdom (BPI)	5× Platinum	3,000,000^{‡}
United States (RIAA)	2× Platinum	2,000,000^{‡}
^{‡} Sales+streaming figures based on certification alone.

== Release history ==
Region	Date	Formats	Label	Ref.
United States	February 17, 2003	Alternative radio	V2	
United Kingdom	April 21, 2003	7-inch vinyl; CD	XL	
Australia	April 28, 2003	7-inch vinyl; CD	XL	

== Glitch Mob version ==
The song has been remixed by the Glitch Mob, which was used in the first trailer for the 2016 video game Battlefield 1.

The Glitch Mob remix of the song appears as a playable track in Guitar Hero: Warriors of Rock and in Guitar Hero Live's online GHTV mode. In 2016, video game company EA used the Glitch Mob remix of the song in a trailer advertising Battlefield 1. A surge in streams and digital sales of the White Stripes' version of "Seven Nation Army" followed the release of the trailer: within two weeks, the total number of streams and digital purchases of the song increased by 146 percent and 332 percent, respectively.

=== Weekly charts ===
Chart (2021)	Peak position
US Hot Dance/Electronic Songs (Billboard)	34

=== Year-end charts ===
Chart (2021)	Position
US Hot Dance/Electronic Songs (Billboard)	85

== Ben l'Oncle Soul version ==
"Seven Nation Army"

Single by Ben l'Oncle Soul

from the EP Soul Wash: Lesson 1 and the album Ben l'Oncle Soul
- Released: March 8, 2010
- Length: 2:57
- Label: Motown
- Songwriter: Jack White
- Producers: Guillaume Poncelet; Gabin Lesieur

Ben l'Oncle Soul singles chronology
"À mi-chemin" (2010)	"Seven Nation Army" (2010)	"Soulman" (2010)

Music video
- "Seven Nation Army" on YouTube

French soul singer Ben l'Oncle Soul covered the song on his debut EP Soul Wash: Lesson 1 (2009) and subsequently appeared on his self-titled debut album (2010). It was later released as a single, promotionally on March 8, 2010, and commercially on September 24, 2010, and was a commercial success in multiple countries, peaking at number 16 on the Belgium Ultratop Charts for Wallonia and charting in Germany, the Netherlands, and Switzerland.

=== Charts ===
Chart (2011)	Peak position
Belgium (Ultratop 50 Wallonia)	16
Germany (GfK)	51
Netherlands (Single Top 100)	57
Switzerland (Schweizer Hitparade)	54

== Marcus Collins version ==
"Seven Nation Army"

Single by Marcus Collins

from the album Marcus Collins
- B-side: "Break These Chains"
- Released: March 4, 2012
- Genre: Soul-pop
- Length: 2:56
- Label: RCA
- Songwriter: Jack White
- Producers: Matt Furmidge; Alex Smith; Brian Rawling

Marcus Collins singles chronology
"Wishing on a Star" (2011)	"Seven Nation Army" (2012)	"Mercy" (2012)

Music video
- "Seven Nation Army" on YouTube

Professional ratings
Review scores
Source	Rating
Digital Spy	3/5 stars

British singer and The X Factor 2011 finalist Marcus Collins performed a cover of "Seven Nation Army" based on Ben l'Oncle Soul's cover. A music video for the cover was uploaded to YouTube on February 16, 2012. The song was released as his debut single on March 4, 2012, and appears on his self-titled debut album (2012).

Critically, Lewis Corner of Digital Spy noted the "distinctive soul-pop" vocals showcased by Collins and wrote that, "Truth be told, we wish he'd fought a little harder to get one of those eight original compositions he has on his forthcoming record out first." Priya Elan of NME concluded that although the cover may have seemed "disturbing in theory", it was ultimately "disposable and forgettable as a McChicken sandwich [...] but not bad". Collins said that he received "a lot of abuse" from White Stripes fans in response to his cover, and he asserted that people should "listen to the original if you don't like my singing".

=== Track listing ===
No.	Title	Length
1.	"Seven Nation Army"	2:56
2.	"Break These Chains"	2:27

=== Charts ===
Chart (2012)	Peak position
Hungary (Rádiós Top 40)	13
Ireland (IRMA)	49
Scottish Singles Sales (Official Charts)	9
UK Singles (Official Charts)	9

=== Release history ===
Region	Date	Format	Label
United Kingdom	March 4, 2012	Digital download, CD single	RCA

== Other versions ==
The song has been covered by blues musician C. W. Stoneking, the country group the Oak Ridge Boys (with bass singer Richard Sterban singing the original guitar riffs), rock supergroup Audioslave, alternative rock band the Flaming Lips, British soul singer Alice Russell, American singer and television personality Kelly Clarkson, hard rock band the Pretty Reckless, English indie rock band Hard-Fi and Argentine electrotango band Tanghetto. In 2015, it was covered by Haley Reinhart for Scott Bradlee's Postmodern Jukebox in a style reminiscent of a New Orleans funeral march. French neofolk group SKÁLD covered the song in 2019 for the Alfar Fagrahvél edition of their album Vikings Chant, with minor changes to the lyrics, with the city of "Wichita" changed to "Uppsala".

The song was covered during Maroon 5's Overexposed Tour in 2012, with lead guitarist James Valentine providing guitar and vocals and lead vocalist Adam Levine providing drums. The song was also covered by KT Tunstall (as a medley with her own "Black Horse and the Cherry Tree") on her 2013 Invisible Empire/Crescent Moon tour. Ramin Djawadi made a cover version of the song with sitar for Westworld season 2. The song is also included in the "Backstage Romance" number of Moulin Rouge!, where it is in a medley with "Bad Romance", "Tainted Love", "Toxic", and "Sweet Dreams (Are Made of This)". During Twenty One Pilots' The Bandito Tour, the musical duo would sometimes perform the song as a mashup with one of their own songs, "Morph". They also performed the song at the 2025 Rock and Roll Hall of Fame Ceremony in honor of The White Stripes' induction.
