= Elephant (album) =

2003 studio album by the White Stripes

Studio album by the White Stripes
- Released: April 1, 2003
- Recorded: November 5, 13, 2001; April 24–May 13, 2002
- Studios: Toe Rag; Maida Vale (London)
- Genres: Alternative rock; blues rock; garage rock; indie rock; punk blues
- Length: 49:56
- Labels: V2; XL; Third Man
- Producer: Jack White

The White Stripes chronology
White Blood Cells (2001)	Elephant (2003)	Get Behind Me Satan (2005)

Singles from Elephant
- 1. "Seven Nation Army" Released: February 17, 2003; 2. "The Hardest Button to Button" Released: August 11, 2003; 3. "I Just Don't Know What to Do with Myself" Released: September 1, 2003; 4. "There's No Home for You Here" Released: March 15, 2004

Elephant is the fourth studio album by American rock duo the White Stripes. It was released on April 1, 2003 in the United States by V2 Records and in the United Kingdom by XL Recordings. It was produced by vocalist and guitarist Jack White, and was mostly recorded across two weeks at Toe Rag Studios in April and May 2002. (Note: Although most of Elephant was recorded in April and May 2002, at least three of the album's tracks were recorded in November 2001.) Continuing the "back-to-basics" approach from the band's previous album, White Blood Cells (2001), it features lyrics about the "death of the sweetheart" in American popular culture.

Elephant reached the top ten of multiple territories, peaking at number six on the US Billboard 200 and topping the UK Albums Chart, and achieved multiple platinum status in several countries. It sold over four million units worldwide, making it the band's best-selling album. The album produced the hit singles "Seven Nation Army", "The Hardest Button to Button" and "I Just Don't Know What to Do with Myself", the first of which boosted its sales. The album received widespread critical acclaim and several accolades, including a nomination for Album of the Year and winning Best Alternative Music Album at the 2004 Grammy Awards.

Elephant is widely recognized as a key work of the 2000s indie and garage rock revivals, solidifying Jack and Meg White's leading positions in the movements. It has been named by several publications as the White Stripes's magnum opus and features on several publications' listings of the best albums of all time.

== Recording and production ==
The White Stripes originally visited Toe Rag Studios late July 2001, at the behest of British drummer Bruce Brand, the day after a performance at the 100 Club in London, England. Brand and Toe Rag proprietor, Liam Watson, who served as the album's engineer, were in a band called the Masonics. The Masonics' U.S. agent arranged for them to open for the White Stripes during that performance and asked Brand to assist The White Stripes while they were in the United Kingdom. The White Stripes returned to the studio in November 2001 to record several songs: "It's True That We Love One Another", "You've Got Her in Your Pocket" and "Hypnotize", (Note: In addition to "It's True That We Love One Another", "You've Got Her in Your Pocket" and "Hypnotize", a couple of unspecified songs were recorded that night in November 2001, however they were discarded. 20 songs in total were written and recorded for the album, but only 15 were expected to make it onto the album. "Who's To Say", a cover of Detroit alternative country band Blanche, was recorded at Toe Rag yet it was crossed out as "not used" on the multi-track masters and became a B-side to the UK single of "I Just Don't Know What to Do with Myself". "Good to Me", a cover of Brendan Benson, and the traditional folk song "Black Jack Davey" became B-sides to UK 7" vinyl and CD singles of "Seven Nation Army" respectively. That leaves three unknown recorded tracks from the album.) whereas "I Just Don't Know What to Do with Myself" was recorded at BBC's Maida Vale Studios. They returned to Toe Rag again in April 2002 to record the rest of the album. On certain releases, "Hypnotize" was mistakenly marked as recorded in April, which was corrected on the 20th anniversary release. The White Stripes had planned to release the album in fall 2002, but the unexpected popularity of White Blood Cells pushed the release to spring 2003. Jack and Meg explain that the title of Elephant reflects their contrasting personalities and how they often switch roles when performing onstage, much like the nature of its mammalian namesake who is both "innocent" and "thunderous."

Toe Rag had a reputation within the garage rock world as the kind of studio artists "dreamed of recording at." The studio was chosen to escape the distractions of home by working in another country, as well as the fact that the Holly Golightly song "Indeed You Do" (from her 1997 album Painted On) had been recorded there. In contrast to supposedly hedonistic Los Angeles recording studios with "a cappuccino machine and video games between takes," according to guitarist and vocalist Jack White, Toe Rag was "claustrophobically cramped" and "freezing" with a virtually inoperable heat radiator, which forced them to concentrate on the work. In early 2000s, Toe Rag's location in Hackney was a notoriously violent area of London and a "harsh environment," regardless of which Jack considers it the "best studio experience [they've] ever had," and they found the studio "mind-blowing." All songs, including B-sides, were mixed in one day at the studio; Jack suggested the idea of mixing it at Abbey Road Studios, though Watson ultimately chose to do it at Toe Rag. Watson engineered the album in shifts of 6 hours at a time across approximately 10 days, although there were some days off during the two weeks booked at the studio in order to accommodate other work on the schedule such as concerts. The album would likely have been recorded in less time, but Watson had a policy of not working past dinner hours. The recording dates reportedly took place between April 24, and May 13, 2002. The album was recorded for a budget of a reported £4,000 (or £6,000 if accounting for the cost of the hotel stay and other extraneous expenses) (Note: Jack said the album was made for $8,000, which would have been about £5,000 by contemporary exchange rates.) and Jack returned in late September 2002 to re-record and remix certain vocals.

Jack produced the album with antiquated equipment, including an 8-track and tape machine, not in an attempt to sound "retro" but rather in the belief that it was "the pinnacle of recording technology". Watson was unfamiliar with their other albums but held the same belief, using the Beatles and the Rolling Stones as reference. Watson taught Meg how tape edit, as she was intrigued by the process, and she edited an unspecified song. Computers were not used during Elephant's writing, recording, or production. A rumor spread that no equipment created after 1963 was used in production, though Jack says it was promoted by "lazy" journalists and never fact-checked. In fact, most of the equipment including the main mixing desk was from the 1980s according to Liam Watson; he also called the rumor "a load of crap." A REDD .17 mixing desk originally from Abbey Road Studios was indeed present at Toe Rag, however it was not the one used on this album as Watson used a Calrec M Series model originally from the BBC. The White Stripes and Watson "hid the CD burner" so as to mentally transport them to another time period.

The White Stripes often exhausted the limits of the 8-track recorder. Watson felt a 24-track recorder would have taken longer and they both believed 8-track was suitable considering that, in the past, the Beatles had famously done more with less. Watson used "Seven Nation Army" as a demonstration: the song was played live with a guide vocal on one track and Jack's guitar going through two amplifiers on their own tracks using Shure and AKG dynamic microphones. The drums were mixed to one track except for the bass drum which had its own track. After repeating the process with a second guitar on spare tracks, the main vocal, which used a Neumann condenser microphone going to the Calrec console and a Shure dynamic microphone going to an amplifier (which itself used an AKG dynamic microphone), both microphones were combined with tape delay and spring reverb through a compressor, replacing the live guide vocal. A second vocal passage, recorded exactly the same way as the main vocal, took the last unused track of the one-inch. The lead guitar and second vocal took the 8th track, for which Watson mixed the microphones to mono to resolve the issue of running out of tracks. Multiple songs, such as "Ball and Biscuit", "Little Acorns", and "The Hardest Button to Button" did not use all 8 tracks.

Watson extensively used 4 Shure S4SD Unidyne III microphones, from the top of the snare drum to Jack's live guide vocals and amplifiers. A Neumann U 67 condenser microphone was primarily used for the main vocals. Jack's Fender Twin Reverb and Watson's Selmer Truvoice Zodiac Twin 30 amplifier respectively were used on the album (as Jack did not want to ship his tried-and-true Silvertone amplifier to the United Kingdom) with Shure 545 and AKG D25 microphones. AKG dynamic and condenser microphones were used on the drums. A UREI 1176 compressor was used for one vocal track and that was the only outboard gear used on the album. Mix down occurred on a BASF 900. "You've Got Her In Your Pocket" was recorded in stereo using a Coles 4038 microphone, an Altec M11 condenser microphone, and a borrowed Martin guitar; Watson had to consult the BBC manual during the recording process as he did not generally record acoustic guitars in stereo and used its omnidirectional "figure 8" method. "I Want to Be the Boy to Warm Your Mother's Heart", "Little Acorns", "The Air Near My Fingers", "It's True That We Love One Another", and "Good to Me" were performed on the studio's dilapidated Herrberger Brooks upright piano, which in 2014, Jack and its Polish owner coordinated in Sopot to auction it for charity.

== Music and lyrics ==
=== Composition and sound ===
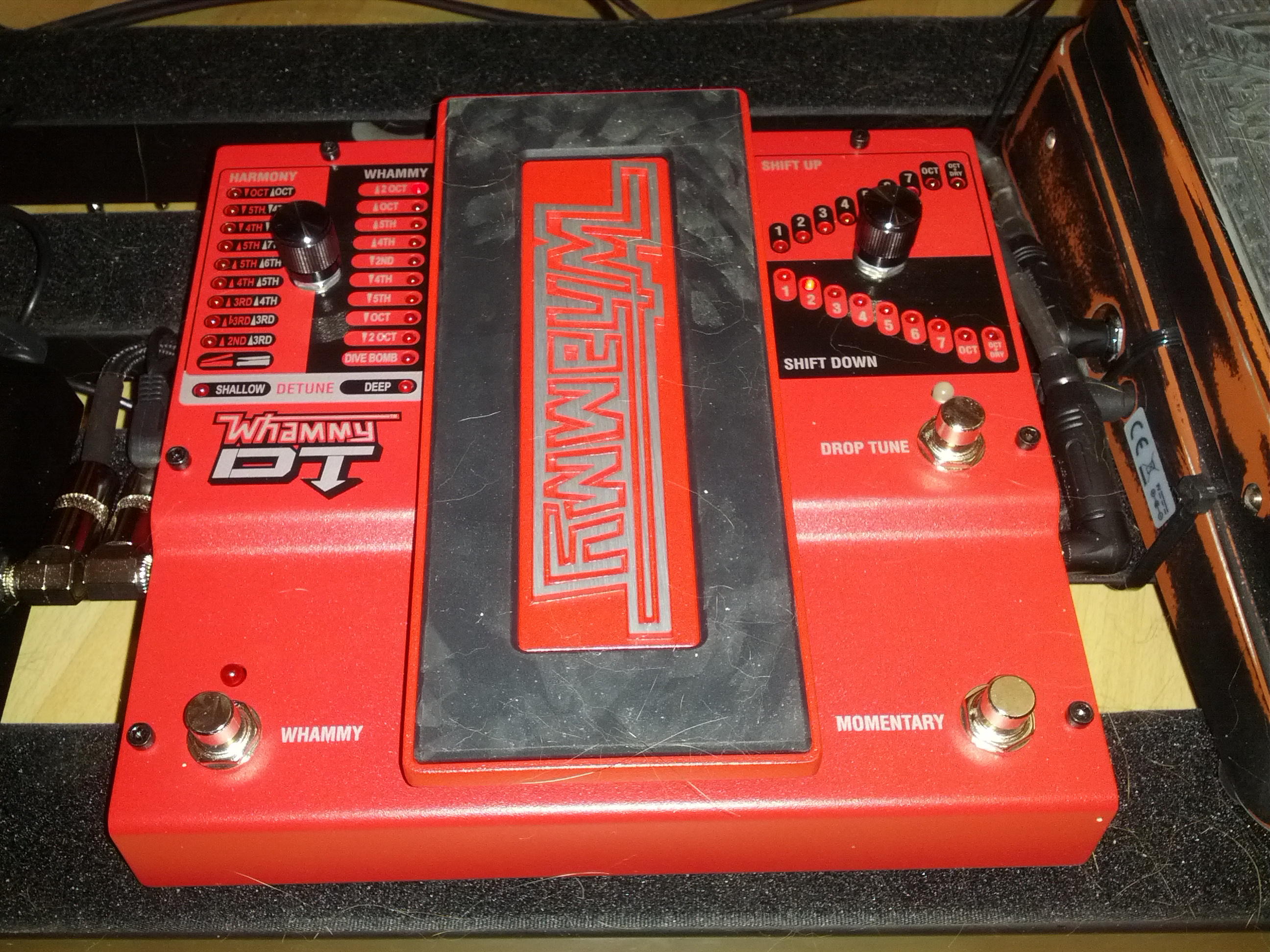
Elephant uses a DigiTech Whammy to create a bass-like sound.

Elephant is a garage rock, blues rock, and punk blues record that advances the "back to basics" approach from the White Stripes's previous album, White Blood Cells (2001). The album was originally envisioned as a melancholic project, though Jack clarified that they did not go into the album with an intended sound or genre, and his comments were so that fans would not expect more of "Fell in Love with a Girl" and White Blood Cells. At the time, Jack thought the album sounded "depressing" and initially believed it would be a "pretty quiet" album. "There was no real conscious thought involved in the different styles," Jack said. The album would have been made regardless of whether the band achieved popularity. Meg was "not really concerned about what the media thinks," as they were "really happy with it." The "power" of Toe Rag and the fervor of British fans changed its trajectory. Meg deemed Elephant "a tribute to England," and Jack called it a "total English product." It was a "guitar album" in that Jack incorporated guitar solos as "a present to himself" by tapping into the energy of his previous work with the Go.

The lyrics on Elephant, written almost entirely by Jack, revolve around the idea of the "death of the sweetheart" in both American culture and popular culture. "It seemed to keep coming up lyrically when I was writing the songs for this record. They revolve around this sweetheart or gentleman notion. I was coming to terms with a lot of it being very uncool nowadays, or very dead," Jack expounded. He observed that "You look at your average teenager with the body piercings and the tattoos. You have white kids going around talking in ghetto accents because they think that makes them hard. It's so cool to be hard. We're against that." Other themes on the record include love, demonstrated by tracks such as "I Just Don't Know What to Do with Myself" and "In the Cold, Cold Night", and perseverance, demonstrated by "Little Acorns".

Elephant's music was composed by the band. About one-third of the album was written in the studio, while the rest was written in the hotel room. With the exception of "It's True That We Love One Another", acoustic songs were performed on a borrowed Martin guitar. The band expanded their style with a bass line alongside lead and rhythm guitar, in addition to greater use of keyboards and pianos. Jack infamously used a DigiTech Whammy pedal to mimic the sound of a bass guitar for several of Elephant's tracks. He did so in "Seven Nation Army" and "The Hardest Button to Button" by connecting a semi-acoustic guitar to the pedal and lowering the pitch by an octave. "Seven Nation Army", "The Hardest Button to Button", and "Ball and Biscuit" are what Jack wrote to be "21st century blues" songs.

=== Songs 1–7 ===
Originally conceived as an idea for a potential James Bond theme, "Seven Nation Army" was conceived in 2002 during a sound check while the band toured in Australia. Jack downtuned his guitar by an octave rather than using a bass guitar to create the famous riff. The theme of the song surrounds their observations of industry gossip, the intrusive nature of the press, and the commercial aspects of the music industry. The song, which lacks a chorus, would ultimately take on a life of its own as a de facto sports anthem in stadiums around the world. It was typically the final song or encore in a White Stripes show, and Jack continues to perform it in his solo concerts.

"It's not a huge progression from the other albums. There are a lot of heavy songs in there and there are quiet songs as well. It's like you took all of our albums and sort of mixed them up. If you had to have one album that was a good example of everything that we do and sound like, this would be it."

— Meg on Elephant'

"Black Math" was inspired by an issue Jack had with his high school math teacher, basing the premise around the idea that students are taught what to think rather than how to think. It was frequently used as a concert opener as Jack felt it was "hard to whip out in the middle of a set." It was originally written when Jack was a member of The Go. Jack used his Japanese Crestwood Astral II guitar with an installed cut-off switch for the song. "There's No Home for You Here" was created by Jack layering between 12 and 15 vocal tracks on the 8-track recorder, however he later came to admit they went "too far" as well as "broke [their] rules." The song is one of two tracks on the album that were "not [Jack's] favorites" (the other being "The Air Near My Fingers"), though it was one of Watson's favorites. Jack said the song was about a boy he knew in the Detroit rock scene, but he changed the character description to be feminine.

"I Just Don't Know What to Do with Myself", originally a Dusty Springfield song written by Burt Bacharach and Hal David, was a staple of the live band's repertoire. It was officially recorded as a single as the original was a favorite of Meg's, described as her "baby." Jack considered the original Bacharach version a "blues song in its purest form" in its essence outside of its pop production. He considers it one of the band's best songs and one of his best vocal performances. The music video was directed by Sofia Coppola, whose idea it was for British supermodel Kate Moss to pole dance erotically. The White Stripes themselves are not featured in the video at all, although they were present for filming at a sound stage in New York City's Greenwich Village.

"In the Cold, Cold Night" was written by Jack for Meg to perform, featuring her performing leading vocals for the first time after only previously performing background vocals for De Stijl and White Blood Cells. Although she wanted Jack to write her a country song, "In the Cold Cold, Night" was inspired by musicians Mazzy Star and Peggy Lee (in her rendition of R&B standard "Fever"). Prior to its recording, she built her confidence by singing solo live. "I Want to Be the Boy to Warm Your Mother's Heart" represents the "sweetheart" ethos of the record, and was compared to the work of musicians Big Star and Paul McCartney. The song started with the title and the story was "self-explanatory" because of it. The lyrics were based on "questions or ideas" Jack had about the story and appear largely in their original form. Its demo was created at the same time, on the same reel, as "Little Acorns".

First performed live in 1999 after the release of their debut album, "You've Got Her in Your Pocket" is considered to be about an obsessive lover. By Jack's account, it soured the mood at Toe Rag during the recording process (having been recorded after the jovial "It's True We Love One Another"), though it became Meg's favorite White Stripes song. The song was first recorded as a demo in 1998, and one of many songs developed with his former band Two-Star Tabernacle that became a White Stripes song. It is the only song on their albums that features Jack completely solo, a song he considers "very, very me—100% me."

=== Songs 8–14 ===
"I don’t really know what happened. We were about to record 'Ball And Biscuit', which was written in the studio. All was peaceful and calm when, suddenly, it was as if the devil got into me and I could not hear anything except guitars. Fat, dirty, ear-destroying guitar sounds. It was as if some higher power said to me that now, Jack White, is the time to start playing guitar solos."

— Jack on "Ball and Biscuit"

"Ball and Biscuit", named after a STC 4021 microphone used in the studio, is the longest song in their discography at over 7 minutes. It is built around the folkloric theme of the seventh son, corresponding to Jack's actual birth order among his brothers, and being the "third man" of a woman's sexual partners. He "wanted it to be making fun of cockiness. It kind of disgusts me when you see that in our environment, that it's so attractive to women—that cockiness." The mumbling at the end of the song represents the "beautiful woman" continuing to walk away as he failed to seduce her. The song has been used in media such as the intro of the 2010 film The Social Network.

"The Hardest Button to Button", a phrase inspired by Jack's father, is a metaphor for the "odd man out" of a family. It was the album's second single and spawned a music video directed by Michel Gondry, a frequent collaborator of the band. It was filmed around Manhattan across 2 days, featuring Jack and Meg playing their instruments which multiply with every beat using a form of stop-motion called pixilation. The video was parodied in The Simpsons episode "Jazzy and the Pussycats", with the band making a cameo. Jack considers it their greatest video and among the greatest ever made. Its cover artwork was an illusion to the film poster of The Man with the Golden Arm (1955).

"Little Acorns" was a spoken word monologue by broadcast journalist Mort Crim, whose speech was already on a tape given to Jack by one of his brothers. He began recording piano and was unaware that Crim's vocals had been there until he played the tape, writing the song around the story. "Hypnotize" was an unused song written by Jack for the Detroit rock band the Henchmen, and is one of shortest songs in the White Stripes' discography, self-described as "rock n' roll length." The song had existed by at least June 2001, and was performed in January 2002, but was not performed again until Jack included it in his solo concerts beginning in 2023.

Essentially a filler track, Jack almost took "The Air Near My Fingers" off the album but decided not to retroactively make any changes after recording, keeping it due to its motif of mothers and its bridge despite hating everything else about the song. Although the title is not mentioned in the song, it came from the storyline of the character. Critics perceived the song "Girl, You Have No Faith in Medicine" as misogynistic or sexist, and Meg herself took issue with the lyrics. (The song was not directly inspired by her.) However, Jack asserted that it was merely about the differences between male and female psychology and that one side was not superior. The song was originally meant for White Blood Cells.

"It's True That We Love One Another" was the first song recorded for the album, and features Holly Golightly as a guest vocalist; it is their only song to feature singers other than Jack and Meg. Inspired by "Creeque Alley" by the Mamas & the Papas, the premise is that Jack and Holly are having a lovers' spat and Meg is trying to get them to reconcile. The "Bruce" beckoned to by Golightly for tea at the end of the song was British drummer Bruce Brand, whose Burns London guitar was used by Jack. Both Jack and Meg said that having a cup of tea was the only comfort in the studio. The song was written at what was then a Holiday Inn hotel room in London, near Brand's home. Recollections differ on the origin of the song: Jack and Watson recalled it being written, recorded, and mixed the same day, which would have been November 5, 2001; however Brand wrote in a journal entry documenting the preceding tour and recording of Elephant that the song was possibly written around the night of November 2, 2001, because Jack came over that night to play the song for him, though Brand did not seem to be fond of it at first. Golightly recalled the song as having been written on a napkin at a restaurant the night before and recorded the next day.

== Artwork and packaging ==
Reissues of Elephant often change the color of Meg's dress or Jack's outfit.

Similar to the band's other albums, Elephant's cover art and liner notes are exclusively in red, white, and black. They were photographed by The Dirtbombs member Patrick Pantano in a Detroit photo studio in late 2002. On the reverse side of the US edition, all of the number "3"s are in red (disregarding the authorization notes at the bottom). The cryptic symbolism of the album art includes a skull sitting on the floor in the background, as well as peanuts and peanut shells in the foreground, and on the circus travel trunk appears the mark "III", Jack's signature Jack is displaying a mano cornuta and looking at a light bulb intensely, while Meg is barefoot and appears to be crying, with a rope tied around her ankle and leading out of frame. Meg said the rope is an elephant reference but decided not to further explain the easter eggs of the album artwork for the audience's sake. Both have small white ribbons tied to their fingers. In an interview with Q in 2007, Jack said, "If you study the picture carefully, Meg and I are elephant ears in a head-on elephant. But it's a side view of an elephant, too, with the tusks leading off either side." He went on to say, "I wanted people to be staring at this album cover and then maybe two years later, having stared at it for the 500th time, to say, 'Hey, it's an elephant!'" The White Stripes are dressed as what Jack called "dying country stars" as a commentary on modern country music and the leitmotif of the "death of the sweetheart." The skull behind Meg was an allusion to the "Meg is dead and replaced by a robot" conspiracy theory that circulated in 2002. Meg's dress was bought by Olivia Rodrigo at auction in 2026.

The album has been released with at least six different versions of the front cover—different covers for the CD and LP editions in the US, the UK and elsewhere. On the US CD edition, Meg is sitting on the left of a circus travel trunk and Jack is sitting on the right holding a cricket bat over the ground, while on the UK CD edition, the cricket bat touches the ground and the image is mirrored so that their positions on the trunk are reversed. The bat belonged to New Zealand cricketer Kane Williamson, who happens to be the cousin of their tour manager, John Baker. (Note: Baker brought the bat to the United States during a tour and left it in Detroit. Jack had learned about cricket from John Peel, and supposedly made cricket references throughout the album.) The UK vinyl album cover is the same as the US CD, but differs in that the color hues are much darker. The Record Store Day 2013 vinyl and August 2013 180-gram black vinyl reissues have Meg wearing a black dress instead of the usual white dress; the only other release with Meg wearing the black dress was on the V2 advanced copy back in 2003. The advanced copy was on red and white vinyl, while the RSD copy has red, black and white colored vinyl in 2013. A 20th anniversary limited edition has Jack wearing all white similar to the limited 2003 Australian pressing.

The artwork of Elephant has become iconic. It appeared on Billboard's list of "The 100 Best Album Covers of All Time".

== Promotion and release ==
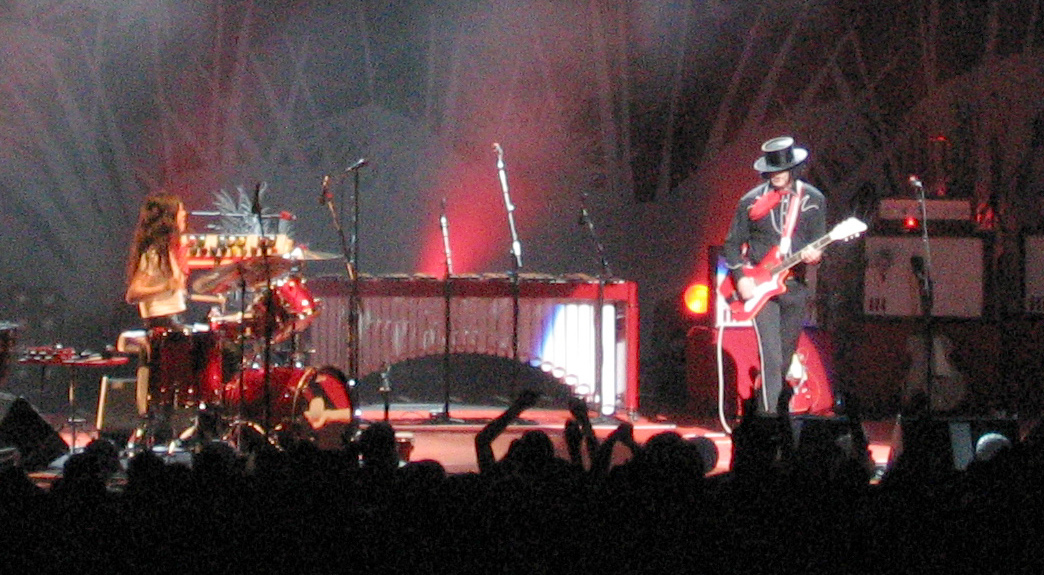
The White Stripes performing in 2005

The track list for Elephant was announced in January 2003 to NME, and four singles were announced to promote the album. After a debate with XL Recordings, "Seven Nation Army" was released as the lead single on February 17. The song peaked at number 76 on the Billboard Hot 100, the band's first entry on the chart, while reaching the top 10 in the United Kingdom and entering multiple international territories; it also became the first garage rock song to top Billboard's Modern Rock Songs chart. In March, Elephant was given to NME for an early review. The White Stripes were set to tour that same month, but postponed after Meg broke her wrist. Although shows were postponed when Meg broke her wrist and months later Jack severely broke his fingers in a car accident on his 28th birthday, the music videos for "Seven Nation Army" and "The Hardest Button to Button" were still filmed during their respective injuries, and their casts are visible in the videos.

Elephant was officially released on April 1 by V2 Records in the United States and XL in the United Kingdom. The band began their promotional tour on June 13, and performed for six weeks across North America until July 23. "The Hardest Button to Button" was released as the second single on August 11, (Note: First released to US alternative radio on August 11, 2003.) which peaked in the top 10 of the US Alternative Songs chart and drew attention for its music video. "I Just Don't Know What To Do With Myself" was released as the third single on September 1, which became their first work to chart in the Netherlands and New Zealand. The fourth and final single, "There's No Home for You Here", was released on March 15, 2004 and failed to replicate the success of its predecessors. That same year, the band released their first concert film, Under Blackpool Lights, which entered multiple charts.

Elephant has continued to be reissued by Jack's Third Man Records, notably on anniversary dates. In 2013, Third Man Records released a limited edition vinyl reissue of Elephant, in celebration of the album's 10-year anniversary, which were pressed at United Record Pressing in Nashville, TN. In January 2023, a mono remix of the album, titled Elephant XX, was announced and later released exclusively through Third Man Records. That same year, a deluxe edition for the anniversary was released with live recordings from a performance in Chicago's Aragon Ballroom.

In late October 2004, over a year after the album's release, John Peel, the band's early champion who heavily promoted Elephant on his radio show, died suddenly while in Cusco, Peru. Jack and Meg had been in England the prior week before going home but returned immediately to England for his funeral, costing them a significant amount of money. During Peel's funeral, the White Stripes briefly jammed with Robert Plant and a priest. At the time of his death, Peel had more White Stripes records in his collection than any other artist.

== Elephant tour ==
Although the band premiered two Elephant songs live at a brief London concert in February 2003, not long afterward, Meg slipped on ice in New York City and broke her left wrist in two places, which affected any other promotional dates. The music video for "Seven Nation Army" was still filmed and her cast was mostly hidden from view. It healed in time for the tour to officially commence in Wolverhampton, England on April 7, 2003. They continued to Manchester, England; Glasgow, Scotland; and London's Brixton Academy for two dates. Three days later, they came home to Detroit to perform at the Scottish Rite Cathedral of the Detroit Masonic Temple. The tour then went to New York City's Hammerstein Ballroom before heading east to Boston, Massachusetts. They returned to New York City to perform for four nights on Late Night with Conan O'Brien. They then went across the country to Indio, California to perform at the Coachella festival. Sharing the bill with the Stooges, who had reunited, Jack interviewed Iggy Pop at the festival and this interview appeared as a cover feature for Mojo later that year. After Coachella, they headed north to San Francisco and San Diego, California. After the California dates, they returned to Manchester, England in early May to perform at BBC Radio 1's Big Weekend festival before going to Scandinavia's Stockholm, Sweden; Oslo, Norway; and Copenhagen, Denmark. They then headed south to Germany to perform in Berlin on Die Harald Schmidt Show, then went to Cologne before returning to Berlin to do an official concert, and ended the week in Hamburg at the Große Freiheit 36 venue. Continuing through Europe, they went to Amsterdam, The Netherlands before heading south to perform in Paris, France; the Primavera Sound festival in Barcelona, Spain; and in Madrid, Spain. They returned to France to perform in Villeurbanne. The European segment of the tour ended in Zurich, Switzerland; Vienna, Austria; Rome, Italy, and a festival in Bologna, Italy in early June.

After returning to the United States, the band performed in Mountain View, California for San Francisco radio station KITS's festival and for the Los Angeles radio station KROQ's Weenie Roast festival. They returned to the East Coast to perform in Raleigh, North Carolina and Charlotte, North Carolina; heading south to Tampa, Florida and Boca Raton, Florida; then back north to perform in Stone Mountain, Georgia. They returned to Florida to perform in Orlando, before heading west to New Orleans, Louisiana. In Texas, they performed in Houston, Austin, and Grand Prairie. They headed north to Oklahoma City, Oklahoma before going to the Midwest to perform in Kansas City, Missouri and St. Louis. They continued to Chicago to perform at the Aragon Ballroom in early July. An early version of what became "Little Cream Soda", which appears on Icky Thump (2007), was performed during the set. After the concerts in Saint Paul, Minnesota and Milwaukee, Wisconsin, Jack broke his finger in a car accident that occurred in his neighborhood on his 28th birthday, postponing many shows including British festivals. The Nashville, Tennessee and Norfolk, Virginia dates were cancelled entirely. Three screws were surgically inserted and his finger was permanently damaged. He considered this as escaping the 27 Club–"with a warning."

The tour continued on September 13, 2003, in Berkeley, California. They went north to Vancouver, Canada and returned to the United States to perform in Seattle, Washington; Portland, Oregon; Denver, Colorado; Las Vegas, Nevada; and returned to Los Angeles, California to perform multiple nights at the Greek Theatre before heading south to La Jolla, California. After performing in Mesa, Arizona, the band went across the world to tour New Zealand and Australia, playing in Auckland, Wellington, Sydney, Melbourne, Adelaide, Perth, and Brisbane. The Sydney, Melbourne, and Brisbane dates included the final Livid festival. By the Oceanic and Japanese segment of the tour, the band had become severely jet lagged, time blind, and sleep deprived yet still expected to perform full concerts. After Oceania, the White Stripes went to Japan to perform in Tokyo at the Shibuya-AX. This concert appears on the album's 20th anniversary DVD. After stops in Nagoya, Fukuoka, Hiroshima, Osaka, and returning to Tokyo, the band traversed the world to perform on Halloween in Rio de Janeiro, Brazil before returning to the United States to play in New Orleans once again, two days later. The next week, they returned to Milwaukee, Wisconsin, and continued in the Midwest to Indianapolis, Indiana and Columbus, Ohio. They returned to Canada to perform in Mississauga, and Toronto, Ontario (in a televised performance for the latter), as well as Montreal, Quebec. The postponed Providence, Rhode Island date continued the tour in the United States before multiple shows in New York City. They then went east to Lowell, Massachusetts; south to Washington, D.C., north to Camden, New Jersey (which replaced a date in Philadelphia, Pennsylvania); then west to Cincinnati, Ohio; east to Pittsburgh, Pennsylvania; returned home to perform in Detroit, Michigan; east to Cleveland, Ohio; and finally to Chicago, Illinois on New Years' Eve to perform again at the Aragon Ballroom.

In January 2004, they returned to the United Kingdom to play in Liverpool, England; Nottingham, England; and London's Alexandra Palace for two nights. Glasgow, Scotland followed, after which Jack said Scotland had the best audience in the world. They then went to Blackpool, England where they filmed Under Blackpool Lights. Jack was extremely disastisfied with their performance in it, however their rendition of "Jolene" reached number one on the UK Indie chart. A few days afterward, Jack appeared solo on John Peel's radio show to perform some acoustic songs chosen on a whim. Concerts in Bridlington, and London, England, then finally Paris, France concluded the tour.

The next week, the White Stripes performed "Seven Nation Army" and "Death Letter" at the Grammy Awards, where they won two trophies out of three nominations. After several months off, in summer 2004, the White Stripes performed at festivals in Japan, Belgium, and the Netherlands. They performed a concert in Belfast, Northern Ireland before headlining the Reading and Leeds Festivals with France's Rock en Seine between them.

The tour was so successful that the band was getting offers to continue around the world for years, but they were not able to tour Canada beyond a smattering of dates despite the album's success in the country. After the tour ended at the beginning of 2004, Jack had become too exhausted to play or write songs. The band used to want to make one album per year, as the Beatles had often released multiple albums per year, but with the success the band had earned Meg opined that more went into the music business than just releasing the album. In mid-2003, unmaterialized plans to record the next album with Watson were discussed and reports circulated that the album could have been recorded by the end of 2003. Jack did not write any songs until late 2004, for would become Get Behind Me Satan (2005).

== Critical reception ==
Professional ratings
Aggregate scores
Source	Rating
Metacritic	92/100
Review scores
Source	Rating
AllMusic	5/5 stars
Entertainment Weekly	B
The Guardian	4/5 stars
Los Angeles Times	4/4 stars
NME	9/10
Pitchfork	6.9/10
Q	4/5 stars
Rolling Stone	5/5 stars
Spin	A
Uncut	5/5 stars

Elephant received widespread acclaim from music critics; review aggregating website Metacritic reports a normalized score of 92 out of 100 based on 28 reviews, indicating "universal acclaim". According to Times & Transcript journalist Jason Murray, Elephant "was accepted widely for its mix of hard rocking, garage sounding, disco metal mix that made even the biggest critics think again." In a perfect five-star review, AllMusic critic Heather Phares said Elephant "overflows with quality". David Fricke of Rolling Stone called Elephant "a work of pulverizing perfection," and believed it exceeded "the plantation holler of 2000's De Stijl and 2001's White Blood Cells with blues that both pop and bleed."

John Mulvey of NME rated Elephant 9/10 and stated that "The eloquence, barbarism, tenderness and sweat-drenched vitality of Elephant make it the most fully-realised White Stripes album yet." The Los Angeles Times's Robert Hilburn claimed that the band earned more respect "than any other U.S. band since Nirvana and Nine Inch Nails" and compared the listening experience to "playing chess with a tournament pro -- an experience so full of unexpected twists and turns that you find yourself trying to guess where he's [Jack] going, only to marvel at his choices." Alexis Petridis of The Guardian called it their "apotheosis" and wrote that "the White Stripes' music seems almost elemental, their power undeniable: it is clear why they are the only band to have transcended the indie ghetto." Uncut magazine remarked that "Elephant is where the tabloid phenomenon of summer 2001 prove they are no flash in the pan by making a truly phenomenal record."

In contrast, Jon Pareles of The New York Times, while praising the continuation of their "back to basics" template, felt that "the quest—for something that might as well be called heart—is still ahead of them." Rob Brunner of Entertainment Weekly deemed Elephant a "front-loaded Jack White powerhouse" and called the band half-talented, criticizing Meg's drumming. Brent DiCrescenzo of Pitchfork was similarly negative in his review, believing Jack's blending of elements seemed superficial and Meg's drumming was "pancake-handed". Lorraine Ali of Newsweek criticized the band's gimmicks but concluded that the album "still sounds great."

Elephant was named the best album of 2003 by Loudwire, NME, and Spin. It also placed highly in other end-of-year lists, including The Village Voice's Pazz & Jop poll and The Guardian's roundup. The record netted the band their first Grammy Awards at the 2004 ceremony, winning the Best Alternative Music Album and Best Rock Song ("Seven Nation Army") awards, in addition to the band's only nomination for the Album of the Year award. It also won Best International Album at the 2004 Meteor Music Awards, and was nominated for Best Album at the 2003 MTV Europe Music Awards, International Album at the 2004 Brit Awards, and Best Album at the 2004 Shockwaves NME Awards.

== Commercial performance ==
Elephant entered the Billboard 200 at number six after first week sales of 126,000 units and spent 58 weeks on the chart, the longest of any White Stripes album. It was certified platinum in the United States in September 2003, and ended the year at number 57 on the Billboard 200. That same month, it received a platinum certification in Canada. In the UK, the album topped the UK Albums Chart and spent 55 weeks on the chart. It was certified double platinum in October 2003 and finished the year at number 22 on the UK Albums Chart.

In October 2009, Elephant was certified double platinum in Australia. In March 2023, ahead of the album's 20th anniversary, it received a double platinum certification in the United States. By December 2003, the album was certified triple platinum in Canada and the United Kingdom. As of 2025, Elephant has earned the most certifications of any White Stripes album.

== Legacy ==
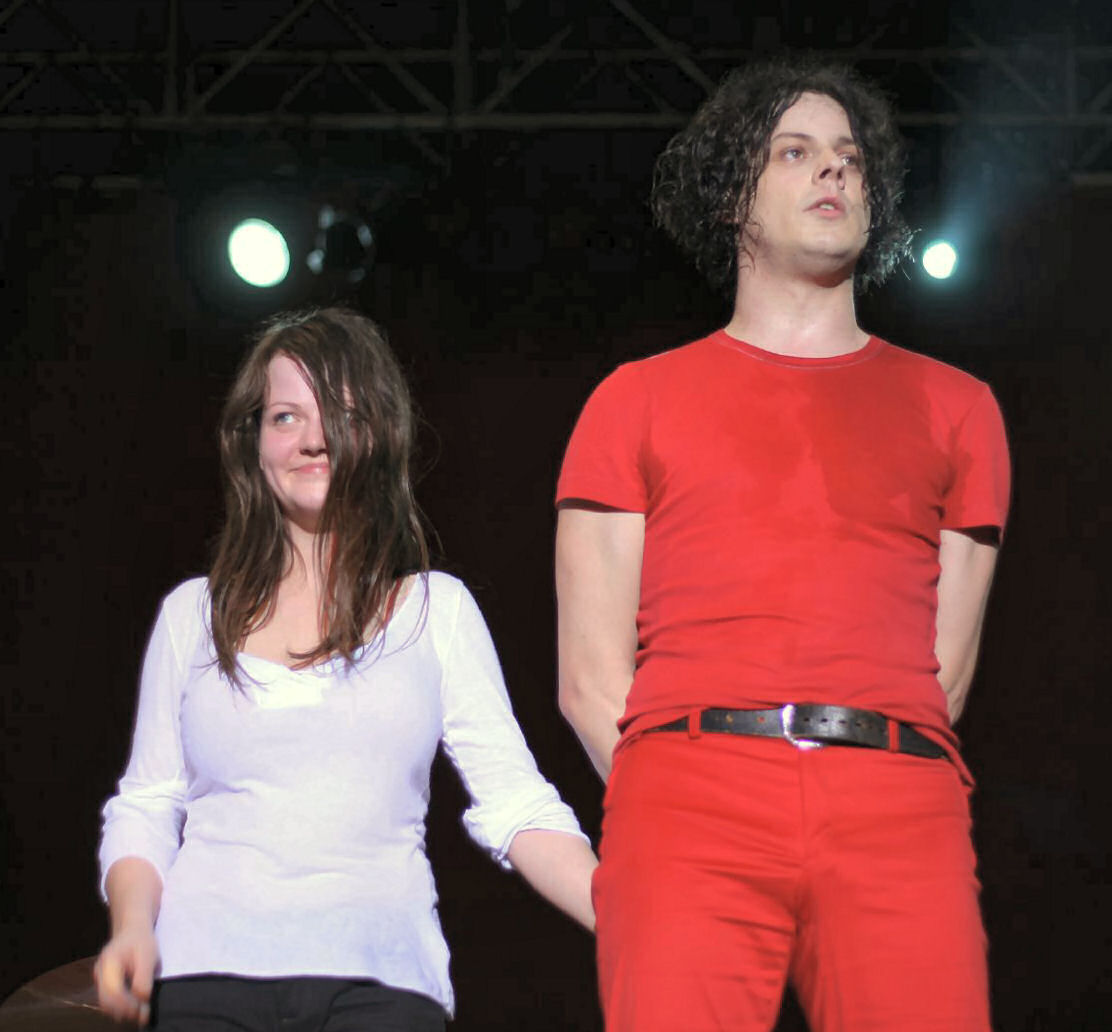
Elephant and its singles played a significant role in the popularity of the White Stripes. Pictured are band members Meg (left) and Jack White (right) in 2007.

Since its release, Elephant has been cited by critics as a landmark album of the 2000s rock movements and the White Stripes's best work. Sarah Boden of The Guardian observed that, by the end of the 2000s, "nobody matched Jack and Meg when it came to creating a colossal sound out of such basic ingredients. Elephant, after all, was the release that banished preconceptions about the White Stripes' self-consciously limiting format and affirmed that they were consistently and swaggeringly magnificent." Tom Breihan of Stereogum deemed the album as the band's "show-and-prove moment. They showed, and they proved." Breihan further wrote that "the vast majority of Elephant holds together as a mean, surly, pretty statement of rock dominance. The pressure was on, but they weren't gonna crack." Ultimate Classic Rock's Michael Gallucci declared that Elephant sparked a "rock revolution" and made guitar-based music prominent again, calling it a "masterpiece".

The success of "Seven Nation Army" boosted the album's reach and sales, becoming the White Stripes's signature song and most enduring work. Writers at Rolling Stone and NME deemed it a career-changing hit, while the latter publication said the song propelled the band "from their garage rock beginnings to an entirely new level of acclaim". After its initial run on music charts, the song—especially its riff—grew in popularity as a result of its usage in sports. Erik Adams of The A.V. Club attributed the song's popularity to its simplicity, a characteristic that he remarked makes the song "instantly familiar" and "instantly memorized". "Seven Nation Army" and other tracks from Elephant are among the band's most recognizable songs.

Olivia Rodrigo said Elephant is the album she listens to most. In a Spin article, artists who cited the album as an inspiration include Ron Gallo, Rob Miller, Brett Newski, Mike Peters, Slug, Bela Salazar, Gina Schock, Imaad Wasif, Charlie Wayne, and Nancy Wilson.

=== Rankings ===
In March 2003, a month before its release, NME ranked Elephant at 74 on their list of the "100 Best Albums of All Time" list. Halfway through the 2000s, it appeared in the book 1001 Albums You Must Hear Before You Die. In 2009, Billboard ranked it at number nine in its list of the Top 20 Albums of the Decade. That same year, Rolling Stone ranked it number five on their list of the 100 Best Albums of the 2000s. Other publications that included Elephant on their decade-best albums lists include Complex, Consequence, NME, Paste, Pitchfork, Spin, Slant, and Uncut

In 2012, Rolling Stone ranked Elephant at 390 on their list of the 500 Greatest Albums of All Time, dropping it to 449 in the 2020 revision. In 2013, NME ranked the album 114 on their list of The 500 Greatest Albums of All Time. Also in 2013, readers at Mojo voted Elephant as the most influential album of the last 20 years. In 2019, The Guardian ranked it 48 on their The 100 Best Albums of the 21st Century list. In 2020, Newsweek ranked it 81 on their 100 Best Rock Albums of All Time; the same publication ranked it 13 on their 50 Best Rock Albums from the 21st Century in 2021.

== Track listing ==
All lyrics are written by Jack White, except where noted; all music is composed by Jack White and Meg White, except where noted.

Elephant track listing
No.	Title	Lyrics	Music	Length
1.	"Seven Nation Army"			3:52
2.	"Black Math"			3:04
3.	"There's No Home for You Here"			3:44
4.	"I Just Don't Know What to Do with Myself"	Hal David	Burt Bacharach	2:46
5.	"In the Cold, Cold Night"			2:58
6.	"I Want to Be the Boy to Warm Your Mother's Heart"			3:21
7.	"You've Got Her in Your Pocket"			3:40
8.	"Ball and Biscuit"			7:19
9.	"The Hardest Button to Button"			3:32
10.	"Little Acorns"	Jack White, Mort Crim (Note: Crim wrote the intro.)		4:09
11.	"Hypnotize"			1:48
12.	"The Air Near My Fingers"			3:40
13.	"Girl, You Have No Faith in Medicine"			3:18
14.	"It's True That We Love One Another"			2:43
Total length:				49:56

=== Notes ===
- The Japanese release of Elephant includes "Who's to Say" (Dan John Miller) and "Good to Me" (Brendan Benson, Jason Falkner) as bonus tracks.
- On some releases of Elephant, track 14 is mistitled as "Well It's True That We Love One Another".

== Personnel ==
Credits are adapted from the album's liner notes.

The White Stripes

- Jack White – vocals, guitar, piano, production, mixing
- Meg White – drums, vocals

Guest personnel

- Mort Crim – spoken word intro on "Little Acorns"
- Holly Golightly – vocal on "It's True That We Love One Another"

Production

- Liam Watson – engineering, mixing
- Miti – engineering (track 4)
- Noel Summerville – mastering

Artwork

- Bruce Brand – layout
- "The Third Man" – artwork
- Patrick Pantano – photography

== Charts ==
=== Weekly charts ===
2003 chart performance for Elephant
Chart (2003)	Peak position
Australian Albums (ARIA)	4
Austrian Albums (Ö3 Austria)	39
Belgian Albums (Ultratop Flanders)	11
Belgian Albums (Ultratop Wallonia)	11
Canadian Albums (Billboard)	5
Danish Albums (Hitlisten)	35
Dutch Albums (Album Top 100)	24
Finnish Albums (Suomen virallinen lista)	19
French Albums (SNEP)	21
German Albums (Offizielle Top 100)	27
Irish Albums (IRMA)	3
New Zealand Albums (RMNZ)	6
Norwegian Albums (VG-lista)	3
Scottish Albums (Official Charts)	1
Swedish Albums (Sverigetopplistan)	7
Swiss Albums (Schweizer Hitparade)	29
UK Albums (Official Charts)	1
US Billboard 200	6

2023 chart performance for Elephant
Chart (2023)	Peak position
German Albums (Offizielle Top 100)	19
Spanish Albums (Promusicae)	100

=== Year-end charts ===
2003 year-end chart performance for Elephant
Chart (2003)	Position
Australian Albums (ARIA)	45
Belgian Albums (Ultratop Flanders)	43
Belgian Albums (Ultratop Wallonia)	58
Dutch Albums (Album Top 100)	83
French Albums (SNEP)	137
German Albums (Offizielle Top 100)	75
New Zealand Albums (RMNZ)	16
Swedish Albums (Sverigetopplistan)	74
UK Albums (OCC)	22
US Billboard 200	57

2004 year-end chart performance for Elephant
Chart (2004)	Position
Belgian Albums (Ultratop Flanders)	57
French Albums (SNEP)	128
UK Albums (OCC)	153
US Billboard 200	173

== Certifications ==
Certifications and sales for Elephant
Region	Certification	Certified units/sales
Australia (ARIA)	2× Platinum	140,000^{^}
Belgium (BRMA)	Platinum	50,000^{*}
Canada (Music Canada)	3× Platinum	300,000^{‡}
Denmark (IFPI Danmark)	2× Platinum	40,000^{‡}
Germany (BVMI)	Gold	100,000^{‡}
Netherlands (NVPI)	Platinum	80,000^{^}
New Zealand (RMNZ)	Platinum	15,000^{^}
Norway (IFPI Norway)	Gold	20,000^{*}
Poland (ZPAV)	Gold	10,000^{‡}
Sweden (GLF)	Gold	30,000^{^}
United Kingdom (BPI)	3× Platinum	900,000^{‡}
United States (RIAA)	2× Platinum	2,100,000
Summaries
Europe (IFPI)	Platinum	1,000,000^{*}
Worldwide	—	4,000,000
^{*} Sales figures based on certification alone.^{^} Shipments figures based on certification alone.^{‡} Sales+streaming figures based on certification alone.
