= Ball and Biscuit =

2003 song by The White Stripes

Song by the White Stripes

from the album Elephant
- Released: April 1, 2003
- Recorded: April–May 2002
- Studio: Toe Rag (London)
- Genre: Blues rock; hard rock
- Length: 7:18
- Label: V2; XL; Third Man
- Composers: Jack White, Meg White
- Lyricist: Jack White
- Producer: Jack White

"Ball and Biscuit" is a song by American rock duo the White Stripes from their fourth studio album, Elephant (2003). Written by Jack White and composed by the duo, the song was conceived with the purpose of incorporating "fat, dirty, ear-destroying guitar sounds" into the album. Musically, it is a blues rock and hard rock song with lyrics about a self-proclaimed seventh son courting a woman. It is the longest studio recording by the band, lasting over seven minutes.

== Recording ==
The White Stripes, an American rock duo composed of guitarist/vocalist Jack White and drummer Meg White, gained international recognition with their third studio album, White Blood Cells. After their rise to fame, they began to create material for their follow-up record, Elephant. "Ball and Biscuit" was one of eleven songs recorded for Elephant through April and May 2002 at Toe Rag Studios in Hackney, London. Jack wrote the song after "some higher power said to me that now, Jack White, is the time to start playing guitar solos."

== Composition ==
"Ball and Biscuit" is characterized as a blues rock and hard rock song with a length of 7 minutes and 18 seconds, the longest studio recording by the band. According to sheet music published by Universal Music Publishing Group, the song is composed in 4/4 time and the key of E minor, with a tempo of 74 beats per minute. It commits to the structure of traditional 12-bar blues, a three-chord format in which the first line of each verse is repeated and then answered. It features "fat, dirty, ear-destroying" riffs and numerous guitar solos.

The lyrics of "Ball and Biscuit" , written by Jack, follow the perspective of a self-purported seventh son as he courts a woman who is ambivalent towards his advances. He mentions that it is "quite possible" that he is her "third man" and persistently tries to impress her with his claim of being a seventh son. He was inspired by his passing thoughts and family situation, being the seventh and final son in a family of ten children, and aimed to "mak[e] fun of cockiness. It kind of disgusts me when you see that in our environment, that it's so attractive to women—that cockiness." The title comes from a STC microphone, nicknamed the "Apple and Biscuit" or "Ball and Biscuit", used during the production of the album.

== Reception ==
While "Ball and Biscuit" was never released as a standalone single, it was promotionally released in October 2020 ahead of The White Stripes Greatest Hits compilation album, and earned a visualizer in 2023. It has generated a significant amount of commentary and was received positively by critics. In her review of Elephant, Kitty Empire described the song as "...astonishing, with Jack White playing on his knees, his sexual promises punctuated by liquid guitar emissions." The Washington Post's David Malitz described the song as "perhaps the White Stripes' definitive statement". VICE's Jake Uitti deemed "Ball and Biscuit" as the best track on Elephant and the "most perfect" White Stripes song, praising "Jack with his self-seriousness and Meg with her sharp-yet-daydreaming vibes."

== Legacy ==
"Ball and Biscuit" has been used numerous times in popular culture. It was featured in as the background music for the Captain Morgan advertisement "Glass". It was used in the beginning of the film The Social Network (2010).

Bob Dylan performed the song live at a concert in Detroit, Michigan on March 17, 2004, for which he was joined by White (making a surprise appearance). An audience recording of the performance was briefly made available to stream on the White Stripes' official website in March 2004. A soundboard recording of the performance received an official release as a 7-inch single in the fourth quarter of 2023 via White's Third Man Records.

In 2012, "Ball and Biscuit" was voted in a Rolling Stone poll to be Jack's greatest recording "by a landslide". In 2026, the same publication placed it on their list of the "100 Greatest Guitar Solos of All Time" at number 35.
