= Bel Comeau =

British composer

- Born: Benjamin Comeau; 1993 (age 32–33)
- Occupations: Composer, pianist and organist

Benjamin "Bel" Comeau (born 1993) is a British composer, pianist and organist, whose work combines classical, jazz and contemporary music.

== Biography ==
Comeau was born in 1993 and grew up in Truro, Cornwall. As a child, they sang with the choir at Truro Cathedral, becoming interested in Bach and jazz music. They obtained an LRSM diploma with distinction in piano, and a Royal College of Organists diploma. In 2011, they won the first Northern Ireland International Organ Competition, playing their own arrangement of Igor Stravinsky's Firebird Suite. They studied at Girton College, Cambridge, where they were the college organ scholar, and graduated with a Bachelor of Arts in music in 2014. They gained a postgraduate degree in music from the Guildhall School of Music and Drama.

Comeau's concerts mix classical, jazz and contemporary music including Björk and Pink Floyd. In 2015, they composed and performed a 45-minute piano sonata in the style of a fictitious student of Franz Liszt in the 1880s. They have composed and performed several works for BBC Radio Three, playing piano and organ.

In 2018, Comeau uploaded to YouTube a four-part fugue arranged for soprano, alto, tenor and bass with the words "Donald Trump is a Wanker", set to the tune of The White Stripes' "Seven Nation Army". They sold the fugue's score online, with proceeds going towards "organisations combating the more odious policies of the Trump administration." They uploaded a similar fugue to YouTube the following year, "Boris Johnson is a Lying Shit" in the run up to the 2019 general election. The video had been played over 100,000 times by election day.
