= In the Cold, Cold Night =

"In the Cold, Cold, Night"

Song by the White Stripes

from the album Elephant
- Released: April 1, 2003
- Recorded: April–May 2002
- Studio: Toe Rag Studios, London
- Genre: Alternative rock; blues rock; garage rock
- Length: 2:58
- Label: V2; XL; Third Man
- Composers: Jack White, Meg White
- Lyricist: Jack White
- Producer: Jack White

"In the Cold, Cold Night" is a song by American rock duo the White Stripes from their fourth studio album, Elephant (2003). Written by Jack White and composed by the duo, the song was conceived specifically for Meg White to sing, marking her first lead vocal performance for the band. Musically, it features a minimal soundscape and lyrics about a woman awaiting her lover's return.

Though never released as a single, "In the Cold, Cold Night" earned positive reviews from critics, who considered it a highlight of the band's discography for its atmosphere and Meg's rare leading position. Journalists have suggested the song highlights her significance in debates about her role in the band.

== Recording ==
The White Stripes made their recording debut in 1998 with the single "Let's Shake Hands", and Jack White was established as the duo's guitarist and lead vocalist and Meg White their drummer. She only performed background vocals for the band's second and third studio albums, De Stijl and White Blood Cells respectively, and shared vocal duties with Jack on the Loretta Lynn cover "Rated X" which features as the B-side to their 2001 single "Hotel Yorba". After the band's international breakthrough with White Blood Cells, they began to create material for their fourth studio album, Elephant.

"In the Cold, Cold Night" was one of eleven songs recorded through April and May 2002 at Toe Rag Studios in Hackney, London. Jack wrote the lyrics specifically for Meg to sing, marking the first time Meg recorded leading vocals on any work of the band to that point. To gain confidence in her singing abilities, she sang during their live performances and covered the Velvet Underground's "After Hours". Meg would sing lead once more on "Passive Manipulation" in their follow-up album Get Behind Me Satan (2005), and deliver a spoken-word performance on the bagpipe-heavy track "St. Andrew (This Battle Is in the Air)" in Icky Thump (2007).

== Composition ==
"In the Cold, Cold Night"
15-second sample from the intro of "In the Cold, Cold Night"

"In the Cold, Cold Night" is an alternative rock, blues rock, and garage rock song, inspired by the rock band Mazzy Star and the jazz singer Peggy Lee. Unlike the band's prior work, the song does not have any percussion and features a minimalist soundscape of guitars and bass pedals of a Hammond organ. It is written in the key of D minor with a tempo of 112 beats per minute, and Meg's voice ranges from soprano to mezzo-soprano. The song is about a young—and possibly inexperienced—woman pleading for her lover to return, though its lyrics have been interpreted multiple ways. Critics described it as having a cryptic atmosphere.

== Release ==
"In the Cold, Cold Night" was never released as a standalone single, but it was used as the B-side to "Seven Nation Army" in releases from 2003 to 2013, and earned a visualizer in 2023. It was a staple of the White Stripes' live performances and was frequently performed by the band from 2003 onwards. Notable performances of the song include those at the Aragon Ballroom in 2003, Madison Square Garden in 2007, and during their 2007 Canada Summer Tour featured in the documentary Under Great White Northern Lights (2009).

== Reception ==
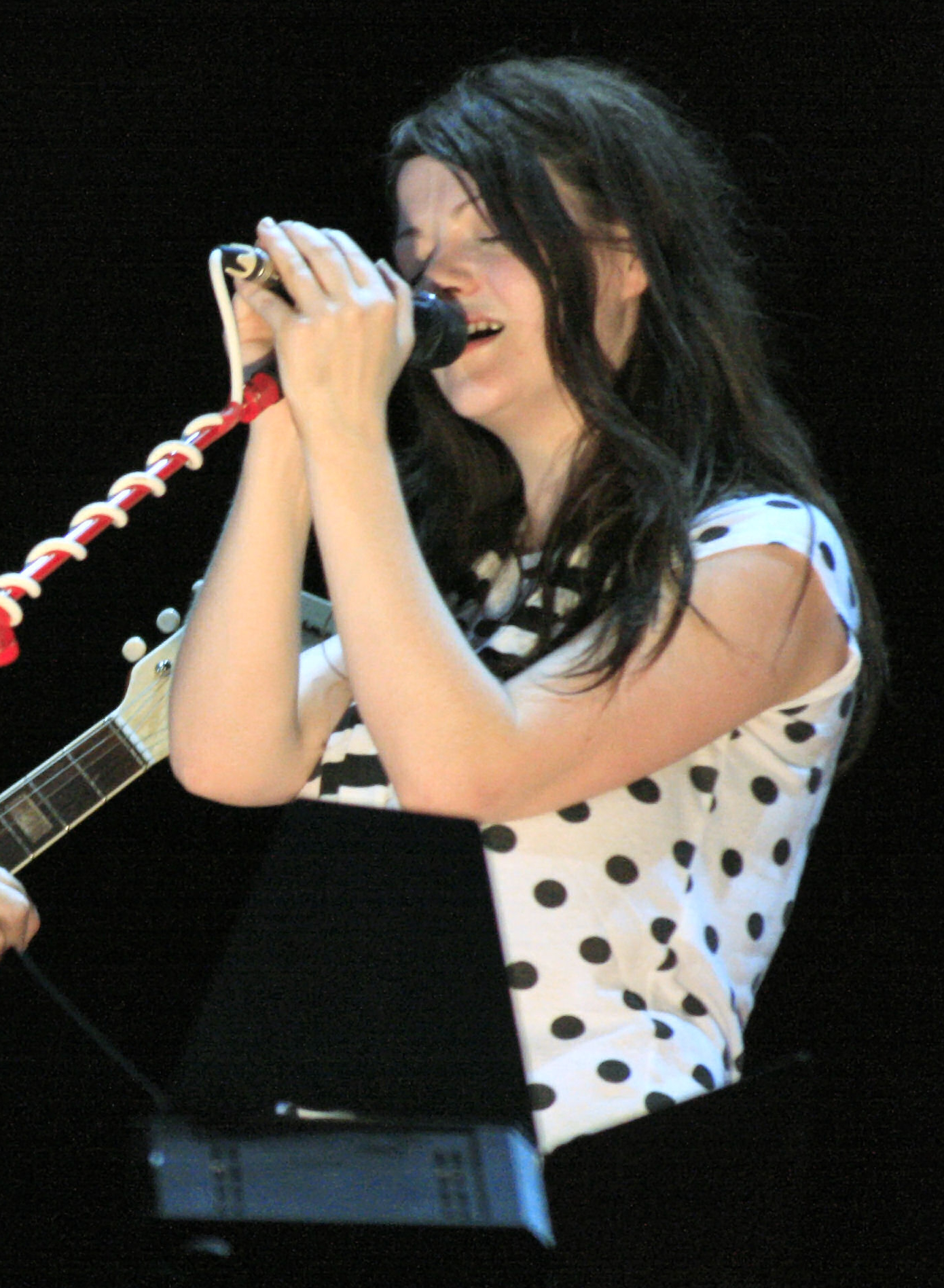
Meg White's (pictured in 2007) first time singing lead was praised.

"In the Cold, Cold Night" has received positive reviews from music critics of the time and retrospectively. AllMusic's Tom Maginnis and The New York Times's Jon Pareles both likened the song to Little Willie John's "Fever". They praised the atmosphere of the track and Meg's vocals, with the latter calling it memorable and "uncharacteristic". Matt Harvey of BBC said that "Meg speaks and (unlike her drumming) comes across all fey and, well, sort of pre-Raphaelite in a down-town Motor City kind of way. [...] it's all so divinely confident, so sexy." Alexis Petridis of The Guardian called her vocals "childlike", praising its "stark, unaffected quality" and its "radical departure" from the band's usual sound. Brent DiCrescenzo of Pitchfork likened her voice to "a coy Mo Tucker or Georgia Hubley–more so than take-no-sass Patsy Cline or Dusty in Memphis."

Eric Alper believed "In the Cold, Cold Night" allowed Meg to prove her worth amidst the contemporary debate regarding her role in the band. He described her vocals as "soft, haunting" and the track as "a vulnerable moment that added emotional depth to the record." Petridis ranked it among the band's best songs and called it "her finest moment not as the White Stripes' drummer, but their vocalist". Cat Clyde wrote in a retrospective review of Elephant for Spin: "I loved that Meg's voice was timid. It felt so real. [...] I still feel today it's such a perfect recording." Stephen Trageser of Nashville Scene believed the song has an "unsettling, ambiguous sentiment" with a "determined creepiness". Staff at The Quietus wrote: "her (Meg's) clear-voiced invocations of flickering flame carnality exude a shy, eye-of-the-storm poise which contrasts beautifully with the high voltage drama that hallmarks the song's chart-topping parent album (Elephant)". Tom Breihan of Stereogum believed Meg "brings a magnetic remoteness" and called it "beautifully weird".

== Personnel ==
Credits are adapted from the liner notes of Elephant.

The White Stripes

- Meg White – vocals, drums
- Jack White – guitar, keyboards, production, mixing

Additional personnel

- Liam Watson – engineering, mixing
- Noel Summerville – mastering

== Other versions ==
- In 2010, Rose Hill Drive covered the song live at the Fox Theatre.
- In 2012, Tracey Thorn included a cover of the song on her Christmas album Tinsel and Lights.
- In 2013, Wanda Jackson and Shooter Jennings covered the song for the compilation Rockin' Legends Pay Tribute to Jack White.
