= MSC Magnifica =

Musica-class cruise ship

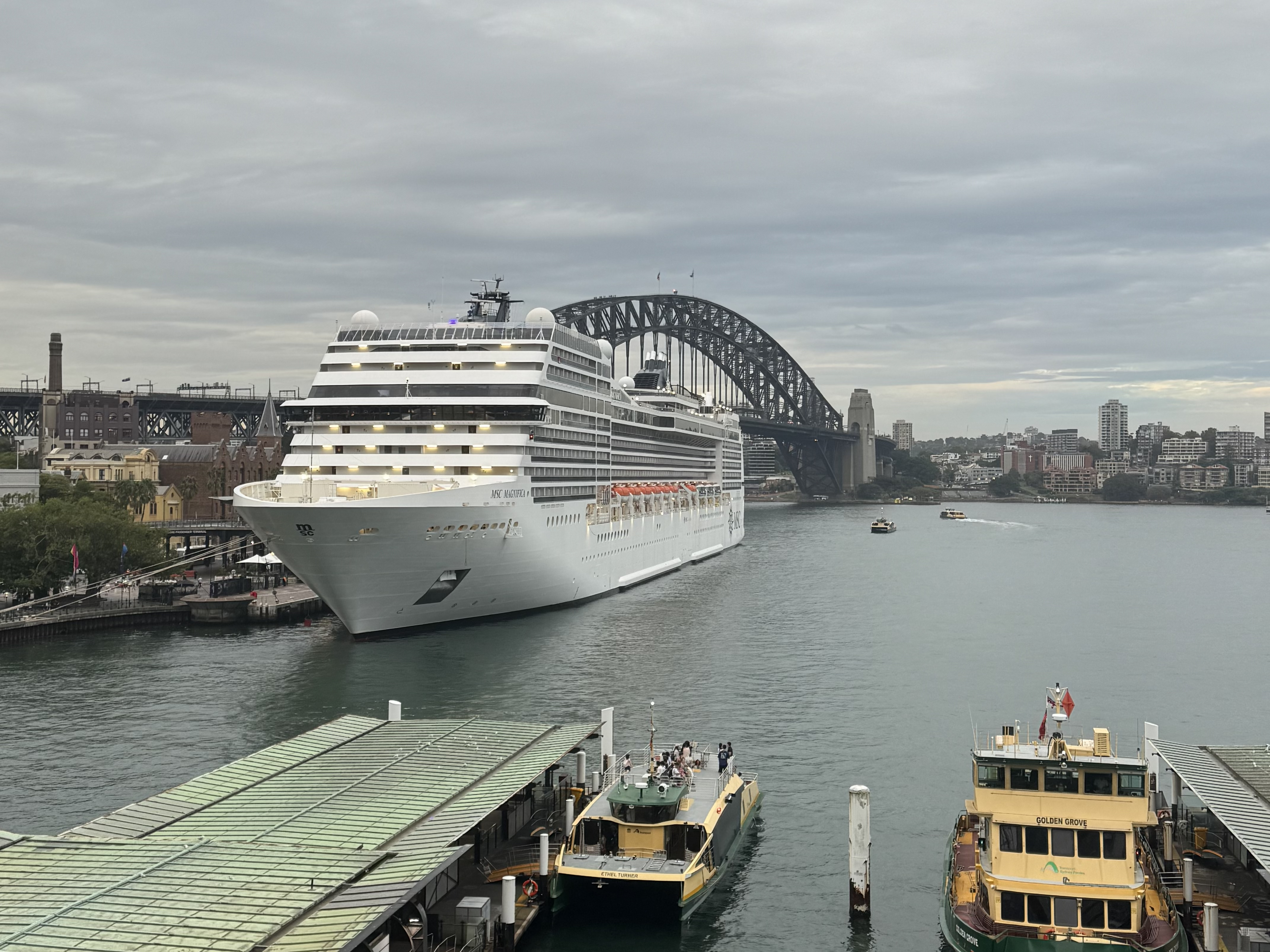
- MSC Magnifica docked at Sydney, Australia on 3 March 2026 as part of her 2026 World Cruise.

History
- Name: MSC Magnifica
- Owner: Mediterranean Shipping Company S.A.
- Operator: MSC Cruises
- Port of registry: Panama City, Panama
- Builder: STX Europe (Saint-Nazaire, France)
- Cost: $547 million
- Yard number: T32
- Launched: 16 January 2009
- Christened: 6 March 2010 in Hamburg
- Maiden voyage: 9 March 2010
- Identification: Call sign: 3FLO4; IMO number: 9387085; MMSI number: 352594000
- Status: In service

General characteristics
- Class & type: Musica-class cruise ship
- Tonnage: 95,128 GT
- Length: 299 m (981 ft 0 in)
- Beam: 34.3 m (112 ft 6 in)
- Draught: 8.15 m (26 ft 9 in)
- Decks: 16 decks
- Speed: 23 knots (43 km/h; 26 mph)
- Capacity: 2,550 (double occupancy); 3,223 (maximum occupancy)
- Crew: 1,027

MSC Magnifica is a Musica-class cruise ship operated by MSC Cruises. Constructed by STX Europe in Saint-Nazaire, the ship was launched in January 2009, completed in January 2010, and entered service in March 2010.

MSC Cruises announced the suspension of all North American itineraries until 30 June 2020 due to the COVID-19 pandemic.

== Design and description ==
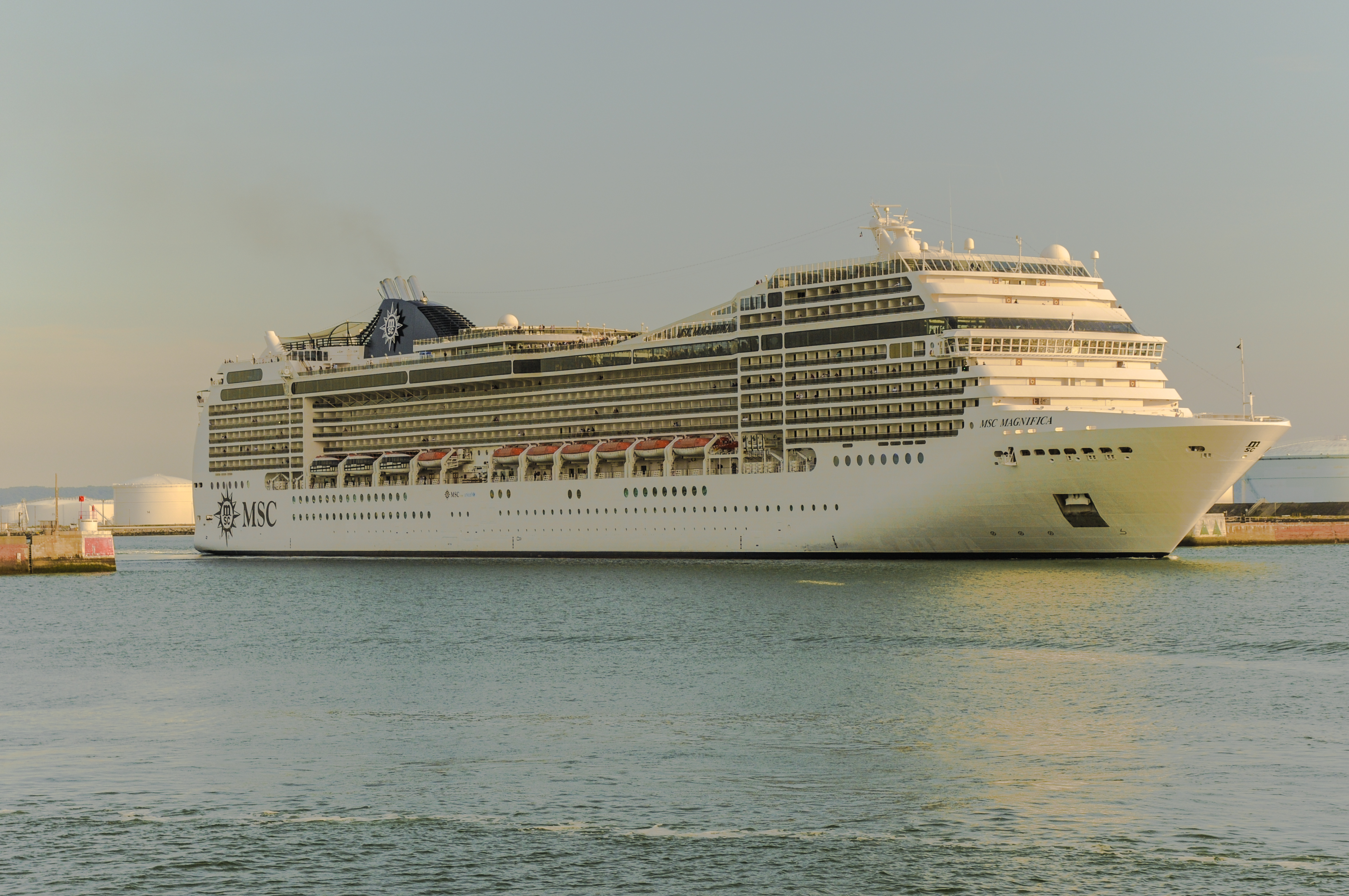
MSC Magnifica at Le Havre, France on 29 August 2013.

The fourth ship to be built to the Musica-class design, MSC Magnifica was constructed by STX Europe in their shipyard at Saint-Nazaire, France. She was built at a cost of $547 million.

The vessel is 293.8 metres (963 ft 11 in) long, with a beam of 32.2 metres (105 ft 8 in). The 93,330-gross ton vessel can reach a maximum speed of 23 knots (43 km/h; 26 mph). MSC Magnifica has 1,259 cabins – 2,550 passengers can be carried at double occupancy, while 3,605 can be carried at full capacity. The ship has 1,027 crew.

=== Facilities ===
The ship has 13 passenger accessible decks, three swimming pools, a gymnasium, spa, and wellness center, a 1,250-seat Art Deco-style theatre, casino, cinema, bowling alley and a number of dining areas and bars.

=== Refit ===
On 10 September 2019, it was announced that MSC Magnifica would be dry-docked for two months starting March 2021, to be refurbished and stretched by 23 metres (75 ft 6 in). The 140 million euro renovation will bring two new restaurants, a new shopping area, a new water park, 215 new cabins (92 with balcony), and the most modern ecological systems: a state-of-the-art Selective Catalytic Reduction (SCR) system and next-generation Advanced Wastewater Treatment (AWT) system. The vessel will also get a shore-power system.

== Construction and career ==
MSC Magnifica was identified by the shipyard hull number T32 during construction. MSC Magnifica's onboard disco is named after her shipyard hull number.

MSC Magnifica was floated out of her dry dock in a launching ceremony on 16 January 2009. A 72-hour sea trial period was completed on 17 January 2010. A flag-changing ceremony was held on 25 February 2010 in Saint-Nazaire. The ship was christened on 6 March 2010 at a ceremony in Hamburg by the godmother to the MSC Cruises fleet, Italian actress Sophia Loren.

MSC Magnifica received criticism in April 2014 after it was revealed that Brazilian police had to rescue eleven crew members on board that were living in 'slave-like conditions' whilst docked in Salvador, Brazil.

On 9 May 2014, during the celebration of the 825th Hamburg Port Anniversary, the song "Seven Nation Army" was played using the horns of MSC Magnifica as it entered the harbor.

On 5 January 2019, MSC Magnifica began her first World Cruise. The ship departed from Genoa and sailed for 119. MSC Magnifica visited 6 continents, 32 countries and 49 destinations. The ship returned to Genoa on 3 May 2019.

MSC Magnifica undertook a second World Cruise leaving in January 2020. The 116-night cruise started at Genoa on 5 January 2020 and intended to call at 43 ports in 23 countries. The vessel was scheduled to end her World Cruise in Genoa on 30 April 2020.

== Incidents ==
=== Coronavirus pandemic ===
On 23 March 2020, the ship was headed for Fremantle, Western Australia, for refueling and resupplying, but was denied permission to dock because authorities wrongly believed there were COVID-19 patients on board; the crew denied having any cases of the virus on board.

The ship was not allowed to dock in Dubai, and instead on 6 April made a "technical stop" in Colombo, Sri Lanka, where a 75-year-old German heart patient and a Sri Lankan chef, who had made a successful plea on social media to be allowed to repatriate himself, were disembarked. The Sri Lanka Navy took charge of them; On 14 April, the German woman who evacuated the ship died.

On 20 April 2020, MSC Magnifica docked in Marseille, France, letting out all its passengers and terminating the cruise. MSC Cruises stated that no passengers and no crew members had shown any coronavirus symptoms. Some passengers had previously disembarked in Australia in mid-March and planned to fly to Europe, according to one report. The rest of the ship's guests had continued to France.
