= Beat Assailant =

American musical artist

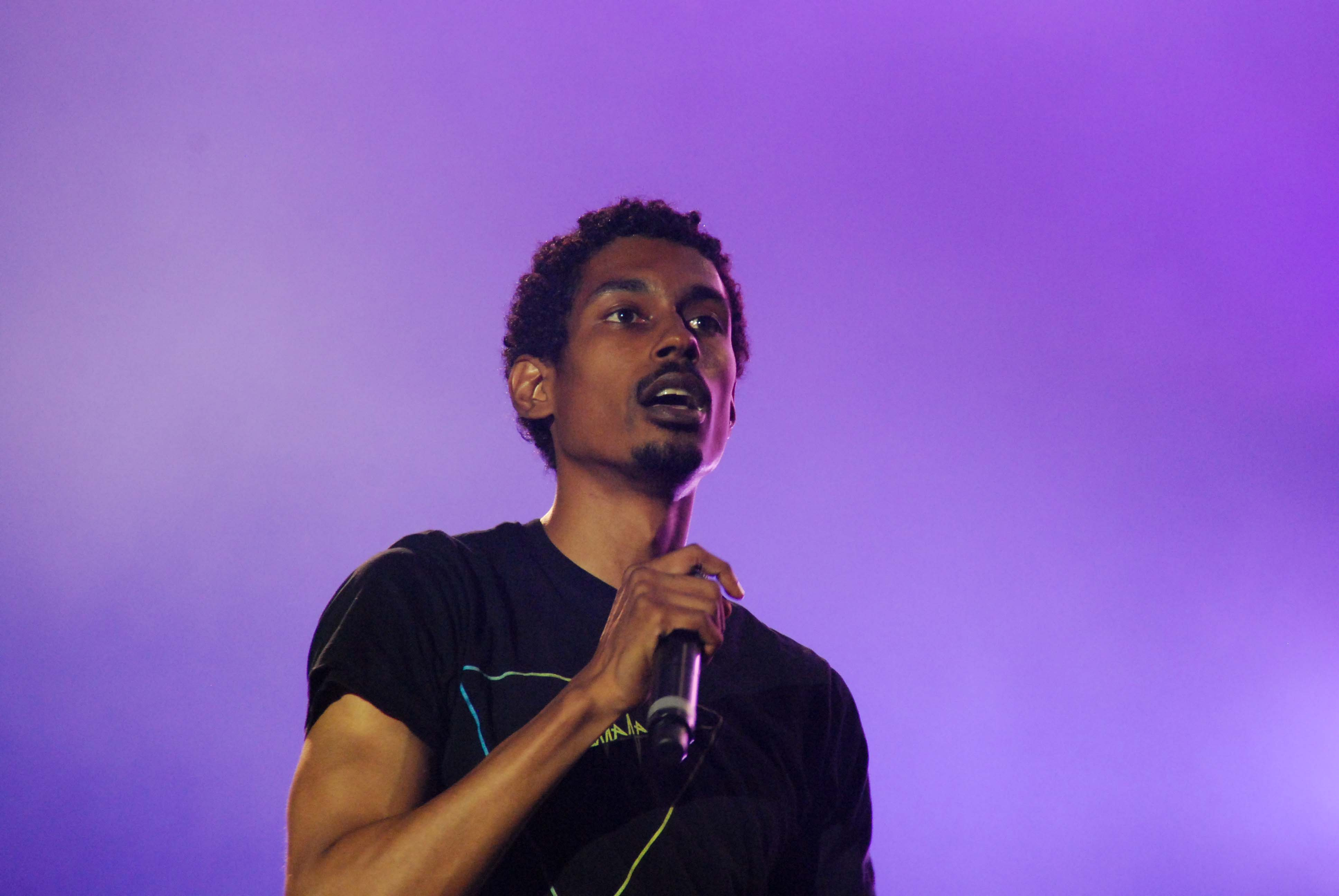
Beat Assailant performing in 2009

Adam Lamb Turner (born 1977 in Miami), known by his stage name Beat Assailant, is an American musical artist known for fusing hip hop with jazz, funk, and other musical genres, which Celeste Rhoads of Allmusic writes "push the boundaries of hip-hop". Rain or Shine, a song off his 2012 album B, is featured in a commercial for the 2013 Nissan Juke.

== Biography ==
Born in Miami, Florida, Turner moved to Paris, where he recorded Hard Twelve, produced by Dany Wild ("Max"). Afterward he began experimenting with a big band format. He spent much of 2007 and 2008 on the road with a nine-piece band, with which he recorded Imperial Pressure. Discordance said the album was of great class, and mixed hip-hop, jazz, rock, and electronic music in an intelligent manner. His third album, Rhyme Space Continuum, was praised for its "vocal acrobatics".

== Discography ==
=== Albums ===
- 2004: Hard Twelve (Twin Fizz Records / Wagram)
- 2008: Imperial Pressure (Dirty Dozen Records/Notre P'tite Entreprise/Discograph)
- 2009: Rhyme Space Continuum (Discograph)
- 2012: B (Discograph)
- 2014: City Never Sleeps
- 2019: The System

=== Singles ===
- 2004: "Hard Twelve - The Ante"
- 2004: "I Like Cash"
- 2008: "Better Than Us"
- 2009: "Spy Feat Ben l'Oncle Soul"
- 2012: "Rain or Shine"
- 2014: "Run"
- 2014: "Story O' my LF feat Shaka Ponk"
