= There's No Home for You Here =

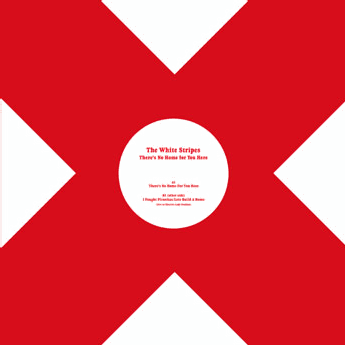

Single by the White Stripes

from the album Elephant
- B-side: "I Fought Piranhas" / "Let's Build a Home" (live)
- Released: March 15, 2004
- Recorded: April 2002
- Studio: Toe Rag (London)
- Length: 3:43
- Label: XL
- Composers: Jack White, Meg White
- Lyricist: Jack White
- Producer: Jack White

The White Stripes singles chronology
"I Just Don't Know What to Do with Myself" (2003)	"There's No Home for You Here" (2004)	"Jolene" (2004)

"There's No Home for You Here" is a song by American alternative rock band the White Stripes, featured on their fourth studio album, Elephant (2003). It was released as the fourth single from the album on March 15, 2004, in the United Kingdom. The B-side of the 7-inch vinyl record is a medley of "I Fought Piranhas" and "Let's Build a Home" – from The White Stripes (1999) and De Stijl (2000), respectively – recorded at Electric Lady Studios on November 16, 2003. The single failed to chart. Of the track, Jack said, "Our idea was to see how far we could go with an eight track recorder, and I think how far we went is too far."

== Track listing ==
Side A
No.	Title	Writer(s)	Length
1.	"There's No Home for You Here"	Jack White	3:43

Side B
No.	Title	Writer(s)	Length
1.	"I Fought Piranhas" / "Let's Build a Home" (live at Electric Lady Studios)	The White Stripes	5:14

== Personnel ==
The White Stripes

- Jack White – vocals, guitar, piano, production, mixing
- Meg White – drums, choirs

Additional personnel

- Liam Watson – engineering, mixing
- Noel Summerville – mastering
