= Ben l'Oncle Soul =

French soul singer and songwriter (born 1984)

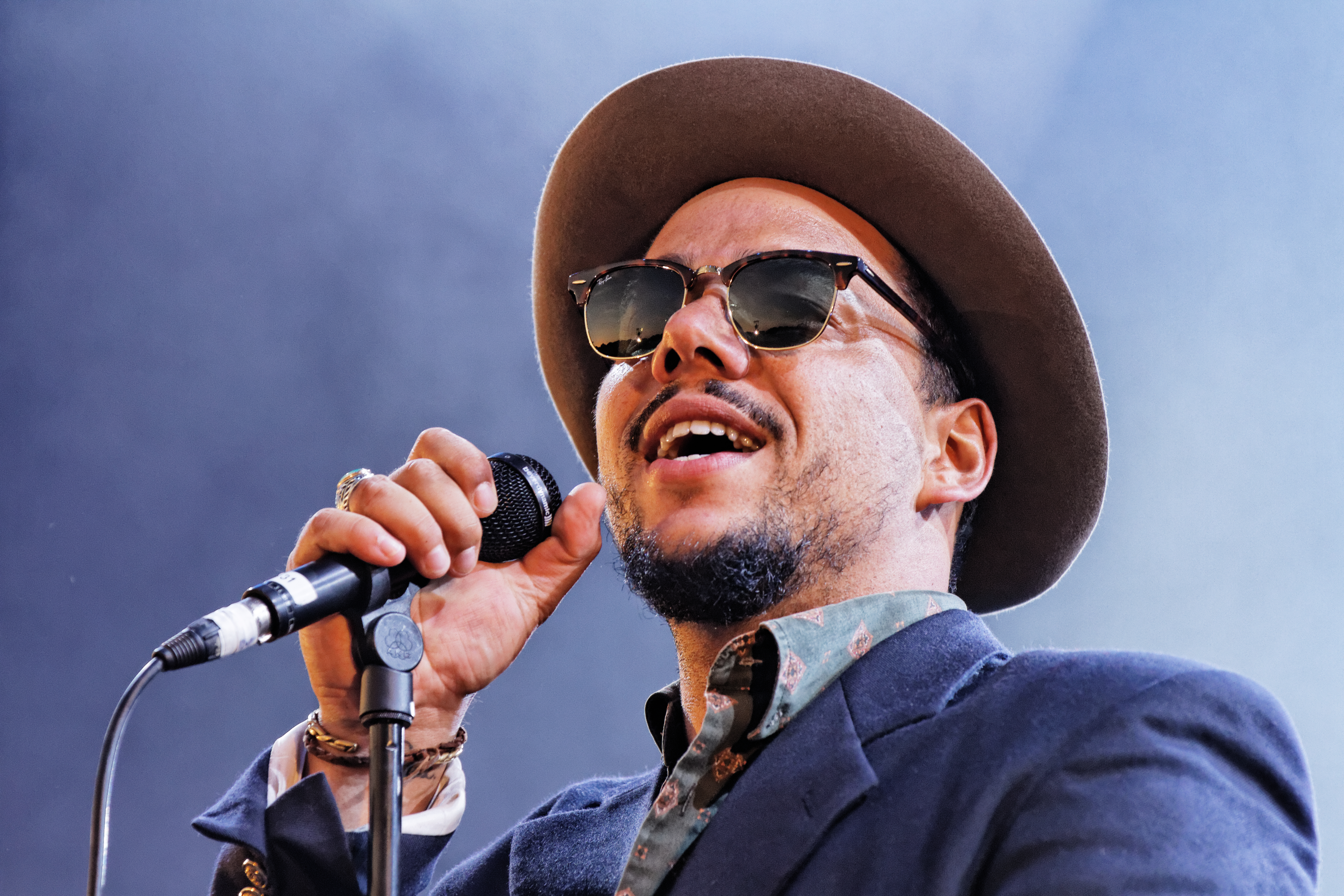
- Ben l'Oncle Soul performing at the 2014 Festival du Bout du Monde

Background information
- Also known as: L'Oncle Ben
- Born: Benjamin Duterde; 10 November 1984 (age 41); Chambray-lès-Tours, Centre, France
- Genres: Soul; pop; indie-soul; R&B
- Occupations: Singer, songwriter
- Years active: 2005–present
- Labels: Motown, Blue Note, Decca

Benjamin Duterde (French pronunciation: [bɛ̃ʒamɛ̃ dytɛʁd]; born 10 November 1984), better known by his stage name Ben l'Oncle Soul (French: [bɛn lɔ̃klə sul], lit. 'Ben the Soul Uncle'), is a French soul singer and songwriter. He has released four studio albums, the self-titled debut Ben l'Oncle Soul in 2010, À coup de rêves in 2014, Under My Skin in 2016, Addicted to You in 2020, and Red Mango in 2022. He released his 5th studio album "SAD GENERATION" in March of 2025.

== Career ==
After graduating in 2004, he started singing in a gospel group called Fitiavana. His friends called him "l'Oncle Ben" because he was often wearing a bow tie like Uncle Ben from Uncle Ben's Rice. But he decided to change the name in 2009, shortly before the release of his first EP, Soul Wash: Lesson 1, to avoid copyright problems. His eponymous debut album, Ben l'Oncle Soul, was released by Motown Records in 2010.

On 25 June 2011, Ben l'Oncle Soul opened the 32nd edition of the Montreal Jazz Festival in a major free concert in front of more than 10,000 people at the Scène TD de la place des Festivals in the heart of Montreal. The concert was his third appearance in Montreal having performed at the 2010 FrancoFolies and at the 2011 Montréal High Lights Festival. He performed at North Sea Jazz Festival on 9 July 2011, and appeared on Later... with Jools Holland on BBC 2 on 21 October 2011. As part of the London Jazz Festival, he played at the Queen Elizabeth Hall in the Southbank Centre, London, on 12 November 2011.

In 2014, Ben l'Oncle Soul released his second studio album, À coup de rêves. His third album, Under My Skin, was released in 2016, and Addicted to You in 2020.

== Discography ==
=== Studio albums ===
Year	Album details	Peak positions					Certification
Year	Album details	BEL Wa	FR	GER	NED	SWI	Certification
2010	Ben l'Oncle Soul	11	4	81	12	37	France: 3× Platinum
2014	À coup de rêves	14	7	—	50	21	
2016	Under My Skin	154	60	—	—	—	
2020	Addicted to You	—	140	—	—	—	
2022	Red Mango	—	—	—	—	—	

=== Live albums ===
Year	Album details	Peak positions	
Year	Album details	BEL Wa	FR
2011	Live Paris	25	32

=== EPs ===
- 2009: Soul Wash: Lesson 1
- 2019: Ben
- 2023: Is it You?

=== Singles ===
Year	Single	Peak positions						Album
Year	Single	BEL Vl	BEL Wa	FR	GER	NED	SWI	Album
2010	"Seven Nation Army"	—	16	—	51	57	54	Ben l'Oncle Soul
2010	"Soulman"	—	16	14	—	39	63	Ben l'Oncle Soul
2011	"Petite sœur"	—	40	54	—	—	—	Ben l'Oncle Soul
2011	"Elle me dit"	—	31* (Ultratip)	—	—	—	—	Ben l'Oncle Soul
2013	"Hallelujah!!! (J'ai tant besoin de toi)"	22* (Ultratip)	33* (Ultratip)	68	—	—	—	À coup de rêves
2013	"Être un homme comme vous"	—	—	94	—	—	—	We Love Disney
2014–2015	"You Got My Back"	—	—	75	—	—	—	À coup de rêves
2014–2015	"Ailleurs"	—	—	67	—	—	—	À coup de rêves
2014–2015	"So Hard to Find"	—	—	53	—	—	—	À coup de rêves
2014–2015	"À coup de rêves"	—	—	40	—	—	—	À coup de rêves
2017	"Strangers In The Night"	—	—	—	—	—	—	non-album single
2019	"Next To You"	—	—	—	—	—	—	Ben
2019	"I Don't Wanna Go"	—	—	—	—	—	—	Ben & Addicted To You
2020	"Next To You" featuring Yuna	—	—	—	—	—	—	Addicted To You
2020	"All My Life" featuring Iam	—	—	—	—	—	—	Addicted To You
2022	"Stay"	—	—	—	—	—	—	Red Mango
2022	"Imagine"	—	—	—	—	—	—	Red Mango
2022	"Levitate"	—	—	—	—	—	—	Is it You?
2022	"Sky has open Doors"	—	—	—	—	—	—	Is it You?
2023	"A Rose..."	—	—	—	—	—	—	Is it You?

*Did not appear in the official Belgian Ultratop 50 charts, but rather in the bubbling under Ultratip charts.

=== Features ===
Year	Single	Charts	Album
Year	Single	FR	Album
2010	"À mi-chemin" (Hocus Pocus featuring Akhenaton and Ben l'Oncle Soul)	70	

== Awards and nominations ==
- 2010: Nominated for the Prix Constantin for Ben l'Oncle Soul
- 2010: Nominated for La Chanson de l'année (The Song of the Year) for "Soulman"
- 2011: Nominated for Francophone Breakthrough of the Year for Ben l'Oncle Soul at the NRJ Music Awards
- 2011: Won for Best Male Singer of the Year at the Globes de Cristal
- 2011: Won for Live Breakthrough at the Victoires de la musique
- 2011: Nominated for Breakthrough of the Public at the Victoires de la musique
- 2011: Nominated for Album of the Year for Ben l'Oncle Soul at the Victoires de la musique
- 2011: Nominated for Music Video of the Year for "Soulman" at the Victoires de la musique
- 2011: Nominated for Best French Artist for Ben l'Oncle Soul at the MTV Europe Music Awards
- 2012: Won for European Border Breakers Award
