= List of awards and nominations received by the White Stripes =

The White Stripes awards and nominations
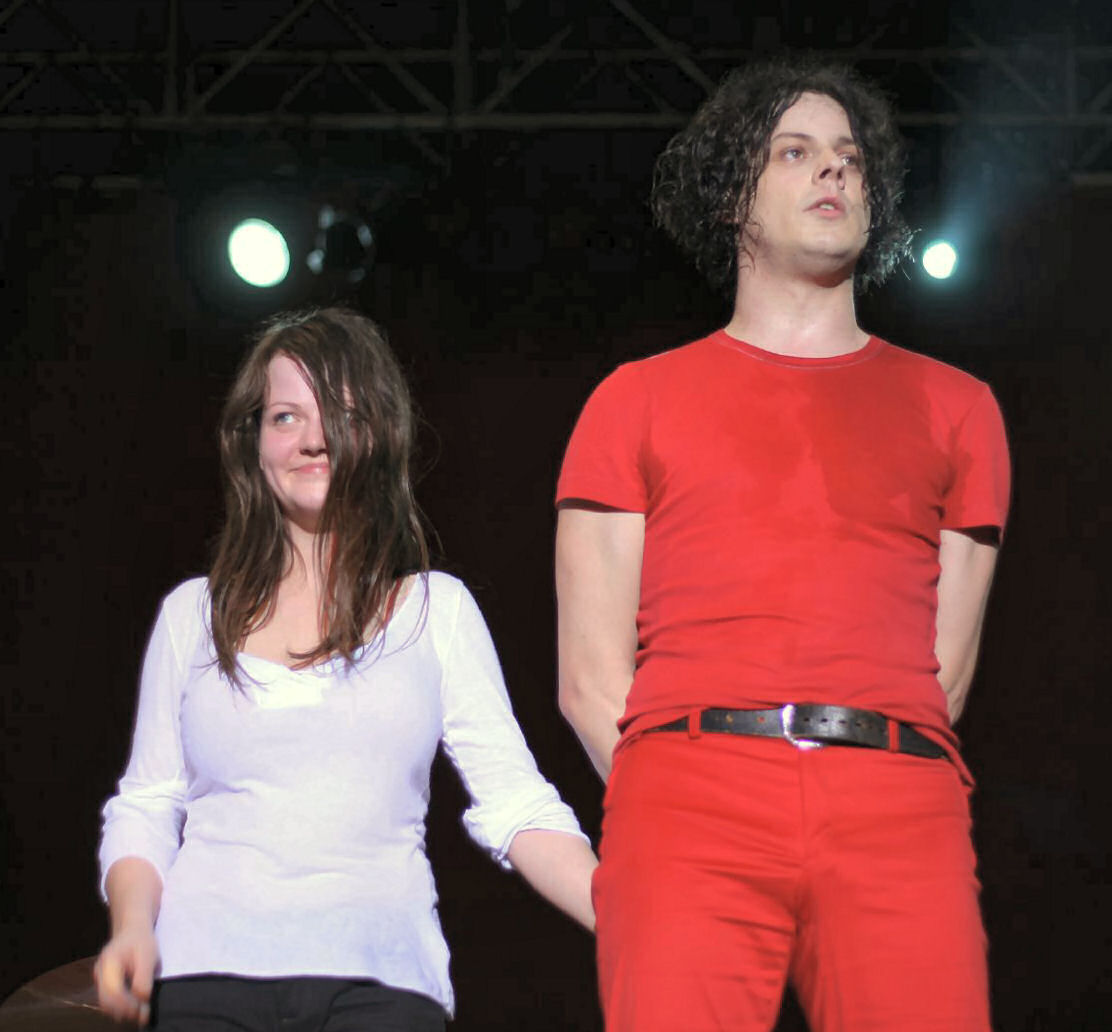
- Meg White and Jack White of the White Stripes at the 2007 Primavera Sound in Barcelona, Spain
Awards and nominations
Award	Wins	Nominations
American Music Awards	0	1
Brit	1	6
Grammy	6	12
Meteor Music	1	2
MTV Europe	1	7
MTV VMA	5	18
NME	1	9

Totals (Note: Certain award groups do not simply award one winner. They acknowledge several different recipients, have runners-up, and have third place. Since this is a specific recognition and is different from losing an award, runner-up mentions are considered wins in this award tally. For simplification and to avoid errors, each award in this list has been presumed to have had a prior nomination.)
- Wins: 19
- Nominations: 69

The White Stripes were an American alternative rock band formed in 1997 from Detroit, Michigan. The band consisted of guitarist and lead vocalist Jack White, and drummer Meg White who also occasionally sang. They have received several accolades, including a Brit Award and six Grammy Awards. Overall, the White Stripes have won 19 awards from 69 nominations.

The duo released their first two albums, The White Stripes (1999) and De Stijl (2000), to limited success; it was their third album, White Blood Cells (2001), that pushed the band into the public eye. The album's success was boosted by the single "Fell in Love with a Girl" and its subsequent music video, which won three MTV Video Music Awards. Their fourth album, Elephant (2003), went multi-platinum in four territories and won the Grammy Awards for Best Alternative Music Album and Best Rock Song. Elephant produced four singles including "Seven Nation Army", which became the band's most enduring work and a stadium anthem.

The White Stripes' later albums, Get Behind Me Satan (2005) and Icky Thump (2007), both won the Grammy Award for Best Alternative Music Album and charted in the top five of the Billboard 200. The title track of Icky Thump became the band's highest entry on the Billboard Hot 100. They also broke a Guinness World Record in 2009 for performing the shortest music concert. In 2011, the White Stripes disbanded. In 2025, the band were inducted into the Rock and Roll Hall of Fame; they were previously nominated in 2023 (their first year of eligibility).

== Awards and nominations ==
List of awards and nominations received by the White Stripes
Award	Year (Note: Indicates the year of ceremony. Each year is linked to the article about the awards held that year, wherever possible.)	Recipient(s) and nominee(s)	Category	Result	Ref.
American Music Awards	2007	The White Stripes	Best Rock/Alternative Artist	Nominated	
Brit Awards	2003	The White Stripes	International Breakthrough Act	Nominated	
Brit Awards	2003	The White Stripes	International Group	Nominated	
Brit Awards	2004	Elephant	International Album	Nominated	
Brit Awards	2004	The White Stripes	International Group	Won	
Brit Awards	2006	The White Stripes	International Group	Nominated	
Brit Awards	2008	The White Stripes	International Group	Nominated	
Chlotrudis Awards	2005	Coffee and Cigarettes	Best Cast	Nominated	
Detroit Music Awards	2002	White Blood Cells	Outstanding National Album	Won	
Detroit Music Awards	2002	"Hotel Yorba"	Outstanding National Single	Won	
Grammy Awards	2004	Elephant	Best Alternative Music Album	Won	
Grammy Awards	2004	Elephant	Album of the Year	Nominated	
Grammy Awards	2004	"Seven Nation Army"	Best Rock Performance by a Duo or Group with Vocal	Nominated	
Grammy Awards	2004	"Seven Nation Army"	Best Rock Song	Won	
Grammy Awards	2006	Get Behind Me Satan	Best Alternative Music Album	Won	
Grammy Awards	2006	"My Doorbell"	Best Pop Performance by a Duo or Group with Vocals	Nominated	
Grammy Awards	2008	Icky Thump	Best Alternative Music Album	Won	
Grammy Awards	2008	"Icky Thump"	Best Rock Performance by a Duo or Group with Vocal	Won	
Grammy Awards	2008	"Icky Thump"	Best Rock Song	Nominated	
Grammy Awards	2011	Under Great White Northern Lights	Best Boxed or Special Limited Edition Package	Won	
Grammy Awards	2011	Under Great White Northern Lights	Best Music Film	Nominated	
Grammy Awards	2017	"City Lights"	Best American Roots Song	Nominated	
Kerrang! Awards	2003	Elephant	Best Album	Nominated	
Meteor Music Awards	2004	Elephant	Best International Album	Won	
Meteor Music Awards	2004	The White Stripes	Best International Group	Nominated	
Meteor Music Awards	2006	The White Stripes	Best International Group	Nominated	
MTV Europe Music Awards	2002	"Fell in Love with a Girl"	Best Video	Nominated	
MTV Europe Music Awards	2003	The White Stripes	Best Rock	Won	
MTV Europe Music Awards	2003	The White Stripes	Best Group	Nominated	
MTV Europe Music Awards	2003	Elephant	Best Album	Nominated	
MTV Europe Music Awards	2003	"Seven Nation Army"	Best Video	Nominated	
MTV Europe Music Awards	2004	"The Hardest Button to Button"	Best Video	Nominated	
MTV Europe Music Awards	2005	The White Stripes	Best Alternative	Nominated	
MTV Video Music Awards	2002	"Fell in Love with a Girl"	Video of the Year	Nominated	
MTV Video Music Awards	2002	"Fell in Love with a Girl"	Breakthrough Video	Won	
MTV Video Music Awards	2002	"Fell in Love with a Girl"	Best Special Effects in a Video	Won	
MTV Video Music Awards	2002	"Fell in Love with a Girl"	Best Editing in a Video	Won	
MTV Video Music Awards	2003	"Seven Nation Army"	Best Group Video	Nominated	
MTV Video Music Awards	2003	"Seven Nation Army"	Best Rock Video	Nominated	
MTV Video Music Awards	2003	"Seven Nation Army"	Best Special Effects in a Video	Nominated	
MTV Video Music Awards	2003	"Seven Nation Army"	Best Editing in a Video	Won	
MTV Video Music Awards	2004	"The Hardest Button to Button"	Breakthrough Video	Nominated	
MTV Video Music Awards	2004	"The Hardest Button to Button"	Best Direction in a Video	Nominated	
MTV Video Music Awards	2004	"The Hardest Button to Button"	Best Special Effects in a Video	Nominated	
MTV Video Music Awards	2004	"The Hardest Button to Button"	Best Editing in a Video	Nominated	
MTV Video Music Awards	2005	"Blue Orchid"	Best Direction in a Video	Nominated	
MTV Video Music Awards	2005	"Blue Orchid"	Best Art Direction in a Video	Nominated	
MTV Video Music Awards	2005	"Blue Orchid"	Best Cinematography in a Video	Nominated	
MTV Video Music Awards	2007	The White Stripes	Best Group	Nominated	
MTV Video Music Awards	2008	"Conquest"	Best Art Direction in a Video	Nominated	
MTV Video Music Awards	2008	"Conquest"	Best Cinematography in a Video	Won	
MuchMusic Video Awards	2002	"Fell in Love with a Girl"	Best International Video – Group	Nominated	
MuchMusic Video Awards	2003	"Seven Nation Army"	Best International Video – Group	Won	
MuchMusic Video Awards	2003	The White Stripes	Favorite International Group	Nominated	
NME Awards	2002	The White Stripes	Best Band	Nominated	
NME Awards	2002	The White Stripes	Best New Act	Nominated	
NME Awards	2004	"Seven Nation Army"	Best Single	Won	
NME Awards	2004	The White Stripes	Best International Band	Nominated	
NME Awards	2004	Elephant	Best Album	Nominated	
NME Awards	2004	"The Hardest Button to Button"	Best Video	Nominated	
NME Awards	2008	The White Stripes	Indie/Alternative Band of the Year	Nominated	
NME Awards	2008	Icky Thump	Indie/Alternative Album of the Year	Nominated	
NME Awards	2008	"Icky Thump"	Indie/Alternative Track	Nominated	
Q Awards	2003	Elephant	Best Album	Nominated	
Rock and Roll Hall of Fame	2023	The White Stripes	Hall of Fame	Nominated	
Rock and Roll Hall of Fame	2025	The White Stripes	Hall of Fame	Won	
Teen Choice Awards	2003	The White Stripes	Choice Rock Group	Nominated	
Webby Awards	2024	"Black Math"	Best Use of AI	Nominated	

== Other accolades ==
=== Guinness World Records ===
Year the record was awarded, title of the record, and record holder
Year	Record	Record holder	Ref.
2009	Shortest music concert ever	The White Stripes	
