= You Don't Know What Love Is (You Just Do as You're Told) =

Single by the White Stripes

from the album Icky Thump
- B-side: "A Martyr for My Love for You"
- Released: September 18, 2007
- Recorded: January 14–15, 2007
- Studio: Blackbird Studio, Tennessee
- Genre: Garage rock
- Length: 3:54
- Label: Warner Bros.; XL
- Composers: Jack White III, Meg White
- Lyricist: Jack White III
- Producer: Jack White III

The White Stripes singles chronology
"Rag and Bone" (2007)	"You Don't Know What Love Is (You Just Do as You're Told)" (2007)	"Conquest" (2007)

Alternative cover
- Digital (US) and 7" single cover

"You Don't Know What Love Is (You Just Do as You're Told)" is a song by American rock duo the White Stripes, released by Warner Bros. and XL on September 18, 2007. The second track from their sixth studio album, Icky Thump (2007), the song was written and produced by Jack White, and was composed by the band.

== Recording ==
"You Don't Know What Love Is (You Just Do as You're Told)" is the second track from their sixth studio album Icky Thump. The basic tracking of the song was done on January 14, 2007, with overdubs done on the following day.

== Composition ==
Musically, "You Don't Know What Love Is (You Just Do as You're Told)" is a garage rock song about a man pleading for his friend to end her turbulent relationship.

== Release ==
"You Don't Know What Love Is (You Just Do as You're Told)" was first played live on June 29, 2007, in Calgary, Alberta, Canada. It was released as a CD single on September 18, 2007, with the 7-inch vinyl version following on September 25.

== Music video ==
The music video for "You Don't Know What Love Is (You Just Do as You're Told)" was directed by the Malloys. It features footage from the band's 2009 documentary Under Great White Northern Lights, and was filmed in front of the Hudson's Bay Company historical buildings in Iqaluit, Nunavut. It premiered on MTV and its parent networks on July 30, 2007.

== Commercial performance ==
"You Don't Know What Love Is (You Just Do as You're Told)" reached number 18 on the UK singles chart and number 63 on the Canadian Hot 100. It also peaked at number 9 on the US Alternative Songs chart, number 24 on the US Hot Singles Sales chart, and number 83 on the Australian Music Report Singles Chart.

== Track listing ==
CD single

1. "You Don't Know What Love Is (You Just Do as You're Told)"
2. "You Don't Know What Love Is (You Just Do as You're Told)" (Frat Rock Version)
3. "A Martyr for My Love for You" (Acoustic Version)

7-inch vinyl single

1. "You Don't Know What Love Is (You Just Do as You're Told)"
2. "A Martyr for My Love for You" (Acoustic Version)

== Personnel ==
Credits are adapted from the CD release.

The White Stripes

- Jack White III – vocals, guitar, production, mixing
- Meg White – drums

Additional personnel

- Joe Chiccarelli - mixing
- Philip J. Harvey - mixing
- Vlado Meller - mastering
- Kevin Metcalfe - mastering

== Covers ==
- Australian singer-songwriter Daniel Merriweather covered the song for the Japanese edition of his 2009 album Love & War.
