= Rag and Bone (song) =

Single by the White Stripes

from the album Icky Thump
- Released: June 6, 2007
- Recorded: January 24–31, 2007
- Studio: Blackbird (Berry Hill, Tennessee)
- Genre: Garage rock, blues rock, punk blues
- Length: 3:48
- Label: Warner Bros. (U.S.); XL Recordings (E.U.)
- Composers: Jack White III, Meg White
- Lyricist: Jack White III
- Producer: Jack White III

The White Stripes singles chronology
"Icky Thump" (2007)	"Rag and Bone" (2007)	"You Don't Know What Love Is (You Just Do as You're Told)" (2007)

"Rag and Bone" is a song by the American garage rock band the White Stripes. It is the ninth track on their 2007 album Icky Thump. The track was released as a free red 7" vinyl with the June 6, 2007, issue of the NME magazine, with a unique Jack White-designed etching on the flipside of each record.

The song is told from the point of view of two rag and bone collectors, portrayed by both Jack and Meg White. The song's conventional verses and choruses are interspersed with a spoken narrative. The single version of the song is a different mix from the version that was later released on the UK LP 'Icky Thump' album. Sean Fennessey of Vibe called the song "the funniest and best track" on Icky Thump.
