= Icky Thump =

2007 studio album by The White Stripes

Studio album by the White Stripes
- Released: June 15, 2007
- Recorded: January–February 2007
- Studio: Blackbird (Tennessee)
- Genres: Garage rock; alternative rock; punk blues; blues rock
- Length: 47:44
- Labels: Warner Bros.; Third Man
- Producer: Jack White III

The White Stripes chronology
Get Behind Me Satan (2005)	Icky Thump (2007)	Under Great White Northern Lights (2010)

Singles from Icky Thump
- 1. "Icky Thump" Released: April 26, 2007; 2. "Rag and Bone" Released: June 7, 2007; 3. "You Don't Know What Love Is (You Just Do As You're Told)" Released: September 18, 2007; 4. "Conquest" Released: December 18, 2007

Icky Thump is the sixth and final studio album by American rock duo the White Stripes. It was released in June 2007 in the United States by Warner Bros. and internationally by XL. Produced by vocalist and guitarist Jack White, it was recorded across three weeks at Blackbird from January to February 2007, the longest recording period of any White Stripes album. Icky Thump marks a return to the band's early garage rock and punk blues influences, featuring lyrics about "feeling positive about being alive".

Icky Thump was praised by critics, marking a resurgence after the polarizing reviews of their previous record. The album was a commercial success, topping the UK Albums Chart and peaking at number two on the Billboard 200, receiving gold certifications in both territories. It also entered the top ten of several other countries. Icky Thump won Best Alternative Music Album and Best Rock Performance by a Duo or Group with Vocal at the 50th Annual Grammy Awards.

== Recording and production ==
The thing I don't think engineers understand about me as a producer is that there are a lot of things I don't want to know anything about. I don't want to get underneath with a flashlight in my mouth and fix a Neve board. Not out of [lack of] interest—I'm extremely interested in that. But I make sure to keep myself away, because if I go down that route, you'll never see me again!

— Jack on producing at Blackbird Studio

Icky Thump was recorded and mixed entirely in analog at Nashville's Blackbird Studio in Studio D by engineer Joe Chiccarelli (Note: The White Stripes' manager, Ian Montone, introduced Jack to Chiccarelli after the latter produced The Shins' 2007 album Wincing the Night Away (The Shins were also managed by Ian Montone at the time). Jack then worked with Chiccarelli at Blackbird on a solo Hank Williams project coordinated by Bob Dylan, and later called upon him to engineer Icky Thump.) throughout January and early February 2007. After touring with The Raconteurs, Jack White was inspired to make another White Stripes album as he and Meg "gel effortlessly" and "that blessing" extended to the music. She temporarily relocated from Los Angeles, California to Jack's home in Nashville for a couple months to record the album. She was described as "on fire" and more involved in the whole process than previous albums. Meg described the album to be not "as elaborate as [Get Behind Me Satan]. [They] were ready to get back to a simple, basic form." According to Chiccarelli, in an interview with HitQuarters, The White Stripes had previously rehearsed and demoed around half the album, while the rest was conceived in the studio. The album was demoed because they were "pressed for time." In the manner of Get Behind Me Satan's second track "The Nurse", much of the album was constructed of "chopping things up" from one song with riffs and drum grooves improvised in the moment of recording and putting the leftover reel into another song. Pro Tools was not used for this process and there was no regard for how different things would sound (as Pro Tools can correct inconsistencies in tone or tempo). Chiccarelli said, "We spent a little more time than he is used to experimenting and trying different things on that album, whether it was different ways to record the drums or the vocals, or different arrangements, or cutting takes together."

In addition to his signature 1964 JB Hutto Montgomery Airline and 1950s Kay Hollowbody guitar, Jack would use his own 1969 Fender Telecaster and the studio's 1954 Telecaster model mainly for solos, or for use with an Electro-Harmonix POG (polyphonic octave generator) pedal. Gretsch guitars were used extensively. The rare 1957 White Penguin electric guitar was used on "Icky Thump", and appears in its music video. The acoustic Rancher Falcon model, emblazoned with Golden Age actress Rita Hayworth on its back, was used in the music video for "You Don't Know What Love Is (You Just Do as You're Told)" and in the Under Great White Northern Lights film. Jack also used a 1915 Gibson L-1, his personal favorite guitar. The assistant engineer, Lowell Reynolds, serendiptiously achieved the trademark Detroit rock distortion that Chiccarelli was seeking by incorrectly formatting the input and output into the stereo bus and they used that format for the rest of the album. Many Coles 4038 and AEA R84 microphones as well as Fender Twin Reverb amplifiers were overloaded in the process. Jack's guitars were so loud in the isolation booth it would often hurt Chiccarelli's, Reynolds's, and Meg's ears, forcing the former to wear protective earmuffs and the latter to not use monitor headphones at all as it made her uncomfortable. Instead, for her parts, the isolation booth's door was opened for the guitar's sound to spill to the drum's microphones. Much of the vocal production was spent modeling Jack's performance after Little Richard, which also overloaded the microphones and preamplifiers, yet Chiccarelli resolved this by looking at Jack's live performances in which he used a floor monitor and thought to tape an RCA 77-DX and Shure SM57 together and use a Fender Deluxe 85 amplifier to manipulate the distortion with Jack's movement. RCA 77-DX was the main vocal microphone used on the album, except for on the title track, which used a Telefunken U 47.

Jack did not have any finished songs for the album as of December 2006, starting with a blank chalkboard to put them on, but by January 2007, they started recording at Blackbird. The location was chosen in part for the opportunity to record in a larger studio with multiple engineers and their extensive microphone collection, both of which Jack likened to Abbey Road Studios. While Jack had an "incredible" experience there, he found it "very hard to work in that environment" for various reasons including his own nature. Working at Blackbird was "[Jack's] struggle" to get certain tones in an environment with the "cappuccino machine and nice carpet" that the band typically avoided, but he personally found Blackbird to be distracting and still preferred small studios like Toe Rag. Jack said, "Most of it needs to be a struggle in order for something interesting to happen," and in the past said a studio with modern appliances and furniture was "not a good environment to record rock & roll in." Jack and Meg did not succumb to the distractions available there, but Jack did notice it in working with the Raconteurs. Nevertheless, unlike Get Behind Me Satan (2005), if things broke, employees were there to fix them immediately and there was a "positive" atmosphere, especially in which Meg felt there was Southern hospitality. She noted that being in a modern studio was beneficial being that they often broke things during the recording.

The White Stripes had previously eschewed modern studios for a variety of reasons, primarily studio culture and Jack's preference for a simple production approach. After recording albums in Detroit, Memphis, and London, they came to the conclusion that locations did not have as significant of an effect on the music rather than the studio itself and room they are assigned to there. Within two days, the band had surpassed the ascetic budgets of their prior albums, in part due to Jack wanting to try things in a modern studio that he had not previously been able to (as he couldn't afford it). The duo spent 12 hours a day recording. Jack met audio engineer Vance Powell after frequently encountering each other in the hallway between their respective studios. They would go on to work on eight albums together, (Note: Consolers of the Lonely, Horehound, Sea of Cowards, Blunderbuss, Lazaretto, Dodge and Burn, Boarding House Reach, and Help Us Stranger.) one of which won them both (as well as Chiccarelli) a Grammy Award.

As a producer, Jack did not get involved in technical aspects of engineering with Chiccarelli, as they are "in different time zones" metaphorically, so as to not become too obsessed with it to the detriment of his performing and songwriting–otherwise he would consecrate himself to being an audio engineer or an amateur audio technician in his garage. Chiccarelli compared working with Jack to working with Frank Zappa, with whom he began his career. Meg elected to use two different drum sets and do her own drum editing on tape. A small drum set was in one of the room's seven recording spaces and a larger one was in the studio's main room, where Jack had space to play nearby. This is similar to how they recorded White Blood Cells (2001), which was also made in a large studio. They did not use a click track, so they had to depend on each other's timing. AKG D12, Neumann U 47 and U 67, Shure SM57, Coles 4038, and Sennheiser MD 441 microphones were used on the drum sets through a Fairchild 670 compressor. Chiccarelli initially took inspiration from classic rock engineer Glyn Johns, however Johns' 1970s method of keeping the Neumann U 67 microphone about a foot away from the amplifier made the drums, respectively, sound muffled and "boring"; Jack assumed this meant they should switch the drum set to his own 1964 Ludwig he had at home. Chiccarelli realized he should actually be taking inspiration from boom bap hip-hop production. But because Meg as a drummer did not strike her snare as strongly as her toms and bass, he used a Watkins Westminster guitar amplifier and a Shure 520DX microphone (aka "Green Bullet") to make the snare fill the room by intentionally spilling the sound to every microphone in the room, and a dbx boom box to boost the bass drum. As demonstrated in It Might Get Loud (2008), Jack later had the "Green Bullet" custom-installed into one of his Gretsch guitars.

The album was recorded on two 16-tracks as a "compromise" rather than the band's usual 8-track, and took three weeks—the longest of any White Stripes album in a studio. The duration was in large part due to not coming to the studio prepared with any songs and would have normally taken roughly 5 days. For unstated reasons, the rehearsal and recording were sidetracked which prolonged the process. Most songs were recorded on 15 tracks with one track relegated to a SMPTE timecode, except for "I'm Slowly Turning Into You" which required a second tape machine to record background vocals. Royer R-121, AEA R84, and Neumann U 67 microphones were used on guitar amps; the aforementioned RCA 77-DX and Shure SM57, as well as Altec 663, and Neumann U 47 were used on vocals. Jack later opined that for drums there is "[no] better-sounding microphone" than a Neumann U 47. The Shure SM7B microphone, used for guide vocals, was used as the main for "I'm Slowly Turning Into You". A photo of Charley Patton and a photo of Harpo Marx hung in the studio to keep Jack inspired and having a "guardian angel" between takes.

The vinyl version was mastered by Steve Hoffman. It contains alternate versions of both "Icky Thump" and "Rag and Bone". "Icky Thump" is a shorter, radio edit mix. It contains a short section where the main guitar riff is mixed to sound like it's being played through an AM radio. This mix also edits the penultimate chorus to be 14 seconds shorter before the guitar solo. "Rag and Bone" is also a different mix and contains different Jack vocals for each verse (possibly the original guide vocals and there are no vocals from Meg) and is missing the harmonies from the last chorus.

Three songs that had been "lingering around", namely "It's My Fault for Being Famous", "Honey, We Can't Afford to Look This Cheap", and "Cash Grab Compliations on the Matter", became a B-side to the album's last single "Conquest" and they were recorded and learned in Beck's living room (as at the time, Meg and Beck were neighbors and Beck had not yet finished his own studio). Beck produced all three tracks and is featured on the first two by way of vocals and slide guitar respectively. Working with Beck would end up being the last time The White Stripes ever recorded together, however during that period The White Stripes had no intention whatsoever of disbanding. "Honey, We Can't Afford to Look This Cheap" was also released on Jack's compilation album Acoustic Recordings 1998–2016.

== Music and lyrics ==
I suppose it reflects my own life, which is at a kind of turning point. I've moved to Nashville, [...] I've just made a new album. I'm making a lot of fresh starts in my life. And I think a lot of the characters in the songs are at these turning points, whether it's a midlife crisis, or they're at death's door, or they're just out of high school. I like the idea of people when they're forced to make a decision.

— Jack on Icky Thump's themes

Following the experimentation of Get Behind Me Satan, Icky Thump returns to the punk, garage rock and blues influences for which the band is known. Additionally, the album introduces Scottish folk music, avant-garde, trumpet, and bagpipes into the formula. Jack said that the album would appeal to fans of the band's self-titled debut and told Blender in July 2007 that Icky Thump "is about feeling positive about being alive, taking deep breaths and just being really happy." It reintroduces older characteristics such as the first studio recording of the early White Stripes song "Little Cream Soda". Entertainment Weekly's online site had an interview with Michel Gondry in which he said he would be directing a video for "I'm Slowly Turning Into You". He mentions the idea for the video. Gondry also says that the video idea came first, and after mentioning the idea to Jack, he wrote the song to fit that idea during the recording of Get Behind Me Satan. This video never came to fruition, which unfortunately was "a shame."

Regarding the title, a statement on the band's official website referencing the 1966 Batman film humorously claims that "Though some residents of northern England might almost recognize the title, the Stripes stress they are spelling it (Icky Thump) wrong intentionally just for 'kicks' and 'metaphors,' and to avoid a possible lawsuit from the estate of Billy Eckstine." On Later with Jools Holland (broadcast June 1, 2007), Jack clarified that the title is derived from "ecky thump", a Lancashire colloquial response of surprise. He heard its use as an exclamation by his then-wife, Karen Elson, who is from Oldham, historically in Lancashire. The album was not meant to have as much British influence as Elephant (2003). Jack joked the title was going to be Thermal Cracking Counter-Thrusts, and The White Stripes VI would have been an "ironic" title. "Icky thump" as an expression was also meant to encapsulate the amazement that they had been active for a decade by that point. The album is their "ginger-loving record." When asked to describe the album as a color, Jack said it's "soft black" because Meg's blue eyes appear that way; geometrically, they settled on the album representing a "circle."

The album artwork features Jack and Meg dressed as Pearlies, which is a traditional Cockney outfit somewhat contrary to the Northern dialect of the title. In the liner notes of Icky Thump, "Electra" is thanked on the second line, just after God. According to Ben Blackwell, Jack's nephew, this is not directed towards the radio DJ, Electra, but to a pet Jack and drummer Meg White used to have. The liner notes also thank drummers Gene Krupa, Mitch Mitchell (Jack's personal favorite drummer), Buddy Rich, John Bonham, Louie Bellson, and, on the same line Karen Elson (as well as their daughter, Scarlett), among many others. Those drummers were thanked because, in Jack's view, "There are not enough drummers capturing people's imaginations these days," and in his younger years he "was in love with Gene Krupa". The album is dedicated to Jack's father.

=== Songs 1–7 ===
"Icky Thump", the only eponymous title track in the White Stripes' discography, was the album's first single. The lyrics address the hypocrisy of white Americans' attitude toward Mexican immigration to the United States, yet evidently having no issue with using Mexican labor for any reason. The United States was invading foreign countries for war in the Middle East–yet expressing building a wall to keep immigrants out. The phrase was popularized in an episode of the British comedy series The Goodies, though Jack had never seen the show. The song resurfaced in popularity when the "build the wall" rhetoric was part of Donald Trump's first presidential campaign. The White Stripes created "Icky Trump" t-shirts in protest. The song won a Grammy Award for Best Rock Performance.

"You Don't Know What Love Is (You Just Do as You're Told)" was not conceived to be a country song, however some aspect of the genre materialized on its own. It was chosen as the album's third single and its music video was filmed in remote Iqaluit, Nunavut, Canada. The song was written while Jack was on tour with The Raconteurs supporting Bob Dylan. Dylan seemed wry when Jack told him about the song then asked, "But what key is it in, man?"

"300 M.P.H. Torrential Outpour Blues" was Jack's venture to combine as many elements of blues into one song without being gimmicky, "to break it up by having these bursts of extreme, explosive blues piercing through this country blues at times." She had learned tape editing from engineer Liam Watson at Toe Rag Studios during the recording of Elephant. The lyric "It's safe to say that someone out there's got a problem with almost anything you'll do" may have been a response to the Detroit garage rock community and "fickle" hipsters who would not support the band after they achieved mainstream success and platinum-certified records. The Washington Post considered it "an unexpected moment of brilliance" on the album.

"Conquest" was released as the fourth and final single–and became their final single as a band. Despite the sound of a trumpet section, Nashville-based mariachi trumpeter Regulo Aldama played his part multiple times, and Jack overdubbed the recordings. The vinyl included three bonus tracks featuring Beck.

"Prickly Thorn, But Sweetly Worn" and "St. Andrew (This Battle Is in the Air)", the latter performed by Meg on vocals, were written on a Gibson F-4 mandolin. Bagpipes, performed by Jim Drury, were added to the song to emphasize the Scottish essence rather than American folk or Irish folk music as well as in honor of Jack's and Meg's respective Scottish ancestry. In addition to their ancestry, Jack believed some of their best concerts were done in Scotland. Jack felt that bagpipes are a "very somber, very beautiful instrument in the right context", but doesn't know how to play them. He had the idea to add bagpipes because the pump organ used on the song sounded similar. The bagpipes were in the key of D. "Prickly Thorn, But Sweetly Worn" was inspired by a thistle, the national flower of Scotland. Meg called the song "sweet but accusatory." Meg did two different bass drum tracks on "Prickly Thorn, But Sweetly Worn" using a mallet and a Ludwig marching bass drum (as demonstrated in the Under Nova Scotian Lights segment of Under Great White Northern Lights); the tracks switch between sections of the song, crescendoing toward the middle. Meg also did two drum tracks on "St. Andrew (This Battle Is in the Air)" while Jack slowed down and sped up the tape making Meg's drum tracks like a "heartbeat." The song was not meant to intentionally sound "Zeppelin-esque". "St. Andrew (This Battle Is in the Air)" is "like a prayer" (Note: Jack concurred with the interviewer who described it that way.) and "a battle of our souls." The song is about the death of Jack's father, who died on Saint Andrew's Day. The song has a religious tone; while neither of them purport to be religious people, Meg and Jack had disparate views on faith when the subject came up. Meg performed the vocals by reciting random lines that Jack pointed to in the moment. Both songs include thigh slapping and hand percussion.

"Bone Broke" was originally written in 1998 for a Detroit band called Rocket 455, however they ultimately never recorded the song, so it was resuscitated for Icky Thump. The song was recorded as a live take. Vice considers it the best song on the album.

=== Songs 8–13 ===
"Little Cream Soda" originated as an impromptu, untitled jam from a 2003 concert that took place at Chicago's Aragon Ballroom. The original appears on the deluxe edition of Elephant. As a complete song, it was added to Icky Thump out of the superstitition of every White Stripes album having a song with "little" in its title, though the pattern was an otherwise random coincidence up until that point. Jack's guitar amps were in an isolation booth adjacent to Meg's drum set and the sound intentionally bled (or spilled) into the drum's microphones so that no headphones were used. Meg described it as a blues song, intrinsically, whereas Jack described it as speed metal.

"Rag and Bone", the album's second single, was inspired by a story Jack's then-wife Karen Elson told him about her comical, childhood fantasy of absconding with rag and bone men. Jack created a riff and started using the phrase for it. It's about "collecting people's junk, using people's problems, magnifying and amplifying them in a song."

"I'm Slowly Turning Into You" was originally formulated during the production of the previous album, Get Behind Me Satan, using a Hammond organ located in Jack's living room. Jack was trying to give a "positive slant" to the song but "just wasn't seeing the bright side very much at all during Satan."

"A Martyr for My Love for You" is a ballad depicting "the idea of the guy with no confidence, like me," Jack said. The lyrics depict a 16-year-old girl with whom the narrator is in love. However the song was not written from the perspective of "a creepy older guy," despite what the lyrics may insinuate. Jack explained that the narrator could have been a lovestruck teenager, but he never determined the narrator's age. The theme of the song is about how "nice guys are finishing last" whereas "cocky, horrible people" have no issue getting a date to go home with.

"Catch Hell Blues" was recorded live in one take. It was engineered in the same manner as "Little Cream Soda". Jack described it as a song that was not particularly written for the White Stripes but would not have fit with The Raconteurs at all, though in his opinion it represents the core foundation of the White Stripes, as with "Bone Broke".

"Effect and Cause", like the album's second track has influences of country music that came about in the songwriting process. The song is about an unknown woman Jack had been in love with a few years prior. "It's about where guilt begins and ends," Jack said.

== Promotion and release ==
The USB drive album artwork for Icky Thump, stylized illustrations of Jack (left), and Meg (right). The hats are the covers to the drives.

The White Stripes announced the completion of Icky Thump on February 28, 2007. On May 30, 2007, Chicago radio station Q101 aired the entire album without the band's permission. Jack called into the station (not on air) and reacted angrily about them playing it before its release, however the DJ said she was just trying to share the "unbelievably brilliant and awesome" album with fellow fans and had no malicious intent.

To promote Icky Thump before its release, the band distributed custom-designed boxes and previewed tracks from the record through Ice Cream Man. The ice cream promotion focused on the Coachella, Sasquatch, and Bonnaroo festivals and culminated in the band's release show on June 20, 2007, at the site of the former West Hollywood Tower Records on Sunset Blvd., temporarily rechristened Icky Thump. Records. Meg said it as "an honor to play there."

In addition to being released on CD and 180 gram vinyl, the band released the album on a limited edition 512 MB USB drive which was designed by British artist Stanley Chow There are two versions; one of which depicts Jack, the other depicting Meg. The manufacturing was limited to 3,333 of each, and were shipped the week of the U.S. release. Each drive contained the album in Apple lossless format.

A special mono mix of Icky Thump was available on 180 gram vinyl for a short time to Third Man Vault Premium Account subscribers.

The Conquest single included trading cards depicting Jack as matador "El Sloth" (named Juan Luis Martinez Blanco III of Serpa); Meg as "El Bianca Rosa"; and Beck as "El Perdedor" with the full name of Spanish artist Salvador Dalí added to his.

The White Stripes gave free singles of "Rag and Bone" to NME readers in accordance with British chart rules. Meg wanted the vinyl to be white, whereas Jack wanted it to be red, so one of each was given as a compromise. The cover art was a horse as Meg likes the animal.

== Icky Thump Tour ==
The tour commenced on May 18, 2007, at the Cannery Ballroom in Nashville, Tennessee and soon went to Barcelona, Spain; Nürburg and Nuremberg, Germany for festival performances Primavera Sound and Rock am Ring and Rock im Park respectively. After a concerts in Vienna, Austria; Rome, and Segrate near Milan, Italy, the band performed at a festival in Oeiras, Portugal. Next, they performed a full concert on French television station Canal+ in Paris, France and at the Le Zénith arena. Meg "loves" France and Jack would have liked to return to Nice and Bordeaux, however the atmosphere of Paris reminded him of Detroit. They then went to the United Kingdom for several performances and festivals before returning to the United States to perform at Bonnaroo in Manchester, Tennessee and appear on Late Night with Conan O'Brien. After performing at Irving Plaza in New York City and at Tower Records in Los Angeles, California, the band sought to tour every province and territory of Canada. That segment of the tour began in Burnaby, British Columbia, then went to Whitehorse, Yukon; Yellowknife, Northwestern Territories; and Iqaluit, Nunavut (where the music video for "You Don't Know What Love Is (You Just Do What You're Told)" was filmed). Next, they went to Calgary, and Edmonton, Alberta; Saskatoon, Saskatchewan; Winnipeg, Manitoba; Thunder Bay, and Toronto, Ontario; and Montreal, Quebec. Then London, Ontario, and Ottawa, Ontario, respectively, the latter of which for a blues festival; Moncton, New Brunswick; Charlottetown, Prince Edward Island; Halifax, and Glace Bay, Nova Scotia; and St. John's, Newfoundland and Labrador where they notably played "one note" to commemorate performing in all provinces and territories. The veracity of whether it constitutes the record for shortest concert performance was disputed by Guinness World Records, to Jack's chagrin.

The Canadian tour became a documentary called Under Great White Northern Lights (2009) which included interviews, behind the scenes, and the additional, stochastic performances they did in between shows; it was their manager's idea to do a film because of the unconventional locations. The tour again returned to the United States starting in Portland, Maine; then to Boston, Massachusetts; New York City to perform at Madison Square Garden; Wallingford, Connecticut; Wilmington, Delaware; Fairfax, Virginia; North Myrtle Beach, South Carolina; Birmingham, Alabama; and abruptly ended on July 31st in Southaven, Mississippi, when Meg decided it would be their last concert ever, later to be revealed as a result of anxiety disorder. This occurred before there was a month-long sabbatical between the next scheduled concert in Albuquerque, New Mexico, as Jack's son was due to be born the next week in early August. After Albuquerque on September 13th, the tour would have continued with a festival performance at Austin City Limits Music Festival in Austin, Texas then to San Diego, Inglewood, and Berkeley, California. Afterwards, the band would have gone to Anchorage, Alaska; Seattle, Washington; Boise, Idaho; Salt Lake City, Utah; Jackson Hole, Wyoming; Rapid City, South Dakota; Fargo, North Dakota; Lincoln, Nebraska; Chicago, Illinois; and ending on October 10th in Honolulu, Hawaii. The goal was to reach certain states they had never been to during previous tours to be able to say that they had performed in all 50 states. (Note: In 2015, Jack accomplished that as a solo artist.) A brief arena tour in the United Kingdom was scheduled next, however that was canceled as well. That segment of the tour would have gone to Glasgow, Scotland; Manchester, Newcastle upon Tyne, and Birmingham, England; Cardiff, Wales; and returning to England in Sheffield, Nottingham, and London.

Jack acknowledged that they were fine with not touring anymore, as The Beatles had done so in the mid 1960s. The previous year without touring together, their intense performance level, and Jack's family priorities that left him with less time to rehearse may have significantly influenced Meg's reasoning. The band still intended to be active and made a few more songs with Beck later that year. Ultimately, Jack said he still does not know why Meg decided to stop performing, but that she was willing to bow out on the success of Icky Thump and had no regrets about their music despite being a "very reluctant" performer. The subsequent years had been open-ended with many conversations between them and the label, and there had been discussions and considerations on making another album until late 2010. Some unknown songs that would have appeared on a potential seventh album in 2010, were recorded in 2009.

== Critical reception ==
Professional ratings
Aggregate scores
Source	Rating
Metacritic	80/100
Review scores
Source	Rating
AllMusic	4/5 stars
The A.V. Club	A−
Entertainment Weekly	A
The Guardian	4/5 stars
NME	9/10
Pitchfork	8.0/10
Rolling Stone	3.5/5 stars
Spin	3/5 stars
Uncut	4/5 stars

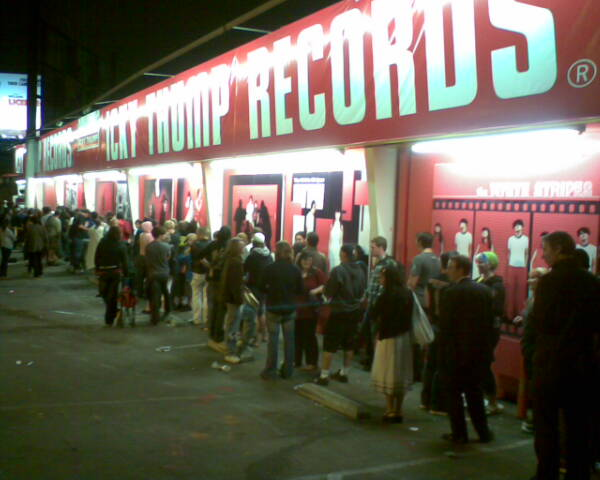
Fans standing outside of a rebranded Tower Records in 2007

Icky Thump received critical acclaim, with an overall average rating of 80 out of 100 at Metacritic. Barry Nicolson with British magazine NME wrote, "Icky Thump is brilliant, there's no way around that." Commenting on the album's "fuller sound and relaxed flights of fancy," Heather Phares of AllMusic said "Icky Thump is a mature, but far from stodgy" album, and that "it's just great fun to hear the band play." Jody Rosen, writing for Blender, called the album "the sound of a band not stretching out so much as digging in: burrowing deeper into loamy soil they know well." Ultimately giving the album 3.5 out of 5 stars and giving an (A−) on his website, Robert Christgau, with Rolling Stone, summed up the return album this way "Although the new constructions don't entice as consistently as they should, their noise stays with you. And what that noise stands for is itself." He added, "Like his sometime heroes Led Zeppelin, Jack White builds monuments. They're suitable for awestruck visits. But they're no place to settle down."

In one of the more negative reviews, Josh Tyrangiel of Time remarked, "The White Stripes are too weird and talented to be boring, but it sounds like they might be a little bored."

On December 6, 2007, Icky Thump was nominated for four 2007 Grammy Awards: Best Alternative Album, Best Boxed or Special Limited Edition Package, Best Rock Song, and Best Rock Performance by a Duo or Group with Vocal for the single "Icky Thump", winning Best Alternative Album and Best Rock Performance by a Duo or Group With Vocal. Q named Icky Thump as the 2nd best album of 2007. Furthermore, the album placed No. 17 on Rolling Stone's list of the Top 50 Albums of 2007.

== Track listing ==
All lyrics are written by Jack White, except where noted; all music is composed by Jack White and Meg White, except where noted.

Icky Thump track listing
No.	Title	Writer(s)	Length
1.	"Icky Thump"		4:17
2.	"You Don't Know What Love Is (You Just Do as You're Told)"		3:54
3.	"300 M.P.H. Torrential Outpour Blues"		5:28
4.	"Conquest"	Corky Robbins	2:48
5.	"Bone Broke"		3:14
6.	"Prickly Thorn, but Sweetly Worn"		3:05
7.	"St. Andrew (This Battle Is in the Air)"		1:49
8.	"Little Cream Soda"		3:45
9.	"Rag and Bone"		3:48
10.	"I'm Slowly Turning into You"		4:34
11.	"A Martyr for My Love for You"		4:19
12.	"Catch Hell Blues"		4:18
13.	"Effect and Cause"		3:00
Total length:			47:44

=== Notes ===
- The Japanese edition features a bonus track, "Baby Brother".
- The iTunes release features the bonus tracks "Baby Brother" and a live rendition of "Tennessee Border" (Jimmy Work).

== Personnel ==
Credits are adapted from the album's liner notes.

The White Stripes

- Jack White – guitar, vocals, mandolin, keyboards, synthesizers, production, mixing
- Meg White – drums, vocals, synthesizers

Additional personnel

- Regulo Aldama – trumpet (track 4)
- Jim Drury – Scottish smallpipes (tracks 6 and 7)
- Steve Hoffman – vinyl mastering
- Vlado Meller – digital mastering
- Joe Chiccarelli – engineering, mixing
- Lowell Reynolds – assistant engineering

Artwork

- "The Third Man" – layout and design
- Rob Jones – layout and design
- Autumn de Wilde – photography

== Charts ==
=== Weekly charts ===
Weekly chart performance for Icky Thump
Chart (2007)	Peak position
Australian Albums (ARIA)	3
Austrian Albums (Ö3 Austria)	5
Belgian Albums (Ultratop Flanders)	2
Belgian Albums (Ultratop Wallonia)	18
Canadian Albums (Billboard)	2
Danish Albums (Hitlisten)	8
Dutch Albums (Album Top 100)	8
Finnish Albums (Suomen virallinen lista)	5
French Albums (SNEP)	9
German Albums (Offizielle Top 100)	4
Irish Albums (IRMA)	5
Italian Albums (FIMI)	9
Mexican Albums (Top 100 Mexico)	77
New Zealand Albums (RMNZ)	2
Norwegian Albums (VG-lista)	4
Scottish Albums (Official Charts)	1
Spanish Albums (Promusicae)	19
Swedish Albums (Sverigetopplistan)	9
Swiss Albums (Schweizer Hitparade)	5
UK Albums (Official Charts)	1
US Billboard 200	2
US Top Rock Albums (Billboard)	2

=== Year-end charts ===
Year-end chart performance for Icky Thump
Chart (2007)	Position
Australian Albums (ARIA)	84
Belgian Albums (Ultratop Flanders)	41
French Albums (SNEP)	141
UK Albums (OCC)	90
US Billboard 200	76
US Top Rock Albums (Billboard)	14

== Certifications ==
Certifications for Icky Thump
Region	Certification	Certified units/sales
Australia (ARIA)	Gold	35,000^{^}
Canada (Music Canada)	Platinum	100,000^{^}
New Zealand (RMNZ)	Gold	7,500^{^}
United Kingdom (BPI)	Gold	100,000^{^}
United States (RIAA)	Gold	801,000
^{^} Shipments figures based on certification alone.

== Sources ==
- Dolon, John (July 2007), "The White Stripes: New Jack City" Blender Volume unknown: pp. 109–112
