= 300 M.P.H. Torrential Outpour Blues =

Song by the White Stripes

from the album Icky Thump
- Released: June 15, 2007
- Recorded: January 18–23, 2007
- Studio: Blackbird (Berry Hill, Tennessee)
- Genre: Blues rock, garage rock, punk blues
- Length: 5:29
- Label: Warner Bros.
- Composers: Jack White III, Meg White
- Lyricist: Jack White III
- Producer: Jack White III

"300 M.P.H. Torrential Outpour Blues" is a song written by Jack White and recorded by the White Stripes. It is the third track from the album Icky Thump (2007), as well as one of the band's longest songs, at nearly five and a half minutes long.

The Washington Post called the song "a love song that opens as a quiet shuffle, then gently toggles the soft-loud-dynamics switch before a pealing 12-second guitar break erupts violently and without warning just past the two-minute mark before fading out -- an unexpected moment of brilliance".

Jack White, the guitarist of the White Stripes, explained that when writing this song he wanted to use as many different styles of blues as he could in one song and that "it goes from the really screeching, distorted, heavy blues song, to a wimpy Wurlitzer kind of loungey blues sound, to a white-boy takes on the blues, to real earthy, country blues."
