= Stanley Chow =

British illustrator

- Born: 1974 (age 51–52); Manchester, England
- Known for: Art, illustration
- Website: Stanley Chow Illustration

Stanley Chow is an artist and illustrator from Manchester, England.

== Early life and education ==
Chow was born in 1974 and raised in Manchester by parents who had migrated to England from Hong Kong. He grew up in a fish and chip shop and says that living in this environment helped him to become an artist. Speaking to the BBC in 2014, Chow said, "The reason why I am an illustrator is because growing up, the only form of amusement I had was with a biro and chip paper. I didn't really have many toys when I was a nipper, all I did was draw and draw and draw."

He was educated at King's School in Macclesfield and during his time there he was inspired by his sixth form art teacher, Robin Hidden, who was himself an illustrator. Chow went on to study at Swindon College of Art on a course which included an exchange placement in Lyon, France.

Back in Manchester, Chow worked for a time as a club DJ, regularly playing at venues including The Roadhouse and The Night and Day Cafe. While out drinking, he would spend time entertaining himself by sketching his friends, who included Elbow's Guy Garvey, using simple line strokes which eventually became the defining style of his work.

== Career ==
Early work included creating fashion illustrations for the teen magazines Just Seventeen and Sugar, but when his father bought him a computer it changed the way he worked as Chow found himself being able to send work to clients digitally. He moved away from drawing and painting and started creating vector-based work using Adobe Illustrator, becoming a full-time illustrator in 2006. In 2007, his career took off when his art was seen by the musicians Meg and Jack White from the band The White Stripes. Chow had made a mock poster for the band and they liked it. Months later, he was commissioned to create artwork for their Icky Thump album and he designed a limited edition USB flash drive which was later nominated for a Grammy Award in the Best Boxed or Special Limited Edition Package category.

=== Portraits ===
Much of Chow's work is portraiture, specialising in images of celebrities from the worlds of music, television, film and sport. The people he selects to illustrate are spontaneous choices although his love of football can be seen in the number of portraits he has made of footballers. His work is influenced by the Panini football stickers which he collected as a child in the 1980s. As a lifelong Manchester United fan, Chow also agreed to illustrate poet Tony "Longfella" Walsh's poem The Govan Boy which was written in tribute to the Manchester United football manager Alex Ferguson. They both met Ferguson and discussed the project on BBC Radio Manchester.

=== Andy Burnham collaborations ===
In 2020, during the Covid pandemic, Chow wanted to show his appreciation for Andy Burnham's work as the Mayor of Greater Manchester in helping those who were in financial need, and so published a portrait he'd made of Burnham on social media. Following a public demand for copies, Chow created prints and mugs which were sold with profits going to the Manchester Mayor's Charity.

A revised version of the portrait was used by Burnham during his 2026 by-election campaign which saw him return to Westminster by becoming the MP of Makerfield. Chow initially didn’t charge Burnham for the artwork, as he felt the recognition was enough, but he confirmed in a Guardian interview that Burnham’s team did formally license the image.

When Burnham went onto become Prime Minister in July 2026, Chow made a new portrait showing him wearing a suit and tie, stood outside 10 Downing Street. The picture was published as a full-page colour image on the front page of the Manchester Evening News, to mark Burnham’s first day as Prime Minister.

=== Copyright infringements of Burnham image ===
When Chow's by-election image of Andy Burnham was used within campaign literature produced by the Reform UK party in June 2026, the advertisements were withdrawn by Reform following a legal threat by Chow over copyright infringement.

In October that same year, Chow found himself seeking legal advice once again, when his image of Burnham was copied and reproduced on bottles of water and tubs of sweets, alongside slogans mocking the prime minister, which were given away at the Conservative Party Conference. Chow had not given permission and spoke about the importance of taking a stand to protect artists' work from copyright infringement, "especially in this day and age where artists are struggling, because of AI and the cost of living."

== Commissioned work ==
Chow produces work for a wide range of clients including local businesses and internationally recognised brands. Throughout Manchester his work can be seen at Metrolink tram stops promoting Transport for Greater Manchester's "Get Me There" travel card scheme. In 2014 and 2015, Chow's illustrations were commissioned by the Modern Designers agency to promote Chinese New Year celebrations in the city.

Internationally, Chow's clients include Saatchi & Saatchi, McDonald's, WWE and Wired magazine. He also regularly supplies illustrations to The New Yorker magazine and, as well as producing images for articles, has created portraits of a number of the magazine's featured contributing staff.

In 2014, he illustrated a set of characters for the advertising agency Leo Burnett UK's long term "Little Piccadilly" interactive campaign for McDonald's. The campaign enabled people to create their own animated characters using their smart phones, which could then be sent live to the McDonald's screen in Piccadilly Circus, London.

In the same year, he was also invited to the Lego headquarters in Billund, Denmark, where he provided lectures and workshops to graphic designers. He has continued to work with Lego and at the start of 2015 was presented with a Lego miniature figure of himself which he had designed.

In 2015, Chow designed one of his most high-profile commissions to date. On 4 October, The New York Times Magazine cover had a photograph of a metallic helium balloon depicting the face of presidential hopeful Donald Trump. The balloon was designed by Chow and then photographed floating away on a white background by Jamie Chung. The project was turned around in the space of a week with Chow being commissioned on the same day that the idea was thought up. Rather than making an illustration of a balloon which could be photoshopped, the design director, Gail Bichler, and her team decided to manufacture an actual balloon which could be inflated, so 25 were produced in order for them to be photographed in different ways. The cover was well received with, gaining 71% of votes in the Adweek weekly magazine "Cover Battle" although in an interview with GQ Magazine Trump referred to the cover as "ridiculous". In the following year, the cover won a gold medal from The Society for News Design in its annual awards, in the 12C Magazines, Cover Design category, with judges describing the illustration as "Playful, fun, timely, tells a story, also timeless".

== Exhibitions ==
In June 2014, Chow launched his first UK solo retrospective which was held at the Centre for Chinese Contemporary Art in the Northern Quarter of Manchester. He reflected on his upbringing in a chip shop by turning the window of the arts centre into a takeaway shop front. At the end of the exhibition all of the works were sold on a first-come, first-served basis at takeaway prices with buyers being able to remove the art from the walls and take it home immediately. All proceeds went to the CFCCA artistic programme.

In early 2016, Chow announced plans to return to the Centre for Chinese Contemporary Art for a follow up exhibition which would take place for six months from February as part of the centre's 30th anniversary celebrations. The new exhibition, entitled InStangram, would follow on from Chow's previous Takeaway exhibition by presenting 30 new designs featuring food, locations and objects inspired by Chow's experiences of growing up as an English-born Chinese man in Manchester.

On 3 August 2026, the Manchester Arndale shopping centre launched MCR Made; a 3D exhibition of giant inflatable figures. Based on Stanley Chow’s instantly recognisable designs, the suspended figures showed famous Mancunians and those who had shaped the city. The eclectic mix included comedian Caroline Aherne, footballer Marcus Rashford, scientist Alan Turing, and poet Lemn Sissay. As part of the exhibition Chow made a new portrait of MP Ellen Wilkinson, a suffragette and women’s rights campaigner born in Manchester, who was the first female Education Secretary in the British Cabinet. The artwork links to the Arndale Centre’s ‘Ask for Ellen’ initiative which began in 2022, aiming to combat period poverty by offering free sanitary products for those in need.
