= Ice Cream Man =

Ice Cream Man may refer to:

- A vendor employed on an ice cream van

== Music ==
- Ice Cream Man (album), a 1996 album by Master P
  - "Mr. Ice Cream Man", the title track
- "Ice Cream Man", a song by Tom Waits from his 1973 album Closing Time
- "Ice Cream Man", a song by Jonathan Richman and the Modern Lovers from their 1977 album Rock 'n' Roll with the Modern Lovers
- "Ice Cream Man", a song by John Brim and later covered by Van Halen on their 1978 debut album
- "Ice Cream Man", a song by Dru Down from his 1994 album Explicit Game
- "Ice Cream Man", a song by Tyga from his 2015 mixtape Fuk Wat They Talkin Bout
- "Ice Cream Man", a song by Blur from their 2015 album The Magic Whip
- "Ice Cream Man", a song by Yungblud from his 2020 album Weird!
- "Ice Cream Man", a 2018 song by Sam and the Womp
- "Ice Cream Man", a 2023 single by Raye from her album My 21st Century Blues

== Film ==
- Ice Cream Man (1995 film), an American horror film about an ice cream man
- Ice Cream Man, a recurring gag character in Disney's Lilo & Stitch franchise
- The Ice Cream Man (2024 film), a short drama film
- Ice Cream Man (2026 film), a horror film directed by Eli Roth

== Other uses ==
- Ice Cream Man (business), an American business that gives away ice cream at music events
- Ice Cream Man (comics), a comic book series written by W. Maxwell Prince
