= Conquest (song) =

1952 single by Corky Robbins and Johnny Bosworth

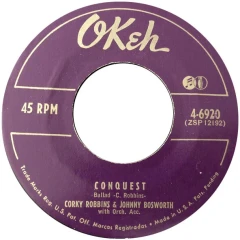

Single by Corky Robbins and Johnny Bosworth
- B-side: "Release Me"
- Released: October 1952
- Recorded: June 1952
- Genre: Traditional pop
- Length: 3:00
- Label: Okeh
- Songwriter: Corky Robbins

Corky Robbins and Johnny Bosworth singles chronology
"Conquest" (1952)	"I Won't Believe It" (1953)

"Conquest"
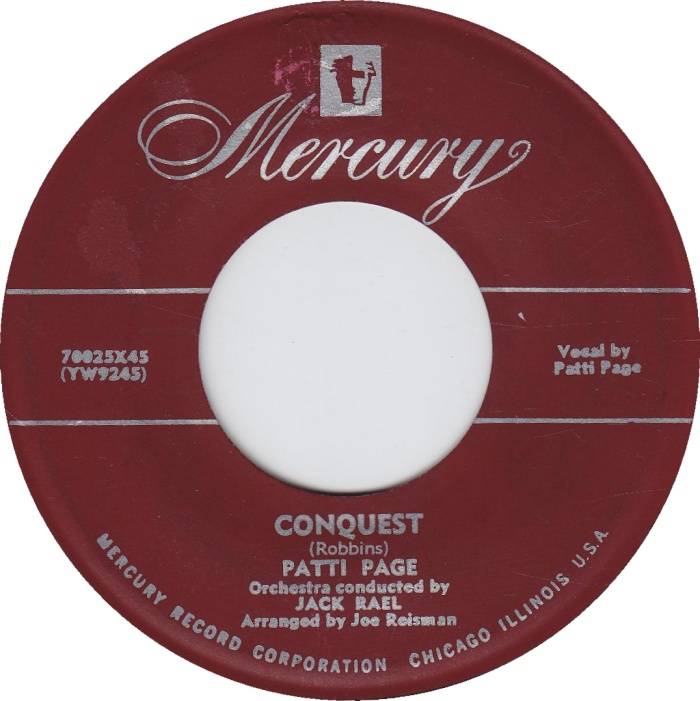

Single by Patti Page with Jack Rael and his Orchestra
- B-side: "Why Don't You Believe Me?"
- Released: November 2, 1952
- Recorded: August 6, 1952
- Genre: Pop
- Length: 2:27
- Label: Mercury 70025
- Songwriter: Corky Robbins

"Conquest" is a song written and first recorded by Corky Robbins and popularized in the 1950s by Patti Page. "Conquest" was also covered by the White Stripes on their 2007 album Icky Thump, which features Regulo Aldama on trumpet. Patti Page's version of "Conquest" was featured on an eBay commercial in the autumn of 2007. The song was used in multiple commercials in 2013 including the Ram trucks "Got Away" advert and also the Machete Kills trailer.

== The White Stripes version ==
"Conquest"

Single by The White Stripes

from the album Icky Thump
- Released: December 18, 2007
- Recorded: January–February 2007
- Studio: Blackbird (Berry Hill, Tennessee)
- Genre: Garage rock
- Length: 2:48
- Label: Warner Bros. (US); XL Recordings (EU)
- Songwriter: Corky Robbins
- Producer: Jack White

The White Stripes singles chronology
"You Don't Know What Love Is (You Just Do as You're Told)" (2007)	"Conquest" (2007)

"Conquest" was released as the fourth and final single from American alternative rock band the White Stripes' album Icky Thump in December 2007, and serves as their final single. It was released as a series of 7-inch colored vinyl singles, each containing the track "Conquest". The tracks "It's My Fault for Being Famous", "Honey, We Can't Afford to Look This Cheap" and "Cash Grab Complications on the Matter" appear on the black, white and red version of the records, respectively, with the latter featuring an acoustic Mariachi version of "Conquest". The various B-sides were co-produced by musician Beck, who also contributed vocals and piano to "Being Famous" and slide guitar to "Honey". Despite the sound of a trumpet section, Nashville-based mariachi trumpeter Regulo Aldama played his part multiple times, and Jack overdubbed the recordings.

Each single includes a trading card featuring famous matadors El Sloth, El Bianca Rosa or El Perdador.

The vinyl singles were released in the US on December 18 and in the UK on December 31. The single peaked at No. 30 in the UK Singles Chart; although this made it The White Stripes' lowest charting single to date, it charted reasonably high considering it wasn't released as a CD single.

A large portion of the "Conquest" vinyl singles were mislabeled. The red and white sticker/seal on some of the sleeves actually reads "You Don't Know What Love Is (You Just Do As You're Told)", the seal of which belongs to their previous single of that name. Also, the B-side of the red vinyl, which features the song "Cash Grab Complications on the Matter" reads "Honey, We Can't Afford to Look This Cheap" on the record, which is the title of a separate B-side on the white vinyl. The black vinyl featuring "It's My Fault for Being Famous" is mislabeled as well, with "Cash Grab Complications on the Matter" being listed as the B-side. The Best Buy exclusive CD version features the matador being charged at by a bull. The CD version has all the track numbers the color white except for the third track "Cash Grab Complications on the Matter", relating to Jack White's love for the number 3.

Jack White first liked the song when he would listen to Page's hits album while working in his upholstery shop. He had wanted to cover the song for ten years when he finally did in 2007.

The band also released a Spanish version of the song, re-titled "Conquista", was released on CD, 7-inch vinyl and download on various dates through January 2008.

The trumpeting intro was featured in the 2014 comedy movie The Interview.

=== Music video ===
The music video for "Conquest" features a bullfighting theme, directed by Diane Martel in Artesia, California. It premiered November 26 on MTV and November 27 in the iTunes Store as well as Fuse TV.

The music video received two nominations for Best Art Direction and Best Cinematography at the 2008 MTV Video Music Awards, winning the latter one.

=== Personnel ===
- Jack White – vocals, guitar
- Meg White – drums
- Regulo Aldama – trumpet

=== Track listing ===
==== 7" one (black vinyl) ====
- A: "Conquest" – 2:48
- B: "It's My Fault for Being Famous" – 2:56

==== 7" two (white vinyl) ====
- A: "Conquest" – 2:48
- B: "Honey, We Can't Afford to Look This Cheap" – 3:54

==== 7" three (red vinyl) ====
- A: "Conquest" (acoustic Mariachi version) – 2:55
- B: "Cash Grab Complications on the Matter" – 3:37

==== Spanish 7" ====
- A: "Conquista" (Spanish version)
- B: "Conquest (acoustic Mariachi version)

==== Digital maxi-single (US only) ====
1. "Conquest" – 2:48
2. "It's My Fault for Being Famous" – 2:56
3. "Cash Grab Complications on the Matter" – 3:37
4. "Honey, We Can't Afford to Look This Cheap" – 3:54
5. "Conquest" (acoustic Mariachi version) – 2:55

==== CD maxi-single (Best Buy exclusive) ====
1. "Conquest" – 2:50
2. "It's My Fault for Being Famous" – 2:56
3. "Cash Grab Complications on the Matter" – 3:40
4. "Honey, We Can't Afford to Look This Cheap" – 3:59
5. "Conquest" (acoustic Mariachi version) – 2:45

==== AU iTunes single ====
1. "Conquest" – 2:51
2. "Conquest" (acoustic Mariachi version) – 2:47
