= Under Great White Northern Lights =

2009 rockumentary directed by the Malloys

- Film poster
- Directed by: Emmett Malloy
- Produced by: Ian Montone; Mike Sarkissian
- Cinematography: Giles Dunning
- Edited by: Tim Wheeler
- Production companies: Three Foot Giant; Woodshed Films Inc.
- Release dates: September 18, 2009 (Toronto); March 16, 2010 (Canada)
- Running time: 92 minutes
- Country: Canada
- Language: English

Under Great White Northern Lights is the 2009 documentary film about the White Stripes' summer 2007 tour across Canada, directed by Emmett Malloy of the Malloys, and the first live album by the band. It was released on DVD and Blu-ray. The CD, LP, DVD, BD, and box set were all released on March 16, 2010, in Canada, with other dates worldwide.

== Film ==
=== Development ===
We weren't just taking a snapshot in front of a statue. We could be part of something that was happening in each town – playing in town squares or riding on buses and performing. Moments like that felt more real than anything we'd ever done before.

— Jack White, on the effect playing in remote places had on the band

Under Great White Northern Lights documents the White Stripes' summer 2007 tour across Canada in support of the album Icky Thump, in which they performed in every province and territory. Jack White conceived the idea of touring Canada after learning that Scottish relatives on his father's side had lived for a few generations in Nova Scotia before relocating to Detroit to work in the car factories. The notion was a personal ambition, and he did not expect the tour to earn any money. Jack says that the White Stripes initially had not planned to film the tour, but decided to do so shortly before leaving at the suggestion of their manager.

=== Production ===
The film was directed by a friend of the duo, Emmett Malloy. It contains both live concert and off-stage footage. The bulk of the filming took place in Yukon, the Northwest Territories, Nunavut and Nova Scotia. Interspersed between concert footage are clips of them performing surprise gigs in public, including in a bowling alley, on a boat, and on a bus. In an outdoor stage in Newfoundland and Labrador, they played a single note, fulfilling their mission to play every province. They also met, played music, and ate raw caribou with a group of Inuit elders in Nunavut. Their 10th anniversary occurred during the tour on the day of their show at the Savoy Theatre in Glace Bay, Nova Scotia, which they celebrated with a personal party. The film ends with footage of them after the concert later that evening; Jack plays "White Moon" for Meg on piano, which leaves her crying silently in his arms. When asked about the ending, the director recounted, "There was nothing sad about that moment, but it was an intense moment. These two have been through a lot — every deep relationship, whether it be brother and sister or husband and wife."

=== Promotion and release ===
The White Stripes' Under Great White Northern Lights made appearances at film festivals internationally. It premiered at the Toronto International Film Festival on September 18, 2009. Jack and Meg appeared at the premiere and made a short speech before the movie started about their love of Canada and why they chose to debut their movie in Toronto; they watched it together for the first time that night. The film had its US premiere at the South by Southwest Festival in March 2010. The band provided advanced-screening kits that allowed fans to hold local premiere in their own spaces. The actual DVD was released on March 16, 2010.

=== Reception ===
Under Great White Northern Lights received largely positive reviews from critics and enjoyed commercial success, reaching number one on Billboard's Top Music Video sales. Metacritic gave the live release a 78/100 based on 16 critical reviews, indicating "generally favorable reviews". Rolling Stone gave the DVD release 4 out of 5 stars. Entertainment Weekly gave the live release an A, saying that "this concert CD/DVD does a great job of highlighting both sides of the Stripes' carefully controlled public persona," and that "if UGWNL is their last hurrah, it's one hell of a goodbye." Slant Magazine gave the album 3.5 out of five stars and The A.V. Club gave the DVD release a B+. Robert Christgau gave it a one-star honorable mention, saying, "The present-day guitar god refuses to die." The box set won a Grammy for Best Boxed or Special Limited Edition Package.

Several outlets commented on how the film's behind-the-scenes footage highlighted the difference between Jack's extroverted, "boisterous" personality and Meg's quiet nature—with her statements even being put in subtitles. Rolling Stone noted that Meg's shyness "gives the film a subtext", considering that, shortly after the conclusion of the Canadian leg, the band canceled the rest of their tour dates due to her "acute anxiety," and never played another concert.

== Album ==
Under Great White Northern Lights

Live album by the White Stripes
- Released: March 16, 2010
- Recorded: 2007
- Venue: Canada
- Genres: Alternative rock, garage rock, punk blues, blues rock
- Length: 59:14
- Label: Third Man

The White Stripes chronology
| Icky Thump (2007) | Under Great White Northern Lights (2010) | Live in Mississippi (2011) |

Under Great White Northern Lights is the first live album from the White Stripes for the 2009 rockumentary film of the same name covering the band's summer 2007 tour in Canada. The album featured songs recorded by the band, during their tour and has accompanied the film's DVD release on March 16, 2010. Third Man Records distributed the album in CD and vinyl formats, which also included a box set. At the 53rd Annual Grammy Awards, the box set won Best Boxed or Special Limited Edition Package.

=== Release ===
The album was released on March 16, 2010 by Third Man Records and Warner Bros. Records in the United States and Canada, and XL Recordings internationally. A week ahead of its release, it was made available for an exclusive listen at the National Public Radio website. It is available as both a CD and 180-gram vinyl LP.

A limited edition box set containing the film was released on March 16, 2010. The box set includes the documentary, the 16-track live album CD, and the same 16-track live album on 180-gram vinyl. Exclusive components to the box set includes a live 7" single featuring "Icky Thump" on one side and "The Wheels on the Bus" (records live in Winnipeg on July 2, 2007) on the other, a 208-page hardcover book of photographs from the tour, one of six possible silkscreen prints, and a DVD of the band's 10th anniversary show in Glace Bay, Nova Scotia, entitled Under Nova Scotian Lights.

=== Reception ===
Aggregator Metacritic, which uses a weighted average, assigned Under Great White Northern Lights a score of 78 out of 100 based on 16 critics, indicating "generally favorable reviews".

Ryan Dombal of Pitchfork felt that the box set reinforces "the White Stripes' mythology and displays the awesome power of their live show". Commenting on the songs and the packaging, he felt that it "sounds ridiculously heavy, with many songs easily trumping their studio counterparts, but the LP is also relatively linear and song-based". Martin Robinson of NME commented "The live album is built from tracks taken from different shows so doesn’t show off the improvisatory nature of their setlist-free shows, but again, it’s a reminder that their three-year absence is a bit of a tragedy." Heather Phares of AllMusic wrote "Since a big part of the Stripes’ live show also rests on their visuals, the Under Great White Northern Lights DVD gives the complete experience, but this album is satisfying enough to make it a must for most fans."

Whitney Pastorek of Entertainment Weekly commented that the album "does a great job of highlighting both sides of The White Stripes' carefully controlled public persona." Anthony Lombardi of PopMatters wrote "Under Great White Northern Lights feels like an appropriate recap of the unprecedented path the White Stripes have blazed over the past decade. For as long as the lack of a proper live release has created a hole in their otherwise peerless catalog, the delayed appearance of this record was well worth the wait and is an inarguably deserving crown on the superlative career-thus-far of Jack and Meg. If you’ve regrettably missed out on the band’s raging, unrivaled live show, this set does the volume-cranking, sweltering intensity they create some overdue justice. As a stand-alone release, it’s impressive; as a document and celebration of the greatest band of 21st century (sorry, Radiohead), it’s imperative." Andrzej Lukowski of Drowned in Sound wrote "It looks likely that a new record will happen, which is good, because Under Great White Northern Lights would be a funny postscript. It's not particularly revelatory, less cohesive a concert film than Under Blackpool Lights, and in no way intimates that the band was about to go into hiatus. Really, it serves, more than anything else, as a reminder of just how singularly odd the White Stripes are, and how boring things are without them around."

Jesse Cataldo of Slant Magazine wrote "This isn’t the first album to communicate that feeling, but it does it with a wonderful level of abandon. In achieving this, Northern Lights captures the live show as circus, the aura where group participation and the raggedness of improvisation supersedes a faithful rendering of songs, an interpretation that, if not always satisfying to listen to, is at least fascinating to behold." Chris Coplan of Consequence commented "Each track is darker and deeper and more bluesy and eccentric and haggard and just as beautifully catchy." Will Dean of The Guardian wrote "UGWNL is a live album for those who were there, and unless you're one of 600 Iqalummiut fans, you probably weren't." Andy Gill of The Independent commented that the album and the film is "a strong affirmation of the principles of directness and immediacy which have served The White Stripes so well."

=== Track listing ===
All lyrics are written by Jack White, except where noted; all music is composed by Jack and Meg White, except where noted.

| No. | Title | Writer(s) | Length |
|---|---|---|---|
| 1. | "Let's Shake Hands" | | 3:13 |
| 2. | "Black Math" | | 3:06 |
| 3. | "Little Ghost" | | 2:23 |
| 4. | "Blue Orchid" | | 2:55 |
| 5. | "The Union Forever" | | 4:26 |
| 6. | "Ball and Biscuit" (incorporating portions of I Believe I'll Dust My Broom and Phonograph Blues both by Robert Johnson) | | 3:08 |
| 7. | "Icky Thump" | | 4:13 |
| 8. | "I'm Slowly Turning Into You" | | 5:33 |
| 9. | "Jolene" | Dolly Parton | 3:55 |
| 10. | "300 M.P.H. Torrential Outpour Blues" | | 4:52 |
| 11. | "We Are Going to Be Friends" | | 2:24 |
| 12. | "I Just Don't Know What to Do with Myself" | Burt Bacharach, Hal David | 3:11 |
| 13. | "Prickly Thorn, But Sweetly Worn" | | 3:23 |
| 14. | "Fell in Love with a Girl" | | 2:26 |
| 15. | "When I Hear My Name" | | 2:40 |
| 16. | "Seven Nation Army" | | 7:32 |

=== Personnel ===
- Jack White – vocals, guitars, keyboards, synthesizer
- Meg White – drums, percussion, vocals
- Hector MacIsaac – bagpipes

=== Chart performance ===
| Chart (2010) | Peak position |
|---|---|
| Australian Albums (ARIA) | 33 |
| Austrian Albums (Ö3 Austria) | 19 |
| Belgian Albums (Ultratop Flanders) | 30 |
| Belgian Albums (Ultratop Wallonia) | 31 |
| Canadian Albums (Billboard) | 4 |
| Dutch Albums (Album Top 100) | 54 |
| French Albums (SNEP) | 54 |
| German Albums (Offizielle Top 100) | 41 |
| Greek Albums (IFPI) | 3 |
| Irish Albums (IRMA) | 48 |
| New Zealand Albums (RMNZ) | 8 |
| Norwegian Albums (VG-lista) | 23 |
| Spanish Albums (Promusicae) | 84 |
| Scottish Albums (Official Charts) | 24 |
| Swedish Albums (Sverigetopplistan) | 47 |
| Swiss Albums (Schweizer Hitparade) | 27 |
| UK Albums (Official Charts) | 25 |
| US Billboard 200 | 11 |
| US Top Alternative Albums (Billboard) | 3 |
| US Top Rock Albums (Billboard) | 4 |

=== Certifications ===
| Region | Certification | Certified units/sales |
|---|---|---|
| United Kingdom (BPI) | Silver | 60,000^{‡} |
^{‡} Sales+streaming figures based on certification alone.
