= Corky Robbins =

American songwriter

Background information
- Born: Margaret Johnson Bosworth
- Occupation: Singer-songwriter
- Label: OKeh Records

Corky Robbins, the stage name of Margaret Johnson Bosworth, was an American singer and songwriter. "Whispering Winds" and "Conquest" were two of her most successful compositions. The later song was also recorded by The White Stripes.

A graduate of the College Conservatory of Music, Robbins performed on the radio and in nightclubs. She also composed and performed as a duo with Johnny Bosworth.

Robbins and Bosworth recorded one single for Okeh Records ["I Won't Believe It" / "Oh How I Love You" (OKeh 6957, 1953)]. They were featured on two songs by Lucky Millinder and His Orchestra, "Loaded with Love" (1952) and "When I Gave You My Love" (1953). In 1955, Nat King Cole recorded the Robbins song "Don't Hurt the Girl" as a b-side to "My One Sin (In Life)".

In 1960, as Margaret Johnson Bosworth, she composed a 45-minute work for children's chorus, narrator, and solo baritone that premiered at the Cincinnati May Festival.

She died 15 May 1967 at her home in New York City.
