= Icky Thump (song) =

2007 single by the White Stripes

Single by the White Stripes

from the album Icky Thump
- Released: April 26, 2007
- Recorded: January 20–22, 2007
- Studio: Blackbird (Berry Hill, Tennessee)
- Genre: Garage rock; alternative rock; punk blues
- Length: 4:17 (album version); 3:50 (radio edit)
- Label: Warner Bros. (U.S.); XL Recordings (Europe)
- Composers: Jack White III, Meg White
- Lyricist: Jack White III
- Producer: Jack White III

The White Stripes singles chronology
"The Denial Twist" (2005)	"Icky Thump" (2007)	"Rag and Bone" (2007)

Music video
- "Icky Thump" on YouTube

"Icky Thump" is a song by American rock duo the White Stripes from their sixth and final album, Icky Thump (2007). It was released as the album's lead single by Warner Bros. and XL in April 2007. Written by Jack White and composed by the band, "Icky Thump" is a heavy garage rock piece with lyrics challenging anti-immigration pundits for their hypocrisy.

"Icky Thump" was acclaimed and won the Grammy Award for Best Rock Performance by a Duo or Group with Vocal; it peaked at number 26 on the US Billboard Hot 100 and number two on the UK singles chart, and was certified platinum. It was ranked by Rolling Stone and Triple J as one of the best songs of 2007.

== Background and recording ==
The name of the track comes from the north-English exclamation "Ecky thump!" (Both "ecky" and "thump" are euphemisms for hell.) The phrase was popularized in an episode of the British comedy series The Goodies. The album title was then changed to "Icky" to make it more accessible to American teenage audiences.

"Icky Thump" was recorded and mixed at Nashville's Blackbird Studio. The song was tracked on January 20 and 21, 2007. An attempted synth overdub was done on January 20 and guitar overdubs were done on January 21. Meg White and Jack White playing a 1959 Univox synth and the guitar solo were overdubbed on January 22, 2007. The guitar pedals used for the solo were a Zvex Wooly Mammoth and a DigiTech Whammy.

The B-side on the CD single, "Catch Hell Blues", was also recorded on January 20, 2007, with the B-side on the seven-inch single, "Baby Brother", recorded during the album sessions.

== Composition ==
Though grounded in straightforward garage rock to a greater degree than the Get Behind Me Satan singles, "Icky Thump" differed radically from previous White Stripes singles in its unusual construction: angular tempo-changes, stream-of-consciousness lyrics, and chaotic improvised snake-charming solos, played on a Univox synthesizer. The song deals with the topic of immigration to the United States, making it the first political White Stripes track since "The Big Three Killed My Baby". It criticized contemporary American immigration policy, with the defining verse against these policies coming near the end of the song:

White Americans
What? Nothin' better to do?
Why don't you kick yourself out
You're an immigrant too

Who's using who?
What should we do?
Well, you can't be a pimp
And a prostitute too

The lyrics talk about someone taking a trip to Mexico in a wagon, easily crossing the border to Mexico, as opposed to the difficulties illegal Mexican immigrants face while crossing northwards. It then mentions a Mexican lady giving him a bed to sleep in, then tying him up, assaulting him and holding him hostage. When finally able to escape, Jack decides to start doing his own house chores (referring, most likely, to the hiring of illegal immigrants as very low paid house servants).

== Release and reception ==
"Icky Thump" was made available online through the United States and Canada iTunes Store on Thursday, April 26, 2007. The single reached number 26 on the Billboard Hot 100 and became the group's only Top 40 single on that chart. The song also reached number one (for three weeks) on the Alternative Songs chart and number 11 on the Hot Mainstream Rock Tracks chart. The song also ended the 15-week run of "What I've Done" by Linkin Park at the top of the Modern Rock Tracks chart when the song rose to the top of that chart in August. It was the second song by the White Stripes to top the chart, after "Seven Nation Army". It ended up being certified both Gold for physical shipments and Platinum for digital sales in the US.

Third Man Records/XL Recordings also released CD and vinyl versions of the "Icky Thump" single on June 11, 2007, in the UK. It is to date the duo's biggest UK chart hit, debuting at number 13 in the UK Singles Chart via download sales alone and peaking at number two the following week, marking their first UK Top 3 single, and was kept off the number-one spot by "Umbrella" by Rihanna featuring Jay-Z. On the Scottish Singles Chart, however, the song dethroned "Umbrella" to claim the number-one spot. After peaking, the song very quickly dropped out of the Top 100, spending only seven weeks on both charts and ending 2007 as the UK's 122nd best-selling song.

This song was number 17 on Rolling Stone's list of the 100 Best Songs of 2007. On December 6, 2007, "Icky Thump" was nominated for two 2007 Grammy Awards: Best Rock Song and Best Rock Performance by a Duo or Group with Vocal, winning the latter category. In Australia, where the song reached number 46, the song was number 23 on the Triple J Hottest 100 of 2007.

== Music video ==
The music video for "Icky Thump" premiered on AOL.com at midnight EDT on May 23, 2007. The video was co-directed by Jack and the Malloy Brothers, and it stars both Jack and Meg. The video was filmed in Nashville, Tennessee, though it is set in Mexico. It features Spanish subtitles acting as a translation of the lyrics. The video debuted on MTV's Total Request Live on July 17, 2007, marking the first time a White Stripes video was ever on the countdown.

== Legacy ==
"Icky Thump" has been featured in films such as The Other Guys (2010), Zack Snyder's Justice League (2021), and in a Dancing with the Stars performance by Robert Irwin and Witney Carson (2025). It was also used in a special footage clip of Justice League shown at the 2016 San Diego Comic-Con.

=== Icky Trump ===
During the campaigning for the 2016 United States presidential election, then Republican candidate Donald Trump used one of the White Stripes' most iconic tracks, "Seven Nation Army" in a campaign video, much to the dismay of Jack White, a staunch Democrat and supporter of Bernie Sanders; White has even performed music as an opening act for Sanders' rallies, as if opening for a concert. In response, Jack and Meg White posted on the White Stripes Facebook page together for the first time in five years in a since-deleted post to threaten legal action (nothing came of this threat, though they did have a valid basis for a case), as Trump's campaign had done so without the permission of the White Stripes or Third Man Records, in violation of U.S. Copyright Law. It also stated that they were "disgusted by this association, and by the illegal use of their song" and that they had "nothing whatsoever to do with this video".

In further response, the band, through the online TMR merchandise store, released a T-shirt referred to by the website as the "Anti Trump Unisex T Shirt", reusing the colors and font from the Make America Great Again campaign's iconic hats, that read "Icky Trump" on the front, wordplay on Donald Trump's last name. The back of the shirts reused the aforementioned immigration verses, starting with "White Americans" and including everything up to and including "...And a prostitute too." Interestingly, the first two lines read "White Americans? What? / Nothing better to do?" while the original official lyrics (present on the vinyl record's sleeve) read "White Americans, what? / Nothing better to do". The shirt was available for sale only during the election campaigning, then went back up in October 2020, when Donald Trump was once again running for U.S. President. Again, they were discontinued after the election finished. During the 2024 election, the shirt appeared on the band's store for a third time, but disappeared once more after the election ended.

== Track listings ==
7-inch white vinyl (companion to the NME-distributed record that was given away with copies of the magazine on stands June 6)

1. "Icky Thump"
2. "Etching" (no audio)

Standard 7-inch

1. "Icky Thump"
2. "Baby Brother"

CD single

1. "Icky Thump" – 4:18
2. "Catch Hell Blues" – 4:16

== Personnel ==
Credits adapted from CD single liner notes.

The White Stripes

- Jack White – vocals, guitar, Univox synthesizer, production, mixing
- Meg White – drums, Univox synthesizer

Additional personnel

- Joe Chiccarelli – mixing
- Vlado Meller – mastering
- Rob Jones – design

== Charts ==
=== Weekly charts ===
Weekly chart performance for "Icky Thump"
Chart (2007)	Peak position
Australia (ARIA)	46
Austria (Ö3 Austria Top 40)	60
Belgium (Ultratop 50 Flanders)	49
Belgium (Ultratip Bubbling Under Wallonia)	9
Canada Hot 100 (Billboard)	9
Canada Rock (Billboard)	5
Denmark (Tracklisten)	4
Europe (Eurochart Hot 100)	9
France (SNEP)	82
Ireland (IRMA)	21
Scotland Singles (OCC)	1
UK Singles (OCC)	2
UK Indie (OCC)	1
US Billboard Hot 100	26
US Alternative Airplay (Billboard)	1
US Mainstream Rock (Billboard)	11

=== Year-end charts ===
Year-end chart performance for "Icky Thump"
Chart (2007)	Position
UK Singles (OCC)	122
US Alternative Songs (Billboard)	5

== Certifications ==
Certiciations and sales for "Icky Thump"
Region	Certification	Certified units/sales
New Zealand (RMNZ)	Platinum	30,000^{‡}
United Kingdom (BPI)	Silver	200,000^{‡}
United States (RIAA)	Platinum	1,000,000^{*}
^{*} Sales figures based on certification alone.^{‡} Sales+streaming figures based on certification alone.
