= Ice Cream Man (business) =

American food company

Ice Cream Man logo

Ice Cream Man is a business entity that gave away 500,000 free units of ice cream since its founding in 2004 In the process the organization became a fixture at music festivals across the United States. Ice Cream Man had over 100 volunteers committed to the idea of free ice cream for all.

== History ==
Ice Cream Man was founded by Matt Allen (a.k.a. Ice Cream Man), a resident of Long Beach, California. In the summer of 2004 Allen purchased a 1969 Chevrolet Step-Van in order to work as an ice cream man in Ashland, Oregon. At the end of the summer he decided to give away the leftover inventory to Ashland residents in the venue of an ice cream social at Garfield Park. The novelty of free ice cream garnered the attention of local news media and inspired Allen to base a startup project on the idea.

Ice Cream Man gained major media exposure when it was granted backstage access at the main stage of Lollapalooza 2006. Soon after, Ice Cream Man began receiving interview requests and attention from future sponsors. Since 2006, Ice Cream Man has been a backstage fixture at almost every US rock music festival including Lollapalooza, Sasquatch! Music Festival, Bonnaroo, Pitchfork Music Festival, ATP, Austin City Limits, SXSW, and Outside Lands Music Festival.

== Business model ==
Ice Cream Man’s business model is based on mutual exposure and advertisement. In exchange for funding of its operations, Ice Cream Man attempts to increase word-of-mouth promotion and build a popular association between its sponsors, free ice cream and the experience of music events. In this way, Allen states, Ice Cream Man is trying to establish a foothold in what he believes is a growing experience economy. The foremost example of Ice Cream Man’s business model is its use of two Yaris hatchbacks from Toyota as ice cream delivery vehicles for the 2009 summer season.

== See also ==
- Ice cream van
