= Meg White =

American musician (born 1974)

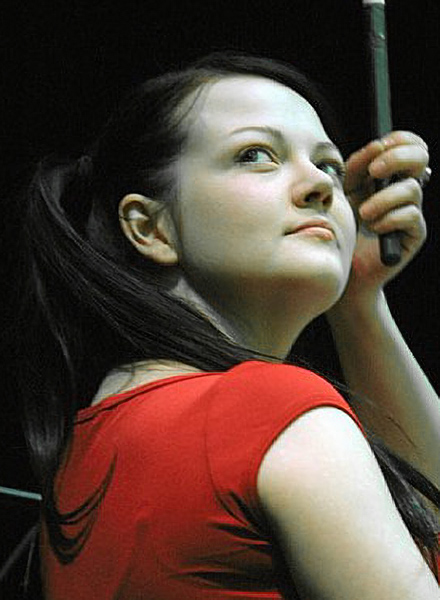
- White in 2006
- Born: Megan Martha White; December 10, 1974 (age 51); Grosse Pointe Farms, Michigan, US
- Occupations: Musician; composer; singer; actress; model
- Spouses: Jack Gillis (m. 1996; div. 2000); Jackson Smith (m. 2009; div. 2013)
- Musical career
- Genres: Alternative rock; blues rock; garage rock; indie rock; punk blues
- Instruments: Drums; vocals
- Years active: 1997–2011
- Formerly of: The White Stripes

Megan Martha White (born December 10, 1974) is an American musician who was the drummer and backing vocalist of the rock duo the White Stripes. She was a key artist of the 2000s indie and garage rock movements, noted for her minimalist drumming style and reserved public persona. The White Stripes disbanded in 2011; her last media appearance was in 2009, and she has not publicly performed since.

Born in Grosse Pointe Farms, Michigan, White met Jack Gillis in the early 1990s and the two married in 1996, with Jack taking her surname. She began playing the drums in 1997, and formed the White Stripes with Jack that year. They divorced in 2000, but continued performing at her insistence, presenting themselves to the music press as siblings. The band achieved international fame with four acclaimed albums released in the 2000s, establishing White as a leading figure in the decade's rock revival. She also had a short stint in acting and modeling, appearing in the 2003 film Coffee and Cigarettes and working for Marc Jacobs and Elle in 2006. She was married to guitarist Jackson Smith from 2009 to 2013.

White's drumming initially polarized critics but has since become highly regarded and continually discussed. She has maintained an elusive media image and has given few interviews, which she attributes to shyness and a reclusive nature. With the White Stripes, she won six Grammy Awards and was inducted into the Rock and Roll Hall of Fame in 2025. Publications such as NME and Rolling Stone rank her among the greatest drummers in history.

== Early life ==
Megan Martha White was born on December 10, 1974, in Grosse Pointe Farms, Michigan to Catherine and Walter Hackett White Jr. She has an older sister, Heather, and is of Scottish heritage. She grew up in the middle-class Detroit suburb of Grosse Pointe Woods, Michigan, describing her childhood as "pretty normal" and non-religious. As a teenager, she lived in Hamtramck, Michigan, and graduated from Grosse Pointe North High School, where she had a reputation for her artistic hobbies and quiet nature. She did not believe a career in music was feasible and instead aspired to pursue a "sensible" career such as healthcare.

During her senior year in 1993, White met musician and fellow high school senior Jack Gillis at a coffee shop in either Ferndale, Michigan or Hamtramck. They formed a relationship and married three years later in September 1996, with Jack taking her last name. They divorced in March 2000, though they continued residing in a house Jack purchased from his parents until 2003. She took on bartending jobs to pay for college, then attended a culinary school to pursue a career as a chef; she stated that, at that age, she was "super-shy" and lacked direction. She worked at a restaurant in downtown Royal Oak with Electric Six drummer Corey Martin.

== Career ==
=== 1997–2000: Formation of the White Stripes ===
In 1997, White began learning to play the drums using Jack's drum kit, who later recalled her playing as "liberating and refreshing", opening up "something" within him. White chose to play the drums because, despite her timid personality, the drums gave her the ability to make noise. The two then formed the White Stripes, and stuck to certain motifs: presenting themselves as siblings to an unknowing public, and keeping to a three-part color scheme, dressing only in red, white, and black. She also often dyed her hair black to match Jack's. They played their first show at the Gold Dollar in Detroit, and achieved popularity in Michigan's underground garage rock scene, performing with established local bands such as Bantam Rooster and the Dirtbombs. In 1998, they were approached by Dave Buick of the Detroit-based independent record label Italy Records, who offered to pay for their debut single. "Let's Shake Hands" was then released in February 1998.

White performing at Club Shinjuku Jam, Tokyo, in 2000

In 1999, the White Stripes signed with the California-based independent label Sympathy for the Record Industry and released their self-titled debut album that year to generally positive reviews. Although they divorced in 2000, they kept the band going at White's insistence. Their second album, De Stijl, was recorded sporadically at home in their living room in early 2000 and released under Sympathy that same year. Rolling Stone's Jenny Eliscu believed White's minimalist drumming proved that "you don't need bombast to make a blues explosion." De Stijl would become a sleeper hit after the White Stripes gained popularity in 2002. White also contributed percussion to the Soledad Brothers' self-titled debut album (2000), being credited as the "third Soledad brother".

=== 2001–2006: Mainstream breakthrough ===
The White Stripes released their third album, White Blood Cells, in 2001. Meg shared vocals with Jack on the tracks "Hotel Yorba" and "This Protector", and also on the Loretta Lynn cover "Rated X", featured as the B-side to "Hotel Yorba". It was their last album to be released with Sympathy, after which they signed a licensing deal with V2 Records through Jack's own label, Third Man Records. White Blood Cells was given a major label reissue in 2002, which brought them to the forefront of the garage rock revival and made them one of the most acclaimed bands of the year. Chris Deville of Stereogum praised White for bashing "the bejesus out of her drums" and called the pair "too compelling for the rest of the world to ignore." The album included the single "Fell in Love with a Girl", which won the band three awards at the 2002 MTV Video Music Awards. They were named Rolling Stone's 2002 People of the Year, and White appeared on NME's Cool List in 2002 and 2003.

The White Stripes performing at the Aragon Ballroom in 2003

The White Stripes released their fourth studio album, Elephant, in 2003 to critical acclaim. The band's continued success helped establish White as a key figure in 2000s rock, and both Elephant and White Blood Cells were included on numerous editions of Rolling Stone's "500 Greatest Albums of All Time" list. By this point, White's drumming became a focal point of the band, described as "hypnotic" and "explosively minimal" by Phares, and "simple but effective" by Chuck Taylor from Billboard. The album's first single, "Seven Nation Army", became the band's signature song and a sports anthem. Alexis Petridis of The Guardian considers "The Hardest Button to Button", the third single, to feature some of her best drumming. The track "In the Cold, Cold Night" additionally features White singing lead for the first time, with her voice being described as "delicate and sweet" in another Billboard article by Andrew Katchen. Petridis deemed all three songs to be among the greatest made by the band. Elephant won the Grammy Awards for Best Alternative Music Album and Best Rock Song ("Seven Nation Army").

White made her film debut appearing with Jack in Jim Jarmusch's 2003 film Coffee and Cigarettes. They star as fictionalized versions of themselves in the segment "Jack Shows Meg His Tesla Coil", which expands on Nikola Tesla and White Stripes motifs such as childhood innocence. She described her acting debut as "easier than I thought it was gonna be", and said she became "more confident than I used to be, but not much." Jarmusch believed that "she could have been a huge silent-movie star, just from her face." That same year, White began appearing on Late Night with Conan O'Brien as a recurring performer. In 2004, she starred in the band's first music film Under Blackpool Lights, which was shot entirely on super 8 film. Jamie Russell of BBC described her performance as "orgasmically pounding the drums" and "exhilarating." White appears on the cover of Whirlwind Heat's single "Pink" (2004) wearing a bunny costume; the photo was taken while the White Stripes and Whirlwind Heat toured together in Japan. Also in 2004, White appeared in an episode of Pancake Mountain and played Little Red Riding Hood in the music video for "Cha Cha Twist" by the Detroit Cobras.

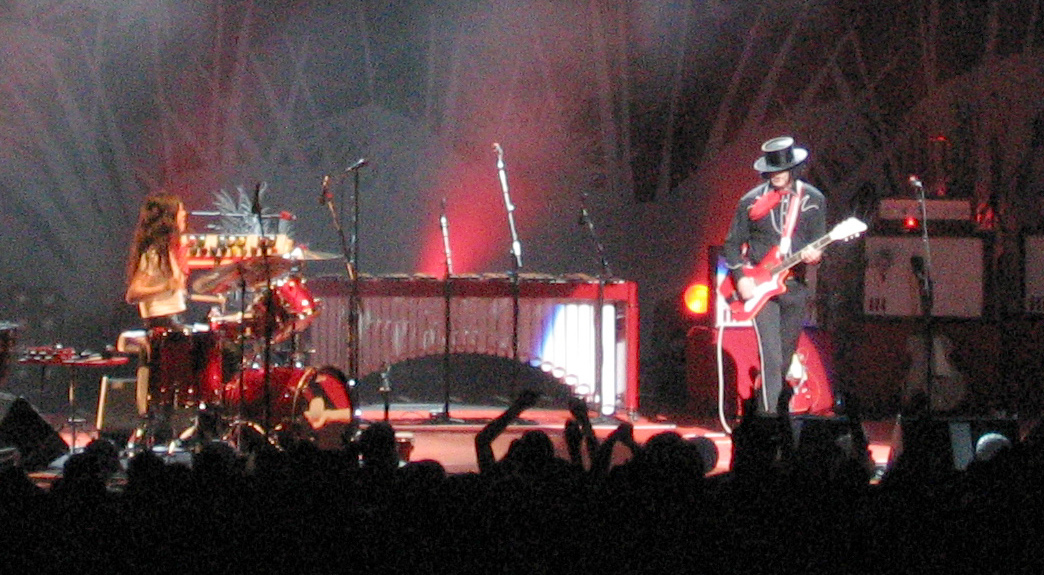
The White Stripes performing at Bell Centre in 2005

The White Stripes experimented with their sound on their fifth album, Get Behind Me Satan, with White using other percussion instruments like bells and tambourines. The album was released in 2005 and won the band their second Grammy for Best Alternative Music Album. White performed lead vocals on "Passive Manipulation", for which Rob Sheffield of Rolling Stone described her vocals as "chilling" while Matthew Murphy of Pitchfork thought that the song "begs the gentle suggestion that Meg not be allowed to sing lead." She appears in the documentary The Fearless Freaks (2005), which chronicles the rock band the Flaming Lips.

White modeled for Marc Jacobs' 2006 Spring line and the March 2006 issue of Elle. She was chosen to compose a drum theme for the film Let's Go to Prison (2006) by director Bob Odenkirk; however, it was removed. The White Stripes guest-starred on The Simpsons in September 2006, appearing in the episode "Jazzy and the Pussycats" where the music video of "The Hardest Button to Button" is parodied. She had previously expressed interest in a Simpsons role, saying: "A guest appearance would be amazing. I wouldn't want to be in a Lisa episode. They're kind of boring. Maybe a Homer one would be better." At the end of the decade, Simon Crerar of The Times rated it as one of the funniest Simpsons cameos.

=== 2007–2011: Later works and disbandment ===
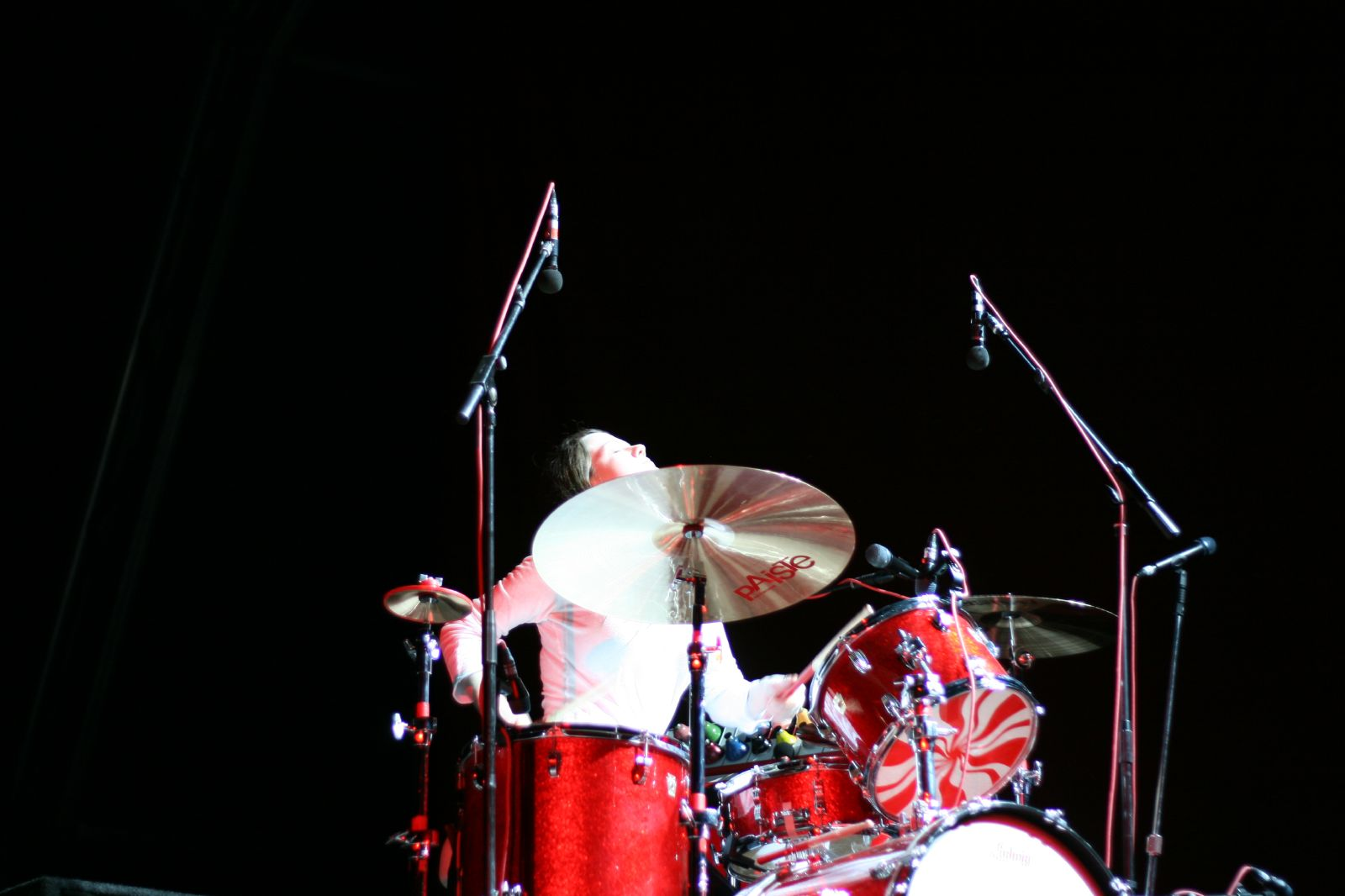
White performing at Primavera Sound in 2007

The White Stripes released their sixth and final album, Icky Thump, in 2007, which won the Grammys for Best Alternative Music Album and Best Rock Song ("Icky Thump"). In addition to drumming, White played synthesizers, spoke on the bagpipe-heavy track "St. Andrew (This Battle Is in the Air)" and provided backing vocals across the album. She was greatly praised by Alexis Petridis for her drumming, while "St. Andrew" was ambivalently received by critics; NME dubbed her spoken performance "frantic" and "the weirdest thing" the band ever recorded, and Spin's Brian Raftery called it "a waste of hard-drive space."

In the summer of 2007, before a show in Southaven, Mississippi, Ben Blackwell (Jack's nephew and the group's archivist) recalls that Meg approached him and said: "This is the last White Stripes show." He asked if she meant of the tour, but she responded: "No. I think this is the last show, period." In September 2007, the band canceled numerous tour dates due to White's acute anxiety. In an interview with Music Radar, Jack attributed her health issues to the combination of a very short pre-tour rehearsal time—that was further reduced by the birth of his son—and a hectic, multi-continental touring schedule. He worked with other artists in the meantime while Meg remained largely out of the public eye, though she participated in releasing limited-edition Holga cameras in February 2008, and appeared briefly onstage during an encore set of a Detroit show with one of Jack's bands, the Raconteurs, in June 2008. She features in the documentary It Might Get Loud (2008), which explores the music careers of Jack, Jimmy Page of Led Zeppelin, and the Edge of U2.

On February 20, 2009, the White Stripes reunited to perform "We're Going to Be Friends" on the last episode of Late Night with Conan O'Brien, which is White's last media appearance to date as of 2026. A documentary about their Canadian tour—titled The White Stripes: Under Great White Northern Lights—premiered at the Toronto International Film Festival on September 18, 2009. Directed by Emmett Malloy, the film documents the band's summer 2007 tour across Canada and contains live concert and off-stage footage. Vanity Fair's Bill Bradley observed White as "road-weary and worn-out" by the end of the film.

On February 2, 2011, the White Stripes announced they were disbanding. A statement posted to their official website said it was not due to health issues or artistic differences, but "mostly to preserve what is beautiful and special about the band." White has not performed since.

== Artistry ==
=== Equipment ===
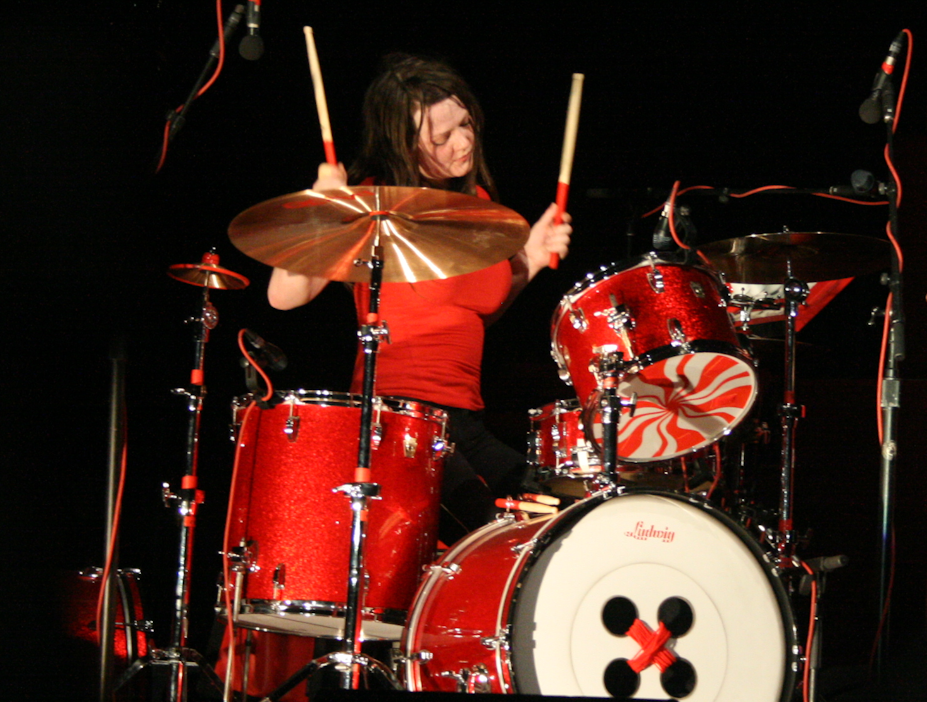
White (pictured in 2007) adapted her kit for specific album eras such as Icky Thump

White exclusively played Ludwig Drums and Paiste cymbals, and from 2006, used 14" Signature Medium Hi-Hats, a 19" Signature Power Crash, and a 22" 2002 Ride. From their early years to Get Behind Me Satan, the heads of the toms and bass drum almost exclusively featured peppermint swirls. The idea came from Jack when they noticed a bag of peppermint candy in a drugstore and he said, "That should be painted on your bass drum because you've been drumming like a little kid." Her love of the candy inspired many of the White Stripes' artistic schemes, becoming signature in her kit and appearing in several live shows and music videos. The bass drum head design was switched during the Icky Thump tour to a button inspired by the Pearlies clothing the band wore for the album cover.

Though known for her drumming, White played other instruments for the White Stripes. Beginning in 2005, she incorporated different kinds of percussion instruments into her performances, such as bells, bongos, maracas, tambourine, and a triangle. On Icky Thump, she played synthesizers, specifically using the 1959 Univox synth.

=== Influences ===
White started collecting records with her sister and mother, particularly those of the Beatles and Bob Dylan, and grew up listening to country music. Dylan is her primary inspiration and favorite artist, leading to the White Stripes covering his songs "One More Cup of Coffee" and "Love Sick". Jack noted that her record collection was not only "twice as big as mine" but also contained more Dylan records than his own. Her other influences include proto-punk bands such as the MC5 and the Stooges, the blues musicians Son House, Blind Willie McTell, Robert Johnson, the country musicians Loretta Lynn and Dusty Springfield, the rock groups the Cramps and the Velvet Underground, and the punk-blues band the Gun Club. Specific inspirations for her drumming style include Art Blakey of the Jazz Messengers, Ringo Starr of the Beatles, Peggy O'Neill of the Gories, and Moe Tucker of the Velvet Underground, the latter of whom is often compared to White by music critics.

White career began in the late 1990s and early 2000s in Detroit's garage rock scene, amongst contemporaries the Dirtbombs, the Detroit Cobras, the Von Bondies and Soledad Brothers. She later collaborated with them and other Detroit-based bands for the compilation album Sympathetic Sounds of Detroit, recorded in Jack's living room.

=== Style ===
"Fell in Love With a Girl"
In "Fell in Love With a Girl", White plays a high-speed stuttering beat.

"Seven Nation Army"
The intro of "Seven Nation Army" featuring White's driving quarter note groove.

White co-wrote music for the White Stripes but did not write lyrics. Her pre-show warm up included "whiskey and Red Bull." She has described her "primal" approach to drumming as "my strength. A lot of drummers would feel weird about being that simplistic." She said she respects other techniques but that her style was best for the White Stripes. When some criticisms "really bother[s] her", she said that she reminds herself that her technique is important for the band and tries to take enjoyment from her work. Examples of her drum beats include "Fell in Love with a Girl", where she plays a "hyper, stuttering rock beat" with a skipped snare drum and prominent crash cymbals; and "Seven Nation Army", where she plays a driving quarter note groove which makes extensive use of the bass drum, hi-hat, and floor tom to mimic a heartbeat and punctuate the guitar, then introducing a snare drum before the chorus that carries into the chorus itself with a crash cymbal.

White's minimalistic drumming polarized contemporary critics. Dan Kilian and Ryan Schreiber of Pitchfork likened it to "a tornadic fury" and Richard Harrington of The Washington Post described her drumming as "loud and raucous—like the Carpenters on steroids", while Pitchfork's Brent DiCrescenzo described it as "pancake-handed" and "sloppy" and Ann Powers of The New York Times thought her "deliberately undeveloped approach" contrained the band. Critics have since lauded her "primal" style, with reappraisals surging in the 2020s after a journalist sparked discourse on Twitter, in a now-deleted viral tweet that saw several musicians and journalists come to her defense. The Rock and Roll Hall of Fame analyzed her drumming as "a primal, minimalist approach that gives the music its pulse and urgency", and Lindsay Zoladz of The New York Times similarly observed it "excel[s] at withholding, creating negative space and subverting expectation."

=== Vocals ===
"In the Cold, Cold Night"
"In the Cold, Cold Night" is White's first recorded lead vocal performance.

White frequently provided backing vocals for the White Stripes and occasionally sang lead, although she disliked listening to her own voice and was confused by the audience's "rapturous" cheers when she performed live. Her first recorded lead vocal was on the band's fourth album Elephant, after Jack wrote "In the Cold, Cold Night" specifically for her to sing. Critics have cited this as her signature track; Alexis Petridis of The Guardian described it as "her finest moment not as the White Stripes' drummer, but their vocalist", while writer Eric Alper suggested it validated her role in the band amidst the contemporary debate over her musical abilities. She later performed lead on "Passive Manipulation" from Get Behind Me Satan and performed the spoken word piece "St. Andrew (This Battle is in the Air)" from Icky Thump, as well as the B-side "Who's a Big Baby?".

== Legacy ==
With the White Stripes, White sold over 5 million albums and received numerous accolades, including a Brit Award from six nominations and six Grammy Awards from eleven nominations. The band were nominated in 2023 for the Rock and Roll Hall of Fame, and inducted in 2025, the third female drummer honored); she did not attend the ceremony, with Jack accepting the award and delivering a speech written by the duo. Additionally, she placed 81st on VH1's "Top 100 Greatest Women in Music" (2012), 94th on Rolling Stone's "100 Greatest Drummers of All Time" (2016), 12th on NME's "32 of the Best Drummers to Grace Rock 'n' Roll" (2018), and 88th on Consequence's "100 Best Drummers of All Time" (2024), among other listicles.

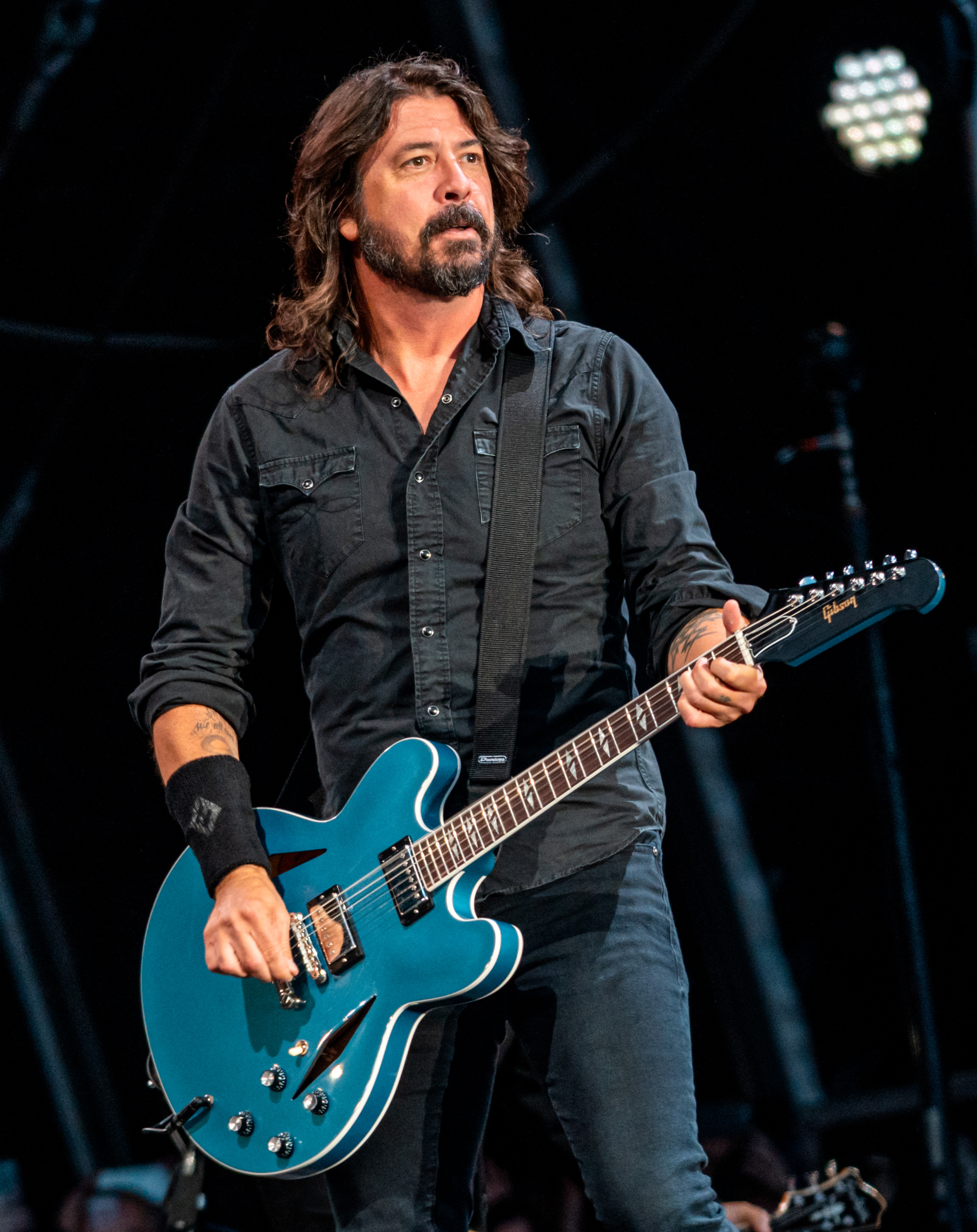
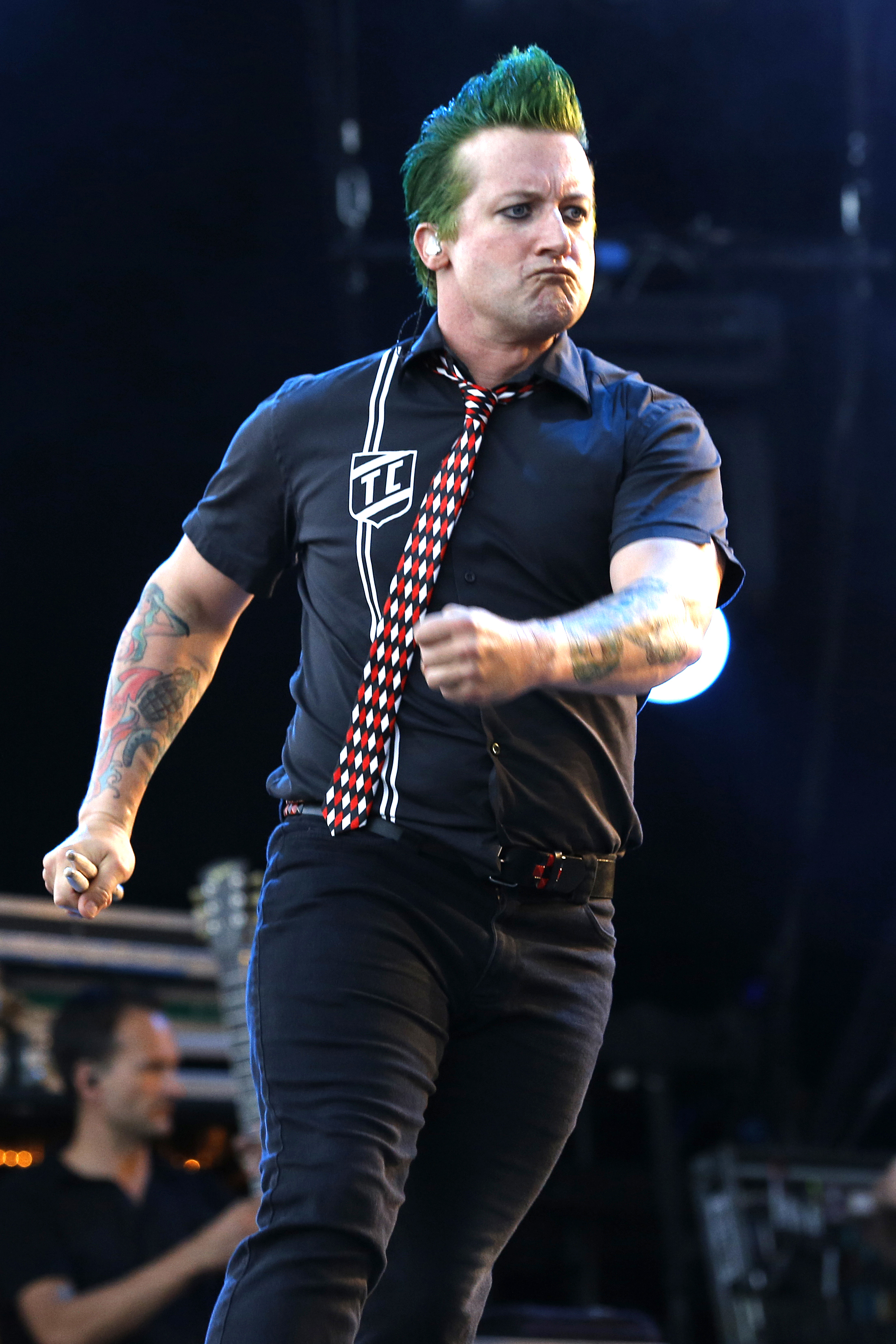
Musicians such as Dave Grohl (left) and Tré Cool (right) have praised White's drumming style.

White was a key figure in the 2000s indie and garage rock revivals, and she remains one of the most discussed drummers in rock music. Variety's Chris Willman observed that, in the aftermath of her departure from the music industry, White "absorbed into rock orthodoxy as a great drummer by near-acclamation" and is more recognized compared to her active years. Denis Loncaric of Drum! magazine declared that every drummer should know White, and the School of Rock company retrospectively praised her abilities and called her "iconic." Her life and career, as well as her reclusive nature and strict maintenance of her privacy, has also been the subject of significant commentary; as of 2026, she has not made any public appearances since 2009. Writers of The Guardian observed that, as a public figure, she "was often treated so poorly" and "got a raw deal during her White Stripes days." Talia Schlanger of NPR dubbed her the "21st century's loudest introvert", and writers of The New York Times championed her as a "feminist hero", an "icon for introverts", and "one of the great recluses of 21st-century pop."

Several musicians have praised her technique. Dave Grohl of Foo Fighters and previously Nirvana stated in an interview that she is "one of my favorite fucking drummers of all time. Like, nobody fucking plays the drums like that." Tom Morello of Rage Against the Machine wrote in an Instagram post that she "has style and swag and personality and oomph and taste and awesomeness that's off the charts and a vibe that's untouchable." Nandi Bushell has written that the White Stripes "moved me at 5 years old to want to play the drums and still move me today!" Tré Cool of Green Day called her one of his favorite drummers. Olivia Rodrigo and Margo Price have also been influenced by White, with the former stating that her drumming taught her "the value of simplicity in music."

In the film School of Rock (2003), the character Freddy Jones (Kevin Clark) declares that White "can't drum!" The claim is refuted by bass player Katie (Rivkah Reyes) who says "At least she has rhythm." She was portrayed by Drew Barrymore—whom White is a fan of—in a 2004 Saturday Night Live skit, in which she performs "Seven Nation Army" with Jimmy Fallon. On his album Gossip in the Grain (2008), Ray LaMontagne wrote and recorded a song named after White. Musicians Tracey Thorn and Wanda Jackson each covered "In the Cold, Cold Night" in 2012 and 2013, respectively, as tributes.

White's Pearl Export bass drum—complete with the original peppermint-painted bass drum that she used with the band's first show—and the Pearly Queen outfit she wore in the photos for the Icky Thump album, were featured in the Rock and Roll Hall of Fame "Women Who Rock" exhibition in 2011. The outfit was again featured in the class of 2025 exhibit after her induction that year.

== Personal life ==
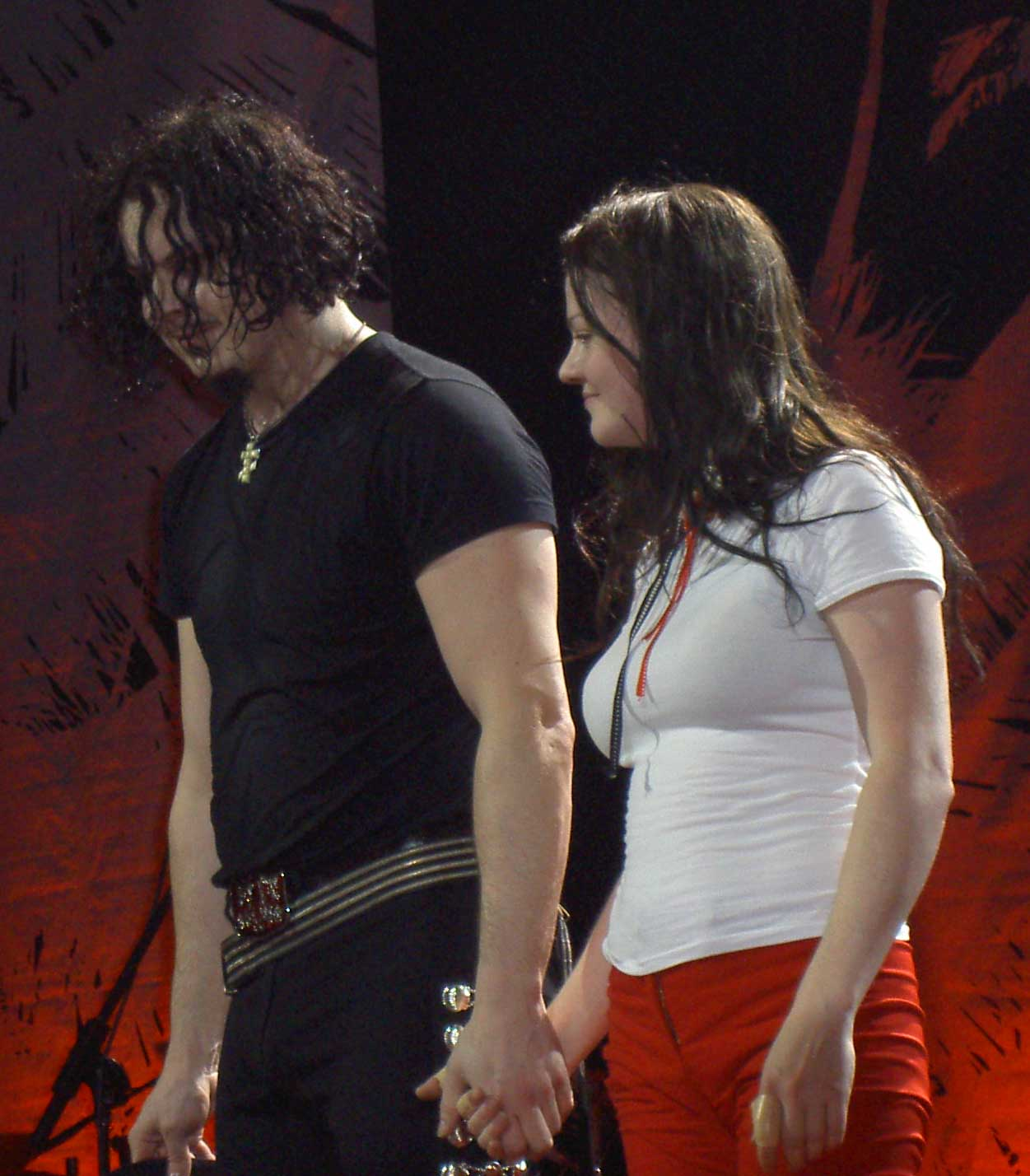
Jack and Meg White (pictured at the Bell Centre Arena in 2005) were married from 1996 to 2000

White married Jack White in September 1996, but they divorced in March 2000. She briefly dated the musician Oliver Henry of Soledad Brothers in the early 2000s, with whom she had earlier collaborated. She married guitarist Jackson Smith, the son of musicians Patti Smith and Fred "Sonic" Smith, in a small ceremony in Jack's backyard in Nashville, Tennessee in May 2009, but they divorced in July 2013.

White suffers from acute anxiety and low self-esteem, and has described herself as "very shy." She told Rolling Stone in 2005 that "the more you talk, the fewer people listen." She said in 2006 that she "always kind of lived in her own world" and "never really cared about all the things that other people cared about", for example public recognition. She told Nylon in 2007 that for her, being recognized in public "is like if your boss came every morning and tapped you on the head to wake you up, it's like, not now." She has chosen not to do solo interviews, though an Elle journalist communicated through her friends in 2023.

During the 2016 United States presidential election, White issued a joint statement with Jack criticizing Donald Trump after he used "Seven Nation Army" for his campaign without their consent. After the Trump campaign re-used the song in the 2024 United States presidential election, she and Jack filed a copyright infringement lawsuit in September 2024. The lawsuit was dropped in November 2024.

== Discography ==
With the White Stripes

Main article: The White Stripes discography
- The White Stripes (1999)
- De Stijl (2000)
- White Blood Cells (2001)
- Elephant (2003)
- Get Behind Me Satan (2005)
- Icky Thump (2007)

Other appearances

- Soledad Brothers (2000), by Soledad Brothers

Soundtracks

- Let's Go to Prison (2006; deleted)

== Filmography ==
=== Film ===
Year	Title	Role	Notes	Ref.
2003	Coffee and Cigarettes	Meg	Segment: "Jack Shows Meg His Tesla Coil"	
2004	Under Blackpool Lights	Herself	Concert film	
2005	The Fearless Freaks	Herself	Documentary	
2008	It Might Get Loud	Herself	Documentary	
2009	Under Great White Northern Lights	Herself	Rockumentary	

=== Television ===
Year	Title	Role	Notes	Ref.
2003–2009	Late Night with Conan O'Brien	Herself	Recurring guest	
2004	Pancake Mountain	Herself	Unknown episode	
2006	The Simpsons	Meg (voice)	Episode: "Jazzy and the Pussycats"	

=== Music videos ===
- "Cha Cha Twist" (2004), by The Detroit Cobras
