= Blackbird Studio =

Music recording studio in Berry Hill, Tennessee, US

Coordinates: 36°06′58″N 86°46′03″W

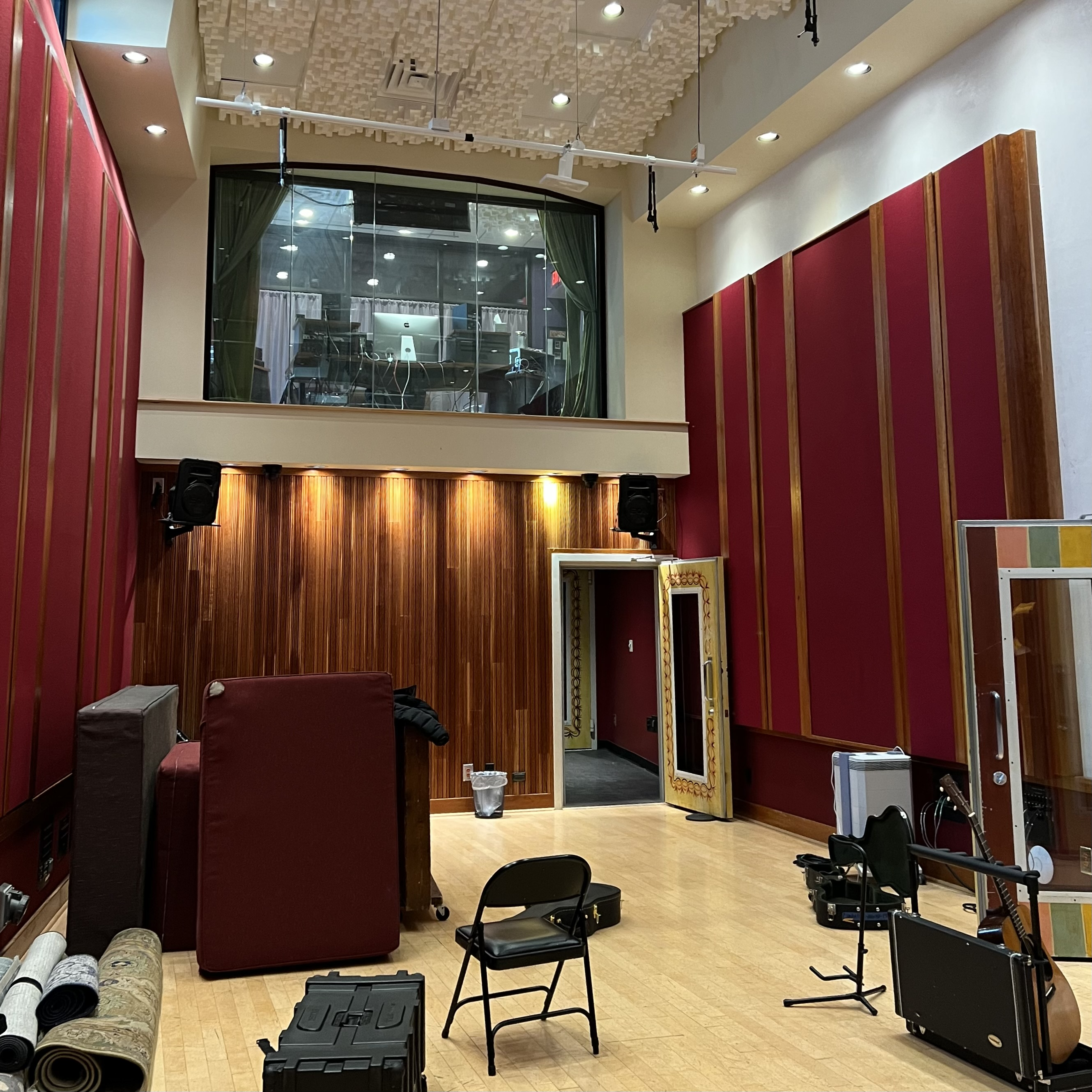
- Studio A Tracking Room
- Formerly: Creative Recording
- Industry: Recording studio
- Founded: Berry Hill, Tennessee, U.S. (2002)
- Founder: John McBride, Martina McBride
- Headquarters: Berry Hill, Tennessee, U.S.
- Number of locations: 1
- Website: blackbirdstudio.com

Blackbird Studio is a music recording studio located at 2806 Azalea Place in Berry Hill, Tennessee. Originally built as Creative Workshop II and later operated as Creative Recording, the studio changed ownership and was rebuilt and renamed Blackbird Studio in 2002. Blackbird has since become one of the largest recording facilities in Nashville, with one of the largest collections of vintage musical instruments and recording equipment in the United States.

== History ==
=== Creative Workshop II and Creative Recording ===
In 1982 songwriter and producer Buzz Cason expanded his Creative Workshop recording studio by building Creative Workshop II next door, designed by George Augspurger. In 1986, Cason sold Creative Workshop II to Creative's vice president, engineer and producer Brent Maher, who renamed the studio Creative Recording.

=== John and Martina McBride ===
John McBride, who had dreamed of owning his own recording studio but was turned down for an SBA loan and instead approved for a live sound system company, which he operated in his hometown of Wichita, Kansas. He met Martina and the two moved to Nashville, Tennessee, on New Year's Eve 1989. McBride joined Garth Brooks' sound crew and became Brooks' concert production manager, eventually selling his live sound company MD Systems to Clair Brothers in 1997. Over the next several years, McBride was buying recording equipment and building a studio in his garage.

=== Blackbird Studio ===
On January 15, 2002, the McBrides bought the Creative Recording studio located at 2806 Azalea Place in Berry Hill, an area sometimes referred to as the "Music Hill" counterpart to Nashville's "Music Row". An avid fan of the Beatles, McBride re-named the studio Blackbird Studio. Over the next year, McBride enlisted the help of audio engineer Vance Powell and invested $3 million to expand the 1970s-era George Augspurger-designed studio, partially motivated with providing his wife Martina with an improved recording space.

Initially a single-room studio, Blackbird's Studio A featured a Neve 8078 analog mixing console that was custom-built for Motown's Los Angeles studio before being owned and used by Donald Fagen. McBride purchased the console from Fagen in 2002, and restored and modified it for Blackbird. Studio A's live room features a moveable ceiling.

In 2004, McBride bought the land behind the initial building and built Studios C and D. Designed by George Massenburg and Mike Cronin, together with RPG Diffusor Systems founder Peter D'Antonio, Ph.D., Studio C features a primitive root sequence diffusor made up of 138,646 individual pieces of wood. Studio C originally featured an 80-channel SSL 9000K mixing console, while Studio D features a 96-channel API mixing console. Also in 2004, Blackbird Audio Rentals, headed by Rolff Zwiep, was launched to rent vintage and new equipment owned by the studio.

In 2006 Blackbird added Studio F, a 750 square foot mix room. Studio G, where Jacquire King established a residency from 2013 to 2019, has a modified Quad 8 console. In 2015, King was quoted as saying that Blackbird Studio G was his "favorite recording space in the world." At this time, with nine studios, Blackbird had become the largest recording facility in Nashville.

The studio is known for its collection of vintage recording gear, including one of the most extensive collections of vintage and new microphones, as well as its live rooms and echo chambers.

Producers and engineers working at Blackbird have included George Massenburg, Dann Huff, Tony Brown, Ethan Johns, Richard Dodd, Niko Bolas, Rob Cavallo, Peter Asher, Phil Ramone and many others.

== Education ==
In 2013, John McBride launched The Blackbird Academy at the studio, with its first Studio Engineering Program class beginning on September 30, 2013. The program trains students using the same microphones, consoles, outboard gear, and recording spaces used by professional engineers working at Blackbird Studio.
