= List of The Late Show with Stephen Colbert episodes (2015) =

- No. of episodes: 62

Release
- Original network: CBS
- Original release: September 8 – December 18, 2015

Season chronology
- ← Previous Next → 2016 episodes

This is the list of episodes of The Late Show with Stephen Colbert that aired in 2015.

== 2015 ==
=== September ===
No.	Original release date	Guest(s)	Musical/entertainment guest(s)
1	September 8, 2015	George Clooney, Governor Jeb Bush	Mavis Staples & Friends
The show opens with Stephen singing "The Star-Spangled Banner" with various people throughout the country, ending with a cameo by Jon Stewart as an umpire yelling "Play ball!". Stephen formally begins the show by introducing CBS president Les Moonves as an audience member, who is holding a switch that switches Stephen's show to a rerun of The Mentalist. He goes on to thank David Letterman (and Letterman stage manager Biff Henderson) for hosting the show for 22 years and showcases his new set to the audience. He explains that the set features a television that enables him to talk to Jimmy Fallon on the set of The Tonight Show Starring Jimmy Fallon, along with his Captain America's shield (which was carried over from The Colbert Report set), the pennant his mother received when she marched in 1963 and heard the Martin Luther King Jr. speech "I Have a Dream", and a cursed amulet that forces him to promote Sabra hummus. Later he allows himself to eat one Oreo cookie and share one Donald Trump news story, before spiraling out of control and eating several cookies and showing several Trump stories. George Clooney discusses his career and his "new movie", Decision Strike. Governor Jeb Bush discusses his presidential campaign. The musical segment of the show features a cast of celebrities joining the band singing "Everyday People": Mavis Staples, Buddy Guy, Derek Trucks, Ben Folds, Brittany Howard of Alabama Shakes, Aloe Blacc, Susan Tedeschi, Paul Janeway, Beirut band members Zach Condon, Kyle Resnick and Ben Lanz, with Stephen joining in to take a verse himself. Fallon congratulates Stephen in the locker room at the very end of the show.
2	September 9, 2015	Scarlett Johansson, Elon Musk	Kendrick Lamar
Stephen explains the technical difficulties he experienced during the making of his first show. The Big Furry Hat. Big Questions with Even Bigger Stars (with Scarlett Johansson). Elon Musk discusses SpaceX and his other projects. Kendrick Lamar performed a medley of songs from his album To Pimp a Butterfly.
3	September 10, 2015	Vice President Joe Biden, Travis Kalanick	Toby Keith
Joe Biden and Stephen discuss how the tragic losses of family members affected their lives. Travis Kalanick discusses Uber. Toby Keith performed "Rum is the Reason" off his album 35 MPH Town.
4	September 11, 2015	Amy Schumer, Stephen King	Troubled Waters
Stephen endorses Yesterday's Coffee. Amy Schumer discusses her new standup special, Amy Schumer: Live at the Apollo. Stephen Colbert's Unseen Mysteries of the Hidden Secrets. Stephen King discusses his new collection of short stories, The Bazaar of Bad Dreams. Troubled Waters performs "Me and Julio Down by the Schoolyard" with Stephen, as well as "American Tune" during the episode's outro.
5	September 14, 2015	Emily Blunt, Justice Stephen Breyer	The Dead Weather
Stephen faces off Novak Djokovic. Stephen Colbert Gets All Up in Your Faith. Emily Blunt discusses Sicario, in addition to having a vomit-off with Stephen. Justice Stephen Breyer discusses recent politics and his new book, The Court and the World. The Dead Weather performs "I Feel Love (Every Million Miles)" from their album Dodge and Burn.
6	September 15, 2015	Jake Gyllenhaal, Tim Cook	Run the Jewels with TV on the Radio
The Hungry for Power Games (Rick Perry). Jake Gyllenhaal discusses Everest. Tim Cook discusses the iPhone 6S. Run the Jewels & TV on the Radio perform "Angel Duster" from the album Run the Jewels 2.
7	September 16, 2015	Kevin Spacey, Carol Burnett	Willie Nelson & John Mellencamp
Carol Burnett discusses The Carol Burnett Show. Kevin Spacey discusses House of Cards. Planet of the Apps. Willie Nelson & John Mellencamp discuss Willie's Reserve and Farm Aid, and perform "Night Life".
8	September 17, 2015	Trevor Noah, Secretary-General Ban Ki-moon	Chris Stapleton
Trevor Noah discusses The Daily Show and the Republican Party presidential debate. Stephen launches his own lifestyle brand, Covetton House. Ban Ki-moon discusses recent politics. Chris Stapleton performs "Nobody to Blame" from his album Traveller.
9	September 18, 2015	Lupita Nyong'o, Senator Bernie Sanders, Christopher Wheeldon	Robert Fairchild and Leanne Cope
Lupita Nyong'o discusses Eclipsed and Star Wars: The Force Awakens. Bernie Sanders discusses his presidential campaign. Christopher Wheeldon discusses An American in Paris, as Robert Fairchild and Leanne Cope perform a selection from the play.
10	September 21, 2015	Stephen Curry, Senator Ted Cruz	Don Henley
Stephen Curry discusses NBA 2K16. Stephen vs. Stephen (Stephen and Stephen Curry). Ted Cruz discusses his presidential campaign. Don Henley performs "Too Much Pride" from his album Cass County.
11	September 22, 2015	Donald Trump, Dr. Ernest Moniz	Raury
The Hungry for Power Games (Scott Walker). Donald Trump discusses his presidential campaign. Trump or Colbert? Ernest Moniz discusses the Iran nuclear deal. Raury performs "Devil's Whisper" from his album All We Need.
12	September 23, 2015	Hugh Jackman with Hugh Evans, Senator Elizabeth Warren	Pearl Jam
Jon Batiste presents his "new book": Underneath the Chuckles: Life, Laughs, Loss, Love and Learning. Jackman and Evans discuss the Global Poverty Project. Senator Elizabeth Warren discusses the problems with the government. Pearl Jam discusses the Global Citizen Festival and performs "Mind Your Manners", plus a cover of "Rockin' in the Free World" joined by Stephen on vocals.
13	September 24, 2015	Jim Gaffigan, Maria Shriver, Andrew Sullivan, Archbishop Thomas Wenski	The YMCA Jerusalem Youth Chorus and the Choir of St. Jean Baptiste
The Dope on the Pope. Jim Gaffigan, Maria Shriver, Andrew Sullivan and Archbishop Thomas Wenski discuss Pope Francis's visit to America and Catholicism. YMCA Jerusalem Youth Chorus and the Choir of St. Jean Baptiste perform a rendition of the Hoyt Axton/Three Dog Night song "Joy to the World".
14	September 25, 2015	Malala Yousafzai, Kerry Washington	The Arcs
Stephen Colbert's All-Inclusive Wedding Cake Toppers. Malala Yousafzai discusses the right to education for women and her new documentary, He Named Me Malala; she also performs a magic trick for Stephen. Kerry Washington discusses Scandal and the Global Citizen Festival. The Arcs performed "Outta My Mind" from their album Yours, Dreamily,.
15	September 28, 2015	First Lady Michelle Obama, John Legend	John Legend
First Lady Michelle Obama discusses the "Let Girls Learn" initiative, her life and recent politics. Stephen Colbert's Who Am Me? (Stephen takes the MBTI). John Legend discusses the "FreeAmerica" initiative and performs a duet of "America the Beautiful" with Stephen.
16	September 29, 2015	Elliot Page, Jesse Eisenberg	Dominic Wilcox
Elliot Page discusses Freeheld and LGBT progress. Jesse Eisenberg discusses his new collection of short stories, Bream Gives Me Hiccups: And Other Stories. Stephen Colbert Gets All Up in Your Faith. Stephen demonstrates Dominic Wilcox's inventions.
17	September 30, 2015	John Oliver, Evan Spiegel, Bill Withers & Ed Sheeran	Ed Sheeran
Big Questions with Even Bigger Stars (with Tom Hanks). John Oliver discusses Last Week Tonight. Evan Spiegel discusses Snapchat. Bill Withers and Ed Sheeran discuss Withers' induction to the Rock and Roll Hall of Fame, as Sheeran performs "Ain't No Sunshine".

=== October ===
No.	Original release date	Guest(s)	Musical/entertainment guest(s)
18	October 1, 2015	Secretary of State John Kerry, Claire Danes, PewDiePie	N/A
John Kerry discusses the Iran nuclear deal. Claire Danes discusses Homeland. PewDiePie discusses his YouTube channel and his new book, This Book Loves You.
19	October 2, 2015	Morgan Freeman, Ruth Wilson	Sean Murray
Stephen Colbert's Cyborgasm. Morgan Freeman discusses Madam Secretary. Ruth Wilson discusses The Affair. Sean Murray demonstrates No Man's Sky.
20	October 5, 2015	Senator John McCain, Misty Copeland	Yo-Yo Ma
Yo-Yo Ma sits in with the band and provides musical accompaniment. Whole Foods Apologies. Senator John McCain discusses recent politics. Stephen Colbert's Who Am Me? (Stephen takes a polygraph test). Misty Copeland discusses her new documentary, A Ballerina's Tale. Copeland also performs the courante from Johann Sebastian Bach's "Cello Suite No. 2" with Ma. The Late Show celebrates Ma's 60th birthday.
21	October 6, 2015	Bill Clinton, Billy Eichner	Florence and the Machine
Stephen Colbert's Pander Express. Bill Clinton discusses the Clinton Foundation, its projects, and the 2016 election. Billy Eichner discusses Billy on the Street. Florence and the Machine performs "What Kind of Man" from their album How Big, How Blue, How Beautiful.
22	October 7, 2015	Gina Rodriguez, Ben Bernanke	Tame Impala
The Big Furry Hat. Gina Rodriguez discusses Jane the Virgin. Stephen Colbert's Esophagorge. Ben Bernanke discusses the 2008 financial crisis and his new book, The Courage to Act. Tame Impala performs "The Less I Know the Better" from their album Currents.
23	October 8, 2015	Cate Blanchett, Brian Chesky	Dartmouth University Football Dummy
Stephen Colbert's Digital Doo. Cate Blanchett discusses Truth. Brian Chesky discusses Airbnb. Buddy Teevens and Elliot Kastner of the Dartmouth Big Green demonstrate their Tackle Dummy.
24	October 9, 2015	James Corden, Shane Smith	Halsey
Life Hacked. James Corden discusses The Late Late Show and his appointment as Officer of the Order of the British Empire. Corden performs "Me and My Shadow" with Stephen. Shane Smith discusses VICE Media. Halsey performs "New Americana" from her album Badlands.
25	October 12, 2015	Carey Mulligan, Elvis Costello	Darlene Love
Stephen Colbert's RejecTED Talks. Carey Mulligan discusses Suffragette and the British women's suffrage movement. Stephen takes a meeting with her producer. Elvis Costello discusses his new memoir, Unfaithful Music & Disappearing Ink, and his father's influence. Darlene Love performs "Forbidden Nights", from her album Introducing Darlene Love, with Costello.
26	October 13, 2015	Sarah Silverman, Elijah Wood	The Legend of Zelda: Symphony of the Goddesses
Stephen Colbert's Hot Takes. Sarah Silverman discusses I Smile Back and reads bad jokes written by kids with Stephen. Elijah Wood talks The Lord of the Rings with Stephen and discusses The Last Witch Hunter. Orchestral performance by The Legend of Zelda: Symphony of the Goddesses.
27	October 14, 2015	Jack Black, Nick Woodman	Michelle Dorrance
Jack Black discusses his years with Tenacious D and Goosebumps. Black performs "My Kind of America" with Stephen. Nick Woodman discusses GoPro. Michelle Dorrance discusses her career and performs a tap dance, with Jon Batiste and Stay Human providing accompaniment.
28	October 15, 2015	Oprah Winfrey, Joseph Fink & Jeffrey Cranor	Judith Hill
Oprah Winfrey discusses spirituality with Stephen and OWN (Oprah Winfrey Network). Stephen's pre-show rituals. Judith Hill performs "Cry, Cry, Cry" from her album Back in Time. Joseph Fink & Jeffrey Cranor discuss Welcome to Night Vale.
29	October 16, 2015	Jimmy Kimmel, Guillermo del Toro, Jessica Chastain, Tom Hiddleston, Mia Wasikowska	Beach House
Jimmy Kimmel discusses Jimmy Kimmel Live! and his agent, same as Stephen's, before having a cook-off. Guillermo Del Toro, Jessica Chastain, Tom Hiddleston and Mia Wasikowska discuss Crimson Peak. Beach House performs "One Thing" from their album Thank Your Lucky Stars.
30	October 26, 2015	Sienna Miller, Melissa Benoist	Chance the Rapper
The Hungry for Power Games (Jim Webb and Lincoln Chafee), with a cameo appearance by Stanley Tucci. Miller discusses Burnt. Benoist discusses Supergirl. Chance the Rapper performs "Angels" from his mixtape Coloring Book.
31	October 27, 2015	Hillary Clinton, Anthony Bourdain, Carrie Brownstein	N/A
Lianne La Havas sits in with the band and provides musical accompaniment. Hillary Clinton discusses her presidential campaign. Anthony Bourdain discusses Anthony Bourdain: Parts Unknown and his new graphic novel, Get Jiro. Carrie Brownstein discusses her new memoir, Hunger Makes Me a Modern Girl.
32	October 28, 2015	Julianna Margulies, Jonathan Franzen	Alabama Shakes
Julianna Margulies discusses The Good Wife. Jonathan Franzen discusses Purity. Alabama Shakes performs "Joe" from their album Sound & Color. Franzen reads Stephen a bedtime story as the episode's outro.
33	October 29, 2015	Seth MacFarlane, Neil deGrasse Tyson	Seth MacFarlane
Seth MacFarlane discusses his new album, No One Ever Tells You. Focus on the Universe. Neil deGrasse Tyson discusses StarTalk and the latest scientific discoveries. MacFarlane performs "The One I Love (Belongs to Somebody Else)".
34	October 30, 2015	Charlie Rose, Stacy Schiff	Ghost
The Late Show celebrates Halloween. The Zombies sit in with the band and provide musical accompaniment. Cameo appearance by Rob Gronkowski. Charlie Rose comes out as Frankenstein and discusses Charlie Rose. Late Show Pumpking Carving Tips. Stacy Schiff comes out as a cat lady and discusses her new book, The Witches: Salem, 1692. Heavy metal band Ghost performs "Cirice" from their album Meliora, making their first appearance on an American TV show.

=== November ===
No.	Original release date	Guest(s)	Musical/entertainment guest(s)
35	November 2, 2015	Allison Janney, Colin Quinn	Margaret Cho
Allison Janney discusses Mom. Colin Quinn discusses Colin Quinn: The New York Story. Margaret Cho discusses her new special, Psycho, and performs "Lice" from her album Cho Dependent.
36	November 3, 2015	Antonio Banderas, Reed Hastings, John Irving	N/A
Stephen Colbert Gazes into the Infinet. Antonio Banderas discusses The 33. Reed Hastings discusses Netflix. John Irving discusses his works and his new book, Avenue of Mysteries, and reads Stephen a bedtime story as the episode's outro.
37	November 4, 2015	Daniel Craig, Elizabeth Gilbert, Dr. Eugenia Cheng	N/A
The Hungry for Power Games (Lawrence Lessig). Daniel Craig discusses Spectre. Craig rents a new car. Elizabeth Gilbert discusses the creative process and her new book, Big Magic: Creative Living Beyond Fear. Dr. Eugenia Cheng discusses baking and mathematics.
38	November 5, 2015	Bryan Cranston	Shamir
Stephen Colbert's Hot Takes. Bryan Cranston discusses Trumbo. Big Questions with Even Bigger Stars (with Bryan Cranston). Jon Batiste and Stephen visit New Orleans. Shamir performs "On the Regular" from his album Ratchet.
39	November 6, 2015	Whoopi Goldberg, Governor John Kasich	Glen Hansard
Harry Potter and the Cauldron of Spoilers. Stephen Colbert's RejecTED Talks. Whoopi Goldberg discusses The View and her new book, If Someone Says "You Complete Me", RUN!. Governor John Kasich discusses his presidential campaign. Glen Hansard performs "Lowly Deserter" from his album Didn't He Ramble.
40	November 9, 2015	Ethan Hawke, Senator Claire McCaskill & Senator Amy Klobuchar	Nathaniel Rateliff & The Night Sweats
Stacie Orrico sits in with the band and provides musical accompaniment. Cameo appearance by Rainn Wilson. Ethan Hawke discusses the New York City Marathon and his new book, Rules for a Knight. Stephen Colbert's Midnight Confessions. Senators Claire McCaskill and Amy Klobuchar discuss women in the United States Senate and their books, Plenty Ladylike and The Senator Next Door. Nathaniel Rateliff & The Night Sweats perform "I Need Never Get Old" from their eponymous album.
41	November 10, 2015	Aziz Ansari, Shonda Rhimes, Bruce Campbell & Lucy Lawless	N/A
Candy Crush Saga "movie clip" with Liam Neeson. Aziz Ansari discusses Master of None, with an appearance from his father. Shonda Rhimes discusses her new book, Year of Yes. Bruce Campbell and Lucy Lawless discuss Ash vs. Evil Dead.
42	November 11, 2015	Viola Davis, Brian Greene	George Ezra
Viola Davis discusses How to Get Away with Murder. Darlene Love and Stephen wishes Jon Batiste a happy birthday. Brian Greene discusses physics. George Ezra performs "Blame It on Me" from his album Wanted on Voyage.
43	November 12, 2015	Jennifer Connelly, Judd Apatow	The Internet
An appearance from John Dickerson. Jennifer Connelly discusses Shelter. Judd Apatow discusses his comeback to standup comedy and his new book, Sick in the Head. The Internet performs "Under Control" from their album Ego Death.
44	November 13, 2015	Mark Ruffalo, John Cleese	Michael Flatley
Mark Ruffalo discusses Spotlight. The Big Furry Hat (with John Cleese). John Cleese discusses his career in comedy and his new book, So, Anyway... Michael Flatley discusses Lord of the Dance: Dangerous Games, followed by a tap dance performance. Stephen acknowledges the terrorists attacks in France in the episode's outro.
45	November 16, 2015	Jack H. Jacobs, Bill Maher, Florent Groberg, Shepard Fairey	The Acro-Cats
Medal of Honor recipient Jack H. Jacobs discusses the terrorists attacks in France. Bill Maher discusses religion and the presidential election. Medal of Honor recipient Florent Groberg discusses the War in Afghanistan. Shepard Fairey discusses his art and his new book, Covert to Overt. A performance by The Acro-Cats.
46	November 17, 2015	Julianne Moore, Burt Reynolds	Public Image Ltd
CeeLo Green sits in with the band and provides musical accompaniment. Julianne Moore discusses The Hunger Games: Mockingjay – Part 2 and her new book, Freckleface Strawberry. Burt Reynolds discusses his acting career and his new book, But Enough About Me. Public Image Ltd performs "Double Trouble" from their album What the World Needs Now....
47	November 18, 2015	Sharon Stone, Justin Theroux	James Taylor
The Hungry for Power Games (Bobby Jindal). Sharon Stone discusses Agent X. Justin Theroux discusses The Leftovers and has an eyebrow acting contest with Stephen. James Taylor performs "Montana" from his album Before This World, an updated version of "Fire and Rain" with Stephen and a folk rendition of "La Marseillaise".
48	November 19, 2015	Jane Fonda, Andrew Lloyd Webber	N/A
12-year-old Brandon Niederauer sits in with the band and provides musical accompaniment. Jane Fonda discusses Youth, Grace and Frankie and her career. Andrew Lloyd Webber discusses the musical and performs excerpts from his works with Stephen and Jon Batiste.
49	November 20, 2015	Michael Caine, Larry Wilmore	Boots
Vulfpeck sits in with the band and provides musical accompaniment. Michael Caine discusses Youth and his career. Larry Wilmore discusses The Nightly Show and his new book, I'd Rather We Got Casinos. Boots performs "C.U.R.E." from his album AQUΛRIA.
50	November 23, 2015	Sylvester Stallone, Ted Koppel	My Morning Jacket
An appearance from 2015 NASCAR Sprint Cup Series champion Kyle Busch. The Late Show Presents: Thanksgiving Turkey Tips with Our Friends at Butterball. Sylvester Stallone discusses Creed and Rocky. Ted Koppel discusses his new book, Lights Out. My Morning Jacket performs "Tropics" from their album The Waterfall.
51	November 24, 2015	Spike Lee, Andy Cohen, Carly Simon	Carly Simon
Spike Lee discusses Chi-Raq. Andy Cohen discusses Then and Now and his new book, The Andy Cohen Diaries. Carly Simon discusses her new memoir, Boys in the Trees and performs "Mockingbird" with Stephen. Simon also performs "I Can't Thank You Enough" from her greatest hits album Songs from the Trees.
52	November 25, 2015	Gloria Estefan, Eric Greitens & Jake Wood, Daniel Boulud	N/A
The Late Show celebrates Thanksgiving. Gloria Estefan discusses On Your Feet! and her Cuban heritage. Stephen says goodbye to Zobo, the Late Show Joke-Testing Ape. Eric Greitens and Jake Wood discuss The Mission Continues and Team Rubicon. Daniel Boulud presents his new book, Daniel: My French Cuisine, and prepares turkeys with Stephen.

=== December ===
No.	Original release date	Guest(s)	Musical/entertainment guest(s)
53	December 7, 2015	Steve Carell, Jennifer Hudson	Jennifer Hudson & the cast of The Color Purple
Victoria's Secret Angels Adriana Lima, Behati Prinsloo and Taylor Hill eat buffalo wings. Steve Carell discusses The Big Short and sings "Dance With Me" with Stephen. Jennifer Hudson discusses The Color Purple. Morgan Freeman's announcer audition. Hudson and the cast of The Color Purple perform "Push Da Button".
54	December 8, 2015	Marion Cotillard, George Saunders	Joanna Newsom
Stephen's J. R. R. Tolkien geekdom pays off. Marion Cotillard discusses Macbeth. Things That Sound Way More Intriguing When Said in French (with Marion Cotillard). George Saunders discusses his new book, The Very Persistent Gappers of Frip and sings Today Is A Beautiful Day, But Not For You. Joanna Newsom performs "Leaving the City" from her album Divers. Saunders reads Stephen a bedtime story as the episode's outro.
55	December 9, 2015	Michelle Dockery, Hugh Bonneville, Allen Leech, Adam McKay	Kurt Vile
Michelle Dockery, Alan Bonneville and Allen Leech discuss Downton Abbey and perform a scene with Stephen. Stephen changes a lightbulb outside the Ed Sullivan Theater. Adam McKay discusses The Big Short. Kurt Vile performs "Pretty Pimpin" from his album B'lieve I'm Goin Down...
56	December 10, 2015	Bruce Willis, Michael Lewis, Andrew Delbanco	Lizzo
Jon Stewart makes an appearance to discuss the Zadroga Act. Stephen Colbert's Midnight Confessions. Bruce Willis discusses Misery. Stephen doesn't believe Willis does his own stunts and a fight ensues. Michael Lewis discusses The Big Short. Andrew Delbanco and Stephen ride a rollercoaster and discuss Moby-Dick. Lizzo performs "Ain't I" from her album Big Grrrl Small World.
57	December 11, 2015	Lin-Manuel Miranda, Ike Barinholtz	Sharon Jones & The Dap-Kings
Lin-Manuel Miranda discusses Hamilton, New York and his influences. Miranda and Stephen present "Button! The American Musical". Ike Barinholtz discusses Sisters. Sharon Jones & The Dap-Kings perform "8 Days (of Hanukkah)" from their album It's a Holiday Soul Party.
58	December 14, 2015	Jennifer Lawrence, Doris Kearns Goodwin	Sleater-Kinney
Stephen says goodbye to oil. Jennifer Lawrence discusses Joy and being human. Big Questions with Even Bigger Stars (with Jennifer Lawrence). Doris Kearns Goodwin discusses the presidential election. The Late Show Presents: Quotable Notables' Quotables. Sleater-Kinney performs "Bury Our Friends" from their album No Cities to Love.
59	December 15, 2015	Quentin Tarantino, Jonathan Groff	Squeeze
Stephen auditions as Han Solo (appearances by Harrison Ford and J. J. Abrams). Quentin Tarantino discusses The Hateful Eight and his career. The Big Furry Hat. Jonathan Groff discusses Hamilton and teaches Stephen his King George III walk. Squeeze performs "Happy Days" from their album Cradle to the Grave, with Jon Batiste & Stay Human providing musical accompaniment.
60	December 16, 2015	Robert De Niro, Daniel Gilbert, Henry Rollins	Henry Rollins
Hashtag: #SpoilerSpoilers. Robert De Niro discusses Joy and his career. De Niro also enjoys a cold martini (and silence) with Stephen. Daniel Gilbert discusses his new book, Stumbling on Happiness. Henry Rollins discusses He Never Died and performs A Very Rollins Christmas with Stephen.
61	December 17, 2015	Michael Moore, Samantha Power	Michael C. Hall & the cast of Lazarus
Crunchy the Squirrel presents Oatie-O's. Michael Moore discusses Where to Invade Next and takes a more positive look at the world. Samantha Power discusses her position as Ambassador to the United Nations. Michael C. Hall discusses Lazarus. The Late Show Holiday Gift Guide. Hall and the cast of Lazarus perform the title track of the play.
62	December 18, 2015	Mandy Patinkin, Kayvon Beykpour	Leon Bridges
The Late Show celebrates Christmas. Mandy Patinkin discusses Homeland and has some thoughts on the world, fear and humanity. Christmas Party Apologies. Kayvon Beykpour discusses Periscope. Leon Bridges performs Sam Cooke's "Jesus Gave Me Water".
