= Dodge and burn =

Dodge and burn may refer to:

- Dodging and burning
- Dodge & Burn, a 2015 album by The Dead Weather
