= I Cut Like a Buffalo =

Single by The Dead Weather

from the album Horehound
- B-side: "A Child Of A Few Hours Is Burning To Death"
- Released: October 26, 2009
- Recorded: January 2009 at Third Man Studio
- Genre: Alternative rock, garage rock, psychedelic rock, gothic rock, reggae fusion
- Length: 3:28
- Label: Third Man
- Songwriter(s): Jack White
- Producer(s): Jack White

The Dead Weather singles chronology
"Treat Me Like Your Mother" (2009)	"I Cut Like a Buffalo" (2009)	"Die by the Drop" (2010)

"I Cut Like a Buffalo" is the third track from the album Horehound, by the alternative rock group The Dead Weather in 2009. It was also released as the third single from the album (after "Hang You from the Heavens" and "Treat Me Like Your Mother"). Jack White is the sole writer of this song.

It has been remixed (but not released commercially) by popular dubstep producer Skream. It has also been remixed by Gramatik, who falls under various genres.

The B side "A Child of a Few Hours Is Burning to Death" is a cover originally done by 60's garage-psych band The West Coast Pop Art Experimental Band.

== Videos ==
The single has two music videos, both of which were directed by Jack White. The first video was not allowed to be shown in the UK because it contains images of people choking and dancers holding knives in a threatening manner. White was forced to release the second video, which he originally intended to be a secret video for his own use, to replace the original and be shown in the United Kingdom. The second video is a second shorter than the first. For a few months however, the video did receive moderate airplay on Australian video show Rage. Olivia Jean, Shelby Lynne and Ruby Rogers from The Black Belles appear in this video.

== Track listing ==
=== 7 inch ===
The following tracks appear on the 7 inch version of the single.

No.	Title	Length
1.	"I Cut Like a Buffalo"	3:27
2.	"A Child of a Few Hours Is Burning to Death"	4:59
Total length:		8:26

=== Nokia Music exclusive ===
No.	Title	Length
1.	"I Cut Like a Buffalo"
2.	"A Child of a Few Hours Is Burning to Death"
3.	"Bone House (Live from the Basement)"
4.	"Hang You from the Heavens (Live from the Basement)"

== Personnel ==
- Alison Mosshart – guitar, vocals
- Dean Fertita – organ, guitar
- Jack Lawrence – bass
- Jack White – drums, vocals, production
