= List of The Late Show with Stephen Colbert episodes (2016) =

- No. of episodes: 203 (and 1 special)

Release
- Original network: CBS
- Original release: January 4 – December 16, 2016

Season chronology
- ← Previous; 2015 episodes Next → 2017 episodes

This is the list of episodes of The Late Show with Stephen Colbert that aired in 2016.

== 2016 ==
=== January ===
No.	Original release date	Guest(s)	Musical/entertainment guest(s)
63	January 4, 2016	Samuel L. Jackson, Lisa Gross, Olivia Hallisey	N/A
New Year's Resolutions. Samuel L. Jackson discusses The Hateful Eight. Lisa Gross discusses the League of Kitchens and Stephen joins. Olivia Hallisey demonstrates her invention.
64	January 5, 2016	John Krasinski, Killer Mike, George Church	Foals
John Krasinski discusses 13 Hours: The Secret Soldiers of Benghazi, in addition to having a vomit-off with Stephen. Killer Mike discusses social activism. George Church discusses genetic engineering. Foals performs "Mountain at My Gates" from their album What Went Down.
65	January 6, 2016	Jerry Seinfeld, Senator Rand Paul	Andra Day
Jerry Seinfeld gives a stand-up performance and discusses his career and Comedians in Cars Getting Coffee. Senator Rand Paul discusses his presidential campaign. Andra Day performs "Rise Up" from her album Cheers to the Fall.
66	January 7, 2016	Damian Lewis, America Ferrera	The Floyd-Little Double Dutch Team
Stephen is upset about his BLT lacking tomatoes and goes to Rupert Jee to complain (Jee's first appearance on the Late Show following David Letterman's retirement). Damian Lewis discusses Billions. The Hungry for Power Games (George Pataki and Lindsey Graham). America Ferrera discusses Superstore. The Floyd-Little Double Dutch Team gave a performance.
67	January 8, 2016	Matthew Broderick, Sarah Parcak	Kacey Musgraves
First live episode. Stephen Colbert's Midnight Confessions. Matthew Broderick discusses his private life and his career, in addition to performing a duet of "Wouldn't It Be Loverly" with Stephen. Sarah Parcak discusses space archaeology. Quentin Tarantino's announcer audition. Kacey Musgraves performs "Late to the Party" from her album Pageant Material.
68	January 11, 2016	Jane Lynch, Julian Castro	EL VY
Stephen's El Chapo audition. Jane Lynch discusses Angel from Hell. Julian Castro discusses his position as Secretary of Housing and Urban Development. EL VY performs "Return to the Moon" from their album of the same name and close the show by performing "Let's Dance" in tribute to David Bowie.
69	January 12, 2016	Saoirse Ronan, Jeremy Stoppelman, Laura Ricciardi & Moira Demos	James Bay
Saoirse Ronan discusses Brooklyn and accents. Late Show Powerball Tips. Jeremy Stoppelman discusses Yelp. Laura Ricciardi & Moira Demos discuss Making a Murderer. James Bay performs "Let It Go" from his album Chaos and the Calm.
70	January 13, 2016	Paul Giamatti, Guerrilla Girls	J.B. Mauney
Paul Giamatti discusses Billions. The Big Furry Hat. The Guerrilla Girls discuss feminism in the art world. J.B. Mauney gives a bull-riding performance.
71	January 14, 2016	Olivia Munn, T. J. Miller	Father John Misty
Oscar Best Picture Nominees. Munn discusses Ride Along 2. Piano One-O-Fun with Jon Batiste. T.J. Miller discusses the Critics' Choice Awards and plays skeleton hands with Stephen. Father John Misty performs "Holy ****" from his album I Love You, Honeybear.
72	January 15, 2016	Scott Kelly, Abby Wambach	Maria Bamford
Friday Night Fights featuring Paul Dinello. Scott Kelly discusses life in space. Abby Wambach discusses soccer in America in addition to having a kick-off with Stephen. Maria Bamford gives a stand-up performance and discusses her career.
73	January 18, 2016	Patricia Heaton, Quincy Jones, DeRay Mckesson	Grace
Patricia Heaton discusses The Middle and Catholicism. Quincy Jones discusses his career and his new line of headphones. DeRay Mckesson discusses activism and race issues. Grace performs "You Don't Own Me" from her EP Memo, with Jon Batiste & Stay Human providing musical accompaniment.
74	January 19, 2016	Charlie Day, Colin Hanks	Margo Price
Late Show Secret Netflix Codes. Charlie Day discusses It's Always Sunny in Philadelphia. The Road to the SuperShow. Colin Hanks discusses Life in Pieces. Margo Price performs "Hurtin' (On the Bottle)" from her album Midwest Farmer's Daughter.
75	January 20, 2016	James Spader, Brandon Marshall, Sarah Koenig	Rev. Run
James Spader discusses The Blacklist and his eccentricity. Brandon Marshall discusses the NFL postseason and his illness. Sarah Koenig discusses Serial. A kebab lesson with Rev. Run.
76	January 21, 2016	Christian Slater, Josh Radnor	Iggy Pop & Josh Homme
Stephen Colbert's Hot Takes. Christian Slater discusses Mr. Robot. Josh Radnor discusses Mercy Street. Iggy Pop & Josh Homme discuss their careers and perform "Gardenia" from their album Post Pop Depression.
77	January 22, 2016	Steven Tyler, Gaby Hoffmann	Låpsley
Stephen's storm tips. Friday Night Fights featuring Neil deGrasse Tyson, who also discusses Planet Nine. Steven Tyler discusses rock music and his new country album We're All Somebody from Somewhere, in addition to showing Stephen some stage moves. Gaby Hoffmann discusses Transparent. Låpsley performs "Falling Short" from her album Long Way Home.
78	January 25, 2016	Donald Rumsfeld, Russell Westbrook	Jackson Browne
The Road to the SuperShow. Donald Rumsfeld discusses his app and his political career. Russell Westbrook discusses his game and his fashion. Jackson Browne performs "The Long Way Around" from his album Standing in the Breach.
79	January 26, 2016	Laurence Fishburne, Michael Novacek	Lake Street Dive
Stephen answers questions from his audience. Laurence Fishburne discusses Black-ish. Laurence's Fish Burns. Life Hacked. Michael Novacek discusses the titanosaur. Lake Street Dive performs "Call Off Your Dogs" from their album Side Pony.
80	January 27, 2016	Chris Pine, Danielle Brooks, Jonah Reider	Baauer
Bernie Sanders Promposals. Chris Pine discusses The Finest Hours. Danielle Brooks discusses The Color Purple. Jonah Reider discusses his restaurant. Baauer performs "Day Ones" from his album Aa, featuring Leikeli47.
81	January 28, 2016	Josh Brolin, John Dickerson, Erin Brockovich	Aubrie Sellers
Josh Brolin discusses Hail, Caesar!. John Dickerson discusses Face the Nation. Erin Brockovich discusses the water crisis in Flint, Michigan. Aubrie Sellers performs "Light of Day" from her album New City Blues.

=== February ===
No.	Original release date	Guest(s)	Musical/entertainment guest(s)
82	February 1, 2016	John Travolta, Courtney B. Vance, Amy Cuddy	John Moreland
The CBS Vault: The Twilight Zone – Just the Twists. John Travolta and Courtney B. Vance discuss The People v. O. J. Simpson: American Crime Story. Big Questions with Even Bigger Stars (with Kermit the Frog). Amy Cuddy discusses her new book, Presence, and body language. John Moreland performs "Break My Heart Sweetly" from his album High on Tulsa Heat.
83	February 2, 2016	David Schwimmer, Joel Osteen	M. Ward
David Schwimmer discusses The People v. O. J. Simpson: American Crime Story and his friendship with Stephen. Stephen presents new items from his own lifestyle brand, Covetton House. Joel Osteen discusses his new book, The Power of I Am, and Christianity. M. Ward performs "Confession" from his album More Rain.
84	February 3, 2016	Dr. Phil, Mark & Jay Duplass, Michael Eric Dyson	Anderson .Paak and The Free Nationals
The Hungry for Power Games (Rand Paul, Martin O'Malley and Mike Huckabee). Dr. Phil discusses his series and responds questions from Twitter. Mark & Jay Duplass discuss Togetherness. Michael Eric Dyson discusses his new book, The Black Presidency, and the presidential race. Anderson .Paak and The Free Nationals give a performance from Paak's album Malibu.
85	February 4, 2016	Michael Strahan, Samantha Bee	Wilco
Stephen asks NFL players at Media Day: What do you do to get Pumped Up for the Big Show?. Strahan discusses Good Morning America, Super Bowl 50 and his clothing line. Stephen Colbert's Midnight Confessions. Samantha Bee discusses Full Frontal. Wilco performs "Random Name Generator" from their album Star Wars. Wilco frontman Jeff Tweedy sings Stephen a lullaby as the episode's outro.
86	February 5, 2016	Bobby Cannavale, Donny Deutsch	Charles Kelley
Friday Night Fights featuring Neil deGrasse Tyson and Arianna Huffington. Bobby Cannavale discusses Vinyl. The Late Show Presents: Just The Dips! Donny Deutsch discusses his advertising career. Charles Kelley performs the title track of his album The Driver.
Special	February 7, 2016	Tina Fey & Margot Robbie, Will Ferrell, Megyn Kelly	Keegan-Michael Key & Jordan Peele
Special live episode airing after Super Bowl 50. Special appearances from Scott Kelly and Barack & Michelle Obama. Tina Fey & Margot Robbie discuss Whiskey Tango Foxtrot. On-air interview with Jim Nantz and Super Bowl MVP Von Miller. Will Ferrell discusses Zoolander 2 and "rare animals". A football-based sketch with Keegan-Michael Key and Jordan Peele. Megyn Kelly discusses the presidential race and her feud with Donald Trump.
87	February 8, 2016	Bill O'Reilly, Eddie George	Macklemore & Ryan Lewis
A new football-based sketch with Keegan-Michael Key and Jordan Peele. Bill O'Reilly discusses the presidential race and his new book, Killing Reagan. Eddie George discusses Chicago. Macklemore & Ryan Lewis perform "White Privilege II" from their album This Unruly Mess I've Made, featuring Jamila Woods.
88	February 9, 2016	Olivia Wilde, Christiane Amanpour	Jon Batiste
Kermit Ruffins sits in with the band and provides musical accompaniment. Olivia Wilde discusses Vinyl. Christiane Amanpour discusses her show in CNN and her career in journalism. Jon Batiste and Stephen talk to Batiste's high school jazz piano instructor at NOCCA. Batiste also performs a special rendition of "Blackbird".
89	February 10, 2016	Ben Stiller, Senator Bernie Sanders	Drum Tao
"Bernie Sandwiches". Ben Stiller discusses Zoolander 2. Bernie Sanders discusses his presidential campaign. A performance by Drum Tao.
90	February 11, 2016	Kelsey Grammer, Fred Armisen, Sarah McDaniel	Ty Segall and The Muggers
Late Show First Drafts: Valentine's Day Cards. Kelsey Grammer discusses Finding Neverland. Fred Armisen discusses Portlandia and reviews Foghat wine with Stephen. Sarah McDaniel discusses her cover role on the first non-nude issue of Playboy. Ty Segall and The Muggers perform "Candy Sam" from their album Emotional Mugger.
91	February 15, 2016	Craig Ferguson, Hailey Clauson & Ashley Graham, Cory Booker	Scott Waites
The Big Furry Hat. Craig Ferguson discusses his American identity and Join or Die. Hailey Clauson & Ashley Graham discuss their cover roles on the latest Sports Illustrated Swimsuit Issue and teach Stephen how to properly pose. Cory Booker discusses his new book, United. Scot Waites plays darts with Stephen and Ferguson.
92	February 16, 2016	Eva Longoria, Abbi Jacobson & Ilana Glazer	Lucinda Williams
Donald Trump phones in from South Carolina. Eva Longoria discusses Telenovela and acts out a "telenovela" presidential debate with Stephen. Abbi Jacobson & Ilana Glazer discuss Broad City and take Stephen to the "Happy Bagel Place". Lucinda Williams performs "Dust" from her album The Ghosts of Highway 20.
93	February 17, 2016	Kate Hudson, Governor John Kasich	Courtney Barnett
The Late Show Dog Show. The Hungry for Power Games (Rick Santorum, Chris Christie, Carly Fiorina and Jim Gilmore). Kate Hudson discusses her new book, Pretty Happy, and plays "Did You Mean" with Stephen. John Kasich discusses his presidential campaign. Courtney Barnett performs "Nobody Really Cares If You Don't Go to the Party" from her album Sometimes I Sit and Think, and Sometimes I Just Sit.
94	February 18, 2016	Téa Leoni, Amanda Peet, Triumph the Insult Comic Dog	N/A
Wheel of News. Téa Leoni discusses Madam Secretary. Amanda Peet discusses Togetherness. Triumph the Insult Comic Dog discusses Triumph's Election Special and the presidential race.
95	February 19, 2016	Chelsea Handler, Zosia Mamet	The Lumineers
Friday Night Fights featuring John Hodgman. Chelsea Handler discusses Chelsea Does. The Road to the White House. Zosia Mamet discusses Girls. The Lumineers perform "Ophelia" from their album Cleopatra.
96	February 22, 2016	Casey Affleck, Richard Dreyfuss	Mavis Staples
The Road to the White House. The Hungry for Power Games (Jeb Bush). Casey Affleck discusses Triple 9. Richard Dreyfuss discusses Madoff and the Dreyfuss Initiative. Mavis Staples discusses her new documentary, Mavis!, and performs "Take Us Back" from her album Livin' on a High Note.
97	February 23, 2016	Debra Messing, Zachary Quinto	Violent Femmes
The Road to the White House. Stephen Colbert's Midnight Confessions. Debra Messing discusses The Mysteries of Laura and her acting career. Zachary Quinto discusses Smokefall. Violent Femmes perform "Memory" from their album We Can Do Anything.
98	February 24, 2016	Adrien Brody, Danai Gurira, Brian Greene	N/A
The Road to the White House. Adrien Brody discusses Backtrack and art. Danai Gurira discusses The Walking Dead, Familiar and Eclipsed. Brian Greene discusses the first observation of gravitational waves.
99	February 25, 2016	Tim Daly, Graham Nash	Jason Isbell
Wheel of News. Tim Daly discusses Madam Secretary. The CBS Vault: CBS Sports. Graham Nash discusses his new album, This Path Tonight, and sings "Just a Song Before I Go". Jason Isbell performs "If It Takes a Lifetime" from his album Something More Than Free.
100	February 29, 2016	Spike Jonze, Jeffrey Dean Morgan	Jack Garratt
A new intro by Spike Jonze. The Road to the White House. Puppy Oscars. Jonze discusses Viceland. Jeffrey Dean Morgan discusses The Good Wife and his personal pursuits. Facebook Design Labs presents "Facebook Alpha". Jack Garratt performs "Worry" from his album Phase.

=== March ===
No.	Original release date	Guest(s)	Musical/entertainment guest(s)
101	March 1, 2016	Chrissy Teigen, Mike Birbiglia, Adam Savage	N/A
A few musical numbers from Fiddler on the Roof. The Road to the White House. Chrissy Teigen discusses her new book, Cravings, and demonstrates one of her recipes. Mike Birbiglia discusses Thank God for Jokes. Adam Savage discusses MythBusters and busts a myth with Stephen.
102	March 2, 2016	Octavia Spencer, John Stamos, Bob Saget, Dave Coulier	Lucius
The Road to the White House. Octavia Spencer discusses The Divergent Series: Allegiant and her career. John Stamos, Bob Saget and Dave Coulier discuss Fuller House, plus Full House Nights, featuring Stephen. Lucius performs "Born Again Teen" from their album Good Grief.
103	March 3, 2016	Christopher Meloni, Edward Byers	Ray LaMontagne
The Road to the White House. Christopher Meloni discusses Underground and his personal pursuits. Piano One-O-Fun (Fashion Tips) with Jon Batiste. Edward Byers discusses his Medal of Honor action. Ray LaMontagne performs "Hey, No Pressure" from his album Ouroboros.
104	March 7, 2016	Will Arnett, Charles Barkley, Max Greenfield	N/A
Will Arnett discusses Flaked. Late Show Blanket Fort with Will Arnett. Charles Barkley discusses golf and March Madness. Max Greenfield discusses Hello, My Name Is Doris.
105	March 8, 2016	Helen Mirren, J. J. Abrams	DMA's
The Hungry for Power Games (Ben Carson). Helen Mirren discusses Eye in the Sky. J. J. Abrams discusses 10 Cloverfield Lane. DMA's performs "Delete" from their album Hills End.
106	March 9, 2016	Sally Field, Jerrod Carmichael	Esperanza Spalding
Sally Field discusses Hello, My Name Is Doris and her career. Jerrod Carmichael discusses The Carmichael Show. Esperanza Spalding performs "Good Lava" from her album Emily's D+Evolution.
107	March 10, 2016	Anna Kendrick, U.S. Attorney General Loretta Lynch	Brian Fallon
Wheel of News. Anna Kendrick discusses her career, in addition to performing "They Say It's Wonderful" with Stephen. Kendrick also discusses DonorsChoose, with appearances from Charles Best, Yvette Nicole Brown, Jack Dorsey, Tim Ferriss, Craig Newmark, John King, Jr., Torrey Smith, Russell Simmons and Dwight Howard. Attorney General Loretta Lynch discusses the current state of law in the United States. Brian Fallon performs "A Wonderful Life" from his album Painkillers.
108	March 11, 2016	Jeff Daniels, Audra McDonald, Mary Elizabeth Winstead	N/A
An appearance from Bill Murray. Friday Night Fights featuring Paul F. Tompkins. Jeff Daniels discusses The Divergent Series: Allegiant and Blackbird. Community Calendar: Chelsea, Michigan with Jeff Daniels. Audra McDonald discusses Lady Day at Emerson's Bar and Grill and Shuffle Along. Mary Elizabeth Winstead discusses 10 Cloverfield Lane.
109	March 14, 2016	John Oliver, Jordan Spieth	New Order
John Oliver discusses his takes on Donald Trump and the FBI–Apple encryption dispute. Jordan Spieth discusses his golf season and teaches Stephen how to swing. New Order performs "Singularity" from their album Music Complete.
110	March 15, 2016	Steve Martin & Edie Brickell, Shirley MacLaine	Gustavo Dudamel and the Los Angeles Philharmonic
Life Hacked. Steve Martin & Edie Brickell discuss Bright Star. Shirley MacLaine discusses her new book, Above the Line, My 'Wild Oats' Adventure and her career stories. Gustavo Dudamel and the Los Angeles Philharmonic give an orchestral performance of Fanfare for the Common Man.
111	March 16, 2016	Theo James, Jussie Smollett	Laurie Anderson
Theo James discusses The Divergent Series: Allegiant. Jussie Smollett discusses Empire and his career stories. An appearance from T. J. Miller. Laurie Anderson discusses Heart of a Dog, in addition to performing a composition for dogs.
112	March 17, 2016	William H. Macy, Melissa Rauch, Isaac Mizrahi	N/A
A special rendition of "Danny Boy". The Hungry for Power Games (Marco Rubio). William H. Macy discusses Shameless and his career. Barely Restrained Sorrow Theater with William H. Macy. Melissa Rauch discusses The Bronze. Isaac Mizrahi discusses fashion designs.
113	March 28, 2016	Tom Hiddleston, Laura Benanti	Frightened Rabbit
Tom Hiddleston discusses I Saw the Light and his education, in addition to performing a duet of "I Saw the Light" with Stephen. Laura Benanti discusses She Loves Me and Supergirl. Frightened Rabbit performs "Get Out" from their album Painting of a Panic Attack.
114	March 29, 2016	Adam Driver, Rachel Bloom	Savages
Stephen Colbert's Digital Doo. Adam Driver discusses Midnight Special. Rachel Bloom discusses Crazy Ex-Girlfriend. The Big Furry Hat. Savages performs "Adore" from their album Adore Life.
115	March 30, 2016	Eric Stonestreet, Jason Jones, Senator Elizabeth Warren	N/A
An interview with Cartoon Donald Trump. Eric Stonestreet discusses Confirmation and Modern Family. Jason Jones discusses The Detour. Senator Elizabeth Warren discusses the presidential race.
116	March 31, 2016	Sarah Paulson, Tatiana Maslany	Wynton Marsalis, Lil Buck & Jared Grimes
Wheel of News featuring Senator Bernie Sanders. Sarah Paulson discusses The People v. O. J. Simpson: American Crime Story. Tatiana Maslany discusses Orphan Black. Wynton Marsalis, Lil Buck and Jared Grimes give a Jazz-tap-jookin' performance, with Jazz at Lincoln Center Orchestra and Jon Batiste and Stay Human providing musical accompaniment.

=== April ===
No.	Original release date	Guest(s)	Musical/entertainment guest(s)
117	April 1, 2016	Steve Buscemi, Benjamin Walker	The cast of American Psycho
Friday Night Fights featuring Rob Riggle. Steve Buscemi discusses Horace and Pete. John Kasich (Buscemi) is upset by Fargo. Benjamin Walker discusses his Southern roots and American Psycho. Walker and the cast of American Psycho perform "Selling Out".
118	April 4, 2016	Matthew Perry, Nick Offerman	Explosions in the Sky
A cameo appearance from Pedro Martínez. George Clinton, Bootsy Collins and Bernie Worrell sit in with the band and provide musical accompaniment. An interview with Cartoon Donald Trump. Matthew Perry discusses The Odd Couple. Nick Offerman discusses his new book, Gumption. Community Calendar: Minooka, Illinois with Nick Offerman. Explosions in the Sky performs "Disintegration Anxiety" from their album The Wilderness.
119	April 5, 2016	Melissa McCarthy & Ben Falcone, Arianna Huffington	Babymetal
Stephen Colbert's Midnight Confessions. Melissa McCarthy and Ben Falcone discuss The Boss and their life as a couple. Smooshed with Melissa McCarthy and Ben Falcone. Arianna Huffington discusses her new book, The Sleep Revolution. Kawaii metal band Babymetal performs "Gimme Chocolate!!" from their album Babymetal.
120	April 6, 2016	Anna Kendrick & Sam Rockwell, David Duchovny	Autolux
Anna Kendrick and Sam Rockwell discuss Mr. Right. David Duchovny discusses his new book, Bucky F*cking Dent. Stephen takes another meeting. The Late Show Unused Prop Theater. Autolux performs "Soft Scene" from their album Pussy's Dead.
121	April 7, 2016	Mindy Kaling, Tituss Burgess, Ken Burns	N/A
The Road to the White House. Mindy Kaling discusses The Mindy Project. Tituss Burgess discusses Unbreakable Kimmy Schmidt. Ken Burns discusses Jackie Robinson.
122	April 18, 2016	Jesse Tyler Ferguson, Katharine McPhee	Sturgill Simpson
Wayne Shorter sits in with the band and provides musical accompaniment. The Road to the White House. What Does New York Smell Like? Stephen invites Hillary Clinton to the Carnegie Deli. Jesse Tyler Ferguson discusses Fully Committed. Katharine McPhee discusses Scorpion. Sturgill Simpson performs a song for the Waffle House jukebox with Stephen. Simpson also performs "Brace for Impact (Live a Little)" from his album A Sailor's Guide to Earth.
123	April 19, 2016	Kevin Spacey, Thomas Middleditch	The Flaming Lips
Arturo Sandoval sits in with the band and provides musical accompaniment. An interview with Paul Ryan. Kevin Spacey discusses Elvis & Nixon and House of Cards. Thomas Middleditch discusses Silicon Valley. The Flaming Lips honor David Bowie by performing "Space Oddity".
124	April 20, 2016	Dennis Quaid, Matt Walsh	Charles Bradley
Jimmy Heath and Tootie Heath sit in with the band and provide musical accompaniment. An interview with Cartoon Donald Trump. Dennis Quaid discusses The Art of More. Matt Walsh discusses Veep. Charles Bradley performs "Ain't It a Sin" from his album Changes.
125	April 21, 2016	Tom Hanks, Leslie Odom, Jr.	The Strumbellas
Roy Haynes sits in with the band and provides musical accompaniment. Stephen acknowledges the death of Prince. Tom Hanks discusses A Hologram for the King. "On Your Mark, Get Set, Act" with Tom Hanks and Stephen Colbert. Leslie Odom, Jr. discusses Hamilton. The Strumbellas perform "Spirits" from their album Hope.
126	April 22, 2016	Julia Louis-Dreyfus, Nikolaj Coster-Waldau	Sam Morril
Stephen Colbert's Midnight Confessions: Twitter Edition. Julia Louis-Dreyfus discusses Veep. Nikolaj Coster-Waldau discusses Game of Thrones. Friday Night Fights featuring Thomas Lennon. Sam Morril gives a stand-up performance.
127	April 25, 2016	Michelle Williams, Eddie Huang	Bob Mould
Stephen Colbert: White Mansplains. Michelle Williams discusses Blackbird. Eddie Huang discusses Huang's World. Bob Mould performs "The End of Things" from his album Patch the Sky.
128	April 26, 2016	J. K. Simmons, Jane Krakowski, Chris Wallace	N/A
Bill Walton announces the show. An interview with Cartoon Donald Trump. J.K. Simmons discusses The Meddler. "Stern Father Finally Praises You", with J. K. Simmons. Jane Krakowski discusses Unbreakable Kimmy Schmidt and She Loves Me. Late Show Unsung Heroes with Jane Krakowski and Stephen Colbert. Chris Wallace discusses Fox News Sunday and his career.
129	April 27, 2016	Susan Sarandon, David Tennant	Catfish and the Bottlemen
The Road to the White House. Susan Sarandon discusses The Meddler and the presidential race. David Tennant discusses Richard II. Late Show Lesser Sponsors Roundup. Catfish and the Bottlemen performs "Soundcheck" from their album The Ride.
130	April 28, 2016	Julianna Margulies, Christine Baranski & Matt Czuchry; Hank Azaria, Isaac Mizrahi, Phil Knight	N/A
Stephen Colbert's Just the Tip. Julianna Margulies, Christine Baranski and Matt Czuchry discuss The Good Wife. Hank Azaria discusses Dry Powder and his voice work. Late Show In or Out with Isaac Mizrahi. Phil Knight discusses his new book, Shoe Dog.
131	April 29, 2016	Anderson Cooper, Mark Feuerstein	Gwen Stefani
Wheel of News. Anderson Cooper discusses Nothing Left Unsaid and the presidential race. Mark Feuerstein discusses Royal Pains. Friday Night Fights featuring Jessica Williams. Gwen Stefani performs "Make Me Like You" from her album This Is What the Truth Feels Like.

=== May ===
No.	Original release date	Guest(s)	Musical/entertainment guest(s)
132	May 2, 2016	Bill O'Reilly, Morris Chestnut	Deerhunter
The Road to the White House. Bill O'Reilly discusses the presidential race. Morris Chestnut discusses Rosewood. Deerhunter performs "Living My Life" from their album Fading Frontier.
133	May 3, 2016	Dakota Johnson, Sebastian Stan	Lukas Nelson & Promise of the Real
The Road to the White House. Dakota Johnson discusses A Bigger Splash. Sebastian Stan discusses Captain America: Civil War. Lukas Nelson & Promise of the Real perform "Something Real" from their album of the same name.
134	May 4, 2016	Anthony Mackie, Rob Reiner, Buzz Aldrin	Maxwell
The Hungry for Power Games (John Kasich, Ted Cruz and Carly Fiorina). Anthony Mackie discusses Captain America: Civil War. Rob Reiner discusses Being Charlie. Buzz Aldrin discusses his new book, No Dream is Too High. Buzz Aldrin's Moon Scoops. Maxwell performs "Lake by the Ocean" from his album blackSUMMERS'night.
135	May 5, 2016	Judith Sheindlin, Zac Posen, W. Kamau Bell	N/A
Stephen Colbert's Just the Tip. Judith Sheindlin discusses Judge Judy. Zac Posen discusses the Met Gala. W. Kamau Bell discusses United Shades of America.
136	May 6, 2016	Lily Tomlin, Kumail Nanjiani	Ryan Hamilton
First Drafts. Lily Tomlin discusses Grace and Frankie. Late Show Blanket Fort with Lily Tomlin. Kumail Nanjiani discusses Silicon Valley. Friday Night Fights (featuring Lawrence O'Donnell). Ryan Hamilton gives a stand-up performance.
137	May 9, 2016	Kaley Cuoco, Dan Savage	The National
The Road to the White House. Kaley Cuoco discusses The Big Bang Theory. Dan Savage discusses Savage Love. Stephen Colbert's Star Signs. The National performs "Morning Dew" from their album Day of the Dead.
138	May 10, 2016	Chloë Grace Moretz, Katie Couric, Charlamagne Tha God	N/A
Chloë Grace Moretz discusses Neighbors 2: Sorority Rising. Katie Couric discusses Under the Gun. The Big Furry Hat Speaks Again. Charlamagne Tha God discusses The Breakfast Club and his South Carolinian heritage.
139	May 11, 2016	Kate Beckinsale, B. J. Novak	Desiigner
The Road to the White House. Kate Beckinsale discusses Love & Friendship. B. J. Novak discusses stories from his youth. Desiigner performs "Panda".
140	May 12, 2016	Ryan Gosling & Russell Crowe, Jessie Mueller	Animal Collective
Ryan Gosling & Russell Crowe discuss The Nice Guys. Jessie Mueller discusses Waitress, in addition to performing "Will You Love Me Tomorrow" with Stephen. Animal Collective performs "FloriDada" from their album Painting With.
141	May 13, 2016	Matt Bomer, Zach Woods	Nick Griffin
Matt Bomer discusses The Nice Guys. Zach Woods discusses Silicon Valley, in addition to playing the trumpet with Stephen. Friday Night Fights featuring Keith Olbermann. Nick Griffin gives a stand-up performance.
142	May 16, 2016	Jason Sudeikis, Michael Weatherly, Megyn Kelly	N/A
Jason Sudeikis discusses The Angry Birds Movie. The Late Show Interview Pit with Jason Sudeikis. Michael Weatherly discusses NCIS. Megyn Kelly discusses Megyn Kelly Presents.
143	May 17, 2016	Anthony Anderson, Eugene Levy & Catherine O'Hara	Coldplay
Anthony Anderson discusses Black-ish. Eugene Levy & Catherine O'Hara discuss Schitt's Creek. Coldplay performs "Hymn for the Weekend" and "Up&Up" from their album A Head Full of Dreams.
144	May 18, 2016	Josh Gad, Gillian Jacobs	Band of Horses
The Road to the White House: Kids Edition. Josh Gad discusses The Angry Birds Movie and his Floridian heritage. Gillian Jacobs discusses Love and Don't Think Twice. Band of Horses performs "Casual Party" from their album Why Are You OK.
145	May 19, 2016	Rose Byrne, Bobby Flay	"Weird Al" Yankovic
Rose Byrne discusses Neighbors 2: Sorority Rising. Bobby Flay and Stephen cook chicken biscuits. Weird Al Yankovic discusses his career, in addition to performing "Word Crimes" from his album Mandatory Fun. A tribute to Morley Safer.
146	May 20, 2016	Seth Rogen, Krysten Ritter	Wolf Parade
A musical number from On Your Feet!. Seth Rogen discusses Neighbors 2: Sorority Rising, in addition to playing the didgeridoo with Stephen. Not at the Movies with Gil Peaches. Krysten Ritter discusses Jessica Jones. Wolf Parade performs a medley of song from their eponymous EP.
147	May 23, 2016	Emilia Clarke, Shiri Appleby	Cynthia Erivo
The Late Show 2016 Commencement Speech. Emilia Clarke discusses Game of Thrones and Me Before You. Shiri Appleby discusses Unreal. Cynthia Erivo performs a musical number from The Color Purple.
148	May 24, 2016	Sean Hayes, Brooklyn Decker, Lewis Black	N/A
Stephen Colbert's Midnight Confessions. Sean Hayes discusses An Act of God. Brooklyn Decker discusses Grace and Frankie and her modelling career. Lewis Black discusses his comedy career.
149	May 25, 2016	James McAvoy, Nick Swardson, Brian Greene	N/A
James McAvoy discusses X-Men: Apocalypse and his Scottish heritage. Audience Mind Reading with James McAvoy. Nick Swardson discusses The Do-Over. Brian Greene discusses the hypernova.
150	May 26, 2016	Lizzy Caplan, Neil Young, Mike Epps	N/A
Lizzy Caplan discusses Now You See Me 2. Neil Young discusses Earth and his view on genetically modified foods. Mike Epps discusses Uncle Buck.
151	May 27, 2016	Rashida Jones, Daveed Diggs, Marina Franklin	The Struts
Rashida Jones discusses Angie Tribeca. Daveed Diggs discusses Hamilton. Marina Franklin gives a stand-up performance. The Struts perform "Kiss This" from their album Everybody Wants.

=== June ===
No.	Original release date	Guest(s)	Musical/entertainment guest(s)
152	June 6, 2016	James Corden, Scott Speedman	Death Cab for Cutie
A tribute to Muhammad Ali (featuring Kareem Abdul-Jabbar). James Corden discusses his hosting duties at the 70th Tony Awards. Scott Speedman discusses Animal Kingdom. Death Cab for Cutie performs "No Room in Frame" from their album Kintsugi.
153	June 7, 2016	Jude Law, Norman Reedus	Hundred Waters with Skrillex featuring Chance the Rapper
Monologue Remix with Skrillex and Chance the Rapper. Jude Law discusses Genius. Ping Pong Eyeball Acting with Jude Law. Norman Reedus discusses Ride. Hundred Waters performs "Show Me Love", featuring Skrillex and Chance the Rapper.
154	June 8, 2016	Laura Linney, John Leguizamo	Gary Clark, Jr.
Paula Robison sits in with the band and provides musical accompaniment. Laura Linney discusses Genius. John Leguizamo discusses Bloodline. Piano One-O-Fun with Jon Batiste. Gary Clark, Jr. performs "Cold Blooded" from his album The Story of Sonny Boy Slim, with Jon Batiste and Stay Human providing musical accompaniment.
155	June 9, 2016	Patrick Wilson, Gayle King, Governors Gary Johnson & William Weld	N/A
Patrick Wilson discusses The Conjuring 2. Gayle King discusses CBS This Morning and her career. Gary Johnson discusses his presidential campaign along with William Weld, his running mate.
156	June 10, 2016	David Duchovny, Aaron Tveit	Alexander Koblikov
David Duchovny discusses Aquarius. Late Show Blanket Fort with David Duchovny. Aaron Tveit discusses BrainDead. Stephen sails with Oracle Team USA. Alexander Koblikov gives a juggling performance.
157	June 13, 2016	Bill O'Reilly, Anna Chlumsky	Aesop Rock
Bill O'Reilly discusses the Orlando nightclub shooting and gun law in the United States. Stephen Colbert Takes the Gloves Off. Anna Chlumsky discusses Veep. Aesop Rock performs "Dorks" from his album The Impossible Kid, featuring Yo La Tengo.
158	June 14, 2016	Daniel Radcliffe, George Lopez	Hinds
Stephen draws diagrams. Daniel Radcliffe discusses Swiss Army Man. George Lopez discusses Lopez. A conversation about net neutrality with Tim Wu on a roller coaster. Hinds performs "Garden" from their album Leave Me Alone.
159	June 15, 2016	Liam Hemsworth, Ana Gasteyer	Paul Mecurio
A sketch with Scott Bakula (as Sam Beckett from Quantum Leap). Liam Hemsworth discusses Independence Day: Resurgence. Stephen Colbert's Beast Reality. Ana Gasteyer discusses Lady Dynamite. Paul Mecurio gives a stand-up performance.
160	June 16, 2016	Demi Lovato & Nick Jonas, Amy Ryan	Nick Jonas
Stephen Colbert's Midnight Confessions. Demi Lovato & Nick Jonas discuss the Future Now Tour. Amy Ryan discusses Central Intelligence. Nick Jonas performs "Close" from his album Last Year Was Complicated.
161	June 17, 2016	Aaron Paul, Michael Ian Black	Silversun Pickups
The Big Furry Hat: Father's Day Edition. Aaron Paul discusses The Path. Community Calendar: McCall, Idaho. Michael Ian Black discusses The Jim Gaffigan Show. Silversun Pickups performs "Circadian Rhythm" from their album Better Nature.
162	June 20, 2016	Alexander Skarsgård, Natasha Leggero	Ziggy Marley
Alexander Skarsgård discusses The Legend of Tarzan and his Swedish heritage. Natasha Leggero discusses Another Period. Ziggy Marley performs "Weekend's Long" from his album Ziggy Marley.
163	June 21, 2016	Aubrey Plaza, Hugh Dancy	Andrew Zimmern
Stephen Colbert Takes the Gloves Off. Aubrey Plaza discusses Mike and Dave Need Wedding Dates. Not at the Movies with Gil Peaches. Hugh Dancy discusses The Path. Andrew Zimmern and Stephen enjoy regional cuisine.
164	June 22, 2016	Uzo Aduba, Neil deGrasse Tyson	Adia Victoria
Uzo Aduba discusses Orange Is the New Black and her Nigerian heritage. Neil deGrasse Tyson discusses the strawberry moon. The Late Show Hollerin' Contest. Adia Victoria performs "Dead Eyes" from her album Beyond the Bloodhounds.
165	June 23, 2016	Senator Bernie Sanders, Paul Dano	Rascal Flatts
Stephen Colbert's Midnight Confessions: Twitter Edition. Bernie Sanders discusses his ongoing presidential campaign. Paul Dano discusses Swiss Army Man. Rascal Flatts performs "I Like the Sound of That" from their album Rewind.
166	June 24, 2016	Kevin Hart, Taylor Schilling, RuPaul Charles	N/A
Kevin Hart discusses The Secret Life of Pets. The Late Show Maybe Coming Soon with Kevin Hart. Taylor Schilling discusses Orange Is the New Black. RuPaul discusses his life as a drag performer.
167	June 27, 2016	Kevin Love, Jenny Slate	Dierks Bentley
Lesser Pope-pologies. Kevin Love discusses the Cavaliers' championship season. Jenny Slate discusses The Secret Life of Pets. Dierks Bentley performs "Different for Girls" from his album Black, featuring Elle King.
168	June 28, 2016	Tom Brokaw, Sara & Erin Foster	Bibi Bourelly
Tom Brokaw discusses his coverage of the 2016 Summer Olympics, the Brexit referendum, and A Lucky Life Interrupted. The Late Show New York Tales with Paul F. Tompkins, Arianna Huffington and William H. Macy. Sara & Erin Foster discuss Barely Famous. Bibi Bourelly performs "Perfect" from her EP Free the Real, featuring Earl St. Clair.
169	June 29, 2016	Samuel L. Jackson, Julie Klausner	Schoolboy Q
Samuel L. Jackson discusses The Legend of Tarzan. Big Questions with Even Bigger Stars (with Samuel L. Jackson). Julie Klausner discusses Difficult People. Schoolboy Q performs "THat Part" from his album Blank Face LP.
170	June 30, 2016	Ellie Kemper, Patrick Fugit	We Are Scientists
The Late Show Cultural Translations. Ellie Kemper discusses Unbreakable Kimmy Schmidt. Patrick Fugit discusses Outcast. Trip to Waffle House with Sturgill Simpson.

=== July ===
No.	Original release date	Guest(s)	Musical/entertainment guest(s)
171	July 1, 2016	Zachary Quinto, Natasha Lyonne, 2 Chainz	MitchFlowerPower
First Drafts. Zachary Quinto discusses Star Trek Beyond. Natasha Lyonne discusses Orange Is the New Black. 2 Chainz discusses Most Expensivest ####. The Late Show Three Legged Race with MitchFlowerPower, Stephen Colbert and the Columbia University Men's 4 × 400 Metres Relay Team.
172	July 11, 2016	Bryan Cranston, Busy Philipps	Blink-182
Stephen Colbert Takes the Gloves Off. Bryan Cranston discusses The Infiltrator. The Late Show Presents: Too Much Exposition Theatre with Bryan Cranston. Busy Philipps discusses Vice Principals. Blink-182 performs "Bored to Death" from their album California.
173	July 12, 2016	Nicholas Hoult, John Turturro, Bret Baier	Young Greatness
The Hungry for Power Games (Bernie Sanders). Nicholas Hoult discusses Equals. John Turturro discusses The Night Of. Bret Baier discusses the upcoming Republican National Convention. Young Greatness performs "Moolah" from his album I Tried to Tell Em 2, featuring DJ Holiday, with Jon Batiste and Stay Human providing musical accompaniment.
174	July 13, 2016	Benjamin Bratt, Rob Corddry	The Shelters
The Late Show Vice Presidential Draft Preview. Benjamin Bratt discusses The Infiltrator. Rob Corddry discusses Ballers. The Late Show Celebrity Pet Peeves. The Shelters perform "Rebel Heart" from their album The Shelters.
175	July 14, 2016	Bill Maher, Michael K. Williams	Parquet Courts
Stephen Colbert's Midnight Confessions. Bill Maher discusses the presidential race and the shooting of Dallas police officers. Michael K. Williams discusses Black Market. Parquet Courts performs "Captive of the Sun" from their album Human Performance.
176	July 15, 2016	Charlie Rose, Gayle King & Norah O'Donnell, DeRay McKesson	Bonnie McFarlane
The Big Furry Hat Speaks. Charlie Rose, Gayle King and Norah O'Donnell discuss the upcoming Republican and Democratic national conventions. DeRay McKesson discusses the Black Lives Matter movement. Bonnie McFarlane gives a stand-up performance.
177	July 18, 2016	Zoe Saldaña	N/A
Special live episode focusing on the 2016 Republican National Convention. "Christmas in July". Stephen travels into the woods to meet up with Jon Stewart and inform him that Donald Trump is the Republican nominee. Stephen Colbert, former host of The Colbert Report, returns to television to do a special segment of "The Wørd" with "Trumpiness". Zoe Saldaña discusses Star Trek Beyond. The Hungry for Power Games: Republican National Convention Edition. An Important Lookback with Sam Waterston from the Hall of Importance.
178	July 19, 2016	Keegan-Michael Key, Kathryn Hahn	Nice As ####
Second live episode during the RNC. A cameo appearance by Laura Benanti as Melania Trump. Keegan-Michael Key discusses Don't Think Twice and the presidential race. Kathryn Hahn discusses Bad Moms. Nice As #### performs a medley from their album Nice as F*#k.
179	July 20, 2016	Tony Goldwyn, Mark Cuban, Lewis Black	N/A
Third live episode during the RNC. Wyclef Jean sits in with the band and provides musical accompaniment. Mark Cuban Takes the Gloves Off and joins the Stop Trump movement. Late Show Trump or False. Tony Goldwyn discusses Scandal. Mark Cuban discusses Shark Tank. Lewis Black discusses the presidential race.
180	July 21, 2016	Senator Elizabeth Warren, Billy Eichner	N/A
Fourth live episode during the RNC. Jon Stewart briefly takes over the hosting duty. Elizabeth Warren discusses the presidential race. Billy Eichner discusses Difficult People and the convention.
181	July 22, 2016	Jennifer Saunders	Cory Kahaney
Highlights of The Late Show's RNC coverage in the past week (including cameo appearances by Jon Stewart and Laura Benanti, and the best of The Hungry for Power Games). Jennifer Saunders discusses Absolutely Fabulous and the film based on the series. Cory Kahaney gives a stand-up performance.
182	July 25, 2016	Allison Janney, Anthony Weiner	Ryan Adams
Special live episode focusing on the 2016 Democratic National Convention. "Death, Taxes, Hillary". The Hungry for Power Games: Democratic National Convention Edition. Allison Janney discusses Tallulah. Anthony Weiner discusses the presidential race. Ryan Adams performs "Oh My Sweet Carolina" from his album Heartbreaker.
183	July 26, 2016	Jeff Daniels, Bassem Youssef	AURORA
Second live episode during the DNC. On-air interview with Senator Cory Booker. An interview with Cartoon Hillary Clinton. Jeff Daniels discusses Godless. Bassem Youssef discusses Democracy Handbook and the presidential race. AURORA performs "I Went Too Far" from her album All My Demons Greeting Me as a Friend.
184	July 27, 2016	John Oliver, Jai Courtney, Charlamagne Tha God	N/A
Third live episode during the DNC. D.M.C. sits in with the band and provides musical accompaniment. The identical twin cousin of Stephen Colbert drops by. The Werd: "The Lesser of Two Evils". John Oliver discusses the presidential race. Jai Courtney discusses Suicide Squad. Charlamagne Tha God discusses the presidential race.
185	July 28, 2016	Abbi Jacobson & Ilana Glazer, Doris Kearns Goodwin, Eric André	N/A
Fourth live episode during the DNC. Abbi Jacobson, Ilana Glazer and Doris Kearns Goodwin discuss the presidential race. "The Last O'Malley Supporter" with Richard Kind. Eric André discusses The Eric Andre Show and the presidential race. "What Is the Nicest Thing You Can Say About Hillary Clinton/Donald Trump?".
186	July 29, 2016	N/A	N/A
Highlights of The Late Show's DNC coverage in the past week.

=== August ===
No.	Original release date	Guest(s)	Musical/entertainment guest(s)
187	August 1, 2016	Viola Davis, Simon Helberg	Declan McKenna
The Werd: "What The F". Viola Davis discusses Suicide Squad. Simon Helberg discusses Florence Foster Jenkins, in addition to giving a piano performance with Jon Batiste. Declan McKenna performs "Brazil" from his album What Do You Think About the Car?
188	August 2, 2016	Will Smith, Logan Lerman	Tony Bennett
Will Smith discusses Suicide Squad. Big Questions with Even Bigger Stars (with Will Smith). Logan Lerman discusses Indignation. Tony Bennett performs "This Is All I Ask". The Late Show celebrates Bennett's 90th birthday.
189	August 3, 2016	John Cena, Scott Eastwood	Aaron Neville
John Cena discusses SummerSlam 2016. Late Show City Gym. Scott Eastwood discusses Suicide Squad. Aaron Neville performs "Be Your Man" from his album Apache.
190	August 4, 2016	Jamie Dornan, Javier Muñoz, Malcolm Gladwell	N/A
The O'Jays sit in with the band and provide musical accompaniment. A performance by the USA Freedom Grown-ups. Jamie Dornan discusses Anthropoid. Javier Muñoz discusses Hamilton. Malcolm Gladwell discusses Revisionist History.
191	August 5, 2016	Diane Kruger, Ibtihaj Muhammad	Mark Normand
Stephen Colbert's Midnight Confessions: Twitter Edition. Diane Kruger discusses Disorder. Ibtihaj Muhammad discusses her fencing career, in addition to fencing with Stephen. Mark Normand gives a stand-up performance.
192	August 22, 2016	Amy Schumer, Omari Hardwick, Michaela Watkins	N/A
What Donald Trump Did On My Summer Vacation. Amy Schumer discusses The Girl with the Lower Back Tattoo. Omari Hardwick discusses Power. Michaela Watkins discusses Casual.
193	August 23, 2016	Rami Malek, Tika Sumpter & Parker Sawyers	Diana Gordon
The Late Show Thing-O-Meter. Rami Malek discusses Mr. Robot. Tika Sumpter and Parker Sawyers discuss Southside with You. Diana Gordon performs "Woman".
194	August 24, 2016	Anderson Cooper, Édgar Ramírez	Kip Moore
Stephen Colbert's Tinfoil Hat. Anderson Cooper discusses his coverage of the Olympics and the presidential race. Édgar Ramírez discusses Hands of Stone. Kip Moore performs "Wild Ones" from his album of the same name.
195	August 25, 2016	Senator Tim Kaine, Tony Hale	Car Seat Headrest
Tim Kaine discusses the presidential race. Tony Hale discusses Veep. Car Seat Headrest performs "Fill in the Blank" from their album Teens of Denial.
196	August 26, 2016	Rachel Weisz, Kevin Smith, Spike Feresten	N/A
The Big Furry Hat. Rachel Weisz discusses Complete Unknown. Kevin Smith discusses Yoga Hosers. Spike Feresten discusses Car Matchmaker.
197	August 29, 2016	Riz Ahmed, Pedro Pascal	Angel Olsen
Riz Ahmed discusses The Night Of. Pedro Pascal discusses Narcos. Angel Olsen performs "Shut Up Kiss Me" from her album My Woman.
198	August 30, 2016	John Krasinski, Adam Brody	St. Paul & the Broken Bones
The Werd: Double Vision. John Krasinski discusses The Hollars, in addition to having a vomit-off with Stephen. Adam Brody discusses StartUp. St. Paul & the Broken Bones perform "All I Ever Wonder" from their album Sea of Noise.
199	August 31, 2016	Christian Slater, Chris Geere, Congressman John Lewis	N/A
Christian Slater discusses Mr. Robot. Chris Geere discusses You're the Worst. John Lewis discusses March. All three guests participate in crowd surfing with Stephen at the conclusion of their interviews.

=== September ===
No.	Original release date	Guest(s)	Musical/entertainment guest(s)
200	September 1, 2016	Larry Wilmore, Chris Noth	Sampha
Larry Wilmore discusses The Nightly Show and his performance at the White House Correspondents' Dinner. Chris Noth discusses White Girl, his career and his mother. Sampha performs "Blood on Me" from his album Process.
201	September 2, 2016	Anna Gunn, John Dickerson	Simone Giertz
Anna Gunn discusses Equity. Lesser Sponsor Roundup. John Dickerson discusses the presidential debates and Whistlestop. Simone Giertz demonstrates her robots.
202	September 6, 2016	Harry Connick Jr., Ava DuVernay	Grouplove
(First episode of Season 2) Harry Connick Jr. discusses his New Orleans heritage and musical career. Ava DuVernay discusses Queen Sugar. Grouplove performs "Welcome to Your Life" from their album Big Mess.
203	September 7, 2016	Whoopi Goldberg, Regina Hall, Chesley Sullenberger	N/A
Whoopi Goldberg discusses cannabis and Strut. Regina Hall discusses When the Bough Breaks. Chesley Sullenberger discusses Sully and the "Miracle on the Hudson".
204	September 8, 2016	Jessica Alba, Bradley Whitford, George Takei	N/A
Jessica Alba discusses The Honest Company. Bradley Whitford discusses Other People. George Takei discusses the Star Trek franchise.
205	September 9, 2016	Tituss Burgess, Jeff Ross, Adam Richman	N/A
The Late Show Money I've Already Spent Justification Theater. Tituss Burgess discusses Unbreakable Kimmy Schmidt. Jeff Ross discusses Jeff Ross Roasts Cops. Adam Richman discusses Secret Eats.
206	September 12, 2016	Dr. Phil, Alan Cumming	Hamilton Leithauser + Rostam
Stephen Colbert's Midnight Confessions. Dr. Phil discusses his TV series. Alan Cumming discusses You Gotta Get Bigger Dreams. Hamilton Leithauser + Rostam perform "A 1000 Times" from their album I Had a Dream That You Were Mine.
207	September 13, 2016	Joseph Gordon-Levitt, Millie Bobby Brown	The Head and the Heart
Joseph Gordon-Levitt discusses Snowden. Millie Bobby Brown discusses Stranger Things. The Head and the Heart performs "All We Ever Knew" from their album Signs of Light.
208	September 14, 2016	Trevor Noah, Allen Iverson, Chris Gethard	N/A
Wednesday Night Thursday Night Football Promo. Trevor Noah discusses his new book, Born a Crime. Allen Iverson discusses his induction into the Basketball Hall of Fame. Chris Gethard discusses The Chris Gethard Show.
209	September 15, 2016	Tracee Ellis Ross, Andrew Rannells	Mac Miller featuring Anderson .Paak
Tracee Ellis Ross discusses Black-ish. Late Show Polite Reminder. Andrew Rannells discusses his mid-western heritage. Mac Miller performs "Dang!" from his album The Divine Feminine, featuring Anderson .Paak, with Jon Batiste and Stay Human providing musical accompaniment.
210	September 16, 2016	John Slattery, Oliver Stone	Jon Fisch
The Big Furry Hat. John Slattery discusses The Front Page. Oliver Stone discusses Snowden. Jon Fisch gives a stand-up performance.
211	September 19, 2016	Chris Pratt, Scott Bakula	Frederik the Great
Chris Pratt discusses The Magnificent Seven and his early life as a salesman. Scott Bakula discusses NCIS: New Orleans and his career, in addition to giving a musical performance with Jon Batiste and Stay Human. Frederik the Great, the World's Most Beautiful Horse, makes an appearance.
212	September 20, 2016	First Lady Michelle Obama, America Ferrera	N/A
The Late Show Blanket Fort with the First Lady. Michelle Obama discusses her life in the White House and the "Let Girls Learn" initiative. America Ferrera discusses Superstore.
213	September 21, 2016	Ethan Hawke, Tim Meadows	Wilco
Nile Rodgers sits in with the band and provides musical accompaniment. Ethan Hawke discusses The Magnificent Seven. Tim Meadows discusses Son of Zorn. Wilco performs "Someone to Lose" from their album Schmilco.
214	September 22, 2016	Anthony Anderson, Mark Consuelos	The Kills
Stephen visits Wrigley Field in support of the Chicago Cubs. Anthony Anderson discusses Black-ish and the Emmy Awards. Mark Consuelos discusses Pitch and his life in New York City. The Kills perform "Impossible Tracks" from their album Ash & Ice.
215	September 23, 2016	Bruce Springsteen	N/A
Bruce Springsteen discusses his life stories, his autobiography Born to Run, and its companion album Chapter and Verse. The Late Show celebrates Springsteen's 67th birthday.
216	September 26, 2016	Rob Lowe, Kal Penn	Emma Willmann
Special live episode after the first presidential debate. Rob Lowe discusses the presidential race. Kal Penn discusses the presidential race and his career in the White House. Emma Willmann gives a stand-up performance.
217	September 27, 2016	Sean Penn, Sutton Foster	Regina Spektor
Sean Penn discusses Bob Honey Who Just Do Stuff and sends his first tweet. Sutton Foster discusses Younger. Regina Spektor performs "Bleeding Heart" from her album Remember Us to Life.
218	September 28, 2016	Lupita Nyong'o, Donnie Wahlberg	John Prine
Jon Batiste's PSA: Hey, White People! Lupita Nyong'o discusses Queen of Katwe and her African heritage. Donnie Wahlberg discusses Blue Bloods and goes crowd surfing with Stephen. John Prine performs "I'm Tellin' You" from his album For Better, or Worse, featuring Holly Williams.
219	September 29, 2016	Morgan Freeman, Judith Light	Jimmy Eat World
Morgan Freeman discusses Madam Secretary. Judith Light discusses Transparent. Jimmy Eat World performs "Sure and Certain" from their album Integrity Blues.
220	September 30, 2016	Samantha Bee, Abby Elliott, Asa Butterfield	N/A
Stephen Colbert's Midnight Confessions. Samantha Bee discusses Full Frontal and the presidential race. Abby Elliott discusses Better Off Single and receives/destroys her wedding gift. Asa Butterfield discusses Miss Peregrine's Home for Peculiar Children.

=== October ===
No.	Original release date	Guest(s)	Musical/entertainment guest(s)
221	October 3, 2016	Mindy Kaling, Gary Owen	Sum 41
Mindy Kaling discusses The Mindy Project and takes a shopping stroll. Gary Owen discusses The Gary Owen Show and his life in the Navy. Sum 41 performs "Fake My Own Death" from their album 13 Voices.
222	October 4, 2016	John Leguizamo, Cheri Oteri, Paul F. Tompkins	N/A
Special live episode after the vice presidential debate. Melissa Etheridge sits in with the band and provides musical accompaniment. John Leguizamo discusses the presidential race and his Latin American heritage. Cheri Oteri discusses Those Who Can't and the presidential race. Paul F. Tompkins discusses Bajillion Dollar Propertie$.
223	October 5, 2016	Armie Hammer, Lindsey Vonn	Gustavo Dudamel with the Simón Bolívar Symphony Orchestra
Armie Hammer discusses The Birth of a Nation. Lindsey Vonn discusses her new book, Strong Is the New Beautiful. Gustavo Dudamel with the Simón Bolívar Symphony Orchestra give an orchestral performance.
224	October 6, 2016	Emily Blunt, Gael García Bernal	Phantogram
Emily Blunt discusses The Girl on the Train. Gael García Bernal discusses Desierto. Phantogram performs "You Don't Get Me High Anymore" from their album Three.
225	October 7, 2016	Diane Lane, Aja Naomi King	Alingon Mitra
The Big Furry Hat. Diane Lane discusses The Cherry Orchard. Aja Naomi King discusses The Birth of a Nation. Alingon Mitra gives a stand-up performance.
226	October 10, 2016	Amy Schumer, Omari Hardwick, Michaela Watkins	N/A
Repeat of August 22, 2016 episode with new monologue inserted, recorded in Stephen's home, discussing the previous night's presidential debate.
227	October 17, 2016	Bill O'Reilly, Randall Park	Bob Weir
A special segment with President Barack Obama. Billy O'Reilly discusses the presidential race and his new book, Killing the Rising Sun. Randall Park discusses Fresh Off the Boat. Bob Weir performs "Lay My Lily Down" from his album Blue Mountain.
228	October 18, 2016	Nick Offerman, Wayne Gretzky, Morgan Spurlock	N/A
Nick Offerman discusses his new book, Good Clean Fun. Wayne Gretzky discusses his new book, 99: Stories of the Game and his career. Morgan Spurlock discusses Rats NYC.
229	October 19, 2016	Hugh Laurie, Paul Reiser, Nate Silver	N/A
Special live episode after the presidential debate. Hugh Laurie discusses Chance and the presidential race. Paul Reiser discusses the presidential race. Nate Silver discusses the presidential race.
230	October 20, 2016	Tiger Woods, Elijah Wood, Jorge Ramos	N/A
Tiger Woods discusses his career and the Tiger Woods Foundation. Elijah Wood discusses Dirk Gently's Holistic Detective Agency. Jorge Ramos discusses Hate Rising.
231	October 21, 2016	Matt LeBlanc, Joy Bryant & Congresswoman Eleanor Holmes Norton	Wyclef Jean
The Late Show Hall of Heroes. The Late Show Presents: Taking It to the Street. Matt LeBlanc discusses Man with a Plan. Joy Bryant and Eleanor Holmes Norton discuss Good Girls Revolt. Wyclef Jean performs "If I Was President", with Jon Batiste and Stay Human providing musical accompaniment.
232	October 24, 2016	Tom Hanks, Adam Conover	N/A
Tom Hanks returns to Zoltar, and discusses Inferno and the upcoming World Series. Adam Conover discusses Adam Ruins Everything.
233	October 25, 2016	Will Forte, Dermot Mulroney, Wyatt Cenac	N/A
Mitski sits in with the band and provides musical accompaniment. Will Forte discusses his new book, 101 Things to Definitely Not Do If You Want to Get a Chick. Dermot Mulroney discusses Pure Genius. Wyatt Cenac discusses People of Earth.
234	October 26, 2016	Joel McHale, Abbi Jacobson, Jon Glaser	N/A
The Werd. Joel McHale discusses The Great Indoors. Abbi Jacobson discusses her new book, Carry This Book. Jon Glaser discusses Jon Glaser Loves Gear.
235	October 27, 2016	Mary-Louise Parker, Pusha T	The Record Company
World premiere of "Halloween Wiggle" featuring Run the Jewels. Stephen Colbert's Midnight Confessions. Mary-Louise Parker discusses Heisenberg. Pusha T discusses his career and the presidential race. The Record Company performs "On the Move" from their album Give It Back to You.
236	October 28, 2016	Drew Carey, Claire Foy & Matt Smith	Sebastian Maniscalco
Aimee Mann sits in with the band and provides musical accompaniment. Drew Carey celebrates his tenth year as the host of The Price Is Right. Claire Foy and Matt Smith discuss The Crown. Sebastian Maniscalco gives a stand-up performance.
237	October 31, 2016	Ruth Wilson, J. B. Smoove, The Ghost Brothers	N/A
Ruth Wilson discusses I Am the Pretty Thing That Lives in the House. J. B. Smoove discusses Almost Christmas. The Ghost Brothers discuss ghost hunting.

=== November ===
No.	Original release date	Guest(s)	Musical/entertainment guest(s)
238	November 1, 2016	Mel Gibson, Luke Bracey	Tegan and Sara
Big Questions with Even Bigger Stars (with Mel Gibson). Mel Gibson and Luke Bracey discuss Hacksaw Ridge. Tegan and Sara perform "Stop Desire" from their album Love You to Death.
239	November 2, 2016	Michael Strahan, Nick Kroll	Aaron Lewis
Piano One-O-Fun (How to Vote) with Jon Batiste. Michael Strahan discusses Religion of Sports. Nick Kroll discusses Oh, Hello and Loving. Aaron Lewis performs "That Ain't Country" from his album Sinner.
240	November 3, 2016	Aaron Eckhart, Tig Notaro, Ron Suskind	N/A
Stephen Colbert's Tinfoil Hat. Aaron Eckhart discusses Bleed for This. Tig Notaro discusses her Southern heritage. Ron Suskind discusses Life, Animated.
241	November 4, 2016	Viggo Mortensen, Patton Oswalt	Maz Jobrani
Stephen Colbert's Charity PSA with Viggo Mortensen. Viggo Mortensen discusses Captain Fantastic and the presidential race. Patton Oswalt discusses the loss of his wife and the presidential race. Maz Jobrani gives a stand-up performance.
242	November 7, 2016	Don Cheadle, Stevie Wonder, Katherine Waterston	Stevie Wonder
Special live episode during the final phase of the presidential race. "Get Out There and Vote" medley featuring Jon Stewart and Javier Muñoz. Don Cheadle discusses the presidential race. Stevie Wonder discusses the presidential race, in addition to performing "Love's in Need of Love Today" and "Don't You Worry 'bout a Thing". Katherine Waterston discusses Fantastic Beasts and Where to Find Them, with an appearance by Sam Waterston.
243	November 9, 2016	Miles Teller, Neil deGrasse Tyson, Triumph the Insult Comic Dog	N/A
Special live episode during the week of the presidential race. Miles Teller discusses Bleed for This and the presidential race. Neil deGrasse Tyson discusses Welcome to the Universe and the presidential race. Triumph the Insult Comic Dog discusses Triumph's Election Special 2016.
244	November 10, 2016	Sting, Thandie Newton	Sting
Sting discusses his career. Thandie Newton discusses Westworld. Sting also performs "I Can't Stop Thinking About You" from his album 57th & 9th.
245	November 11, 2016	Mark Halperin & John Heilemann, Jeff Goldblum	Elle King
Highlights of Stephen Colbert's Live Election Night Showtime special: Mark Halperin & John Heilemann discuss The Circus and the election results as they come in. "Trump Begins" animated sketch. Jeff Goldblum reflects on the election results. Elle King performs. Stephen seeks to find things all Americans have in common.
246	November 14, 2016	Eddie Redmayne, Senator Bernie Sanders, Alton Brown	N/A
Chris Thile sits in with the band and provides musical accompaniment. Eddie Redmayne discusses Fantastic Beasts and Where to Find Them. Bernie Sanders discusses the presidential race and Our Revolution. Alton Brown and Stephen make carbonated ice cream.
247	November 15, 2016	Anna Kendrick, Mahershala Ali	Chris Gethard
Anna Kendrick discusses Scrappy Little Nobody in addition to performing "I'm Still Here" with Stephen. Mahershala Ali discusses Moonlight. Chris Gethard gives a stand-up performance.
248	November 16, 2016	Marion Cotillard, Dev Patel	Dwight Yoakam
Marion Cotillard discusses Allied. Dev Patel discusses Lion. Dwight Yoakam performs "Gone (That'll Be Me)" from his album Swimmin' Pools, Movie Stars....
249	November 17, 2016	Amy Adams, Simone Biles, Jeff Watson	N/A
Amy Adams discusses Nocturnal Animals. The Late Show Eyebrow Theater with Amy Adams. Simone Biles discusses Courage to Soar. Jeff Watson discusses bear-handling.
250	November 18, 2016	William H. Macy, Colin Quinn	Drive-By Truckers
The Late Show Family Meeting with William H. Macy. William H. Macy discusses Shameless. Colin Quinn discusses The New York Story. Drive-By Truckers perform "Surrender Under Protest" from their album American Band.
251	November 21, 2016	Michael Weatherly, Carrie Fisher	The Pretenders
Michael Weatherly discusses Bull. Carrie Fisher discusses her new book, The Princess Diarist and Gary, her French bulldog. Carrie Fisher's Other Star Wars Revelations. The Pretenders perform "Holy Commotion" from their album Alone, featuring Dan Auerbach.
252	November 22, 2016	James Marsden, Jimmie Johnson, John Waters	N/A
Stephen Colbert's Thanksgiving Turkey Tips. James Marsden discusses Westworld. Jimmie Johnson discusses his victorious NASCAR season. John Waters discusses his "A John Waters Christmas" tour.
253	November 23, 2016	Danny DeVito, Max Greenfield	OK Go
Post-election Thanksgiving Survival Tips. Stephen Colbert's Thanksgiving Turkey Tips, Part II. Danny DeVito discusses The Comedian. Max Greenfield discusses New Girl and his new career as a soccer referee. OK Go performs "The One Moment" from their album Hungry Ghosts.
254	November 30, 2016	Tim Daly, Lauren Cohan	Sleigh Bells
Stephen Colbert's Midnight Confessions. Tim Daly discusses Madam Secretary and the presidential race. Lauren Cohan discusses The Walking Dead. Sleigh Bells performs "I Can Only Stare" from their album Jessica Rabbit.

=== December ===
No.	Original release date	Guest(s)	Musical/entertainment guest(s)
255	December 1, 2016	Lauren Graham, Justin Long	N/A
Good News Bananas! Lauren Graham discusses Gilmore Girls: A Year in the Life and Talking as Fast as I Can. Justin Long discusses Frank & Lola.
256	December 2, 2016	Matthew Broderick, Ali Wentworth	Fergie
The Big Furry Hat. Matthew Broderick discusses Rules Don't Apply. Matthew Broderick's job offers. Ali Wentworth discusses Nightcap. Fergie performs "Life Goes On" from her album Double Dutchess.
257	December 5, 2016	Jason Bateman, Padma Lakshmi, Michael Lewis	N/A
Jason Bateman discusses Office Christmas Party. Padma Lakshmi discusses her new books, The Encyclopedia of Spices and Herbs and Love, Loss, and What We Ate. Michael Lewis discusses The Undoing Project.
258	December 6, 2016	Vice President Joe Biden, DJ Khaled	N/A
The Late Show Family Meeting with Joe Biden. Joe Biden discusses the presidential race and the fight against cancer. DJ Khaled discusses his new book, The Keys.
259	December 7, 2016	Sigourney Weaver, Andy Cohen	Pilobolus
Sigourney Weaver discusses the presidential race and A Monster Calls. Andy Cohen discusses Watch What Happens: Live and Superficial. Pilobolus gives a modern dance performance.
260	December 8, 2016	Octavia Spencer, John Mulaney	Travis Scott
First Drafts. Octavia Spencer discusses Hidden Figures. John Mulaney discusses Oh, Hello and his Catholic background. Travis Scott performs a medley ("Sweet Sweet" and "Goosebumps") from his album Birds in the Trap Sing McKnight.
261	December 9, 2016	Olivia Munn, Martin Freeman	Tom Papa
Norm or Law? Olivia Munn discusses Office Christmas Party. Martin Freeman discusses Sherlock. Tom Papa gives a stand-up performance.
262	December 12, 2016	John Goodman, Denée Benton	Norah Jones
"Christmas is Now". John Goodman discusses Patriots Day. Denée Benton discusses Natasha, Pierre & The Great Comet of 1812. Norah Jones performs "Peace" from her album Day Breaks.
263	December 13, 2016	Mark Wahlberg, Lee Daniels	Miranda Lambert
Stephen Colbert's Midnight Confessions. Mark Wahlberg discusses Patriots Day. Lee Daniels discusses Star. Miranda Lambert performs "Highway Vagabond" from her album The Weight of These Wings.
264	December 14, 2016	Neil Patrick Harris, Megan Mullally	N/A
The Nixon/Trump Letters: Volume I. Neil Patrick Harris discusses A Series of Unfortunate Events, in addition to performing a creepy version of "Jingle Bells" with Stephen. Megan Mullally discusses Why Him?. Smooshed: Holiday Edition with Megan Mullally and Nick Offerman.
265	December 15, 2016	James Franco, Michael Stipe	Gad Elmaleh
"It's the End of the Year as We Know It (And I Feel Fine)". Not at the Movies with Gil Peaches and Will Peaches. James Franco discusses Why Him?. Michael Stipe discusses his art. Gad Elmaleh gives a stand-up performance.
266	December 16, 2016	Liam Neeson, Shepard Smith	Jon Batiste
Stephen Colbert's Bah Humbug. Jon Batiste's Batman Christmas Medley. The Big Furry Hat. Liam Neeson discusses Silence. Shepard Smith discusses Shepard Smith Reporting. Jon Batiste and assorted musicians perform a medley of holiday songs.
