= Blue Blood Blues =

Single by The Dead Weather

from the album Sea of Cowards
- Released: June 25, 2010
- Recorded: December 2009
- Studio: Third Man Studio
- Genre: Blues rock, hard rock
- Length: 3:22
- Label: Third Man
- Songwriter: A-Side:Fertita/Lawrence/White
- Producer: Jack White

The Dead Weather singles chronology
"Die By The Drop" (2010)	"Blue Blood Blues" (2010)	"Open Up (That's Enough)" (2014)

"Blue Blood Blues" is the second single to be taken from the album Sea of Cowards by the alternative rock group the Dead Weather. It was released digitally on June 25, 2010.

In Elle magazine, the song was named one of 10 "essential" songs produced by Jack White. NME listed the single as one of 20 "unspeakably exciting" songs by White. NME and Rolling Stone pointed out the song's emphatic guitar work based on "Jack Lawrence's grunting fuzz bass [and] Dean Fertita's abrasive skidding guitar". Spin said the guitar runs were "Sabbath-worthy", referring to the hard rock of Black Sabbath. White's vocals were seen to bury those of singer Alison Mosshart. Antiquiet observed that the song was unusual for the Dead Weather in that it felt like a solo piece featuring White.

The song was featured briefly in the E4 comedy-drama television series Misfits in Episode 2, Season 2. It also was played in the closing credits of the Showtime series United States of Tara, in Episode 3, Season 3.

== Music video ==
The video for "Blue Blood Blues" premiered on teamcoco.com, the official website of Jack White's friend Conan O'Brien, on June 24, 2010. The recording is an edited live performance from May 3, 2010, at Third Man Records. The style of the video is high contrast solarized black & white, similar to the video for "Fried My Little Brains" by the Kills, the other band of Dead Weather singer Alison Mosshart.

== Track listing ==
=== 7 inch ===
The following tracks appear on the 7 inch version of the single.

No.	Title	Length
1.	"Blue Blood Blues"
2.	"Jawbreaker (Live)"

=== 12 inch ===
No.	Title	Length
1.	"Blue Blood Blues"
2.	"No Hassle Night/I Just Want To Make Love To You (Live)"

== Triple-decker record release ==
In September 2010, Jack White announced a new format of vinyl record: a "triple-decker record" which is an A-side 12-inch record with a 7-inch record sandwiched inside containing a hidden track. To listen to the 7-inch record, the listener must crack the 12-inch record open with a knife into two circular plates, revealing the inner record which can then be played separately. "Blue Blood Blues" was the first song appearing in this format, in a limited release of 300 units that contained the song "I Feel Strange" inside. A record-pressing plant in Nashville, Tennessee, filled the custom order.
