= Horehound (album) =

Studio album by the Dead Weather
- Released: July 14, 2009
- Recorded: January 2009
- Studio: Third Man, Nashville, Tennessee
- Genre: Garage rock; blues rock
- Length: 43:55
- Label: Third Man/Warner Bros.
- Producer: Jack White

The Dead Weather chronology
Horehound (2009)	Sea of Cowards (2010)

Singles from Horehound
- 1. "Hang You from the Heavens" Released: March 11, 2009; 2. "Treat Me Like Your Mother" Released: May 25, 2009; 3. "I Cut Like a Buffalo" Released: October 26, 2009

Professional ratings
Aggregate scores
Source	Rating
AnyDecentMusic?	6.8/10
Metacritic	75/100
Review scores
Source	Rating
AllMusic	3.5/5 stars
The Daily Telegraph	4/5 stars
Entertainment Weekly	B
The Guardian	3/5 stars
The Independent	3/5 stars
Los Angeles Times	4/4 stars
MSN Music (Consumer Guide)	A−
NME	5/10
Pitchfork	7.5/10
Rolling Stone	4/5 stars

Horehound is the debut studio album by American rock band the Dead Weather. It was released on July 10 in Australia, July 13 in Europe, and in North America on July 14, 2009. The album was recorded at Third Man Studios during a three-week session in January 2009.

The first single from the album, "Hang You from the Heavens", was released through iTunes on March 11, 2009, and on vinyl on April 18, 2009. "Treat Me Like Your Mother" was released as the second single from the album on May 25, 2009. The third single from the album was set to be "I Cut Like a Buffalo" and includes a cover of The West Coast Pop Art Experimental Band's "A Child of a Few Hours Is Burning to Death" as a B-side.

The album debuted at No. 6 on the US Billboard 200 albums chart and at No. 14 on the UK Albums Chart. As of 2010, sales in the United States have exceeded 163,000 copies, according to Nielsen SoundScan.

== Track listing ==
No.	Title	Writer(s)	Length
1.	"60 Feet Tall"	Alison Mosshart; Dean Fertita	5:33
2.	"Hang You from the Heavens"	Mosshart; Fertita	3:40
3.	"I Cut Like a Buffalo"	Jack White	3:28
4.	"So Far from Your Weapon"	Mosshart	3:40
5.	"Treat Me Like Your Mother"	Mosshart; White; Jack Lawrence; Fertita	4:10
6.	"Rocking Horse"	Mosshart; White	3:00
7.	"New Pony"	Bob Dylan	3:58
8.	"Bone House"	Mosshart; White; Lawrence; Fertita	3:26
9.	"3 Birds" (instrumental)	Mosshart; White; Lawrence; Fertita	3:44
10.	"No Hassle Night"	Mosshart; White	2:56
11.	"Will There Be Enough Water?"	White; Fertita	6:20

iTunes pre-order
No.	Title	Writer(s)	Length
12.	"Outside" (Downliners Sect cover)	Arthur Keith Evans, Michael O'Donnell	2:50

Japanese version
No.	Title	Writer(s)	Length
12.	"You Just Can't Win" (Them cover)	Van Morrison
13.	"Are 'Friends' Electric?" (Tubeway Army cover)	Gary Numan

== Personnel ==
- Alison Mosshart – vocals, guitar on "3 Birds" and "I Cut Like a Buffalo", percussion
- Dean Fertita – guitar, organ, piano, synthesizer, backing vocals, bass on "Rocking Horse"
- Jack Lawrence – bass, drums on "Will There Be Enough Water?", guitar on "Rocking Horse", backing vocals
- Jack White – drums, vocals, acoustic guitar on "Will There Be Enough Water?", production

== Charts ==
Chart (2009)	Peak position
Australian Albums (ARIA)	48
Austrian Albums (Ö3 Austria)	43
Belgian Albums (Ultratop Flanders)	24
Belgian Albums (Ultratop Wallonia)	39
Canadian Albums (Billboard)	7
French Albums (SNEP)	19
German Albums (Offizielle Top 100)	65
Irish Albums (IRMA)	56
Dutch Albums (Album Top 100)	63
Norwegian Albums (VG-lista)	26
Swiss Albums (Schweizer Hitparade)	14
New Zealand Albums (RMNZ)	24
UK Albums (OCC)	14
US Billboard 200	6
US Top Alternative Albums (Billboard)	1
US Top Rock Albums (Billboard)	2
US Indie Store Album Sales (Billboard)	1

== Certifications ==
Region	Certification	Certified units/sales
United Kingdom (BPI)	Silver	60,000^{*}
^{*} Sales figures based on certification alone.
