= Treat Me Like Your Mother =

Single by The Dead Weather

from the album Horehound
- B-side: "You Just Can't Win (vinyl only)"
- Released: May 25, 2009
- Recorded: January 2009 at Third Man Studio
- Genre: Alternative rock, garage rock
- Length: 4:10
- Label: Third Man
- Songwriters: Alison Mosshart, Jack Lawrence, Jack White, Dean Fertita
- Producer: Jack White

The Dead Weather singles chronology
"Hang You from the Heavens" (2009)	"Treat Me Like Your Mother" (2009)	"I Cut Like A Buffalo" (2009)

"Treat Me Like Your Mother" is a single released by the alternative rock band The Dead Weather. It is the second single released off of the band's debut album Horehound (after "Hang You from the Heavens" was released in March 2009). The single was released on May 25, 2009, and released with the album on July 14, 2009.

The song was co-written by every member of the band. Alison Mosshart told Mojo magazine about the writing process of the band: "Everybody just did what they wanted. I wrote most of the lyrics because that's my favorite thing, and everybody wrote different parts to the music- someone would lead with something and I'd be writing furiously, and within an hour we'd have something good enough to record or work on. It was super-easy and super-quick."

As a B-side, the 7" vinyl single features as "You Just Can't Win", a Van Morrison penned song originally performed by Them and featured on the album The Angry Young Them. The digital single has no B-side, though an alternate version of the digital single features a remix of the title track by the DJ Diplo instead of the album version.

The song appeared as downloadable content for the video game Rock Band along with "Hang You from the Heavens" and "No Hassle Night" on July 14, 2009, to coincide with the release of the album.

== Chart performance ==
The single fared decently on the US and UK charts. It peaked at number 40 on Billboard's Alternative Songs chart and at number 168 on the UK Singles Chart.

== Music video ==
A short film was made in support of the single. It was directed by Jonathan Glazer.

The video features drummer Jack White and lead vocalist Alison Mosshart walking across an open field outside of a suburban neighborhood carrying automatic weapons (M4 carbine by Jack White and Heckler & Koch MP5 by Alison Mosshart) and dressed in black leather jackets. They then proceed to fire at each other. Both White and Mosshart exhibit superhuman strength and show little reaction to being shot many times. As the video concludes, the two approach each other and stop at a very close range, both taking an increasing number of hits until they both run out of ammunition. They pause and White proceeds to turn and walk off into the sunset (possibly in defeat), with the sun shining through his many bullet wounds.

The video was filmed in Lancaster, California.

The video was also rated 1st in the top 50 videos of 2009 by NME on NME TV, in the UK.

== Personnel ==
- Alison Mosshart – vocals
- Dean Fertita – synthesizer, guitar
- Jack Lawrence – bass
- Jack White – drums, vocals, production
