= Die by the Drop =

Single by The Dead Weather

from the album Sea of Cowards
- B-side: "Old Mary"
- Released: March 30, 2010
- Recorded: December 2009 at Third Man Studio
- Genre: Blues-rock, garage rock, gothic rock
- Length: 3:28
- Label: Third Man
- Songwriter: A-Side:Fertita/Lawrence/Mosshart B-Side:Jack White
- Producer: Jack White

The Dead Weather singles chronology
"I Cut Like a Buffalo" (2009)	"Die by the Drop" (2010)	"Blue Blood Blues" (2010)

"Die by the Drop" is the first single from The Dead Weather's second album Sea of Cowards. It was released on March 30, 2010, in the United States and April 25 in the UK. The single includes the B-side "Old Mary".

The video of the song was directed by Floria Sigismondi who also directed the videos for "Blue Orchid" by The White Stripes and "Broken Boy Soldier" by The Raconteurs, Jack White's other two bands. It is the band's first official video to show all of the Dead Weather members playing their instruments. Footage from the video was used in teaser trailers for the band's upcoming singles, "Blue Blood Blues", "Gasoline" and "Jawbreaker".

== Track listing ==
- A. "Die by the Drop"
- B. "Old Mary"

== Reception ==
John Sakamoto for the Toronto Star said the song "sounds like it should weigh a tonne," with "relentless guitar riffs, throbbing drums, an insistent, plinking piano part, and very loud vocals by White and Alison Mosshart, who don't so much duet as shout at each other."

== Chart positions ==
Chart (2010)	Peak position
Billboard Alternative Songs	20
Billboard Rock Songs	36

== Personnel ==
- Alison Mosshart – guitar, vocals
- Dean Fertita – organ, guitar
- Jack Lawrence – bass
- Jack White – drums, vocals, production
