= Sea of Cowards =

Studio album by The Dead Weather
- Released: May 11, 2010
- Recorded: December 2009
- Studio: Third Man Studio, Nashville, Tennessee
- Genre: Rock; blues rock
- Length: 35:12
- Label: Warner Bros./Third Man
- Producer: Jack White

The Dead Weather chronology
Horehound (2009)	Sea of Cowards (2010)	Dodge and Burn (2015)

Singles from Sea of Cowards
- 1. "Die By The Drop" Released: March 30, 2010; 2. "Blue Blood Blues" Released: June 23, 2010

Professional ratings
Aggregate scores
Source	Rating
Metacritic	70/100
Review scores
Source	Rating
Allmusic	3.5/5 stars
BLARE Magazine	4/5 stars
Entertainment Weekly	(B+)
L.A. Times	3/4 stars
NME	8/10 stars
Pitchfork Media	(7.8/10)
Rolling Stone	3.5/5 stars
Slant Magazine	3.5/5 stars
Spin	4/5 stars

Sea of Cowards is the second studio album by the American alternative rock band the Dead Weather. It was first released on May 7 in Ireland, then on May 11, 2010, in the U.S. and May 10 in the United Kingdom.

The album was streamed on the band's website, via continuous vinyl playback, for a period of 24 hours from April 30 to May 1. It was subsequently available for streaming on various media streaming websites such as National Public Radio and KCRW. The album was rated number 11 on Rolling Stone's list of the 30 Best Albums of 2010.

== Background and release ==
In 2009, the group worked on 15 songs over three days at White's Nashville studio, Third Man Records. They reconvened at the studio in December, and recorded the album in three weeks. The vinyl LP version was pressed at United Record Pressing in Nashville, Tennessee.

On May 3, before the album's release, the band played a special show at White's Third Man Records where Sea Of Cowards was played in its entirety. The show was streamed on MySpace and subsequently appeared on the band's YouTube channel. The performance was released on 12" vinyl through the Third Man Records' Vault subscription service, recorded live to analog tape and pressed directly to vinyl. This is in contrast to the controversial mastering process of the original album.

== Composition ==
According to Billboard magazine, "the grinding blues that drives tracks like 'Hustle and Cuss' and 'Gasoline' take the Dead Weather to a new level of intensity." Brisbane periodical mX identified the song as "a grimy road trip through voodoo blues, garage rock and even metal."

== Reception ==
=== Critical ===
Sea of Cowards received generally favorable reviews, ratings with Metacritic rating of "70." Giving the album a B+, Entertainment Weekly said it was "35 minutes of furious guitar solos and demonic howls." Spin magazine gave the work eight out of ten stars, and said that Mosshart and White "harness this icy alpha-dog tension into a distorted call-and-response aggression that's now greater than its parts, a rudely heavy swath of rock'n'roll authority." Pitchfork rated Sea of Cowards at 7.8 (out of ten), noting that "it's a heavy, snarly, physical rock album, and it feels like the work of people so secure in their ass-kicking abilities that they don't have to sweat the details." Blare magazine remarked that the album "combines the group’s sinister attitude with dreary funk and sex appeal."

=== Commercial ===
The album debuted on Billboard 200 at No. 5, and No. 3 on Top Rock Albums. It has sold 171,000 copies in the US as of September 2015.

== Track listing ==
No.	Title	Writer(s)	Length
1.	"Blue Blood Blues"	Dean Fertita; Jack Lawrence; Jack White	3:22
2.	"Hustle and Cuss"	Lawrence; Alison Mosshart	3:45
3.	"The Difference Between Us"	Mosshart; White	3:36
4.	"I'm Mad"	Fertita; Lawrence; Mosshart; White	3:16
5.	"Die by the Drop"	Fertita; Lawrence; Mosshart	3:30
6.	"I Can't Hear You"	Fertita; Lawrence; Mosshart; White	3:35
7.	"Gasoline"	Fertita; Lawrence; Mosshart; White	2:44
8.	"No Horse"	Fertita; Lawrence; Mosshart; White	2:50
9.	"Looking at the Invisible Man"	Fertita; White	2:42
10.	"Jawbreaker"	Fertita; Lawrence; Mosshart	2:58
11.	"Old Mary"	White	2:52

On CD versions, there is a 36 second instrumental pre-gap track hidden before "Blue Blood Blues".

There are also two additional "bonus" songs pressed on the label of Sea of Cowards vinyl.

== Personnel ==
- Alison Mosshart: lead vocals, maracas, rhythm guitar, synthesizer
- Jack White: drums, vocals, guitar
- Dean Fertita: lead guitar, organ, piano, synthesizer
- Jack Lawrence: bass, drums

== Appearances in the media ==
The album's opening song, "Blue Blood Blues", was featured in the final episode of Season Two of the HBO comedy Eastbound & Down in 2010. The album's song "I Can't Hear You" was featured in the movie Crazy, Stupid, Love and is a playable song in the guitar-themed video game Rocksmith. It also played over the 2019 Giorgio Armani Acqua di Giò Absolu Instinct men’s fragrance ad.

== Charts ==
Chart (2010)	Peak position
Australian Albums (ARIA)	28
Austrian Albums (Ö3 Austria)	24
Belgian Albums (Ultratop Flanders)	27
Belgian Albums (Ultratop Wallonia)	51
Canadian Albums (Billboard)	6
Danish Albums (Hitlisten)	27
French Albums (SNEP)	30
German Albums (Offizielle Top 100)	47
Greek Albums (IFPI)	18
Irish Albums (IRMA)	55
Dutch Albums (Album Top 100)	76
Norwegian Albums (VG-lista)	11
Swiss Albums (Schweizer Hitparade)	19
New Zealand Albums (RMNZ)	13
UK Albums (OCC)	32
US Billboard 200	5
US Top Alternative Albums (Billboard)	2
US Top Rock Albums (Billboard)	3
US Indie Store Album Sales (Billboard)	1
