= Buzzkill(er) =

Single by The Dead Weather

from the album Dodge and Burn
- B-side: "It's Just Too Bad"
- Released: November 4, 2014
- Genre: Alternative rock
- Length: 3:05
- Label: Third Man
- Songwriters: Alison Mosshart, Dean Fertita

The Dead Weather singles chronology
"Open Up (That's Enough)" (2014)	"Buzzkill(er)" (2014)	"I Feel Love (Every Million Miles)" (2015)

"Buzzkill(er)" is a single by the Dead Weather from their third studio album, Dodge and Burn. A short clip of the song was originally posted in July 2014, as part of Third Man Records' Vault subscription series. A full version of the song was released digitally on November 4, 2014, along with another Dead Weather song, "It's Just Too Bad". An extended excerpt of the song was used by Turner Classic Movies to promote its January 2017 broadcast schedule.

== Personnel ==
- Alison Mosshart – vocals
- Dean Fertita – synthesizer, guitar
- Jack Lawrence – bass
- Jack White – drums, percussion

== Critical reception ==
Michelle Geslani described it as "a searing, punchy rocker equipped with enough buzzsaw-like riffs to shred eardrums and speakers alike." Rachel Brodsky said that the song "blasts off hard with a series of bass drum beats and high-pitched guitar squeals".
