= The Dead Weather =

American rock band

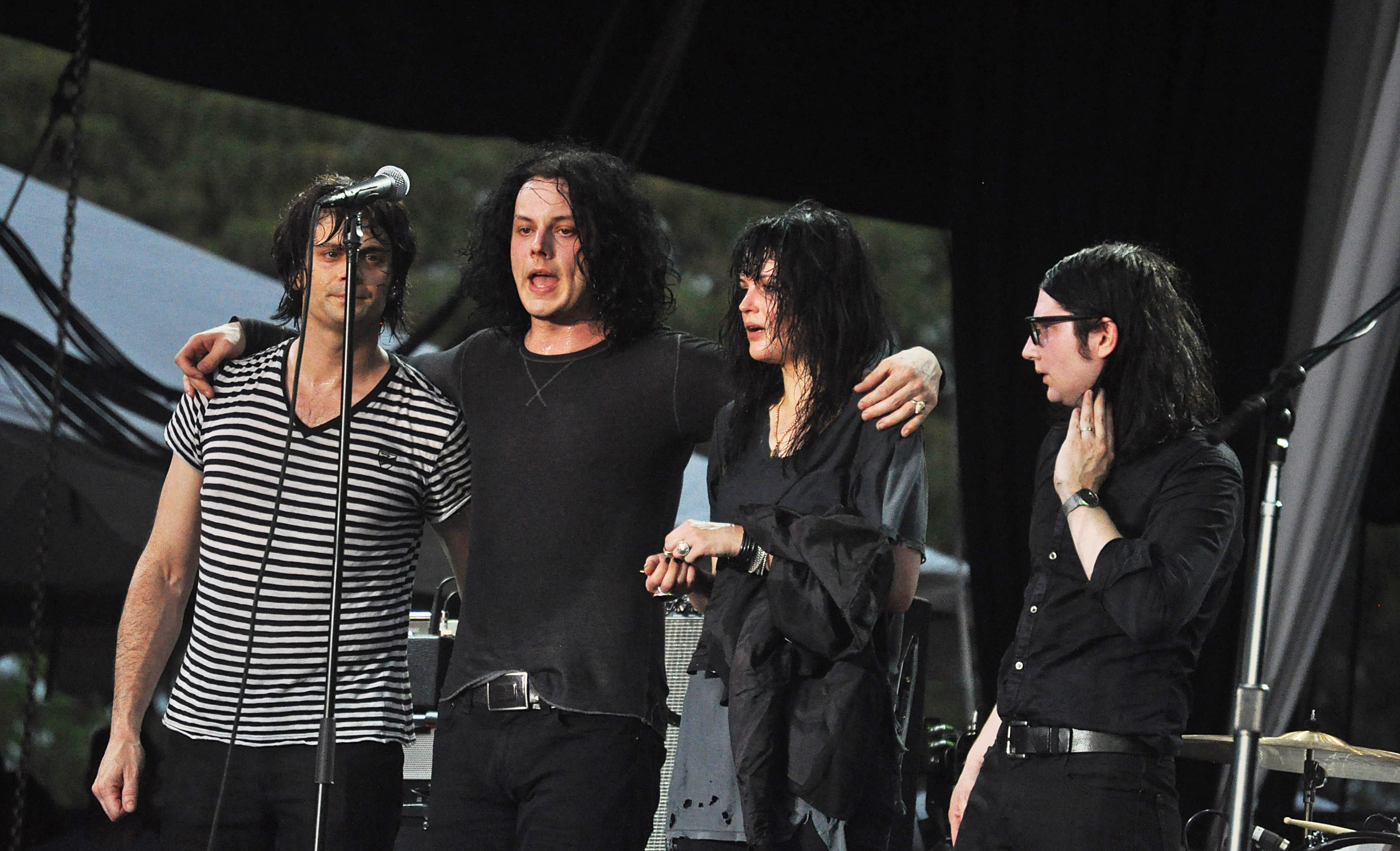
- The Dead Weather in 2009. Left to right: Dean Fertita, Jack White, Alison Mosshart and Jack Lawrence

Background information
- Origin: Nashville, Tennessee, U.S.
- Genres: Blues rock; garage rock; psychedelic rock; alternative rock
- Years active: 2009–2015
- Label: Third Man
- Spinoff of: The Greenhornes; The Kills; Queens of the Stone Age; The Raconteurs; The White Stripes
- Members: Alison Mosshart; Dean Fertita; Jack Lawrence; Jack White
- Website: thedeadweather.com

The Dead Weather is an American rock supergroup formed in Nashville, Tennessee, in 2009. Composed of Alison Mosshart (of the Kills and Discount), Jack White (of the White Stripes and the Raconteurs), Dean Fertita (of Queens of the Stone Age, Karen O and Iggy Pop) and Jack Lawrence (of the Greenhornes, the Raconteurs and Karen O), The Dead Weather debuted at the opening of Third Man Records' Nashville headquarters on March 11, 2009. The band performed live for the first time at the event, immediately before releasing their debut single "Hang You from the Heavens".

The band's second studio album, Sea of Cowards, was released in 2010, followed by Dodge and Burn in September 2015.

== History ==
=== Formation and Horehound (2009) ===
When the Raconteurs were performing in Memphis, Tennessee, Jack White lost his voice and the band asked Alison Mosshart of the Kills with whom they were touring to fill in on some songs. She sang lead vocals on "Steady as She Goes" and "Salute Your Solution". White later asked her if she would record a song with him and Jack Lawrence. They met Dean Fertita at the studio and they ended up performing more than one song that night.

Ultimately they decided to form a band with Mosshart as their lead singer, Lawrence on bass, Fertita on guitar and keyboard and White on drums. White claims he wanted to play the drums in the band, having rediscovered drumming after playing on a kit on "Another Way to Die" with Alicia Keys. He had played drums as a child, and for Goober & the Peas before forming the White Stripes. White said he felt that playing lead guitar in another band would be too redundant and saw it as an opportunity to do something different.

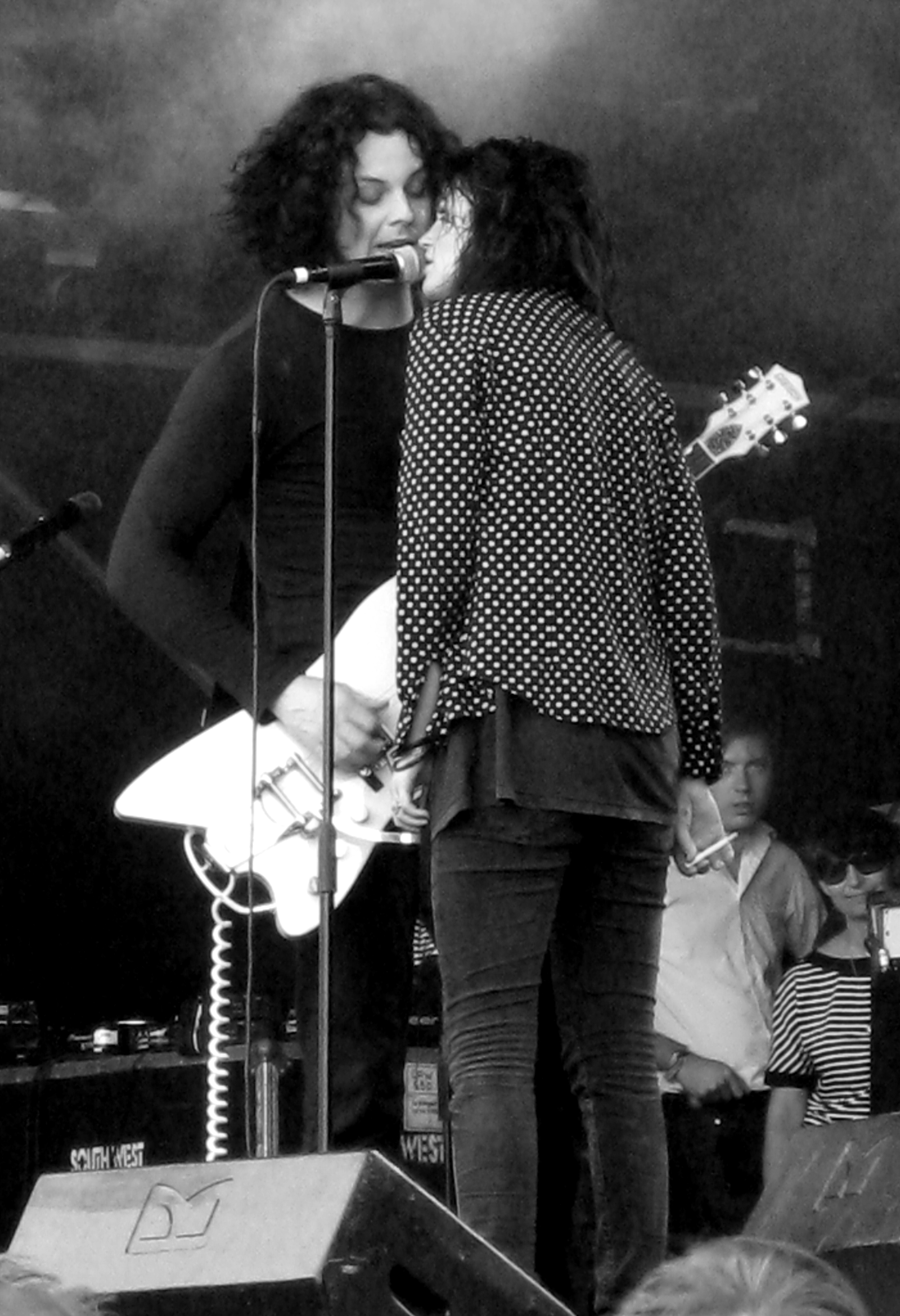
White and Mosshart performing live at the Glastonbury Festival.

In January 2009, Mosshart, Fertita, Lawrence and White got together for an impromptu jam at White's Third Man studio. The session was followed by two and a half weeks of song writing and recording, during which the Dead Weather formed. "Things just started to happen," said White. "We didn't have a direction. We just went a song a day, two songs a day, whatever we could do and recorded them on the fly... There was no time to think about what it was. It just was."

The Dead Weather's debut album, Horehound, was released on July 14, 2009 in North America, and July 13 in Europe. It entered the U.S. Billboard 200 Album Charts at No. 6 and the UK Album Charts at No. 14. Three tracks from Horehound ("No Hassle Night", "Hang You from the Heavens", and "Treat Me Like Your Mother") were made available as downloadable content for the Rock Band video game series on the same day as the North American release.

Jack White co-directed a short documentary about the Dead Weather called "Full Flash Blank". It contains exclusive interviews of the band members and performances of "60 Feet Tall", "I Cut Like A Buffalo", and "Treat Me Like Your Mother". "Full Flash Blank" aired on Channel 4 straight after the showing of "Later... with Jools Holland" which featured the Dead Weather performing their first three singles.

=== Sea of Cowards (2009–2010) ===
On October 16, 2009, Mosshart confirmed that a second album was "halfway done". White later announced that the first single from the new album would be called "Die by the Drop", for which he would sing lead vocals. He commented that it was "bluesier and heavier than we ever thought we could be".

Sea of Cowards was first released on May 7, 2010, in Ireland, and then released on May 10 and 11 in the U.S. and the U.K. respectively. The album peaked at number five on the Billboard 200, and was placed at number eleven on Rolling Stone's thirty greatest albums of 2010 list.

The song "Rolling in on a Burning Tire" appeared on The Twilight Saga: Eclipse movie soundtrack.

=== Dodge and Burn and inactivity (2013–2015) ===
In October 2013, Third Man Records announced the forthcoming release of a limited edition 7-inch vinyl record containing two newly recorded Dead Weather songs. "Open Up (That's Enough)" and its B-side, "Rough Detective," were released exclusively in this format through the label's record subscription service, The Vault. These two tracks were the first pair of songs to be released in vinyl-only physical form through The Vault. "Buzzkill(er)" and "It's Just Too Bad" were released in similar fashion on November 4, 2014. These four songs and eight others would make up the band's third studio album, Dodge and Burn. The songs were recorded from approximately July 2014 to July 2015 when members of the band had the available time or inspiration to record. The third single in advance of the album, "I Feel Love (Every Million Miles)," was made available for download on August 21, 2015. It was released on 7-inch vinyl, backed with "Cop and Go," through The Vault in September 2015.

== Band members ==
- Alison Mosshart – vocals, rhythm guitar, keyboards
- Jack White – drums, vocals, additional guitars
- Dean Fertita – lead guitar, keyboards, backing vocals
- Jack Lawrence – bass guitar, backing vocals, drums
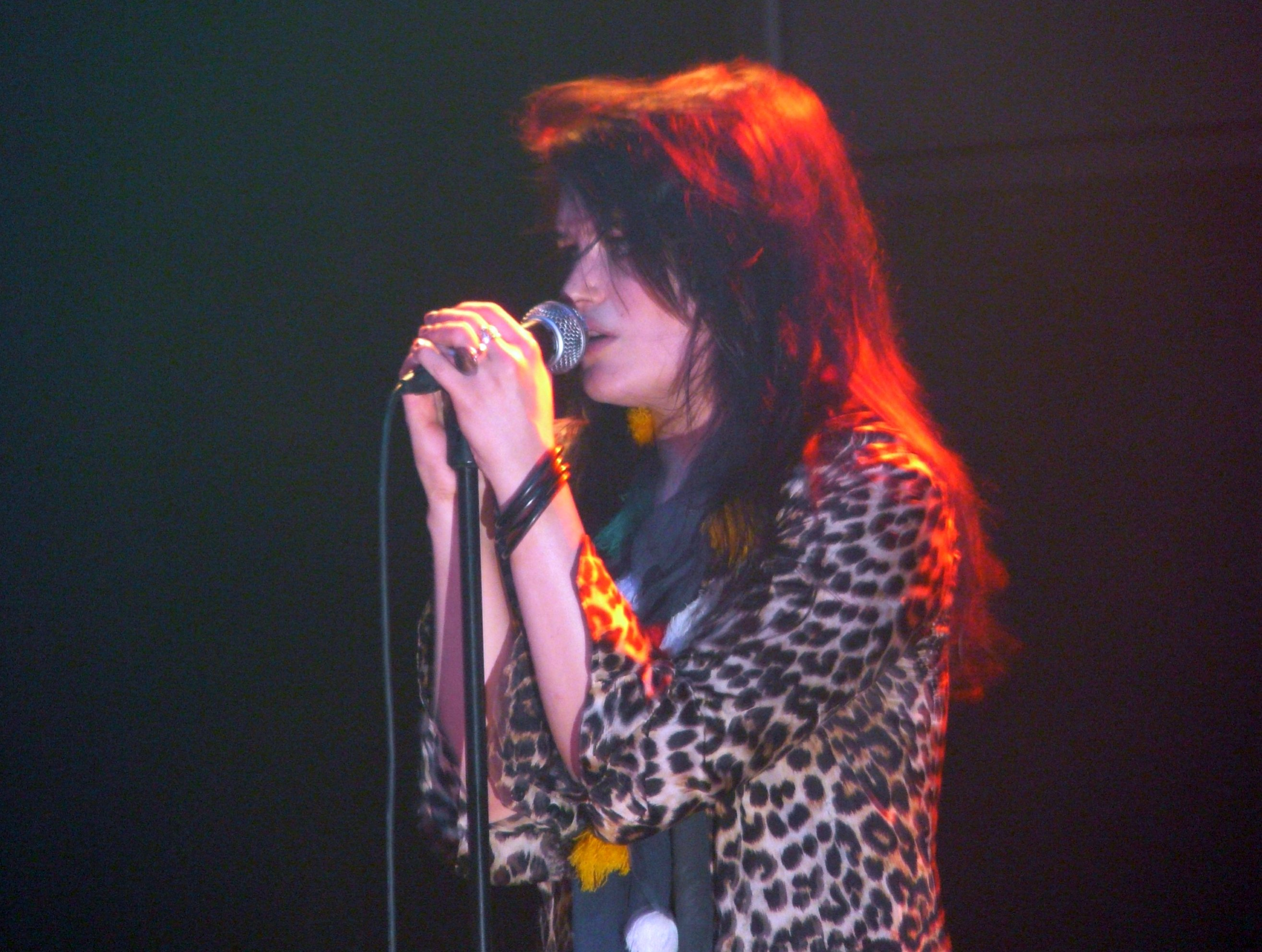
Alison Mosshart of Discount and the Kills.

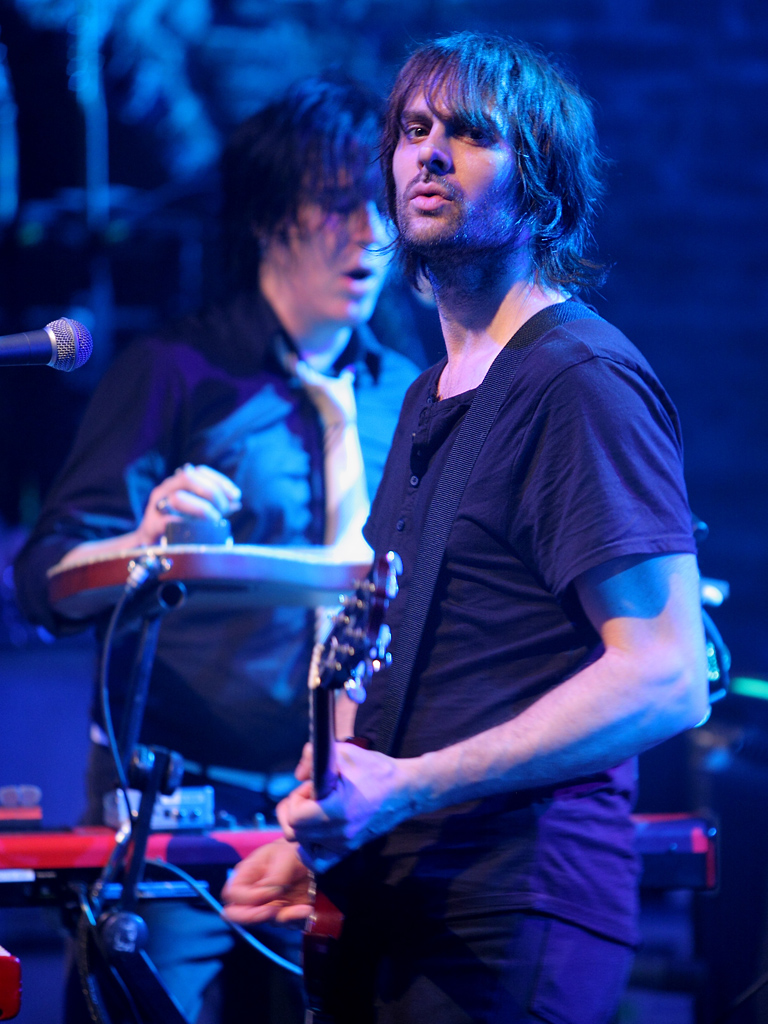
Dean Fertita of Queens of the Stone Age, Iggy Pop and Karen O.

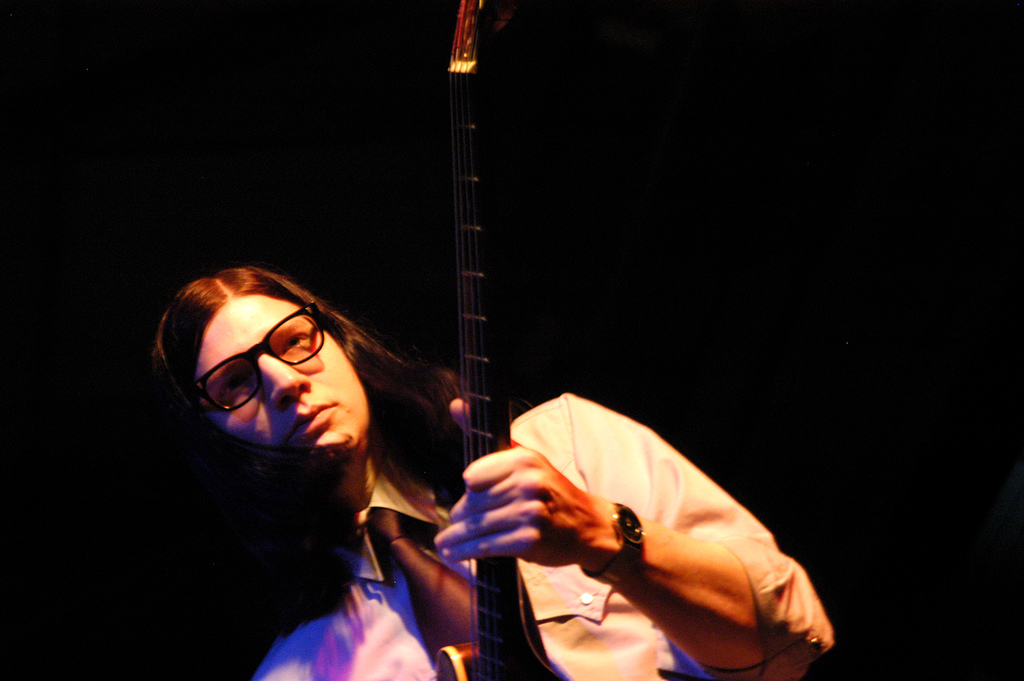
Jack Lawrence of the Raconteurs and Karen O.

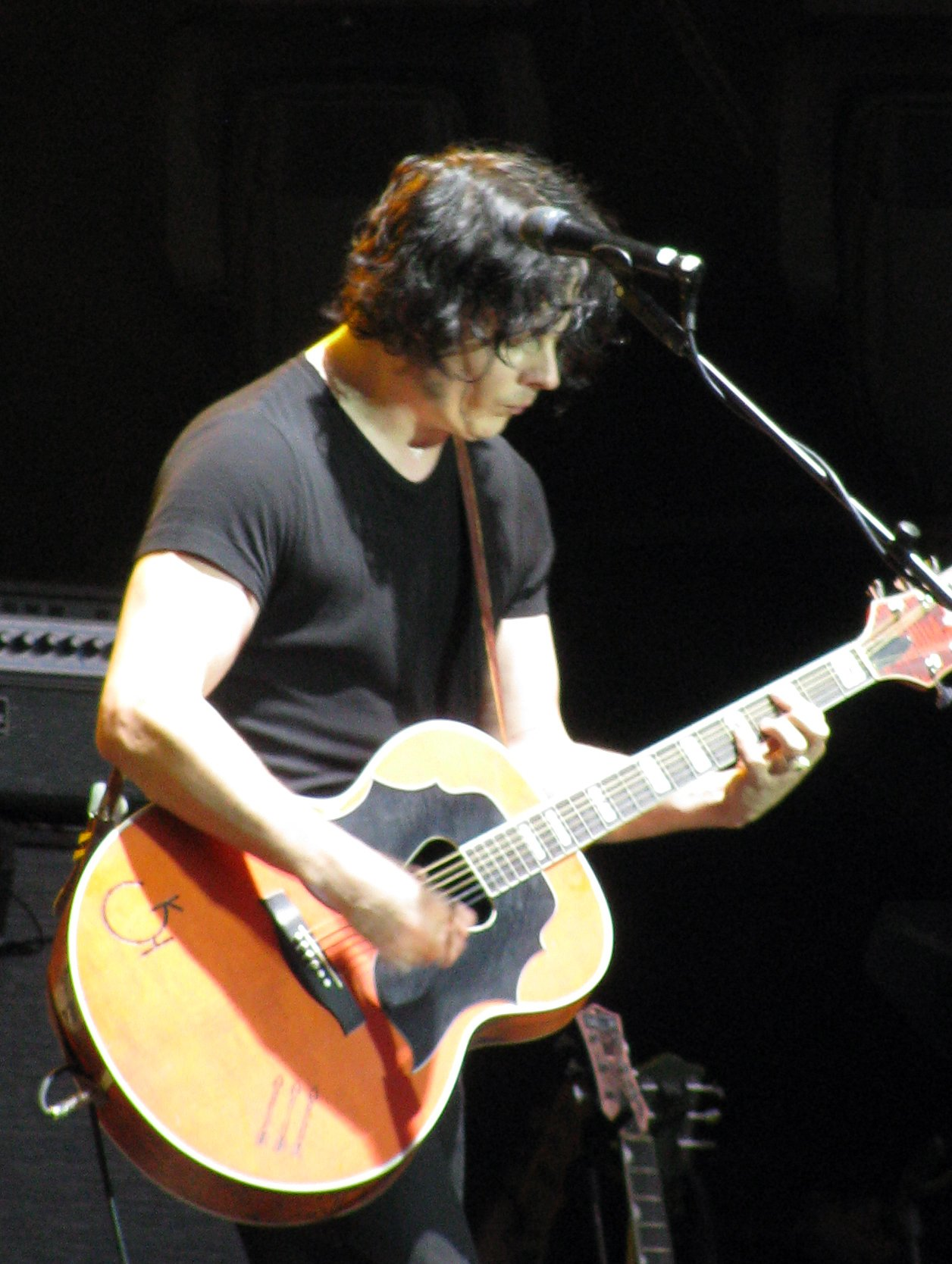
Jack White of the White Stripes and the Raconteurs.

== Discography ==
=== Studio albums ===
| Title | Album details | Peak chart positions | | | | | | | | | | Sales |
| Title | Album details | US | AUS | AUT | CAN | FRA | NL | NOR | NZ | SWI | UK | Sales |
|---|---|---|---|---|---|---|---|---|---|---|---|---|
| Horehound | Release date: July 14, 2009; Label: Third Man; Formats: CD, LP, music download | 6 | 48 | 43 | 7 | 19 | 63 | 26 | 24 | 14 | 14 | US: 163,000 |
| Sea of Cowards | Release date: May 11, 2010; Label: Third Man; Formats: CD, LP, music download | 5 | 28 | 24 | 6 | 30 | 76 | 11 | 13 | 19 | 32 | US: 171,000 |
| Dodge and Burn | Release date: September 25, 2015; Label: Third Man; Formats: CD, LP, music download | 10 | 21 | 28 | 16 | 47 | 25 | 14 | 32 | 15 | 21 | |

=== Live albums ===
| Title | Album details |
|---|---|
| Live at Third Man Records West | Release date: October 30, 2009; Label: Reprise; Formats: Digital Download |

=== Singles ===
| Title | Year | Peak chart positions | | | | | | | | | | Album |
| Title | Year | US Alt | US Rock | BEL | CAN Rock | CZ Rock | MEX | POL | SCO | UK | UK Rock | Album |
|---|---|---|---|---|---|---|---|---|---|---|---|---|
| "Hang You from the Heavens" | 2009 | — | — | — | — | — | 33 | — | — | — | — | Horehound |
| "Treat Me Like Your Mother" | 2009 | 40 | — | — | — | 18 | 16 | — | 21 | 168 | — | Horehound |
| "I Cut Like a Buffalo" | 2009 | — | — | — | — | 15 | 16 | — | — | — (Note: "I Cut Like a Buffalo" did not enter the UK Singles Chart, but peaked at number 41 on the UK Physical Singles Chart.) | — | Horehound |
| "Die by the Drop" | 2010 | 20 | 36 | — | 30 | — | 15 | — | — | 154 | 24 | Sea of Cowards |
| "Blue Blood Blues" | 2010 | — | — | — | — | — | — | — | — | — | — | Sea of Cowards |
| "Open Up (That's Enough)" / "Rough Detective" | 2013 | — | — | — | — | 7 | 43 | — | — | — | — | Dodge and Burn |
| "Buzzkill(er)" / "It's Just Too Bad" | 2014 | — | — | — | — | 14 | 37 | — | — | — | — | Dodge and Burn |
| "I Feel Love (Every Million Miles)" / "Cop and Go" | 2015 | 27 | — (Note: "I Feel Love (Every Million Miles)" did not enter the Hot Rock & Alternative Songs chart, but peaked at number 47 on the Rock & Alternative Airplay chart.) | 55 | — | 12 | 35 | 47 | — | — | — | Dodge and Burn |
| "Impossible Winner" / "Mile Markers" | 2015 | — | — | — | — | — | 42 | — | — | — | — | Dodge and Burn |
| "Let Me Through" / "Be Still" | 2016 | — | — | — | — | — | — | — | — | — | — | Dodge and Burn |
| "Three Dollar Hat" / "Lose the Right" | 2017 | — | — | — | — | — | — | — | — | — | — | Dodge and Burn |
"—" denotes releases that did not chart

=== Music videos ===
| Year | Song | Director |
|---|---|---|
| 2009 | "Hang You from the Heavens" | David Swanson |
| 2009 | "Treat Me Like Your Mother" | Jonathan Glazer |
| 2009 | "I Cut Like a Buffalo" | Jack White |
| 2009 | "Will There Be Enough Water?" | David Swanson |
| 2010 | "Die by the Drop" | Floria Sigismondi |
| 2010 | "Blue Blood Blues" | Christopher Mills & Tim Wheeler |
| 2015 | "I Feel Love (Every Million Miles)" | Ian & Copper |
| 2016 | "Impossible Winner" | Sophie Muller & Ross McDowell |
