= I Feel Love (Every Million Miles) =

Single by The Dead Weather

from the album Dodge and Burn
- B-side: "Cop and Go"
- Released: August 17, 2015
- Genre: Alternative rock, blues rock
- Length: 3:16
- Label: Third Man
- Songwriters: Alison Mosshart, Dean Fertita
- Producer: Jack White

The Dead Weather singles chronology
"Buzzkill(er)" (2014)	"I Feel Love (Every Million Miles)" (2015)

"I Feel Love (Every Million Miles)" is a single by the Dead Weather from their third studio album, Dodge and Burn. The song was first released on the streaming service Tidal, but was made available to download when pre-ordering the album on August 21. "I Feel Love (Every Million Miles)" and its B-side "Cop and Go" were released exclusively in physical format through Third Man Records' subscription service The Vault as a 7-inch vinyl single in September 2015.

The music video for the "I Feel Love (Every Million Miles)" was nominated for the 2016 Grammy Award for Best Music Video.

== Personnel ==
- Alison Mosshart – vocals
- Dean Fertita – guitar
- Jack Lawrence – bass
- Jack White – drums
