= Hang You from the Heavens =

Single by The Dead Weather

from the album Horehound
- B-side: "Are Friends Electric?" (Gary Numan cover)
- Released: March 11, 2009
- Recorded: January 2009 at Third Man Studio
- Genre: Alternative rock, garage rock
- Length: 3:39
- Label: Third Man
- Songwriters: Alison Mosshart, Dean Fertita
- Producer: Jack White

The Dead Weather singles chronology
"Hang You from the Heavens" (2009)	"Treat Me Like Your Mother" (2009)

"Hang You from the Heavens" is the debut single by American alternative rock band the Dead Weather. It was released on March 11, 2009 and was backed with a cover of Gary Numan's "Are 'Friends' Electric?". The single was released through iTunes and on a 7" vinyl limited to 150 copies, all of which were given to the crowd at the band's debut performance at the opening of the Third Man Records headquarters. The 7" was later released through their website, and in record stores.

The song was released as downloadable content for the Rock Band series on July 14, 2009 along with "No Hassle Night" and "Treat Me Like Your Mother".

In the fall of 2009, the song was featured in TV spots to promote the premiere of The Vampire Diaries, an American television series that aired on The CW.

== Track listing ==
No.	Title	Writer(s)	Length
1.	"Hang You from the Heavens"	Dean Fertita/Alison Mosshart	3:39
2.	"Are 'Friends' Electric?"	Gary Numan	4:24
Total length:			8:03

== Music video ==
A low budget music video was made in promotion of the single. The video was shot entirely in black and white and features the band members sitting inside of a photo booth in various sequence and combination. The band are all wearing black leather jackets and bring in various objects and clothes into the booth. One object brought in multiple times is a piece of cardboard with a circular hole which each member brings in at a certain point and stares into.

There are two primary camera angles used during the video. The first angle comes from just outside the booth and oversees the members' entrance into the booth. The other angle comes from inside the booth, filming the member in front of a curtain. The first angle is used exclusively until 2:27 when the second angle becomes used exclusively.

== Personnel ==
- Alison Mosshart – vocals
- Dean Fertita – guitar
- Jack Lawrence – bass
- Jack White – drums, vocals, production

== Chart performance ==
Chart (2009)	Peak position
U.S. Billboard Hot Single Sales	8
