= League of Kitchens =

American for-profit cooking organisation

The League of Kitchens is a culturally immersive cooking school in New York City, New York, and online, where immigrant women, who are experienced home cooks, teach their family recipes to small groups of students in their own kitchens. The classes seek to build cross-cultural connections and teach traditional cooking knowledge.

The League of Kitchens Cookbook: Brilliant Tips, Secret Methods & Favorite Family Recipes from Around the World was published in November 2024 by Harvest, an imprint of William Morrow.

== Background ==
Brooklyn-based Lisa Kyung Gross is the founder and CEO of the organization. She explained the hiring process as; "we're not just hiring people who are good cooks. We're hiring people who have a deep knowledge of their culinary tradition, and who are warm hosts and willing to host groups of Americans in their homes." Gross also recounted how she wished to create the organization after the realization she had missed the opportunity to preserve the recipes and techniques of her Korean grandmothers cooking.

== Structure ==
The organization offers lessons taught in the homes of the female instructors, with up to six students to learn about the cuisine from Mexico, Indonesia, Bangladesh, Burkina Faso, Ukraine, Greece, Afghanistan, India, Argentina, Japan, Nepal, and Uzbekistan. The students learn how to cook the traditional food of the women, and learn about the culture before they eat the food that they have prepared.
