= Dodge and Burn =

Studio album by The Dead Weather
- Released: September 25, 2015
- Recorded: 2013–2015
- Studio: Third Man Studio, Nashville, Tennessee
- Genre: Garage rock, alternative rock, hard rock
- Length: 42:44
- Label: Third Man
- Producer: Jack White

The Dead Weather chronology
Sea of Cowards (2010)	Dodge and Burn (2015)

Singles from Dodge and Burn
- 1. "Open Up (That's Enough)" Released: January 14, 2014; 2. "Buzzkill(er)" Released: November 4, 2014; 3. "I Feel Love (Every Million Miles)" Released: August 17, 2015; 4. "Impossible Winner" Released: 2016

Professional ratings
Aggregate scores
Source	Rating
Metacritic	75/100
Review scores
Source	Rating
AllMusic	4/5 stars
American Songwriter	4/5 stars
The A.V. Club	B
Clash	8/10
Evening Standard	3/5 stars
The Guardian	3/5 stars
Financial Times	4/5 stars
Pitchfork	7.3/10
Spin	8/10

Dodge and Burn is the third studio album by the American rock band the Dead Weather. It was released worldwide on September 25, 2015, through Third Man Records.

== Background and release ==
In October 2013, Third Man Records announced the forthcoming release of a limited edition 7-inch vinyl record containing two newly recorded Dead Weather songs. "Open Up (That's Enough)" and its B-side, "Rough Detective," were released exclusively in this format through the label's record subscription service, The Vault. These two tracks were the first pair of songs to be released in vinyl-only physical form through The Vault. "Buzzkill(er)" and "It's Just Too Bad" were released in similar fashion on November 4, 2014. These four songs and eight others would make up the band's third studio album, Dodge and Burn. The songs were recorded from approximately July 2014 to July 2015 when members of the band had the available time or inspiration to record. The third single in advance of the album, "I Feel Love (Every Million Miles)," was made available for download on August 21, 2015. It was released on 7-inch vinyl, backed with "Cop and Go," through The Vault in September 2015.

== Track listing ==
No.	Title	Writer(s)	Length
1.	"I Feel Love (Every Million Miles)"	Dean Fertita, Alison Mosshart	3:16
2.	"Buzzkill(er)"	Fertita, Mosshart	3:08
3.	"Let Me Through"	Jack Lawrence, Mosshart, Jack White	4:17
4.	"Three Dollar Hat"	Fertita, Lawrence, Mosshart, White	3:23
5.	"Lose the Right"	Fertita, Lawrence, Mosshart, White	3:18
6.	"Rough Detective"	Fertita, Mosshart, White	3:03
7.	"Open Up (That's Enough)"	Mosshart, White	3:50
8.	"Be Still"	Fertita, Lawrence, Mosshart, White	2:48
9.	"Mile Markers"	Fertita, Lawrence, Mosshart, White	3:46
10.	"Cop and Go"	Fertita, Mosshart, White	4:07
11.	"It's Just Too Bad"	Fertita, Mosshart	3:47
12.	"Impossible Winner"	Mosshart	4:00

== Personnel ==
The Dead Weather

- Alison Mosshart – vocals
- Jack Lawrence – bass, backing vocals
- Jack White – drums, vocals (tracks 4, 6, 7), guitar (track 7), cowbell (track 10), percussion (track 11), production, mixing
- Dean Fertita – guitar, keyboards, backing vocals; piano (tracks 9, 10, 12), sequencing

Additional musicians

- Joshua V. Smith – cowbell
- Katelyn Westergard – violin
- Kristin Weber – violin
- Elizabeth Lamb – viola
- Cara Fox – cello

Additional personnel

- Joshua V. Smith – engineering, mixing
- Vance Powell – engineering
- John Hampton – engineering
- Mindy Watts – assistant recording engineer
- Lydia Gilman – assistant recording engineer
- Dusy Fairchild – assistant recording engineer, mixing engineer
- Lars Fox – additional editing
- Brooke Waggoner – string quartet arrangement (track 12)
- Bob Ludwig – mastering

== Charts ==
Chart (2015)	Peak position
Australian Albums (ARIA)	21
Austrian Albums (Ö3 Austria)	28
Belgian Albums (Ultratop Flanders)	17
Belgian Albums (Ultratop Wallonia)	34
Canadian Albums (Billboard)	16
Dutch Albums (Album Top 100)	25
French Albums (SNEP)	47
German Albums (Offizielle Top 100)	57
Irish Albums (IRMA)	32
New Zealand Albums (RMNZ)	32
Norwegian Albums (VG-lista)	14
Swiss Albums (Schweizer Hitparade)	15
UK Albums (OCC)	21
US Billboard 200	10
US Top Alternative Albums (Billboard)	2
US Independent Albums (Billboard)	1
US Top Rock Albums (Billboard)	2
