= The Kills discography =

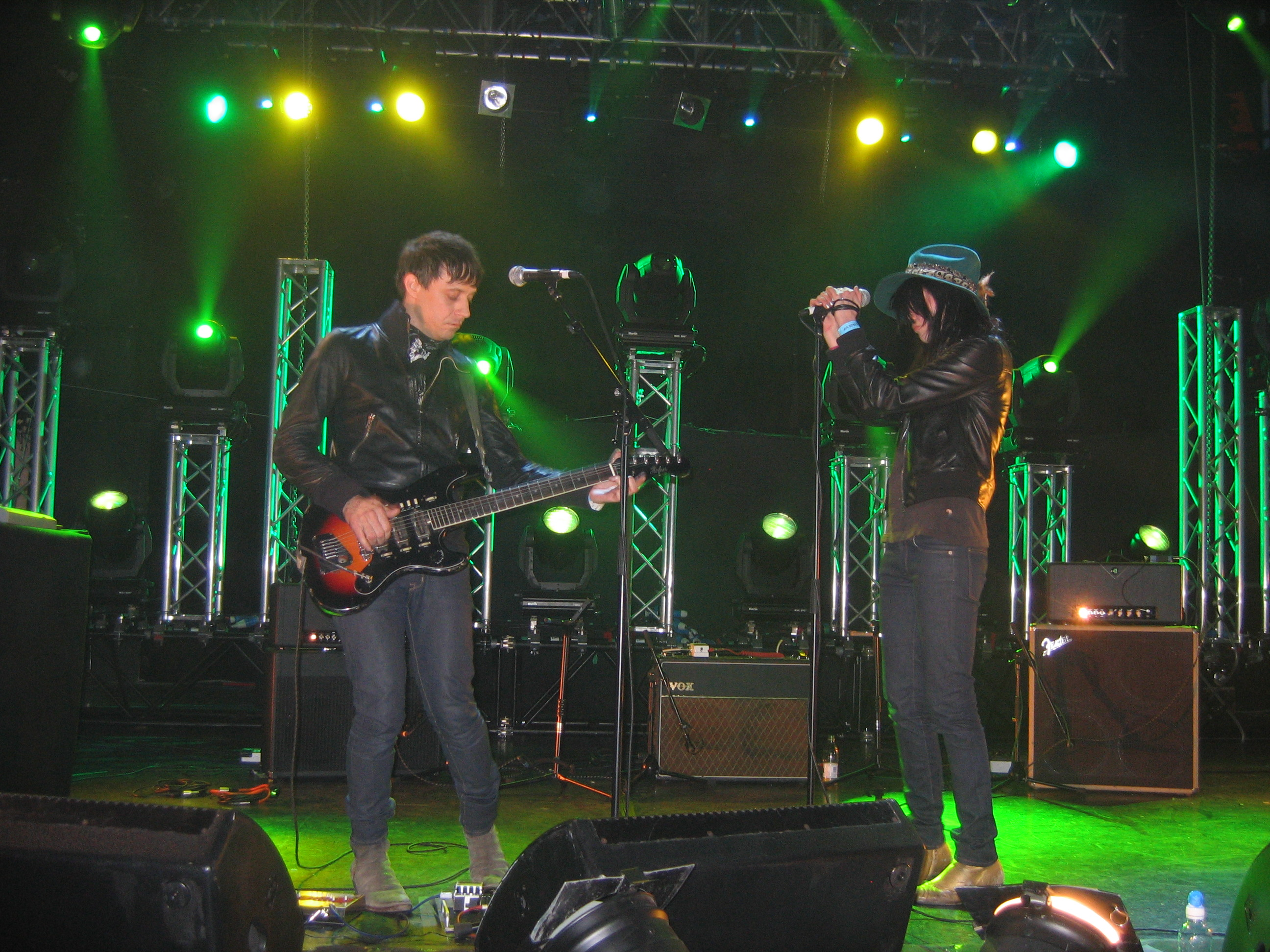
- The Kills live at Koko in London, February 25, 2008
- Studio albums: 6
- Extended plays: 4
- Live albums: 1
- Singles: 21
- Video albums: 1
- Music videos: 16
- Compilation contributions: 2

The Kills are an English-American indie rock band formed by American vocalist Alison Mosshart and British guitarist Jamie Hince. Since 2002, The Kills have released six studio albums, four extended plays, 21 singles, 16 music videos, a documentary, and have contributed original material to two compilations. The Kills debuted in 2002 with the Black Rooster EP, released on Domino Records. The duo's debut full-length album, Keep on Your Mean Side, was released the following year. The album peaked at number 47 on the United Kingdom Albums Chart, while the single "Fried My Little Brains" peaked at number 55 on the UK Singles Chart. The Kills followed up with No Wow in 2005 and Midnight Boom in 2008. No Wow was the first of the group's releases to chart in the United States, peaking at number 18 on the Billboard "Top Heatseekers" chart. No Wow also charted in the UK, Belgium, France, and the Netherlands. The group's third album, Midnight Boom charted in a total of nine countries, including the album's first appearance on the Billboard 200 at number 133. Between The Kills' 21 singles, five have charted in the United Kingdom. A tour documentary titled I Hate the Way You Love was included with a limited number of copies of No Wow.

== Albums ==
=== Studio albums ===
Title	Album details	Peak chart positions									
Title	Album details	UK	US	AUS	AUT	BEL (FL)	FRA	GER	NLD	SCO	SWI
Keep on Your Mean Side	Released: 1 April 2003; Label: Rough Trade; Formats: CD, LP	47	—	—	—	—	75	—	—	40	—
No Wow	Released: 8 March 2005; Label: RCA, Rough Trade; Formats: CD, LP; Early copies included documentary I Hate the Way You Love.	56	— (Note: No Wow did not enter the US Billboard 200, but peaked at number 18 on the US Heatseekers Albums Chart.)	—	—	28	22	—	96	49	—
Midnight Boom	Released: 18 March 2008; Label: Domino; Formats: CD, LP	47	133	— (Note: Midnight Boom did not enter the Australian ARIA Albums Chart but peaked at number 11 on the ARIA Hitseekers Chart.)	66	13	23	—	68	52	56
Blood Pressures	Released: 5 April 2011; Label: Domino; Formats: CD, LP	40	37	43	31	16	8	33	38	36	16
Ash & Ice	Released: 3 June 2016; Label: Domino; Formats: CD, 2×LP, digital download	18	45	21	15	25	11	25	51	12	14
God Games	Released: 27 October 2023; Label: Domino; Formats: CD, LP, digital download	66	— (Note: God Games did not enter the US Billboard 200, but peaked at number 49 on the US Top Album Sales Chart.)	—	39	139	46	31	—	16	70
"—" denotes releases that did not chart.

=== Live albums ===
Title	Album details	Peak chart positions
Title	Album details	US Indie
Live at Third Man Records	Released: 25 June 2013; Recorded: 10 October 2012; Label: Third Man (#188); Formats: 12-inch LP	—
Live at Electric Lady Studios	Released: 21 April 2018; Recorded: 14 February 2017; Label: Electric Lady (#002); Formats: 12-inch LP; Limited RSD 2018 Release (2700 copies)	40

=== Compilation albums ===
Title	Album details	Peak chart positions		
Title	Album details	UK Indie	US Sales	FRA
Little Bastards	Released: 11 December 2020; Label: Domino; Formats: CD, digital	38	51	140

== Extended plays ==
Title	Album details	Peak chart positions	
Title	Album details	UK Sales	US Heat
Black Rooster EP	Released: 28 May 2002; Label: Domino (#144); Formats: CD, 12-inch EP	14	—
Fried My Little Brains	Released: 2003; Label: Domino; Formats: CD, 10-inch EP, 7-inch EP	—	—
Run Home Slow	Released: 2005; Label: Rough Trade; Formats: CD; Released only in the United States	—	—
Live Session EP (iTunes Exclusive)	Released: 20 January 2009; Label: Domino; Formats: digital	—	39
The Last Goodbye	Released: 2011; Label: Domino; Formats: CD, 10-inch EP, 7-inch EP	10	—
Echo Home Non-Electric EP	Released: 2017; Label: Domino; Formats: 10-inch EP, digital	64	—
"—" denotes a recording that did not chart or was not released in that territory.

== Singles ==
Title	Year	Peak chart positions										Album
Title	Year	UK	UK Indie	US Dance	AUS Hit.	BEL (WA) Tip	CZ Rock	FRA	MEX	SCO	SPA	Album
"Fuck the People"	2003	—	—	—	—	—	—	—	—	—	—	Keep on Your Mean Side
"Fried My Little Brains"	2003	55	5	—	—	—	—	—	—	58	—	Keep on Your Mean Side
"Pull a U"	2003	80	17	—	—	—	—	—	—	—	—	Keep on Your Mean Side
"The Good Ones"	2005	23	2	—	—	—	—	—	—	26	—	No Wow
"Love Is a Deserter"	2005	44	4	—	—	—	—	—	—	37	—	No Wow
"No Wow"	2006	53	7	—	—	—	—	—	—	47	—	No Wow
"U.R.A. Fever"	2008	— (Note: "U.R.A. Fever" did not enter the UK Singles Chart, but peaked at number 46 on the UK Physical Chart.)	5	—	—	—	—	—	—	38	—	Midnight Boom
"Cheap and Cheerful"	2008	—	40	—	—	—	—	—	—	—	—	Midnight Boom
"Last Day of Magic"	2008	— (Note: "Last Day of Magic" did not enter the UK Singles Chart, but peaked at number 53 on the UK Physical Chart.)	6	—	—	—	—	—	—	92	—	Midnight Boom
"Tape Song"	2008	— (Note: "Tape Song" did not enter the UK Singles Chart, but peaked at number 61 on the UK Physical Chart.)	5	—	—	—	—	81	—	46	—	Midnight Boom
"Black Balloon"	2009	— (Note: "Black Balloon" did not enter the UK Singles Chart, but peaked at number 57 on the UK Physical Chart.)	13	—	—	—	—	74	—	40	—	Midnight Boom
"Willow Weep for Me"	2009	—	—	—	—	—	—	—	—	—	—	His Way, Our Way
"Satellite"	2011	— (Note: "Satellite" did not enter the UK Singles Chart, but peaked at number 28 on the UK Physical Chart.)	—	10	18	33	13	—	30	—	—	Blood Pressures
"Future Starts Slow"	2011	— (Note: "Future Starts Slow" did not enter the UK Singles Chart, but peaked at number 16 on the UK Physical Chart.)	—	—	15	27	—	—	34	—	—	Blood Pressures
"Baby Says"	2011	— (Note: "Baby Says" did not enter the UK Singles Chart, but peaked at number 27 on the UK Physical Chart.)	—	—	—	—	—	—	—	—	—	Blood Pressures
"The Last Goodbye"	2012	— (Note: "The Last Goodbye" did not enter the UK Singles Chart, but peaked at number ten on the UK Physical Chart.)	—	—	—	—	—	—	47	—	45	Blood Pressures
"Doing It to Death"	2016	—	—	—	—	—	13	—	37	—	—	Ash & Ice
"Heart of a Dog"	2016	—	—	—	—	—	—	—	41	—	—	Ash & Ice
"Siberian Nights"	2016	—	—	—	—	—	—	—	—	—	—	Ash & Ice
"List of Demands (Reparations)"	2018	— (Note: "List of Demands (Reparations)" did not enter the UK Singles Chart, but peaked at number one on the UK Physical Chart.)	—	—	—	—	—	—	—	—	—	Non-album single
"New York" / "LA Hex"	2023	— (Note: "New York" did not enter the UK Singles Chart, but peaked at number five on the UK Physical Chart.)	—	—	—	—	—	—	—	—	—	God Games
"—" denotes a recording that did not chart or was not released in that territory.

== Music videos ==
Year	Title	Director(s)
2003	"Fried My Little Brains"	Grant Gee
2005	"Kissy Kissy"	Morgan Lebus
2005	"The Good Ones"	Rojo
2005	"Love is a Deserter"	Mark Davis
2005	"No Wow"	Kenneth Cappello
2007	"U.R.A. Fever"	Sophie Muller
2008	"Cheap and Cheerful"	Sophie Muller
2008	"Last Day of Magic"	Sophie Muller
2008	"Tape Song"	Jamie Hince and Alison Mosshart
2009	"Black Balloon"	Kenneth Cappello
2011	"Satellite"	Sophie Muller
2011	"Future Starts Slow"	Philip Andelman
2011	"Baby Says"	Ben Crook
2012	"The Last Goodbye"	Samantha Morton
2012	"Wild Charms"	Kenneth Cappello
2016	"Doing It to Death"	Wendy Morgan
2016	"Heart Of A Dog"	Sophie Muller
2016	"Siberian Nights"	Giovanni Ribisi
2016	"Impossible Tracks"	Ellis Bahl
2018	"List of Demands (Reparations)"	Ben Strebel
2020	"Raise Me" (Demo)	Jamie Hince and Alison Mosshart
2020	"I Put A Spell On You"	unknown
2020	"Passion is Accurate"	unknown
2020	"Blue Moon"	Jamie Hince
2020	"Weed Killer"	Sally Walker Hudecki
2021	"The Search For Cherry Red"	Chris Steyer, unknown
2023	"LA Hex"	Andrew Theodore Balasia
2023	"New York"	Andrew Theodore Balasia
2023	"103"	Steven Sebring
2023	"Wasterpiece"	Noel Paul

== Original contributions to compilations ==
Year	Track	Compilation	Label
2002	"Restaurant Blouse"^{[A]}	If the Twenty-First Century Didn't Exist It Would be Necessary Be Invent It	5 Rue Christine
2006	"I Call It Art"	Monsieur Gainsbourg Revisited	Virgin/Verve Forecast

A Credited as "VV and Hotel"
