= Future Starts Slow =

2011 single by The Kills

Single by The Kills

from the album Blood Pressures
- B-side: "Blue Moon"
- Released: June 27, 2011
- Recorded: 2010
- Genre: Indie rock, garage rock, lo-fi
- Label: Domino
- Songwriter: The Kills
- Producer: Jamie Hince

The Kills singles chronology
| "Satellite" (2011) | "Future Starts Slow" (2011) | "Baby Says" (2011) |

"Future Starts Slow" is the second single from indie rock band The Kills' fourth studio album, Blood Pressures (2011). It was released on June 27, 2011 through the independent label Domino.

A music video for the song, following the band on their travels around, was directed by Philip Andelman and released on June 20, 2011.

== Track listing ==
All tracks are written by The Kills.

| No. | Title | Length |
|---|---|---|
| 1. | "Future Starts Slow" | 4:08 |
| 2. | "Blue Moon" | 3:00 |

== Personnel ==
- Alison "VV" Mosshart – vocals, photography [of Jamie Hince]
- Jamie "Hotel" Hince – drums, guitar, production, photography [of Alison Mosshart]
- Bill Skibbe – co-production

== Charts ==
| Chart (2011) | Peak position |
|---|---|
| Belgium (Ultratip Bubbling Under Wallonia) | 27 |

== In popular culture ==
The song was used as the opening theme for the American TV miniseries Political Animals (2012), starring Sigourney Weaver. It was also featured in episodes of Altered Carbon; the closing scenes of "Relevance", a 2013 episode ofPerson of Interest; The Vampire Diaries; Walker Independence; and Kaos.
