= Fried My Little Brains =

2003 single by The Kills

Single by The Kills

from the album Keep on Your Mean Side
- B-side: "Jewel Thief"
- Released: 14 April 2003
- Recorded: November 2002 at Toe Rag Studios, London
- Genre: Indie rock, garage rock, post-punk revival, lo-fi
- Length: 2:08
- Label: Domino
- Songwriter(s): The Kills

The Kills singles chronology
"Fuck the People" (2003)	"Fried My Little Brains" (2003)	"Pull A U" (2003)

Fried My Little Brains is the second single of UK based Indie rock band The Kills' debut album Keep on Your Mean Side and it peaked at number 55 in the UK Singles Chart.

== Track listing ==
No.	Title	Length
1.	"Fried My Little Brains"	2:08
2.	"Jewel Thief"	2:49
3.	"Sugar Baby" (Dock Boggs)	4:21

== Personnel ==
- Alison "VV" Mosshart – Lead vocals, guitar
- Jamie "Hotel" Hince – Guitar, Drum machine

== Charts ==
Chart (2011)	Peak position
UK Singles Chart	55.
