= Tape Song =

Single by The Kills

from the album Midnight Boom
- B-side: "London Hates You"
- Released: November 16, 2008
- Recorded: 2007
- Genre: Indie rock, garage rock, lo-fi
- Length: 3:41
- Label: Domino
- Songwriter: The Kills
- Producer: The Kills

The Kills singles chronology
"Last Day of Magic" (2008)	"Tape Song" (2008)	"Black Balloon" (2009)

"Tape Song" is the fourth single from indie rock band The Kills' third full-length album, Midnight Boom. It was released on November 16, 2008.

== Music video ==
A video for "Tape Song" was released on November 3, 2008. It features footage taken by the band while they were on tour in the US with The Raconteurs.

== Track listing ==
All tracks are written by The Kills.

No.	Title	Length
1.	"Tape Song"	3:42
2.	"London Hates You"	3:37

== Personnel ==
The Kills

- Alison "VV" Mosshart - vocals
- Jamie "Hotel" Hince - drums, guitar

Technical personnel

- The Kills – production, artwork, layout
- Bill Skibbe – engineering
- Jason Lader – engineering
- Jessica Ruffins – engineering (track 1)
- Andy Taub – engineering (track 2)
- Tom Elmhirst – mixing
- Nilesh Patel – mastering
- XXXchange – additional production (track 2)

== Charts ==
Chart (2009)	Peak position
France (SNEP)	81
