= Blood Pressures =

Studio album by the Kills
- Released: April 1, 2011
- Studios: Key Club Recording Company, MI unspecified studio in London, UK
- Genre: Indie rock
- Length: 41:54
- Label: Domino
- Producers: Jamie Hince; Bill Skibbe

The Kills chronology
Midnight Boom (2008)	Blood Pressures (2011)	Ash & Ice (2016)

Singles from Blood Pressures
- 1. "Satellite" Released: January 31, 2011; 2. "Future Starts Slow" Released: June 27, 2011; 3. "Baby Says" Released: October 24, 2011; 4. "The Last Goodbye" Released: February 13, 2012

Blood Pressures is the fourth studio album by indie rock band the Kills. It was released on April 1, 2011 in Australia, on April 4, 2011 in Europe, and on April 5, 2011 in the United States and Canada. The album was recorded at Key Club studio in Benton Harbor, Michigan, the same studio where the band had previously recorded both No Wow and Midnight Boom. The album was promoted by four singles: "Satellite", "Future Starts Slow", "Baby Says" and "The Last Goodbye".

== Musical style ==
According to Q magazine, while the Midnight Boom album found the duo "moving away from their Suicide/Velvet roots" with hip hop beats and more considered approach, the fourth album "brings another change of gear", driven mostly by Mosshart's recent stint in the Dead Weather.

Jesse Cataldo of Slant Magazine described the Kills's fourth album as "another mostly successful attempt to wrench effective material from a barebones method of hollow attitude and instrumental minimalism". Masters of "a high-wire act" involving "a small bag of tricks shaken up a little differently each time", the Kills "write songs that are invariably concave structures, spacious echo chambers for lurching, fuzzed-out guitar and softly staccato talk-singing", keeping "drawing blood from this stone, readjusting and tweaking their formula", the reviewer expands. According to Cataldo, "Starting with 2005's No Wow, the Kills have produced three almost skeletal meditations on the kind of black-hearted, fatalist sound originally fashioned by artists like Nick Cave. Each has fiddled with the proportions of straightforward stomp and slinky ambience: No Wow was sharp and spindly, ruled by the unsettling tremor of its omnipresent drum machines; Midnight Boom was in some ways a step in an even sparser direction, full of empty spaces and off-kilter melodies; and Blood Pressures pushes back into more forceful territory, leaning on noise and distortion and dropping most pretenses of subtlety."

== Promotion ==
The lead single from the album, "Satellite", was released on iTunes on January 31, 2011, and its video debuted on YouTube on February 9, 2011. It was directed by English director Sophie Muller. The song peaked at number 33 on the Ultratip chart in Belgium (Wallonia region).

"Future Starts Slow" was released as the second single on June 27, 2011. A music video for the song, following the band on their travels around, was directed by Philip Andelman and released on June 20, 2011. The song peaked at number 27 on the Ultratip chart in Wallonia. It was used as an opening theme for the 2012 American miniseries Political Animals, starring Sigourney Weaver. "Future Starts Slow" was also featured in the Person of Interest episode "Relevance".

"Baby Says" was released as a single on October 24, 2011, and a music video for the song, directed by Ben Crook, premiered on October 28, 2011. The fourth single promoting the album, "The Last Goodbye", was released on February 13, 2012. A music video for the song, released on January 18, 2012, was shot in black-and-white and directed by the Academy Award-nominated actress Samantha Morton, debuting in a role of a music video director.

Prior to its release, the album was streaming on the band's website. In addition to official singles, on March 11, 2011 the song "DNA" was made available as a free download to subscribers of the Kills' mailing list.

== Critical reception ==
Professional ratings
Aggregate scores
Source	Rating
Metacritic	76/100
Review scores
Source	Rating
AllMusic	4/5 stars
BBC Music	Positive
Clash	9/10
NME	7/10 stars
Paste	8.6/10
Pitchfork	6.4/10
Rolling Stone	4/5 stars
The Skinny	5/5 stars
Slant Magazine	3/5 stars
Spin	8/10

Blood Pressures received generally positive reviews upon its release. At Metacritic, which assigns a normalized rating out of 100 to reviews from mainstream critics, the album received an average score of 76, based on 32 reviews. At AnyDecentMusic?, which collates reviews of contemporary music albums, the album received an average score of 7.2 (based on 34 professional reviews).

The Skinny magazine's reviewer described it as "a leathery femme fatale massacre," and the band's "most ambitious and accomplished undertaking to date." Simon Harper of Clash magazine, describing the album as "dirty, loud and intimidatingly sexy," argued that it is the result of a year spent apart: "Hince's adventures in sound provide the album's thick production, while Mosshart's stint as Dead Weather frontwoman instils further confidence and swagger in her provocative lyrics."

Rob Fearn of the Q magazine, speaking of "clear signs of progress" in the quality of the band's songwriting and calling the album's first single "Satellite" "an indie anthem in the making" still found some other bids for "maturity" less successful, mentioning "Wild Charms" (with Hince taking lead vocals) and Mosshart's ballad "The Last Goodbye" among less convincing tracks.

== Commercial performance ==
Blood Pressures was the band's first album to reach top 40 chart positions in both the United Kingdom and the United States, as well as in some European countries. In the U.S., it sold 13,000 copies during its first week. The album has sold 73,000 copies in the United States as of April 2016. In 2012 it was awarded a gold certification from the Independent Music Companies Association which indicated sales of at least 75,000 copies throughout Europe.

== Track listing ==
Standard edition
No.	Title	Length
1.	"Future Starts Slow"	4:05
2.	"Satellite"	4:14
3.	"Heart Is a Beating Drum"	4:20
4.	"Nail in My Coffin"	3:32
5.	"Wild Charms"	1:14
6.	"DNA"	4:32
7.	"Baby Says"	4:28
8.	"The Last Goodbye"	3:41
9.	"Damned If She Do"	3:52
10.	"You Don't Own the Road"	3:22
11.	"Pots and Pans"	4:35

Japanese edition bonus tracks

No.	Title	Length
12.	"Willow Weep For Me"	3:07
13.	"Satellite" (Warbler Ariwa)	4:14
14.	"Satellite" (Out Of Orbit Dub)	4:18

== Personnel ==
The Kills

- Alison Mosshart – vocals, guitar
- Jamie Hince – guitar, vocals, mellotron, drums, percussion, production

Technical personnel

- Bill Skibbe – production, engineering
- Jessica Ruffins – engineering

== Charts ==
Chart performance for Blood Pressures
Chart (2011)	Peak position
Australian Albums (ARIA)	43
Austrian Albums (Ö3 Austria)	31
Belgian Albums (Ultratop Flanders)	16
Belgian Albums (Ultratop Wallonia)	29
Canadian Albums (Nielsen SoundScan)	37
Dutch Albums (Album Top 100)	38
Dutch Alternative Albums (Alternative Top 30)	2
French Albums (SNEP)	8
German Albums (Offizielle Top 100)	33
Irish Albums (IRMA)	94
New Zealand Albums (RMNZ)	32
Scottish Albums (Official Charts)	36
Swiss Albums (Schweizer Hitparade)	16
UK Albums (Official Charts)	40
UK Independent Albums (Official Charts)	9
US Billboard 200	37
US Independent Albums (Billboard)	8
US Indie Store Album Sales (Billboard)	3
US Top Alternative Albums (Billboard)	4
US Top Rock Albums (Billboard)	6

== Release history ==
Release dates and formats for Blood Pressures
Region	Date	Label	Format(s)
Australia	April 1, 2011	Domino	CD, digital download
Austria	April 4, 2011	Domino	CD, digital download
France	April 4, 2011	Domino	CD, digital download
Germany	April 4, 2011	Domino	CD, digital download
Ireland	April 4, 2011	Domino	CD, digital download
Sweden	April 4, 2011	Domino	CD, digital download
United Kingdom	April 4, 2011	Domino	CD, digital download
Canada	April 5, 2011	Domino	CD, digital download
United States	April 5, 2011	Domino	CD, digital download
