= Black Rooster (EP) =

Black Rooster EP

EP by The Kills
- Released: 28 May 2002
- Recorded: Toe Rag Studios 25 March 2002
- Genre: Lo-fi
- Length: 18:32
- Label: Domino

The Kills chronology
Black Rooster EP (2002)	Keep on Your Mean Side (2003)

Professional ratings
Review scores
Source	Rating
AllMusic	link
Blender	Link
Drowned in Sound	8/10 link
Pitchfork Media	7.4/10 link
Robert Christgau	link

Black Rooster EP is the debut EP by indie rock band The Kills.

== Background ==
In 2001, the Kills showcased new songs on a demo tape; however, the pair shunned approaches from major record labels. Recording as VV and Hotel, they contributed the song "Restaurant Blouse" to the compilation If the Twenty-First Century Did Not Exist, It Would Be Necessary to Invent It. Shortly after this, they signed to Domino Records and recorded their debut release, the Black Rooster EP in Toe Rag Studios in March 2002; it was all recorded on 8-track by Liam Watson except "Dropout Boogie" which is live at Paint It Black, 4 April 2002 and "Gum", recorded on a Dictaphone by the band. The record sleeve featured photos of Mosshart and Hince taken in a photo booth rather than professional photography.

The record was lo-fi in both musical and aesthetic terms. Musically, the record was a sparse, lo-fi garage rock/blues hybrid though the band cites Captain Beefheart, PJ Harvey, LCD Soundsystem, The Velvet Underground, The Fall, Patti Smith, Suicide and Royal Trux as immediate influences; the music press has largely compared them to The White Stripes.

== Track listing ==
All tracks are written by The Kills, except "Dropout Boogie" written by Don Van Vliet and Herb Bermann

No.	Title	Length
1.	"Cat Claw"	3:31
2.	"Black Rooster (Fuck and Fight)"	4:24
3.	"Wait"	4:48
4.	"Dropout Boogie"	4:27
5.	"Gum (Intermission Red Meat Heart)"	1:22

== Personnel ==
The Kills

- Alison "VV" Mosshart – vocals, guitar on "Wait"
- Jamie "Hotel" Hince – guitar, drums, tambourine, vocals
