= Half Fiction =

Studio album by Discount
- Released: 1997
- Recorded: Recorded at Morrisound Studios, June 1997.
- Genre: Punk rock
- Length: 31:01
- Label: Kat Records

Discount chronology
Ataxia's Alright Tonight (1996)	Half Fiction (1997)	Crash Diagnostic (1999)

Half Fiction is the second studio album by punk band Discount released on kat records in 1997 and is their most notable album.

== Reviews ==
Half Fiction was quite well received and also is their most well known album.

Mike DaRonco said "This has to be heard more than once to be believed. Discount offers some of the most innovative pop-punk ever to come out of Florida: The music isn't too complex to bore the listener, nor is it anything to be labeled as a generic or flat -- it's just straight and to the point. Alison's crisp vocals and poetic lyrics make their second album, Half Fiction, a fantastic effort. Guaranteed that there will be a handful of bands who will want to sound like these guys after hearing this record".

== Track listing ==
No.	Title	Length
1.	"Half Fiction"	1:45
2.	"Clap And Cough"	1:45
3.	"Torn Jeans"	2:46
4.	"Am I Missing Something"	2:07
5.	"City Bleach"	2:33
6.	"Pocket Bomb"	1:43
7.	"Keith"	2:03
8.	"Toxic Home"	2:54
9.	"Soup"	1:30
10.	"The Usual Bed"	2:44
11.	"Dreamt This Was A Castle"	2:45
12.	"On The Counter"	1:52
13.	"Stitch"	2:32
14.	"Is It OK"	2:08

== Personnel ==
- Alison Mosshart - Vocals, Artwork
- Ryan Seagrist - Guitar
- James Parker - Bass
- Bill Nesper - Drums
- Steve Heritage - Recording
- Mitchell Howell - Engineering
