= Crash Diagnostic =

Studio album by Discount
- Released: 8 February 2000
- Genre: Punk rock, post-hardcore
- Length: 33:47
- Label: New American Dream
- Producer: J. Robbins

Discount chronology
Half Fiction (1997)	Crash Diagnostic (2000)

Professional ratings
Review scores
Source	Rating
AllMusic	4/5 stars
Punknews.org	4.5/5 stars
The San Diego Union-Tribune	2.5/4 stars

Crash Diagnostic is the third and final album by punk band Discount. It was released in 2000 on New American Dream.

It has a much heavier edge than Discount's previous two albums. The band split up later that year.

== Critical reception ==
AllMusic called the album "an amazing swan song," writing that "jagged guitars and bizarre timing make the record distinctive, and the sturdy punk backbone remains intact enough to give the energetic tracks a pummeling core." Spin wrote that "Discount bust out ... with punky power-pop songs and untempered female angst." CMJ New Music Report wrote that "with head-boppin' melodies, Discount puts the punk back into the spunky girl rock genre." Billboard wrote: "More female-friendly power pop than hardcore, [Crash Diagnostic] effectively uses the formula of raw, urgent vocals supplied by firecracker Mosshart and speeding garage hooks from her backing boy bandmates."

== Track listing ==
No.	Title	Length
1.	"Broken to Blue"	3:21
2.	"Anthony is Not One of us (Conti)"	3:02
3.	"Math Won't Miss You"	2:07
4.	"Harder to Tell"	1:50
5.	"(:38)"	0:38
6.	"Ariel"	1:28
7.	"Behind Curtain#"	3:45
8.	"T.V. Kiss"	0:48
9.	"Sleeping Motor Boy"	2:31
10.	"Apostrophe"	1:54
11.	"Black and White Can't Capture Red and Blue"	3:14
12.	"Hit"	1:58
13.	"(1:04)"	1:04
14.	"Medical"	3:02
15.	"The Kill Fix"	3:10

== Personnel ==
- Alison Mosshart – vocals
- Ryan Seagrist – guitar
- Todd Rockhill – bass
- Bill Nesper – drums
- J. Robbins – recording
