= Black Balloon (The Kills song) =

Single by The Kills

from the album Midnight Boom
- B-side: "Weedkiller", "Forty Four"
- Released: March 22, 2009
- Genre: Garage rock
- Length: 3:50
- Label: Domino
- Songwriter: The Kills

The Kills singles chronology
"Tape Song" (2008)	"Black Balloon" (2009)	"Willow Weep for Me" (2009)

"Black Balloon" is the fifth and final single by indie rock duo The Kills from their third studio album, Midnight Boom (2008). It was released on March 22, 2009, through the independent label Domino. The single features two B-sides, "Weedkiller", and a cover of the blues standard "Forty Four", originally written by Roosevelt Sykes.

"Black Balloon" is a "relatively docile" song, using the black balloon as a metaphor to "signify loss and the need to move on." A music video for the song was directed by Kenneth Capello. In February 2011, "Black Balloon" was featured in an episode of the American TV series, The Good Wife. In 2014, "Black Balloon" was also featured in the movie Asthma.

== Track listing ==
No.	Title	Length
1.	"Black Balloon"	3:50
2.	"Weedkiller"	2:38
3.	"Forty Four"	3:16

== Charts ==
Chart (2011)	Peak position
France (SNEP)	74
