= Discount (band) =

American punk rock band

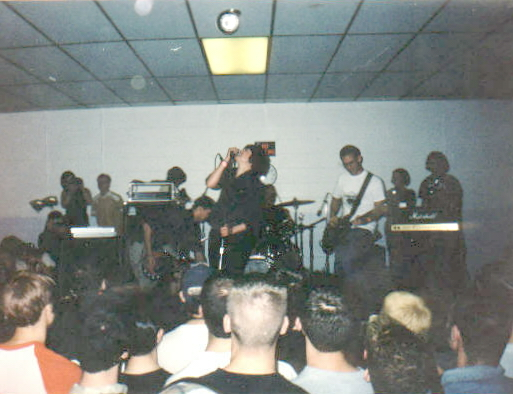
- Discount performing at Michiganfest in Wayne, Michigan, on March 25, 2000

Background information
- Origin: Vero Beach, Florida, United States
- Genre: Punk rock
- Years active: 1995–2000
- Labels: @ttitude; A.D.D.; AK Press Audio; Asian Man; Allied; Backspin; Black Rat; Boxcar; California Roll; Class Action; Cool Guy; Disillusioned; F.U.H.Q.; Far Out; Fearless; Flavour; Fueled by Ramen; G7 Welcoming Committee; Go-Kart; Good Life; Hairball 8; Honest Don's; Impresario; Kat; Lantzcentrl; Liberation; Liquid Meat; Little League; Makoto; Meth Mouth; Microcosm; Mighty IDY; Mud; New American Dream; No Idea; Outback; Over the Counter; Panic; Parking Lot; Possible Problem; Rabbit; Rockstar; Rugger Bugger; Schematics; Shagpile; Sneezeguard; Snuffy Smile; Speedowax; Suburban Home; Tripucka Parkway; Tachyon; What Else?
- Past members: Alison Mosshart; Bill Nesper; Ryan Seagrist; Todd Rockhill; James Parker; Justin Focco; Eric Ervin

Discount was an American punk rock band based in Gainesville, Florida. The band originally formed in Vero Beach, Florida in 1995, but relocated to Gainesville in 1998. They performed their last show on August 19, 2000 at Market Street Pub in Gainesville, Florida. Members have gone on to form the Dead Weather, the Kills, the Kitchen, the Terror in Tiny Town, Black Cougar Shock Unit, Unitas, the Routineers, the Draft, Laserhead, Stolen Parts, Monikers, Young Ladies, and Blab School.

During its span, Discount released three full-length albums, several EPs, and two B-side compilations. The band toured with As Friends Rust and Dillinger Four across the United States for five weeks from June 11 to July 18, 1998. In promotion of their split CD/7" with As Friends Rust, Discount embarked on a six-week European tour, from December 3, 1998 to January 14, 1999, accompanied by Swedish hardcore group Purusam. The European tour included a stop to play at the Good Life Recordings Winter Festival, in Kortrijk, Belgium.

== Members ==
Final lineup

- Alison Mosshart – lead vocals (1995–2000)
- Ryan Seagrist – guitar (1995–2000)
- Todd Rockhill – bass guitar (1999–2000)
- Bill Nesper – drums (1995–2000)

Former members

- Eric Ervin – vocals (1995)
- James Parker – bass guitar (1995–1999)
- Justin Focco – drums (1995)

== Discography ==
=== Albums ===
- Ataxia's Alright Tonight (1996), Liquid Meat/Far Out Records
- Half Fiction (1997), Kat Records
- Crash Diagnostic (2000), New American Dream

=== EPs/7-inches/splits ===
- Three Piece Suit (1995), 3-way split with Combination Grey and Pohgoh
- Mom Lied to Me (1995), Parking Lot Records/self-released
- Discount/My Pal Trigger split 7-inch (1996), Tripucka Records
- Discount/Flatspots/Wolfdaddys/Stizzle split 7-inch (1996), Boxcar Records (featuring the band's cover of The Golden Girls theme)
- All Too Often 7-inch (1996), Mighty Idy Records
- Wonder Pulled Me Under 7-inch (1996), Liquid Meat Records
- Discount/Shotwell Coho split 7-inch (1997), What Else? Records
- Discount/Cigarretteman split 7-inch (1997), Snuffy Smile/Suburban Home Records
- Discount/J Church split 7-inch (1997), Liquid Meat Records
- Her Last Day 7-inch (1997), Helter Skelter/Panic Records
- Discount/Crettins Puddle split CD EP (1998), Shock Records
- Discount/My Winter Jane split 7-inch (1998), Snuffy Smile
- Love, Billy (1998), Fueled by Ramen
- As Friends Rust / Discount (split with As Friends Rust) (1998), Good Life Recordings
- Discount/Beauty School Dropout split 7-inch (1999), Speedowax
- Open Ended Aerial 7-inch (1999), Rugger Bugger
- Read Army Faction 7-inch (2000), 4-way split with Avail, The Weakerthans and Hot Water Music, No Idea Records (all four songs were taken from the Better Read Than Dead compilation on AK Press)
- Discount/J Church split LP (2000), Rugger Bugger (featuring five ELO covers from J Church and the five Billy Bragg covers by Discount from the Love, Billy CD EP)
- Appeared on 403 Chaos Comp: Florida Fucking Hardcore (1998)
- Appeared on Songs That Will Make You Cool, a compilation released by Rockstar Recordings in 1995

=== B-side compilations ===
- Singles No. 1 (2002), New American Dream
- Singles No. 2 (2002), New American Dream
