= Midnight Boom =

Studio album by the Kills
- Released: March 10, 2008
- Recorded: 2007
- Studio: Key Club Recording Company
- Genre: Indie rock, garage rock
- Length: 33:57
- Label: Domino
- Producer: The Kills, XXXChange

The Kills chronology
No Wow (2005)	Midnight Boom (2008)	Blood Pressures (2011)

Singles from Midnight Boom
- 1. "U.R.A. Fever" Released: December 3, 2007; 2. "Cheap and Cheerful" Released: March 3, 2008; 3. "Last Day of Magic" Released: June 15, 2008; 4. "Tape Song" Released: November 16, 2008; 5. "Black Balloon" Released: March 22, 2009

Midnight Boom is the third studio album by indie rock band The Kills, released on March 10, 2008, through Domino Records (March 18, 2008, in the United States). It was recorded at the Key Club Recording Company in Benton Harbor, Michigan. The title refers to the hours from midnight to 6 a.m., in which the band was at the creative peak, writing material for the album.

== Promotion ==
"U.R.A. Fever" was released as the lead single from the album on December 3, 2007. The second single, "Cheap and Cheerful", was released on February 25, 2008. "Last Day of Magic" was released as the third single on June 15, 2008 Two final singles from the album were "Tape Song", released on November 16, 2008, and "Black Balloon", released on March 22, 2009. Both songs have charted in France.

"Sour Cherry" was featured on an episode of the TV series Gossip Girl, and became popular. "Sour Cherry" was also featured in The House Bunny. "What New York Used to Be" was used in the film Push.

== Commercial performance ==
Midnight Boom was the band's first album that charted on the Billboard 200 in the U.S., peaking at number 133. It has also charted at number 16 on the Independent Albums, number 9 on Top Tastemaker Albums, and topped the Top Heatseekers Albums chart. In Europe, it reached number 47 on the UK Albums Chart, and has also charted in Austria, Belgium, France, the Netherlands and Switzerland. In 2009. It was awarded a silver certification from the Independent Music Companies Association which indicated sales of at least 30,000 copies throughout Europe.

== Critical reception ==
Professional ratings
Aggregate scores
Source	Rating
Metacritic	75/100
Review scores
Source	Rating
AllMusic	5/5 stars
The A.V. Club	B
Entertainment Weekly	B+
The Guardian	2/5 stars
Mojo	4/5 stars
MSN Music (Consumer Guide)	A−
Pitchfork	6.8/10
Rolling Stone	3.5/5 stars
Spin	3.5/5 stars
Uncut	4/5 stars

The album received positive reviews from music critics. At Metacritic, which assigns a normalized rating out of 100 to reviews from mainstream critics, the album received an average score of 75, based on 31 reviews.

== Track listing ==
All tracks are written by The Kills.

No.	Title	Length
1.	"U.R.A. Fever"	2:16
2.	"Cheap and Cheerful"	2:26
3.	"Tape Song"	3:35
4.	"Getting Down"	2:55
5.	"Last Day of Magic"	3:21
6.	"Hook and Line"	2:03
7.	"Black Balloon"	3:46
8.	"M.E.X.I.C.O."	1:37
9.	"Sour Cherry"	3:07
10.	"Alphabet Pony"	1:45
11.	"What New York Used to Be"	3:15
12.	"Goodnight Bad Morning"	3:52
13.	"Night Train" (UK Download Bonus Track)	3:04

== Personnel ==
The Kills

- Alison Mosshart – vocals, guitar, production
- Jamie Hince – vocals, guitar, drums, percussion, production

Technical personnel

- Tom Elmhirst – audio engineering, mixing
- Jason Lader – engineering
- Jessica Ruffins – engineering
- Bill Skibbe – engineering
- Andy Taub – engineering

== Charts ==
Chart performance
Chart (2008)	Peak position
Australian Hitseekers Albums (ARIA)	11
Austrian Albums (Ö3 Austria)	66
Belgian Albums (Ultratop Flanders)	13
Belgian Alternative Albums (Ultratop Flanders)	9
Belgian Albums (Ultratop Wallonia)	70
Dutch Albums (Album Top 100)	68
Dutch Alternative Albums (Alternative Top 30)	4
French Albums (SNEP)	23
Irish Albums (IRMA)	78
Scottish Albums (OCC)	52
Swiss Albums (Schweizer Hitparade)	56
UK Albums (OCC)	47
UK Independent Albums (OCC)	1
US Billboard 200	133
US Heatseekers Albums (Billboard)	1
US Independent Albums (Billboard)	16
US Indie Store Album Sales (Billboard)	9
