= Keep on Your Mean Side =

Studio album by The Kills
- Released: March 10, 2003
- Recorded: November 2002
- Studio: Toe Rag Studios (London)
- Genre: Garage rock
- Length: 42:23
- Label: Domino
- Producer: The Kills

The Kills chronology
Black Rooster EP (2002)	Keep on Your Mean Side (2003)	No Wow (2005)

Singles from Keep on Your Mean Side
- 1. "Fuck the People" Released: 2003; 2. "Fried My Little Brains" Released: 14 April 2003; 3. "Pull A U" Released: 20 October 2003

Keep on Your Mean Side is the debut album by UK based indie rock band The Kills. Originally released on March 10, 2003, through Domino Recording Company, it was later reissued on May 4, 2009, with five additional bonus tracks.

The song "Wait" was featured in the film Children of Men (2006), while "Monkey 23" was featured in the film The Beat That My Heart Skipped (2005) and in Adam Curtis' BBC documentary All Watched Over by Machines of Loving Grace Part 1 (2011); "Cat Claw" and "Wait" were both overheard in the Criminal Minds Season 3 episode, "Doubt," and "Fried My Little Brains" was used in the Sherlock Series 3 episode, "The Sign of Three", and in the game Gran Turismo 6.

== Background ==
Following international touring, they entered Toe Rag Studios, where The White Stripes had recorded their album Elephant, to record Keep on Your Mean Side, mostly on 8-track, in just 2 weeks. Distributed in the US and UK by Rough Trade Records, the album was similar in style to the EP, veering from the Velvets-esque stomp of "Wait" to the noisy, dirty garage punk blues of "Fuck the People" and dark psychedelia of "Kissy Kissy". The record was well received by the music press, though the White Stripes comparisons would not go away.

Maintaining an anti-careerist, anti-music industry attitude, the band rarely granted interviews. Rather, they got the music press to come to them with their minimalist yet powerful live shows (which also included the drum machine), the pair maintaining an air of tension by subverting the expected role of stage performer. Mosshart chain-smoked while singing, rarely speaking to the audience, whilst Hince violently ripped blues riffs from his instrument. At a New York City show following the ban on public smoking, Mosshart went on stage with three bottles of water, lit up a cigarette and proceeded to smoke constantly from the first song to the last note of the set.

== Reception ==
Professional ratings
Aggregate scores
Source	Rating
Metacritic	70/100
Review scores
Source	Rating
AllMusic	4/5 stars
Blender	3/5 stars
The Boston Phoenix	3/4 stars
Drowned in Sound	9/10
The Guardian	4/5 stars
Mojo	4/5 stars
Pitchfork	7.8/10
Q	3/5 stars
Rolling Stone	3/5 stars
Uncut	4/5 stars

Reviews for Keep on Your Mean Side were wide-ranging but mostly positive with a few exceptions. It has a normalized rating of 70 out of 100 on Metacritic based on 18 professional reviews. Rolling Stone was complimentary, saying the music was "dark, kick-ass garage rock" and the album was "a bruising disc of post-modern blues". AllMusic described it as "sneering, sexy blues-punk" that is "relatively fresh and distinctive".

== Track listing ==
No.	Title	Length
1.	"Superstition"	4:40
2.	"Cat Claw"	3:32
3.	"Pull a U"	3:23
4.	"Kissy Kissy"	5:02
5.	"Fried My Little Brains"	2:08
6.	"Hitched" (incorrectly labeled as "Gypsy Death & You" on original album sleeve)	4:01
7.	"Black Rooster"	4:24
8.	"Wait"	4:47
9.	"Fuck the People"	4:17
10.	"Monkey 23"	3:06
11.	"Gypsy Death & You"	2:11
12.	"Hand" (incorrectly placed as title7 on original album sleeve)	:50

2009 Reissue Bonus Tracks

No.	Title	Length
13.	"Gum"	1:21
14.	"Jewel Thief"	2:47
15.	"Sugar Baby" (Dock Boggs cover)	4:20
16.	"The Search for Cherry Red" (Jonathan Fire Eater cover)	2:58
17.	"Dropout Boogie" (Captain Beefheart cover)	4:07

== Personnel ==
The Kills

- Jamie "Hotel" Hince - vocals, guitars, dictaphone, organ, harmonica, electric viola, drum machine, production
- Alison "VV" Mosshart – vocals, guitars, dictaphone, production

== Charts ==
Chart (2003)	Peak position
French Albums Chart	75
UK Albums Chart	47
