= God Games =

Studio album by the Kills
- Released: October 27, 2023
- Studio: The Church (London); Electric Lady (New York City); Sweetzerland (Los Angeles)
- Genre: Rock
- Length: 39:25
- Label: Domino
- Producer: Paul Epworth; Jamie Hince

The Kills chronology
Ash & Ice (2016)	God Games (2023)

Singles from God Games
- 1. "New York" / "LA Hex" Released: August 30, 2023

God Games is the sixth studio album by English-American indie rock duo the Kills, released on October 27, 2023, through Domino. It follows seven years after their previous album, 2016's Ash & Ice, and was produced by Paul Epworth. The album was preceded by the dual lead single "New York" / "LA Hex", and received acclaim from critics.

== Background and music ==
Guitarist Jamie Hince stated that he intended to make a side project to compose music "that wasn't like The Kills" before he "quickly realized it was The Kills". He and producer and drummer Paul Epworth worked more on programming rather than guitar-based music as with previous Kills albums. The Independent described the music as "Siouxsie Sioux and a hex" with "corroded dub, voodoo funk, insidious gospel, junk shop pop and even a bit of flamenco calypso".

== Critical reception ==
Professional ratings
Aggregate scores
Source	Rating
Metacritic	82/100
Review scores
Source	Rating
AllMusic	4.5/5 stars
American Songwriter	3.5/5 stars
DIY	5/5 stars
Exclaim!	8/10
Far Out	3/5 stars
Mojo	4/5 stars
MusicOMH	3.5/5 stars
Uncut	7/10
Under the Radar	8/10

God Games received a score of 82 out of 100 on review aggregator Metacritic based on 11 critics' reviews, indicating "universal acclaim". Hal Horowitz of American Songwriter wrote that the duo "prove that the time off hasn't dulled their artistic edge" and remarked that the absence of guitar work on some tracks "delineates how this disc has shifted away from the twosome's previous work", which "makes for an intense, generally unrelenting forty-minute project; one that pushes The Kills into fresh musical territory". Mojo described the album as "sun-scorched Californian jams", while Uncut felt that "the set ranges ambitiously from hypnotic, twisted love songs such as '103' and the title track to the warped gospel undertones of 'My Girls My Girls' and 'LA Hex', courtesy of the Compton Kidz Club Choir".

Joe Goggins of DIY stated that the album "comes over sounding like their most ambitious and handsome release yet" and while one might "wish The Kills were a touch more prolific, especially in recent years", the album, "like its predecessors, has proved worth the wait". Exclaim!'s Alan Ranta opined that "while the band has always been a rock-first concern, the core of God Games is in its mature, layered and emotive downtempo pop balladry". Ranta ended his review by saying "here's hoping their magic still has enough juju to make it happen, for all our sake. If the strange alchemy of their career holds, better days may very well be ahead". Cheri Amour of The Arts Desk found that Epworth has "trace[d] them back to that darker strain of rolling rock", describing it as "a rejoiceful return".

== Track listing ==
All tracks are written by Jamie Hince and Alison Mosshart.

God Games track listing
No.	Title	Length
1.	"New York"	4:04
2.	"Going to Heaven"	3:48
3.	"LA Hex"	3:14
4.	"Love and Tenderness"	2:40
5.	"103"	4:05
6.	"My Girls My Girls"	3:38
7.	"Wasterpiece"	3:11
8.	"Kingdom Come"	3:19
9.	"God Games"	2:25
10.	"Blank"	2:27
11.	"Bullet Sound"	3:47
12.	"Better Days"	2:47
Total length:		39:25

== Personnel ==
The Kills

- Jamie Hince – performance, production, artwork, photography
- Alison Mosshart – performance, artwork, photography

Additional musicians

- Fred Martin – choir vocal arrangement, choir vocals (tracks 3, 6)
- Zharia Clausell – choir vocals (tracks 3, 6)
- Tiana Paul – choir vocals (tracks 3, 6)
- Tai Philips – choir vocals (tracks 3, 6)
- Tunay Raymond – choir vocals (tracks 3, 6)

Technical personnel

- Paul Epworth – production (tracks 1–8, 10, 11)
- Riley MacIntyre – additional production (tracks 9, 12), mixing (2, 7), engineering (all tracks)
- Robert Adam Stevenson – additional engineering
- Chiara Ferracuti – engineering assistance
- Tom Elmhirst – mixing (tracks 1, 3, 4, 6, 8–12)
- Adam Wong – mix engineering (tracks 1, 3, 4, 6, 8–12)
- Colin Leonard – mastering
- Rachel Briggs – cover painting
- Matthew Cooper – design
- Paul J. Street – design

== Charts ==
Chart performance for God Games
Chart (2023)	Peak position
Austrian Albums (Ö3 Austria)	39
Belgian Albums (Ultratop Flanders)	139
Belgian Albums (Ultratop Wallonia)	60
French Albums (SNEP)	46
German Albums (Offizielle Top 100)	31
Portuguese Albums (AFP)	46
Scottish Albums (OCC)	16
Swiss Albums (Schweizer Hitparade)	70
UK Albums (OCC)	66
UK Album Downloads (OCC)	25
UK Independent Albums (OCC)	9
US Top Album Sales (Billboard)	49
