= Political Animals (miniseries) =

US comedy drama miniseries

- Promotional poster for the series with the tagline "Power runs in the family."
- Genre: Comedy drama
- Created by: Greg Berlanti
- Starring: Sigourney Weaver; Carla Gugino; James Wolk; Sebastian Stan; Brittany Ishibashi; Ellen Burstyn; Ciarán Hinds
- Opening theme: "Future Starts Slow" by The Kills
- Composer: Blake Neely
- Country of origin: United States
- Original language: English
- No. of episodes: 6

Production
- Executive producers: Greg Berlanti; Laurence Mark; Sarah Caplan
- Production companies: Berlanti Productions; Laurence Mark Productions; Warner Horizon Television

Original release
- Network: USA Network
- Release: July 15 – August 19, 2012

Political Animals is an American comedy drama miniseries created by Greg Berlanti. The series aired in the United States on USA Network from July 15 through August 19, 2012. Sigourney Weaver portrays Elaine Barrish, a divorced former First Lady and Governor of Illinois, as well as the current Secretary of State. Weaver and the show's production team acknowledge that the lead character has some similarities to Hillary Clinton. They say that the premise of the show is "very much about all families who have been in the White House, the price they've paid for being there and the fact that those same families will often try or continue to try to get back into the White House again."

While it was speculated that the miniseries would lead into a full season, on November 2, 2012, USA Network announced their decision to stick with their initial plan of producing it as a miniseries.

== Overview ==
Elaine Barrish's husband Bud Hammond was a popular President of the United States during the 1990s despite his extramarital affairs. After leaving the White House, Elaine Barrish was elected Governor of Illinois and ran for the Democratic nomination for President, but lost to Paul Garcetti. The night Barrish conceded the nomination, she asked her husband for a divorce. Two years later, as Garcetti's Secretary of State, Barrish deals with State Department issues while trying to keep her family together.

== Cast and characters ==
=== Main cast ===
- Sigourney Weaver as Elaine Barrish, the recently divorced Secretary of State and former First Lady and Governor of Illinois who fights various political opponents.
- Carla Gugino as Susan Berg, a reporter who has spent much time trying to undermine Elaine, but eventually becomes an unlikely ally.
- James Wolk as Douglas Hammond, Elaine's son, Chief of Staff, and T.J.'s twin brother.
- Sebastian Stan as Thomas James "T.J." Hammond, Elaine's son, who is gay.
- Brittany Ishibashi as Anne Ogami, Doug's fiancée.
- Ellen Burstyn as Margaret Barrish, Elaine's mother and a former showgirl in Las Vegas.
- Ciarán Hinds as Donald "Bud" Hammond, the former President and Governor of North Carolina, and Elaine's ex-husband.

=== Recurring cast ===
- Adrian Pasdar as Paul Garcetti, the current President who defeated Elaine in the presidential primaries but later appointed her Secretary of State. He is described as "a smart man who uses every resource at his disposal to his advantage".
- Dylan Baker as Fred Collier, the two-faced Vice President and former Director of Central Intelligence who is hiding some secrets.
- Roger Bart as Barry Harris, the White House Chief of Staff and Elaine's former campaign manager for her presidential campaign.
- Dan Futterman as Alex Davies, editor of the Washington Globe and Susan Berg's former boyfriend.
- Meghann Fahy as Georgia Gibbons, an ambitious young blogger who works with Susan Berg.
- LaMonica Garrett as Agent Clark, a Diplomatic Security Service agent charged with protecting Elaine.
- Linda Powell as Pauline Samson, the National Security Advisor to the President.
- Griffin Newman as Russ, Susan's personal assistant.
- Kristine Nielsen as Alice, the State Department Chief of Staff.

=== Guest cast ===
- Igor Jijikine as Viktor Porchov, the Foreign Minister of Russia.
- Vanessa Redgrave as Justice Diane Nash, first openly gay Supreme Court Justice, personal friend, and mentor of Elaine.
- Blair Brown as Mrs. Berg, a former doctor and the mother of Susan Berg.
- David Monahan as Sean Reeves, a Congressman from Ohio and T.J.'s former partner in the closet.
- Dennisha Pratt as Newsreporter, for a station covering the story.

== Development and production ==
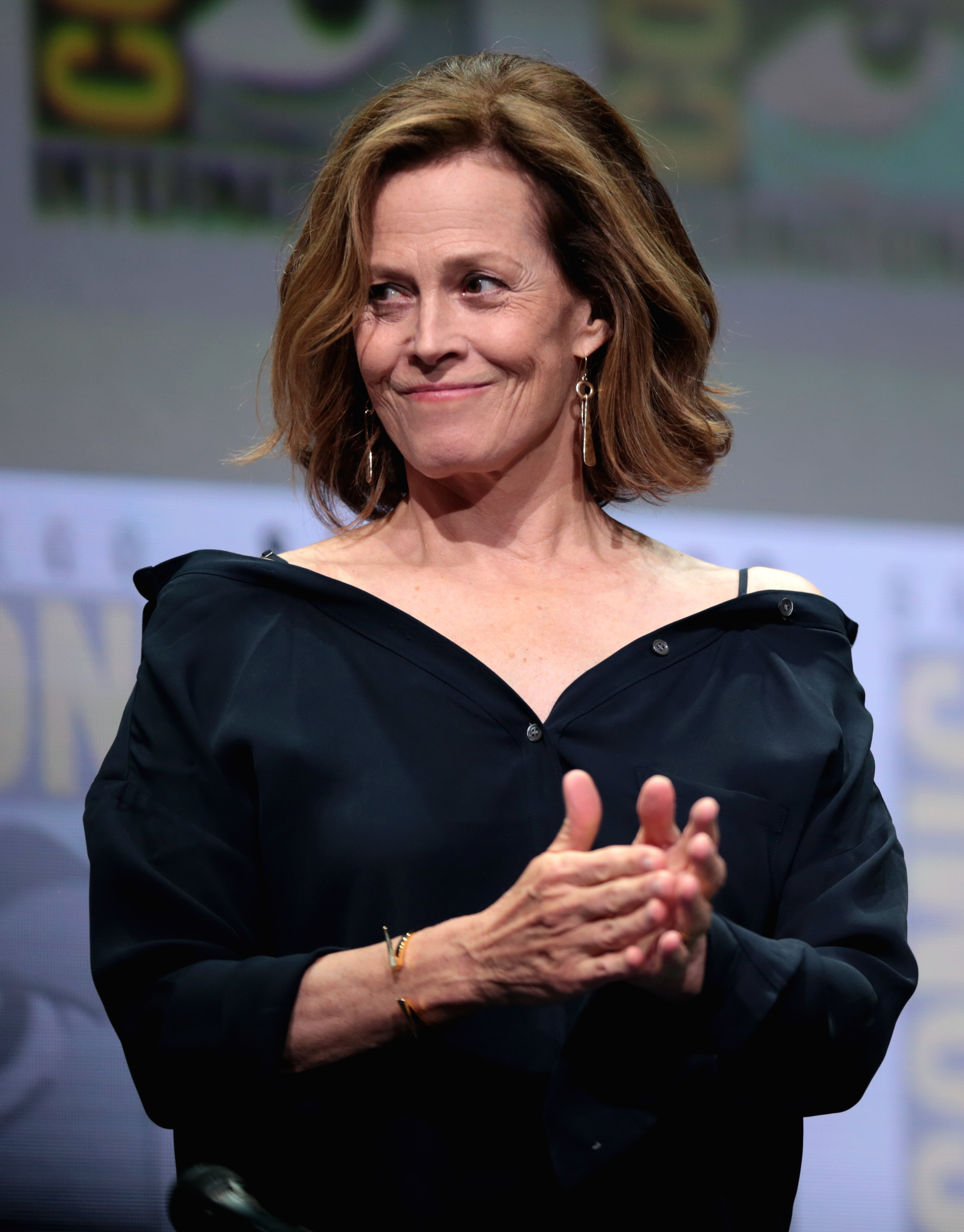
Sigourney Weaver was cast in the role of Elaine Barrish on March 6, 2012.

On January 30, 2012, USA Network announced the development of a six-hour series to focus on a former First Family. They simultaneously announced that the pilot would be written and directed by Greg Berlanti, who would executive produce the series with Laurence Mark. Sarah Caplan was later announced to be executive producing as well. Ann Roth served as Weaver's costume designer for the first episode.

James Wolk was the first actor to be cast; it was announced on February 10, 2012, that he would be portraying Douglas Hammond, the son of Elaine Barrish. Three days later, it was revealed that Brittany Ishibashi would be playing Doug's fiancée, Anne Ogami. On March 6, 2012, Sigourney Weaver was cast in the lead role of Elaine Barrish. On March 9, 2012, it was announced that Carla Gugino had joined the cast as Susan Berg, a reporter who becomes one of Elaine's closest allies. Sebastian Stan joined the series on March 15, 2012, as T. J. Hammond, the other son of Elaine Barrish, and Doug's brother. One week later, it was announced that Ciarán Hinds would play the former president and Elaine's ex-husband, Bud Hammond. By April 14, 2012, Ellen Burstyn had joined the series as Margaret Barrish, Elaine's mother and a former Vegas showgirl. On May 2, 2012, it was announced that Adrian Pasdar would appear in a recurring role in all six episodes as the current president, Paul Garcetti. The casting of Dylan Baker in the recurring role of Vice President Fred Collier was announced on May 7, 2012.

Linda Powell, the daughter of former United States Secretary of State Colin Powell, appeared in the first episode as the national security advisor to the president. Roger Bart, Dan Futterman, and Vanessa Redgrave also made appearances in the series. David Monahan appeared in the fourth episode, while Blair Brown appeared in the fifth as Barbara Berg, the mother of Susan.

By May 2, 2012, principal photography had begun in Philadelphia, Pennsylvania.

The theme music is "Future Starts Slow" by The Kills.

== Episodes ==
No.	Title	Directed by	Written by	Original release date	U.S. viewers (millions)
1	"Pilot"	Greg Berlanti	Greg Berlanti	July 15, 2012	2.62
After losing the Democratic primary race to Paul Garcetti, candidate and former First Lady Elaine Hammond asks her husband, former President Bud Hammond, for a divorce. Two years later, Elaine, now going by her maiden name Barrish, is the Secretary of State under President Garcetti. When an enterprising reporter, Susan Berg, tries to reveal that Elaine's son T.J. attempted suicide due to personal problems, Elaine allows Berg to follow her for a week to silence the story. During that time, three journalists are taken hostage in Iran, disrupting her son Douglas's engagement party. Elaine tells Bud she plans to send him to Oman to negotiate. At the end of the episode, she privately tells her bodyguard that she plans to once again run for President.
2	"Second Time Around"	Bethany Rooney	Greg Berlanti & Molly Newman	July 22, 2012	2.28
Elaine convinces Garcetti to send Bud to negotiate for the hostages, but Vice President Collier remains unsure. Douglas discovers T.J. has begun taking drugs again. Collier announces on television that something will happen in Oman relating to the hostage crisis, causing Oman to pull out. Elaine makes a last-minute deal with the Turkish ambassador to hold the talks in Istanbul. Bud is successful and frees the hostages. Back home, T.J. attempts to steal money from his grandmother for his new nightclub after being denied money by her and his parents, but is unable to go through with it. Douglas ends up giving him the money. After Douglas's engagement party is finally held, he leaks to Berg that his mother will run again.
3	"The Woman Problem"	Michael Morris	Phil Klemmer & Brian Peterson & Kelly Souders	July 29, 2012	1.73
In an attempt to stop Elaine from running against him, Garcetti asks her longtime mentor, Justice Diane Nash (Vanessa Redgrave), to retire from the Supreme Court so he can appoint Elaine to take Nash's place. Nash considers taking the offer as her longtime partner is dying. However, someone in the White House leaks the details to the press, allowing Susan to tip off Elaine. Meanwhile, Elaine announces her candidacy to her family, drawing negative reactions from her mother. Bud, Douglas, and T.J. take a fishing trip and stay at the home of a pollster. The pollster predicts Elaine will win in the primary, but only if Bud remains out of the spotlight. Elaine convinces Nash not to accept Garcetti's offer and Susan holds off her story on Elaine's candidacy on the condition that Douglas tell her everything that led up to it.
4	"Lost Boys"	David Petrarca	Speed Weed & Geoffrey Nauffts	August 5, 2012	1.80
In a flashback, it is revealed that T.J.'s suicide attempt stemmed from an affair with a closeted Republican congressman, the latter of whom was blackmailed by the White House. In the present, Garcetti refuses to aid a sunken Chinese submarine off the West Coast. After an appeal to the Chinese fails, Elaine tells Garcetti that she will imminently announce her candidacy against him unless he rescues the Chinese crewmen. Georgia tricks Anne into confirming Elaine's presidential plans and leverages that knowledge into sharing a byline on the breaking story with Susan. T.J. opens his club despite the refusal of his parents to attend the opening as previously planned. T.J.'s dealer gives him cocaine at the club. Bud arrives at the opening and discovers T.J., unconscious following an overdose.
5	"16 Hours"	Tucker Gates	Phil Klemmer & Nicholas Wootton	August 12, 2012	1.98
To deflect attention from T.J.'s overdose, Elaine asks Susan to write up a fake story in exchange for exclusive coverage of the submarine rescue. During the flight to San Diego, drunken flirtation between Douglas and Susan leads to a sexual encounter. Meanwhile, Douglas' grandmother then reveals to Anne that she knows that she is bulimic. T.J. wakes up with Elaine lying next to him in a chair; he apologizes profusely and falls back asleep. Bud arrives and Elaine leaves to confront Garcetti, who has learned that China's plans to scuttle the submarine will release a radioactive plume over San Diego. Elaine convinces Garcetti to ignore Chinese threats and successfully rescue the crewmen.
6	"Resignation Day"	David Petrarca	Molly Newman & Speed Weed	August 19, 2012	2.34
Garcetti refuses Elaine's resignation, asking her to run in the next election as his Vice President. Douglas comes clean about his betrayal to his mother after leaking out family secrets, including Elaine's resignation letter, to Susan. Air Force One crashes in France with President Garcetti aboard. Elaine helps avert a potential constitutional crisis by convincing Vice President Collier to invoke the Twenty-fifth Amendment to become Acting President, rather than taking the presidential oath of office. Douglas and his fiancée Anne elope but the Hammonds crash the wedding after T.J. figures out where they have gone. Bud tries to persuade Elaine to run against Collier.

== International broadcasts ==
The show aired on the Bravo specialty channel in Canada, with episodes playing on the same day as in the United States.

== Reception ==
=== Critical reception ===
Political Animals received "generally favorable" reviews based on an aggregate score of 65/100 from 33 critics on Metacritic. Rob Brunner of Entertainment Weekly called the series a "well-acted, entertainingly soapy drama" that "offers a fun and credible look at the complicated intersection of love, gender, and politics." The Los Angeles Times' Robert Lloyd called the series "a high-class, relatively naturalistic, behind-closed-doors soap opera that plays in fairly obvious yet also fairly affecting ways with the space between public face and private pain and is made highly watchable by an excellent cast that finds the human among the hokum." Alan Sepinwall of HitFix stated: "with a cast this good, and with so many potentially juicy conflicts already in play, I'm going to take a more optimistic point of view than Elaine Barrish might."

However, there were some detractors. Linda Stasi of the New York Post simply stated: "The actors are great, but the show isn't." The Hollywood Reporter's Tim Goodman commented: "what Animals is trying to do is take The West Wing and turn it into Dallas. And if you don't like Dallas, that can be a real let down [sic]." Verne Gay of Newsday was the harshest critic, calling the series "stupendously silly," adding "it's a clanking, clattering collection of collagenous clinkers—of dialogue so inept, of acting performances so preposterous, of plot points so clichéd that the only question worth posing is why someone of Weaver's stature would be caught anywhere near a turkey like this."

== Accolades ==
Year	Award	Category	Nominee(s)	Result	Ref.
2012	Critics' Choice Television Awards	Most Exciting New Series		Won	
2012	Satellite Awards	Best Actress in a Miniseries or a Motion Picture Made for Television	Sigourney Weaver	Nominated	
2013	Artios Awards	Outstanding Achievement in Casting – Television Movie/Mini Series	David Rubin, Diane Heery, Melissa Pryor, and Jason Loftus	Nominated	
2013	Critics' Choice Television Awards	Best Movie/Miniseries		Nominated	
2013	Critics' Choice Television Awards	Best Actress in a Movie/ Miniseries	Sigourney Weaver	Nominated	
2013	Critics' Choice Television Awards	Best Supporting Actor in a Movie/Miniseries	Sebastian Stan	Nominated	
2013	Critics' Choice Television Awards	Best Supporting Actress in a Movie/Miniseries	Ellen Burstyn	Nominated	
2013	Directors Guild of America Awards	Outstanding Directorial Achievement in Movies for Television and Miniseries	Greg Berlanti (Episode: Pilot)	Nominated	
2013	GLAAD Media Awards	Outstanding Limited or Anthology Series		Nominated	
2013	Golden Globe Awards	Best Miniseries or TV Film		Nominated	
2013	Golden Globe Awards	Best Actress – Miniseries or TV Film	Sigourney Weaver	Nominated	
2013	Online Film & Television Association Awards	Best Motion Picture or Miniseries		Nominated	
2013	Online Film & Television Association Awards	Best Actress in a Motion Picture or Miniseries	Sigourney Weaver	Nominated	
2013	Online Film & Television Association Awards	Best Supporting Actor in a Motion Picture or Miniseries	Sebastian Stan	Nominated	
2013	Online Film & Television Association Awards	Best Supporting Actress in a Motion Picture or Miniseries	Ellen Burstyn	Nominated	
2013	Online Film & Television Association Awards	Best Direction of a Motion Picture or Miniseries		Nominated	
2013	Online Film & Television Association Awards	Best Writing of a Motion Picture or Miniseries		Nominated	
2013	Online Film & Television Association Awards	Best Ensemble in a Motion Picture or Miniseries		Nominated	
2013	Online Film & Television Association Awards	Best Cinematography in a Non-Series		Nominated	
2013	Online Film & Television Association Awards	Best Editing in a Non-Series		Nominated	
2013	Online Film & Television Association Awards	Best Music in a Non-Series		Nominated	
2013	Primetime Emmy Awards	Outstanding Miniseries or Movie	Greg Berlanti, Laurence Mark, Sarah Caplan, and Melissa Kellner Berman	Nominated	
2013	Primetime Emmy Awards	Outstanding Lead Actress in a Miniseries or a Movie	Sigourney Weaver	Nominated	
2013	Primetime Emmy Awards	Outstanding Supporting Actress in a Miniseries or a Movie	Ellen Burstyn	Won	
2013	Primetime Creative Arts Emmy Awards	Outstanding Casting for a Miniseries, Movie or a Special	David Rubin and Diane Heery	Nominated	
2013	Primetime Creative Arts Emmy Awards	Outstanding Hairstyling for a Miniseries or a Movie	Mary Ann Valdes, Nancy Stimac, and Qodi Armstrong	Nominated	
2013	Screen Actors Guild Awards	Outstanding Performance by a Female Actor in a Television Movie or Miniseries	Sigourney Weaver	Nominated	
2013	Writers Guild of America Awards	Long Form – Original	Greg Berlanti (Episode: Pilot)	Nominated	
