= Ash & Ice =

Studio album by the Kills
- Released: June 3, 2016
- Studio: Key Club Recording Co. Mobile (Los Angeles); Electric Lady (New York City)
- Length: 50:42
- Label: Domino
- Producer: Jamie Hince

The Kills chronology
Blood Pressures (2011)	Ash & Ice (2016)	God Games (2023)

Singles from Ash & Ice
- 1. "Doing It to Death" Released: March 1, 2016; 2. "Heart of a Dog" Released: April 18, 2016; 3. "Siberian Nights" Released: May 24, 2016; 4. "Impossible Tracks" Released: September 13, 2016

Ash & Ice is the fifth studio album by indie rock band the Kills, released on June 3, 2016, through Domino. The album was recorded in a rented house in Los Angeles and at Electric Lady Studios in New York City. It was produced by Jamie Hince and co-produced by John O'Mahoney. It was promoted by the singles "Doing It to Death" and "Heart of a Dog".

== Formats and packaging ==
The album was made available as a CD – with a 20-page booklet with lyrics and album artwork – and as digital download.

A limited-edition double LP was also made available. The LPs are coloured in blue and pink and packaged into a wide spine jacket with a gold foil imprint. The release also includes two fold-out posters, two printed inner sleeves and an exclusive lyric zine, with the first 250 orders signed by the band.

== Promotion ==
The lead single from the album, "Doing It to Death", was released on March 1, 2016. It was accompanied by a music video directed by Wendy Morgan. The second single from the album, "Heart of a Dog", and an accompanying music video directed by Sophie Muller, were released on April 18, 2016. "Siberian Nights" was released as the third single on May 24, 2016. A music video promoting the song was directed by American actor Giovanni Ribisi.

In support of the album, the band toured the United States from March to June 2016. The Kills also performed in Mexico City on March 16, in Amsterdam, Paris, London, Toronto and Vancouver in May 2016, and at the Isle of Wight Festival in June. In July, played at the U-Park Festival in Kyiv, Ukraine, and at the Park Live Festival in Moscow, Russia, as well as the Off Festival in Katowice, Poland, in August before returning to the U.S. in September and then back to Europe through October and November. They performed "Whirling Eye" on The Late Late Show with James Corden on the October 21, 2016, episode.

== Critical reception ==
Professional ratings
Aggregate scores
Source	Rating
Metacritic	68/100
Review scores
Source	Rating
AllMusic	3.5/5 stars
Consequence of Sound	C−
Entertainment Weekly	A−
Exclaim!	7/10
The Guardian	3/5 stars
musicOMH	3/5 stars
NME	4/5
Pitchfork	6.2/10
Spin	6/10

Ash & Ice received generally positive reviews from music critics. At Metacritic, which assigns a normalized rating out of 100 to reviews from mainstream critics, the album received an average score of 68, based on 21 reviews. Writing for Exclaim!, Laura Sciarpelletti praised the band's "bare bones power technique". Pitchfork were decidedly cooler on the album's merits, awarding it a score of 6.2. They called the record "a little too chilled for its own good."

== Track listing ==
All tracks are written by the Kills, except where noted.

Ash & Ice track listing
No.	Title	Writer(s)	Length
1.	"Doing It to Death"		4:07
2.	"Heart of a Dog"		3:46
3.	"Hard Habit to Break"		3:52
4.	"Bitter Fruit"		4:14
5.	"Days of Why and How"		4:32
6.	"Let It Drop"		3:15
7.	"Hum for Your Buzz"		3:17
8.	"Siberian Nights"	The Kills; Renee Scroggins	4:53
9.	"That Love"		2:33
10.	"Impossible Tracks"		3:41
11.	"Black Tar"		3:52
12.	"Echo Home"		5:06
13.	"Whirling Eye"		3:34

=== Sample credits ===
- "Heart of a Dog" contains a sample of "Wildfire" performed by Sbtrkt featuring Little Dragon
- "Days of Why and How" contains a sample of "Is There Any Love" performed by Trevor Dandy
- "Let It Drop" contains a sample from "IMC" performed by Spank Rock
- "Siberian Nights" uses elements from "UFO" written by Renee Scroggins
- "Impossible Tracks" contains a sample of "I Thank the Lord" performed by the Mighty Voices of Wonder

== Personnel ==
=== The Kills ===
- Alison Mosshart
- Jamie Hince – drum programming

=== Additional musicians ===
- Dean Fertita – piano (track 9)
- Homer Steinweiss – drums (tracks 1, 2, 4, 8, 11, 13)

=== Technical ===
- Jamie Hince – production
- John O'Mahoney – co-production
- Tom Elmhirst – mixing (Note: Mixed at Electric Lady Studios (New York City)) (tracks 2, 4–9, 11–13)
- Joe Visciano – engineering for mix (tracks 2, 4–9, 11–13)
- Brandon Bost – mixing assistance (tracks 2, 4–9, 11–13)
- Tchad Blake – mixing (Note: Mixed at Full Mongrel Studios (Wales)) (tracks 1, 3, 10)
- Phil Joly – engineering
- Barry McCready – recording assistance
- Bill Skibbe – engineering
- Vanessa Silberman – recording assistance
- Jon Gilbert – recording assistance
- Kurt Uenala – drum editing, additional production
- Brian Lucey – mastering (Note: Mastered at Magic Garden Mastering (Columbus, Ohio))

=== Artwork ===
- Alison Mosshart – interior artwork, photographs
- Jamie Hince – photographs
- Brian Roettinger – design

== Charts ==
Chart performance for Ash & Ice
Chart (2016)	Peak position
Australian Albums (ARIA)	21
Austrian Albums (Ö3 Austria)	15
Belgian Albums (Ultratop Flanders)	25
Belgian Albums (Ultratop Wallonia)	16
Canadian Albums (Billboard)	61
Dutch Albums (Album Top 100)	51
French Albums (SNEP)	11
German Albums (Offizielle Top 100)	25
Irish Albums (IRMA)	84
New Zealand Albums (RMNZ)	11
Portuguese Albums (AFP)	33
Scottish Albums (OCC)	12
Swiss Albums (Schweizer Hitparade)	14
UK Albums (OCC)	18
UK Independent Albums (OCC)	3
US Billboard 200	45
US Independent Albums (Billboard)	4
US Top Alternative Albums (Billboard)	3
US Top Rock Albums (Billboard)	7
