= Alison Mosshart =

American musician

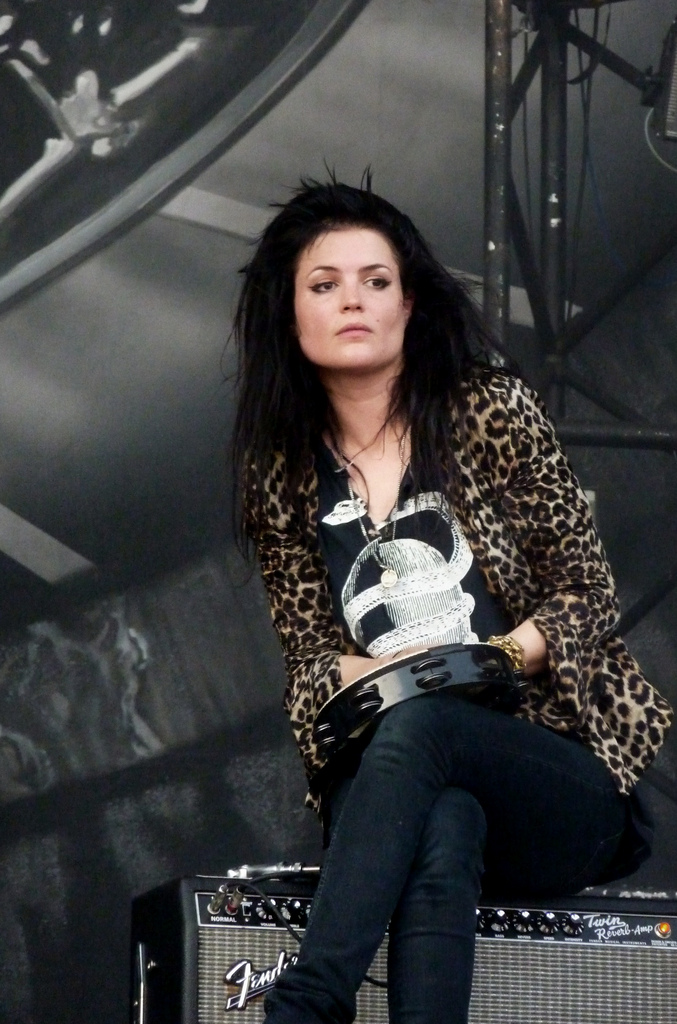
- Mosshart in 2010

Background information
- Also known as: VV, Baby Ruthless
- Born: November 23, 1978 (age 47)
- Origin: Vero Beach, Florida, U.S.
- Genres: Post-punk revival; alternative rock; psychedelic rock; garage rock; blues rock; indie rock
- Occupations: Singer; songwriter
- Instruments: Vocals, guitar
- Years active: 1995–present
- Partner: Damian Lewis (2022–present)

Alison Nicole Mosshart (born November 23, 1978) is an American singer, songwriter, artist, and the lead vocalist for the rock bands The Kills and The Dead Weather. She started her musical career in 1995 with the Florida punk rock band Discount, which disbanded in 2000. She then co-founded the Kills with British guitarist Jamie Hince in 2000 in London.

In The Kills' first album, Mosshart was known by her stage name "VV" and Hince was known as "Hotel".

In early 2009, she joined the supergroup The Dead Weather, formed by Jack White, along with Jack Lawrence and Dean Fertita. In that band, her stage name is "Baby Ruthless".

== Musical career ==
=== Discount ===
Mosshart formed pop-punk band Discount (for which she was the singer) at the age of 17 with skateboarding friends in Vero Beach, Florida. The band recorded their first album, Ataxia's Alright Tonight when the band members were still in high school, and began touring aggressively throughout the DIY punk underground in North America and Europe. As a front-person, Mosshart distinguished herself through her intense, erratic, and earnest stage presence. Discount's subsequent album, Half Fiction, was subsequently named the 50th Greatest Pop-Punk Album of all time by Rolling Stone magazine. The band moved from Vero Beach to Gainesville, and released their final album, Crash Diagnostic in 2000. The album reflected a move toward more angular sounds and detached lyrics than the emotionally frank pop-punk of the previous two albums. After touring in support of the album, the band played their last show in Gainesville in August 2000.

=== The Kills ===
Before the two even met, Mosshart, while on tour with Discount, overheard Hince playing music in a squat above where she and the band were staying. She finally approached him, after which they started playing around with some music ideas. After she went back to Florida, she continued writing songs with Hince, by sending her ideas overseas to London where he lived. She became very exhausted and ill, so after saving money, Mosshart moved to London and the duo officially started. She has tattooed the date of their first concert on her left hand: 14 February 2002.

In 2003, The Kills released their first album Keep on Your Mean Side. In 2005, they released their follow-up album No Wow.

In 2008, Midnight Boom was released, and singles "U R A Fever", "Cheap and Cheerful", and "Sour Cherry" got much more exposure than the Kills' previous singles on shows and movies like House M.D., 90210, The House Bunny, Friday the 13th (2009 film), and The Losers.

On January 11, 2011, Mosshart announced the name of the new album Blood Pressures. It was released April 5 in the U.S. and April 4 elsewhere. The album is their most commercially successful to date. During the 'Blood Pressures' tour they celebrated their 10-year anniversary on February 11, 2012. They have released a photography book called Dream & Drive of their past 9 years with the photographer Kenneth Capello.

On June 26, 2014, The Kills opened for Jack White in the Royal Hospital Kilmainham, Dublin, for White's Lazaretto tour. Mosshart joined White to perform White's song "Love Interruption", and both Mosshart and Hince joined White to perform Leadbelly's "Goodnight Irene".

On June 3, 2016, The Kills released their album Ash and Ice.

=== The Dead Weather ===
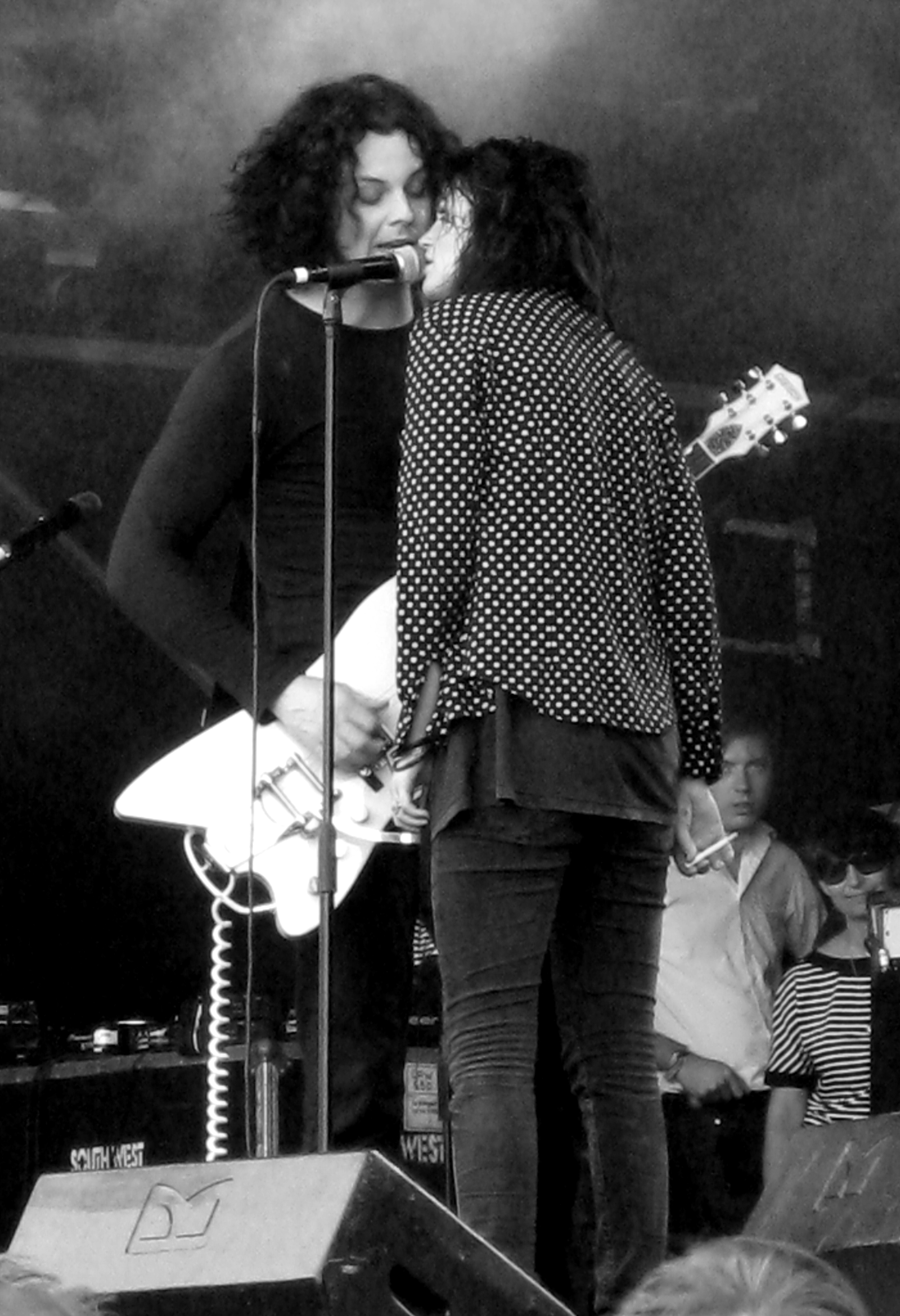
Alison Mosshart and Jack White performing live with the Dead Weather at the Glastonbury Festival, June 26, 2009.

Mosshart is one of the original members of the alternative rock band The Dead Weather, formed in late 2008. She had performed previously with Jack White and Jack Lawrence and The Raconteurs, prior to this band's formation. She sings lead vocals and plays rhythm guitar.

She co-wrote (with Dean Fertita) the band's first single "Hang You from the Heavens", which was released on March 11, 2009. Mosshart also wrote "So Far From Your Weapon" and co-wrote the other eight of the ten original tracks on their debut album Horehound.

In 2010, a second album - Sea of Cowards - was released. The lead single, "Die By the Drop", was written by Mosshart, Fertita, and Lawrence.

Mosshart and White jammed with Seasick Steve and John Paul Jones for the 2011 ITunes Festival.

White's Third Man Records released a book made by Mosshart for her three bandmates called Shark Infested Soda Fountain containing pictures she took during their tour.

In 2014, she joined Jack White on stage for his show at Bridge School Benefit to perform "I Cut Like A Buffalo" (from Horehound) and "Love Interruption" (from White's solo album Blunderbuss) with him while Dean Fertita was playing guitar.

On August 29, 2013, The Dead Weather announced that they had returned to the studio to record a follow-up to 2010's Sea of Cowards. Announcement of their third album, Dodge and Burn, came in July 2015 for a release in September by Third Man Records. Along with four previously released tracks, remixed and remastered, the album features eight new songs.

== Art ==
Mosshart debuted her artwork as part of ArtNowNY's collaborative exhibit, Push It, in 2014. Her primary medium is paint.

In 2015, she had first solo art show, Fire Power, at the Joseph Gross Gallery in New York.

In 2016, she featured in the Impossible Project in Berlin where she exhibited photographs.

== Fashion ==
In April 2011, Mosshart contributed to British Vogue's "Today I'm Wearing" feature, sharing a picture of her outfits each day for one month.

In 2013, she teamed up with French brand Surface to Air to design her ideal leather jacket.

The model and fashion designer Alexa Chung cites Mosshart as a style idol in a 2010 British Vogue article.

== Personal life ==
Mosshart grew up in Vero Beach, Florida. Mosshart maintains a residence in London, England, as well as in Nashville, Tennessee.

She has been in a relationship with actor Damian Lewis since 2022.

== Discography ==
=== With Discount ===
- Ataxia's Alright Tonight (1996)
- Half Fiction (1997)
- Crash Diagnostic (2000)

=== With The Kills ===
- Keep on Your Mean Side (2003)
- No Wow (2005)
- Midnight Boom (2008)
- Blood Pressures (2011)
- Ash & Ice (2016)
- Little Bastards (2020)
- God Games (2023)

=== With The Dead Weather ===
- Horehound (2009)
- Sea of Cowards (2010)
- Dodge and Burn (2015)

=== Appears on ===
- "State Of 6pm" and "Voice Of The Actors": vocals on Palatka album The End Of Irony (1999)
- "Meds": vocals on Placebo album Meds (2006)
- "Dolls (Sweet Rock and Roll)" and "Suicide Sally & Johnny Guitar": vocals on Primal Scream album Riot City Blues (2006)
- "Paris Summer": live performance vocals on Last Shadow Puppets CD single My Mistakes Were Made For You (2008)
- "Fire and the Thud" with Arctic Monkeys: co-wrote the song and did backing vocals on album Humbug (2009)
- "Rolling in on a Burning Tire": vocals with the Dead Weather on The Twilight Saga: Eclipse soundtrack (2010)
- "Tomorrow Never Knows": vocals with Carla Azar on soundtrack for Sucker Punch (2011)
- "What A Wonderful World": vocals with the Forest Rangers on Songs of Anarchy: Music from Sons of Anarchy Seasons 1–4 (2011)
- "The Passenger": vocals with the Forest Rangers on Sons of Anarchy Volume 2 Soundtrack (2012)
- "Unwelcome Company": vocals on Henry Wagons solo EP Expecting Company? (2012)
- "It's Just Forever": vocals on Cage the Elephant album Melophobia (2013)
- "Trying to Believe You're Mine": vocals with the Forest Rangers on Sons of Anarchy Season 7 soundtrack.
- "'Til the End Of the Night" and "Wild Love": vocals on James Williamson solo album Re-Licked (2014)
- "England's In My Bones": vocals on Gang of Four album What Happens Next (2015)
- "The Sky Is a Neighborhood", and "La Dee Da": vocals on Foo Fighters album Concrete and Gold (2017)
- "He Is": vocals on Ghost single "He Is" (2017)
- "Hey Lover": vocals on Mini Mansions single "Hey Lover" from the album Guy Walks Into a Bar... (2019)
- "El Naufragio (Salvavidas)": vocals on Diamante Eléctrico's single "El Naufragio (Salvavidas)" from the album "Buitres & Co." (2019)
- "John Wayne" vocal duet from the Billy Idol album Dream Into It (2025)
