= No Wow =

Studio album by the Kills
- Released: February 21, 2005
- Recorded: May 20, 2004–June 2, 2004
- Length: 40:01
- Labels: Domino, RCA, Rough Trade
- Producer: The Kills

The Kills chronology
| Keep on Your Mean Side (2003) | No Wow (2005) | Midnight Boom (2008) |

Professional ratings
Aggregate scores
| Source | Rating |
|---|---|
| Metacritic | 78/100 |
Review scores
| Source | Rating |
| AllMusic | 4.5/5 stars |
| Alternative Press | 4/5 |
| Entertainment Weekly | B |
| The Guardian | 3/5 stars |
| Los Angeles Times | 4/4 stars |
| Mojo | 4/5 stars |
| Pitchfork | 8.3/10 |
| Q | 3/5 stars |
| Rolling Stone | 3/5 stars |
| Spin | B |

No Wow is the second studio album by indie rock band the Kills. It was released on February 21, 2005 in Europe and on March 8, 2005 in United States. "Love Is a Deserter" was released as a single and obtained limited play on several music channels. "The Good Ones" was later released as a single and peaked at number 23 in the UK charts.

The song "No Wow" was used in the TV series Person of Interest, season 5, episode 1; "B.S.O.D." which aired on May 5, 2016. It was also used in the series The Good Wife, season 4, episode 20; "Rape: A Modern Perspective" which aired on April 14, 2013.

== Track listing ==
| No. | Title | Length |
|---|---|---|
| 1. | "No Wow/Telephone Radio Germany" | 4:47 |
| 2. | "Love Is a Deserter" | 3:48 |
| 3. | "Dead Road 7" | 3:23 |
| 4. | "The Good Ones" | 3:29 |
| 5. | "I Hate the Way You Love" | 3:37 |
| 6. | "I Hate the Way You Love, Pt. 2" | 1:46 |
| 7. | "At the Back of the Shell" | 2:27 |
| 8. | "Sweet Cloud" | 5:06 |
| 9. | "Rodeo Town" | 4:24 |
| 10. | "Murdermile" | 4:25 |
| 11. | "Ticket Man" | 2:49 |

=== European Bonus Disc ===
| No. | Title | Length |
|---|---|---|
| 1. | "The Good Ones (The Jagz Kooner Remix)" | 8:25 |
| 2. | "The Good Ones (Tiga Remix)" | 7:12 |
| 3. | "The Good Ones (Backstage Sluts Double Drop Mix)" | 6:03 |
| 4. | "Love Is a Deserter (Cavemen Remix)" | 2:52 |
| 5. | "Love Is a Deserter (Simian Mobile Disco Mix)" | 5:39 |
| 6. | "Love Is a Deserter (Phones 'Cardiac Unrest' Remix)" | 4:35 |
| 7. | "No Wow (MSTRKRFT Remix)" | 4:23 |
| 8. | "No Wow (Chicken Lips Remix)" | 5:43 |
| 9. | "No Wow (Test Icicles Remix)" | 3:10 |
| 10. | "Run Home Slow" | 4:11 |
| 11. | "Baby's Eyes" | 4:08 |
| 12. | "Passion Is Accurate" | 3:31 |
| 13. | "Magazine" | 2:03 |
| 14. | "The Void" | 2:56 |
| 15. | "Half of Us" | 3:56 |

=== Love Is a Deserter single ===
1. "Love Is a Deserter" [Single Version]
2. "Passion Is Accurate"*
3. "Love Is a Deserter" [Cavemen Remix]
4. "Love Is a Deserter" [Phones 'Cardiac Unrest' Remix]
5. "Love Is a Deserter" [Video]

=== The Good Ones single ===
1. "The Good Ones" [Single Version]
2. "Run Home Slow"*
3. "The Good Ones" [Jagz Kooner Mix]
4. "Baby's Eyes"*

* Previously unreleased B-sides.

== Charts ==
Chart performance
| Chart (2005) | Peak position |
|---|---|
| Belgian Albums (Ultratop Flanders) | 28 |
| Belgian Alternative Albums (Ultratop Flanders) | 19 |
| Belgian Albums (Ultratop Wallonia) | 27 |
| Dutch Albums (Album Top 100) | 96 |
| Dutch Alternative Albums (Alternative Top 30) | 8 |
| French Albums (SNEP) | 22 |
| Irish Albums (IRMA) | 60 |
| Italian Albums (FIMI) | 92 |
| Scottish Albums (Official Charts) | 49 |
| UK Albums (Official Charts) | 56 |
| UK Independent Albums (Official Charts) | 4 |
| US Heatseekers Albums (Billboard) | 18 |

== Release history ==
Release dates and formats for No Wow
| Region | Date | Label | Format(s) |
|---|---|---|---|
| United Kingdom | February 21, 2005 | Domino | CD, digital download |
| United States | March 8, 2005 | RCA, Rough Trade | CD, digital download |
