= Jamie Hince =

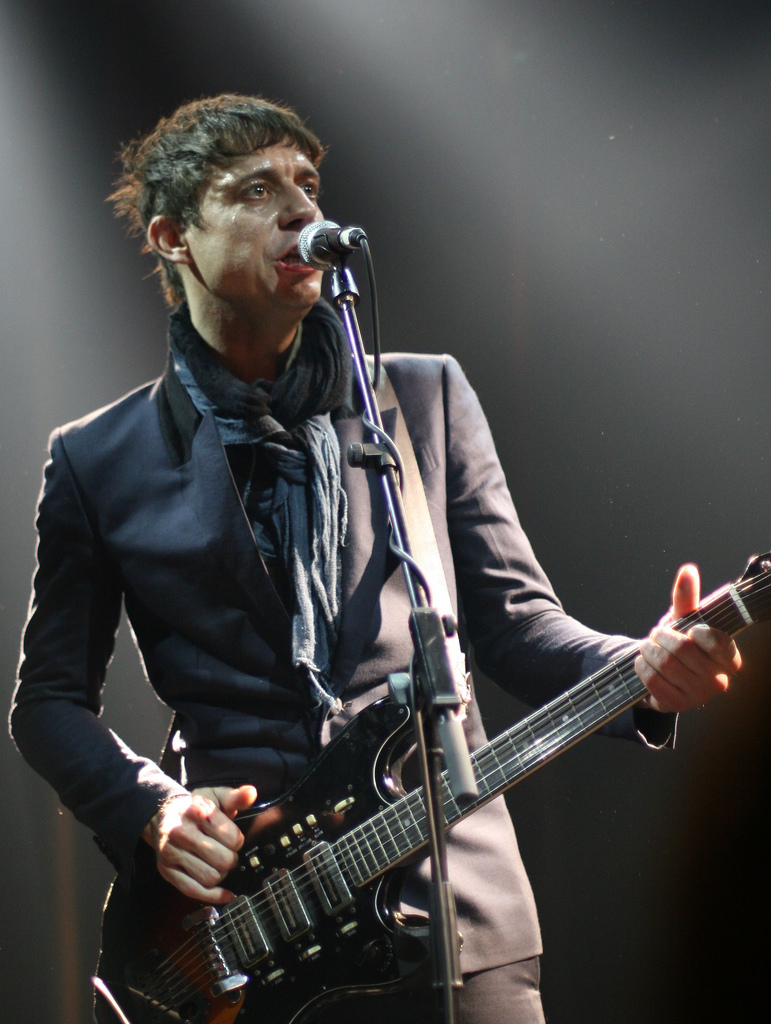
- Hince performing in 2008

Background information
- Also known as: Hotel
- Born: James William Hince; 19 December 1968 (age 56); Buckinghamshire, England
- Genres: Post-punk; garage rock; indie rock
- Occupation(s): Musician, singer, songwriter
- Instruments: Guitar; vocals

James William Hince (born 19 December 1968) is an English guitarist, singer and songwriter, best known as the guitarist for the indie rock duo The Kills. He started his musical career in the bands Fiji, Scarfo, and Blyth Power. He co-founded The Kills with American singer Alison Mosshart in 2000. In The Kills, Hince is known as "Hotel".

In the early 2010s, Hince lost the use of one finger on his left hand following an accident of his hand being shut in a car door. He had to relearn how to play the guitar without it. In 2018, he was featured on Azealia Banks' song "Lorelei" from her second studio album, Fantasea II: The Second Wave.

== Personal life ==
Hince grew up in Woolton Hill, Hampshire, England together with an older sister, Sarah. His parents are Carole and William Hince, the latter having been a pipeline construction manager. He attended Goldsmiths where he studied playwriting.

Hince was married to model Kate Moss. They married in 2011 at St Peter's Church, Southrop in Gloucestershire, and separated in July 2015. They divorced in 2016.

== Discography ==
=== With Blyth Power ===
- The Barman and Other Stories (1988)
- Up From the Country (1988)
- Goodbye to All That (1988)
- Alnwick and Tyne (1990)
- Better to Bat (1990)

=== With Scarfo ===
- Scarfo (November 1995)
- Luxury Plane Crash (July 1997)

=== With Fiji ===
- "Cattlecount" (CD single) (August 1999)
- Glue Hotel Tapes (mini album) (1999)
- "Pillshop" (7" single)

=== Studio albums with The Kills ===
- Keep on Your Mean Side (2003)
- No Wow (2005)
- Midnight Boom (2008)
- Blood Pressures (2011)
- Ash & Ice (2016)
- God Games (2023)
