= The Kills =

English-American rock duo

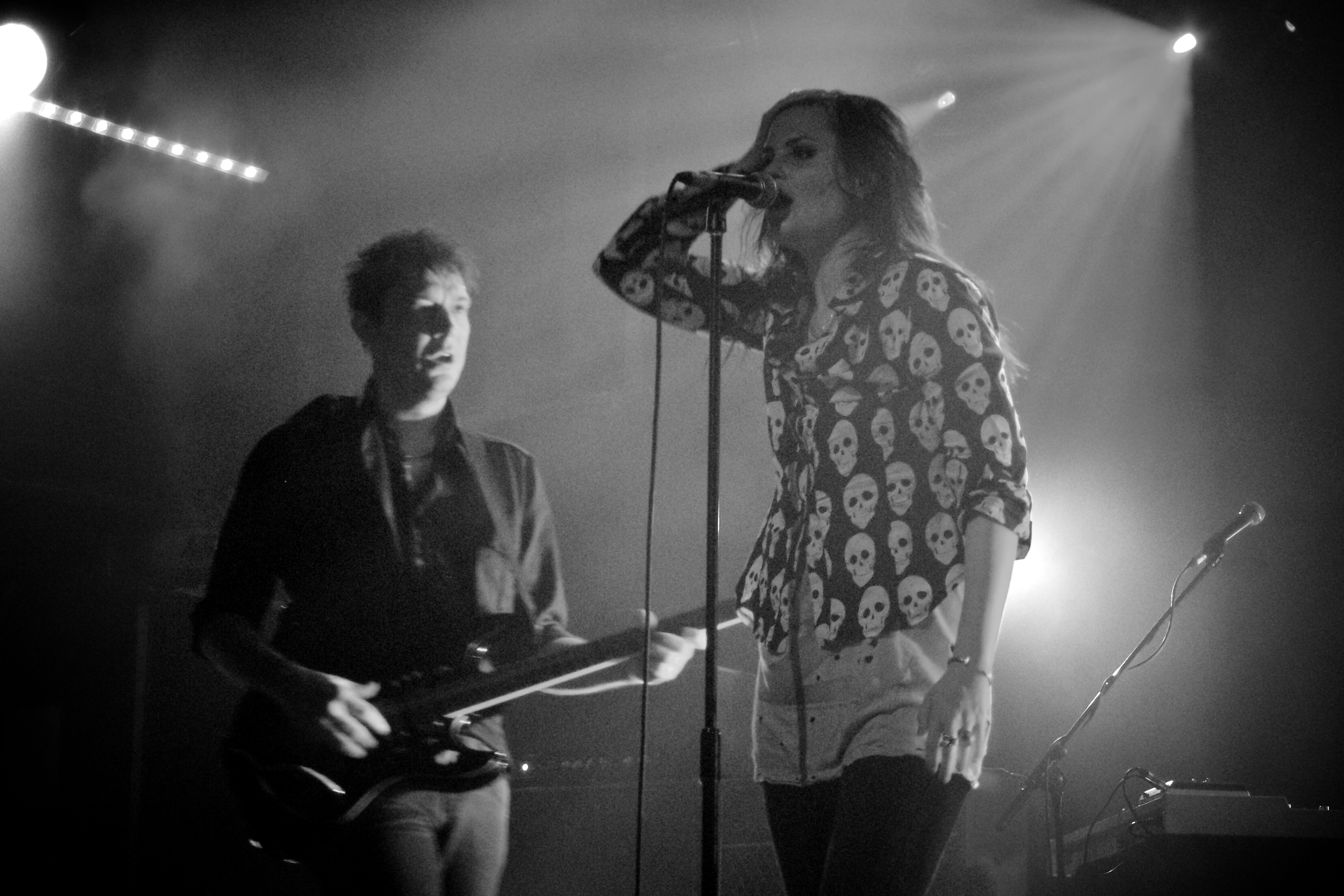
- The Kills performing in March 2011

Background information
- Also known as: VV and Hotel
- Genres: Indie rock; garage rock; blues rock; lo-fi
- Years active: 2001–present
- Labels: Domino; Rough Trade; RCA; Dim Mak; Third Man
- Spinoffs: The Dead Weather
- Members: Alison Mosshart; Jamie Hince
- Website: thekills.tv

The Kills are an English-American rock duo formed by American singer Alison "VV" Mosshart and English guitarist Jamie "Hotel" Hince. They are signed to Domino Records. Their first four albums, Keep On Your Mean Side, No Wow, Midnight Boom, and Blood Pressures, all reached the UK Albums Chart. Their fifth studio album, Ash & Ice, was released in 2016 and reached no. 18 on the UK Albums Chart, the highest in their career.

== Career ==
=== Discount ===
Mosshart and Hince both played in other bands before they formed The Kills in 2001. Mosshart was previously the vocalist of punk rock band Discount, while Hince featured in rock bands such as Scarfo and Blyth Power. Mosshart encountered Hince when her band was touring England, where Hince was "staying in the flat upstairs from where [she] was staying" in London. Mosshart insisted on forming a band with Hince and "really persisted, and eventually we started writing and he encouraged me". Hince supplied her with a four-track tape recorder and insisted she write music as well as lyrics while on tour with her band. The two continued to exchange music ideas by sending each other tapes.

Discount disbanded in 2000, and Mosshart moved to London in the same year. Before settling on a name, Mosshart and Hince performed as "VV" and "Hotel" respectively, Hince explaining that they "named each other off the top of our heads as a stupid romantic ode to the pop art scene". The duo opted for The Kills as it "sounded like a band that could exist in any decade".

=== Signing to Domino ===
Using the ideas on the tapes, Mosshart and Hince began to write minimalist songs with the aid of a drum machine. In 2001 they showcased their new songs on a demo tape while shunning approaches from major record labels. Recording as VV and Hotel, they contributed the song "Restaurant Blouse" to the compilation If the Twenty-First Century Did Not Exist, It Would Be Necessary to Invent It. Shortly after that they recorded their debut release, the Black Rooster EP, which saw release on British indie label Domino Records and was picked up for distribution by Dim Mak Records in the United States.

After touring internationally, they went to Toe Rag Studios where The White Stripes had recorded their album Elephant, to record their debut album Keep on Your Mean Side, mostly on 8-track, in just 2 weeks. Distributed in the U.S. and UK by Rough Trade Records, the album was similar in style to the EP, veering from the Velvets-esque stomp of "Wait" to the noisy, dirty garage punk blues of "Fuck the People" and dark psychedelia of "Kissy Kissy". The record was well received by the music press, though the White Stripes comparisons would not go away.

Mosshart chain-smoked while singing, rarely speaking to the audience; at a New York City show following the ban on public smoking, Mosshart went on stage with three bottles of water, lit up a cigarette, and proceeded to smoke constantly from the first song to the last note of the set. In 2004 Mosshart and Hince bought a house together in Dalston, East London. In 2005, "Monkey 23" was used in the film "De battre mon cœur s'est arrêté", where it played over the closing credits. It was also featured in season three of Peaky Blinders. In 2006, "Wait" was used in Children of Men, where it was described in-universe as "a blast from the past all the way back to 2003, that beautiful time when people refused to accept the future is just around the corner".

=== No Wow and Midnight Boom ===
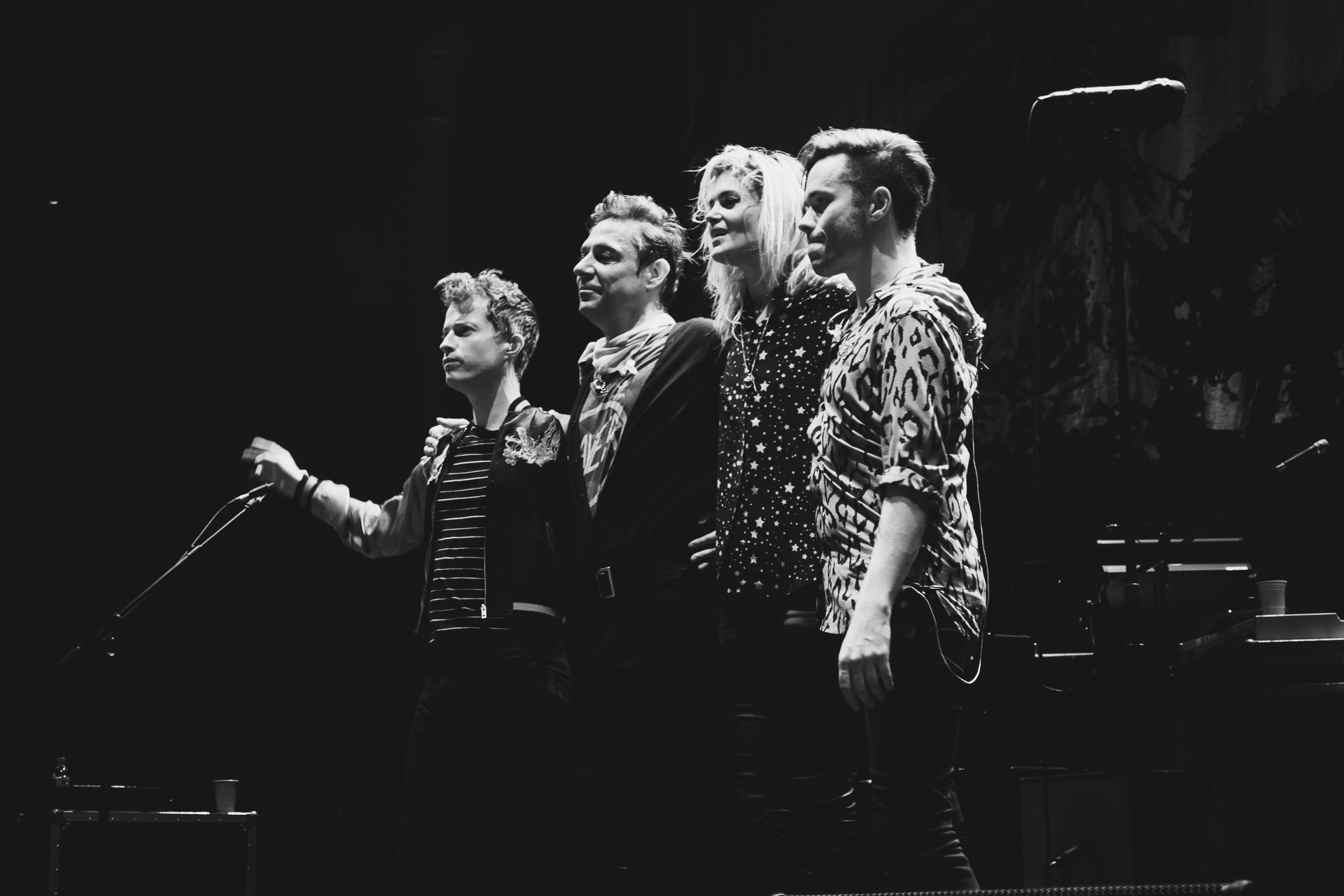
The Kills in October 2016

Their second album, No Wow, was released by RCA Records on March 8, 2005. Featuring an artier, less "guitar rock" sound, the record embraced post punk influences and sounded even more stripped down than Keep on Your Mean Side. Originally written to be performed on a Moog, the band was forced to change directions and record it primarily using a guitar after Hince's Moog broke and couldn't be repaired before entering the studio. A 40-minute DVD documentary was included with a limited number of copies and features interview, performance and on the road footage shot on tour. The first single, "The Good Ones", from No Wow, was released on February 7, 2005, and reached number 23 in the UK Singles Chart, which is their highest-charting single in that chart to date.

Midnight Boom was released in March 18, 2008. Its music was used throughout many American TV shows, including 90210. A big selection of songs from the album were featured in the hit television series Gossip Girl, and also, their track "Sour Cherry" was featured as the soundbed for Season Two's official trailer. "Sour Cherry" was also featured in the Footloose trailer, as well as in the 2008 rom-com The House Bunny. The album also picked up new mainstream success for the band with various TV performances in the UK; appearing on Later... with Jools Holland, Friday Night with Jonathan Ross, T4, The Album Chart Show, Sound, Live From Abbey Road, and From The Basement.

On October 21, 2008, "Cheap and Cheerful" was used on the show House during the opening scene of the episode "Lucky Thirteen". "Cheap and Cheerful" can also be heard on the NHL 09 soundtrack. It was later used in the Fendi's TV commercial for the "Fan di Fendi" perfume (2010). "U.R.A. Fever" was played during a love scene in the 2010 movie The Losers. Only the chorus of the song is played. "U.R.A. Fever" was heard in the 2010 film Welcome to the Rileys, as well as appearing on its soundtrack. It is also heard on the 2011 movie Catch .44 (partially) and the 2012 movie Detention. The bonus song "Night Train" appeared in the 2009 remake of the film Friday the 13th and in the 2012 American drama film What Maisie Knew, along with "Hook and Line". The song "What New York Used to Be" was used in the film Push.

=== Blood Pressures ===
On September 11, 2009, the duo announced on their MySpace page that they had begun work on their fourth studio album though no release date had been set. "Black Balloon" from their "Black Balloon EP", released in 2009, was featured in the Season 2 episode of The Good Wife, "Net Worth", on February 15, 2011. The Kills' fourth studio album, Blood Pressures, was released in April 5, 2011. A video for the first single from Blood Pressures, "Satellite", was released on February 9, 2011, followed By Future Starts Slow, Baby Says, The Last Goodbye, and Wild Charms in September 2012. "Future Starts Slow" was also used in a promotion for the episode "The Wait Is Almost Over" of hit TV series True Blood (season 4). The song from the same album "Damned If She Do" was also used in the promotion of The Vampire Diaries third season, and has received positive reviews from the fans. "The Last Goodbye" was used in the 2012 film Just Like A Woman, starring Sienna Miller.

"Future Starts Slow" appears in the trailer for the 2012 action thriller film Contraband, a March 2012 episode of the Vampire Diaries, in a promotion and, beginning with the second episode, was used as the theme music for the 2012 TV series Political Animals (miniseries), was used towards the end of episode 16, season 2 of Person of Interest and featured in the season 1 finale of Altered Carbon. They contributed a cover of "Dreams" to the Fleetwood Mac tribute compilation "Just Tell Me That You Want Me", set for release on August 14, 2012, through Hear Music and Concord Music Group.

In September the duo published the photo book Dream & Drive, created together with photographer Kenneth Capello. It coincided with an exhibition at the Milk Gallery, London. Paris Spleen: The Kills Live at L'Olympia, the film of their show from November 2011 was released on 20 September 2013 in partnership with the French clothing company Equipment. The Kills were set to go on a small American tour with Queens of the Stone Age in December 2013. In the same year, Hince suffered an injury to his left hand when a car door closed on it. He lost the use of his middle finger and had to have a number of operations. As a result he adjusted his playing style and equipment.

Shortly after the announcement of the shows, the band's record label, Domino Records confirmed that the duo were working on their next album. In May 2014, Mosshart said that they were looking for a new sound and that this new album will be completely different from the others. She noted that "You never know what's going to happen with a record when you're writing. It could be done all of a sudden in two months, or it could take another year. You get on these tangents, and you find new directions. You kind of follow the scent wherever it's taking you. Sometimes it takes a long time. Sometimes it's fast as hell."

=== Ash & Ice, hiatus and God Games ===
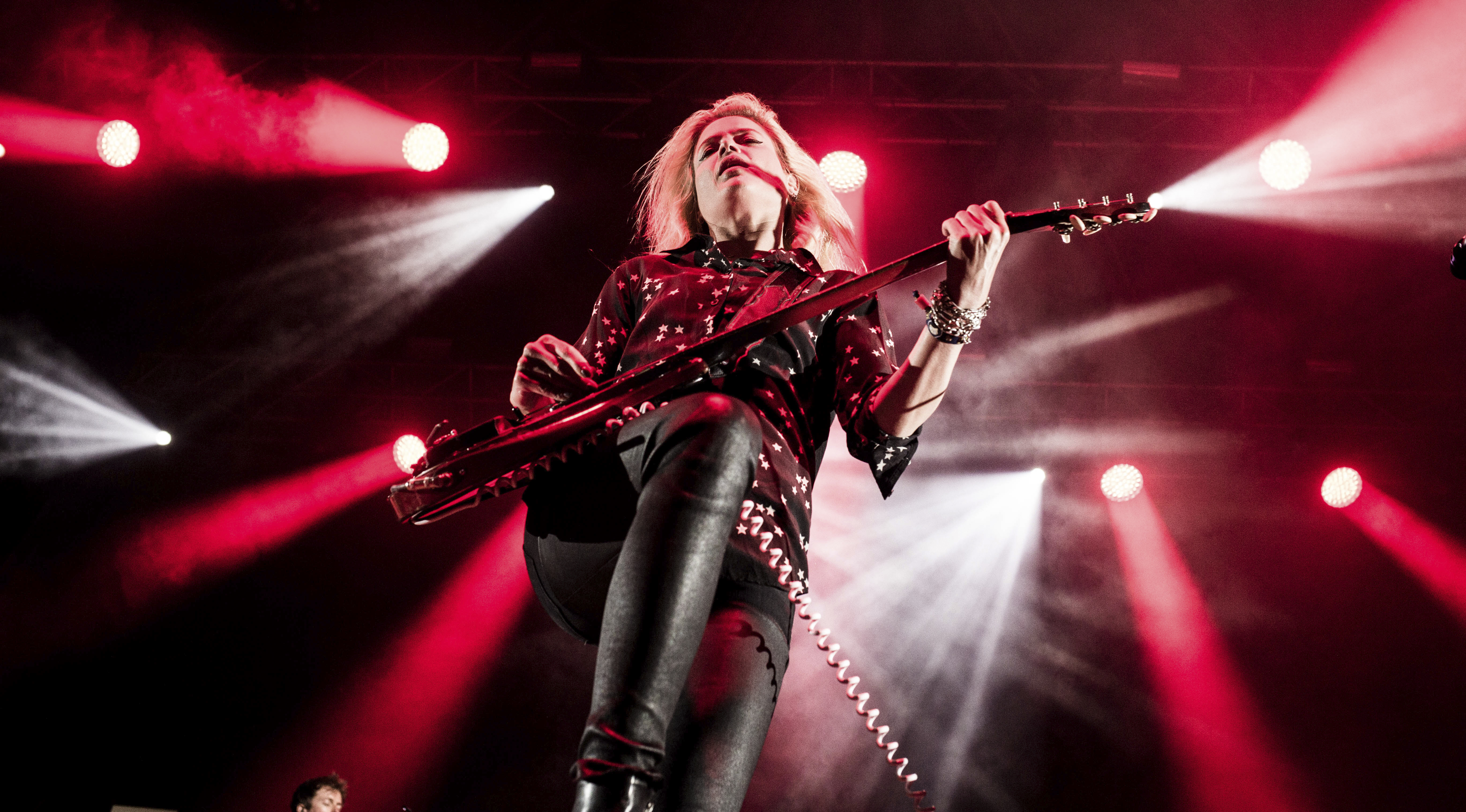
Mosshart at the 2016 Festival Internacional de Benicàssim

The Kills were part of the line-up for Coachella 2016. The Kills fifth studio album, Ash & Ice, was released on 3 June 2016. A new single titled "Doing It to Death" was released in March 2016. The duo embarked on a lengthy world tour, but were forced to cancel European festival dates after Mosshart was diagnosed with pneumonia. In 2017 the group were the support act for Guns N' Roses during the UK leg of their world tour. In 2018, they released a 7-inch single with cover versions of Saul Williams' "List of Demands (Reparations)" and Peter Tosh's "Steppin' Razor", followed by a promotional 7-inch a year later for National Dive Bar Day with the B-sides "Blue Moon" and "Night Train". Mosshart also published her multimedia book Car Ma later that year. The band were largely inactive during 2019, only playing one show that October supporting Social Distortion. At the show, the band played Midnight Boom in its entirety.

In December 2020, the band released the rarities collection Little Bastards, which compiled B-sides and demos from between 2002 and 2009. The band had appeared virtually as a musical guest on The Late Late Show with James Corden the month prior to promote the album, playing "Raise Me" from their home studio. Mosshart also released a handful of solo singles that year: "Rise", "It Ain't Water", and a cover of "State Trooper" by Bruce Springsteen. Sound Wheel, a spoken-word album that served as a companion piece to Car Ma, was released on August 7, 2020 via Third Man Records. Hince, meanwhile, focused on collaborative songwriting; he worked on Deap Vally's Digital Dream EP in February 2021, as well as The Big Pink's single "Love Spins On Its Axis", which he co-wrote with the band and Jamie T.

The band returned in June 2022, playing their first show in almost three years in support of Jack White at the Shoreline Amphitheatre in Mountain View, California. In July 2023, the band released their first new original music in seven years: A double A-side single, "New York" and "LA Hex". Both songs served as the lead singles to band's sixth album God Games, which was released on October 27, 2023. A further two singles were released from the album prior to its release: "103" in August, and "Wasterpiece" in October.

== Personnel ==
- Alison Mosshart – vocals, guitar
- Jamie Hince – vocals, guitar, drums

== Discography ==
- Keep on Your Mean Side (2003)
- No Wow (2005)
- Midnight Boom (2008)
- Blood Pressures (2011)
- Ash & Ice (2016)
- God Games (2023)
